= History of the Encyclopædia Britannica =

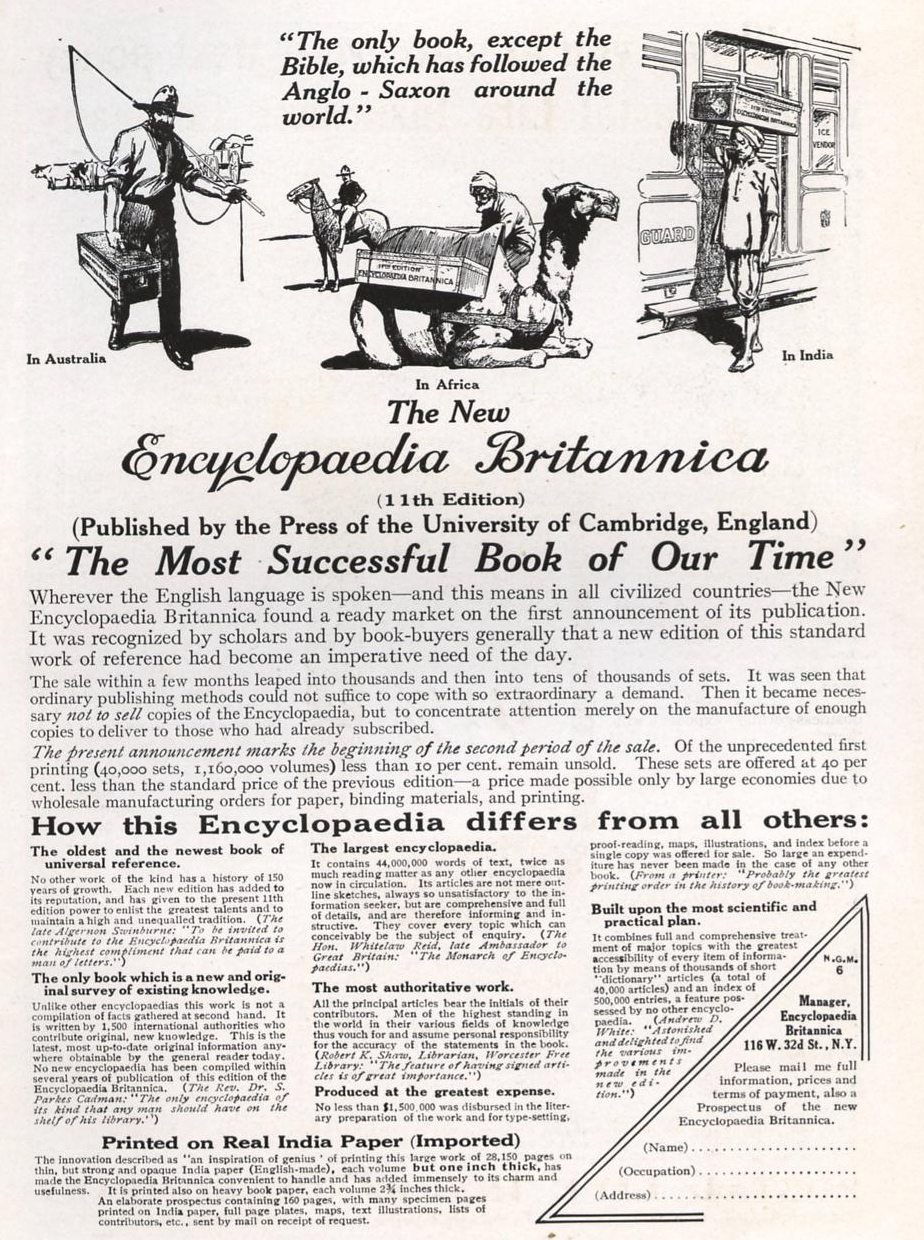
Advertisement for Encyclopædia Britannica, 1913

The Encyclopædia Britannica has been published continuously since 1768, appearing in fifteen official editions. Several editions were amended with multi-volume "supplements" (3rd, 4th/5th/6th), several consisted of previous editions with added supplements (10th, 12th, 13th), and one represented a drastic re-organization (15th). In recent years, digital versions of the Britannica have been developed, both online and on optical media. Since the early 1930s, the Britannica has developed "spin-off" products to leverage its reputation as a reliable reference work and educational tool.

Print editions were ended in 2012, but the Britannica continues as an online encyclopedia on the internet.

== Historical context ==
Encyclopedias of various types had been published since antiquity, beginning with the collected works of Aristotle and the Natural History of Pliny the Elder, the latter having 2,493 articles in 37 books. Encyclopedias were published in Europe and China throughout the Middle Ages, such as the Satyricon of Martianus Minneus Felix Capella (early 5th century), the Speculum majus (Great Mirror) of Vincent of Beauvais (1250), and Encyclopedia septem tomis distincta (A Seven-Part Encyclopedia) by Johann Heinrich Alsted (1630). Most early encyclopedias did not include biographies of living people and were written in Latin, although some encyclopedias were translated into English, such as De proprietatibus rerum (On the properties of things) (1240) by Bartholomeus Anglicus. However, English-composed encyclopedias appeared in the 18th century, beginning with Lexicon technicum, or A Universal English Dictionary of Arts and Sciences by John Harris (two volumes, published 1704 and 1710, respectively), which contained articles by such contributors as Isaac Newton. Ephraim Chambers wrote a very popular two-volume Cyclopedia in 1728, which went through multiple editions and awakened publishers to the enormous profit potential of encyclopedias. Although not all encyclopedias succeeded commercially, their elements sometimes inspired future encyclopedias; for example, the failed two-volume A Universal History of Arts and Sciences of Dennis de Coetlogon (published 1745) grouped its topics into long self-contained treatises, an organization that likely inspired the "new plan" of the Britannica. The first encyclopedia to include biographies of living people was the 64-volume Grosses Universal-Lexicon (published 1732–1759) of Johann Heinrich Zedler, who argued that death alone should not render people notable.

== Earliest editions (first–sixth, 1768–1824) ==
=== First edition, 1771 ===
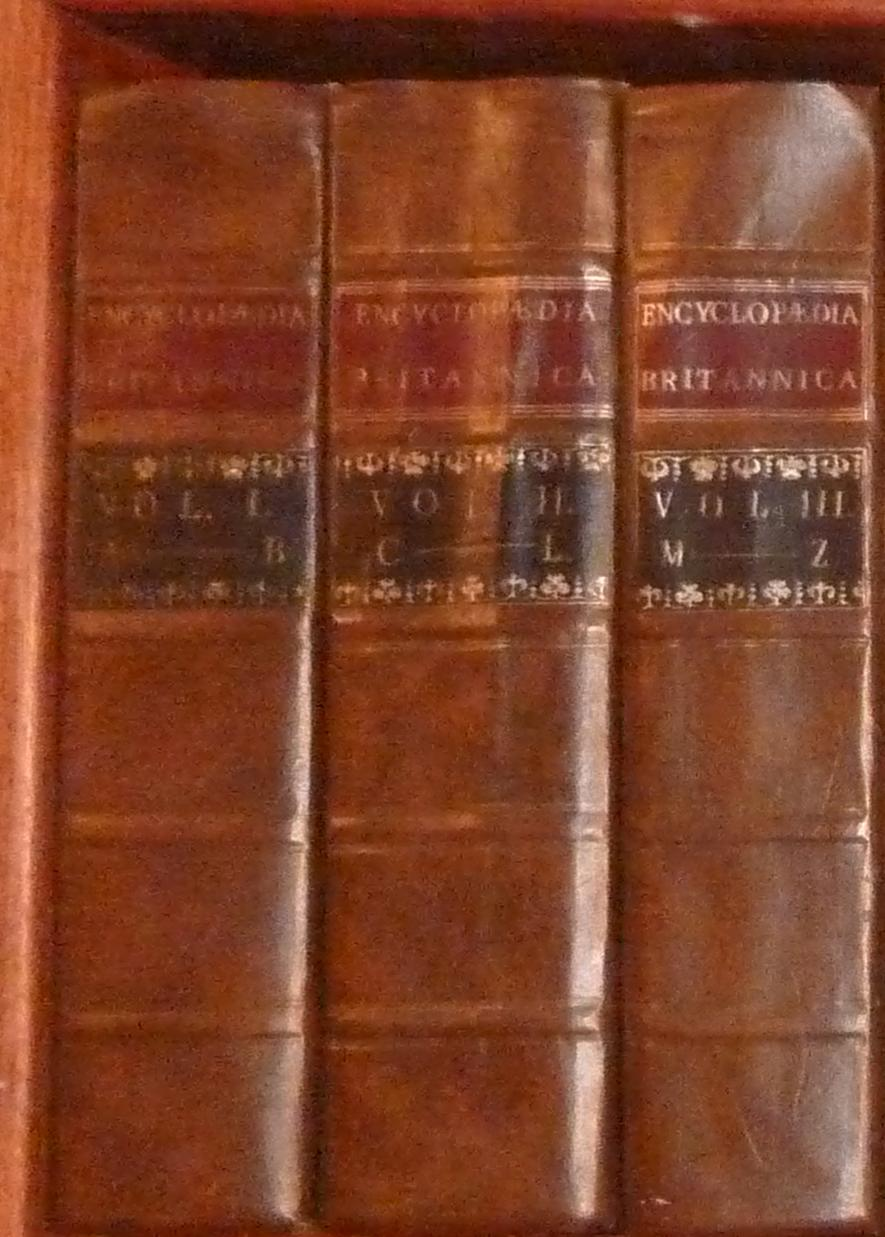
First edition replica

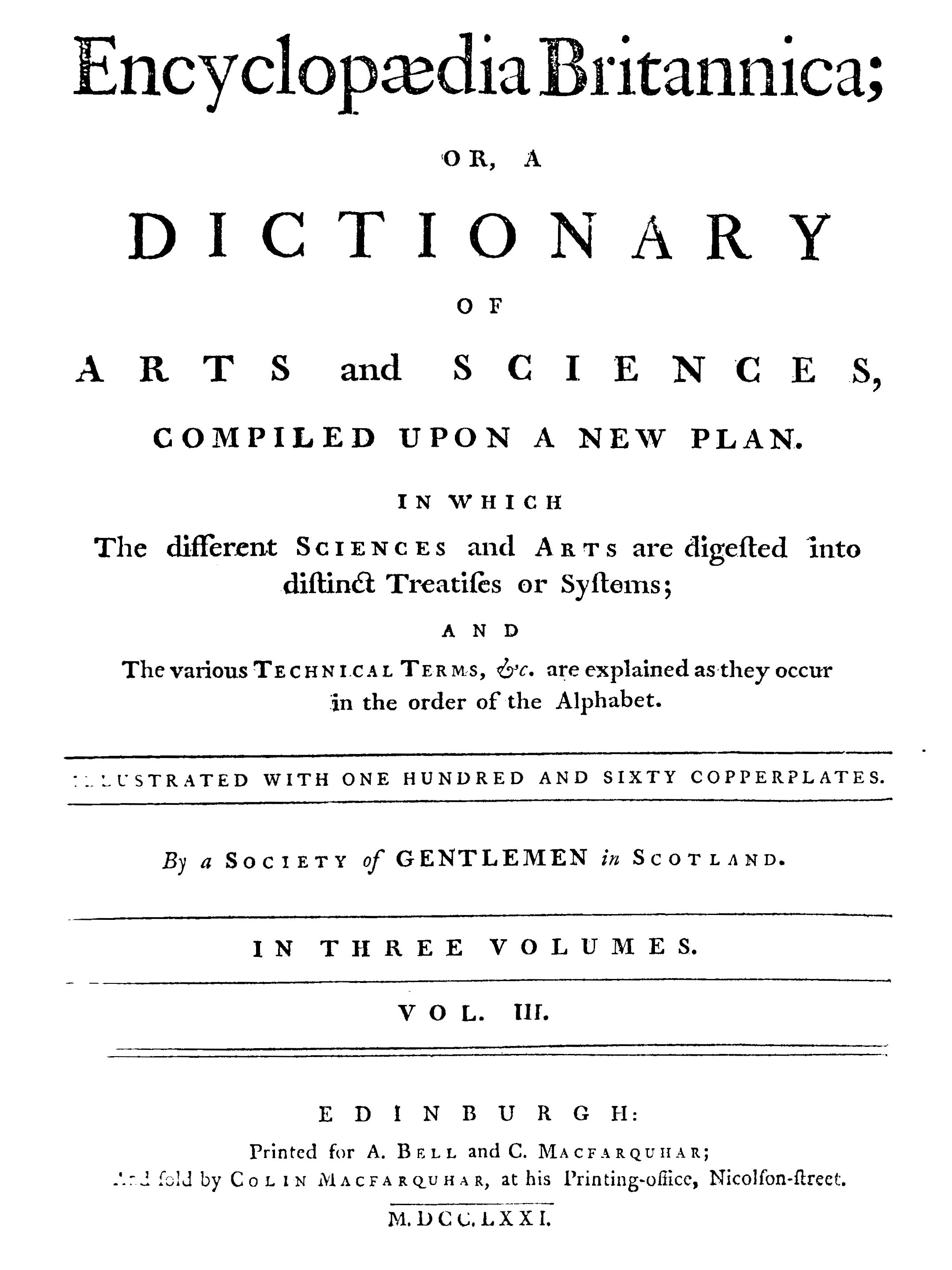
Title page from the first edition

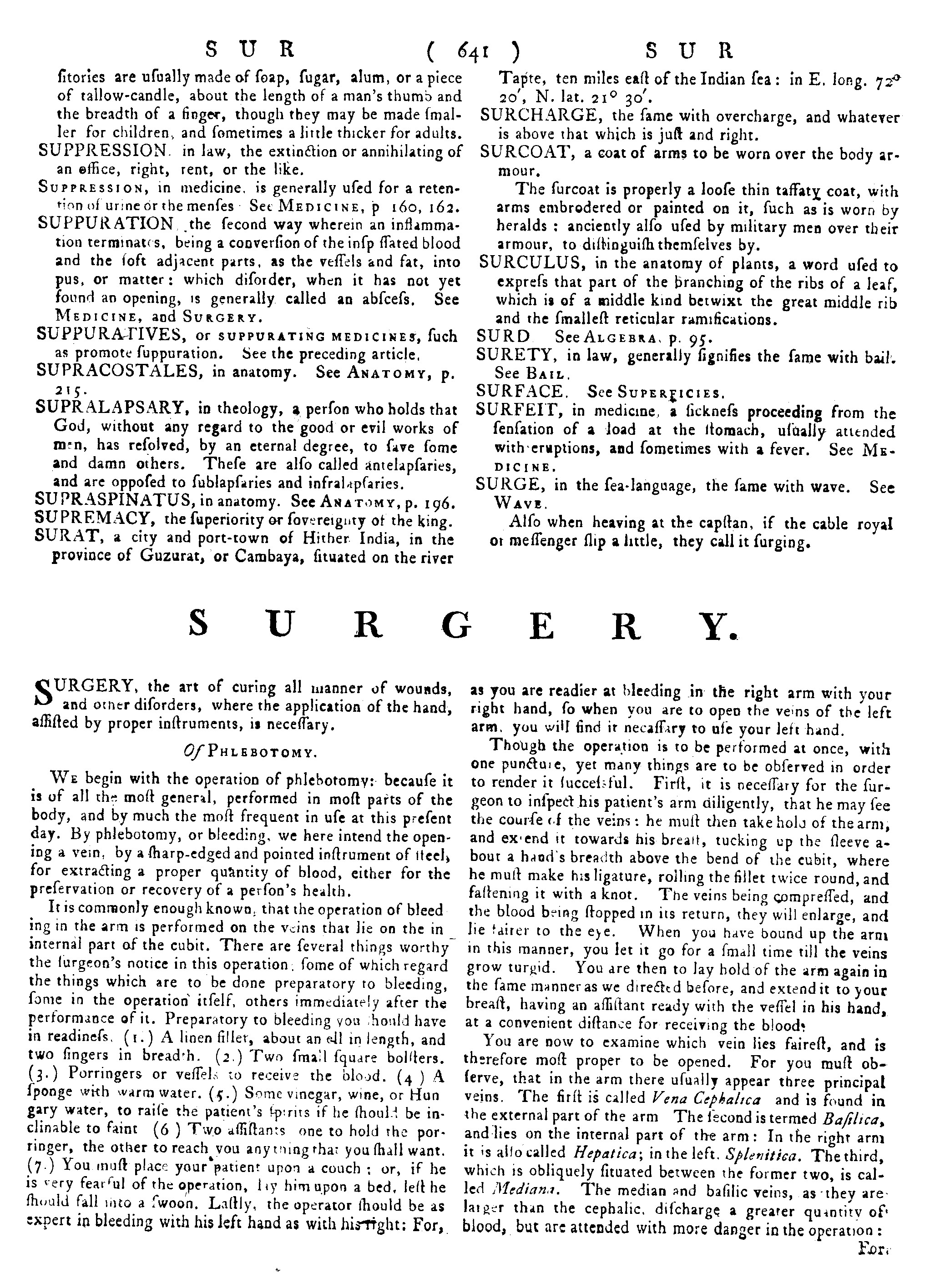
A page from the first edition. The flow of short entries is interrupted here by one of the major treatises.

The Britannica was the idea of Colin Macfarquhar, a bookseller and printer, and Andrew Bell, an engraver, both of Edinburgh. They conceived of the Britannica as a conservative reaction to the French Encyclopédie of Denis Diderot (published 1751–1766), which was widely viewed as heretical. Ironically, the Encyclopédie had begun as a French translation of the popular English encyclopedia, Cyclopaedia published by Ephraim Chambers in 1728. Although later editions of Chambers' Cyclopaedia were still popular, and despite the commercial failure of other English encyclopedias, Macfarquhar and Bell were inspired by the intellectual ferment of the Scottish Enlightenment and thought the time ripe for a new encyclopedia "compiled upon a new plan".

Needing an editor, the two chose a 28-year-old scholar named William Smellie who was offered 200 pounds sterling to produce the encyclopedia in 100 parts (called "numbers" and equivalent to thick pamphlets), which were later bound into three volumes. The first number appeared on 10 December 1768 in Edinburgh, priced sixpence or 8 pence on finer paper. The Britannica was published under the pseudonym "A Society of Gentlemen in Scotland", possibly referring to the many gentlemen who had bought subscriptions. By releasing the numbers in weekly instalments, the Britannica was completed in 1771, having 2,391 pages. The numbers were bound in three equally sized volumes covering A–B, C–L, and M–Z; an estimated 3,000 sets were eventually sold, priced at 12 pounds sterling apiece. The first edition also featured 160 copperplate illustrations engraved by Bell. Three of the engravings in the section on midwifery, depicting childbirth in clinical detail, were sufficiently shocking to prompt some readers to tear those engravings out of the volume.

The key idea that set the Britannica apart was to group related topics together into longer essays, that were then organized alphabetically. Previous English encyclopedias had generally listed related terms separately in their alphabetical order, rather like a modern technical dictionary, an approach that the Britannica's' management described as "dismembering the sciences". Although anticipated by Dennis de Coetlogon, the idea for this "new plan" is generally ascribed to Colin Macfarquhar, although William Smellie claimed it as his own invention.

Smellie wrote most of the first edition, borrowing liberally from the authors of his era, including Voltaire, Benjamin Franklin, Alexander Pope and Samuel Johnson. He later said:

I wrote most of it, my lad, and snipped out from books enough material for the printer. With pastepot and scissors I composed it!

— William Smellie, at a meeting of the Crochallan Fencibles

The vivid prose and easy navigation of the first edition led to strong demand for a second. Although this edition has been faulted for its imperfect scholarship, Smellie argued that the Britannica should be given the benefit of the doubt:

With regard to errors in general, whether falling under the denomination of mental, typographical or accidental, we are conscious of being able to point out a greater number than any critic whatever. Men who are acquainted with the innumerable difficulties of attending the execution of a work of such an extensive nature will make proper allowances. To these we appeal, and shall rest satisfied with the judgment they pronounce.

— William Smellie, in the Preface to the 1st edition of the Encyclopædia Britannica

Smellie strove to make Britannica as usable as possible, saying that "utility ought to be the principal intention of every publication. Wherever this intention does not plainly appear, neither the books nor their authors have the smallest claim to the approbation of mankind".

The first edition was reprinted in London, with slight variants on the title page and a different preface, by Edward and Charles Dilly in 1773 and by John Donaldson in 1775. On the occasion of the 200th anniversary of the 1st edition, Encyclopædia Britannica Inc. published a facsimile of the 1st edition, even including "age spots" on the paper. This has been periodically reprinted and is still part of Britannica's product line.

=== Second edition, 1783, Supplement 1784 ===
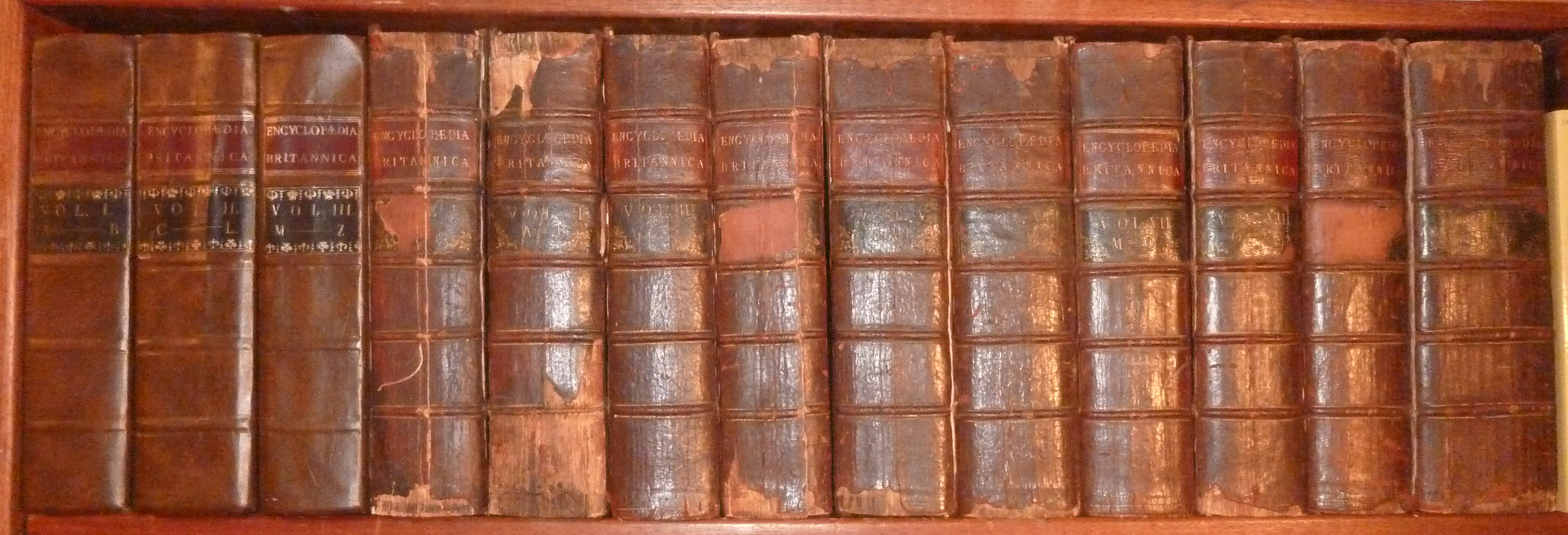
Encyclopædia Britannica First and Second Editions

After the success of the first edition, a more ambitious second edition was begun in 1776, with the addition of history and biography articles. Smellie declined to be editor, principally because he objected to the addition of biography. Macfarquhar took over the role himself, aided by pharmacist James Tytler, M.A., who was known as an able writer and willing to work for a very low wage. Macfarquhar and Bell rescued Tytler from the debtors' sanctuary at Holyrood Palace, and employed him for seven years at 17 shillings per week. Tytler wrote many science and history articles and almost all of the minor articles; by Robert Burns' estimate, Tytler wrote more than three-quarters of the second edition. Compared to the first edition, the second had five times as many long articles (150), including "Scotland" (84 pages), "Optics" (132 pages), and "Medicine" (309 pages), which had their own indices. The second edition was published in 181 numbers from 21 June 1777 to 18 September 1784; these numbers were bound into 10 volumes dated 1778–1783, having 8,595 pages and 340 plates again engraved by Andrew Bell. A pagination error caused page 8000 to follow page 7099. Most of the maps of this edition (eighteen of them) are found in a single 195-page article, "Geography".

The second edition improved greatly upon the first, but is still notable for the large amount of now-archaic information it contained. For example, "Chemistry" goes into great detail on an obsolete system of what would now be called alchemy, in which earth, air, water and fire are named elements containing various amounts of phlogiston. Tytler also describes the architecture of Noah's Ark in detail (illustrated with a copperplate engraving). The second edition also reports a cure for tuberculosis:

He chose a spot of ground on which no plants had been sown, and there he made a hole large and deep enough to admit the patient up to the chin. The interstices of the pit were then carefully filled up with the fresh mould, so that the earth might everywhere come in contact with the patient's body. In this situation the patient suffered to remain till he began to shiver or felt himself uneasy...The patient was then taken out, and, after being wrapped in a linen cloth, was placed upon a mattress, and two hours afterwards his whole body was rubbed with the ointment composed of the leaves of the solanum nigrum and hog's lard.

— James Tytler, in the 2nd edition of the Encyclopædia Britannica

and a somewhat melancholy article on "Love" that persisted in the Britannica for nearly a century (until its ninth edition):

As the force of love prevails, sighs grow deeper; a tremor affects the heart and pulse; the countenance is alternately pale and red; the voice is suppressed in the sauces; the eyes grow dim; cold sweats break out; sleep absents itself, at least until the morning; the secretions become disturbed; and a loss of appetite, a hectic fever, melancholy, or perhaps madness, if not death, constitutes the sad catastrophe.

— James Tytler, in the 2nd–8th editions of the Encyclopædia Britannica

Like the first edition, the second was sold in sections by subscription at the printing shop of Colin MacFarquhar. When finished in 1784, complete sets were sold at Charles Elliot's bookshop in Edinburgh for 10 pounds, unbound. More than 1,500 copies of the second edition were sold this way by Elliot in less than one year, making the second edition enough of a financial success that a more ambitious third edition was begun a few years later.

The long period of time during which this edition was written makes the later volumes more updated than the earlier ones. Volume 10, published in 1783 after the Revolutionary War was over, gives in the entry for Virginia: "Virginia, late one of the British colonies, now one of the United States of North America..." but the entry in Volume 2 for Boston, published in 1778, states: "Boston, the capital of New England in North America, ....The following is a description of this capital before the commencement of the present American war."

The causes of the Revolution are outlined concisely by Tytler in the article "Colonies" thus:

Because several of the colonies had claimed the soul and exclusive right of imposing taxes upon themselves, the statute 6 Geo. III. c. 12 (Note: American Colonies Act 1766 (6 Geo. 3. c. 12)) expressly declares, that all his Majesty's colonies in America, have been, are, and of right ought to be, subordinate to and dependent upon the imperial crown and parliament of Great Britain; who have full power and authority to make laws and statutes of sufficient validity to bind the colonies and people of America, subjects to the crown of Great Britain in all cases whatsoever. And the attempting to enforce this by other acts of Parliament, penalties, and at last by military power, gave rise, as is well known, to the present revolt of our colonies.

A 204-page appendix, written in 1784, is found at the end of Vol. 10. It does not have its own title page, but merely follows with pagination continuing from 8996 to 9200. The appendix introduces articles on Entomology, Ichthyology, Weather, Hindus (spelled Gentoos), and others, and contains many new biographies, including one of Captain James Cook. It curiously contains 25 new pages on Air, which give very little new information about air itself, but mainly cover hot air ballooning, one of Tytler's hobbies. The first page of the supplement begins with the words "Appendix containing articles omitted and others further explained or improved, together with corrections of errors and of wrong references." The appendix also includes 10 plates, namely CCCXIV to CCCXXIII.

=== Third edition, 1797 ===
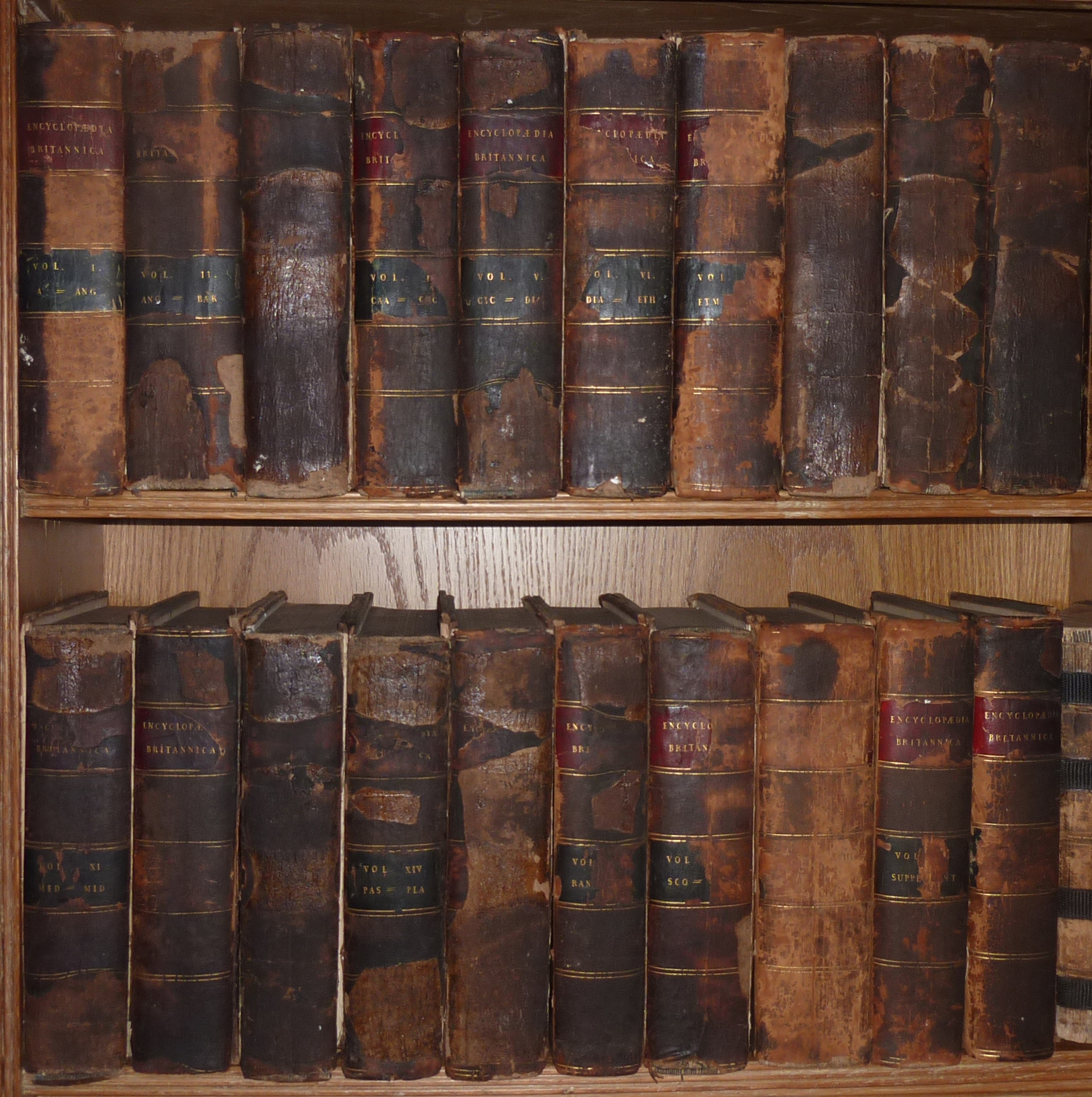
Third edition dated 1797

The third edition was published from 1788 to 1797 in 300 weekly numbers (1 shilling apiece); these numbers were collected and sold unbound in 30 parts (10 shilling, sixpence each), and finally in 1797 they were bound in 18 volumes with 14,579 pages and 542 plates, and given title pages dated 1797 for all volumes. Macfarquhar again edited this edition up to "Mysteries" but died in 1793 (aged 48) of "mental exhaustion"; his work was taken over by George Gleig, later Bishop Gleig of Brechin (consecrated 30 October 1808). James Tytler again contributed heavily to the authorship, up to the letter M. Andrew Bell, Macfarquhar's partner, bought the rights to the Britannica from Macfarquhar's heirs.

Nearly doubling the scope of the second edition, Macfarquhar's encyclopedic vision was finally realized. Recruited by Gleig, several illustrious authorities contributed to this edition, such as Thomas Thomson, who introduced modern chemical nomenclature in a chart appended to the Chemistry article, and would go on to re-write that article in the 1801 supplement (see below), and John Robison, Secretary of the Royal Society of Edinburgh, who wrote several well-regarded articles on sciences then called natural philosophy. The third edition established the foundation of the Britannica as an important and definitive reference work for much of the next century. This edition was also enormously profitable, yielding 42,000 pounds sterling profit on the sale of roughly 10,000 copies. The third edition began the tradition (continued to this day) of dedicating the Britannica to the reigning British monarch, then King George III. In the Supplement to the Third Edition, Gleig called him "the Father of Your People, and enlightened Patron of Arts, Sciences and Literature", and expressed:

...that, by the Wisdom of Your Councils, and the Vigour of Your Fleets and Armies, Your MAJESTY may be enabled soon to restore Peace to Europe; that You may again have leisure to extend Your Royal Care to the Improvement of Arts, and the Advancement of Knowledge; that You May Reign long over a Free, Happy and a Loyal People...

— George Gleig, in the Dedication of the Supplement to the 3rd edition of the Encyclopædia Britannica

The third edition is also famous for its bold article on "Motion", which erroneously rejects Isaac Newton's theory of gravitation. Instead, Gleig, or more likely, James Tytler, wrote that gravity is caused by the classical element of fire. He seems to have been swayed by William Jones' Essay on the First Principles of Natural Philosophy (1762), which in turn was based on John Hutchinson's MA thesis, Moses' Principia, which was written in 1724 but rejected by Oxford University. Nevertheless, Gleig was sanguine about the errors of the third edition, echoing William Smellie's sentiment in the first edition quoted above:

For perfection seems to be incompatible with the nature of works constructed on such a plan, and embracing such a variety of subjects.

— George Gleig, in the 3rd edition of the Encyclopædia Britannica

The first "American" encyclopedia, Dobson's Encyclopædia, was based almost entirely on the third edition of the Britannica and published at nearly the same time (1788–1798), together with an analogous supplement (1803), by the Scottish-born printer, Thomas Dobson. The first United States copyright law was passed on 30 May 1790—although anticipated by Section 8 of Article I of the United States Constitution (ratified 4 March 1789)—but did not protect foreign publications such as the Britannica. Unauthorized copying of the Britannica in America was also a problem with the ninth edition (1889). Unlicensed copies were also sold in Dublin by James Moore under the title, Moore's Dublin Edition, Encyclopædia Britannica; this was an exact reproduction of the Britannica's 3rd edition. By contrast, Dobson's work had various corrections and amendments for American readers.

=== Supplement to the third edition, 1801, 1803 ===
A two-volume supplement to the third edition was published in 1801, having 1,624 pages and 50 copperplates by D. Lizars. A revised edition was published in 1803. This supplement was published by a wine-merchant, Thomas Bonar, the son-in-law of the Britannica's owner Andrew Bell; unfortunately, the two men quarreled and they never spoke for the last ten years of Bell's life (1799–1809). Bonar was friendly to the article authors, however, and conceived the plan of paying them as well as the article reviewers, and of allowing them to retain copyright for separate publication of their work.

The Britannica explicitly positioned itself as a conservative publication in reaction to the radical French Encyclopédie of Diderot published between 1751 and 1766. In the royal dedication penned on 10 December 1800, Gleig elaborated on the editorial purpose of the Britannica

The French Encyclopédie had been accused, and justly accused, of having disseminated far and wide the seeds of anarchy and atheism. If the Encyclopædia Britannica shall in any degree counteract the tendency of that pestiferous work, even these two volumes will not be wholly unworthy of your Majesty's attention.

— George Gleig, in the Dedication of the Supplement to the 3rd edition of the Encyclopædia Britannica

=== Fourth edition, 1810 ===
The fourth edition was begun in 1800 and completed in 1810, comprising 20 volumes with 16,033 pages and 581 plates engraved by Andrew Bell. As with the third edition, in which title pages were not printed until the set was complete, and all volumes were given title pages dated 1797, title pages for the fourth edition were sent to bookbinders in 1810, dated that year for all volumes. The editor was James Millar, a physician, who was good at scientific topics but criticized for being "slow & dilatory & not well qualified". The mathematical articles of Prof. Wallace were widely praised in the fourth edition. Overall, the fourth edition was a mild expansion of the third, from 18 to 20 volumes, and was updated in its historical, scientific, and biographical articles.

Some of the long articles were entirely re-written for the fourth edition. For example, the 56-page "Botany" of the third edition was replaced in the fourth with a 270-page version by moving all the individual plant articles into one. Conversely, the 53-page "Metallurgy" of the third was removed, and replaced by the note "see Gilding, Parting, Purifying, Refining, Smithery." The article "Chemistry," which was 261 pages long in the third, written by James Tytler, and had been re-written in that edition's supplement as a 191-page treatise by Thomas Thomson, appears in the fourth edition as an entirely new 358-page article, which, according to the preface to the fifth edition, was authored by Millar himself. The new treatise was necessary because the copyright to the supplement to the third, which included Thomson's excellent treatise, was not owned by Britannica. (Thomson would much later author the article for the seventh edition). The article "Electricity", 125 pages in the third edition, was completely re-written for the fourth edition and was 163 pages. By contrast, the 125-page "Metaphysics" of the third was largely unchanged for the fourth, and the 306-page "Medicine" of the third was only superficially edited in the fourth and of roughly equal length. (Medicine had been a similar 302 pages in the second edition). The 79-page "Agriculture" of the third was entirely and excellently re-written, and is 225 pages, for the fourth edition. Sixty pages of new information were added onto the end of "America," which grew to 138 pages, with an index and new maps. "Entomology" was expanded from eight pages and one plate in the third edition to 98 pages and four plates in the fourth, with a three-page index. Human "Physiology" was entirely re-written, and went from 60 pages to 80, with an index. "Physics," on the other hand, is unchanged from the third.

In addition, some long articles appear for the first time in the fourth edition. "Geology" is new, even though the word had been coined in 1735. Accordingly, the third edition's 30-page entry "Earth," as well as its 24-page article "Earthquake," and the geological sections of its article "Natural History", were dropped, as these topics are found in the fourth edition's newly written article, which is 78 pages long and has its own index. For other examples, the fourth edition has a 96-page article "Conchology", which listing does not appear in the third or its supplement, and "Erpetology", 60 pages long in the fourth edition, with a 3-page index, is a new listing as well. After "Science" is a new 24-page article "Amusements In Science", which is a virtual Mr. Wizard for the opening of the 19th century.

The majority of copy in the fourth edition, however, is unchanged from the third. Large blocks of text were carried over, line-by-line, unchanged in their typesetting, with some minor editing here and there. For example, the "Boston" article in the third edition contains the sentence, "The following is a description of this capital before the commencement of the present American war." This line is exactly as it had appeared in the second edition, which was written during the war. (The war had been over for years when the third edition was published). In the fourth edition, the word "present" was replaced with "late", the rest of the article remaining entirely unchanged. The article "America" reprinted the entire 81 pages of the third edition, but appended 52 new pages after it, and an index for the 133-page article.

The copyright of the material in the supplement to the third edition was held by Thomas Bonar, who asked 20,000 pounds sterling for it, which Bell declined. The supplemental material was licensed for the fourth edition for 100 pounds, but this copyright issue remained a problem through the sixth edition and the material was not used. The supplements had to be purchased separately.

=== Fifth edition, 1817 ===
Andrew Bell died in 1809, one year before the fourth edition was finished. In 1815, his heirs began producing the fifth edition but sold it to Archibald Constable, who finished it; Millar was again the editor. Completed in 1817, the fifth edition sold for 36 pounds sterling (2011: £1,800) and consisted of 20 volumes with 16,017 pages and 582 plates. In 1816, Bell's trustees sold the rights to the Britannica for 14,000 pounds to Archibald Constable, an apprentice bookseller, who had been involved in its publication from 1788. To secure the copyrights for the third edition supplement, Constable gave Bonar a one-third stake in the Britannica; after Bonar's death in 1814, Constable bought his rights to the Britannica for 4,500 pounds sterling.

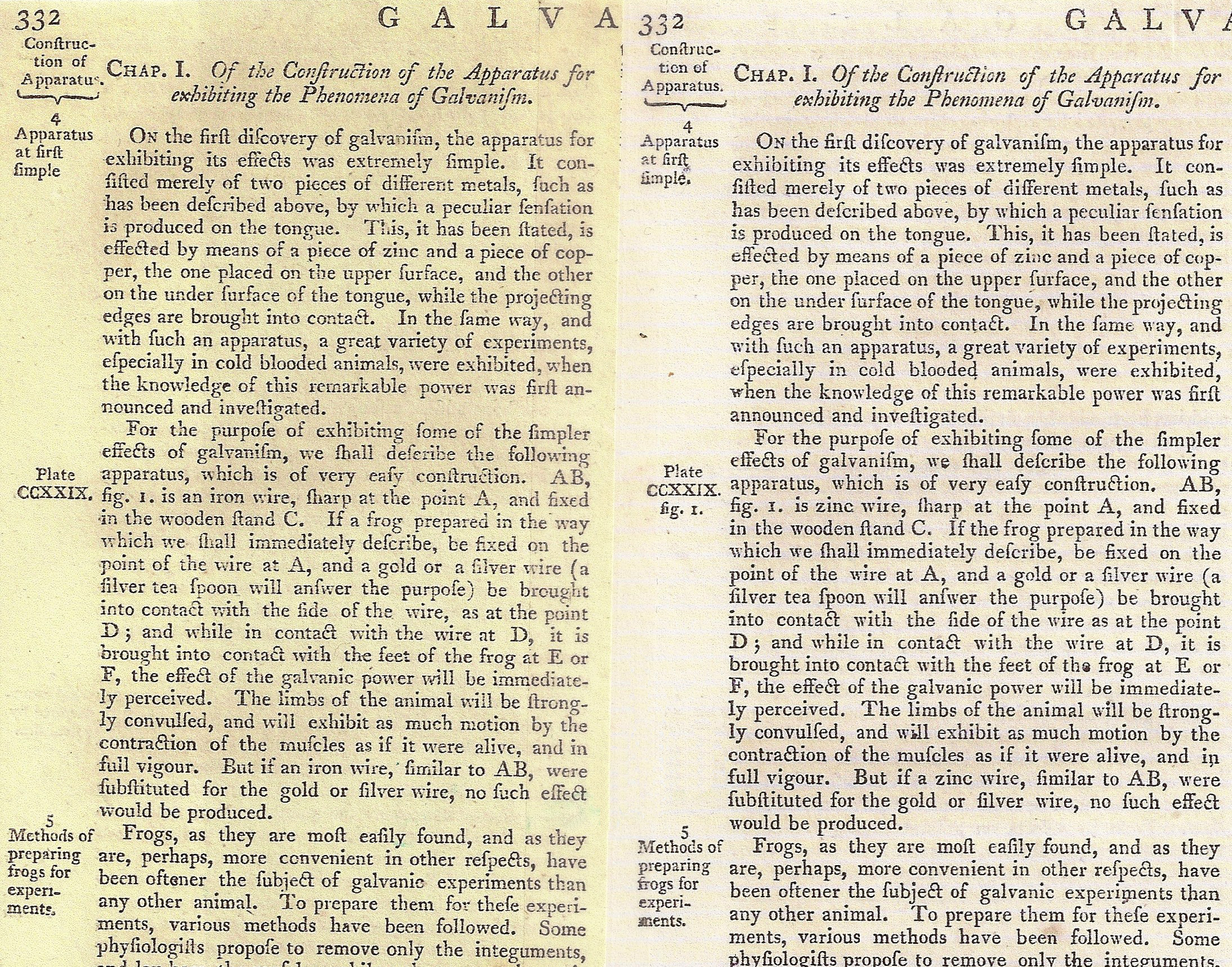
Comparing the 4th edition (left) to the 5th. In lines 4 and 16 of the second paragraph, the word iron was corrected with the word zinc.

The fifth edition was a corrected reprint of the fourth; there is virtually no change in the text. The errata are listed at the end of each volume of the fourth edition, and corrected in the fifth, but the number of errata is small and in some volumes there are none. The plates and plate numbers are all the same, but with the name A. Bell replaced with W. Archibald or other names on all plates, including the maps. Some of the plates have very minor revisions, but they are all basically Bell's work from the fourth or earlier editions, and these new names were probably added for business reasons involving copyright royalties. W. Archibald was probably Constable himself.

Being a reprint of the fourth, set in the same type, Encyclopædia Britannica's fifth edition was one of the last publications in the English language to use the long s in print. The long s started being phased out of English publications shortly after the turn of the 19th century, and by 1817 it was archaic. The Supplement To The Fifth edition (see below), as well as the sixth edition, used a modern font with a short s.

While the sixth volume of the fifth edition was being printed, Constable became owner of Britannica, as well as Bonar's third edition supplements. Legal disputes over the copyright of the third edition supplements continued, however, and for this reason a new supplement was written by Constable's company, which was completed in 1824.

=== Supplement to the fifth edition, 1824 (later known as the supplement to the fourth, fifth and sixth editions) ===
After securing sole-ownership rights in December 1816, Constable began work on a supplement to the fifth edition, even before the fifth edition had been released (1817). The supplement was completed in April 1824, consisting of six volumes with 4,933 pages, 125 plates, 9 maps, 3 "dissertations" and 160 biographies, mainly of people who had died within the preceding 30 years.

This supplement contained a rudimentary form of an index, listing the 669 articles in alphabetical order at the end of volume six, by volume but not page number, but it did not contain any sort of cross referencing. The index was called "Table of the Articles and Treatises Contained in This Work" and was 9 pages long. It was nothing to be compared to a typical encyclopedia index, such as the ones found at the end of the seventh and further editions of Britannica.

This supplement had remarkably illustrious contributors. Constable was friends with Sir Walter Scott, who contributed the articles "Chivalry", "Romance", and "Drama". To edit the supplement, Constable hired Macvey Napier, who recruited other eminent contributors such as Sir Humphry Davy, Jean-Baptiste Biot, James Mill, William Hazlitt, David Ricardo, and Thomas Malthus. Peter Mark Roget, compiler of the famous Roget's Thesaurus and a former secretary of the Royal Society, contributed the entry for physiology. Thomas Young's article on Egypt included the translation of the hieroglyphics on the Rosetta Stone.

The supplement was compiled, for the first five volumes, at a pace which would have given it more than the 6 volumes it eventually would consist of; the alphabet from A-M was put into those five. It was apparently rushed to completion with volume 6, which contained the rest of the alphabet, viz:

- Vol. I: A–ATW, 648 pages.
- Vol. II: AUS–CEY, 680 pages.
- Vol. III: CHE–ECO, 726 pages.
- Vol. IV: EDI–HOR, 708 pages.
- Vol. V: HUN–MOL, 586 pages.
- Vol. VI: NAI–Z, 863 pages.

=== Sixth edition, 1823 ===
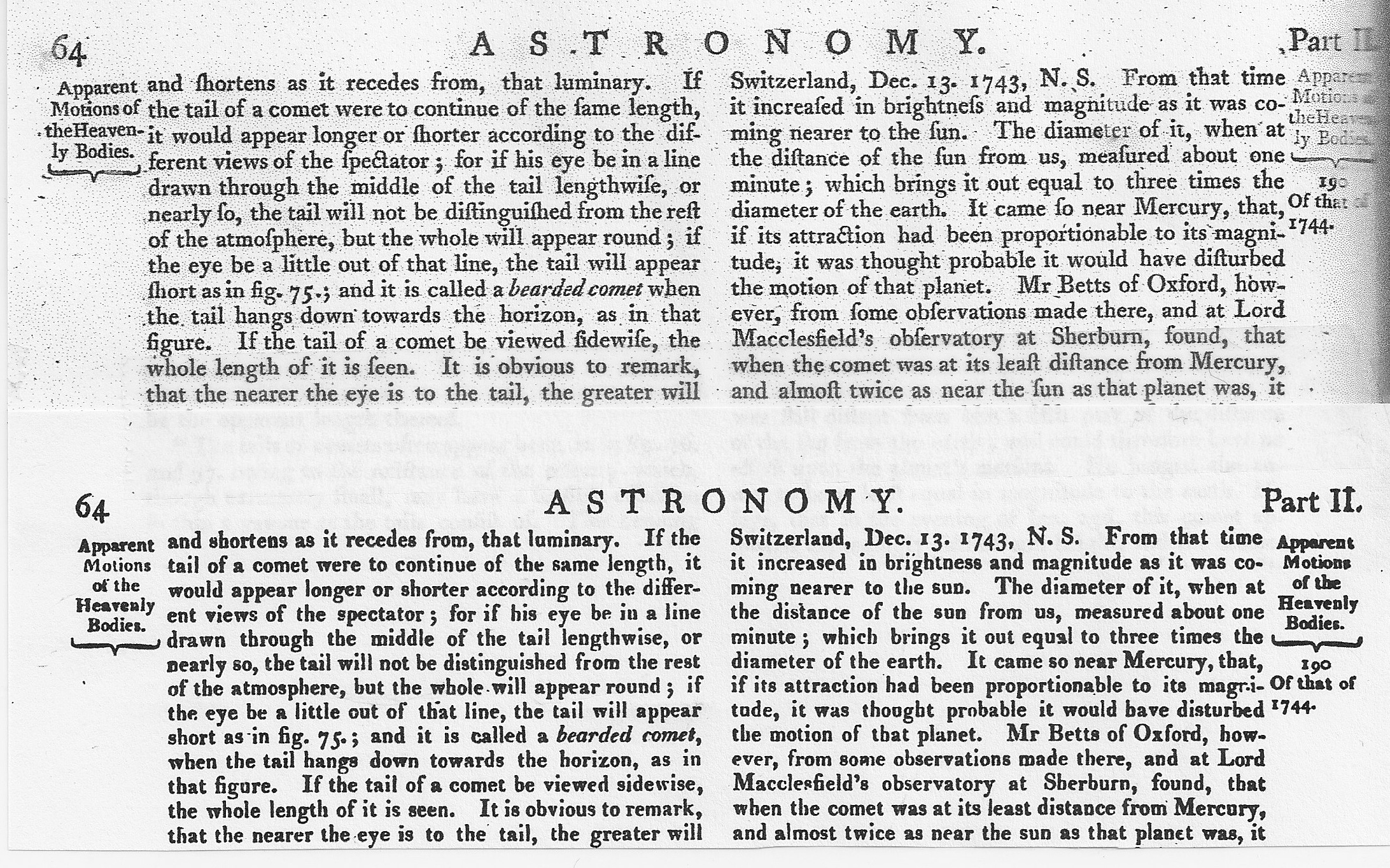
Comparing the 5th edition, top, with the 6th. The only change was the typeface, which included the removal of the long s from the font.

Constable also produced the sixth edition, which was completed in May, 1823. It was published in 40 half-volume parts, priced 16 shillings in boards (32 pounds for the set). The editor was Charles Maclaren. The sixth edition was a reprint of the fifth with a modern typeface. It even used the preface to the fifth edition, dated December 1, 1817, as its own. Only the short page, "Advertisement To The Sixth Edition", which was bound in volume 1 after the forward and dated January, 1822, set it apart. In that advertisement, it is claimed that some geographical articles would be updated, and that the articles in the supplement to the third edition would be inserted into the encyclopedia in their proper alphabetical places. Although the advertisement claimed that these articles would be included in this manner, they were not, and the author of the preface to the seventh edition states that none of this material entered the main body until that edition, and even gives a list of the articles which were.

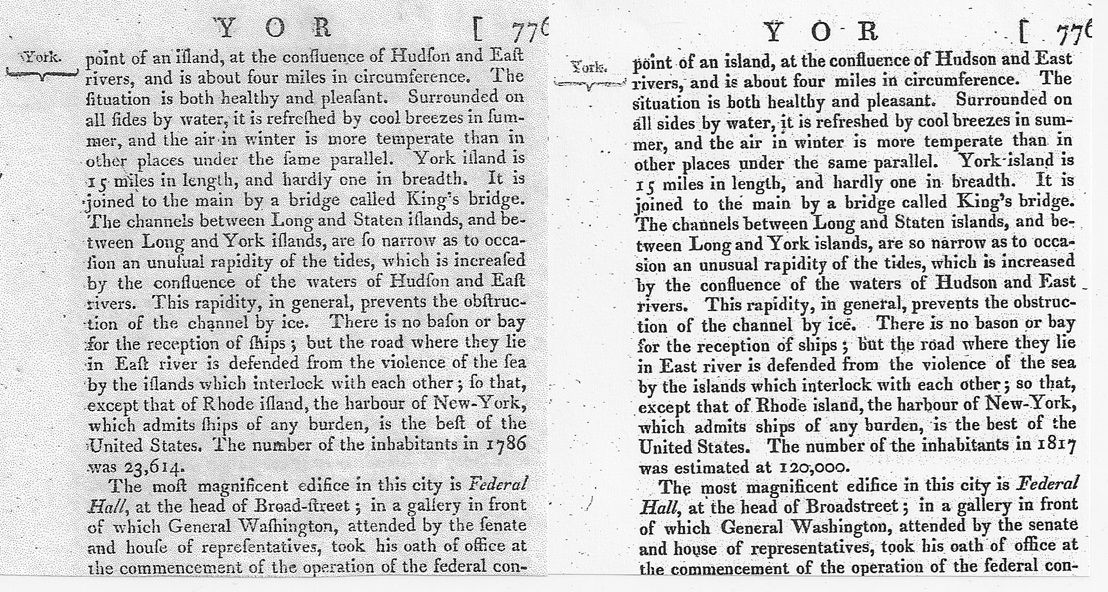
Comparing the 5th edition to the 6th, showing one of the geographical updates. The population of New York City was increasing rapidly, and that figure needed to be revised.

Almost no changes were made to the text, it was basically a remake of the fifth with very minor updates. All in all, the fourth, fifth, and sixth editions are virtually the same as each other. Rather than revising the main text of the encyclopedia with each edition, Constable chose to add all updates to the supplement. It's probable that the sixth edition only exists because of the need to remove the long s, which had gone out of style, from the font, which required the whole encyclopedia to be re-typeset.

The Supplement to the fifth edition was finished in 1824, and was sold with those sets, as well as with sets of the sixth edition, to be delivered at its completion. This supplement curiously was started during the production of the fifth edition but was not finished until after the 6th was completed. It also was sold as a unit for owners of the fourth edition, and became known as "Supplement to the 4th, 5th and 6th edition".

Unfortunately, Constable went bankrupt on 19 January 1826 and the rights to the Britannica were sold on auction; they were eventually bought on 16 July 1828 for 6,150 pounds sterling by a partnership of four men: Adam Black (a publisher), Alexander Wight (a banker), Abram Thomson (a bookbinder) and Thomas Allen, the proprietor of the Caledonian Mercury. Not long after, Black bought out his partners and ownership of the Britannica passed to the Edinburgh publishing firm of A & C Black.

Britannica by the sixth edition was in some regards hopelessly out of date. The supplement to the third edition contained updates which were not included in it, and which had become dated themselves anyway, the fourth edition expanded the text somewhat but revised very little, and the fifth and sixth were just reprints of the fourth. The supplement to the fourth/fifth/sixth edition addressed the issue of updates in a clumsy way, often referring back to the encyclopedia, essentially making the reader look everything up twice. What was needed was a completely new edition from the ground up. This was to be accomplished with the magnificent seventh edition.

== A. and C. Black editions (seventh–ninth, 1827–1901) ==
=== Seventh edition, 1842 ===
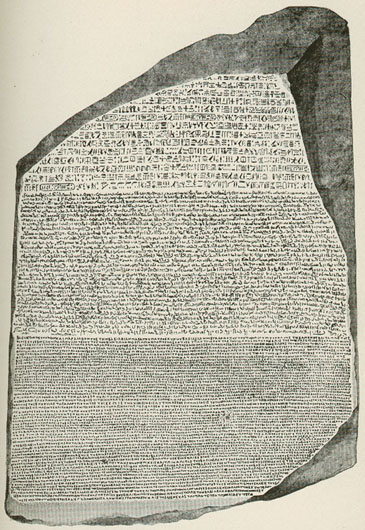
Early 19th-century editions of Encyclopædia Britannica included seminal works such as Thomas Young's article on Egypt, which included the translation of the hieroglyphics on the Rosetta Stone.

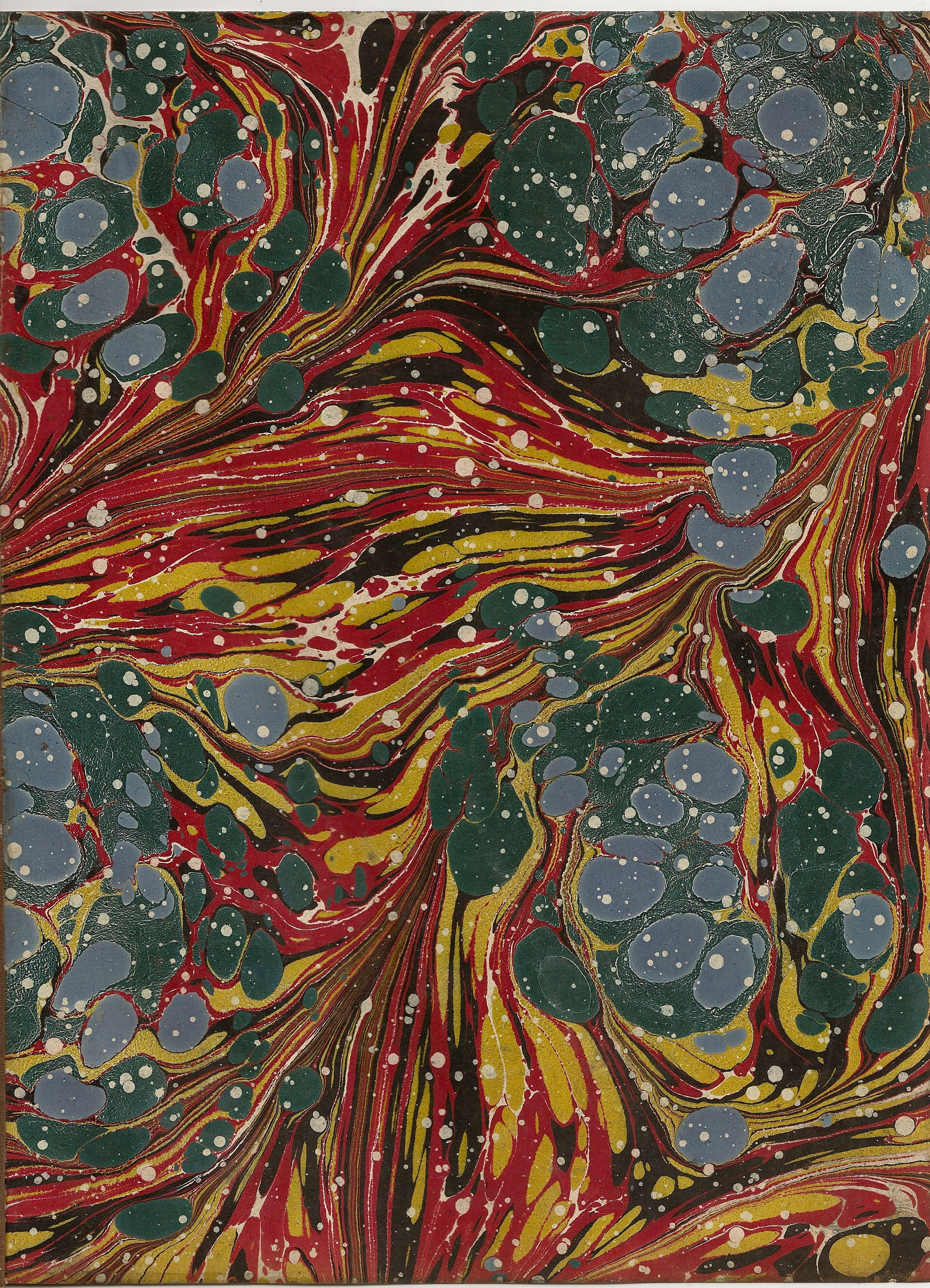
Endpaper from the 7th edition

The seventh edition was begun in 1827 and published from March 1830 to January 1842, although all volumes have title pages dated 1842. It was a new work, not a revision of earlier editions, although some articles from earlier editions and supplements are used. It was sold to subscribers in monthly "parts" of around 133 pages each, at 6 shilling per part, with 6 parts combined into 800 page volumes for 36 shillings. The promise was made in the beginning that there would be 20 volumes, making the total £36 for the set. Volume 1 was only 5 parts, entirely made up of dissertations. Volume 2, in 6 parts, was the beginning of alphabetical listings. The 12th part, another dissertation, was ready in 1831, and would have been the first part of volume 3, but the publishers put it into a separate volume at 12 shillings. In total the subscribers wound up paying for 127 parts (£38, two shillings).

It was edited by Macvey Napier, who was assisted by James Browne, LLD. It consisted of 21 numbered volumes with 17,101 pages and 506 plates. It was the first edition to include a general index for all articles, a practice that was maintained until 1974. The index was 187 pages, and was either bound alone as an unnumbered thin volume, or was bound together with volume I. Many illustrious contributors were recruited to this edition, including Sir David Brewster, Thomas de Quincey, Antonio Panizzi and Robert Stephenson. James Wilson did all of Zoology, Hampden did all of Greek philosophy, and William Hosking contributed the excellent article Architecture. Thomas Thomson, who wrote Chemistry for the third edition supplement 40 years earlier, was recruited to write that article again for the seventh edition. Mathematical diagrams and illustrations were made from woodcuts, and for the first time in Britannica's history, were printed on the same pages as the text, in addition to the copperplates.

The seventh edition, when complete, went on sale for £24 per set. However, Adam Black had invested more than £108,766 in its production: £5,354 for advertising, £8,755 for editing, £13,887 for 167 contributors, £13,159 for plates, £29,279 for paper, and £19,813 for the printing. In the end, roughly 5,000 sets were sold but Black considered himself well-rewarded in intellectual prestige.

Title pages for all volumes were printed in 1842 and delivered with the completed set. An index to the entire set was created that year as well, and was the first of its kind for Britannica. Being only 187 pages long, it did not warrant its own volume, and was sent to bookbinders with instructions to include it at the beginning of volume 1, the dissertations volume, which had been printed in 1829. This same arrangement would also be used for the eighth edition, but not the ninth.

=== Eighth edition, 1860 ===
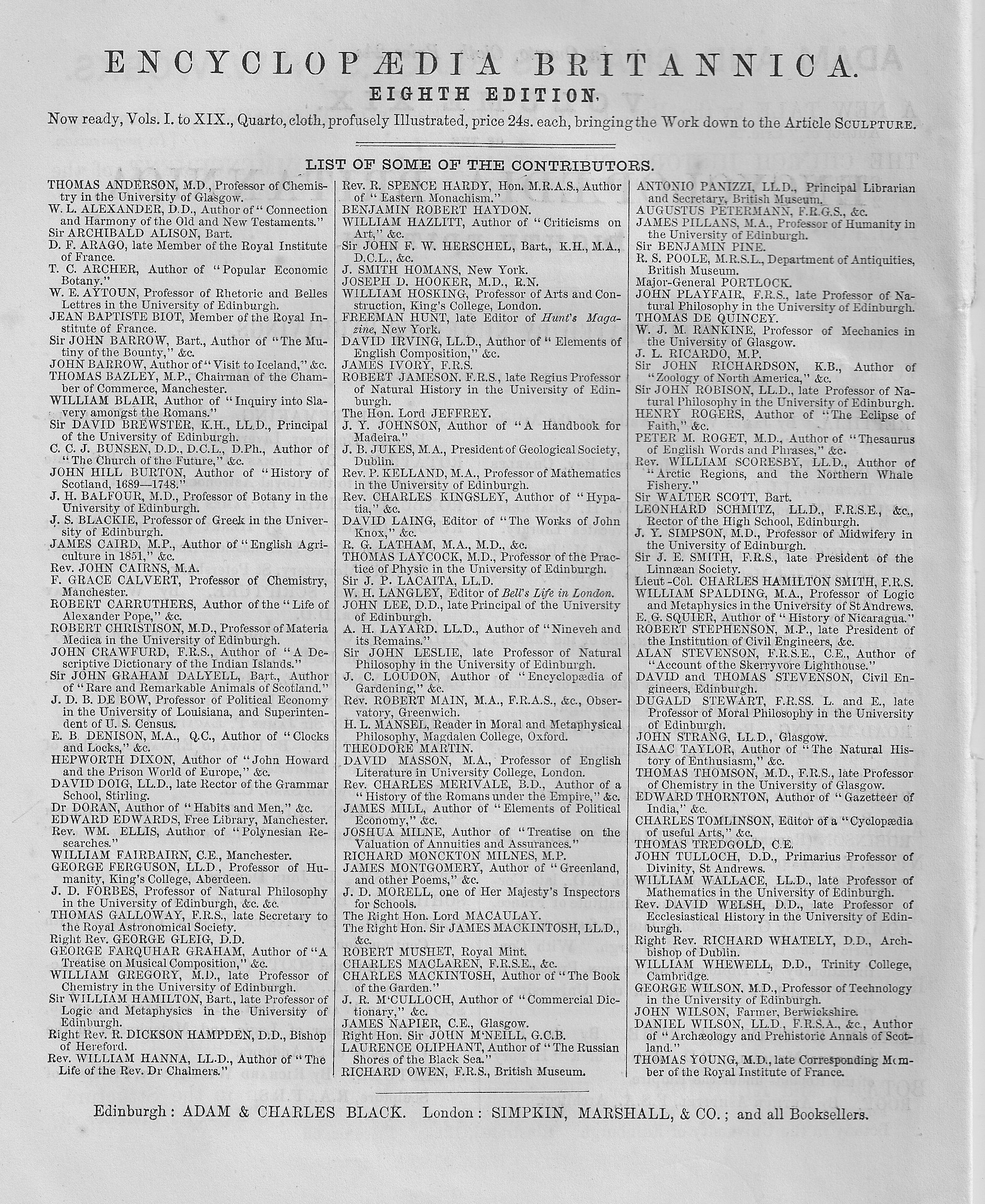
1858 advertisement for then-available volumes 1 through 19 of the 8th edition, cloth-bound at 24 shillings per volume

The eighth edition was published from 1853 to 1860, with title pages for each volume dated the year that volume was printed. It contained 21 numbered volumes, with 17,957 pages and 402 plates. The index, published in 1861, was 239 pages, and was either bound alone as an unnumbered 22nd volume, or was bound together with volume I, the dissertations volume. Four of these dissertations were carried over from the seventh edition, and two were new to the eighth. The five included in volume 1 of the eighth (1853) were authored by Dugald Stewart, James Mackintosh, Richard Whately, John Playfair, and John Leslie, in that order, with the Whately work being a new one. A sixth dissertation, by J. D. Forbes, was issued in 1856, in a separate quarto volume, "gratis, along with Vol. XII".

The alphabetical encyclopedia began at the beginning of volume 2. The price was reduced to 24 shillings per volume, cloth-bound. In addition to the Edinburgh sets, more sets were authorized by Britannica to the London publishers Simpkin, Marshall and Company, and to Little, Brown and Company of Boston.

Since Macvey Napier died in 1847, Adam Black selected for its editor Thomas Stewart Traill, a professor of medical jurisprudence at Edinburgh University. When Traill fell ill, he was assisted by a young Scottish philosopher, John Downes. Black was able to hold costs to roughly £75,655. This edition began the tradition of a contributors' banquet to celebrate the edition's completion (5 June 1861).

The eighth edition is a thorough revision, even more so than the Seventh. Some long articles were carried over from the seventh edition, but most were completely re-written, and new articles by illustrious contributors were added. In all, there were 344 contributors, including Lord Macaulay, Charles Kingsley, Robert Chambers, the Rev. Charles Merivale, Joseph Dalton Hooker, Baron Robert Bunsen, Sir John Herschel, Professors Richard Owen, John Stuart Blackie and William Thomson (Lord Kelvin). Photography is listed for the first time. This edition also featured the first American contributor to the Britannica, Edward Everett, who wrote a 40,000-word hagiographic biography of George Washington

In being a living proof that pure patriotism is not a delusion, or virtue an empty name, no one of the sons of man has equalled George Washington.

— Edward Everett, in the eighth edition of the Encyclopædia Britannica

The consequences of reducing the costs of production of the eighth edition can be seen today in surviving sets. With only 402 plates, this edition has the fewest since the second edition, and far fewer woodcuts within the text pages were used than in the seventh edition. The maps are all reprinted from the seventh edition, even the ones that should have been updated. In the first few volumes, a sheet of onion-skin paper faces each plate, but after volume 6, they were eliminated. To save money, the end pages and covers were not marbled, as this was an expensive process. Finally, the end pages contain advertisements for other products sold by A & C. Black, such as atlases and travel guides, and advertisements encouraging subscribers to continue their enrollments.

=== Ninth edition, 1875–1889 ===
The landmark ninth edition, often called "the Scholar's Edition", was published from January 1875 to 1889 in 25 volumes, with volume 25 the index volume. Unlike the first two Black editions, there were no preliminary dissertations, the alphabetical listing beginning in volume 1. Up to 1880, the editor, and author of the Foreword, was Thomas Spencer Baynes—the first English-born editor after a series of Scots—and W. Robertson Smith afterwards. An intellectual prodigy who mastered advanced scientific and mathematical topics, Smith was a professor of theology at the Free Church College in Aberdeen, and was the first contributor to the Britannica who addressed the historical interpretation of the Bible, a topic then already familiar on the Continent of Europe. Smith contributed several articles to the ninth edition, but lost his teaching position on 24 May 1881, due to the controversy his (ir)religious articles aroused; he was immediately hired to be joint editor-in-chief with Baynes.

The ninth and 11th editions are often lauded as high points for scholarship; the ninth included yet another series of illustrious contributors such as Thomas Henry Huxley (article on "Evolution"), Lord Rayleigh (articles on "Optics, Geometrical" and "Wave Theory of Light"), Algernon Charles Swinburne (article on "John Keats"), William Michael Rossetti, Amelia Edwards (article on "Mummy"), Prince Kropotkin (articles on "Moscow", "Odessa" and "Siberia"), James George Frazer (articles on "Taboo" and "Totemism"), Andrew Lang (article on "Apparitions"), Lord Macaulay, James Clerk Maxwell (articles on "Atom" and "Ether"), Lord Kelvin (articles on "Elasticity" and "Heat") and William Morris (article on "Mural Decoration"). Robert Louis Stevenson, then 25, contributed an article about Robert Burns that, being unenthusiastic, was never printed. There were roughly 1100 contributors altogether, a handful of whom were women; this edition was also the first to include a significant article about women ("Women, Law Relating to"). Evolution was listed for the first time, in the wake of Charles Darwin's writings, but the subject was treated as if still controversial, and a complete working of the subject would have to wait for the 11th edition. The eighth edition has no listing for the subject at all.

Compared to the eighth edition, the ninth was far more luxurious, with thick boards and high-quality leather bindings, premier paper, and a production which took full advantage of the technological advances in printing in the years between the 1850s and 1870s. Great use was made of the new ability to print large graphic illustrations on the same pages as the text, as opposed to limiting illustrations to separate copperplates. Although this technology had first been used in a primitive fashion the seventh edition, and to a much lesser extent in the 8th, in the ninth edition there were thousands of quality illustrations set into the text pages, in addition to the plates. The ninth edition was a critical success, and roughly 8,500 sets were sold in Britain. A & C Black authorized the American firms of Charles Scribner's Sons of New York, Little, Brown and Company of Boston, and Samuel L. Hall of New York, to print, bind and distribute additional sets in the United States, and provided them with stereotype plates for text and graphics, specifications on the color and tanning quality of the leather bindings, etc., so the American-produced sets would be identical to the Edinburgh sets except for the title pages, and that they would be of the same high quality as the Edinburgh sets. Scribner's volumes and Hall volumes were often mixed together in sets by N.Y. distributors and sold this way as they were interchangeable, and such sets are still found this way. A total of 45,000 authorized sets were produced this way for the US market. Scribners' claimed U.S. copyright on several of the individual articles.

In spite of this, several hundred thousand cheaply produced bootlegged copies were also sold in the U.S., which still did not have copyright laws protecting foreign publications. Famous infringers of that era include the Philadelphian Joseph M. Stoddart, who employed a spy in the Britannica's own printshop, Neill and Company, in Edinburgh. The spy would steal the proofreader's copies and send them by fastest mail to the United States, allowing Stoddart to publish his version simultaneously with the Britannica and at nearly half the price ($5 versus $9 per volume). His right to do so was upheld in an infamous decision by Justice Arthur Butler who argued that:

To reproduce a foreign publication is not wrong. There may be differences of opinion about the morality of republishing a work here that is copyrighted abroad; but the public policy of this country, as respects the subject, is in favor of such replication...It is supposed to have an influence upon the advance of learning and intelligence.

Another successful infringer was Henry G. Allen, who developed a photographic reproduction method for the Britannica and charged only half as much as Stoddart ($2.50 per volume). Other people alleged to have copied the ninth edition included John Wanamaker and the Reverend Isaac Kaufmann Funk of the Funk and Wagnalls encyclopedia. Richard S. Pearle & Co. of Chicago photoengraved some sets in 1891, and added three volumes of "American Revisions and additions," the first two in 1891 and the third in 1892. In 1893, they published sets with volumes 1–24 from the original Britannica, the three "American" volumes 25–27, and the index as Vol. 28. Some copies of this version say they were printed by Werner, also of Chicago, and from 1902 to 1907 Werner printed the commonly found "New Werner Edition," of 30 volumes (24 volumes plus five New American Supplement volumes and a new index for all 29 volumes). In 1890, James Clarke published the Americanized Encyclopædia Britannica, Revised and Amended which was only 10 volumes, as was the 1895 Belford-Clark issue by the same name (Chicago).

In addition to American unauthorized copies, there were American supplements which were written to be appended to authorized copies of Britannica. The Hubbard Brothers of Philadelphia produced a 5-volume American supplement between 1882 and 1889, in quality leather bindings designed to match the authorized volumes in appearance. Of good scholarship, it contained biographies of Americans and geographies of US places, as well as other US interests not mentioned in the main encyclopedia.

In 1896, Scribner's Sons, which had claimed US copyright on many of the articles, obtained court orders to shut down bootlegger operations, some of whose printing plates were melted down as part of the enforcement. Publishers were able to get around this order, however, by re-writing the articles that Scribner's had copyrighted; for example, the "United States" article in Werner's 1902 unlicensed edition was newly written and copyrighted by R.S. Pearle.

In 1903, Saalfield Publishing published the Americanized Encyclopædia Britannica in 8 volumes with a 4 volume supplement (when the British edition had 24 volumes). The Encyclopædia Britannica Company had acquired all the rights to the encyclopedia in America. In addition, D. Appleton & Company claimed that the 4 volume supplement used material from Appletons' Cyclopædia of American Biography. To avoid further litigation, the suit against Saalfield Publishing was settled in court "by a stipulation in which the defendants agree not to print or sell any further copies of the offending work, to destroy all printed sheets, to destroy or melt the portions of the plates from which the infringing matter in the Supplement as it appears in the Americanized Encyclopædia Britannica has been printed, and to pay D. Appleton & Co. the sum of $2000 damages."

Horace Everett Hooper was an American businessman, and a close associate of James Clarke, one of the leading American bootleggers. Hooper recognized the potential profit in the Britannica and, again in 1896, learned that both the Britannica and The Times of London were in financial straits. Hooper formed a partnership with Clarke, his brother George Clarke, and Walter Montgomery Jackson to sell the Britannica under the sponsorship of The Times, meaning that The Times would advertise the sale and lend its respectable name. Hooper and his energetic advertising manager, Henry Haxton, introduced many innovative sales methods: full-page advertisements in The Times, testimonials from celebrities, buying on installment plans, and a long series of so-called 'final offers'. Although the crass marketing was criticized as inappropriate to the Britannica's history and scholarship, the unprecedented profits delighted the manager of The Times, Charles Frederic Moberly Bell, who assessed Hooper as "a ranker who loved to be accepted as a gentleman. Treat him as a gentleman and one had no trouble with him; treat him as an essentially dishonest ranker and one got all the trouble there was to get." The American partnership sold more than 20,000 copies of the Britannica in the United States (four runs of 5,000), after which Hooper and Jackson bought out the two Clarke brothers in early 1900. A & C Black had moved to London in 1895 and, on 9 May 1901, sold all the rights to the Britannica to Hooper and Jackson, then living in London.

The sale of the Britannica to Americans has left a lingering resentment among some British citizens, especially when it is perceived that parochial American concerns are emphasized. For example, one British critic wrote on the centenary of the sale:

The full horror of what an American editorial monopoly entails is seldom appreciated. The American editors who write short in-house articles are ignorant and parochial...The Encyclopædia Britannica is a publication so contemptuous of Britain, the land of its birth, that it cannot be bothered to ascertain correct usage when speaking of the Thames, a publication so insular as to give an entry to Alan Whicker but none to Lords Carrington or Whitelaw. It amounts to more than impertinence.

— Charles Mosley, in the Manchester Guardian Weekly (10 July 1988)

== First American editions (10th–14th, 1901–1973) ==
=== Tenth edition (supplement to the 9th), 1902–03 ===
Again under the sponsorship of The Times of London, and with Adam & Charles Black in the UK, the new owners quickly produced an 11-volume supplement to the ninth edition; being nine volumes of text, 25–33, a map volume, 34, which was 1 inch taller than the other volumes, and a new index, vol 35, also an inch taller than 25–33, which covered the first 33 volumes (the maps volume 34 had its own index). The editors were Hugh Chisholm, Sir Donald Mackenzie Wallace, Arthur T. Hadley and Franklin Henry Hooper, the brother of the owner Horace Hooper.

Notable contributors to the 10th edition included Laurence Binyon, Ludwig Boltzmann, Walter Camp (articles on "Base-ball" and "Rowing"), Laurence Housman, Joseph Jefferson, Frederick Lugard, 1st Baron Lugard, Frederic William Maitland, John Muir (article on "Yosemite"), Fridtjof Nansen (articles on "Greenland" and "Polar Regions: The Arctic Ocean"), Alfred Harmsworth, 1st Viscount Northcliffe (part of article on "Newspapers"), Sir Flinders Petrie (part of article on "Egyptology"), Gifford Pinchot, Sir Arthur Thomas Quiller-Couch, John William Strutt, 3rd Baron Rayleigh (article on "Argon"), Bertrand Russell, Carl Schurz, Sir Charles Scott Sherrington and Sir J. J. Thomson.

Taken together, the 35 volumes were dubbed the "10th edition". The re-issue of the ninth edition under the moniker "10th edition" caused some outrage, since many articles of the ninth edition were more than 25 years old. This led to the popular joke: "The Times is behind the Encyclopædia Britannica and the Encyclopædia Britannica is behind the times."

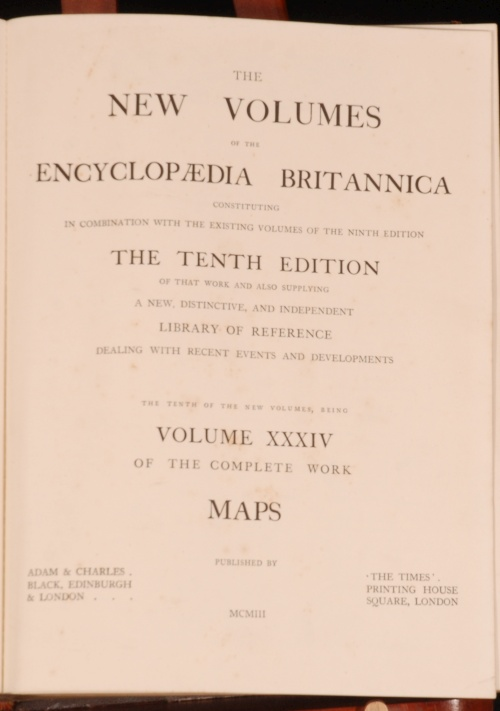
A & C. Black and The Times of London produced the 10th edition

The 1903 advertising campaign for the 10th edition was an onslaught of direct marketing: hand-written letters, telegrams, limited-time offers, etc.. The following quote, written in 1926, captures the mood

Who that is old enough does not remember the "campaign" of 1903, the insidious payment by instalments, the sets dumped at your door, bookcase and all, on receipt of a guinea, the scholarships, the competition questions, the reply-paid telegrams pursuing you to the innermost sanctuary of your home ("From my bath I curse you", one man wired back!), the "Going, going, gone" tactics—"Only five days left and one of them the shortest!" so irrelevant, but so arresting!

— Janet E. Courtney, long-time employee of the Britannica, from her book, Recollected in Tranquillity

An excellent collection of prospectuses received by a single person (C. L. Parker) in that year has been preserved by the Bodleian Library (catalogued under #39899.c.1). The advertising was clearly targeted at middle and lower-middle-class people seeking to improve themselves. The advertising campaign was remarkably successful; more than 70,000 sets were sold, bringing in profit of more than £600,000. When one British expert expressed surprise to Hooper that so many people would want an outdated encyclopedia, he replied: "They didn't; I made them want it."

Even after the 10th edition was published, some American infringement companies were still printing thousands of copies of the Ninth without the supplements. See above. Some of these companies were adding their own "Americanized" supplements, but none of them reproduced the Tenth. Copyright violation did not end until shortly before the 11th edition came out.

=== Eleventh edition, 1910 ===
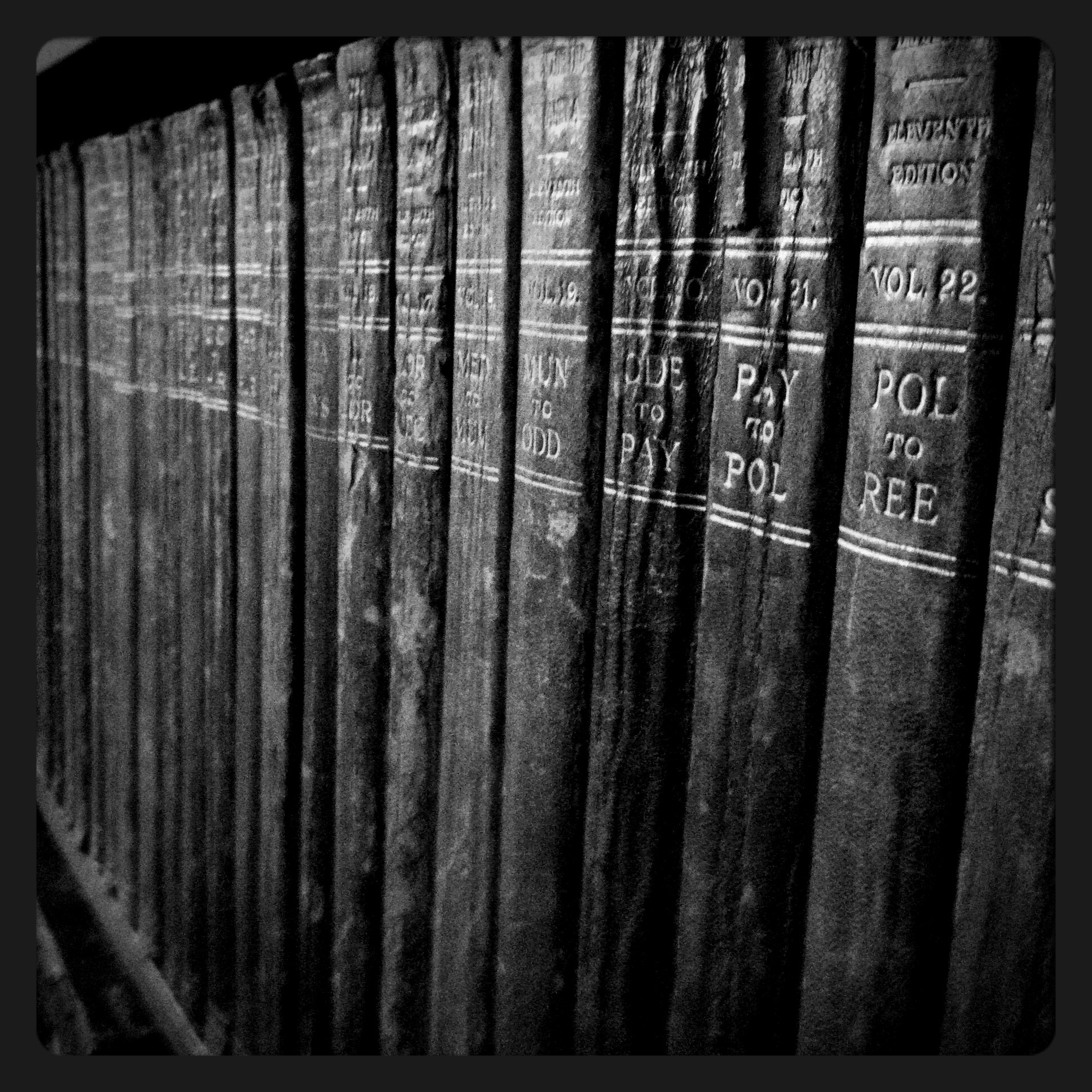
Encyclopædia Britannica, Eleventh Edition

The renowned 11th edition of Encyclopædia Britannica was begun in 1903, and published in 1910–1911 in 28 volumes, with a one-volume Index. Edited by Hugh Chisholm in London and by Franklin Henry Hooper in New York, the 11th edition was the first to be published substantially at one time, instead of volume by volume. Its illustrious contributors are legion, including Baden Baden-Powell writing on kite-flying; Arthur Eddington on astronomy; Edmund Gosse on literature and Donald Tovey on music. Sometimes called the 1911 Encyclopædia Britannica, this edition is still highly regarded for its lucid explanations of scholarly subjects. Being in the public domain, the complete text is freely available online. The 11th edition retained the high scholarship and eminent contributors that marked the ninth edition, but tempered that scholarship with shorter, simpler articles that were more intelligible to lay-readers. Thus, the 9th and 11th editions had 17,000 and 40,000 articles, respectively, although they were roughly equivalent in size. This shift accommodated the American business strategy of popularizing the Britannica for a mass market, while still retaining its quality as a reference work. The high literary and scholarly level of the 11th edition is largely due to the zeal of its owner, Horace Everett Hooper, who held scholarship in high regard and spared no expense to make the 11th edition as excellent as possible.

After a heated legal dispute and all-too-public corporate wrangling over ownership of the Britannica (1908–1909), Hooper bought out Walter Jackson, becoming the sole owner of the Britannica. The public furor caused The Times to cancel its sponsorship contract with Hooper, feeling that the interests of the newspaper were not being served. After failing to win over Oxford University, Hooper managed to secure Cambridge University as a new sponsor; thus, the 11th edition was published initially by Cambridge University Press, and scholars from Cambridge University were allowed to review the text and veto any overly aggressive advertising. Perhaps because of this, the Britannica encountered financial difficulties, whereupon it was licensed to Sears Roebuck and Co. of Chicago, who issued a physically smaller but complete version known as the "handy edition," with each volume almost pocket-sized. The owner of Sears, philanthropist Julius Rosenwald, was friends with Horace Hooper and enthusiastic about the Britannica's promise; he single-handedly saved the Britannica from bankruptcy several times over the next 15 years. Although Sears' handy set was successful in 1915–1916, sales dropped significantly when the United States entered World War I.

The 11th edition employed 35 named female contributors, out of 1,500 total (2.3%). Although this was not much of an increase over the 10th edition (which named 37 female contributors out of 1,800 in total), it was heralded publicly as a major advance in recognizing the contributions of women in learned circles. However, the 11th edition did employ hundreds of women to write unsigned articles; some women, such as Irish medical expert Harriet Hennessy, even rose to be (uncredited) department editors.

Sales figures for the 11th edition were comparable to those of the 9th, which sold hundreds of thousands of copies including the unlicensed sets. Unlike the 9th, however, the 11th edition was not infringed, all sets being printed legitimately by Britannica. It can be seen that the 9th and 11th editions sold far better than previous editions. This is mainly due to the increase in population of, and sales in, the United States, which were mere colonies with low population when Britannica started out in 1768.

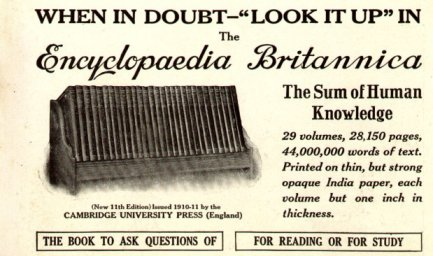
1913 advertisement for the 11th edition of Encyclopædia Britannica, with the slogan "When in doubt—"look it up" in the Encyclopædia Britannica"

=== Twelfth and thirteenth editions (competing supplements to the eleventh) ===
The poor sales of the war years brought the Britannica to the brink of bankruptcy. The CEO of Sears Roebuck, philanthropist Julius Rosenwald, was devoted to the mission of the Britannica and bought its rights on 24 February 1920 from his friend Horace Everett Hooper for $1.25 million. In 1922, a three-volume supplement to the 11th edition was released that summarized the developments just before, during and after World War I; these three volumes, taken together with the 11th edition of 1910, became known as the 12th edition. The articles describing World War I and the political changes brought about by it took up a large portion of the supplement, but articles on such things as radio (still called wireless telephony) are informative. The editor of the supplement was Hugh Chisholm, who also had been the main editor of the 11th edition, as well as the 1902 11-volume supplement to the ninth edition, known as the 10th edition. Horace Hooper died in 1922, a few weeks after the publication of the 12th edition. This edition was a commercial failure, losing Sears roughly $1.75 million, after which Sears gave it back to Hooper's widow, Harriett Meeker Cox, and her brother, William J. Cox, who ran the company from 1923 to 1928.

The passage of a few years led to a better perspective on that era. In 1926, the Britannica released three new volumes covering the history of 1910–1926, which were intended to supplant those of the 12th edition. Again taken together with the 11th edition, the new volumes became known as the 13th edition, which maintained the Britannica's tradition of illustrious contributors: Harry Houdini, Albert Einstein, Marie Curie, Sigmund Freud, Henry Ford, Leon Trotsky, Ferdinand Foch, Gustav Stresemann, Thomas G. Masaryk and Elihu Root.

In 1928, Rosenwald bought back the rights to the Britannica, leaving Cox as publisher. Cox argued forcefully for a new 14th edition, pointing out that the 11th edition (the bulk of the 12th and 13th editions) was badly out of date. Cox also tried to involve the University of Chicago in producing the Britannica, even including a $1 million advance from Rosenwald as a temptation; however, the trustees of the University turned down his proposal, a choice they almost repeated a generation later under William Benton.

=== Fourteenth edition, 1929 ===
By 1926, the 11th edition was beginning to show its age, and work on a new edition was begun. The editors were J. L. Garvin in London and Franklin Henry Hooper in New York. It has 24 volumes, reduced from 29 in the 11th edition, yet has 45,000 articles compared to 37,000. It has 15,000 illustrations, of which 1,500 are full plates. The 14th edition took three years to complete, at the then exorbitant cost of $2.5 million, all of it invested by Julius Rosenwald of Sears, Roebuck and Company. It was very different from the 11th edition, having fewer volumes and simpler articles, continuing the business strategy of popularizing the Britannica for the American mass market at the expense of its scholarship. The 14th edition also drew criticism for deleting information unflattering to the Roman Catholic Church. Nevertheless, the 14th also included many illustrious contributors, including 18 Nobel laureates in science, such as Robert Millikan, Albert Abraham Michelson and Arthur Compton. More coverage was given to popular entertainment, with Gene Tunney writing on boxing, Lillian Gish on acting and Irene Castle on ballroom dancing. George Bernard Shaw contributed a well-regarded article on socialism. In all, there were roughly 3,500 named contributors, of which roughly half were American. The 14th edition was again criticized for sexism, by a woman who wrote to editor Walter Yust that too many biographies were of men; Yust made a count and found that 6% of its 13,000 biographies were of women.

The 14th edition was published in September 1929, and had 23 volumes with a one-volume Index that also contained a complete atlas. Unfortunately, the Great Depression struck scarcely a month after the release of the 14th edition, and sales plummeted. Despite the unfailing support of the Sears Roebuck company, the Britannica almost went bankrupt over the next few years. Rosenwald died in 1932, and General Robert E. Wood took over; Cox was removed as publisher and the Secretary-Treasurer of Sears, Elkan Harrison Powell, was installed as the new President of the Britannica. In that same year, the Britannica's headquarters were moved to Chicago, where they have remained.

=== Policy of continuous revision ===
E. H. Powell identified and fixed a key vulnerability of Britannica, namely, that its sales (and, hence, the company's income) fluctuated strongly over the life-cycle of an edition. After the release of a new edition, sales would generally begin strong, and decline gradually for 10–20 years as the edition began to show its age; finally, sales would drop off precipitously with the announcement that work had begun on a new edition, since few people would buy an obsolete encyclopedia that would soon be updated. These strong fluctuations in sales led to economic hardship for the Britannica.

To address this problem, Powell suggested in 1933 the policy of continuous revision, with the goal of keeping the Britannica "always timely and always salable". The basic idea was to maintain a continuous editorial staff that would constantly revise the articles on a fixed schedule. Earlier encyclopedias did not maintain a continuous editorial staff, but rather assembled one just prior to beginning a new edition. Rather than releasing supplemental editions or volumes, new printings would be made every year with only enough copies made to cover the sales for that year. An analysis of the Britannica's articles suggested that roughly 75% required only occasional revising, whereas 25% required revision every 1–3 years. The articles were therefore divided into 30 classifications and a schedule for their revision worked out, such that every article would be checked at least twice a decade.

Powell also conceived the Britannica's "Book of the Year", in which a single volume would be released every year covering the developments of the previous year, particularly in rapidly changing fields such as science, technology, culture and politics. The "Book of the Year" was published in print annually from 1938 to 2018. Powell also introduced the Library Research Service (1936), in which owners of the Britannica could write to have their personal questions researched and answered by the editorial staff.

Under Powell's leadership, the Britannica began to capitalize on its reputation by aggressively developing "spin-offs", such as the 12-volume Britannica Junior for children (published 1934, and revised to 15 volumes in 1947), the historical timeline The March of Man (published 1935, and edited by Albert Bushwell Hart, Isaac J. Cox and Lawrence H. Dawson), the Encyclopædia Britannica World Atlas (published 1942, and prepared by G. Donald Hudson) and 10 Eventful Years, a summary of the national and international events surrounding World War II (1937–1946).

=== Transfer of ownership to William Benton ===
Sears Roebuck published the Britannica until 1943. In 1941, Sears offered the rights to the Britannica as a gift to the University of Chicago. The story of this offer was recounted at the bicentennial banquet of the Encyclopædia Britannica

It was after lunch on the afternoon of December 9, 1941 that General Robert E. Wood, Chairman of Sears, Roebuck and William Benton, then vice-president of the University of Chicago, were discussing the attack on Pearl Harbor which had occurred two days earlier. At the end of this conversation, as coffee was served, Bill changed the subject and said to Wood, "General, don't you think it is rather unsuitable for a mail-order house to own the Encyclopædia Britannica, and isn't it even more unsuitable in wartime?"

"Yes", replied General Wood, "Sears, Roebuck should never have acquired it in the first place."

"Does it make any money?" Bill asked. Wood replied that sales would earn his company some $300,000 before taxes that year. Bill replied, "Well, General, you know that universities do not have any money. They cannot buy businesses. Why don't you make a gift of the Britannica to the University of Chicago?"

General Wood did not reply immediately but walked to his car. As he got into the car, he turned to Bill Benton and said, "All right, Bill, I will give you the Britannica."

The University of Chicago declined the offer, viewing the mission of the university as not entirely consistent with a large commercial publishing house; however it continues even today to be involved in its production, offering editorial advice and allowing its name to be associated with the Britannica.

Thus, in 1943, the wealthy and powerful William Benton, a former U.S. senator and advertising executive, obtained exclusive control of the Britannica, which he published until his death in 1973. His widow Helen Hemingway Benton continued to publish the Britannica until her own death in 1974. The Benton Foundation continued to manage the Britannica from 1980 until it was sold to Jacqui Safra in 1996. The University of Chicago was the sole beneficiary of the Foundation, and in the mid-1990s the university provided funding to stem the encyclopedia's losses.

== Fifteenth edition ==
=== First version (1974–1984) ===
Despite the policy of continuous revision, the 14th edition of the Britannica gradually became outdated. Beginning in the early 1960s, the failings of the 14th edition began to be collated and published by physicist Harvey Einbinder, culminating in his highly critical 390-page book, The Myth of the Britannica (1964). Goaded into action, the Britannica began to work on a new edition, the current 15th.

The 15th edition was produced over 10 years at a cost of $32 million and released in 1974 in 30 volumes. The so-called New Encyclopædia Britannica (or Britannica 3) had a unique three-part organization: a single Propædia (Primer for Education) volume, which aimed to provide an outline of "all known information"; a 10-volume Micropædia (Small Education) of 102,214 short articles (strictly less than 750 words); and a 19-volume Macropædia (Large Education) of 4,207 longer, scholarly articles with references, similar to those of the ninth and 11th editions. The Micropædia and Macropædia articles are listed in alphabetical order; the 4,287 contributors to the Macropædia articles are identified scrupulously, but the Micropædia articles are generally anonymous and unreferenced.

This 15th edition had no general index, which had been a feature of the Britannica since its seventh edition; even in the second edition, individual long articles had their own indices. The idea of Mortimer J. Adler was that the Propædia and the Micropædia could serve the role of an index. More generally, Adler felt that the Britannica should not merely serve as a reference work, but also aspire to be a categorization of omne scibile (everything knowable), to fulfill Francis Bacon's grand conception of epistemology. Thus, the Propædia was intended to be the road-map of all knowledge, within which every fact, technique, and theory could be organized. With this edition EB became the first encyclopedia that serves both functions of fact-checking and self-education.

The lack of an index and the unusual organization into two sets of alphabetically organized articles provoked much criticism. In a typical contemporary assessment, "It is called the Micropædia, for 'little knowledge,' and little knowledge is what it provides. It has proved to be grotesquely insufficient as an index, radically constricting the utility of the Macropædia." or, more laconically, "This arrangement has nothing to recommend it except commercial novelty". Most readers could not predict whether a given subject would be found in Micropædia or the Macropædia; the criteria by which the articles were sorted were not obvious even to scholars, despite Adler's claims that the sorting followed naturally from the Propædia's outline of all knowledge.

=== Second version (1985–2010) ===
In 1985, the Britannica responded to reader requests by restoring the index as a two-volume set. The number of topics indexed by the Britannica has fluctuated from 500,000 (1985, the same as in 1954) to 400,000 (1989,1991) to 700,000 in the 2007 print version. Presumably, this recent increase reflects the introduction of efficient electronic indexing, since the size of the encyclopedia has remained nearly constant at approximately 40 million words from 1954 to the present and far less than 40% of the encyclopedia has changed from 1985 to 2007.

Under the editorship of Philip W. Goetz, the 1985 version of the 15th edition introduced other major changes. The 4,207 articles of the first version Macropædia were combined into 674 longer articles; for example, the individual articles for each of the 50 U.S. states were merged into what became a 310-page article "United States of America". The Macropædia was also restricted somewhat from 19 volumes to the present 17 volumes. At the same time, the number of Micropædia volumes was increased from 10 to the present 12 volumes, although the number of articles was reduced from 102,214 to roughly 65,000. The strict 750-word limit was softened to allow articles of medium length, such as Internet, which almost fills one page. Superficially, the Propædia's Outline of Knowledge was simplified for easier use. In reality, by breaking the intrinsic links between a topic in Propædia with its associated EB articles the intended function (or usefulness) of Propædia is hindered significantly.

On March 14, 2012, Britannica announced it would not be printing any more sets of its paper version, which accounted for less than 1 percent of its sales, and would instead focus on its DVD and online versions. It had not printed any new sets since 2010.

== Global Edition ==
Britannica Global Edition was printed in 2009. It contained 30 volumes and 18,251 pages, with 8,500 photographs, maps, flags, and illustrations in smaller "compact" volumes. It contained more than 40,000 articles written by scholars from across the world, including Nobel Prize winners. Unlike the 15th edition, it did not contain Macro- and Micropedia sections, but ran A through Z as all editions up to the 14th had. It currently is out of print and sold out. The last printing was in 2011. The following is Britannica's description of the work:

The editors of Encyclopædia Britannica, the world standard in reference since 1768, present the Britannica Global Edition. Developed specifically to provide comprehensive and global coverage of the world around us, this unique product contains thousands of timely, relevant, and essential articles drawn from the Encyclopædia Britannica itself, as well as from the Britannica Concise Encyclopedia, the Britannica Encyclopedia of World Religions, and Compton’s by Britannica. Written by international experts and scholars, the articles in this collection reflect the standards that have been the hallmark of the leading English-language encyclopedia for over 240 years.

The Britannica International Encyclopedia is the Japanese edition of the Encyclopedia Britannica, published by Britannica Japan. Published by TBS Britannica since 1972, Britannica Japan took over the publishing business in 2000. The International Encyclopedia Britannica consists of the Encyclopedia of Small Entries, the Encyclopedia of Large Entries, and the International Yearbook.

== Development of electronic versions ==
In the 1980s, Microsoft approached Britannica to collaborate on a CD-ROM encyclopedia, but the offer was declined. Senior managers at Britannica were confident in their control of the market and that their healthy profits would continue. At this time complete sets of the encyclopedia were priced between $1,500 and $2,200, and the product was considered part of a luxury brand with an impeccable reputation handed down from generation to generation. The management did not believe that a CD-ROM could adequately compete or supplement their business. Microsoft responded by using content from Funk & Wagnalls Standard Encyclopedia to create what is now known as Encarta.

In 1981, the first digital version of the Britannica was created for the LexisNexis service.

In 1990, the Britannica's sales reached an all-time high of $650 million, but Encarta, released in 1993, soon became a software staple with almost every computer purchase and the Britannica's market share plummeted. Britannica countered by offering a CD-ROM version of their product, although it could not generate the print version's $500–600 in sales commissions. Britannica decided to charge $995 for just the CD-ROM, while bundling a free disc with the print version, hoping that including the CD-ROM would persuade buyers to stay with the brand.

In 1994, an online version was launched (now Britannica.com), with subscriptions for sale for $2,000. By 1996 the price of the CD-ROM had dropped to $200, and sales had dropped to $325 million—about half of their 1990 levels. Only 55,000 hard copy versions were sold in 1994, compared with 117,000 in 1990, and sales later fell to 20,000. Facing financial pressure, Britannica was bought in 1996 by Swiss financier Jacob Safra for $135 million, a fraction of its book value. Safra introduced severe price-cutting measures to try to compete with Encarta, even offering the entire reference free of charge for a time (around 18 months, from October 1999 to March 2001) on the Internet.

In 2003, Britannica co-operated with a Taiwanese company to provide a Traditional Chinese-English bilingual online encyclopedia following the 2002 edition of Britannica Concise Encyclopaedia (the first bilingual product of Britannica) and announced plans to translate the rest of the encyclopedia into Chinese.

Former editor-in-chief Robert McHenry believes that Britannica failed to exploit its early advantages in the market for electronic encyclopedias. Britannica had, for example, published the second multimedia encyclopedia titled Compton's MultiMedia Encyclopedia as early as 1989 (the first one being the Academic American Encyclopedia published by Grolier), but did not launch Britannica CD until 1994, a year after Microsoft launched their Encarta encyclopedia. McHenry believes these failures were due to a reluctance among senior management to fully embrace the new technology, caused largely by the overriding influence of the sales staff and management. The sales personnel earned commissions from door-to-door selling of the print encyclopedias, which McHenry believes led to decisions about the distribution and pricing of the electronic products being driven by the desires of the sales personnel rather than market conditions and customer expectations.

After ending publication of its print edition, which at the end supplied only 1% of the company's revenue, it hoped to transition to a CD or online version. Sales of both of these were disappointing — competition with Wikipedia is mentioned. Sales of the CD/DVD ended with the 2015 "Ultimate Reference Suite".
