= Franklin Henry Hooper =

American editor

Franklin Henry Hooper (January 28, 1862, Worcester, Massachusetts – August 14, 1940, Bedford Hills, New York) was a U.S. editor. His older brother Horace Everett Hooper was publisher of the Encyclopædia Britannica, and Franklin was an editor there. From 1932 to 1938 he was editor-in-chief.

Horace Hooper and Walter Jackson bought the Encyclopædia Britannica in 1901, holding it until 1920. Franklin Hooper was already an editor there, having joined the staff in 1899. During his tenure, five editions of the encyclopedia were published — the 10th in 1902-03; the highly regarded 11th in 1910-11; the 12th in 1922; the 13th in 1926; and the 14th in 1929. He was listed together with James Louis Garvin as one of the two editors of the 14th edition. Franklin became editor-in-chief in 1932.

Retiring in April 1938, he was succeeded as editor-in-chief by Walter Yust. Hooper died two years later of injuries sustained after being hit by a truck. This may have been due to his recklessness as a pedestrian. As noted in his obituary, he "persistently flouted traffic signals", and dismissed cautionary warnings from friends with the reply, "We are all going to die some day."

== Bibliography ==
- "These Eventful Years: The Twentieth Century in the Making, as Told by Many of Its Makers; Being the Dramatic Story of All that Has Happened Throughout the World During the Most Momentous Period in All History" (1924)
