= Benton Institute for Broadband & Society =

Foundation

- Formation: 1981
- Type: Nonprofit organization
- Headquarters: Evanston, IL, United States
- Executive Director: Revati Prasad
- Key people: Kevin Taglang; Robbie McBeath; Colin Rhinesmith; Kip Roderick; Adrianne B. Furniss
- Revenue: $378,188 (2018)
- Expenses: $984,656 (2018)
- Website: www.benton.org

The Benton Institute for Broadband & Society, until 2019 known as the Benton Foundation, is a nonprofit organization set up by former U.S. Senator William Benton and his wife, Helen Hemingway Benton. Their son, Charles Benton, was chairman and CEO until his death in 2015.

The Benton Foundation was the owner of the Encyclopædia Britannica from 1974 until 1996, when it was bought by Jacqui Safra.

== History ==
The formation of the Benton Foundation was announced at the bicentennial banquet for the Britannica in 1968. The mission of the Foundation was re-vamped somewhat in 1981 by Charles Benton, but it has always focused on using media for the public good, particularly for educational purposes.

Since 2001, Benton is home for the US center for OneWorld.net, a global information service, search engine, and network of organizations working for sustainable development and human rights.

The foundation has been most famous for its championing of digital access and for demanding public responsibility by mass media. The Benton Foundation has pushed for a national broadband policy at the highest levels of U.S. government. It has also been pushing the Federal Communications Commission (FCC) to determine the public interest obligations of digital television broadcasters. Finally, it has sponsored studies that suggest that concentration of media ownership in a few hands is not in the interests of the United States.

Leonard Jay Schrager became new chairman of Benton in 2015 following the death of Benton Foundation Founder and Chairman Charles Benton who died on 29 April 2015.

In 2019, the Benton Foundation became the Benton Institute for Broadband & Society.

Dr. Revati Prasad took over as Executive Director in May of 2025.

== Funding ==
Funding details as of 2018:
Revenue and support as of 2018: $378,188
1. Contributions, gifts, grants (63.0%)
2. Dividends, interest (24.0%)
3. Net gain or (loss) from sale of assets not on line 10 (13.0%)
Expenses as of 2018: $984,656
1. Legal fees, other fees (36.2%)
2. Compensation of officers (20.3%)
3. Other employee salaries and wages (17.0%)
4. Other expenses (11.9%)
5. Taxes, Depreciation, Occupancy (10.6%)
6. Pension plans (4.00%)

== Awards ==
=== Charles Benton Digital Equity Champion Award ===
The Charles Benton Digital Equity Champion Award honors governance and commitment to improving digital equity which ranges from propagating accessible and affordable communications technology for all Americans and its successful implementation.

Award winners:

- 2016 David Keyes

=== Charles Benton Next Generation Engagement Award ===
The Charles Benton Next Generation Engagement Award is a City award for competitive civic innovation which find groundbreaking and creative solutions to local challenges.

Recipients include:

- 2016 Raleigh, NC
- 2016 Austin, TX
- 2016 Louisville, KY

== Honors ==
On 9 February 2007, Benton Foundation Chairman and CEO Charles Benton received the Susan G. Hadden Pioneer Award from the Alliance for Public Technology for "pioneering efforts in telecommunications and consumer access."
