= Second edition of the Encyclopædia Britannica =

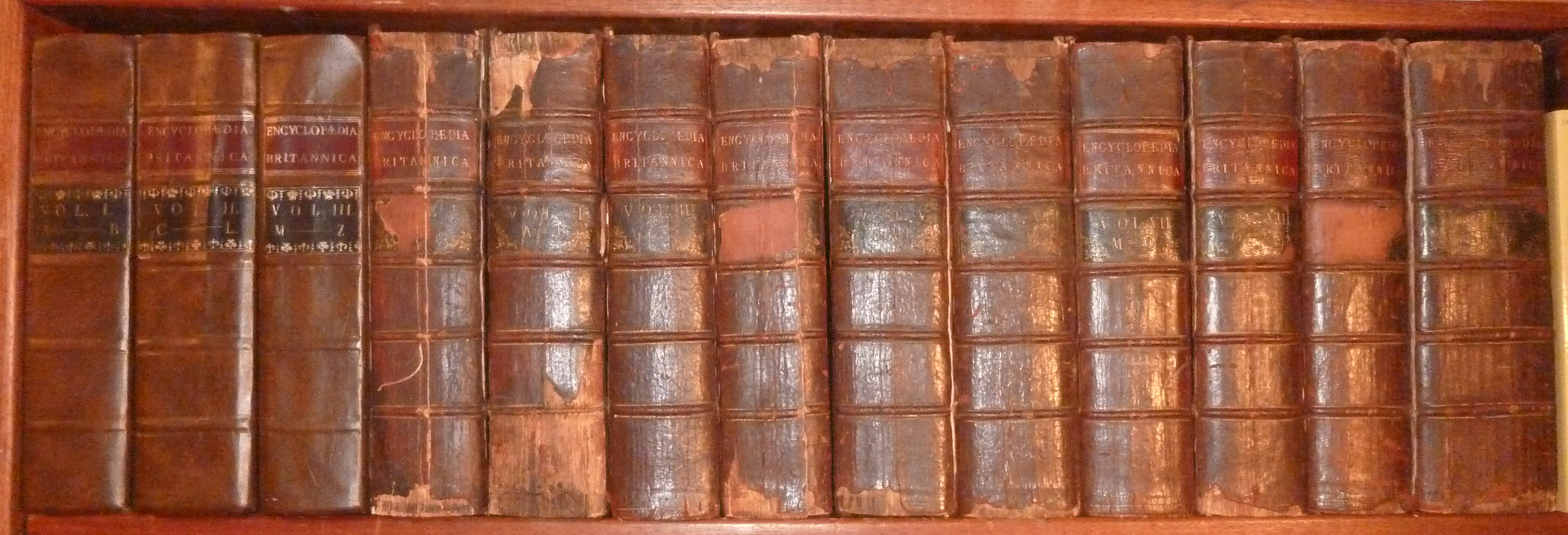
Encyclopædia Britannica, the three volumes on the left are the first edition replica, next 10 volumes are the second edition

The second edition (1777-83) of the Encyclopædia Britannica was a ten-volume encyclopedia published in Edinburgh, Scotland. It was spearheaded by the publishers of the first edition, Colin Macfarquhar and Andrew Bell. Like the first edition, it was published serially over a period of years. Most of the medical and scientific articles, as well as the minor articles, were compiled by James Tytler. All the copperplates were engraved by Bell.

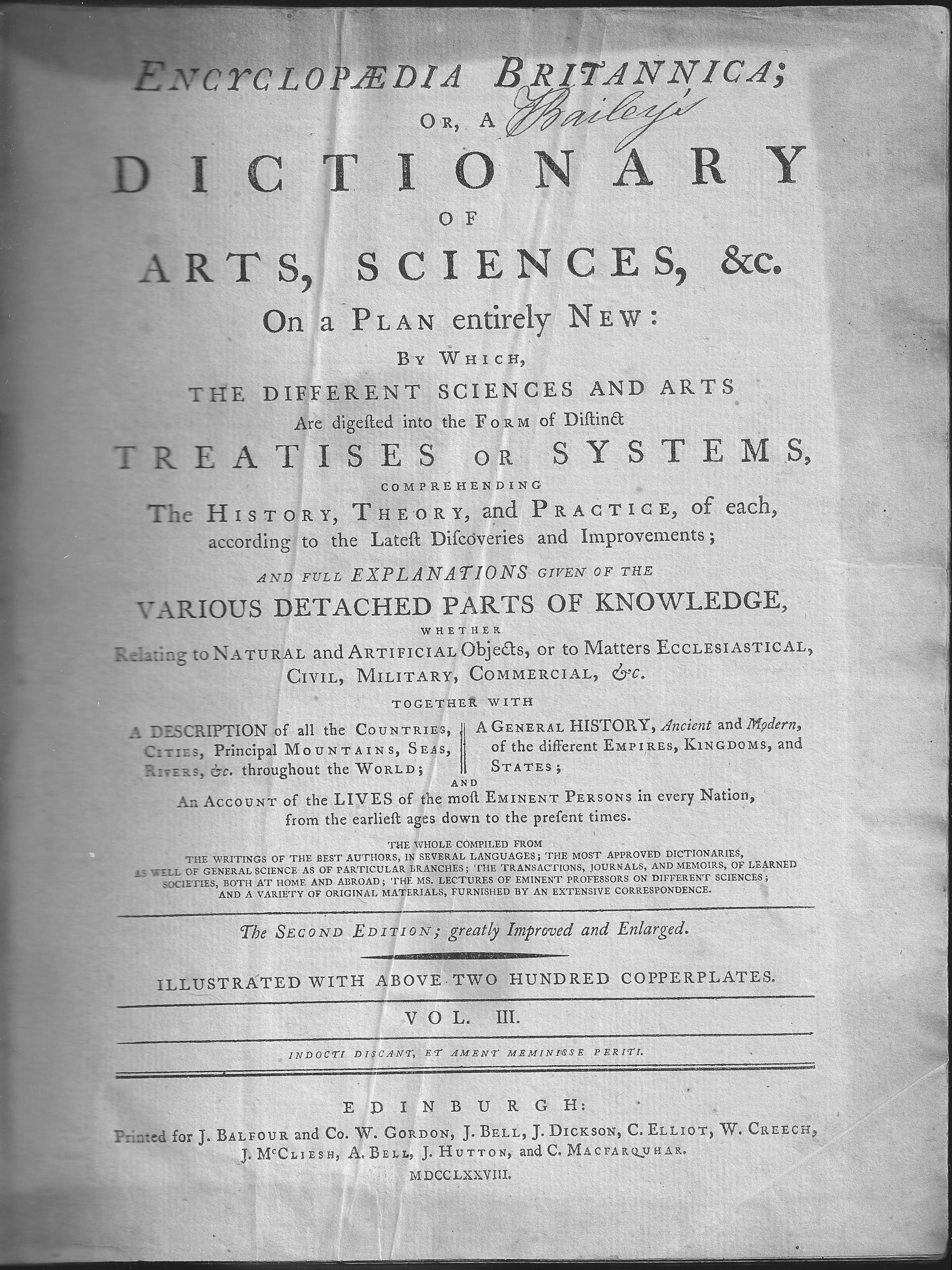
Second edition, Volume 3

== Publication ==
The modest success of the first edition determined Macfarquhar and Bell, the publishers, to undertake a second edition in 1777. To help finance it, they joined a consortium with eight other Scottish publishers, including Charles Elliot, who played a critical role in disseminating the work.

As of June 1777, Bell and Macfarquhar were still contemplating an edition comprising a hundred weekly installments, exactly the same number that went into the first edition. Now, however, they set the price at 1 shilling per installment, far more than the 6-8 pence demanded for installments of the first edition.

In the course of publication, the second edition expanded well beyond the publishers' initial projection. In the end, it was published in 181 numbers from 21 June 1777 to 18 September 1784. Bound together in ten volumes dated 1778-83 (even though publication stretched in 1784), it boasted more than 8,000 sloppily numbered pages and about 342 plates. In 1784, it cost 10 pounds, 10 shillings in boards.

Vol 1. A-AST (1778);
Vol 2. AST-BZO (1778);
Vol 3. C-CZO (1778);
Vol 4. D-FUZ (1779);
Vol 5. G-JYN (1780);
Vol 6. K-MED (1780);
Vol 7. MED-OPT (1781);
Vol 8. OPT-POE (1781);
Vol 9. POG-SCU (1782);
Vol 10. SCU-ZYG, plus a 199-page "Appendix: Containing Articles Omitted"

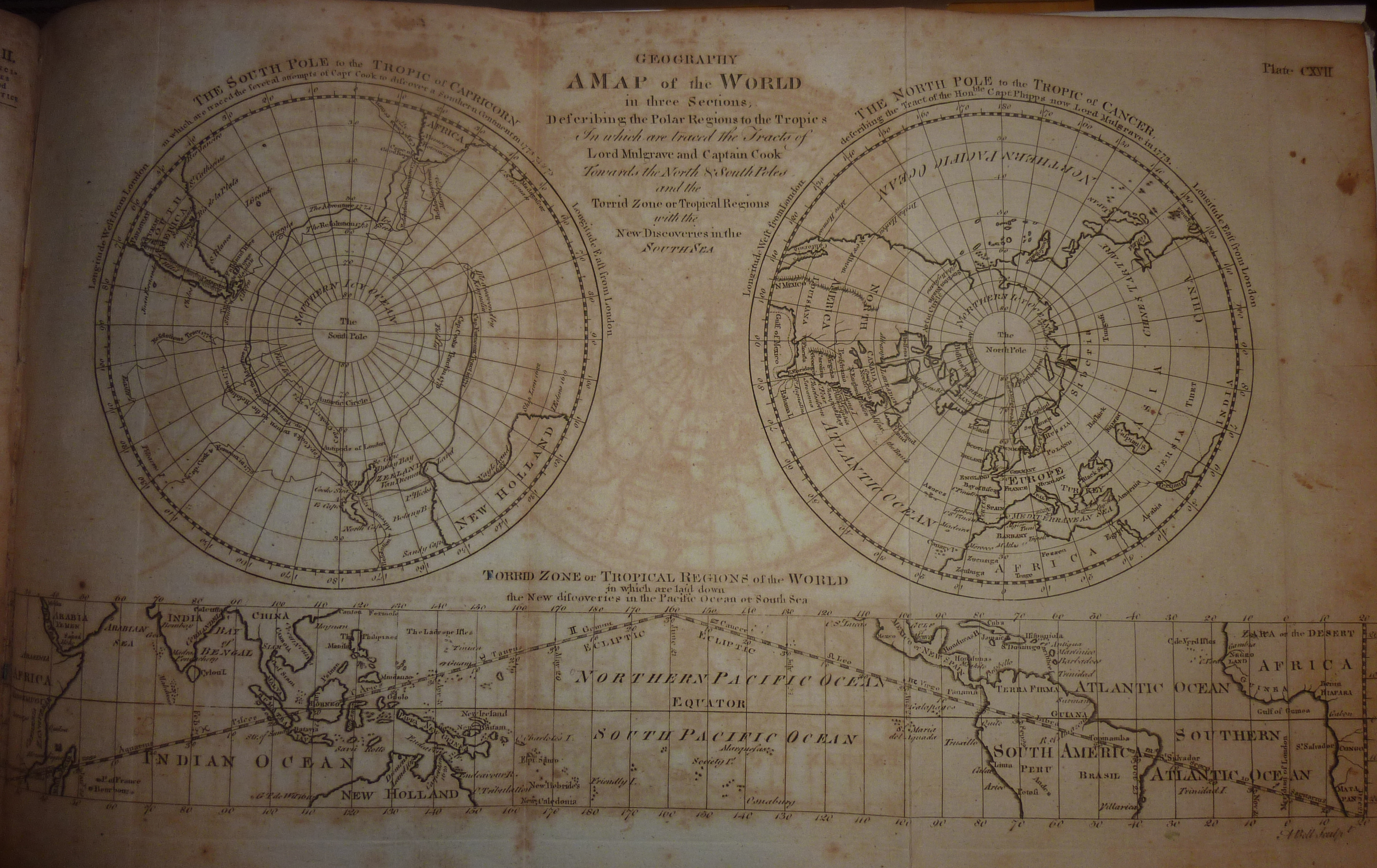
Map of the world in Geography article

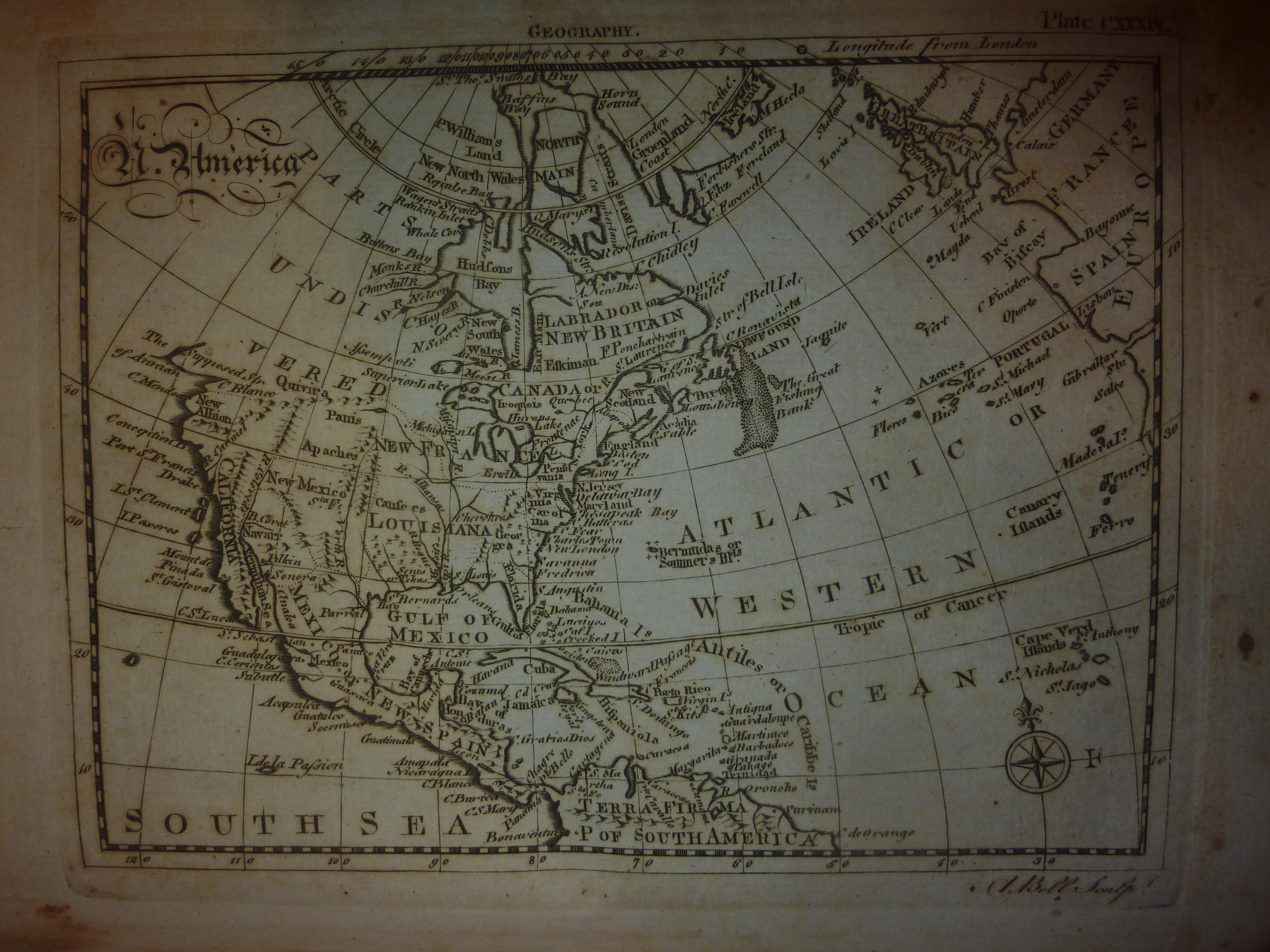
Map of North America in Geography article

== Collaborators and compilation ==
Unlike the first edition, the second edition was not ascribed to a "society of gentlemen." Nor was it ascribed to Tytler, the anonymous compiler.

As late as 1777, Smellie, the compiler of the first edition, had been considering working with the publishers on the second edition, but he finally declined, partly because he objected to the addition of biographical articles. Instead, the publishers recruited the financially struggling writer, printer, and surgeon-apothecary James Tytler, who was willing to work for about 16 shillings per week, less than Smellie had earned. Tytler was a polymath, educated by his father in classic languages, and at the University Edinburgh in medicine and other subjects, though he never completed a degree. The Scottish poet Robert Burns later portrayed the man he plausibly deemed responsible for most of the second edition in the following terms:

[There is] an obscure, tippling, but extraordinary body of the name of Tytler, commonly known by the name of Balloon Tytler, for his having projected a balloon: a mortal, who though he drudges about Edinburgh as a common printer, with leaky shoes and a sky-lighted hat; yet that same unknown drunken mortal is author and compiler of three fourths of Elliot's pompous Encyclopaedia Britannica.

On subjects he knew well, Tytler sometimes presented his own views. Having served as a surgeon on a whaling ship in 1765, for example, he drew on his personal experiences for articles on whales and whaling. Some of this material survived in editions of the Britannica through the mid-nineteenth century, serving as a source for Herman Melville's novel Moby-Dick (1851).

In 1796, Tytler claimed to have written "Aurora Borealis," "Chemistry," "Cold," "Deluge," "Earthquake," "Electricity," "Fire," "Fire-Ball," "Flame," "Heat," "Ignition," "Lightning," and "Meteorology" for the Britannica, although he may have been referring to the third edition. Regardless, we should not overestimate the nature of his authorship. "Electricity," for example, featured long sections of borrowed text in both editions.

For the most part, then, and especially on the subjects he was least familiar with, Tytler compiled the second edition by copying and pasting from contemporary sources. For example, in articles related to law, such as "Corporation," he took large sections of text from William Blackstone's Commentaries on the Laws of England. In compiling the many biographical articles, he borrowed heavily from Biographia Britannica and other sources, often copying word-for-word.

At least a few others contributed to the second edition as well. In the Supplement to the third edition (1801), the following quote appears in the article "Blacklock (Dr. Thomas)":

[W]e have reason to believe that he was the author of many articles in the second edition of the Encyclopedia Britannica, though we cannot say with certainty what those articles were. If our memory does not deceive us, we have been informed that the preface to that edition was furnished by him; and we have elsewhere attributed to him, on the best authority, the article BLIND, and the Notes to the article MUSIC; but he undoubtedly contributed much more to the work, and was one of the principal guides of the proprietors.

These claims appear plausible, since George Gleig, the editor of the Supplement, probably got his information from Bell or Macfarquhar.

In addition, the chart at the end of "History" is attributed to Adam Ferguson; part of the article "Logarithms" was "communicated" by an Irishman named Thomas Atkinson; and the article "Skating" expressed thanks to an anonymous member of the Skating Club of Edinburgh for contributing to it.

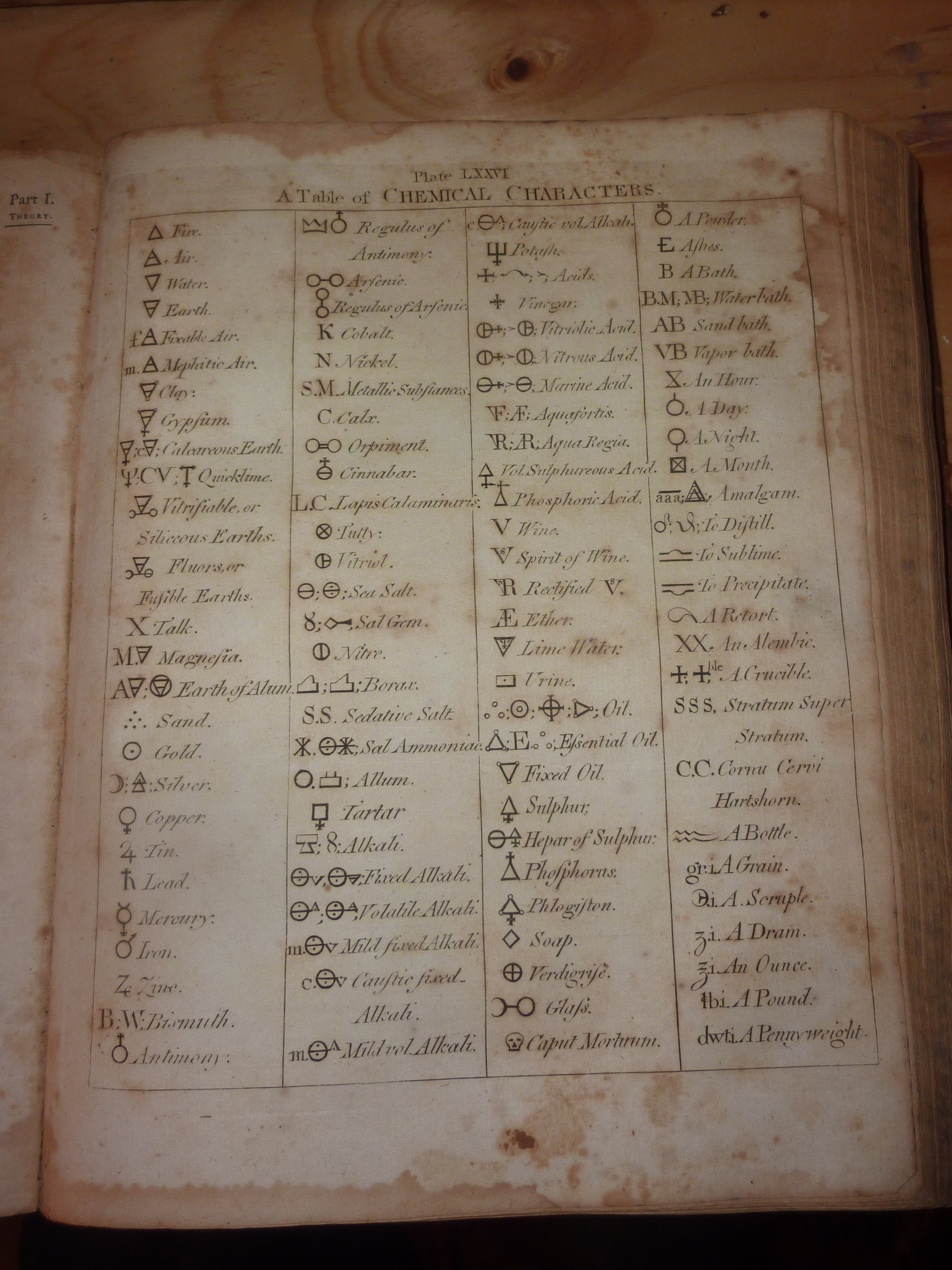
List of the main symbols used in chemistry before the periodic table was invented. From article "Chemistry" written by James Tytler.

== Organization, structure, and scope ==
=== Treatises ===
Like the first edition of the Britannica, the second edition was organized in a still novel manner in which typographically distinct "treatises" on arts and sciences were placed in a single alphabetical sequence alongside normal articles. Specifically, the second edition offered seventy-two treatises, almost twice as many as the first edition had. Eight of them extended to a hundred pages or more, and two were longer than any treatise in the first edition: "Medicine" (304 pages) and "Optics" (169 pages). Three of them, "Medicine," "Optics," and "Pharmacy," came with their own index.

=== Appendix ===
A 199-page supplement to the second edition appeared at the end of volume 10, entitled "Appendix: Containing Articles Omitted, and Others (Marked Encycl.) Further Explained or Improved; Together with Corrections of Errors and of Wrong References." It lacked its own title page, the pagination continuing from 8996 to 9195. Similar appendices had been published at the end of other encyclopedias, but not at the end of the first edition of the Britannica.

The supplement included articles such as "Entomology," "Gentoos" (on Hindus), "Ichthyology," and "Weather" as well as many new biographies, including one of the explorer James Cook. By one of the conventions of contemporary encyclopedia-making, individuals were usually only given a biographical article after their death. Cook had died in February 1779, too late to be covered in the volume for "C" (1778). The appendix also supplemented an earlier article on air with twenty-six new pages. Most of them were devoted the evolving science of air, with references to the experiments of Joseph Priestley and Antoine-Laurent Lavoisier, but the last nine pages report on air balloons, which had been used to raise humans since 1783 and developed into a cultural craze, "balloonomania." This was a passion of Tytler's, one that led him to make several, mostly unsuccessful balloon flights starting 1784 and 1785. Lastly, the appendix had ten plates, numbered CCCXIV to CCCXXIII. With over 1100 pages, volume 10 was thus thicker than the others, each of which had around 800 pages.

=== Scope ===
The first edition of the Encyclopaedia Britannica had been subtitled A Dictionary of Arts and Sciences. This was a reference to type of dictionary (or, in our terms, encyclopedia) that had developed in the late seventeenth century. In principle, dictionaries of the arts and sciences dealt with disciplines with a systematic structure and not with the simple facts of history or geography. By including thousands of geographical articles, the first edition had already strayed from the ideal of the dictionary of arts and sciences. By strengthening its coverage of geography and history and by allowing for biographical articles, the second edition of the Britannica continued the trend, which it acknowledged in a subtle way by using the subtitle A Dictionary of Arts, Sciences, &c. The Britannica's scope was now comparable to that of most general encyclopedias of the nineteenth and twentieth centuries.

== Contents ==
=== Accuracy ===
From today's perspective, much of the information in the second edition is archaic. For example, the treatise "Chemistry" affirms the existence of "phlogiston," a substance that Lavoisier and the "new" chemists were in the process of discrediting in the late eighteenth century. Copied from the first edition, along with the plate, the article "Ark" details the architecture of Noah's Ark, and the article "History" includes a timeline of history, credited to Ferguson, that begins with the Biblical Flood and numbers years from the Biblical creation of the world, giving the Nativity of Jesus as the year 4004. Many of the remedies proposed for illnesses in the second edition appear improbable now, including this one suggested for curing tuberculosis:

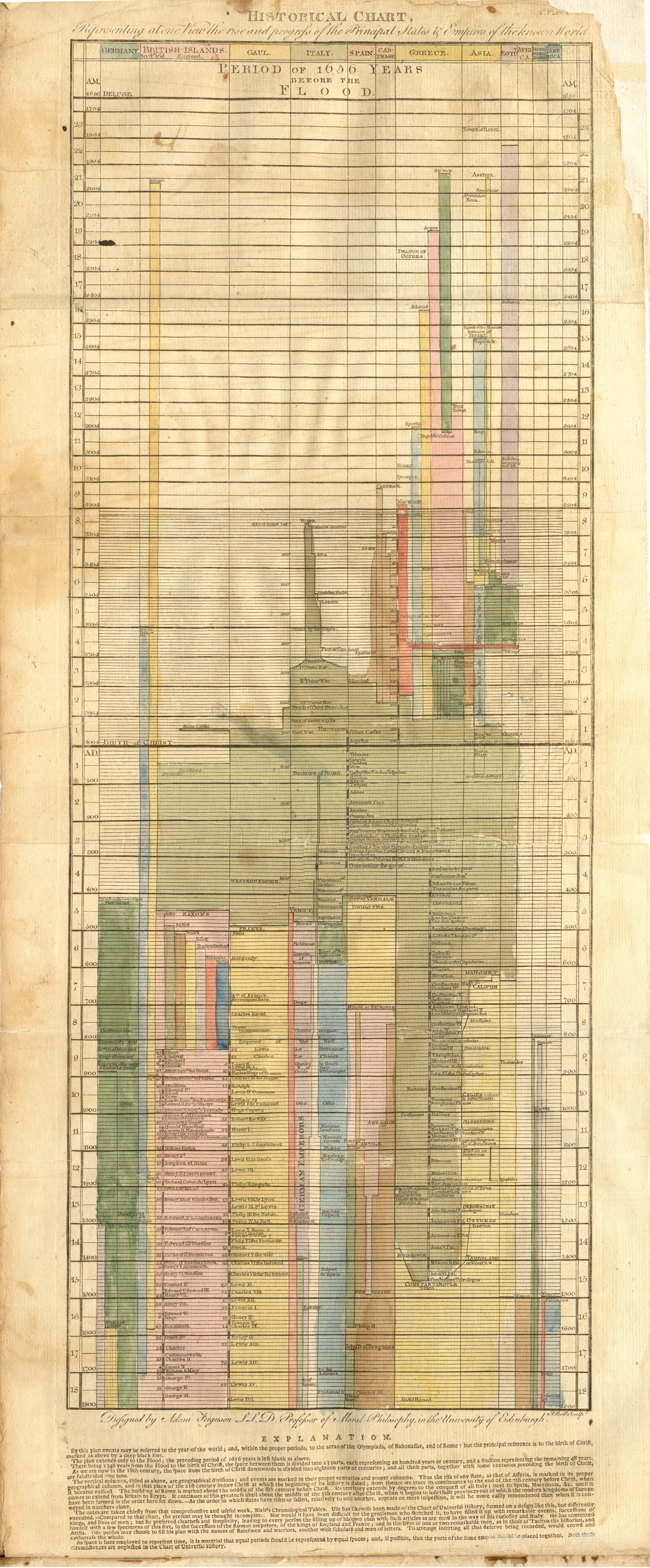
Historical timeline by Adam Ferguson, which accompanied the article "History"

He [the physician Francisco Solano de Luque] chose a spot of ground on which no plants had been sown, and there he made a hole large and deep enough to admit the patient up to the chin. The interstices of the pit were then carefully filled up with the fresh mould, so that the earth might every where come in contact with the patient's body. In this situation the patient was suffered to remain till he began to shiver or felt himself uneasy [....] The patient was then taken out, and, after being wrapped in a linen cloth, was placed upon a mattrass, and two hours afterwards his whole body was rubbed with an ointment composed of the leaves of the solanum nigrum and hog's lard.

With respect to eighteenth-century knowledge, however, the second edition comes across as far less old-fashioned. Much of "Chemistry" came from the works of Pierre-Joseph Macquer, a respected chemist. Biblical chronology was still widely endorsed in Europe in the late eighteenth century. And Solano's "remedy" for tuberculosis continued to be published in the medical literature into the early 1800s, including in The Edinburgh Practice of Medicine, Surgery, and Midwifery in 1803. More generally, the treatises "Materia Medica" and "Pharmacy" in the second edition were copied almost word for word from a recent edition of the New Dispensatory (1753), which grew out of the Edinburgh Pharmacopoeia, an official publication of the College of Physicians of Edinburgh.

In a manner more fair to the encyclopedia's eighteenth-century context, both Arthur Hughes and Richard Yeo have nonetheless found shortcomings in the state of scientific knowledge in the second edition. In a series of four articles on "Science in English Encyclopaedias, 1704-1875," Hughes finds much to criticize in the second edition and other works, but one of his more general conclusions is that too much was copied uncritically from previous encyclopedias, which led to the preservation of out-of-date knowledge. In the second edition, for example, the article "Stones," which conceived stones as plant-like, was taken from a fifty-year-old article in the Cyclopaedia. Yeo, for his part, notes that Tytler, as a scientific non-specialist, could hardly be expected to find all the best science to compile in the second edition. In France, the editors of the Encyclopédie (1751-72) had already entrusted much of the work of compiling to specialists, and the editors of the Britannica would do so in the third edition (1797). Compiling the second edition, Tytler had a reasonable acquaintance with many fields of science, but some of his personal views were at odds with the mainstream. It was almost certainly his personal views, for example, that led to the second edition's insistence on "electrical fluid" as a explanation for the phenomena of natural philosophy and led to the attacks on Newtonian physics in "Astronomy."

=== Coverage of the American colonies and revolution ===
The second edition is especially interesting to the American reader, as it was written during the American Revolutionary War. Volume 1 was written when New York City was occupied by the British Army, and the outcome of the war was still quite uncertain. Volume 10 was written the year after Charles Cornwallis surrendered, which led to recognition of the United States' sovereignty. In the nine-page article "Colony," Tytler discussed the British colonies in America and the causes of the revolution in an unsympathetic yet largely neutral and scholarly viewpoint:

And, because several of the colonies had claimed the sole and exclusive right of imposing taxes upon themselves, the statute 6 Geo. III. c. 12 expressly declares, that all his Majesty's colonies in America, have been, are, and of right ought to be, subordinate to and dependent upon the imperial crown and parliament of Great Britain; who have full power and authority to make laws and statutes of sufficient validity to bind the colonies and people of America, subjects to the crown of Great Britain in all cases whatsoever. And the attempting to enforce this by other acts of Parliament, penalties, and at last by military power, gave rise, as is well known, to the present revolt of our colonies."

In articles printed in earlier volumes of the set, places in the revolting colonies are still characterized as being British colonies, including New England in an article alphabetized under "E," though in "Boston," for example, mention is made of "the present American war." In volume 10, written at the end of the war, the article on Virginia describes it as "late one of the British colonies, now one of the United States of North America." Later in the same volume, in the article "York (New)," the correctly named "United States of America" is mentioned.

=== Maps ===
The treatise "Geography" article offers nineteen plates of maps, numbered CXVII to CXXXV. Two additional maps can be found in the articles "South Sea" and "Wind."

== Sales ==
It is not precisely known how well the second edition sold. Robert Kerr, who edited the memoirs of the first edition's editor, William Smellie, estimated that only 1,500 sets had been printed. But the Edinburgh wholesaler Charles Elliot, a partner of the publishers, sold that number of sets in less than a year, and Archibald Constable, who bought the Britannica in 1812 and had been distributing it since 1788, wrote that 4,500 sets had been printed. Furthermore, the fact that the price of a set in boards rose from 10 pounds, 10 shillings to 12 pounds in the 1780s suggests reasonably strong demand. In any event, the second edition was enough of a financial success that Bell and Macfarquhar began an even more ambitious third edition a few years later.
