= Charles Benton =

American businessman

- Born: February 13, 1931; New York City, US
- Died: April 29, 2015 (aged 84); Evanston, Illinois, US
- Education: Yale University; Northwestern University
- Occupations: Film distributor; CEO
- Parents: William Benton; Helen Hemingway Benton

Charles Benton (February 13, 1931 – April 29, 2015) was an American executive who was the CEO and chairman of the Benton Foundation, and CEO of Public Media Incorporated, a film and video publisher and distributor.

== Early life ==
Benton was born in New York City in 1931, the son of William and Helen Benton. Growing up, he stayed in New York and Connecticut in the summer, Chicago's south side during the winter, and in the spring Arizona. Benten graduated from Deerfield Academy in Massachusetts and received a bachelor's degree in 1953 from Yale University, and did post graduate work at Northwestern University.

== Career ==
In the 1960s, Benton worked at Encyclopaedia Britannica Films. He later acquired Films Inc., which distributed non-EB-produced films (including studio films) to the non-theatrical market, from Encyclopaedia Britannica. He created the parent company Public Media, Inc. for the business. Films Inc. later acquired competitor Audio-Brandon. In the 1990s, Public Media Inc. launched the DVD label Home Vision Entertainment. In 2005, Public Media, Inc. was acquired by Image Entertainment. Benton retained ownership of Public Media Education, LLC.

Benton led the Foundation through its evolution from a grantmaking to an operating foundation devoted generally to the field of communications. In 1978, President Carter appointed Charles as chairman of the National Commission on Libraries and Information Science and as chairman of the first White House Conference on Library and Information Services, held in November 1979. In 1980, he was re-appointed for an additional five-year term, during which time he was elected chairman emeritus by unanimous vote of NCLIS commissioners. From the fall of 1997 to December 1998, Charles was a member of the Presidential Advisory Committee on Public Interest Obligations of Digital Television Broadcasters, (Gore Commission). In 2004, Benton and his wife, Marjorie Craig Benton, received the Distinguished Grantmaker Award from the Council on Foundations, for lifetime achievement.

== Personal life and death ==
Benton met Marjorie Craig at Yale who had been a student at Connecticut College for Women. He married Marjorie in 1953. They were together for 62 years until his death. He died April 29, 2015, aged 84, of complications of renal cancer in Evanston, Illinois in his home.
