= Bicentennial of the Encyclopædia Britannica =

200th anniversary of the Encyclopædia Britannica's release

The first two pamphlets ("numbers") of the Encyclopædia Britannica were issued in December 1768, being sold from the printing office of its originator, Colin Macfarquhar, in Nicholson Street in Edinburgh. In 1968, several celebrations of the Britannica's bicentennial were held, and the three volumes of the 1st edition were reprinted in facsimile.

== The Britannica Banquet ==
On 15 October 1968, the Britannica threw a banquet for itself celebrating its 200th birthday. Queen Elizabeth herself was not present, although she sent warm thanks for the gift of a fresh copy of the 14th edition. Hundreds of guests were arranged at 13 tables and served an exceptional dinner with well-chosen wines and tasteful music:

Menu of the Bicentennial Banquet for the Encyclopædia Britannica
Wine	Food
Madeira:Trinity House Bual	Velouté of Cornish Crabs
White Burgundy: Pouilly Fuissé 1964 (Ernest Marples et Cie)	Fillet of Dover Sole in Cheshire Sauce
Bordeaux: Château Talbot St Julien 1959	Quail in Port Wine Aspic Goose Liver Paté Dressed Peas Orange Salad
	Mint Sherbet
Champagne: Charles Heidsieck 1959	Noisette of Southdown Lamb Belle Hélène Baby Marrows in Butter
Port:Taylor's 1955	Pears in Madeira Sauce Hazelnut Ice Cream
Brandy: Crozet V.S.O.P. or Liqueurs	Coffee

During the reception, the music was provided by Pipe Major L. D. V. de Laspee of the London Scottish, by kind permission of Lt. Colonel A. F. Niekirk, TD Officer Commanding. During the banquet itself, music was provided by the String Orchestra of the Royal Artillery Band, as directed by Captain R. Quinn, MBE, LSRM, RA, by kind permission of the Director, Royal Artillery. Later in the banquet, a programme of fanfares was performed by the Guild of Gentlemen Trumpeters. As Sir Gilbert Inglefield, the Lord Mayor of London, put it during his speech, "This, surely, is yet one more memorable episode in our chronicles of time."

Five speakers gave brief speeches at the banquet:

- Dr. Robert Hutchins, Chairman of the Board of Editors for the Britannica
- Sir Gilbert Inglefield, the Lord Mayor of the City of London
- the Right Honorable Harold Wilson, Prime Minister of the United Kingdom
- William Benton, Chairman and publisher of the Britannica
- Sir William Haley, Editor in Chief of the Britannica

Many amusing episodes in the Britannica's history were recounted. Several speakers reiterated the Britannica's commitment to being not merely a reference work (an "enchantingly vast cornucopia of erudition", in Sir Gilbert Inglefield's words), but a great educational instrument of all humanity; in the words of Dr. Hutchins, "the Britannica seems destined to become a world university" and "Senator Benton...will go down in history as one of the most influential educators of our time." Prime Minister Harold Wilson stated that he and Jennie Lee were inspired to begin the Open University by the Britannica's push into international markets, as well as by the Soviet Union's dedicated broadcasting of educational propaganda. Finally, the Britannica's view of itself as the summa of all civilization can be gleaned from its publisher Bill Benton's speech.

...the most important job in the United States after the Presidency of the nation [is] the Presidency of the Britannica...The continuing projection of Western civilization in terms of the Encyclopædia Britannica is a paramount requirement of our time...The Britannica embodies the intellectual tradition of the Western World.

== The Exhibition at the Newberry Library ==
From 9 April 1968 through 31 May 1968, the Newberry Library in Chicago offered an exhibit celebrating all encyclopedias, but most particularly the Britannica. The exhibit was accompanied by a book by James M. Wells, who wrote an overview essay dated 9 January 1968.

== Re-issue of the 1st edition ==
On the occasion of its 200th anniversary, Encyclopædia Britannica Inc. published a facsimile of the 1st edition, even including "age spots" on the paper. This has been periodically reprinted and is still part of Britannica's product line.

== See also ==
- History of the Encyclopædia Britannica
