= Walter Montgomery Jackson =

Walter Montgomery Jackson (1863–1923) was the founder of encyclopedia publisher Grolier, Inc., and he was the partner of Horace Everett Hooper in publishing the 10th edition of the Encyclopædia Britannica and in developing its 11th edition. He split with Hooper in 1908–1909 in a nasty legal fight after failing to wrest control of the Britannica from Hooper, but obtaining the right to publish the Book of Knowledge, a 1912 U.S. adaptation of The Children's Encyclopædia.

== Early life and career ==
Jackson was born in Newton Lower Falls, Massachusetts, and he began to work cleaning the bookshop and offices of Estes and Lauriat in Boston, ten miles from his birthplace. By the age of 22, he was a partner in the firm, overseeing the manufacturing and publishing. He helped expand the distribution of the firm, but quickly became involved in other publishing ventures as part-owner or director.

Jackson founded the Grolier Society, which specialized in making extra-fine editions of classics and rare literature. The Society was named after the Grolier Club, which had been founded in 1884 to advance the arts involved in making books and which was named after a well-known French bibliophile, Jean Grolier de Servières.

After the split with Hooper he acquired the rights to publish the British The Children's Encyclopaedia under the name Book of Knowledge.

The Children's Encyclopedia was a 10-volume compilation of a popular children's journal of the same name founded and edited by Arthur Mee and published by Alfred Harmsworth, Lord Northcliffe. Being an assembly of the journal issues, the encyclopedia was not organized alphabetically, but rather topically; navigation was assisted by an index in the final volume. Jackson secured the American reprint rights in 1910 after resolving some copyright issues with Lord Northcliffe,

Grolier, Inc. subsequently became a large publisher of general encyclopaedias, including Academic American Encyclopedia, and the software Grolier Multimedia Encyclopedia.
