= 10 Eventful Years =

1947 Encyclopædia Britannica compilation

- Subject: 1937–1946
- Genre: Reference encyclopedia
- Publisher: Encyclopædia Britannica
- Publication date: 1947
- Media type: 4 volumes
- Pages: 3450
- OCLC: 1388246
- LC Class: AG5 .T35

10 Eventful Years is the title of the 1947 Encyclopædia Britannica compilation, spanning ten years, 1937 through 1946. The books were commissioned and edited by Walter Yust, the editor of the Encyclopædia Britannica and were partly based on the Encyclopedia's annual Year Book.

It was published by E.B. Inc (based in Chicago, London & Toronto) and the University of Chicago in 1947, and consists of four volumes spanning the whole 10 years and covering topics into the usual A-Z format. The book is a combination of text and black-and-white photographs, with a colour image at the beginning of each book.

== Contents of Volumes 1-2-3-4 ==
- Abbreviations to Conant (Pages 836)
- Concentration Camps to Ley (Pages 862)
- Liberalism to Scrap (Pages 862)
- Sculpture to Zoology (Pages 800 + index of 62 pages)
