= Colin Macfarquhar =

Scottish bookseller and printer (1744/5–1793)

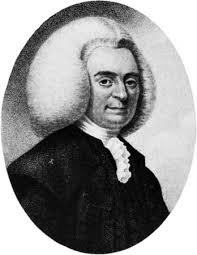
Colin Macfarquhar

Colin Macfarquhar (1744/5 – 2 April 1793) was a Scottish bookseller and printer who is most known for co-founding Encyclopædia Britannica with Andrew Bell, first published in December 1768. The dates of his birth and death remain uncertain, even to Britannica itself.

== Biography ==
Macfarquhar was born in Edinburgh to his father James Macfarquhar who was a wigmaker and his mother Margaret. His formal education ended when he was apprenticed to a printing firm and achieved the status of a master printer in 1767. On 13 December 1767, Macfarquhar married a woman named Jane, whose father, James Scruton, was an accountant in Glasgow. Macfarquhar and Jane had one son and four daughters.

Macfarquhar opened a printing shop in Edinburgh one or two years after getting married. The first edition of Britannica was sold at his printing office in Nicolson Street. Macfarquhar also contributed heavily to the second and third editions of Britannica.
