= Horace Everett Hooper =

American editor (1859–1922)

- Born: December 8, 1859; Worcester, Massachusetts
- Died: June 13, 1922 (aged 62); Bedford Hills, New York
- Known for: Publisher of Encyclopædia Britannica from 1897 to 1922

Horace Everett Hooper (December 8, 1859 – June 13, 1922) was the publisher of Encyclopædia Britannica from 1897 until his death.

== Early life ==
Hooper was born in Worcester, Massachusetts. He quit school at the age of 16, and after gaining experience in various book shops, founded the Western Book and Stationery Company at Denver, Colorado. He sold books in the western states making use of the United States Postal Service.

== Rights to and purchase of Encyclopædia Britannica ==
He relocated to Chicago, Illinois in 1893 to join the company of James Clark, publishers of cheap editions. He marketed their reprint of the Century Dictionary using mail order and credit by installment terms, to great success. He visited England in 1897 and realized that the 9th edition of Encyclopædia Britannica could be marketed in the same manner. He also noted that The Times suffered decreasing sales, and had on the idea of using the latter to market the former — to their mutual benefit.

He secured the reprint rights to Encyclopædia Britannica and The Times reissued it. Within three months 10,000 sets were sold and within five years the total had reached 50,000. Hooper bought the copyright, and began the production of eleven additional volumes to make the 10th edition, which was published by The Times in 1902–3.

The Times appointed Hooper as advertising manager, and in 1905 he initiated the Times Book Club, managed by Janet Hogarth. After the purchase of The Times by Lord Northcliffe, Hooper quit the company in 1908. He began the production of the Encyclopædia Britannica Eleventh Edition which was published 1910–11. This was published in two blocks of volumes instead of the volumes appearing serially during a number of years.

Hooper established the Britannica Year-Book, the first volume being published in 1913. He produced the Handy Volume edition (1915–1916) specifically for mail-order. This was a photographic reprint of the 11th edition, and was often sold with an accompanying book case.

== Sale of Encyclopædia Britannica ==
Hooper sold the copyright to Sears Roebuck in 1920 but supervised for them the publication in 1922 of the 12th edition – three volumes covering the events of World War I with a reprint of the eleventh edition. It too was issued in the Handy Volume format.
