= Editor-in-chief of the Encyclopædia Britannica =

Lead editor of the Britannica

- Inaugural holder: William Smellie
- Formation: 1768

The editor-in-chief of the Encyclopædia Britannica serves as the editorial leader of the Encyclopædia Britannica, a general reference encyclopedia published since 1768. Since 2012, the encyclopedia is published exclusively on the internet, following 244 years of physical editions. The first editor-in-chief of the Britannica was Scotsman William Smellie, and the current holder of the office is J.E. Luebering.

== Background ==
The Encyclopædia Britannica is an English-language general reference encyclopedia, published since 1768. The Britannica was first published in Edinburgh, Scotland, in three volumes, with printer William Smellie serving as its principal editor. By 1988, the encyclopedia grew to consist of 32 volumes in total, but later stopped printing physical copies to focus on the online edition in 2012. As of 2025, the current editor-in-chief of the encyclopedia is Jason Tuohey, who was formerly an editor at Yahoo News.

== Editors-in-chief ==
Portrait	Name (lifespan)	Tenure during publication (Note: As indicated by the period of publication of their respective editions.)	Edition		Notable contribution(s)	Ref.
	William Smellie (1740–1795)	1768–1771	Encyclopædia Britannica First Edition		"Abridgement"	
	James Tytler (1745–1804) (Note: The biographer of Tytler claimed that he edited the first edition also, although it is generally acknowledged that this is not the case.)	1776–1784	Encyclopædia Britannica Second Edition			
—N/a	Colin Macfarquhar (1745?–1793)	1788–1793	Encyclopædia Britannica Third Edition (Note: Macfarquhar died before the edition was finished, leading the remaining volumes to be edited by Gleig.)			
	George Gleig (1753–1840)	1793–1797	Encyclopædia Britannica Third Edition			
	James Millar (1762–1827)	1801–1810	Encyclopædia Britannica Fourth Edition			
—N/a	Thomson Bonar (1739–1814)	1810–1812	Encyclopædia Britannica Fifth Edition (Note: Bonar edited the first five volumes, with the remaining 15 being edited by Millard.)			
	James Millar (1762–1827)	1812–1817	Encyclopædia Britannica Fifth Edition			
	Charles Maclaren (1782–1866)	1820–1823	Encyclopædia Britannica Sixth Edition			
	Macvey Napier (1776–1847)	1830–1842	Encyclopædia Britannica Seventh Edition			
	Thomas Stewart Traill (1781–1862)	1852–1860	Encyclopædia Britannica Eighth Edition			
	Thomas Spencer Baynes (1823–1887)	1875–1887	Encyclopædia Britannica Ninth Edition (Note: Baynes was the sole editor-in-chief of the first 11 volumes of the ninth edition. Due to ill health, he became joint editor of the encyclopedia alongside Smith from 1881, before dying in 1887. Smith saw to the work's completion in 1888.)		"Shakespeare, William"	
	William Robertson Smith (1846–1894)	1881–1888	Encyclopædia Britannica Ninth Edition			
	Hugh Chisholm (1866–1924)	1902–1903	Encyclopædia Britannica Tenth Edition (Note: Chisholm, Hadley, and Wallace all served as joint editors of the tenth edition.)			
	Arthur Twining Hadley (1856–1930)	1902–1903	Encyclopædia Britannica Tenth Edition			
	Donald Mackenzie Wallace (1841–1919)	1902–1903	Encyclopædia Britannica Tenth Edition		"Russia"	
	Hugh Chisholm (1866–1924)	1910–1911	Encyclopædia Britannica Eleventh Edition			
	Hugh Chisholm (1866–1924)	1922	Encyclopædia Britannica Twelfth Edition			
	James Louis Garvin (1868–1947)	1926	Encyclopædia Britannica Thirteenth Edition			
	James Louis Garvin (1868–1947)	1929–1932	Encyclopædia Britannica Fourteenth Edition			
—N/a	Franklin Henry Hooper (1862–1940)	1932–1938	Encyclopædia Britannica Fourteenth Edition			
—N/a	Walter Yust (1894–1960)	1938–1960	Encyclopædia Britannica Fourteenth Edition			
	Harry Scott Ashmore (1916–1998)	1960–1963	Encyclopædia Britannica Fourteenth Edition			
—N/a	Warren Eversleigh Preece (1921–2007)	1965–1967	Encyclopædia Britannica Fourteenth Edition			
	William Haley (1901–1987)	1968–1969	Encyclopædia Britannica Fourteenth Edition			
—N/a	Warren Eversleigh Preece (1921–2007)	1969–1975	Encyclopædia Britannica Fourteenth Edition			
—N/a	Warren Eversleigh Preece (1921–2007)	1969–1975	Encyclopædia Britannica Fifteenth Edition			
—N/a	Philip Whitehead Goetz (1927–2008)	1979–1991	Encyclopædia Britannica Fifteenth Edition			
—N/a	Robert McHenry (born 1945)	1992–1997	Encyclopædia Britannica Fifteenth Edition	Britannica Online		
—N/a	Dale Hoiberg	1997–2015	Encyclopædia Britannica Fifteenth Edition	Britannica Online		
—N/a	Tracy Grant (born 1964)	2022–2025	Britannica Online			
—N/a	Jason Tuohey	2025–current	Britannica Online			
