= Prostitution in Scotland =

Prostitution in Scotland has been similar to that in England under the State of Union, but since devolution, the new Scottish Parliament has pursued its own policies.

In Scotland, prostitution itself (the exchange of sexual services for money) is legal, but associated activities (such as public solicitation, operating a brothel, or other forms of pimping) are criminal offences.

== Tolerance ==
In 1982, the Civic Government (Scotland) Act 1982 came into force. This prohibited soliciting, but also gave local councils the power to license places of entertainment. Edinburgh Council issued licenses to massage parlours and saunas, effectively allowing brothels. The council came under pressure not to renew the licences in 2012, but subsequently did renew them.

In 1985, Lothian and Borders Police negotiated with Edinburgh's prostitutes to form a tolerance zone in Leith's Coburg Street area. In return for the police "turning a blind eye", the prostitutes would stay within this area. Gentrification was happening in the Coburg Street area and in August 2001 the toleration zone was moved to an industrial estate in Salamander Street. Following protests from local residents the toleration zone was closed in November 2001.

Scottish National Party MSP Margo MacDonald introduced the Prostitution Tolerance Zones Bill to the Scottish Parliament in 2002. This would have allowed tolerance zones to be set up. Following an enquiry by an expert group into prostitution, the Bill was withdrawn in November 2005.

Aberdeen set up a tolerance zone in the dock area in 2001. The Prostitution (Public Places) (Scotland) Act 2007 came into force in October 2007. This act criminalised kerb crawling and as result the tolerance zone was closed.

In 2013, the Scottish police forces were merged to form Police Scotland. Previously each local force had had its own policy regarding prostitution. Police Scotland applied one policy to all of Scotland. This resulted in raids on the saunas in June 2013. Many of the saunas were forced to close.

In April 2019, some sex work charities called for lawmakers in Scotland to reject a sex work policy, after statistics showed that violent crime against sex workers almost doubled after it was introduced in Ireland. The increase in Ireland was associated with the introduction of the "Nordic Model", a Swedish law which criminalises people who buy sex, rather than those who sell it. The statistic originated from UglyMugs, an app where sex workers can report incidents of abuse and crime, and receive alerts about dangerous clients.

== Legislative framework ==
Street prostitution is dealt with under the Civic Government (Scotland) Act 1982, section 46(1), which states:

a prostitute (whether male or female) who for the purposes of prostitution -

1. loiters in a public place
2. solicits in a public place or in any other place so as to be seen from a public place or
3. importunes any person in a public place

shall be guilty of an offence

Kerb crawling, soliciting a prostitute for sex in a public place, and loitering for the same purpose are also criminal offences, with a maximum penalty of a £1000 fine, under the Prostitution (Public Places) (Scotland) Act 2007 (in force 15 October 2007), as follows:

1. A person (“A”) who, for the purpose of obtaining the services of a person engaged in prostitution, solicits in a relevant place commits an offence.
2. For the purposes of subsection (1) it is immaterial whether or not—

(a) A is in or on public transport,
(b) A is in a motor vehicle which is not public transport,
(c) a person solicited by A for the purpose mentioned in that subsection is a person engaged in prostitution.

3. A person (“B”) who loiters in a relevant place so that in all the circumstances it may reasonably be inferred that B was doing so for the purpose of obtaining the services of a person engaged in prostitution commits an offence.
4. For the purposes of subsection (3) it is immaterial whether or not—

(a) B is in or on public transport,
(b) B is in a motor vehicle which is not public transport.

5. A person guilty of an offence under subsection (1) or (3) is liable on summary conviction to a fine not exceeding level 3 on the standard scale.
6. In this section— ...

“motor vehicle” has the meaning given by section 185(1) of the Road Traffic Act 1988 (c. 52),
“public transport” means a vehicle, train, tram, ship, hovercraft, aircraft or other thing designed, adapted or used for the carriage of persons provided in connection with any of those services on which members of the public rely for getting from place to place when not relying on facilities of their own,
"relevant place" means—

(a) a public place within the meaning of section 133 of the Civic Government (Scotland) Act 1982 (c. 45),
(b) a place to which at the material time the public are permitted to have access (whether on payment or otherwise),

and in subsection (1) includes a place which is visible from a place mentioned in paragraph (a) or (b).

Operating a brothel is illegal under the Criminal Law (Consolidation) (Scotland) Act 1995, as follows:

11 Trading in prostitution and brothel-keeping.

(5) Any person who—

(a) keeps or manages or acts or assists in the management of a brothel; or
(b) being the tenant, lessee, occupier or person in charge of any premises, knowingly permits such premises or any part thereof to be used as a brothel or for the purposes of habitual prostitution; or
(c) being the lessor or landlord of any premises, or the agent of such lessor or landlord, lets the same or any part thereof with the knowledge that such premises or some part thereof are or is to be used as a brothel, or is willfully a party to the continued use of such premises or any part thereof as a brothel,

shall be guilty of an offence.

Section 13 makes provision about male prostitution. Third-party activities, such as pimping, procuring, and living off the avails, are illegal under section 7 (Procuring) and section 11 of the Act. .

== Previous reforms to prostitution laws ==
An expert group was assembled in 2003, and produced a report in 2004 entitled Being Outside - Constructing a Response to Street Prostitution. The key proposals included replacing soliciting laws with "offensive behaviour or conduct", applicable to both buyer or seller (obviating pressure to criminalise kerb crawling), and "managed areas" in which the activity would take place. They also recommended a national framework to guide local authorities, a requirement for local implementation plans, and public education.

A Prostitution Tolerance Zones Bill was introduced into the Scottish Parliament, but failed to become law. Instead, the Parliament passed the Prostitution (Public Places) (Scotland) Act 2007, which leaves the law relating to prostitutes unchanged, but introduces a new offence committed by their clients.

In April 2010, a plan to criminalise the customers, which had been introduced by Labour politicians, was rejected. A further attempt by Marlyn Glen (Labour) to introduce this (amendment 6) at Stage 3 was also voted down 78: 44 on 30 June 2010.

A further attempt by Trish Godman (Labour) was made in 2011, but fell at dissolution. Yet another attempt was made by Rhoda Grant (Labour) was made in 2013, but was only supported by Labour MSPs, and therefore, did not receive cross-party support.

In September 2015, independent MSP Jean Urquhart lodged a proposal with the Scottish Parliament for a Prostitution Law Reform Bill that would decriminalise sex work in Scotland, in line with the New Zealand model. Jean Urquhart worked closely with SCOT-PEP, a Scottish charity that advocates for the safety, rights, and health of everyone who sells sex in Scotland, in developing the proposals. The proposals included the repeal of soliciting and kerb-crawling laws, changes to brothel-keeping laws to allow up to four sex workers to work collectively from the same indoor premises, and a proposal for larger commercial brothels. The proposed Bill also sought to repeal laws on living on the earnings of sex work, which criminalise family members, friends, and flatmates of sex workers. The consultation period ran for a period of 3 months, and results showed that 70% of the respondents were in favour of the aims of the proposed Bill. An event was held in the Scottish Parliament on Tuesday, 10 November 2015, to present the proposals contained in the Bill with speakers from SCOT-PEP, the New Zealand Prostitutes Collective, the English Collective of Prostitutes, the National Ugly Mugs, the National Union of Students, as well as academics experienced in researching sex work.

== Advocacy for law reform ==
In March 2017, the Scottish National Party backed changes to prostitution laws to criminalise those paying for sex, but not those who sell it. The decision drew criticism from sex workers and sex worker organisations, who said that the full decriminalisation of sex work was the only way to the ensure the safety of sex workers.

The Scottish Greens support the decriminalisation of sex work along with full legal protection from exploitation, trafficking and violence, and access to better support and healthcare for sex workers.

On 20 May 2025, Ash Regan – then the sole MSP in the Alba Party – introduced the Prostitution (Offences and Support) (Scotland) Bill, a bill to implement the Nordic model in Scotland. In response, Scottish sex workers launched a campaign against Regan's bill, saying it would "put them in more danger, pushing the industry underground, increasing stigma, and exposing people to more violence and poverty". Polling of 1,088 Scottish adults by YouGov, carried out in 2024, indicated public opposition to the Nordic model, with 47% saying it should be legal for a person to pay someone to have sex with them, compared to 32% who think it should not be legal. In 2025, the Scottish Left Review stated its opposition to the Nordic model. Protests were held outside the Scottish Parliament by sex workers and their allies against the Nordic Model and Ash Regan's bill. The Scottish Parliament voted against the bill in February 2026.

Campaign groups in Scotland include Scotland For Decrim, which advocates for the decriminalisation of sex work, and A Model for Scotland, which supports the introduction of the Nordic model.

== Miscellanea ==
=== Ranger's Impartial List of the Ladies of Pleasure in Edinburgh ===
Published anonymously in 1775, Ranger's Impartial List of the Ladies of Pleasure in Edinburgh was a review of 66 of Edinburgh's prostitutes. The author was later revealed to be James Tytler, editor of the Encyclopædia Britannica.

A typical entry:

Miss Sutherland, Back of Bell’s Wynd

This Lady is an old veteran in the service, about 30 years of age, middle sized, black hair and complexion and very good teeth, but not altogether good-natured.

She is a firm votary to the wanton Goddess, and would willingly play morning, noon, and night.

As a friend, we will give a caution to this Lady, as she has a habit to make free with a gentleman’s pocket, especially when he is in liquor.

The book was republished in 1978 by Paul Harris.

=== Edinburgh and Glasgow ===
A survey in 1842 found that when the General Assembly met in Edinburgh that the brothels were particularly busy. In 2004 a committee of the Scottish Parliament were debating zones of tolerance for prostitution and Margo MacDonald referred to Blythswood Square in Glasgow as having been in the past a haunt of prostitutes.

== See also ==
- Prostitution in the United Kingdom
- Sex Worker Advocacy and Resistance Movement
- Dora Noyce
