= John Amyatt =

English chemist

John Amyatt FRSE was an English chemist. He was appointed King's Chemist on 24 October 1776 and the office was abolished on 14 November 1782.

Amyatt, described as "a very sensible and agreeable English gentleman", is remembered for one of the most famous quotes from the Scottish Enlightenment. He once observed to William Smellie, the editor of the first edition of the Encyclopædia Britannica, that "Edinburgh enjoyed a noble privilege not possessed by any other city in Europe". When asked what he meant by that, Amyatt replied:

"Here stand I at what is called the Cross of Edinburgh, and can in a few minutes take fifty men of genius by the hand"

The "Cross of Edinburgh" is the Mercat Cross, which was the focus of both commercial and social life in the royal burgh during the 18th century.
