= Sex Worker's Opera =

Multidisciplinary show

Sex Worker's Opera is a London-based multidisciplinary show featuring stories of sex workers from 17 countries. It is written and performed by sex workers and their friends, and was first produced in 2013.

== Development ==
Siobhan Knox and Alex Etchart (from Experimental Experience Theater), the co-directors and facilitators behind the Sex Worker's Opera, created the show with the intention to challenge the common misrepresentation of sex workers as either glamorous or harrowed women in film and opera, such as in La traviata, Madama Butterfly, The Threepenny Opera, Manon, and Lulu. In 2013, as part of a Royal Opera House new writing programme, Etchart first began working on the idea of an opera written and performed by sex workers. The project started with seven months of ground research in 2014, collecting stories from sex workers and consulting with local and global sex worker organisations, including UK organisations, e.g. the Sex Workers Open University, x:talk, English Collective of Prostitutes, and Project X from Singapore and Fundación Margen from Chile. The co-directors reached out to sex workers using escort websites, internet forums, community meetings, email lists to involve them in the production. In May 2014, a group of 20 people came together for three days of workshops, and two days after held their first show at the Courtyard Theatre in Hoxton, London. The initial performance was followed by development workshops at the Arcola Theatre, which resulted in a new show which was two hours long and featured a four-person mini-orchestra.

== Synopsis ==
The show combines musical numbers and storytelling, and includes traditional arias, poetry, hip-hop, spoken word, folk and jazz. The show does not have an overarching plot. Two of the few recurring characters are an anti sex-work, feminist mother and her sex worker daughter, berated for her occupation. The production furthermore explains how current sex work legal frameworks criminalising the clients of sex workers in certain countries, such as Norway, Sweden, and France can stigmatise and expose sex workers to danger. It also reenacts brothel raids by the police in the UK when sex workers were targeted in the name of anti-trafficking actions, some of them exposed by the media, detained and deported from the country.

== Cast ==
The Sex Worker's Opera has a policy that the cast and creative team should be at minimum 50 per cent sex workers, whose personal experiences make up the main body of the show. This multimedia performance also includes more than 50 stories from sex workers across 17 countries, creating a multi-voiced, diverse and rich landscape of the industry; from street-workers in Chile dealing with global south inequality to WebCam models in the USA performing poetry.

== Response ==
In 2016 Siobhan Knox, Rachel Burley, and Charlotte Rose, appeared on This Morning on ITV to promote the opera.

In a 2016 review, Charlotte Beale of The Independent found the production too long, but called the Sex Worker's Opera "one of the most important pieces of theatre you see this year", and says it offers a rare and intimate insight about sex work from a position, the sex workers themselves, which is often ignored or stigmatised.

Jade Jackman from Dazed calls the Sex Worker's Opera "wickedly funny and tongue-in-cheek".

== Financing ==
The 2016 production of The Sex Workers' Opera was financed through crowdfunding on Kickstarter between 20 March 2016 and 25 April 2016 where 300 people raised over £11,000 for the show. Experimental Experience raised £1,000 more than they aimed for.

The financing of the show through Kickstarter allowed the cast and mini-orchestra to rehearse for two weeks, pay for the cast and crew, press, and production costs.

== Productions ==
- 28–29 May 2014, The Courtyard Theatre, London
- 26–29 January 2015, Arcola Theatre, London
- 17–29 May 2016, Pleasance Theatre, London
