= Streetwalking in Scotland During the Mid-20th Century =

Form of sex work in Scotland

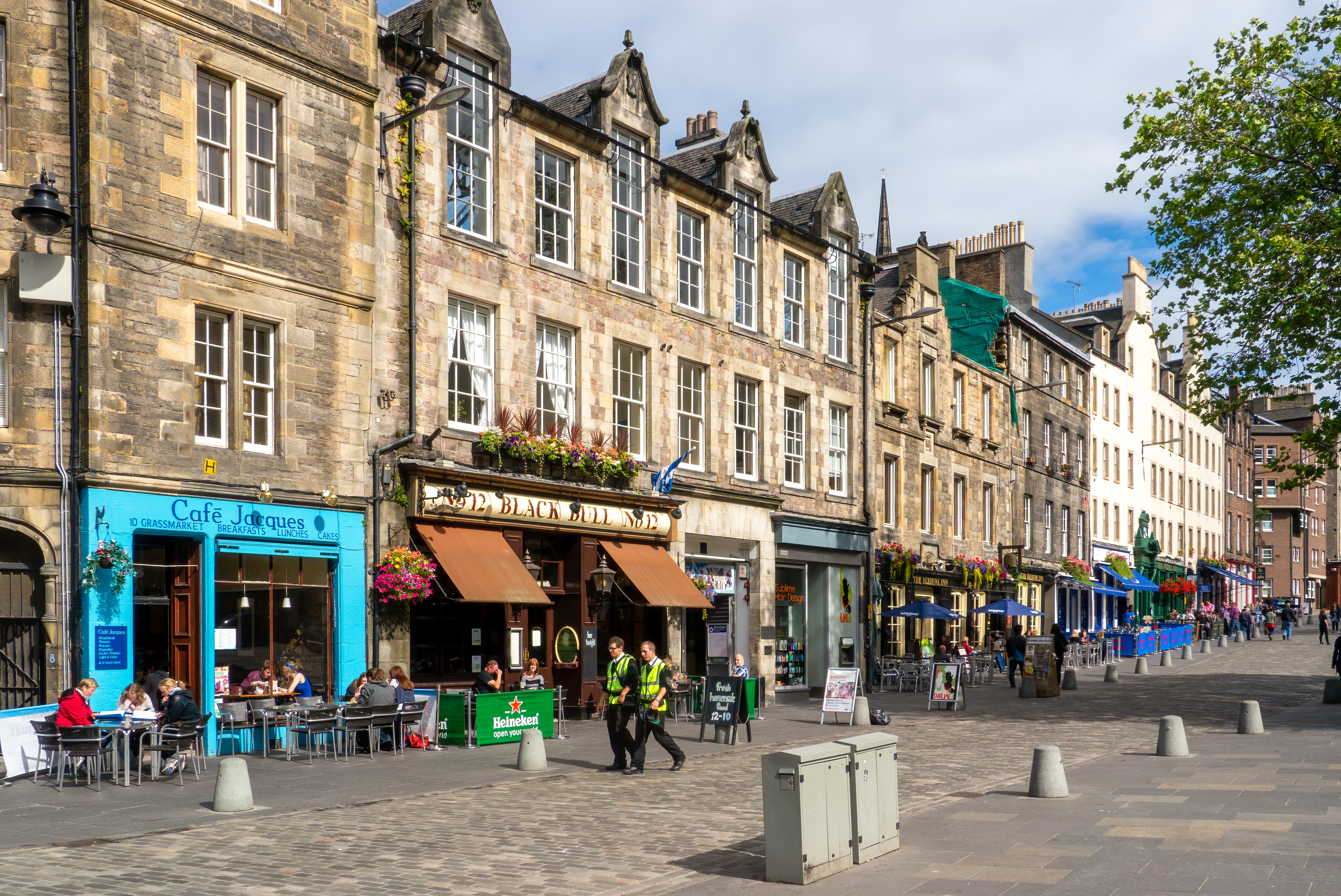
Streetwalkers in Scotland primarily worked around businesses where there would be a steady flow of customers.

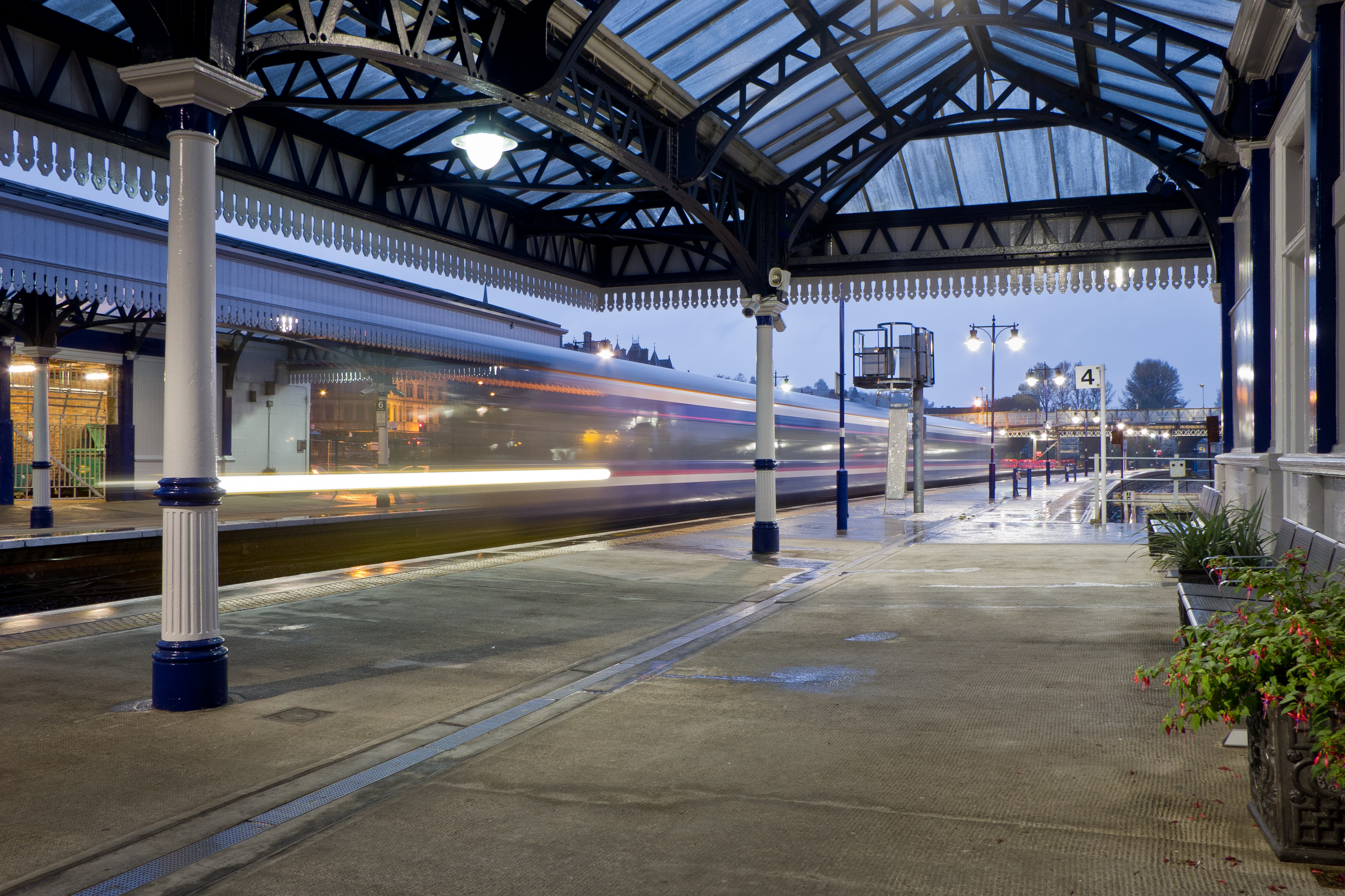
Railway stations were a main source for finding customers for prostitutes in Scotland.

Streetwalking consists of individuals, primarily women, standing on street corners selling sex to passersby. In Scotland, this practice was most prevalent in busy city areas, where there were more potential clients. Specific areas with high numbers of prostitution offenses depended on economic, social, and political circumstances. Scottish laws were against soliciting for the purpose of selling sex, with many warnings and little punishment given. Policies against streetwalking were specific to local districts, with the most severe sanctions given in big cities. Laws regarding prostitution were applied differently towards men and women, which was met with protest. The police, government agencies, and Scottish churches contributed to the public opinion about prostitution, which had a variety of implications for streetwalkers. Advocacy groups became more common towards the end of the twentieth-century following the Women's Suffrage Movement and attacks on sex workers.

== Geography ==
Prostitution during the early twentieth-century was primarily located in Old Town and surrounding Southside areas, which were all part of Edinburgh. Streetwalking eventually shifted towards New Town as the main location. 93 percent of importuning offenses occurred there by 1921, most of which took place in central areas of the district. Police records of offenses may or may not be accurate in determining where prostitution took place most frequently because statistics are sensitive to changes in police strategies. However, it can be concluded that a substantial number of women were engaged in prostitution in these areas.

Central areas of New Town had several commercial advantages for sex workers. They allowed workers to be near the main railway station with large numbers of soldiers, tourists, and others as potential clients. New forms of entertainment also became available nearby around the 1920s, which provided additional opportunities for female prostitutes to solicit men. Further, indoor spaces for rent at a low cost were common in New Town. Streetwalkers could solicit men on the street and take them back to one of these spaces for the sexual exchange. Specific hotspots for streetwalking changed depending on economic developments, public attitudes, and policing strategies.

=== Role of the government ===
==== Laws ====
Prostitution was not illegal in Scotland, but the act of soliciting to sell sex was, based on the Burgh Police (Scotland) Act 1892 which operated into the 1900s. If a woman was suspected of engaging in streetwalking, the police would observe her behavior and she would be given several warnings before being formally charged as a “‘common prostitute’”. The age of consent was raised from 13 to 16 and keeping a brothel was made illegal with the passage of the Criminal Law Amendment Act 1885, also operating throughout the mid-20th century. Licensing Acts were put in place to limit the number of prostitutes working out of hotels and other spaces for rent. Several public places had their own policies against soliciting, which directly affected the ability of prostitutes to operate in those locations.

==== Punishments ====
Courts primarily used fines and imprisonment to punish streetwalking offenses. Imprisonment was used more in Scotland than other neighboring countries and more for street offenses than other types of prostitution. These countries also required soliciting situations to be an annoyance to other people in order to be prosecuted, while this was absent from Scottish law. Under the Criminal Justice (Scotland) Act 1949, common prostitutes were often placed in custody and subjected to medical examinations relating to venereal disease, as policy makers worried about the state's public health.

Punishments were different across the country and depended on rulings of the local governments. In Edinburgh, the offense could be punished with a small fine at a maximum of £10 and a short prison sentence at a maximum of 60 days if the fine was not paid. Outside of large cities, penalties were less severe. The Criminal Justice Administration Act 1914 also gave offenders more time to pay their fines, which helped sex workers avoid jail. The punishments put in place for selling sex had relatively low deterrence.

==== Police ====
The police had little control over prostitution in Scotland. They lacked resources, with a limited number of officers patrolling the streets for many other minor offenses. Police did not take prostitution seriously because it was viewed as a victimless crime. The surveillance required to monitor streetwalking was tedious, so officers were not particularly interested in it. Many were sympathetic towards women selling sex, which may have prevented them from making arrests. They also feared wrongfully arresting innocent women. Motivation for policing prostitution primarily came from the public complaints about the annoyance of women selling sex on the street.

When police did make arrests, they targeted central areas with heavy tourism and business. The Scottish police were also closely associated with government agencies that engaged in “rescue work”. Members of the societies would patrol along with the police in plain clothes to follow-up with women who were cautioned. Police corruption and discrimination was not a large issue in Scotland because court representatives initiated prosecutions, not the police.

=== Role of the public ===
==== Double standards ====
Scottish committee members agreed that pimps, property owners, and others who indirectly benefited from prostitution needed to be held accountable for their involvement. Protests were made against discrimination embedded in Scotland's system for prosecution, arguing that the law should apply to the offense not the offender. Although laws were written for all solicitors of sex, they were mostly applied to women. Many groups advocated for equal application of laws including churches, unions, and committees.

Several features of the Scottish legal system also contributed to the disproportionately high number of female streetwalkers being prosecuted compared to their male counterparts. First, if there was evidence that homosexual behavior was present, if at any point it was no longer considered “active”, charges were dropped. There was also a higher standard of proof for homosexual activity, where two witness testimonies were necessary. Finally, the Lord's Advocacy Department also decided not to prosecute private homosexual acts between two consenting adults for several years during this period. Although Scots did not condone homosexuality, legal constraints prevented them from prosecuting many individuals who were part of the gay community.

==== Scottish churches ====
Scottish churches played a large role in discussion about prostitution. Many Scottish churches advocated for the imprisonment of convicted prostitutes rather than fines. They believed it allowed for self-reflection and the reforming of their morals. Social welfare officers were employed by the Scottish church to guide women who had been cautioned by the police or charged with a soliciting offense. Additionally, they advocated for laws to be applied equally to men and women selling sex. They also called for legal recognition of male demand that was driving the sex industry overall. Despite arguments for solicitation laws to apply to everyone regardless of gender, the Scottish Home Department made no changes to any laws.

==== Advocacy groups ====
In 1928, the Edinburgh National Society for Equal Citizenship, along with other groups, argued against the use of the term “prostitute”. They believed it carried stigma, making it difficult for women who left the industry to escape discrimination. Attacks on sex workers in Scotland, particularly the murder of Sheila Anderson towards the end of the twentieth-century brought even more advocacy groups together. The women's suffrage movement in Scotland was also progressing throughout the early and mid-twentieth century, which mobilized women in support of each other in other areas, such as sex work.
