= Dora Noyce =

Scottish brothel keeper

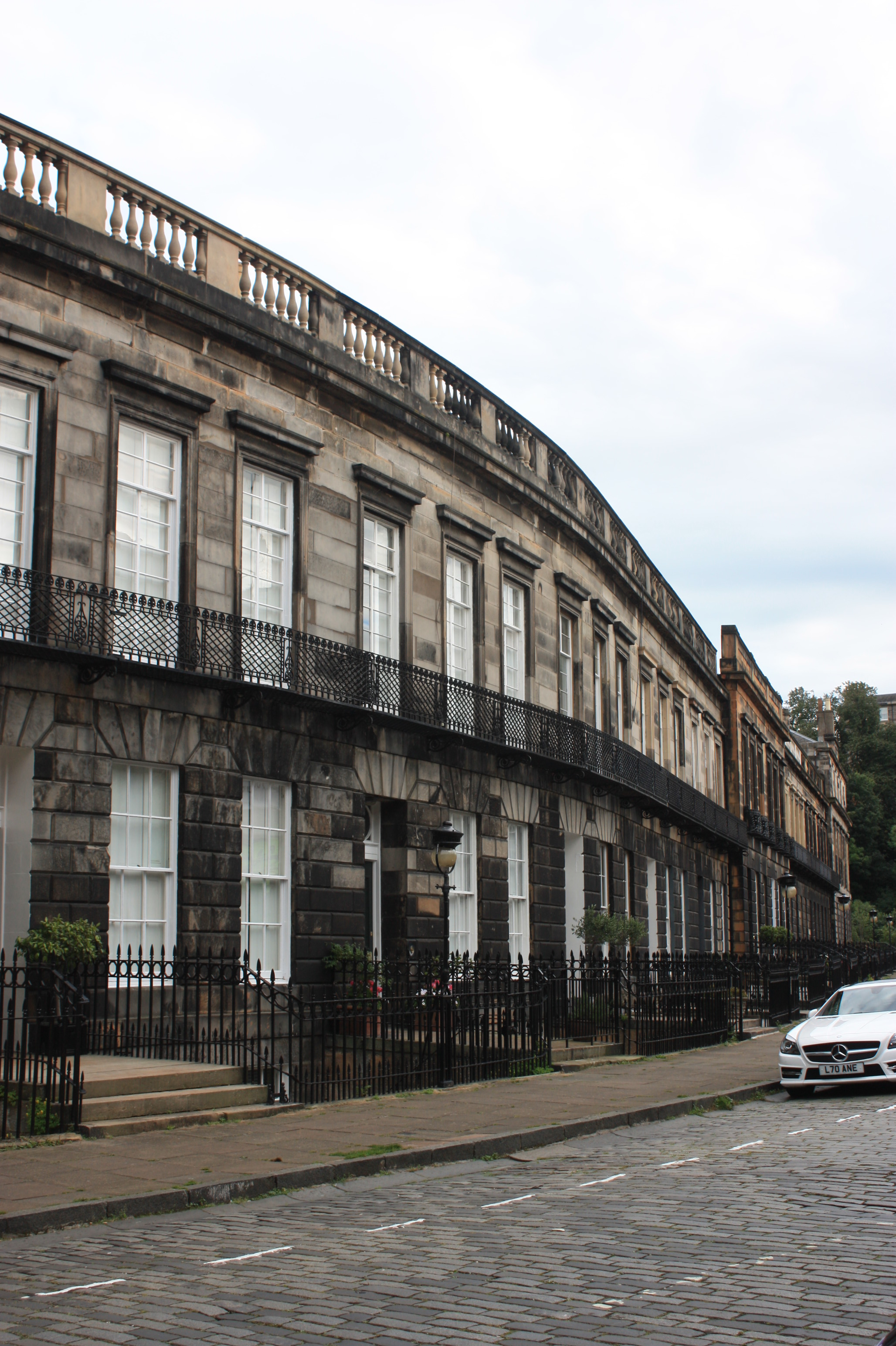
- Danube Street, Stockbridge, Edinburgh where Noyce ran a brothel at no. 17
- Born: Georgie Hunter Rae; 1900; Edinburgh, Scotland
- Died: 1977 (aged 76–77)
- Occupation: Brothel madam

Dora Noyce (born Georgie Hunter Rae, 1900–1977) was a Scottish brothel keeper ("madam") based in Edinburgh.

== Early life ==
Born Georgie Hunter Rae in Rose Street, Edinburgh, the youngest of five, her parents were Alexander Rae, a cutler, and his wife Mary. The poverty of her upbringing led Rae to prostitution and was working in the occupation before she reached her majority, soon adopting the accent of the affluent Morningside district of the city. Although not her first offence, she did not receive her first conviction for living off immoral earnings until 1934. Noyce had a daughter Violet (b. 1923), and took the surname of her child's official father to use as a pseudonym.

== 17 Danube Street ==
Noyce had begun to operate as a madam from premises at 17 Danube Street, Stockbridge, Edinburgh by the end of the second world war and it remained her base until she died. She owned two floors of 17 Danube Street, plus other properties in the city and in Blackpool, although none of these are believed to have been used as brothels.

Overseeing 15 resident prostitutes, Noyce was able to draw on up to 25 other women in busy periods. She could call on a contact in Glasgow and additional women would arrive in taxis. Her employees had regular health checks in line with the Criminal Justice (Scotland) Act 1949 which legislated that "habitual prostitutes" should be checked for sexually transmitted diseases. While she claimed in an interview that demand for her services was greatest during the Edinburgh International Festival, her second busiest period was when the general assembly of the Church of Scotland was in session each May. Queues formed around the block when certain ships were in port. The aircraft carrier USS John F. Kennedy docked at Leith in 1970 leading to her women reportedly attending to £4,000 of business in one night. The ship's captain was forced to declare the house off-limits.

Noyce disliked the description of her premises as a brothel, preferring "a house of leisure and pleasure" or "a YMCA with extras" and once observed: "In my profession there is no such thing as bad publicity, so do make sure you print the correct address in your newspaper". Scottish writer Roddy Martine stumbled into Noyce's establishment in the early 1970s, though remained uninvolved: "I remember it being rather scruffy. There was a big television and girls sitting about on sofas with drunken men. Dora served glasses of dry white wine and asked the suddenly sober stag night revellers if they were sailors". Because of its notoriety, neighbours in the vicinity of Noyce's brothel managed to gain a reduction in their rates because of the impact on the value of local properties.

A Conservative supporter who displayed banners for the party in her windows during elections, Noyce embarrassed her member of parliament by turning up at garden fetes. She also attended Kirk, the services of the Church of Scotland.

== Law and order ==
Known for dressing in a fur coat, twinset and pearls, giving an outwardly respectable image, Noyce was charged 47 times for living off immoral earnings, but generally paid the fine immediately (sometimes up to £250). When charged, according to a former senior Edinburgh policeman, she would only admit to "doing what comes naturally" and "would simply accept it as part of the job". She would pay the fine, keep a low profile for a day or two and then" continue "as if nothing had happened". Other accounts relate that she would converse with the press at Deacon Brodie's pub (in the Royal Mile) after a court appearance.

Pleading guilty to charges relating to running a brothel, she was sentenced to two terms of three months in prison on 31 May 1972, serving for four-months, in what turned out her last period in custody. On her release, she said her sentence "was very stupid of the court. I was just a burden on the ratepayers and, goodness knows, they have enough to put up with already".

She served as a police informer on occasion, which helped to reduce the number of raids, and reportedly had an "arrangement" whereby she would only be raided about twice a year in exchange for information, often about stolen goods. On one official visit, she reputedly asked: "Business or pleasure, gentlemen?" Local councillors commented that they received more complaints when Noyce was in prison because her business was less well managed.

== Death ==
She became one of Edinburgh's characters, well known to locals, who was mourned when she died. A neighbour corresponded to The Scotsman newspaper in a letter published on 26 August 1977: "I confess to having felt something of affection for Dora Noyce. At least she was prepared to accept responsibility for what occurred within and outside of her premises... It may well be that Mrs. Noyce was right when she always claimed that she offered a necessary social service". The establishment finally closed not long after she died.

== See also ==
- Prostitution in Scotland
