= Moore's Dublin Edition =

Moore's Dublin Edition of Encyclopædia Britannica was an Irish printing of Encyclopædia Britannica Third Edition, printed by James Moore of College Green, Dublin. Moore primarily produced and sold reprints of English and Scottish books. Moore's books were technically legal because British copyright protections did not apply in Ireland until after the Acts of Union 1800. Moore advertised the edition as the largest and most expensive publication to date in Ireland. It was published by subscription, with 1,222 subscribers at a price of one Irish guinea per volume.

Like the Edinburgh third edition, Moore's Britannica was published in 18 volumes, containing more than 14,500 total pages and 542 copperplate engravings. The title pages are dated the year they were printed, in volume order from 1788 to 1797, as opposed to those of Britannica, which were all dated 1797. This leads to the curious situation where the pirated version of a work has an earlier date than the original.

Moore's edition is referenced in the 1928 Irish novel Yet Do Not Grieve by Conal O'Riordan. The novel is set in the early nineteenth century, and the protagonist's father was a proud subscriber to Moore's Dublin edition, and the protagonist is frequently instructed to consult it for his edification.
