= Dale Hoiberg =

British sinologist

Dale Hollis Hoiberg is a sinologist and was the editor-in-chief of the Encyclopædia Britannica from 1997 to 2015. He holds a PhD degree in Chinese literature and began to work for Encyclopædia Britannica as an index editor in 1978. In 2010, Hoiberg co-authored a paper with Harvard researchers Jean-Baptiste Michel and Erez Lieberman Aiden entitled "Quantitative Analysis of Culture Using Millions of Digitized Books". The paper was the first to describe the term culturomics.
