= Tracy Grant =

American editor (born 1964)

- Born: 1964 (age 61–62)
- Employers: Encyclopædia Britannica; The Washington Post

Tracy Grant (born 1964) is an American editor who served as the editor-in-chief of the Encyclopædia Britannica from 2022 to 2025, when she was succeeded by Jason Tuohey. She began working for The Washington Post in 1993 as a copy editor in the Financial section and was promoted to managing editor in 2018, the second woman in the history of the newspaper to achieve such a rank. In October 2021, she resigned from the post of managing editor and began writing as a journalist.
