= Budd and Bartram =

Budd and Bartram was a printing firm based in Philadelphia, Pennsylvania, in the late 18th and early 19th centuries.

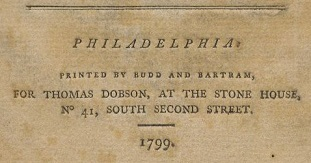
Budd and Bartram example of printing

== History ==
Henry Budd and Archibald Bartram (22 March 1774 – 1808), known as "Budd and Bartram" or "Budd & Bartram", started their printing partnership as early as 1794 to 1803. They printed much work for Thomas Dobson, At The Stone House, No.41, South Second Street, Philadelphia. Budd and Bartram printers were located at 58 N. Second St.

In 1802, John Reynolds "the Printer" (Born 1787 - Died 1853) was an orphaned apprentice in Philadelphia, working for the printer Archibald Bartram, a relative of the Quaker printer Isaac Collins. Later Reynolds, printed and published the Lancaster Journal newspaper for 14 years, beginning in 1820. This newspaper evolved into today's Intelligencer Journal.

== Publications printed by Budd and Bartram ==
- (1794) Medical Inquiries and Observations By Benjamin Rush, M.D. Professor of the Institute of Medicine and of Clinical Practice in The University of Pennsylvania. Volume 1. Second American Edition. Printed by Thomas Dobson, at the Stone-House, No 41, South Second-Street in Philadelphia.
- (1796) The Friend of Youth. Containing Jasper and Emilius, The fickle youth, The peasant, his country's benefactor, The lawsuit, Lost time recovered, Punishment of pride, The increase of family, The humorous engagement, Little Grandison. Published by Budd and Bartram. For Benjamin & Jacob Johnson, no. 147, Market Street. in Philadelphia. 120 pp.
- (1796) An inaugural dissertation on the Causes and Effects of Sleep. Submitted to the Examination of the Rev. John Ewing, S.T.P. Provost, the Trustees and Medical Professors of the University of Pennsylvania, on the Seventeenth Day of May 1796 for the Degree of Doctor of Medicine By Thomas Ball, of Virginia, Member of the Philadelphia Medical Society. Published 1796 by Printed by Budd and Bartram in Philadelphia. 34pp. Written in English.
- (1798) Medical Inquiries and Observations: Containing an Account of the Yellow Fever, as it Appeared in Philadelphia in 1797, and Observations Upon the Nature and Cure of the Gout, and Hydrophobia. By Benjamin Rush, M.D. Professor of Medicine in the University of Pennsylvania. Volume V. Philadelphia: Printed by Budd and Bartram, for Thomas Dobson, at The Stone House, No. 41, South Second Street. 1798.
- (1799) Three Lectures Upon Animal Life. by Benjamin Rush. . Philadelphia: Budd and Bartram.
- (1799) Essay and Notes on Husbandry and Rural Affairs. By J. B. Bordley. Philadelphia: Printed by Budd and Bartram, for Thomas Dobson, at The Stone House, No. 41, South Second Street. 1799.[Copyright Secured According to Law].
- (1799) Observations Upon the Origin of the Malignant Bilious, or Yellow Fever in Philadelphia, and Upon the Means of Preventing It: Addressed to the Citizens of Philadelphia . Philadelphia: Printed by Budd and Bartram, for Thomas Dobson, at The Stone House, No. 41, South Second Street.
- (1799) A Second Address to the Citizens of Philadelphia, Containing Additional Proofs of the Domestic Origin of the Malignant Bilious, or Yellow Fever: To Which are Added, Observations, Intended to Shew [sic] That a Belief in that Opinion, is Calculated to Lessen the Mortality of the Disease, and to Prevent its Recurrence . Philadelphia: Printed by Budd and Bartram for Thomas Dobson.
- (1801) A Compend of Logick By John Andrews, D.D., Vice Provost of University. Philadelphia: Printed by Budd and Bartram, For Thomas Dobson, At The Stone House, No.41, South Second Street. 132 pp.
- (1801) Collection of the Penal Laws of the Commonwealth of Pennsylvania Philadelphia: Pr. by Budd & Bartram, for the use of the Prison. 8vol. 72 pp. The unspecified prison for which Budd & Bartram printed this work was almost certainly the Walnut Street Prison, in operation from 1773 through 1838 and one of the earliest American penitentiaries as well as a groundbreaking experiment in humanitarian incarceration. At the time of this volume’s publication, the prison reform movement was flourishing in Philadelphia.
- (1802) A System of Surgery 2nd ed extracted from the works of Benjamin Bell by Nicholas B. Waters. Printed by Budd & Bartram for Thomas Dobson in Philadelphia. Written in English.
- (1803) A Critical Pronouncing Dictionary, and expositor of the English language to which are prefixed, principles of pronunciation ... Likewise, rules to be observed by the natives of Scotland, Ireland, and London, for avoiding their respective peculiarities, and directions to foreigners, for acquiring a knowledge of the use of this dictionary : the whole interspersed with observations etymological, critical, and grammatical, 1st American ed by John Walker. Printed by Budd and Bartram for H. & P. Rice in Philadelphia .
- (1803) The Journal of Andrew Ellicott, late commissioner on behalf of the United States during part of the year 1796, the years 1797, 1798, 1799, and part of the year 1800: for determining the boundary between the United States and the possessions of His Catholic Majesty in America.... Philadelphia: Printed by Budd & Bartram, for T. Dobson. 1803.
