= Walter Yust =

American journalist and writer

- Born: May 16, 1894; Philadelphia, Pennsylvania
- Died: February 29, 1960 (aged 65); Evanston, Illinois
- Education: University of Pennsylvania
- Occupations: Journalist, writer
- Known for: Editor-in-chief of the Encyclopædia Britannica from 1938 to 1960

Walter M. Yust (May 16, 1894 – February 29, 1960) was an American journalist and writer. Yust was the American editor-in-chief of the Encyclopædia Britannica from 1938 to 1960.

== Early life ==
Yust was a graduate of the University of Pennsylvania.

== Career ==
Yust began his career as a writer for the Philadelphia Evening Ledger in 1917 and later worked for newspapers in New Orleans, Louisiana, and for other publications. Yust became literary editor of the Philadelphia Public Ledger in 1926. Three years later, upon writing a review of the new 14th edition of the Encyclopædia Britannica, Yust came to the attention of its president, William Cox. The following year Yust began to work for the encyclopaedia and became its associate editor in 1932. He served as editor in chief from 1938 until his retirement in 1960.

== Personal life ==
He was the father of Jane Yust Rivera and filmmaker Larry Yust, who made a 20-minute film, in 1969, for Encyclopædia Britannica Films, of Shirley Jackson's "The Lottery", later, Trick Baby (1972), and Homebodies (1974).

Yust died in Evanston, Illinois, at the age of 65 after suffering a heart attack.

== Works ==
- Yust, Walter, ed. (1949). Encyclopædia Britannica: a new survey of universal knowledge. Vol. 9. Encyclopædia Britannica. ISBN 9712345386.
