= James Tytler =

Scottish apothecary and editor

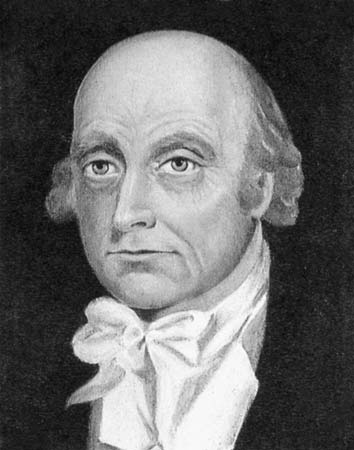
James Tytler

James Tytler (17 December 1745 – 11 January 1804) was a Scottish apothecary and the editor of the second edition of Encyclopædia Britannica. Tytler became the first person in Britain to fly by ascending in a hot air balloon (1784).

A group of historiographers wrote about him:

A social outcast, Tytler did much hack work for low pay and rarely if ever emerged from poverty. But ... he deserves to be remembered as a man of many talents – as a political and religious controversialist, scholar, journalist, poet, song writer, musician, balloonist, pharmacist, surgeon and printer. In addition ... he was an outstanding encyclopedist whose editorship of the second edition earns him a notable place in the history of encyclopedias.

— Hardesty Doig, Kafker, Loveland, Trinkle, 2009

== Life ==
Tytler was born in Fern, Forfarshire, Scotland, the son of a Presbyterian minister. His father taught him Greek, Latin and theology. He probably studied for the ministry but was not interested in (Orthodox) Calvinism. He became a preacher in the Church of Scotland and studied medicine at the University of Edinburgh, after which he was apprenticed to a ship's surgeon for one year. He may not have been awarded a degree, although the 11th edition of Britannica refers to him as James Tytler, M.A. He declined to practise medicine but instead opened a pharmacy in Leith, near Edinburgh, which was a financial failure, leaving him in debt. The two longest articles in the second edition of Britannica are Surgery and Pharmacy, reflecting his fields of expertise.

In 1765, Tytler married Elizabeth Rattray, the orphaned daughter of a solicitor. Soon after, he fled Scotland to escape his creditors. His financial problems may have come from his alcoholism. He went to northern England, where he again tried to make a living as an apothecary. After fathering several children there, he returned to Edinburgh in 1772 or 1773. In 1774 or 1775 Tytler separated from his wife; at the time the couple had five children.

Under the pseudonym "Ranger" Tytler published Ranger's Impartial List of the Ladies of Pleasure in Edinburgh a private book detailing 66 sex workers in the city.

The years when Tytler worked as editor of the Encyclopædia Britannica (1777–1784 for the second edition, and 1788–1793 for the third) were his most lucrative. He also earned income from editing other works and translations, while renting a room for himself and his family at Duddingston. In March 1785 he became bankrupt again, possibly due to the costs of his engaging in hot air ballooning. He moved between several locations in Scotland and northern England. Elizabeth Rattray sued him for divorce in 1788, because he had lived with Jean Aitkenhead since about 1779 and had twin daughters with her.

He returned to Edinburgh in 1791. In 1793 he was charged with sedition for publishing a pamphlet championing the Rights of Man, but fled Scotland prior to his trial, travelling first to Belfast, and then in 1795 to the United States. He was outlawed in absentia. In Salem, Massachusetts, he edited the Salem Register, published some works and sold medicine. On 9 January 1804, Tytler left his house drunk; two days later the sea returned his body.

James and Elizabeth Rattray were members of the Glasites, a radical Protestant sect. In the 1770s, Tytler left the sect and denounced it together with all churches. He remained a fervent Christian without denomination. In Salem he never went to church.

== Encyclopædia Britannica ==
Tytler had previously written more than edited; for example, in 1774 he was the author of two religious pamphlets that earned him little or no money. He came late to the Encyclopædia Britannica, as editor of the second edition (1777–1784). He was paid less than his predecessor, William Smellie, and it is possible he was engaged because one of the Britannica's publishers, Andrew Bell, had been assisted by Tytler on another work. As a group of historiographers wrote, 'Tytler displayed an uncharacteristic steadiness of purpose while working on the second edition.' Reviews of the second edition were lukewarm, but the sales showed an appreciation by the reading public.

Tytler contributed some long treatises to the third edition (1788–1797), and may have been its first editor before he left Edinburgh in March 1788, the month before the first number was published. This left the editor's chair to Britannica's co-owner and Bell's partner, Colin Macfarquhar. Tytler continued to contribute heavily to the third edition when he came back to Edinburgh, up to the letter M, which was produced in 1792 or 1793.

== Politics ==
The second edition of the Encyclopædia Britannica is politically moderate because Bell and Macfarquhar curbed Tytler's reformism. Tytler expressed sympathy for the French Revolution of 1789 and called on the British not to pay taxes. He also denounced public officials. One of his pamphlets, published in 1792, described the House of Commons as a 'vile junto of aristocrats' usurping the rights of king and people. Not money, but honest and upright behaviour should qualify a man for being an elector. As a consequence Tytler was outlawed for sedition in January 1793.

On the ship to America in 1795 Tytler wrote a pamphlet Rising the sun in the west, or the Origin and progress of liberty, in which he denounced the elites of the Old World. Disappointed with the Scottish and Irish, he praised the Americans and the French for fighting against superstition and tyranny (despite the suppression of religion in revolutionary France).

== Aviation ==
The inventive Tytler rivalled the French pioneers of hot air ballooning and was the first person in Britain to ascend in a balloon, almost a month before his rival to the title, Vincenzo Lunardi, made a hydrogen balloon ascent in London. Tytler's venture was expensive, but succeeded after several attempts on 25 August 1784, in Edinburgh. His balloon rose a few feet from the ground. Two days later he managed to reach a height of not more than 300 feet, travelling for half a mile between Green House on the northern edge of what is now Holyrood Park to the nearby village of Restalrig. Later trials were less fortunate. In October his balloon only took off after Tytler left the basket, to the disappointment of the crowd. Having previously been 'the toast of Edinburgh', he was ridiculed and called a coward. His last flight was on 26 July 1785.

Tytler was overshadowed by Lunardi—the self-styled "Daredevil Aeronaut"—who carried out five sensational flights in Scotland, creating a ballooning fad and inspiring ladies' fashions in skirts and hats. The "Lunardi bonnet" is mentioned in the poem To a Louse by Robert Burns.

== See also ==
- History of the Encyclopædia Britannica
