= William Smellie (encyclopedist) =

Scottish printer and encyclopaedist (1740–1795)

William Smellie FRSE, FSA Scot
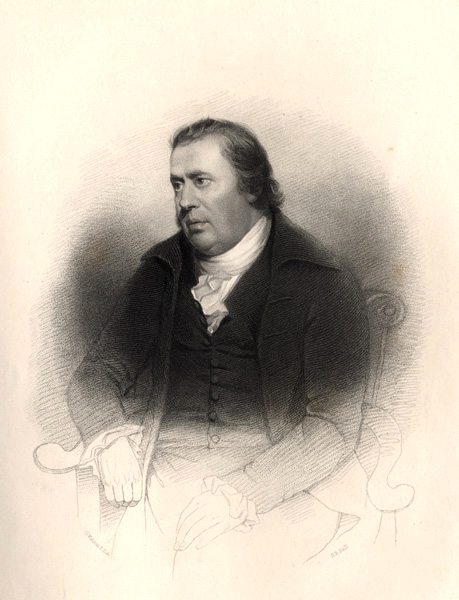
- Smellie, by Henry Bryan Hall
- Born: 1740; The Pleasance, Edinburgh
- Died: June 24, 1795 (aged 54–55); Edinburgh, Scotland, Great Britain
- Resting place: Greyfriars Kirkyard, Edinburgh; 55°56′48″N 3°11′32″W
- Education: Duddingston parish school High School, Edinburgh
- Alma mater: University of Edinburgh
- Occupations: Printer, editor, naturalist, antiquary
- Employer(s): Apprentice, Hamilton, Balfour & Neil, printers, 1752 Substitute lecturer, botany, University of Edinburgh; Founded Balfour & Smellie, printers, Edinburgh, 1765; Edited 1st edition of the Encyclopædia Britannica, 1771- Editor, Edinburgh Magazine and Review, 1773-1776 Partner with William Creech, 1782-
- Known for: Editor of the Encyclopædia Britannica First Edition
- Spouse: Jean Robertson (m. 1763)
- Parent(s): Alexander Smellie, architect, Edinburgh

Notes
- Member of the Edinburgh Philosophical Society, thereby becoming a founding fellow of the Royal Society of Edinburgh upon the Philosophical Society receiving its royal charter in 1783; Founder of the Newtonian Club (1760)

William Smellie (1740 – June 24, 1795) was a Scottish printer who edited the first edition of the Encyclopædia Britannica. He was also a naturalist and antiquary. He was a joint founder of the Royal Society of Edinburgh, co-founder of the Society of Antiquaries of Scotland, and a friend of Robert Burns.

== Early life ==
He was born in The Pleasance, in south-east Edinburgh in 1740, the son of Jean Robertson and Alexander Smellie, architect and master builder. He was educated at Duddingston School then Edinburgh High School.

Smellie left school at the age of 12 to become an apprentice as a printer with Hamilton, Balfour & Neill in 1752. During this time he was promoted to the subeditorial position corrector of the press, and won his employers the Edinburgh Philosophical Society's prize for the most accurately printed edition of a Latin text.

On completion of his apprenticeship he joined the firm of Murray & Cochran as a corrector for the Scots Magazine. He spent three hours per day in the evenings studying at extramural classes at the University of Edinburgh. In 1760 he founded the Newtonian Club, a sub-section of the Edinburgh Philosophical Society. He was also a joint founder of the Royal Society of Edinburgh.

On 27 March 1763 he married Jean Robertson in London.

In 1765 he was awarded a gold medal for his dissertation on the sexes of plants, which contradicted the theories of the Swedish botanist Carolus Linnaeus.

== Encyclopædia Britannica ==
At the age of 28, Smellie was hired by Colin Macfarquhar and Andrew Bell to edit the first edition of the Encyclopædia Britannica, which appeared in 100 weekly instalments ("numbers") from December 1768 to 1771 (reissued together in 1771 in 3 volumes). It was a masterful composition although, by Smellie's own admission, he borrowed liberally from many authors of his day, such as Voltaire, Benjamin Franklin, Alexander Pope and Samuel Johnson. Nevertheless, the first edition of the Britannica contained gross inaccuracies and fanciful speculations; for example, it states that excess use of tobacco could cause neurodegeneration, "drying up the brain to a little black lump consisting of mere membranes".

Smellie strove to make Britannica as usable as possible, saying that "utility ought to be the principal intention of every publication. Wherever this intention does not plainly appear, neither the books nor their authors have the smallest claim to the approbation of mankind".

Smellie entertained strong opinions; for example, he defines farriery as "the art of curing the diseases of horses. The practice of this useful art has been hitherto almost entirely confined to a set of men who are totally ignorant of anatomy, and the general principles of medicine."

Although possessed of wide knowledge, Smellie was not an expert in all matters; for example, his article on "Woman" has but four words: "the female of man." Despite its incompleteness and inaccuracies, Smellie's vivid prose and the easy navigation of the first edition led to strong demand for a second; some prurient engravings by Andrew Bell (later censored by King George III) may also have contributed to the success of the first edition.

Smellie did not participate in the second edition of the Britannica, because he objected to the inclusion of biographical articles in an encyclopedia dedicated to the arts and sciences.

== Later work and death ==
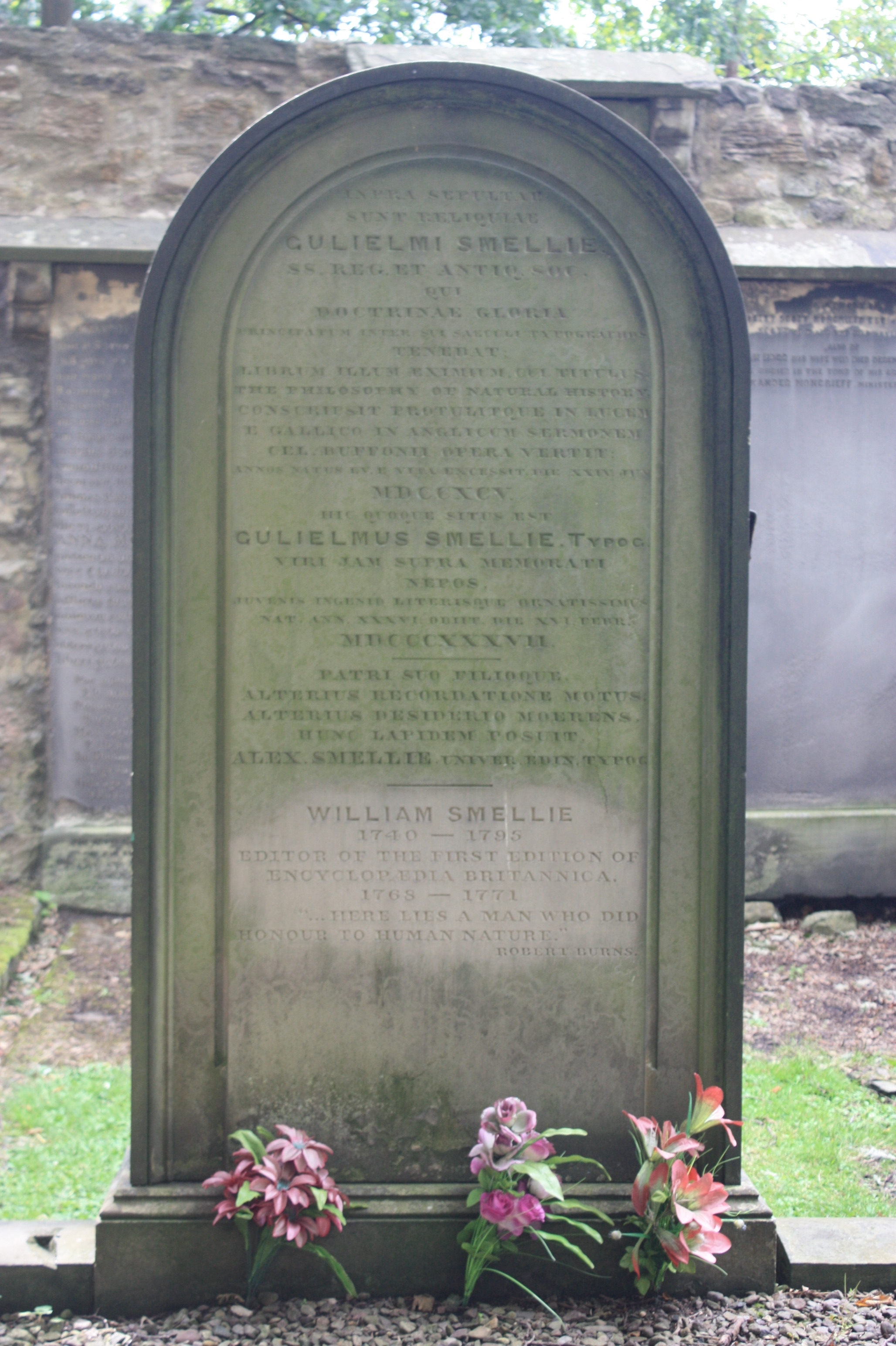
William Smellie's grave, Greyfriars Kirkyard

At the time of his hiring, Smellie edited a weekly called the Scots Journal, which made him familiar with the editing and publication of a work in parts. He went on to print and edit the Edinburgh Weekly Journal as joint owner with William Auld, and was co-owner, editor, and contributor to the Edinburgh Magazine and Review. He printed and edited Domestic Medicine: or, a Treatise on the Prevention and Cure of Diseases by Regimen and Simple Medicines by William Buchan in 1769. He also edited the first transactions of the Society of Antiquaries of Scotland, which were published in 1792.

Smellie is also noted for his English translation of the famous Histoire Naturelle of the French naturalist Georges-Louis Leclerc, Comte de Buffon.

In 1779, Smellie was nominated to be the University of Edinburgh's professor of natural history; however, the post was awarded to Dr John Walker, allegedly due to politics.

In 1781 Smellie was made keeper and superintendent of the Edinburgh Museum of Natural History.

From 1782 he had William Creech as his business partner.

Smellie continued to publish a wide variety of works, including his two-volume Philosophy of Natural History, which became a set text at Harvard University in the 19th century, and at least two of the four-volume set of Thesaurus medicus: sive, disputationum, in Academia Edinensi, ad rem medicam pertinentium, a collegio instituto ad hoc usque tempus, delectu which reprinted Edinburgh medical theses of the 18th century.

In his Philosophy of Natural History he described the struggle for existence. He has been described as a "precursor of Darwin".

His printing office stood at the foot of Anchor Close off the Royal Mile (on a site now on East Market Street) and his house was on Gosford's Close nearby. Gosford's Close was pulled down when the city built George IV Bridge in 1830.

He died in Edinburgh on 24 June 1795 and is buried in Greyfriars Kirkyard just north of the Adam Mausoleum, south-west of the church.

He was well-acquainted with Robert Burns. Burns' assessment is engraved on Smellie's tombstone: "Here lies a man who did honour to human nature". Burns also described him fondly in a letter as "that old Veteran in Genius, Wit and Bawdry".

Papers from Smellie's archive, including his correspondence and manuscripts, are held by the Library of the National Museum of Scotland.

== See also ==
- John Amyatt – English chemist
- Encyclopædia Britannica – General-knowledge encyclopaedia
