= Ranger's Impartial List of Ladies of Pleasure =

1775 list of sex workers in Edinburgh

Ranger's Impartial List of Ladies of Pleasure was a detailed list of sex workers in Edinburgh, published in 1775. The List was anonymously published, but has since been attributed to James Tytler, editor of the second edition of Encyclopædia Britannica.

== The List's contents ==
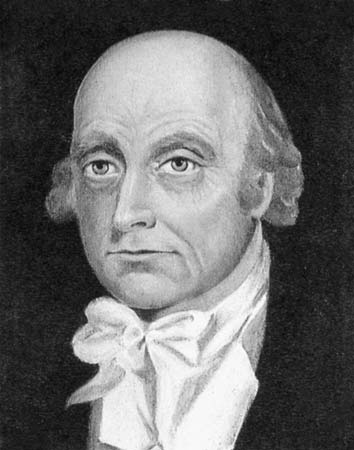
James Tytler, author of the Ranger's List.

The List begins with a preface, arguing against the condemnation of prostitution by citing various Edinburgh lawyers and priests who support the trade. Tytler goes on to detail the names and descriptions of 66 sex workers in Edinburgh, including information of where to find them. This included the brothels they worked at, although some of the sex workers included in the List lived on their own. These workers were some of the 800 that lived in Edinburgh at the time, with around 200 brothels catering to a population of 160,000.

Tytler used colourful and graphic language to describe the workers, including terms like "nymph", "goddess" and "worshipper". The List was published to a private, exclusive audience and was the first of its kind in Edinburgh, similar to Harris's List of Covent Garden Ladies in London. A fold-out map of Edinburgh showing the locations of each brothel mentioned was later included in the 1978 re-published version by Paul Harris.

== Descriptions of the women ==
The List describes some of the women as married or betrothed, with a description of Miss Anderson stating "We are happy to hear she's soon to leave her profession for the honourable state of matrimony".

"Miss M'Culloch, at Mrs Young's

This lady is about 20 years of age, light hair, very pretty eyes, good teeth, and remarkable good skin. If she had a smaller mouth we would take upon us to pronounce her a real beauty. She is extremely loving, and gives great satisfaction in the critical minute, as all those declare who have had the pleasure of her embraces. She has got fine tempting legs, which she is not a little fond of showing, as she appears very often in men's clothes."

— James Tytler, Ranger's Impartial List of Ladies of Pleasure

Three of the sex workers in the List were women of colour, described as having a "black complexion". Two of the ladies worked at a brothel owned by Mrs Young, and potentially catered to LGBTQ+ clientele, with Miss M'Culloch said to appear in men's clothes and Miss Gray known by the alias Henry.
