= Sex Worker Advocacy and Resistance Movement =

British sex worker advocacy group

The Sex Worker Advocacy and Resistance Movement (SWARM), formerly known as the Sex Worker Open University (SWOU), was founded in 2009 to provide educational and other resources to sex workers in the United Kingdom. It is a sex worker-led organisation. Their activities include educational projects, breakfast drop-ins for sex workers, and Glasgow's sex worker support effort, Confide. In April 2013, SWOU took a lead role in halting the further criminalisation of sex work in Scotland by organising a massive grassroots community response which included street protests, public education, sex worker-only workshops on safety, the law, and fighting stigma, and presentations to packed audiences of evidence as to the effects of criminalisation, from sex workers and academics from around the world.

In 2019 the group celebrated a decade of organising by holding a festival where they started the Decriminalised Futures project. The aims of the project are to "highlight the history of the sex workers’ rights movement and its connections to broader social and labour struggles while celebrating creative expression". In 2022 the Institute of Contemporary Arts in London sponsored the project and hosted an exhibition of the same name. The exhibition ran from February to May 2022 and brought together 13 artists, 6 writers including Mercedes Eng, sex workers, the East London Strippers Collective, artists and activists.

== See also ==
- Prostitution in Scotland
- Prostitution in the United Kingdom
