= First edition of the Encyclopædia Britannica =

18th-century reference work

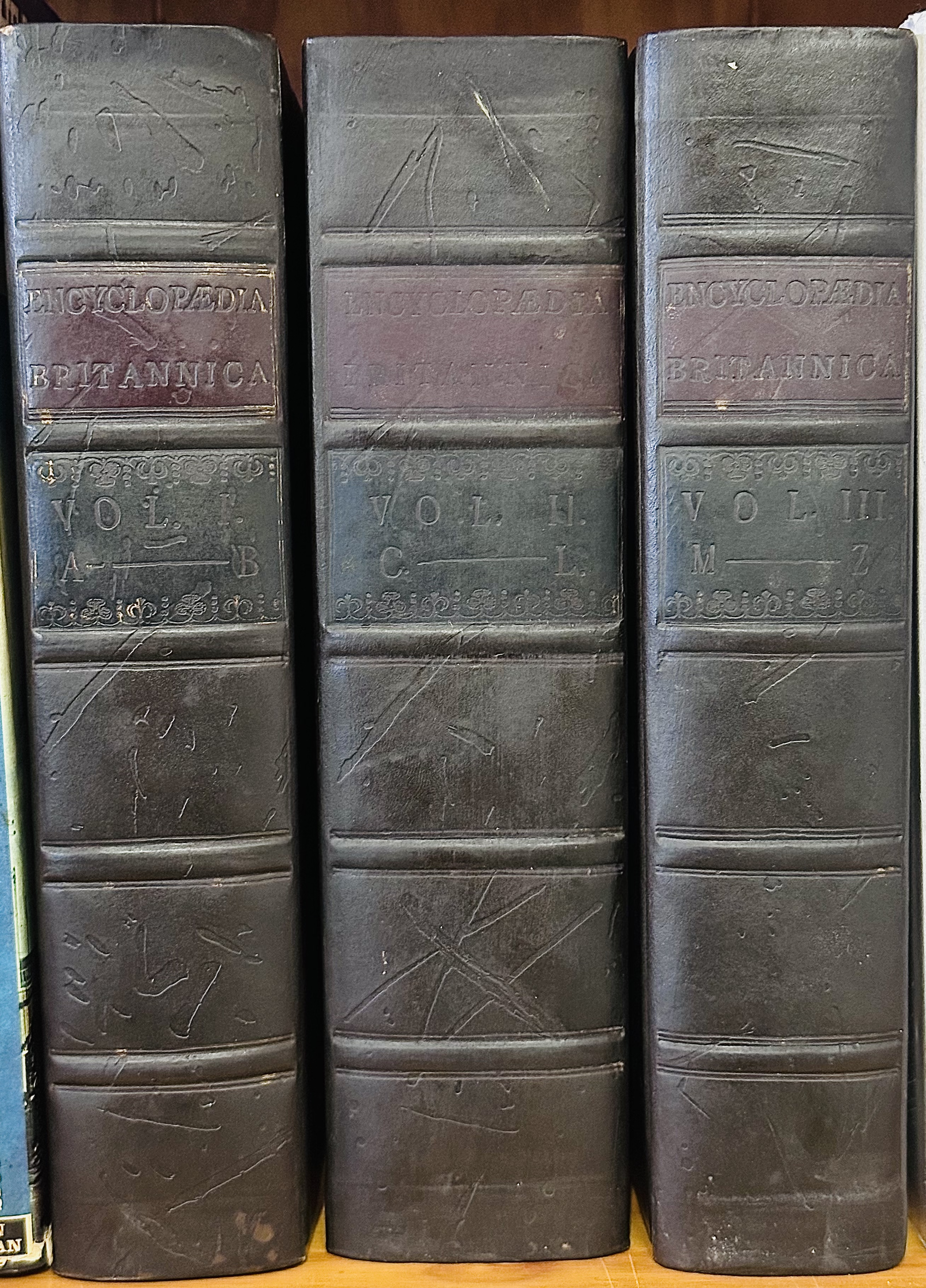
Encyclopædia Britannica, first edition facsimile, 1971

The first edition of the Encyclopædia Britannica (1768–1771) was a work of reference published in three volumes in quarto. It was founded by Colin Macfarquhar and Andrew Bell, in Edinburgh, Scotland, and was initially sold unbound in installments over the course of three years. Almost all of the articles were compiled by William Smellie, while Macfarquhar handled printing and Bell the copperplates.

== Publication history ==
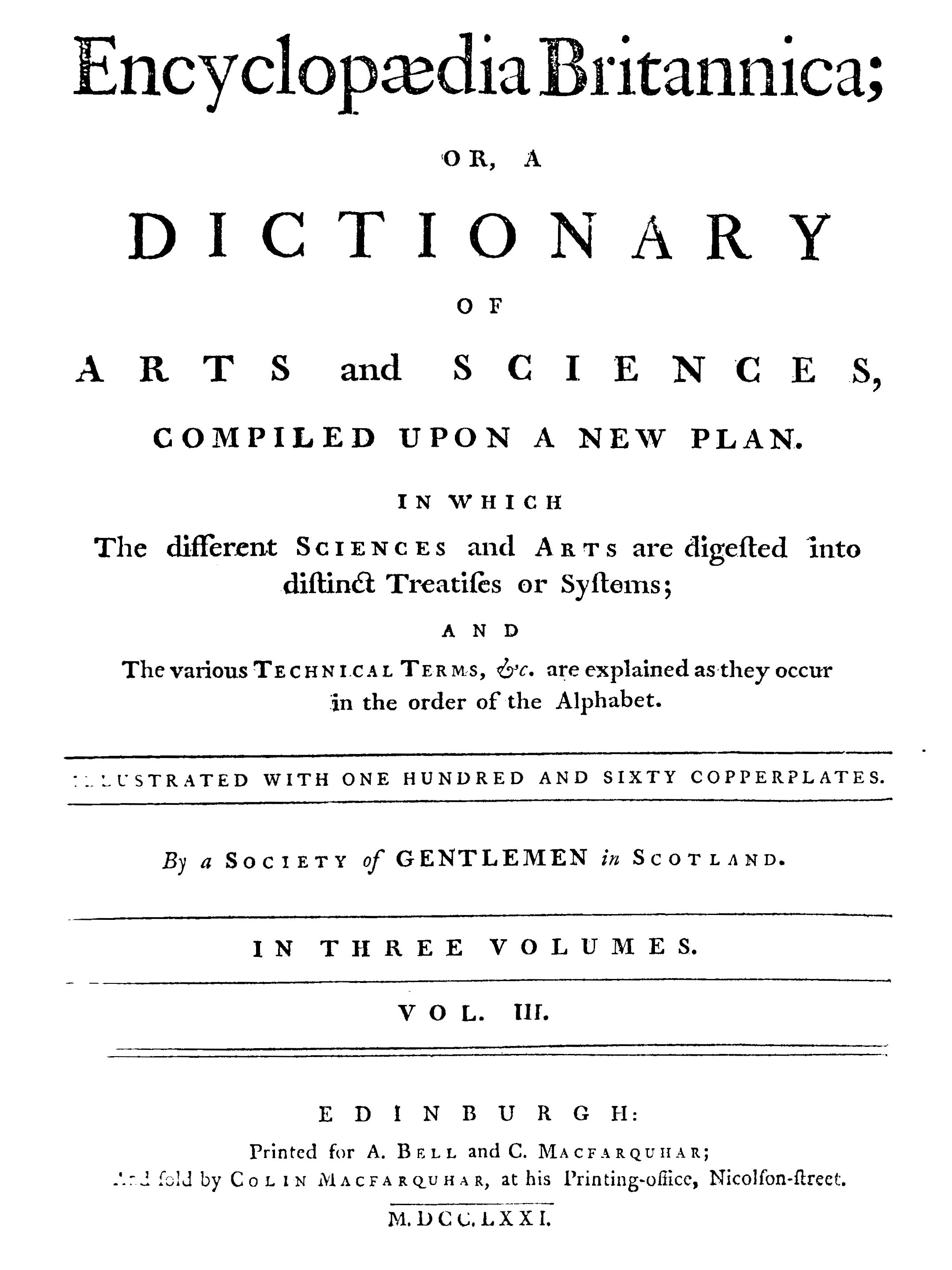
Title page from the first edition

The idea of publishing the Encyclopaedia Britannica came from Colin Macfarquhar, a bookseller and printer, and possibly Andrew Bell, an engraver, both of Edinburgh. Although re-editions of Ephraim Chambers' Cyclopaedia (1728) were still popular, and despite the appearance of several new general encyclopedias on the English market since the 1740s, Macfarquhar and Bell thought the time ripe for a new encyclopedia.

According to its title page, the first edition of the Britannica was "By a SOCIETY of GENTLEMEN in SCOTLAND." Previous encyclopedias as well had been ascribed to societies of gentlemen, presumably to glorify a situation in which an unprestigious compiler toiled nearly alone. Such, in fact, was the case of the first edition of the Britannica. Needing an editor who would work inexpensively, the two chose a twenty-eight-year-old printer and scholar named William Smellie, who was "always hard-pressed for cash." Smellie accepted their offer of 200 pounds sterling to prepare the whole encyclopedia, including articles on "fifteen capital sciences." It is known that he had minor help from one contributor, James Anderson, who wrote the articles "Dictionary, "Pneumatics", and "Smoke", and it is possible that he had a few others. For the most part, however, he worked alone.

Like the Cyclopaedia and other contemporary encyclopedias, the first edition of the Britannica was published serially. The weekly installments (often called "numbers" and equivalent to thick pamphlets), were later bound into three volumes. The installments were priced at 6 pence on normal paper or 8 pence on better paper. They appeared from December 1768 to around August 1771. Once assembled as a three-volume set in 1771, the first edition had 2,391 pages and cost 2 pounds, 10 shillings on normal paper. It went on to be reprinted in London in 1773 and 1775, selling at least 3,000 sets and probably a few thousand more.

== Essay-style and organizational plan ==
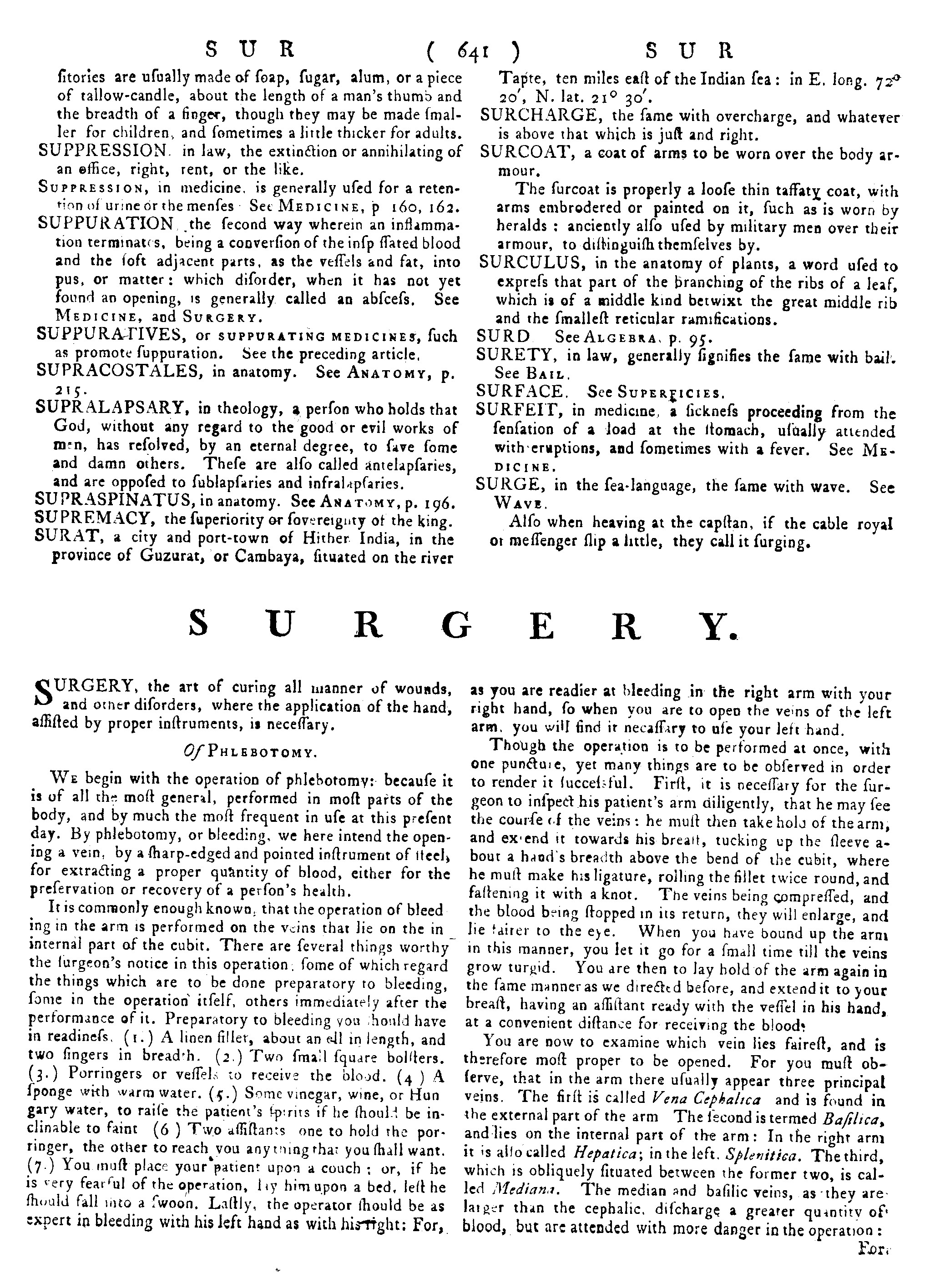
A page from the first edition. The flow of short entries is interrupted here by one of the major treatises.

Organizationally, the first edition of the Encyclopaedia Britannica was different from any previous encyclopedia. What set it apart was the practice of including two kinds of typographically distinct entries, shorter "articles", and longer "treatises" in a single alphabetical sequence. This was the "new plan" that the Britannica boasted about in its subtitle. In principle, treatises were to cover the arts and sciences, leaving articles to deal with their subordinate objects. Most previous dictionaries of the arts and sciences, the Cyclopaedia included, had limited themselves to short entries, and while John Harris"s Lexicon Technicum (1704) had proposed "treatises" on a few topics, he had not distinguished them typographically or used them systematically. Such approaches to encyclopedia-making were derided as "dismembering the Sciences" in the anonymous preface to the first edition of the Britannica:

Whoever has had occasion to consult Chambers, Owen, &c. or even the voluminous French Encyclopedie, will have discovered the folly of attempting to communicate science under the various technical terms arranged in an alphabetical order. Such an attempt is repugnant to the very idea of science, which is a connected series of conclusions.

The idea of including treatises in an encyclopedia may have been inspired by Dennis de Coetlogon's Universal History of Arts and Sciences (1745), an alphabetical encyclopedia that contained only treatises. There is some evidence that Smellie, rather than Bell or Macfarquhar, came up with the idea of combining Coetlogon's treatises with traditional articles. Regardless, the Britannica continued to intermix formally distinguished articles and treatises through the 10th edition.

If one point of the treatises in the first edition of the Britannica was to avoid "dismembering" disciplines, another was to allow for self-instruction. On this score, the anonymous preface made a bold claim:

[W]here is the man who can learn the principles of any science from a Dictionary compiled upon the plan hitherto adopted? We will, however, venture to affirm, that any man of ordinary parts, may, if he chuses, learn the principles of Agriculture, of Astronomy, of Botany, of Chemistry, &c. &c. from the ENCYCLOPAEDIA BRITANNICA.

Chambers would have disagreed with this judgment. In his view, his ample use of cross-references allowed readers to learn the principles of any discipline by following all the cross-references in his short articles in disciplines. Furthermore, his overview of knowledge in the introduction to the Cyclopaedia listed articles to be read to understand any one of forty-seven major arts and sciences. In contrast, by presenting disciplines at length, the first edition of the Encyclopaedia Britannica had less need of cross-references or an overview of knowledge. Accordingly, it dispensed with any overview and offered far fewer cross-references than the Cyclopaedia had.

In the end, the first edition of the Britannica contained forty-four treatises. The longest were "Anatomy" (166 pages), "Chemistry" (117 pages), and "Medicine" (112 pages), while the shortest were shorter than many articles, though their large, centered titles continued to identify them as treatises. Page-wise, the treatises made up a little more than half of the encyclopedia.

== Sources used ==
Smellie compiled almost the entirety of the first edition alone. Supposedly, he "held Dictionary making in great contempt; and used to say jocularly, that he had made a Dictionary of Arts and Sciences with a pair of scissors, clipping out from various books a quantum sufficit of matter for the printer." Most of his sources are among the roughly one hundred listed in the front matter of volume 1, although a few, notably the French Encyclopédie (1751–1772) of Denis Diderot and Jean Le Rond D'Alembert, were probably listed mainly for show. Although he did not use the Encyclopédie directly to any significant extent, except in imitating what what still an unusual title, Smellie did copy articles from other encyclopedias, including the Cyclopaedia and the second edition of Coetlogon's encyclopedia, the New Universal History of Arts and Sciences (1759). Above all, he copied many short articles from New and Complete Dictionary of Arts and Sciences (1754–1755), published by William Owen. Among non-alphabetical sources, Smellie borrowed from the English translation of Voltaire's article on taste in the Encyclopédie for his own article "Taste", and from Benjamin Franklin's Experiments and Observations on Electricity (1751), pieced together with material from Joseph Priestley's History and Present State of Electricity (1767), in the treatise "Elecricity." More generally, much of his borrowing came from Scottish authors.

== Scope and contents ==
The first edition of the Encyclopaedia Britannica was subtitled A Dictionary of Arts and Sciences. Dictionaries of the arts and sciences are often considered as being the most direct precursors of modern, general encyclopedias. They emerged in the late seventeenth century and proliferated in Britain in the eighteenth century, the Cyclopaedia being the most successful example. In principle, they covered disciplines that could understood systematically (that is, the arts and sciences), not isolated facts, notably the facts of history, biography, and geography. Accordingly, historical dictionaries and dictionaries were still seen as complements for much of the eighteenth century. Well before the time of the Encyclopaedia Britannica, however, dictionaries of the arts and sciences had been encroaching on the territory of historical dictionaries. This trend can be seen in the history of the Encyclopaedia Britannica itself. Already in the first edition, there are thousands of articles on places, many of them copied from the New and Complete Dictionary of Arts and Sciences. In the second edition, a decision was made to offer biographies. In part, Smellie declined the editorship of the second edition for this very reason, reportedly saying that biographical articles would be "by no means consistent with the title Arts and Sciences."

Not surprisingly for a dictionary of arts and sciences, the first edition was weak in history. In geography, we have seen, it flouted the ideal of the dictionary of arts and sciences by including thousands of articles on places, but they tended to be short and superficial. In dealing with the mechanical arts (that is, technology), it merely matched the poor record of previous British dictionaries and arts and sciences, ignoring the extraordinary coverage in the Encyclopédie. Medicine and the sciences, though not mathematics, were among the encyclopedia's strongest domains, constituting the object of most of the longest treatises. Smellie compiled many of the scientific and medical treatises from recognized authorities: "Anatomy" from the works of the anatomists Alexander Monro primus and Jacob Winslǿw; "Chemistry" from the works of the chemist Pierre-Joseph Macquer; and "Midwifery" from the works of the other William Smellie, a celebrated midwife and obstetrician. One of the more notorious treatises was "Botany." Smellie had been a skeptic of the notion of plant sexuality since his days as a student at the University of Edinburgh, and he used the third section of "Botany" to mount a forceful attack on the concept, which was widely but universally accepted at the time.

== Illustrations ==
The first edition of the Encyclopaedia Britannica included 160 copperplate illustrations signed by Bell and interspersed at appropriate places throughout the three volumes. Some featured images on a single subject, while some were miscellanies. Plate 1, for example, offered six images: two of an abacus, one of a plant, one of an arachnid, and two of fish. In the judgment of Werner Hupka, the plates on plants and animals were especially well-rendered. Bell borrowed many if not most plates from other works.

Along with the text, the illustrations accompanying the treatise "Midwifery" offended some readers. Plate 112 in particular showed an exposed vulva as well as cross-sections of a pregnant woman's pelvis. The writer and surgeon-apothecary William Bewley grumbled that the treatise "occupies and defiles no less than 40" pages. Citing no evidence, Paul Kruse asserted: "When the article on midwifery appeared, the authorities felt the editors had gone a little too far in their how-to-do-it approach, particularly in the illustrations ... They advised the purchasers to rip the pages from their copies, and ordered the publishers to destroy the offending plates." Also citing no evidence, Herman Kogan told the story somewhat differently: "Many who considered the illustrations obscene ripped the offending pages from the volume and some, especially parents with children in school, threatened in addition to start legal action against Bell and Macfarquhar."

== Success and reception ==
The critical reception of the first edition of the Britannica was at best unenthusiastic. The most damning review appeared in the Monthly Review, written anonymously by William Bewley. He was unimpressed with the work's organizational novelty and found its unacknowledged copying reprehensible: "On the whole, we shall only further observe with regard to it [the first edition], that it is so formed on an exceptionable plan, injudiciously, negligently, in some instances ignorantly, and on the whole, we may add, dishonestly, executed." Still, the first edition was reprinted twice more, for example, than the first edition of Coetlogon's Universal History of Arts and Sciences (with zero reprintings). In this sense, it can be counted a modest success. It was enough a one, in any event, to determine Bell and Macfarquhar to undertake a second edition. Smellie, for his part, declined to participate, in part because he opposed the introduction of biographical articles.
