= Thomas Dobson (printer) =

Thomas Dobson (1751 near Edinburgh, Scotland – 1823 in Philadelphia, Pennsylvania) was a master printer most famous for having published the earliest American version of the Encyclopædia Britannica, and the first in the United States to publish a complete Hebrew Bible.

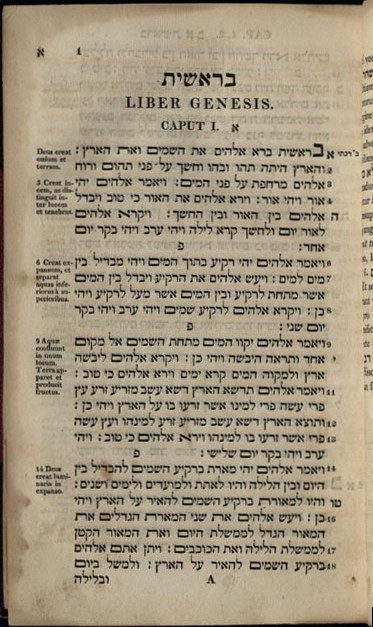
Hebrew Bible, published by Thomas Dobson in Philadelphia, 1814 source: Library of Congress

== Dobson's Encyclopaedia ==
The 18-volume third edition of the Encyclopædia Britannica began to be published in 1788 in Scotland, and was well received. It was by far the best edition of the Britannica to date, and remained so until roughly the 7th edition. (See History of the Encyclopædia Britannica for more details.) The third edition was completed in 1797, with a two-volume supplement added in 1801.

In this era, enterprising American printers were matching their British counterparts in quality and quantity, and severely undercutting them in price as well. A successful master printer, Dobson objected to a perceived British bias in the Britannica and resolved to re-edit the Britannica to be more fair. He completed his "Encyclopedia" in April 1798, a year after the original. He also added a supplement of three volumes in 1803. Dobson's encyclopædia had 16,650 pages with 595 engraved copperplates; both numbers are slightly greater than their British counterparts. In support of Dobson's patriotic initiative, then-President George Washington subscribed to two sets of his first American encyclopædia, one of which now rests with most of the rest of George Washington's personal library in the Boston Athenæum.

== Other publications ==
Dobson also published the first secular music composed by an American, namely, Seven Songs for Harpsichord by Francis Hopkinson.

Dobson also contributed to the development of American Unitarianism.

== Family life ==
Dobson married Jean Paton on 5 October 1777 in New Grayfriars Parish in Scotland. They had three daughters in Edinburgh:

1. Margaret Dobson (1779–1827)
2. Alison Dobson (born 6 October 1780)
3. Catharine Dobson (born 15 November 1782)

... And one son in Philadelphia:

4. Judah Dobson (1792–1850)

The family moved to the United States in 1783 or 1784; by 1785, Dobson had a thriving printing business in Philadelphia.

In 1822, Dobson retired from book-selling due to old age and ill health. He died the following year.
