= Thomson Bonar =

British businessman (1739–1814)

- Born: c. 1739
- Died: July 25, 1814 (aged 74–75)
- Resting place: St Cuthbert's Churchyard, Edinburgh, Scotland
- Occupation: Publisher / bookseller
- Known for: Publisher of the Encyclopædia Britannica (3rd–5th editions); held copyright to the 3rd edition supplement
- Relatives: Andrew Bell (father-in-law); grandson Thomson Bonar (1799–1861)

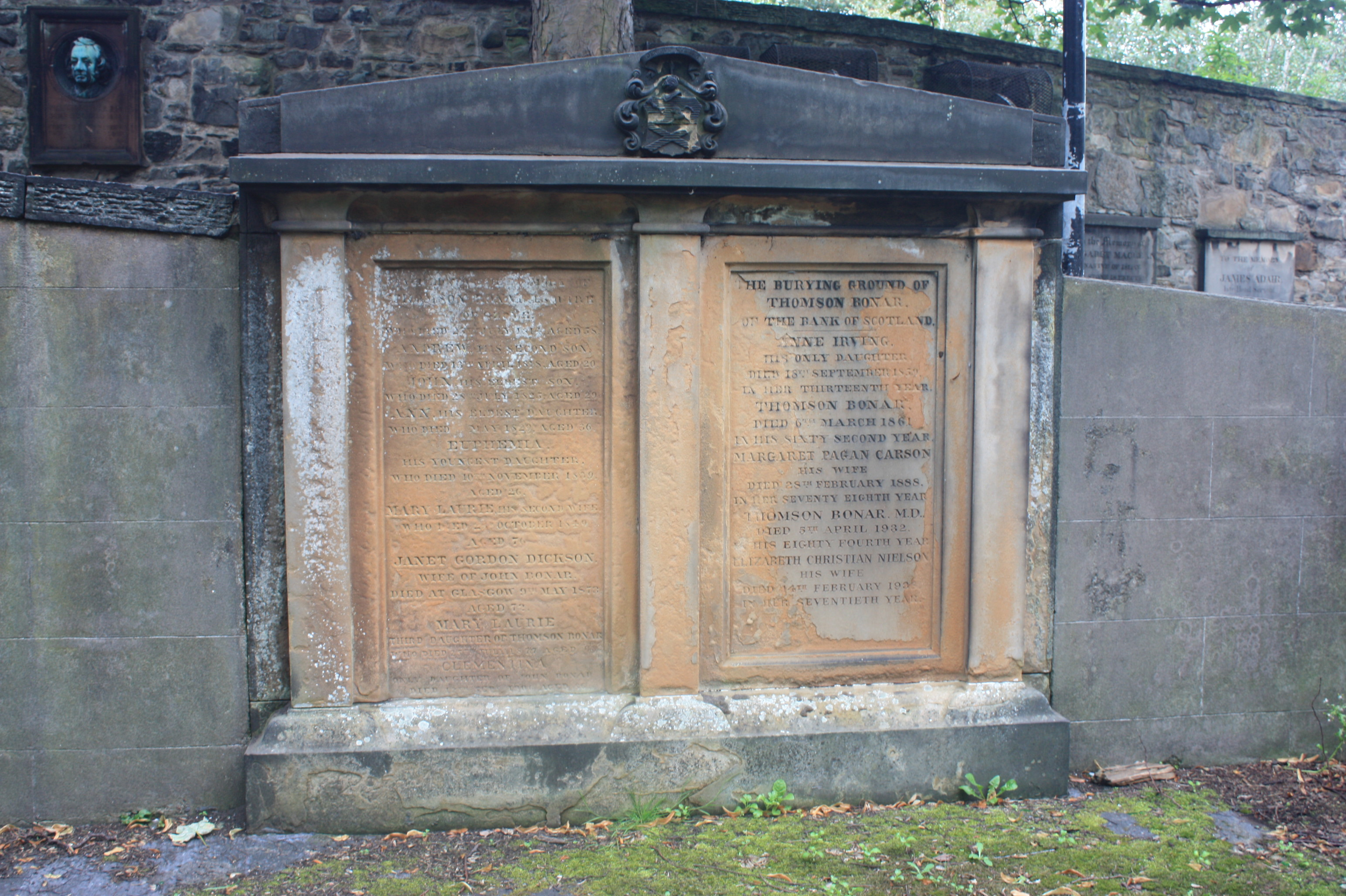
Thomson Bonar's grave, St Cuthberts Churchyard, Edinburgh

Thomson Bonar (1738/1739 – 25 July 1814) was a wine-merchant who married Elizabeth, the daughter of the engraver Andrew Bell, who co-founded the Encyclopædia Britannica with Colin Macfarquhar.

Bonar sold the 3rd through 5th editions of the Britannica, and produced the supplement to the 3rd edition Bonar held the copyright for that supplement, for whose material he asked great sums (20,000 pounds sterling) in subsequent editions, although he was granted but little (100–200 pounds). Bonar was friendly to the article authors, and introduced the policy of paying them as well as the article reviewers, and of allowing them to retain copyright for separate publication of their work.

Bonar quarreled with his father-in-law, Andrew Bell, and the two men did not speak from 1799 to 1809, when Bell died. Bell's successor, Archibald Constable, wisely bought out Bonar's copyright for the 5th edition and kept him as an ally of the Britannica.

Thomson died on 25 July 1814, aged 75. He is buried in the northern section of St Cuthberts Churchyard in Edinburgh. The stone backs onto the access path from Princes Street. His grandson of the same name (1799–1861) is buried with him.
