= Warren E. Preece =

- Born: Warren Eversleigh Preece; April 17, 1921 Norwalk, Connecticut, United States
- Died: April 11, 2007 (aged 85) Philadelphia, Pennsylvania, United States
- Occupation: Editor, Encyclopedist
- Period: 1948-1979
- Genre: Nonfiction

Warren Eversleigh Preece (April 17, 1921 – April 11, 2007) was editor of Encyclopædia Britannica from 1964 to 1975, during the development of "Britannica 3" (the 15th edition). This 28-volume edition separated the content into three parts, the Propædia (Outline of Knowledge), Micropædia (Ready Reference) and Macropædia (Knowledge in Depth).

Preece was born in Norwalk, Connecticut, and educated at Dartmouth College. He graduated Phi Beta Kappa with a B.A. in 1943. After serving with the U.S. Army in the Philippines in World War II, he earned an M.A. degree from Columbia University in 1947.

Before joining Britannica he worked as a newspaper reporter and copy editor, an English teacher, and public relations director for U.S. Senator Thomas Dodd of Connecticut.

In 1957, he was hired by William Benton, publisher of Britannica, as secretary to the board of editors. In 1964 he became editor of the encyclopedia. He held this position (with an interruption in 1968-69, the year of the Britannica's bicentennial) until 1975, the year after the publication of the 15th edition. The 15th edition was a major change in the encyclopedia, and Preece was an important figure in its development. After his resignation as editor, he continued to serve as vice chairman of the board of editors until 1979.

He was coauthor of The Technological Order (1962) and a contributor to Britannica, notably on the topic of higher education. He was also associated with the Center for the Study of Democratic Institutions in Santa Barbara, California.

He died on April 11, 2007, of heart failure in Philadelphia, Pennsylvania.

== See also ==
- History of the Encyclopædia Britannica
- William Benton, owner of the Britannica through most of Preece's tenure
- Encyclopædia Britannica, Inc.
