= Philip W. Goetz =

Philip Whitehead Goetz (1927 – October 1, 2008) was the Executive Editor (under Chief Editor Warren E. Preece) for the first version of the 15th edition of the Encyclopædia Britannica. More importantly, he was the Chief Editor for the second version of the 15th edition, which was a massive revision and re-organization of the Britannica.

Goetz, who obtained a B.S. from Northwestern University in 1950 and joined Britannica in 1952, served as Chief Editor from 1979 to 1991. He is given critical acclaim for making the second version a much more useful encyclopedia, moving it away from the epistemological preconceptions of Mortimer J. Adler.
