= AnaBritannica =

Serialised Turkish encyclopedia in English

- Country: Turkey

The AnaBritannica is an encyclopedia produced by Ana Publishing House that began publication in Turkey on November 5, 1986. It was designed to be published in weekly fascicles of 64 pages for four years and to total 14,400 pages upon publication of the final fascicle. Its organization and editorial structure were designed in cooperation with Encyclopædia Britannica Inc. The fascicles were designed by Bülent Erkmen.

AnaBritannica is based on the Encyclopædia Britannica Micropædia, with approximately 120,000 entries and 20,000 images. It incorporates approximately 30,000 articles written for the Eastern Hemisphere, which Encyclopædia Britannica used as a source to correct its own previous entries.

The third fascicle of AnaBritannica was confiscated, and a legal case brought against the encyclopedia for acting against the unity of the state. The cases ended up in acquittal and resulted in popular support.

In the past, some Turkish newspapers gave this encyclopedia in return for collected coupons.
