= Peter John Wyllie =

British petrologist and academic (born 1930)

Peter John Wyllie (born 8 February 1930, in London, England) is a British petrologist and academic.

He was Professor of Geology at the California Institute of Technology from 1983 until his retirement in 1999. Prior to this, he held positions at the University of St Andrews (1955–56), Pennsylvania State University (1958–59 and 1961–66), the University of Leeds (1959–61), and the University of Chicago (1965–83). He is well known for his many contributions to the understanding of magmatism, particularly through his work on the experimental petrology of magmas and volatiles. In the early 1970s, Wyllie wrote two widely used textbooks; The Dynamic Earth (1971) and The Way the Earth Works (1976) which integrated the new understanding of magmatism and plate tectonics. He is also famous for his contributions to the coverage of earth sciences in the Encyclopædia Britannica, particularly his outline of the field in Part Two of the Propædia. Wyllie was President of the International Union of Geodesy and Geophysics (IUGG) from 1995 to 1999.

== Awards and honours ==
- Polar Medal, 1954
- National Academy of Sciences, USA, 1981
- Wollaston Medal, Geological Society of London, 1982
- Fellow of the Royal Society, London, 1984
- Roebling Medal, Mineralogical Society of America, 2001
