= Encyclopædia Britannica, Inc. =

American publisher

- Founded: 1768; 258 years ago Edinburgh, Scotland
- Founder: Colin Macfarquhar; Andrew Bell
- Country of origin: Scotland
- Headquarters location: Chicago, Illinois, U.S.
- Key people: Jacqui Safra (president); Jorge Cauz (CEO)
- Imprints: Merriam-Webster
- Owner: Jacqui Safra
- Official website: corporate.britannica.com

Encyclopædia Britannica, Inc. is the company known for publishing the Encyclopædia Britannica, the world’s oldest continuously published encyclopaedia. Founded in Edinburgh, Scotland, and historically British, the company has been American-owned since 1901 and is now based in Chicago, Illinois. The company also owns the American dictionary publisher Merriam-Webster.

== History ==
=== Founding years ===
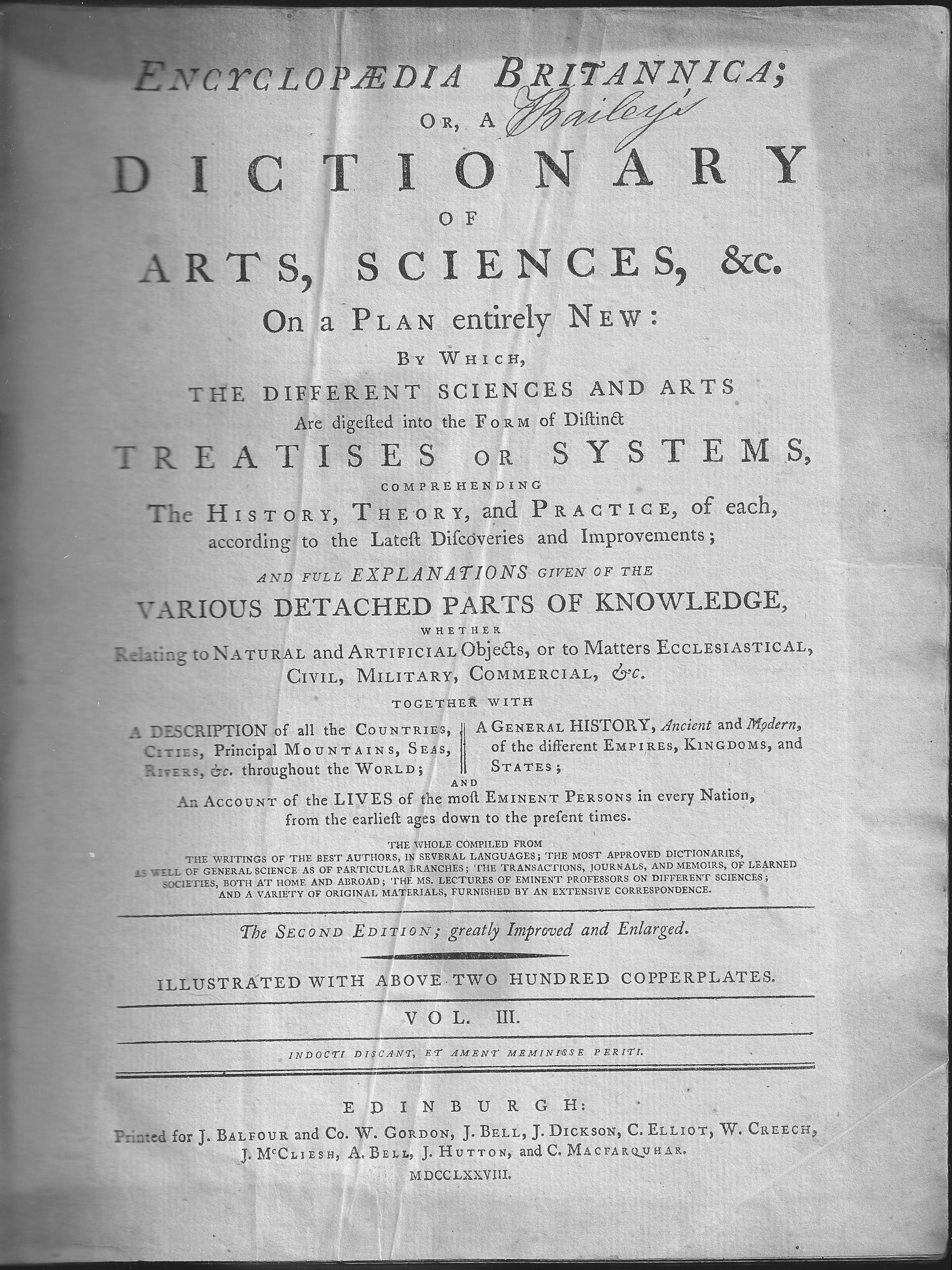
Front page of volume 3 of the 1778 Encyclopædia Britannica

The company was founded in Edinburgh, Scotland, in the 18th century, during the historical period termed the Scottish Enlightenment. Colin Macfarquhar and Andrew Bell began the first edition in 1768. The pair engaged William Smellie, who compiled most of the articles in the first edition. The second edition was published in 1784. After Macfarquhar's death in 1793, Bell became its sole proprietor and published the third and fourth editions.

Archibald Constable, an Edinburgh publisher, published the fifth and sixth editions. When Constable died in 1827, A & C Black Ltd. bought the copyrights to the encyclopaedia at auction, and they published it for the next 70 years.

Beginning with the ninth edition in 1875, the range of topics were expanded by bringing in contributors from the literary field, social sciences and the scientific community. The ninth edition has since been acknowledged as one of the most impressive collections of scholarship ever produced.

In 1901, Americans Horace E. Hooper and Walter M. Jackson, who had been marketing the encyclopaedia since 1897, purchased all copyrights. They formed sales companies in both the United States and England. Hugh Chisholm became the editor for the tenth, eleventh and twelfth editions.

=== Sears Roebuck ownership ===
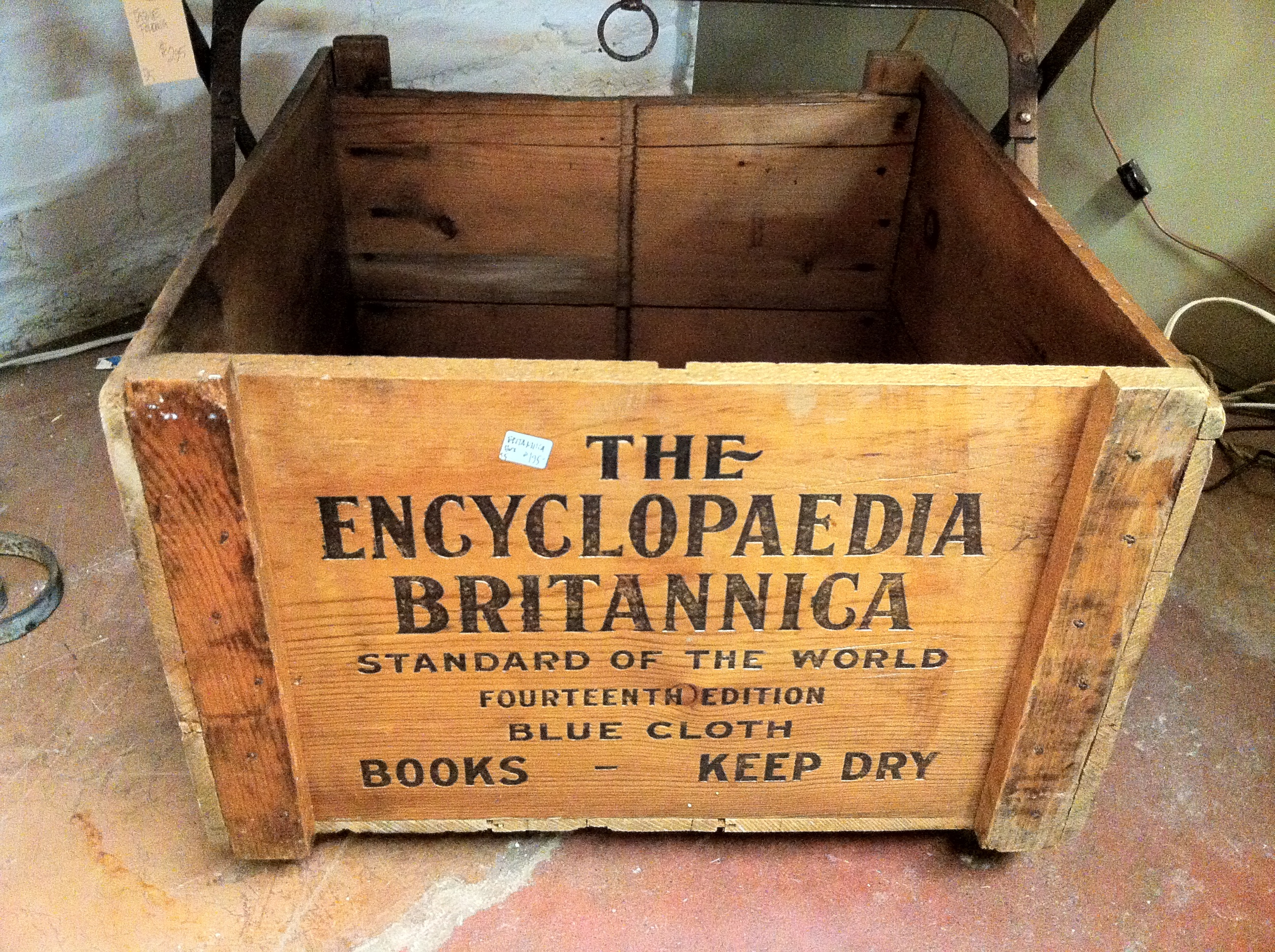
Shipping box for the fourteenth edition

In 1915, Sears agreed to market a new and less expensive version of the eleventh edition for middle-class buyers. (Note: Advertisement for the 11th edition, "Handy Volume", by Sears in The Saturday Evening Post (1916)) In 1920, Sears bought Britannica outright, and after only three years of operation, Sears reported a loss of $1.8 million. In 1923, it sold the company back to the widow of Hooper (who had died in 1922) and her brother William Cox; they published the twelfth and thirteenth editions in 1922 and 1926. After Cox failed to raise the money needed to publish the fourteenth edition, Sears ended up financing it and resumed ownership of Britannica in 1928.

In 1932, Sears restructured Britannica, ending sales through its outlets, opting instead for a network of sales representatives who went door-to-door, and staffing booths at conventions and shopping centres. In 1938, Britannica began publishing a yearly synopsis of world events, called the Britannica Book of the Year.

=== Benton family ownership ===
In 1941, Sears gave Britannica to the University of Chicago. However, the university did not believe it could manage the company. William Benton, then vice president of the university, offered to put up the operating capital to protect the university against any losses. Benton bought two thirds of the stock, and later bought the remaining third. In 1952, Benton started preparations for the fifteenth edition.

Britannica acquired dictionary publisher Merriam-Webster in 1964 and Compton's Encyclopedia as well in the early 1960s.

Benton died in 1973, before the fifteenth edition was published in 1974. The newly titled Britannica 3 was composed of a ten-volume Micropædia, a 19-volume Macropædia and a one-volume guide to the encyclopaedia's use, called Propædia. In 1985, a two-volume index was added, as well as other refinements. Robert P. Gwinn succeeded Benton as publisher and chairman of Britannica in 1974. He divided the company's operations into Britannica USA and Britannica International. In 1990, nearly 120,000 encyclopaedias were sold in the United States, with sales for the year rising to $650 million. By 1994, sales had slumped to $453 million, with only 51,000 sets being sold in the U.S. Sales continued to decline after 1994, finally forcing the company to close more than 70 per cent of its sales offices.

=== Safra ownership ===
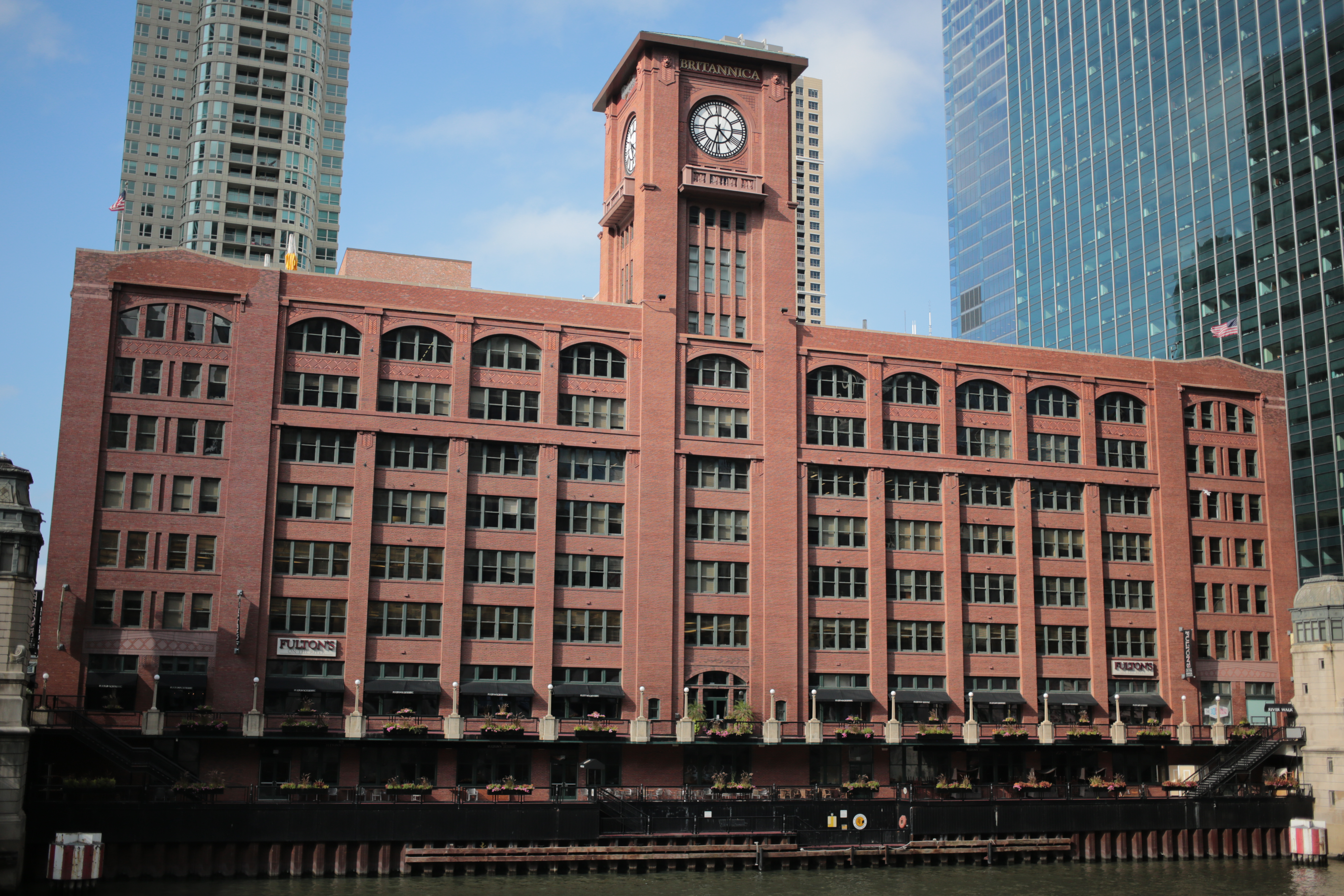
Headquarters of Encyclopædia Britannica, Inc., at the Reid, Murdoch & Co. Building in Chicago

In 1996, Britannica was sold to an investment group led by Jacob E. Safra, a Swiss financier. He restructured the company, laying off more than 120 people including many of the company's top employees. Safra also dissolved the home sales force, with an additional 140 losing their jobs, along with 300 independent contractors. In 1999, they launched Britannica.com, which contained the complete Encyclopædia Britannica. Britannica.com laid off 20 per cent of its work force one year later.

In 2009, Britannica Global Edition was printed with 30 volumes. It contained over 40,000 articles and 8,500 photographs. By the 2010s Britannica had begun to heavily focus on the education sector and the creation of educational products aimed at institutions. On 14 September 2010, Encyclopædia Britannica, Inc. announced a partnership with mobile phone development company Concentric Sky to launch a series of iPhone products aimed at the K–12 market. On 20 July 2011, Encyclopædia Britannica, Inc. announced that Concentric Sky had ported the Britannica Kids product line to Intel's Intel Atom-based Netbooks and on 26 October 2011 that it had launched its encyclopaedia as an iPad app. In 2010, Britannica released Britannica ImageQuest, a database of images.

In 2012, after 244 years, Britannica ended the print editions, with the 32 volumes of the 2010 instalment being the last on paper; future editions have been published exclusively online since.

In 2018, the company released Britannica Insights, an extension for the Chrome web browser. The extension supplements Google's featured snippets. In 2019, in a partnership with Binumi, Britannica released a video product that gives schools the opportunity to use millions of royalty-free multimedia clips to create digital storytelling projects about content they are already teaching.

In 2020, Encyclopædia Britannica released the Britannica All New Children's Encyclopedia: What We Know and What We Don't, an encyclopaedia aimed primarily at younger readers, covering major topics. The encyclopaedia was widely praised for bringing back the print format. It was Britannica's first encyclopaedia for children since 1984. ProCon.org was acquired by Encyclopædia Britannica in 2020.

== See also ==
- Encyclopædia Britannica First Edition
- Encyclopædia Britannica Second Edition
- Encyclopædia Britannica Third Edition
- Encyclopædia Britannica Eleventh Edition
- Encyclopædia Britannica Films
- Encyclopædia Britannica Online
- Encyclopædia Britannica Ultimate Reference Suite
- Encyclopaedia Britannica Educational Corp. v. Crooks
- Lists of encyclopedias
- List of encyclopedias by date
- List of online encyclopedias
