= Cauz =

Cauz is a surname. Notable people with the surname include:

- Cristian Cauz (born 1996), Italian footballer
- Francesca Cauz (born 1992), Italian racing cyclist
- Jorge Cauz (fl. from 1999), American businessman of Mexican descent
