= Encyclopaedia Britannica Educational Corp. v. Crooks =

Encyclopaedia Britannica Educational Corp. v. Crooks, 542 F.Supp. 1156 (1982), was a landmark legal case in the United States in which it was decided that making off-the-air copies of publicly broadcast television programs does not constitute fair use, even if it is intended for a non-commercial and charitable purpose.

== Background ==
The defendant had made off-the-air recordings of television programs with educational content from a publicly broadcast television service. The recordings were then made available to the students of the school district.

== Plaintiff ==
The plaintiffs were Encyclopaedia Britannica Educational Corporation, Learning Corporation of America, and Time-Life Films.

== Defendant ==
The defendants were the Board of Educational Services, First Supervisory District, Erie County, New York [BOCES], and its individual officers and directors. BOCES was created under section 1950 of the New York Education Law for the purpose of providing educational services and specialized instruction on a cooperative basis to the 19 school districts within its geographic region. It is a non-profit organization funded by the 19 school districts.

== Decision ==
The court's decision was as follows:

On June 21, 1982, BOCES was found to be in violation of the law. On March 10, 1983, BOCES was ordered to immediately cease copying and pay the requisite damages to the plaintiff.

The court determined that defendants’ highly organized and systematic practice of making off-the-air videotapes and derivative copies of plaintiffs’ televised copyrighted works did not constitute fair use under the copyright laws.
