= Encyclopædia Britannica =

General-knowledge encyclopaedia

- Author: As of 2008, 4,411 named contributors
- Illustrator: Several; initial engravings by Andrew Bell
- Language: British English
- Subject: General knowledge
- Published: Since 1768; 258 years ago
- Publisher: Encyclopædia Britannica, Inc.
- Publication date: 1768–2010 (printed version); 1994–present (online)
- Publication place: United Kingdom (1768–1901); United States (1901–present)
- Media type: Multivolume print (discontinued in 2012), 15 named editions, see edition summary; CD-ROM; Online digital (Britannica.com)
- Dewey Decimal: 031
- Website: britannica.com

The Encyclopædia Britannica (Latin for 'British Encyclopædia') is a general-knowledge English-language encyclopaedia. It has been published since 1768 and, after several ownership changes, is currently owned by Encyclopædia Britannica, Inc. The 15th edition, published in 1974, spans 32 volumes and 32,640 pages and was the last printed edition. Since 2016, it has been published online at Britannica.com.

Printed for 245 years, the Britannica was the longest-running in-print encyclopaedia in the English language. It was first published between 1768 and 1771 in Edinburgh, Scotland, in weekly instalments that came together to form three volumes. At first, the encyclopaedia grew quickly in size from edition to edition. The second edition expanded to 10 volumes, and by its fourth edition (1801–1810), it had expanded to 20 volumes. Since the beginning of the twentieth century, its size, measured as total word count, has remained roughly steady at about 40 million words.

The Britannica has had many notable contributors. The 9th (1875–1889) and 11th editions (1911) are considered landmark encyclopaedias for scholarship and literary style. Following its acquisition in 1901 by an American firm and starting with the 11th edition, the encyclopaedia shortened and simplified articles to broaden its appeal to the North American market. Though published in the United States since 1901, the Britannica has mostly maintained British English spellings.

In 1932, the Britannica adopted a policy of "continuous revision," in which the encyclopaedia is continually revised and reprinted, with every article updated on a schedule. The publishers of Compton's Pictured Encyclopedia had already pioneered such a policy.

The 15th edition (1974–2010) has a three-part structure: a 12-volume Micropædia of short articles (generally fewer than 750 words), a 17-volume Macropædia of long articles (two to 310 pages), and a single Propædia volume to give a hierarchical outline of knowledge. The Micropædia was meant for quick fact-checking and as a guide to the Macropædia; readers are advised to study the Propædia outline to understand a subject's context and to find more detailed articles.

In the 21st century, Britannica faced competition: initially from the digital and multimedia encyclopaedia Microsoft Encarta, and later from the online mass-collaboration encyclopaedia Wikipedia. While it continued to score well in assessments of overall quality, compared to its competitors, it could not (as an expert-authored compilation of a limited number of articles on important subjects only) match their breadth of coverage and continuous updating.

In March 2012, it announced it would no longer publish printed editions and would focus instead on the online version.

== History ==
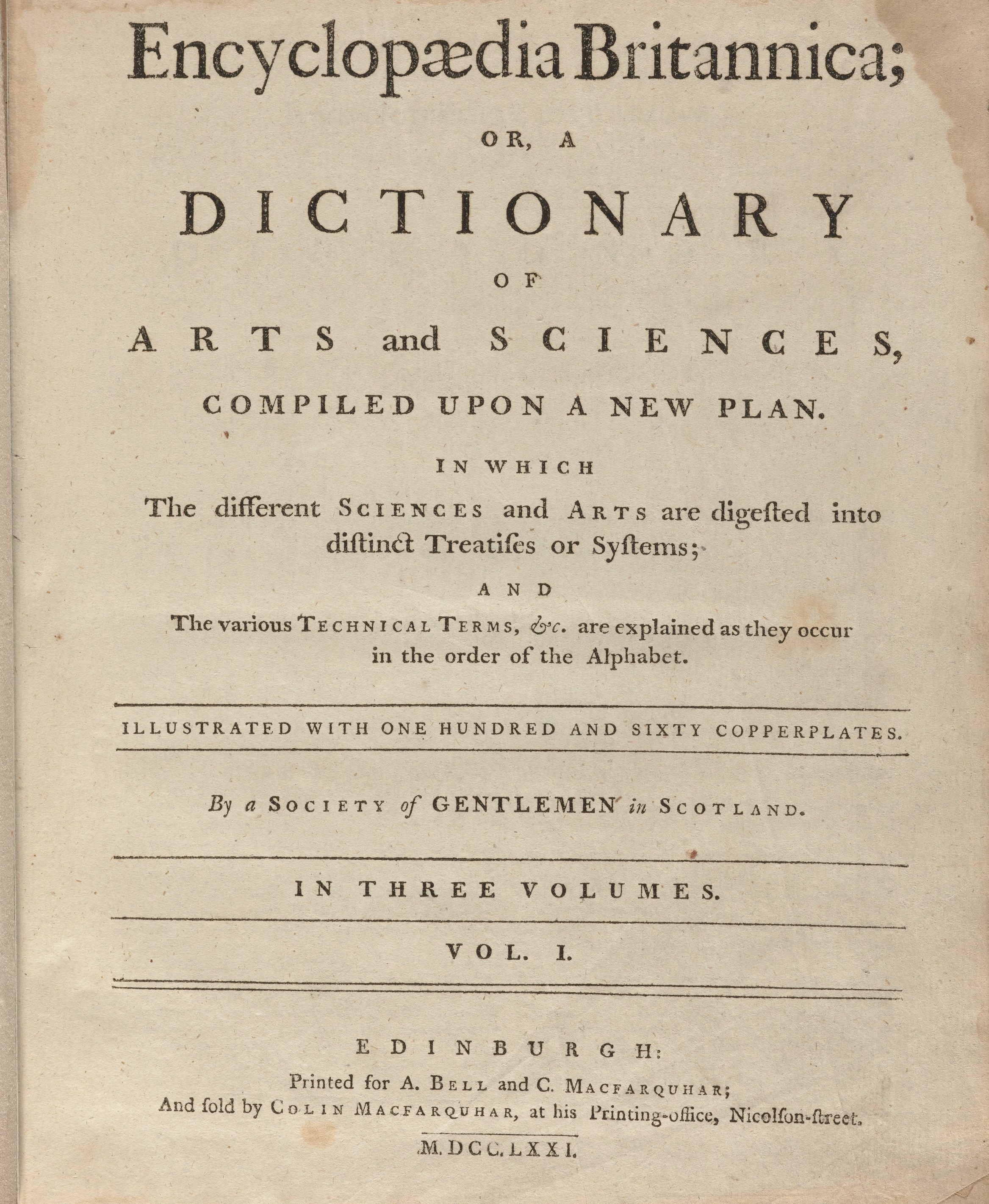
The title page of the first edition of the Encyclopædia Britannica, published in 1768–71

Past owners have included, in chronological order, the Scottish printers Colin Macfarquhar and Andrew Bell, the Scottish bookseller Archibald Constable, the Scottish publisher A. & C. Black, Horace Everett Hooper, Sears Roebuck, William Benton, and Jacqui Safra, a Swiss billionaire residing in New York.

Recent advances in information technology and the rise of electronic encyclopaedias such as Encyclopædia Britannica Ultimate Reference Suite, Encarta and Wikipedia have reduced the demand for print encyclopaedias. To remain competitive, Encyclopædia Britannica, Inc. has stressed the reputation of the Britannica, reduced its price and production costs, and developed electronic versions on CD-ROM, DVD, and the World Wide Web. Since the early 1930s, the company has also promoted spin-off reference works.

=== Editions ===
The Encyclopaedia Britannica has been issued in 15 editions, with multi-volume supplements to the 3rd edition and to the 4th, 5th, and 6th editions as a group (see the Table below). The 5th and 6th editions were reprints of the 4th, and the 10th edition was only a supplement to the 9th, just as the 12th and 13th editions were supplements to the 11th. For the 15th edition (1974), the Britannica underwent a massive reorganization and became the New Encyclopaedia Britannica. The 14th and 15th editions were edited every year throughout their runs, so that later printings of each were quite different from early ones.

Throughout its history, the Britannica has had two aims: to be an excellent reference book, and to provide educational material. In 1974, the 15th edition adopted a third goal: to systematize all human knowledge.

The history of the Britannica can be divided into five eras, punctuated by changes in management or reorganization of the encyclopaedia.

==== 1768–1824 ====
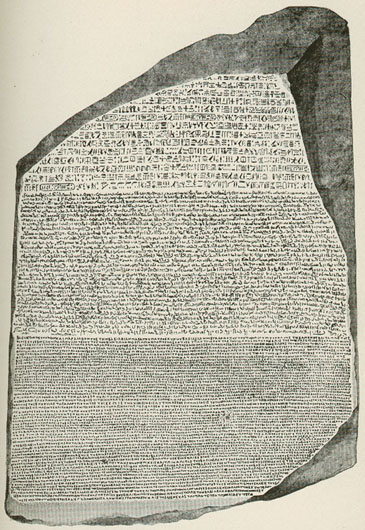
The early 19th-century editions of Encyclopædia Britannica included influential, original research such as Thomas Young's article on Egypt, which included the translation of the hieroglyphs on the Rosetta Stone (pictured).

In the first era (1st–6th editions, 1768–1824), the Britannica was managed and published by its founders, Colin Macfarquhar and Andrew Bell, and by Archibald Constable.

The Britannica was first published in serial instalments between December 1768 and about August 1771 in Edinburgh as the Encyclopædia Britannica, or, A Dictionary of Arts and Sciences, compiled upon a New Plan. The new plan in question was an organizational one, namely to include two kinds of typographically distinct entries (articles and longer "treatises") in a single alphabetical sequence. In principle, "treatises" were to cover the arts and sciences, leaving articles to deal with their subordinate objects. The idea may have been inspired by Dennis de Coetlogon's Universal History of Arts and Sciences, an alphabetical encyclopaedia that contained only treatises. Regardless, the Britannica continued to intermix formally distinguished articles and treatises through the 10th edition.

According to Arthur Herman's book How the Scots Invented the Modern World, the Encyclopaedia Britannica is one of the most enduring legacies of the Scottish Enlightenment. It is important to be more specific, however, about how the early Britannica was and was not Scottish and a monument to the Scottish Enlightenment. The two publishers and William Smellie, whom they engaged to compile the work, were all Scots. Much of the first edition was compiled by Smellie from Scottish sources. At the same time, despite working in Edinburgh, the centre of the Scottish Enlightenment, neither Smellie nor James Tytler, the editor of the second edition, arranged for contributions from any local luminaries. Nor does the work seem to have been much noticed by participants in the Scottish Enlightenment before its third edition. Likewise, it is significant that the title chosen was the Encyclopaedia Britannica (and not the Encyclopaedia Scotorum, or 'Scottish Encyclopaedia'). Indeed, by the time of the third edition, the Britannica was starting to evolve into a symbol of Britishness.

In this era, the Britannica grew significantly in size, sales, and reputation. Just as important were changes to the way it was compiled and edited. On his tombstone, Smellie was characterized as the editor of the first edition of the Britannica, but he was not an editor in anything like the sense in which Macvey Napier, who edited the Supplement to the Fourth, Fifth, and Sixth Editions, was. Smellie compiled nearly all the articles in the first edition himself, although we know he had minor help from at least one contributor, James Anderson, who wrote the articles "Dictionary," "Pneumatics," and "Smoke." For the third edition and its Supplement, editors still compiled the bulk of the articles, but they were assisted by dozens of collaborators. We know of thirty-five who wrote for the third edition, for example, some of them named in the preface, including the chemist Joseph Black and the natural philosopher John Robison. Then, by the time of the Supplement, Napier had become mostly a managing editor. He still wrote some articles, but his main job was recruiting collaborators, for the prospectus stipulated that "the various articles, in the Supplement, shall be written by the most Eminent Men, in the different departments of Science."

Several other encyclopaedias competed with the Britannica throughout this period, among them editions of Ephraim Chambers' and Abraham Rees's Cyclopædia, Coleridge's Encyclopædia Metropolitana, and David Brewster's Edinburgh Encyclopædia.

==== 1827–1901 ====
During the second era (7th–9th editions, 1827–1901), the Britannica was managed by the Edinburgh publishing firm A & C Black. Although some contributors were again recruited through friendships of the chief editors, notably Macvey Napier, others were attracted by the Britannica's reputation. The contributors often came from other countries and included the world's most respected authorities in their fields. A general index of all articles was included for the first time in the 7th edition, a practice maintained until 1974.

Production of the 9th edition was overseen by Thomas Spencer Baynes, the first English-born editor-in-chief. Dubbed the "Scholar's Edition", the 9th edition is the most scholarly of all Britannicas. After 1880, Baynes was assisted by William Robertson Smith. No biographies of living persons were included. James Clerk Maxwell and Thomas Huxley were special advisors on science. However, by the close of the 19th century, the 9th edition was outdated, and the Britannica faced financial difficulties.

==== 1901–1973 ====
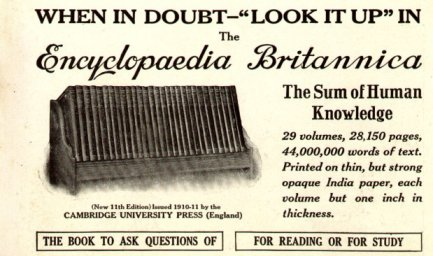
An advertisement for the 11th edition, published in the May 1913 issue of National Geographic

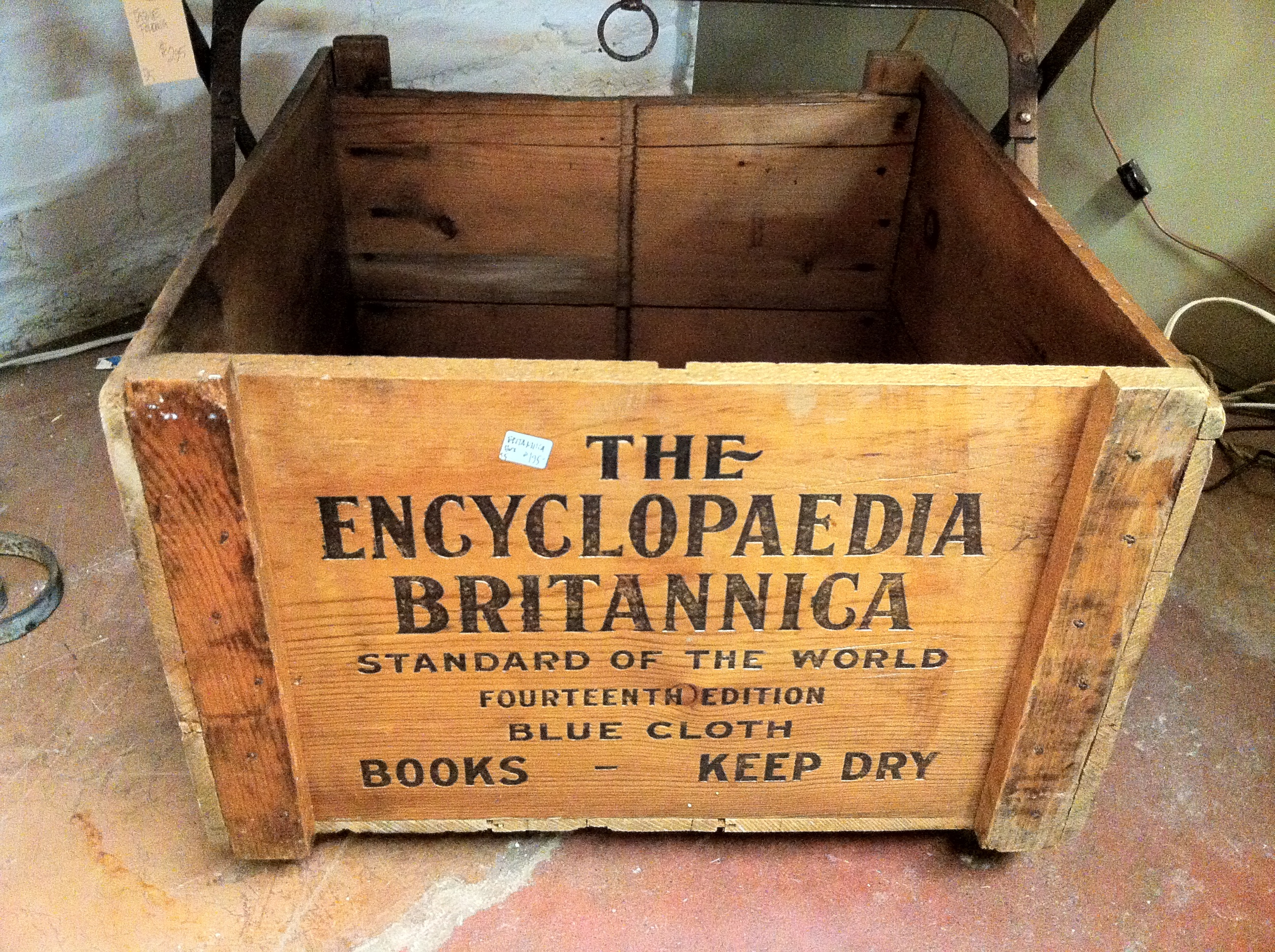
A wooden shipping crate for the 14th edition of the Britannica

In the third era (10th–14th editions, 1901–1973), the Britannica was managed by American businessmen who introduced direct marketing and door-to-door sales. The American owners gradually simplified articles, making them less scholarly for a mass market. The 10th edition was an eleven-volume supplement (including one each of maps and an index) to the 9th, numbered as volumes 25–35, but the 11th edition was a completely new work; its owner, Horace Hooper, lavished enormous effort on the project.

When Hooper fell into financial difficulties, the Britannica was managed by Sears Roebuck for 18 years (1920–1923, 1928–1943). In 1932, the vice-president of Sears, Elkan Harrison Powell, assumed presidency of the Britannica; in 1936, he began the policy of continuous revision. This was a departure from earlier practice, in which the articles were not changed until a new edition was produced, at roughly 25-year intervals, some articles unchanged from earlier editions. Powell developed new educational products that built upon the Britannica's reputation.

In 1943, Sears donated the Encyclopædia Britannica to the University of Chicago. William Benton, then a vice president of the university, provided the working capital for its operation. The stock was divided between Benton and the university, with the university holding an option on the stock. Benton became chairman of the board and managed the Britannica until his death in 1973. Benton set up the Benton Foundation, which managed the Britannica until 1996, and whose sole beneficiary was the University of Chicago. In 1968, the Britannica celebrated its bicentennial.

==== 1974–1994 ====
In the fourth era (1974–1994), the Britannica introduced its 15th edition, which was reorganized into three parts: the Micropædia, the Macropædia, and the Propædia. Under Mortimer J. Adler (member of the Board of Editors of Encyclopædia Britannica since its inception in 1949, and its chair from 1974; director of editorial planning for the 15th edition of Britannica from 1965), the Britannica sought not only to be a good reference work and educational tool, but to systematize all human knowledge. The absence of a separate index and the grouping of articles into parallel encyclopaedias (the Micro- and Macropædia) provoked a "firestorm of criticism" of the initial 15th edition. In response, the 15th edition was completely reorganized and indexed for a re-release in 1985. This second version of the 15th edition continued to be published and revised through the release of the 2010 print version. The official title of the 15th edition is The New Encyclopædia Britannica, although it has also been promoted as Britannica 3.

On 9 March 1976 the US Federal Trade Commission entered an opinion and order enjoining Encyclopædia Britannica, Inc. from using: a) deceptive advertising practices in recruiting sales agents and obtaining sales leads, and b) deceptive sales practices in the door-to-door presentations of its sales agents.

==== 1994–present ====
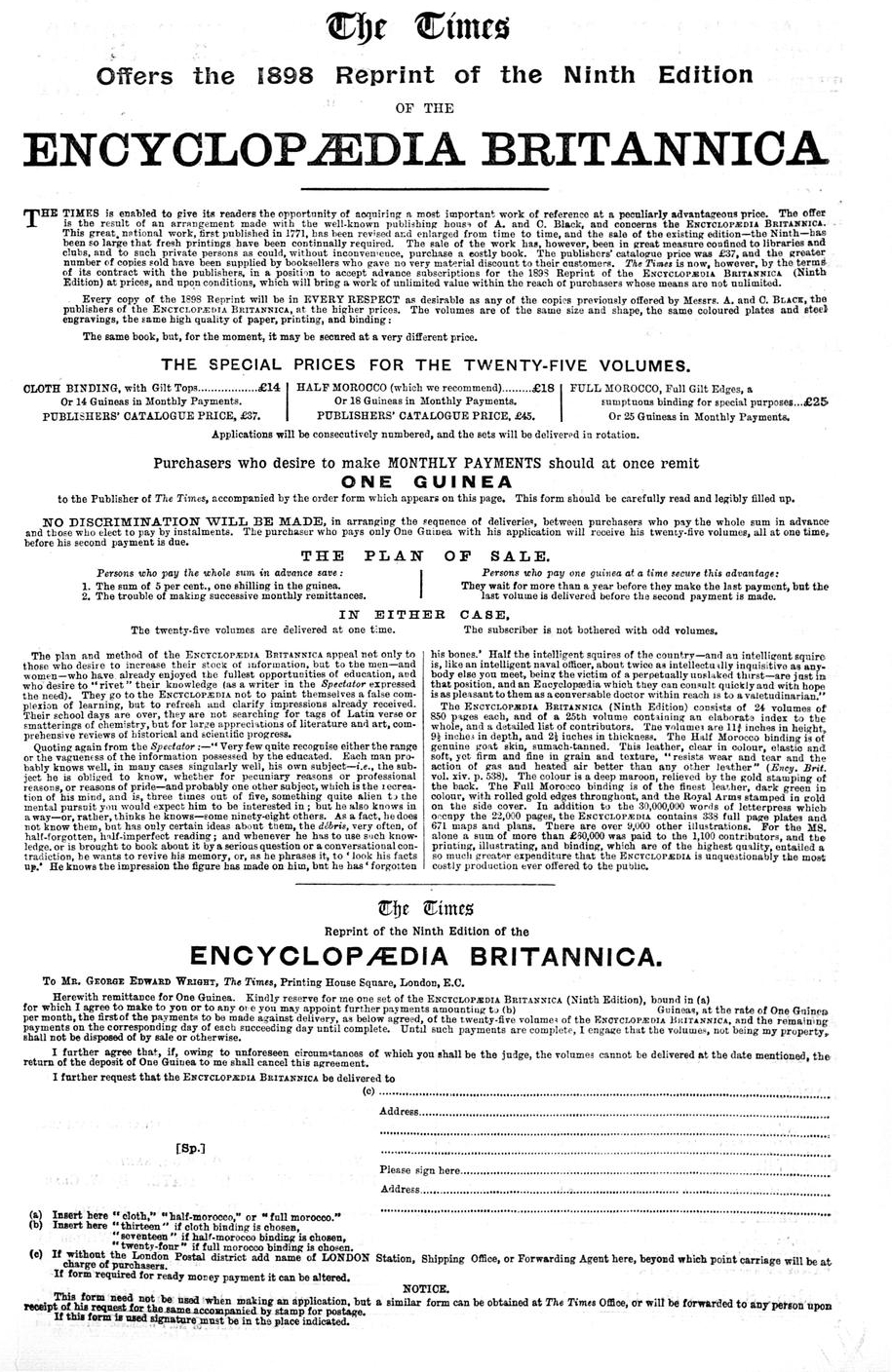
An 1898 advertisement for the 9th edition

In the fifth era (1994–present), digital versions have been developed and released on optical media and online.

In 1996, the Britannica was bought by Jacqui Safra at well below its estimated value, owing to the company's financial difficulties. Encyclopædia Britannica, Inc. split in 1999. One part retained the company name and developed the print version, and the other, Britannica.com Incorporated, developed digital versions. Since 2001, the two companies have shared a CEO, Ilan Yeshua, who has continued Powell's strategy of introducing new products with the Britannica name. In March 2012, Britannica's president, Jorge Cauz, announced that it would not produce any new print editions of the encyclopaedia, with the 2010 15th edition being the last. The company will focus only on the online edition and other educational tools.

Britannica's final print edition was in 2010, a 32-volume set. Britannica Global Edition was also printed in 2010, containing 30 volumes and 18,251 pages, with 8,500 photographs, maps, flags, and illustrations in smaller "compact" volumes, as well as over 40,000 articles written by scholars from across the world, including Nobel Prize winners. Unlike the 15th edition, it did not contain Macro- and Micropædia sections, but ran A through Z as all editions up through the 14th had. The following is Britannica's description of the work:

The editors of Encyclopædia Britannica, the world standard in reference since 1768, present the Britannica Global Edition. Developed specifically to provide comprehensive and global coverage of the world around us, this unique product contains thousands of timely, relevant, and essential articles drawn from the Encyclopædia Britannica itself, as well as from the Britannica Concise Encyclopedia, the Britannica Encyclopedia of World Religions, and Compton's by Britannica. Written by international experts and scholars, the articles in this collection reflect the standards that have been the hallmark of the leading English-language encyclopedia for over 240 years.

In 2020, Encyclopædia Britannica, Inc. released the Britannica All New Children's Encyclopedia: What We Know and What We Don't, an encyclopaedia aimed primarily at younger readers, covering major topics. The encyclopaedia was widely praised for bringing back the print format. It was Britannica's first encyclopaedia for children since 1984.

=== Dedications ===
The Britannica was dedicated to the reigning British monarch from 1788 to 1901 and then, upon its sale to an American partnership, to the British monarch and the President of the United States. Thus, the 11th edition is "dedicated by Permission to His Majesty George the Fifth, King of Great Britain and Ireland and of the British Dominions beyond the Seas, Emperor of India, and to William Howard Taft, President of the United States of America." The order of the dedications has changed with the relative power of the United States and Britain, and with relative sales; the 1954 version of the 14th edition is "Dedicated by Permission to the Heads of the Two English-Speaking Peoples, Dwight David Eisenhower, President of the United States of America, and Her Majesty, Queen Elizabeth the Second."

== Print version ==
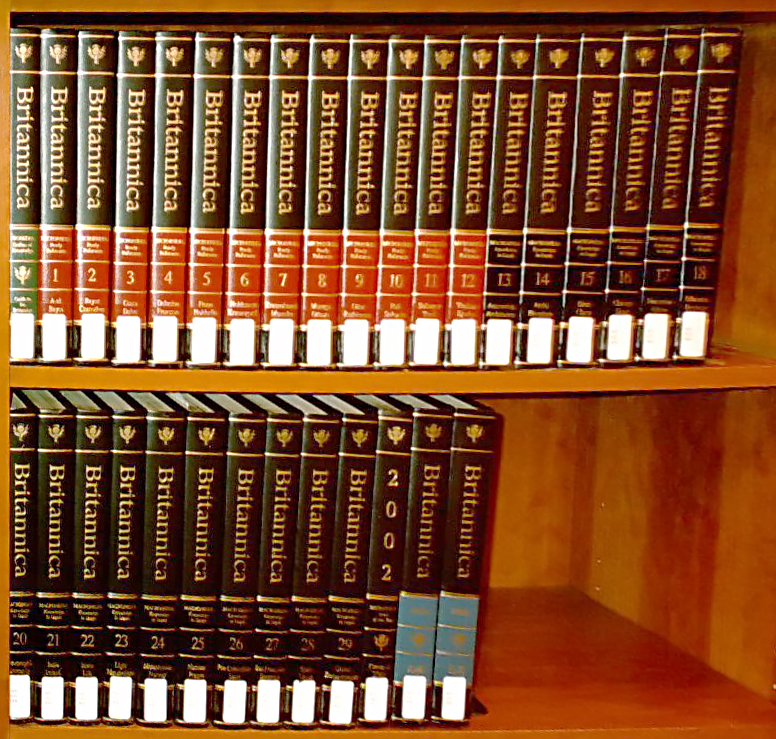
The 15th edition of the Britannica; the initial volume with the green spine is the Propædia; the red-spined and black-spined volumes are the Micropædia and the Macropædia, respectively. The last three volumes are the 2002 Book of the Year (black spine) and the two-volume index (cyan spine).

The logo of the Britannica has long been a thistle, the floral emblem of Scotland (see also plant badge).

From 1985, it consisted of four parts: the Micropædia, the Macropædia, the Propædia, and a two-volume index. The Britannica's articles are contained in the Micro- and Macropædia, which encompass 12 and 17 volumes, respectively, each volume having roughly one thousand pages. The 2007 Macropædia has 699 in-depth articles, ranging in length from two pages to 310 pages, with references and named contributors. In contrast, the 2007 Micropædia has roughly 65,000 articles, the vast majority (about 97%) of which contain fewer than 750 words, no references, and no named contributors. The Micropædia articles are intended for quick fact-checking and to help in finding more thorough information in the Macropædia. The Macropædia articles are meant as authoritative, well-written commentaries on their subjects, as well as storehouses of information not covered elsewhere. The longest article (310 pages) is on the subject of the United States, and it resulted from merging separate articles on the individual US states. A 2013 "Global Edition" of Britannica contained approximately 40,000 articles.

Information can be found in the Britannica by following the cross-references in the Micropædia and Macropædia; these are sparse, however, averaging one cross-reference per page. Readers are instead recommended to consult the alphabetical index or the Propædia, which organizes the Britannica's contents by topic.

The core of the Propædia is its "Outline of Knowledge", which aims to provide a logical framework for all human knowledge. Accordingly, the Outline is consulted by the Britannica's editors to decide which articles should be included in the Micro- and Macropædia. The Outline can also be used as a study guide, as it puts subjects in their proper perspective and suggests a series of Britannica articles for the student wishing to learn a topic in depth. However, libraries have found that it is scarcely used for this purpose, and reviewers have recommended that it be dropped from the encyclopaedia. The Propædia contains colour transparencies of human anatomy and several appendices listing the staff members, advisors, and contributors to all three parts of the Britannica.

Taken together, the Micropædia and Macropædia comprise roughly 40 million words and 24,000 images. The two-volume index has 2,350 pages, listing the 228,274 topics covered in the Britannica, together with 474,675 subentries under those topics. The Britannica generally prefers British spelling over American; for example, it uses colour (not color), centre (not center), and encyclopaedia (not encyclopedia). There are some exceptions to this rule, such as defense rather than defence. Common alternative spellings are provided with cross-references such as "Color: see Colour."

Since 1936, the contents (articles) of Britannica have been revised on a regular schedule, with at least 10% of the articles considered for revision each year. According to one Britannica website, 46% of the articles in the 2007 edition were revised over the preceding three years; however, according to another Britannica website, only 35% of the articles were revised over the same period.

The alphabetization of articles in the Micropædia and Macropædia follows strict rules. Diacritical marks and non-English letters are ignored, while numerical entries such as "1812, War of" are alphabetized as if the number had been written out ("Eighteen-twelve, War of"). Articles with identical names are ordered first by persons, then by places, then by things. Rulers with identical names are organized first alphabetically by country and then by chronology; thus, Charles III of France precedes Charles I of England, listed in Britannica as the ruler of Great Britain and Ireland. (That is, they are alphabetized as if their titles were "Charles, France, 3" and "Charles, Great Britain and Ireland, 1".) Similarly, places that share names are organized alphabetically by country, then by ever-smaller political divisions.

In March 2012, the company announced that the 2010 edition would be the last printed version. This was part of a move by the company to adapt to the times and focus on its future using digital distribution. The peak year for the printed encyclopaedia was 1990, when 120,000 sets were sold, but sales had dropped to 40,000 per annum by 1996. There were 12,000 sets of the 2010 edition printed, of which 8,000 had been sold by March 2012. By late April 2012, the remaining copies of the 2010 edition had sold out at Britannica's online store. As of 2016, a replica of Britannica's 1768 first edition is available via the online store.

== Related printed material ==
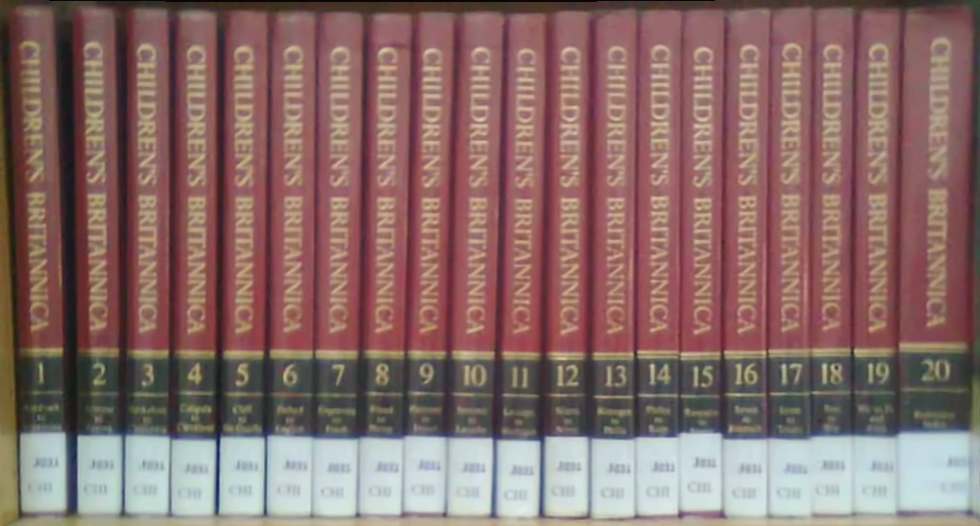
Children's Britannica

Britannica Junior was first published in 1934 as 12 volumes. It was expanded to 15 volumes in 1947, and renamed Britannica Junior Encyclopædia in 1963. It was taken off the market after the 1984 printing.

A British Children's Britannica edited by John Armitage was issued in London in 1960. Its contents were determined largely by the eleven-plus standardized tests given in Britain. Britannica introduced the Children's Britannica to the US market in 1988, aimed at ages seven to 14.

In 1961, a 16-volume Young Children's Encyclopaedia was issued for children just learning to read. My First Britannica is aimed at children ages six to 12, and the Britannica Discovery Library is for children aged three to six (issued 1974 to 1991). Compton's by Britannica, first published in 2007, incorporating the former Compton's Encyclopedia, is aimed at 10- to 17-year-olds and consists of 26 volumes and 11,000 pages.

There have been, and are, several abridged Britannica encyclopaedias. The single-volume Britannica Concise Encyclopædia has 28,000 short articles condensing the larger 32-volume Britannica; there are authorized translations in languages such as Chinese created by Encyclopedia of China Publishing House and Vietnamese.

Since 1938, Encyclopædia Britannica, Inc. has also published an annual Book of the Year to 'update' the encyclopaedia proper: this covers the past year's events and presents a variety of updated statistics (e.g. as to national populations, Nobel Prize winners, and the like). A given edition of the Book of the Year is named in terms of the year of its publication, though the volume actually covers the events and statistics of the previous year.

The company also publishes several specialized reference works, such as Shakespeare: The Essential Guide to the Life and Works of the Bard (2006).

== Optical disc, online, and mobile versions ==
The Britannica Ultimate Reference Suite 2012 DVD contains over 100,000 articles. This includes regular Britannica articles, as well as others drawn from the Britannica Student Encyclopædia, and the Britannica Elementary Encyclopædia. The package includes a range of supplementary content including maps, videos, sound clips, animations and web links. It also offers study tools and dictionary and thesaurus entries from Merriam-Webster.

Britannica Online is a website with more than 120,000 articles and is updated regularly. It has daily features, updates and links to news reports from The New York Times and the BBC. As of 2009, roughly 60% of Encyclopædia Britannica's revenue came from online operations, of which around 15% came from subscriptions to the consumer version of the websites. As of 2006, subscriptions were available on a yearly, monthly or weekly basis. Special subscription plans are offered to schools, colleges and libraries; such institutional subscribers constitute an important part of Britannica's business. Beginning in early 2007, the Britannica made articles freely available if they are hyperlinked from an external site. Non-subscribers are served pop-ups and advertising.

On 20 February 2007, Encyclopædia Britannica, Inc. announced that it was working with mobile phone search company AskMeNow to launch a mobile encyclopaedia. Users would be able to send a question via text message, and AskMeNow would search Britannica's 28,000-article concise encyclopaedia to return an answer to the query. Daily topical features sent directly to users' mobile phones were also planned.

On 3 June 2008, an initiative to facilitate collaboration between online expert and amateur scholarly contributors for Britannica's online content (in the spirit of a wiki), with editorial oversight from Britannica staff, was announced. Approved contributions would be credited, though contributing automatically grants Encyclopædia Britannica, Inc. perpetual, irrevocable licence to those contributions.

On 22 January 2009, Britannica's president, Jorge Cauz, announced that the company would be accepting edits and additions to the online Britannica website from the public. The published edition of the encyclopaedia would not be affected by the changes. Individuals wishing to edit the Britannica website would have to register under their real name and address prior to editing or submitting their content. All edits submitted would be reviewed and checked and will have to be approved by the encyclopaedia's professional staff. Contributions from non-academic users would sit in a separate section from the expert-generated Britannica content, as would content submitted by non-Britannica scholars. Articles written by users, if vetted and approved, would also only be available in a special section of the website, separate from the professional articles. Official Britannica material would carry a "Britannica Checked" stamp, to distinguish it from the user-generated content.

On 14 September 2010, Encyclopædia Britannica, Inc. announced a partnership with mobile phone development company Concentric Sky to launch a series of iPhone products aimed at the K–12 market. On 20 July 2011, Encyclopædia Britannica, Inc. announced that Concentric Sky had ported the Britannica Kids product line to Intel's Intel Atom-based Netbooks and on 26 October 2011 that it had launched its encyclopaedia as an iPad app. In 2010, Britannica released Britannica ImageQuest, a database of images.

In March 2012, it was announced that the company would cease printing the encyclopaedia set, and that it would focus on its online version.

On 7 June 2018, Britannica released a Google Chrome extension, "Britannica Insights", which shows snippets of information from Britannica Online whenever the user performs a Google Search, in a box to the right of Google's results. Britannica Insights was also available as a Firefox extension but this was taken down due to a code review issue.

== Personnel and management ==
=== Contributors ===
The print version of the Britannica has 4,411 contributors, many eminent in their fields, such as Nobel laureate economist Milton Friedman, astronomer Carl Sagan, and surgeon Michael DeBakey. Roughly a quarter of the contributors are deceased, some as long ago as 1947 (Alfred North Whitehead), while another quarter are retired or emeritus. Most (approximately 98%) contribute to only a single article; however, 64 contributed to three articles, 23 contributed to four articles, 10 contributed to five articles, and 8 contributed to more than five articles. An exceptionally prolific contributor is Christine Sutton of the University of Oxford, who contributed 24 articles on particle physics.

While Britannica's authors have included writers such as Albert Einstein, Marie Curie, and Leon Trotsky, as well as notable independent encyclopaedists such as Isaac Asimov, some have been criticized for lack of expertise. In 1911, the historian George L. Burr wrote:

With a temerity almost appalling, [the Britannica contributor, Mr. Philips] ranges over nearly the whole field of European history, political, social, ecclesiastical... The grievance is that [this work] lacks authority. This, too—this reliance on editorial energy instead of on ripe special learning—may, alas, be also counted an "Americanizing": for certainly nothing has so cheapened the scholarship of our American encyclopaedias.

=== Staff ===
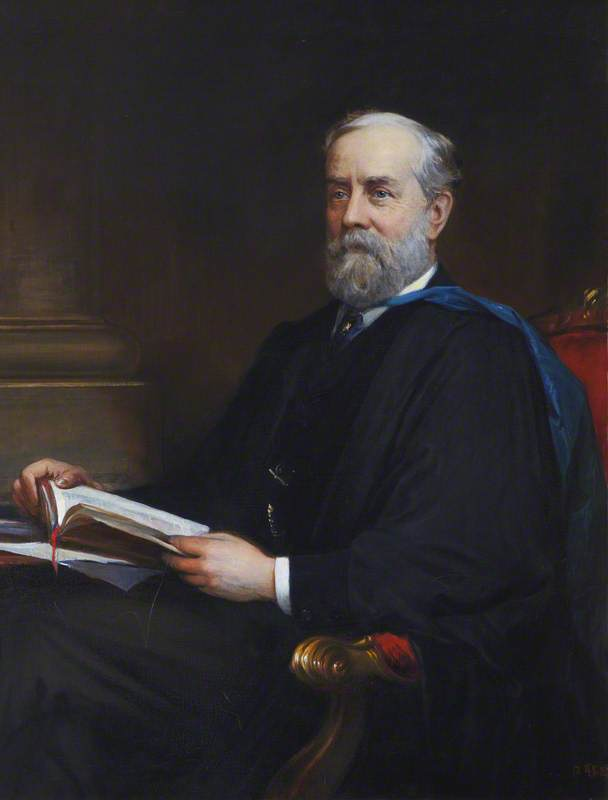
Thomas Spencer Baynes, editor of the 9th edition. This portrait, painted in 1888, hangs in the Senate Room of the University of St Andrews.

As of 2007, in the 15th edition of Britannica, Dale Hoiberg, a sinologist, was listed as Britannica's Senior Vice President and editor-in-chief. Among his predecessors as editors-in-chief were Hugh Chisholm (1902–1924), James Louis Garvin (1926–1932), Franklin Henry Hooper (1932–1938), Walter Yust (1938–1960), Harry Ashmore (1960–1963), Warren E. Preece (1964–1968, 1969–1975), Sir William Haley (1968–1969), Philip W. Goetz (1979–1991), and Robert McHenry (1992–1997).

As of 2007 Anita Wolff was listed as the Deputy Editor and Theodore Pappas as Executive Editor. Prior Executive Editors include John V. Dodge (1950–1964) and Philip W. Goetz.

Paul T. Armstrong remains the longest working employee of Encyclopædia Britannica. He began his career there in 1934, eventually earning the positions of treasurer, vice president, and chief financial officer in his 58 years with the company, before retiring in 1992.

The 2007 editorial staff of the Britannica included five Senior Editors and nine Associate Editors, supervised by Dale Hoiberg and four others. The editorial staff helped to write the articles of the Micropædia and some sections of the Macropædia.

=== Editorial advisors ===
As of 2012, Britannica had an editorial board of advisors, which included a number of distinguished figures, primarily scholars from a variety of disciplines.

The Propædia and its Outline of Knowledge were produced by dozens of editorial advisors under the direction of Mortimer J. Adler. Roughly half of these advisors have since died, including some of the Outline's chief architects – Rene Dubos (d. 1982), Loren Eiseley (d. 1977), Harold D. Lasswell (d. 1978), Mark Van Doren (d. 1972), Peter Ritchie Calder (d. 1982) and Mortimer J. Adler (d. 2001). The Propædia also lists just under 4,000 advisors who were consulted for the unsigned Micropædia articles.

=== Corporate structure ===
During much of the 20th century, the Britannica had a significant ownership stake from the University of Chicago, with many people associated with the university serving senior positions in the organization.^{331-332} During the mid-20th century, managers and executives at the Britannica company were lavishly rewarded due to the healthy profit encyclopaedia sales generated, with division managers at the top of the sales organization earning an average salary of $125,000 in 1958 (adjusting for inflation, some $1,394,896 in current USD).^{329}

From 1974, the company was controlled by the Benton Foundation, of which the University of Chicago was the sole beneficiary. In January 1996, the Britannica was purchased from the Benton Foundation by billionaire Swiss financier Jacqui Safra, who serves as its current chair of the board. In 1997, Don Yannias, a long-time associate and investment advisor of Safra, became CEO of Encyclopædia Britannica, Inc.

In 1999, a new subsidiary company, Britannica.com Incorporated, was created to develop digital versions of the Britannica; Yannias assumed the role of CEO in the new company, while his former position at the parent company remained vacant for two years. Yannias' tenure at Britannica.com Incorporated was marked by missteps, considerable lay-offs, and financial losses. In 2001, Yannias was replaced by Ilan Yeshua, who reunited the leadership of the two companies. Yannias later returned to investment management, but remains on Encyclopædia Britannica, Inc's Board of Directors.

In 2003, former management consultant Jorge Aguilar-Cauz was appointed President of Encyclopædia Britannica, Inc. Cauz is the senior executive and reports directly to the Britannica's Board of Directors. Cauz has been pursuing alliances with other companies and extending the Britannica brand to new educational and reference products, continuing the strategy pioneered by former CEO Elkan Harrison Powell in the mid-1930s.

=== Sales and marketing ===
Although prior to 1920 the Britannica was primarily sold by mail-order, after that time the Britannica was almost exclusively sold by door-to-door salesmen, who often used high-pressure sales tactics or outright deception in order to secure purchases of the expensive work,^{317-330} from which they gained a significant commission. This commission in the United States in 1971 was $120–200 (around $954-$1590, adjusted for inflation) per sale. These high-pressure sales tactics resulted in high levels of turnover among Britannica salesmen, with the company often exaggerating the ease of making a sale to employees, as well as engaging in deceptive job advertising in order to entice people to become salesmen.^{317-330} The Britannica was sued several times by the American Federal Trade Commission for deceptive practices.^{317-330} These practices were common among American encyclopaedia companies.^{317-330} The development of the significant sales force began in 1932, with most senior leadership of the company by the late 20th century coming from the sales division.

While early on the Britannica was marketed to adults, and in particular during the 19th and early 20th centuries, to an elite educated audience,^{152-153} by the mid-20th century, the Britannica (as well as other American encyclopaedias) were primarily marketed to middle-class parents who wished to seek a good education for their children, despite the text not being aimed at a child's reading level.^{317-330} During the 20th century, the Britannica differentiated itself from other encyclopaedias by using its long pedigree to present itself as a premium brand. Once the encyclopaedia was purchased, it was typically only opened a few times a year by an average owner.

== Competition ==
As the Britannica is a general encyclopaedia, it does not seek to compete with specialized encyclopaedias such as the Encyclopaedia of Mathematics or the Dictionary of the Middle Ages, which can devote much more space to their chosen topics. In its first years, the Britannica's main competitor was the general encyclopaedia of Ephraim Chambers and, soon thereafter, Rees's Cyclopædia and Coleridge's Encyclopædia Metropolitana. In the 20th century, successful competitors included Collier's Encyclopedia, the Encyclopedia Americana, and the World Book Encyclopedia. Nevertheless, from the 9th edition onwards, the Britannica was widely considered to have the greatest authority of any general English-language encyclopaedia, especially because of its broad coverage and eminent authors. The print version of the Britannica was also thus significantly more expensive than its competitors.

Since the early 1990s, the Britannica has faced new challenges from digital information sources. The Internet, facilitated by the development of search engines, has grown into a common source of information for many people, and provides easy access to reliable original sources and expert opinions, thanks in part to initiatives such as Google Books, MIT's release of its educational materials and the open PubMed Central library of the National Library of Medicine.

The Internet tends to provide more current coverage than print media, due to the ease with which material on the Internet can be updated and then made available to users. In rapidly changing fields such as science, technology, politics, culture, and modern history, the Britannica has struggled to stay up to date, a problem first analysed systematically by its former editor Walter Yust. Eventually, the Britannica turned to focus more on its online edition.

=== Print encyclopaedias ===
The Encyclopædia Britannica has been compared with other print encyclopaedias, both qualitatively and quantitatively. A well-known comparison is that of Kenneth Kister, who gave a qualitative and quantitative comparison of the 1993 Britannica with two comparable encyclopaedias, Collier's Encyclopedia and the Encyclopedia Americana. For the quantitative analysis, ten articles were selected at random—circumcision, Charles Drew, Galileo, Philip Glass, heart disease, IQ, panda bear, sexual harassment, Shroud of Turin and Uzbekistan—and letter grades of A–D or F were awarded in four categories: coverage, accuracy, clarity, and recency. In all four categories and for all three encyclopaedias, the four average grades fell between B− and B+, chiefly because none of the encyclopaedias had an article on sexual harassment in 1994. In the accuracy category, the Britannica received one "D" and seven "A"s, Encyclopedia Americana received eight "A"s, and Collier's received one "D" and seven "A"s; thus, Britannica received an average score of 92% for accuracy to Americana's 95% and Collier's 92%. In the timeliness category, Britannica averaged an 86% to Americana's 90% and Collier's 85%.

=== Digital encyclopaedias on optical media ===
The most notable competitor of the Britannica among CD/DVD-ROM digital encyclopaedias was Encarta, now discontinued, a modern multimedia encyclopaedia that incorporated three print encyclopaedias: Funk & Wagnalls, Collier's, and the New Merit Scholar's Encyclopedia. Encarta was the top-selling multimedia encyclopaedia, based on total US retail sales from January 2000 to February 2006. Both occupied the same price range, with the 2007 Encyclopædia Britannica Ultimate CD or DVD costing US$40–50 and the Microsoft Encarta Premium 2007 DVD costing US$45.

The Britannica disc contains 100,000 articles and Merriam-Webster's Dictionary and Thesaurus (US only) and offers primary and secondary school editions. Encarta contained 66,000 articles, a user-friendly Visual Browser, interactive maps, math, language, and homework tools, a US and UK dictionary, and a youth edition. Like Encarta, the digital Britannica has been criticized for being biased towards United States audiences; the United Kingdom-related articles are updated less often, maps of the United States are more detailed than those of other countries, and it lacks a UK dictionary. Like the Britannica, Encarta was available online by subscription, although some content could be accessed for free.

=== Wikipedia ===
The main online alternative to Britannica is Wikipedia. The key differences between the two lie in accessibility; the model of participation they bring to an encyclopaedic project; their respective style sheets and editorial policies; relative ages; the number of subjects treated; the number of languages in which articles are written and made available; and their underlying economic models: unlike Britannica, Wikipedia is not-for-profit, does not carry advertising on its site, and is not connected with traditional profit- and contract-based publishing distribution networks.

Britannica's articles either have known authorship or a set of possible authors (the editorial staff). With the exception of the editorial staff, most Britannica's contributors are experts in their field—some are Nobel laureates. By contrast, the articles on Wikipedia are written by people of unknown degrees of expertise; most do not claim any particular expertise, and of those who do, many are anonymous and have no verifiable credentials. It is for this lack of institutional vetting or certification that former Britannica editor-in-chief Robert McHenry noted his belief in 2004 that Wikipedia could not hope to rival the Britannica in accuracy.

In 2005, the journal Nature chose articles from both websites in a wide range of science topics and sent them to what it called "relevant" field experts for peer review. The experts then compared the competing articles—one from each site on a given topic—side by side, but were not told which article came from which site. Nature got back 42 usable reviews. The journal found just eight serious errors, such as general misunderstandings of vital concepts: four from each site. It also discovered many factual errors, omissions or misleading statements: 162 in Wikipedia and 123 in Britannica, an average of 3.86 mistakes per article for Wikipedia and 2.92 for Britannica.

Although Britannica was revealed as the more accurate encyclopaedia, with fewer errors, in its rebuttal, it called Nature's study flawed and misleading and called for a "prompt" retraction. It noted that two of the articles in the study were taken from a Britannica yearbook and not the encyclopaedia, and another two were from Compton's Encyclopedia (called the Britannica Student Encyclopedia on the company's website).

Nature defended its story and declined to retract, stating that, as it was comparing Wikipedia with the web version of Britannica, it used whatever relevant material was available on Britannica's website. Interviewed in February 2009, the managing director of Britannica UK said:

Wikipedia is a fun site to use and has a lot of interesting entries on there, but their approach wouldn't work for Encyclopædia Britannica. My job is to create more awareness of our very different approaches to publishing in the public mind. They're a chisel, we're a drill, and you need to have the correct tool for the job.

For the 15th anniversary of Wikipedia, the Telegraph published two opinion pieces which compared Wikipedia to Britannica and falsely claimed that Britannica had gone bankrupt in 1996. In a January 2016 press release, Britannica responded by calling Wikipedia "an impressive achievement" but argued that critics should avoid "false comparisons" to Britannica in terms of differing models and purposes.

== Critical and popular assessments ==
=== Reputation ===
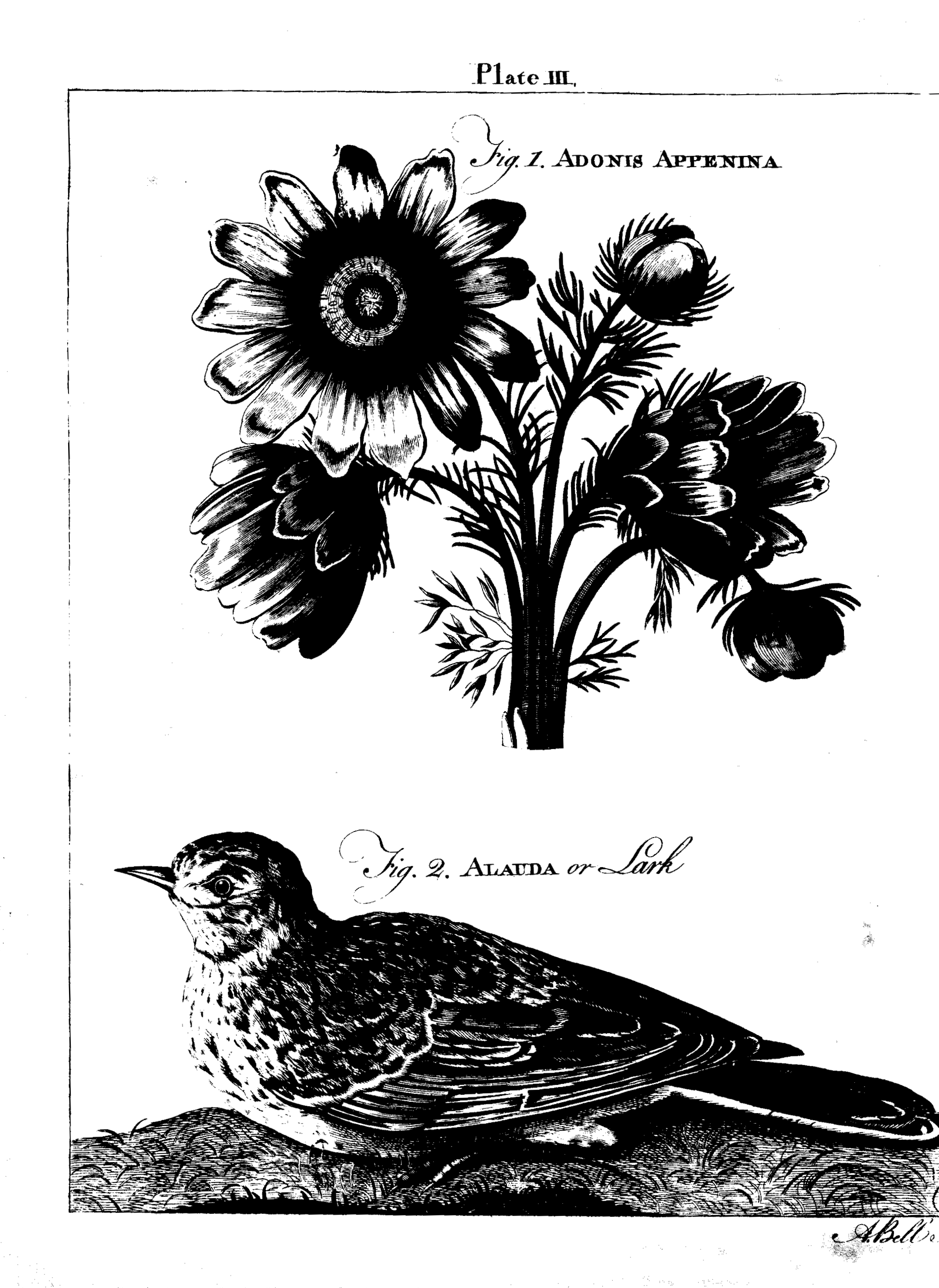
A copperplate by Andrew Bell from the 1st edition

Since the 3rd edition, the Britannica has enjoyed a popular and critical reputation for general excellence, though this reputation has not been without its critics. The 3rd and 9th editions were pirated for sale in the United States, beginning with Dobson's Encyclopædia. On the release of the 14th edition, Time magazine dubbed the Britannica the "Patriarch of the Library". In a related advertisement, naturalist William Beebe was quoted as saying that the Britannica was "beyond comparison because there is no competitor". References to the Britannica can be found throughout English literature, most notably in one of Sir Arthur Conan Doyle's favourite Sherlock Holmes stories, "The Red-Headed League". The tale was highlighted by the Lord Mayor of London, Gilbert Inglefield, at the bicentennial of the Britannica.

The Britannica has a reputation for summarizing knowledge. To further their education, some people have devoted themselves to reading the entire Britannica, taking anywhere from three to 22 years to do so. When Fat'h Ali became the Shah of Persia in 1797, he was given a set of the Britannica's 3rd edition; after reading the complete set, he extended his royal title to include "Most Formidable Lord and Master of the Encyclopædia Britannica".

Writer George Bernard Shaw has claimed to have read the complete 9th edition, except for the science articles; Richard Evelyn Byrd took the Britannica as reading material for his five-month stay at the South Pole in 1934; and Philip Beaver read it during a sailing expedition. More recently, A. J. Jacobs, an editor at Esquire magazine, read the entire 2002 version of the 15th edition, describing his experiences in the well-received 2004 book The Know-It-All: One Man's Humble Quest to Become the Smartest Person in the World. Only two people are known to have read two independent editions: the author C. S. Forester and Amos Urban Shirk, an American businessman who read the 11th and 14th editions, devoting roughly three hours per night for four and a half years to read the 11th.

=== Awards ===
The CD/DVD-ROM version of the Britannica, Encyclopædia Britannica Ultimate Reference Suite, received the 2004 Distinguished Achievement Award from the Association of Educational Publishers. On 15 July 2009, Encyclopædia Britannica was awarded a spot as one of "Top Ten Superbrands in the UK" by a panel of more than 2,000 independent reviewers, as reported by the BBC.

=== Coverage of topics ===
Topics are chosen in part by reference to the Propædia "Outline of Knowledge". The bulk of the 15th edition of the Britannica is devoted to geography (26% of the Macropædia), biography (14%), biology and medicine (11%), literature (7%), physics and astronomy (6%), religion (5%), art (4%), Western philosophy (4%), and law (3%). A complementary study of the Micropædia found that geography accounted for 25% of articles, science 18%, social sciences 17%, biography 17%, and all other humanities 25%. Writing in 1992, one reviewer judged that the "range, depth, and catholicity of coverage [of the Britannica] are unsurpassed by any other general Encyclopaedia."

The Britannica does not cover topics in equal detail; for example, the whole of Buddhism and most other religions is covered in a single Macropædia article, whereas 14 articles are devoted to Christianity, comprising nearly half of all religion articles. The Britannica covers 50,479 biographies, 5,999 of them about women, with 11.87% being British citizens and 25.51% US citizens. However, the Britannica has been lauded as the least biased of general Encyclopaedias marketed to Western readers and praised for its biographies of important women of all eras.

It can be stated without fear of contradiction that the 15th edition of the Britannica accords non-Western cultural, social, and scientific developments more notice than any general English-language encyclopedia currently on the market.

— Kenneth Kister, in Kister's Best Encyclopedias (1994)

=== Criticism of editorial decisions ===
Harvey Einbinder in the Myth of the Britannica criticized the 11th edition for the inaccessibility of the text for laymen, saying that many of its articles were too technical for people unfamiliar to the subject to understand.^{152-153} He made similar criticisms of many of the mathematics and science articles of the then-current 14th edition.^{236-250}

On rare occasions, the Britannica has been criticized for its editorial choices. Given its roughly constant size, the encyclopaedia has needed to reduce or eliminate some topics to accommodate others, resulting in controversial decisions. The initial 15th edition (1974–1985) was faulted for having reduced or eliminated coverage of children's literature, military decorations, and the French poet Joachim du Bellay; editorial mistakes were also alleged, such as inconsistent sorting of Japanese biographies. Its elimination of the index was condemned, as was the apparently arbitrary division of articles into the Micropædia and Macropædia. Summing up, one critic called the initial 15th edition a "qualified failure ... [that] cares more for juggling its format than for preserving." More recently, reviewers from the American Library Association were surprised to find that most educational articles had been eliminated from the 1992 Macropædia, along with the article on psychology. Harvey Einbinder in The Myth of the Britannica criticized the practice of condensing entries in the 14th edition, which usually involved simply removing large amounts of the text rather than attempting to condense it by rewriting, resulting in what he considered to be considerable reduction in the quality of the articles.^{151-168}

Some very few Britannica-appointed contributors are mistaken. A notorious instance from the Britannica's early years is the rejection of Newtonian gravity by George Gleig, the chief editor of the 3rd edition (1788–1797), who wrote that gravity was caused by the classical element of fire. The Britannica has also staunchly defended a scientific approach to cultural topics, as it did with William Robertson Smith's articles on religion in the 9th edition, particularly his article stating that the Bible was not historically accurate (1875).

=== Other criticisms ===
The Britannica has received criticism, particularly as editions become outdated. It is expensive to produce a completely new edition of the Britannica, (Note: According to Kister, the initial 15th edition (1974) required over $32 million to produce.) and its editors delay for as long as fiscally sensible (usually about 25 years).

For example, despite continuous revision, the 14th edition became outdated after 35 years (1929–1964). When American physicist Harvey Einbinder detailed its failings in his 1964 book, The Myth of the Britannica, the encyclopaedia was provoked to produce the 15th edition, which required 10 years of work. Editors have struggled at times to keep the Britannica current: one 1994 critic writes, "It is not difficult to find articles that are out-of-date or in need of revision", noting that the longer Macropædia articles are more likely to be outdated than the shorter Micropædia articles. Information in the Micropædia is sometimes inconsistent with the corresponding Macropædia article(s), mainly because of the failure to update one or the other. The bibliographies of the Macropædia articles have been criticized for being more out-of-date than the articles themselves.

In 2005, a 12-year-old schoolboy in Britain found several inaccuracies in the Britannica's entries on Poland and wildlife in Eastern Europe. In 2010, an entry about the Irish Civil War, which incorrectly described it as having been fought between the north and south of Ireland, was discussed in the Irish press following a decision by the Department of Education and Science to pay for online access.

Writing about the 3rd edition (1788–1797), Britannica's chief editor George Gleig observed that "perfection seems to be incompatible with the nature of works constructed on such a plan and embracing such a variety of subjects." In March 2006, the Britannica wrote, "we in no way mean to imply that Britannica is error-free; we have never made such a claim". However, the Britannica sales department had previously made a well-known claim in 1962 regarding the 14th edition that "[i]t is truth. It is unquestionable fact." The sentiment of the 2006 statement was also reflected in the introduction to the first edition of the Britannica, written by its original editor William Smellie:

With regard to errors in general, whether falling under the denomination of mental, typographical or accidental, we are conscious of being able to point out a greater number than any critic whatever. Men who are acquainted with the innumerable difficulties attending the execution of a work of such an extensive nature will make proper allowances. To these we appeal, and shall rest satisfied with the judgment they pronounce.

== Edition summary ==
Overview of editions of Encyclopædia Britannica
Edition / supplement	Publication years	Size	Sales	Chief editor(s)	Notes
1st	1768–1771	3 volumes, 2,391 pages, (Note: Vol. I has (viii), 697, (i) pages, but 10 unpaginated pages are added between pages 586 and 587. Vol. II has (iii), 1009, (ii) pages, but page numbers 175–176 as well as page numbers 425–426 were used twice; additionally page numbers 311–410 were not used. Vol. III has (iii), 953, (i) pages, but page numbers 679–878 were not used.) 160 plates	3,000 (Note: Archibald Constable estimated in 1812 that there had been 3,500 copies printed, but revised his estimate to 3,000 in 1821.)	William Smellie	Largely the work of one editor, Smellie; An estimated 3,000 sets were eventually sold, priced at £12 apiece; 30 articles longer than three pages. The pages were bound in three equally sized volumes covering Aa–Bzo, Caaba–Lythrum, and Macao–Zyglophyllum.
2nd	1777–1784	10 volumes, 8,595 pages, 340 plates	1,500	James Tytler	Largely the work of one editor, Tytler; 150 long articles; pagination errors; all maps under "Geography" article; 1,500 sets sold
3rd	1788–1797	18 volumes, 14,579 pages, 542 plates	10,000 or 13,000 (Note: According to Smellie, it was 10,000, as quoted by Robert Kerr in his "Memoirs of William Smellie." Archibald Constable was quoted as saying the production started at 5,000 and concluded at 13,000.)	Colin Macfarquhar and George Gleig	£42,000 profit on 10,000 copies sold; first dedication to monarch; pirated by Moore in Dublin and Thomas Dobson in Philadelphia
supplement to 3rd	1801, revised in 1803	2 volumes, 1,624 pages, 50 plates		George Gleig	Copyright owned by Thomas Bonar
4th	1801–1810	20 volumes, 16,033 pages, 581 plates	4,000	James Millar	Authors first allowed to retain copyright. Material in the supplement to 3rd not incorporated due to copyright issues.
5th	1815–1817	20 volumes, 16,017 pages, 582 plates		James Millar	Reprint of the 4th edition. Financial losses by Millar and Andrew Bell's heirs; EB rights sold to Archibald Constable
supplement to 4th, 5th, and 6th	1816–1824	6 volumes, 4,933 pages, 125 plates^{1}	10,500	Macvey Napier	Famous contributors recruited, such as Sir Humphry Davy, Sir Walter Scott, Malthus
6th	1820–1823	20 volumes		Charles Maclaren	Reprint of the 4th and 5th editions with modern font. Constable went bankrupt on 19 January 1826; EB rights eventually secured by Adam Black
7th	1830–1842	21 volumes, 17,101 pages, 506 plates, plus a 187-page index volume	5,000	Macvey Napier, assisted by James Browne, LLD	Widening network of famous contributors, such as Sir David Brewster, Thomas de Quincey, Antonio Panizzi; 5,000 sets sold
8th	1853–1860	21 volumes, 17,957 pages, 402 plates; plus a 239-page index volume, published 1861^{2}	8,000	Thomas Stewart Traill	Many long articles were copied from the 7th edition; 344 contributors including William Thomson; authorized American sets printed by Little, Brown in Boston; 8,000 sets sold altogether
9th	1875–1889	24 volumes, plus a 499-page index volume labeled Volume 25	55,000 authorized (Note: 10,000 sets sold by Britannica plus 45,000 genuine American reprints by Scribner's Sons, and "several hundred thousand sets of mutilated and fraudulent 9th editions were sold..." Most sources estimate there were 500,000 pirated sets.) plus 500,000 pirated sets	Thomas Spencer Baynes (1875–80); then W. Robertson Smith	Some carry-over from 8th edition, but mostly a new work; high point of scholarship; 10,000 sets sold by Britannica and 45,000 authorized sets made in the US by Little, Brown in Boston and Schribners' Sons in NY, but pirated widely (500,000 sets) in the US.^{3}
10th, supplement to 9th	1902–1903	11 volumes, plus the 24 volumes of the 9th. Volume 34 containing 124 detailed country maps with index of 250,000 names^{4}	70,000	Sir Donald Mackenzie Wallace and Hugh Chisholm in London; Arthur T. Hadley and Franklin Henry Hooper in New York City	American partnership bought EB rights on 9 May 1901; high-pressure sales methods
11th	1910–1911	28 volumes, plus volume 29 index	1,000,000	Hugh Chisholm in London, Franklin Henry Hooper in New York City	Another high point of scholarship and writing; more articles than the 9th, but shorter and simpler; financial difficulties for owner, Horace Everett Hooper; EB rights sold to Sears Roebuck in 1920
12th, supplement to 11th	1921–1922	3 volumes with own index, plus the 29 volumes of the 11th^{5}		Hugh Chisholm in London, Franklin Henry Hooper in New York City	Summarized state of the world before, during, and after World War I
13th, supplement to 11th	1926	3 volumes with own index, plus the 29 volumes of the 11th^{6}		James Louis Garvin in London, Franklin Henry Hooper in New York City	Replaced 12th edition volumes; improved perspective of the events of 1910–1926
14th	1929–1933	24 volumes^{7}		James Louis Garvin in London, Franklin Henry Hooper in New York City	Publication just before Great Depression was financially catastrophic
revised 14th	1933–1973	24 volumes^{7}		Franklin Henry Hooper until 1938; then Walter Yust, Harry Ashmore, Warren E. Preece, William Haley	Began continuous revision in 1936: every article revised at least twice every decade
15th	1974–1984	30 volumes^{8}		Warren E. Preece, then Philip W. Goetz	Introduced three-part structure; division of articles into Micropædia and Macropædia; Propædia Outline of Knowledge; separate index eliminated
15th	1985–2010	32 volumes^{9}		Philip W. Goetz, then Robert McHenry, currently Dale Hoiberg	Restored two-volume index; some Micropædia and Macropædia articles merged; slightly longer overall; new versions were issued every few years. This edition is the last printed edition.
Global	2009	30 compact volumes		Dale Hoiberg	Unlike the 15th edition, it did not contain Macro- and Micropedia sections, but ran A through Z as all editions up to the 14th had.

Edition notes

^{1}"Supplement to the fourth, fifth, and sixth editions of the Encyclopædia Britannica. With preliminary dissertations on the history of the sciences."

^{2} The 7th to 14th editions included a separate index volume.

^{3} The 9th edition featured articles by notables of the day, such as James Clerk Maxwell on electricity and magnetism, and William Thomson (who became Lord Kelvin) on heat.

^{4} The 10th edition included a maps volume and a cumulative index volume for the 9th and 10th edition volumes: the new volumes, constituting, in combination with the existing volumes of the 9th ed., the 10th ed. ... and also supplying a new, distinctive, and independent library of reference dealing with recent events and developments

^{5} "Vols. 30–32 ... the New volumes constituting, in combination with the twenty-nine volumes of the eleventh edition, the twelfth edition"

^{6} This supplement replaced the previous supplement: The three new supplementary volumes constituting, with the volumes of the latest standard edition, the thirteenth edition.

^{7} At this point Encyclopædia Britannica began almost annual revisions. New revisions of the 14th edition appeared every year between 1929 and 1973 with the exceptions of 1931, 1934 and 1935.

^{8} Annual revisions were published every year between 1974 and 2007 with the exceptions of 1996, 1999, 2000, 2004 and 2006. The 15th edition (introduced as "Britannica 3") was published in three parts: a 10-volume Micropædia (which contained short articles and served as an index), a 19-volume Macropædia, plus the Propædia (see text).

^{9} In 1985, the system was modified by adding a separate two-volume index; the Macropædia articles were further consolidated into fewer, larger ones (for example, the previously separate articles about the 50 US states were all included into the "United States of America" article), with some medium-length articles moved to the Micropædia. The Micropædia had 12 vols. and the Macropædia 17.

The first CD-ROM edition was issued in 1994. At that time also an online version was offered for paid subscription. In 1999 the online version was offered free, and no revised print versions appeared. In 2001 the free online version was eliminated and a new printed set was issued.

== See also ==
- Encyclopædia Britannica Films
- Great Books of the Western World
- List of encyclopedias by branch of knowledge
- List of encyclopedias by date
- List of encyclopedias by language § English
- List of online encyclopedias
