= List of contributors to the Encyclopædia Britannica =

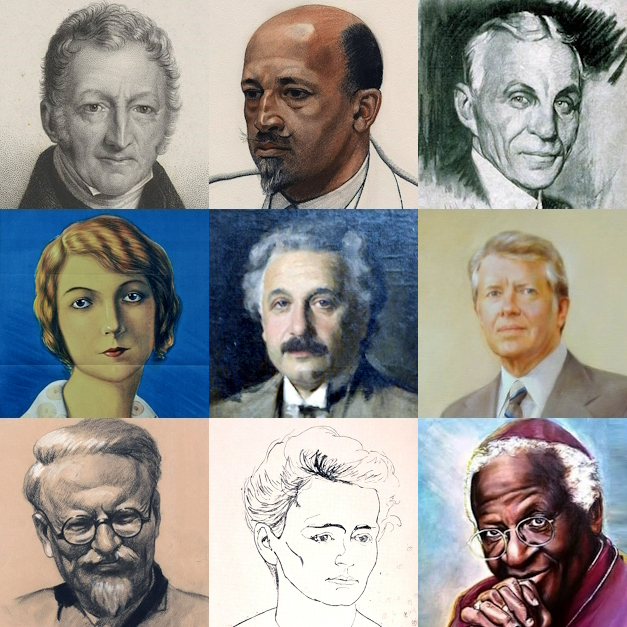
Collage of famous contributors to the Britannica (clockwise from top left): Thomas Malthus, W.E.B. Du Bois, Henry Ford, Jimmy Carter, Desmond Tutu, Marie Curie, Leon Trotsky, Lillian Gish, Albert Einstein

The Encyclopædia Britannica has a history of containing many articles written by notable expert contributors, Among these contributors are many Nobel laureates, such as Albert Einstein and Marie Curie; presidents of the United States John F. Kennedy, Jimmy Carter, and Bill Clinton; and other notable figures.

== Contributors ==
Edition	Name	Description of author	Contributions
1st	William Smellie	Scottish printer, author and principal editor of the first edition of the Britannica	Various (Note: Smellie compiled most of the material for the first edition, and is known to have written original articles himself, but authorship of most articles is anonymous. Smellie also often copied directly from other sources.)
2nd	James Tytler	Scottish balloonist, radical, author, and editor of the second edition and part of the third edition	Various, (Note: Tytler wrote the vast majority of the articles of the second edition. He also updated and reprinted some of Smellie's contributions.) notably: "Astronomy"; "Botany"; "Chemistry"; "Medicine"
3rd	James Tytler	Scottish balloonist, radical, author, and editor of the second edition and part of the third edition	Various, notably: "Astronomy"; "Botany"; "Chemistry"; "Medicine"
3rd	John Barclay	Scottish anatomist and teacher	"Physiology"
3rd	Thomas Blacklock	Blind Scottish poet and clergyman	"Blind"
3rd	David Doig	Scottish philologist	"Mysteries"; "Mythology"; "Philology"
3rd	George Gleig	Scottish bishop and primus of the Scottish Episcopal Church, editor of part of the third edition	Various, notably: "Instinct"; "Metaphysics"; "Theology"
3rd	Robert Heron	Scottish writer and polymath	"Education"; "Religion"; "Society"
3rd	John Robison	Scottish natural philosopher	Various, notably: "Steam"; "Steam-engine"
3rd	Thomas Thomson	Scottish chemist	"Sea"
4th, 5th, 6th, suppl.	Thomas Robert Malthus	English demographer and political economist known for the Malthusian theory of population growth	"Population"
11th	Peter Kropotkin	Russian anarcho-communist philosopher	Various, (Note: Kropotkin had contributed before to the 9th and 10th editions.) notably: "Anarchism"
13th	Marie Curie	Polish scientist who made breakthroughs in physics and chemistry, earning two Nobel Prizes	"Radium"
13th	Irène Joliot-Curie	Daughter of Marie and 1935 Nobel laureate in Chemistry	"Radium"
13th	W.E.B. Du Bois	African American sociologist and co-founder of the NAACP	"Negro literature" in American literature
13th	Albert Einstein	German-born physicist and 1921 Nobel laureate in Physics	"Space-time"
13th	Henry Ford	American automobile manufacturer and innovator of mass production who founded Ford Motor Company	"Mass production"
13th	Sigmund Freud	Neurologist who originated Psychoanalysis	Psychoanalysis: Freudian School
13th	Leon Trotsky	Russian revolutionary leader and statesman	"Lenin, Vladimir Ilyich Ulyanov"
14th	Lillian Gish	Prolific American silent film actress	"A universal language" in Motion pictures
14th	John F. Kennedy	President of the United States from 1961 to 1963	"Ellsworth, Oliver"
15th	Jimmy Carter	President of the United States from 1977 to 1981	"Camp David Accords"
Online	Bill Clinton	President of the United States from 1993 to 2001	"Dayton Accords"
Online	Desmond Tutu	South African archbishop and 1984 Nobel Peace Prize laureate	"Truth and Reconciliation Commission, South Africa"
