= Jorge Cauz =

American entrepreneur (1965-)

Jorge Aguilar Cauz is an American businessman and entrepreneur of Mexican descent and the former President and CEO of Encyclopædia Britannica Inc., which publishes the Encyclopædia Britannica and Merriam Webster, and owns the Israeli AI company Melingo AI. He was appointed to this position on May 11, 2021. In March 2026, Mr. Cauz left Britannica to pursue tech investments through a family office.

== Education ==
Cauz trained as an engineer at Universidad Iberoamericana in Mexico City, earning his B.S. in chemical engineering in 1985. After graduating, he worked at Rohm and Haas (now part of Dow Chemical Company). In 1989, Mr. Cauz graduated from the Kellogg Graduate School of Management of Northwestern University. Before joining Britannica, he served as a management consultant for Andersen Consulting and Kearney.

== Britannica career ==
Cauz was hired by Britannica as a consultant in 1996 and later served in a variety of executive positions (including senior vice president of international operations and chief operating officer of Internet operations) before he was appointed president. During that time, he played a key role in the company's marketing strategies, including the publication of all-digital editions of the Encyclopædia Britannica.

One of the key aspects of Cauz's tenure was the emergence of the Internet as both an opportunity and a threat in the encyclopedia business. In a 2000 interview, Cauz remarked that in an Internet-dominated market, "you have to be free to be relevant". Since his tenure, and after his decision to stop printing the encyclopedia set in 2012, Britannica succeeded in transitioning its business model into that of a digital publisher, and while its revenues decreased, Britannica improved its profitability when it became an exclusively digital publisher.

From 2018 until 2021, Cauz left the company to work in a family fund and became an advisor to Britannica and a member of the board of Israeli Britannica's subsidiary Britannica Knowledge Systems, now part of Comply365.

Since May 11, 2021, when Cauz was named Encyclopædia Britannica CEO, he has diversified the company into an educational company with significant AI initiatives ad a wide range of K-12 educational solutions, consumer educational games (under the Britannica and Merriam-Webster brands).

=== Britannica and English Wikipedia ===
During Cauz's tenure, officials from Britannica and contributors to Britannica have become outspoken in their criticism of Wikipedia, which many view as a significant competitive threat to Britannica, a threat which Cauz has downplayed. In July 2006, Cauz personally entered the fray in an interview in The New Yorker, in which he stated, via email, to writer Stacy Schiff, his view that, without editorial supervision, Wikipedia would "decline into a hulking, mediocre mass of uneven, unreliable, and... unreadable articles", and elsewhere analogizing "Wikipedia... to Britannica as American Idol is to the Juilliard School"; in the same piece, Schiff had noted, in an undated quote (apart from the piece's 2006 publication date), that Wikipedia's founder, Jimmy Wales, "has said that he would consider Britannica a competitor, 'except that I think they will be crushed out of existence within five years'."

In 2008, Cauz stressed Britannica's new efforts to participate in online collaboration in the generation of encyclopedic content, and that recognizing experts is a requirement in order to achieve objectivity and high quality.

In January 2009, Cauz criticized Google for promoting Wikipedia in its search rankings, saying "If I were to be the CEO of Google or the founders of Google I would be very [displeased] that the best search engine in the world continues to provide as a first link, Wikipedia", and then querying, "Is this the best that [their] algorithm can do?".

When Britannica announced that they would stop selling their printed encyclopedia in March 2012, Cauz said that "Britannica won't be able to be as large, but it will always be factually correct." referencing Wikipedia's larger size.

== See also ==
- Encyclopædia Britannica Eleventh Edition
