= Macropædia =

Part of the Encyclopædia Britannica covering a limited number of articles in detail

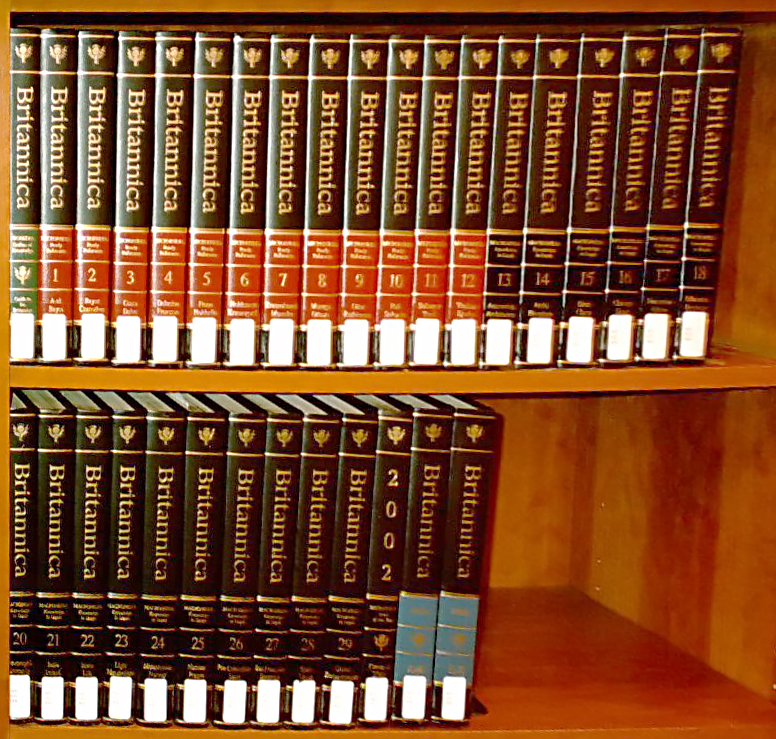
The volumes of the Encyclopædia Britannica. The Macropædia is the set of volumes 13 to 29, with single colour spines.

The 17-volume Macropædia is the third part of the Encyclopædia Britannica; the other two parts are the 12-volume Micropædia and the one-volume Propædia. The name Macropædia is a neologism coined by Mortimer J. Adler from the ancient Greek words for 'large' and 'instruction'. Adler's intention was that the Macropædia serve students who wish to learn a field in depth; for comparison, the short articles of the Micropædia are intended for quick fact-checking.

The Macropædia was introduced in the 15th edition (1974) with 19 volumes having 4,207 articles. In the drastic reorganization of that edition in 1985, these articles were combined and condensed into 17 volumes with roughly 700 articles, ranging in length from 2 to 310 pages. The longest article, on the United States, resulted from the merging of the 50 articles on each state. The articles of the Macropædia are generally written by named contributors and have references, in contrast to the roughly 65,000 articles of the Micropædia that have no named contributor and no references. However, some parts of the Macropædia were written by the editorial staff of the Britannica; such editorial articles are identified by the abbreviation "Ed."

Since its reorganization, the Macropædia has not remained constant. New articles are constantly being added, whereas older articles are sometimes split, absorbed into other articles or drastically shortened or even deleted. An example of the latter is the 1989 article "Adhesives", which had its own article of seven pages in the 1989 Macropædia but was merely a page in a different article of the 1991 edition.

== See also ==
- Encyclopædia Britannica Ultimate Reference Suite
