= Micropædia =

Part of the 15th edition of Encyclopaedia Britannica with short articles

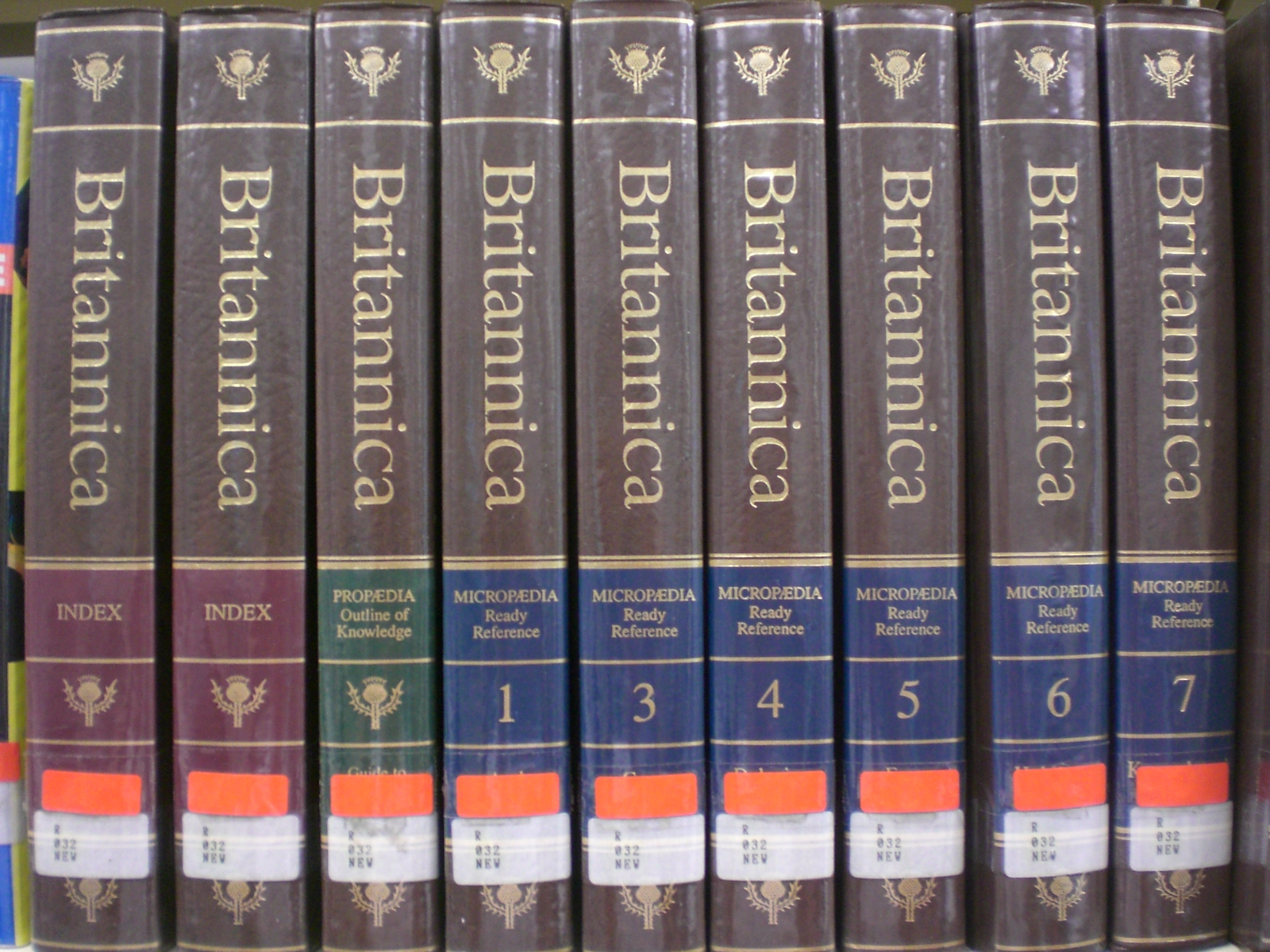
Micropædia volumes

The 12-volume Micropædia is one of the three parts of the 15th edition of Encyclopædia Britannica, the other two being the one-volume Propædia and the 17-volume Macropædia. The name Micropædia is a neologism coined by Mortimer J. Adler from the ancient Greek words for "small" and "instruction"; the best English translation is perhaps "brief lessons".

The Micropædia was introduced in 1974 with 10 volumes having 102,214 short articles, all of which were strictly fewer than 750 words. This limit was relaxed in the major re-organization of the 15th edition; many articles were condensed together, resulting in roughly 65,000 articles in 12 volumes. In general, the 750-word limit is still respected and most articles are only 1-2 paragraphs; however, a few longer articles can be found in the 2007 Micropædia, such as the Internet entry, which takes up a full page.

With rare exceptions (<3%), the ~65,000 articles of the Micropædia have no bibliographies and no named contributors. The Micropædia is intended primarily for quick fact-checking and as a guide to the 700 longer articles of the Macropædia, which do have identified authors and bibliographies.

== See also ==
- Anabritannica
- Encyclopædia Britannica Ultimate Reference Suite
