= Andrew Bell (engraver) =

Scottish engraver and printer (1726–1809)

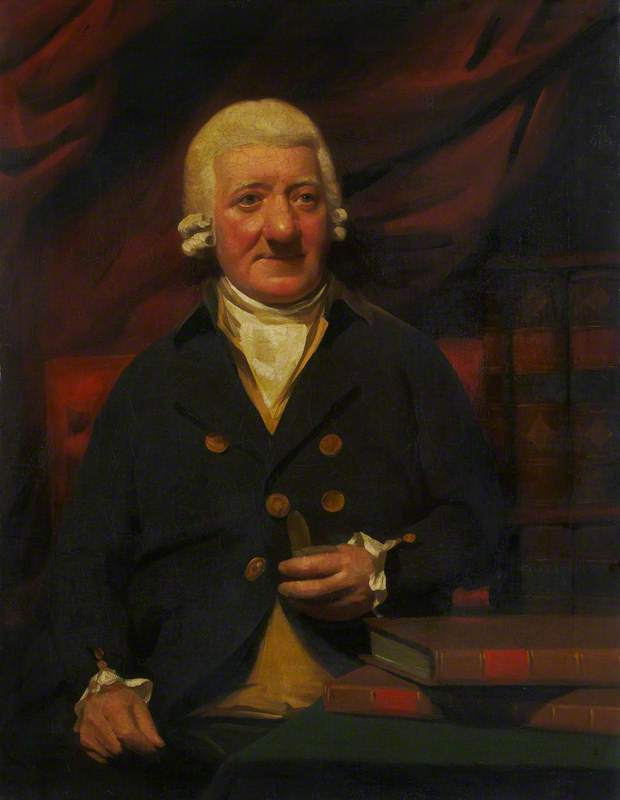
Andrew Bell by George Watson

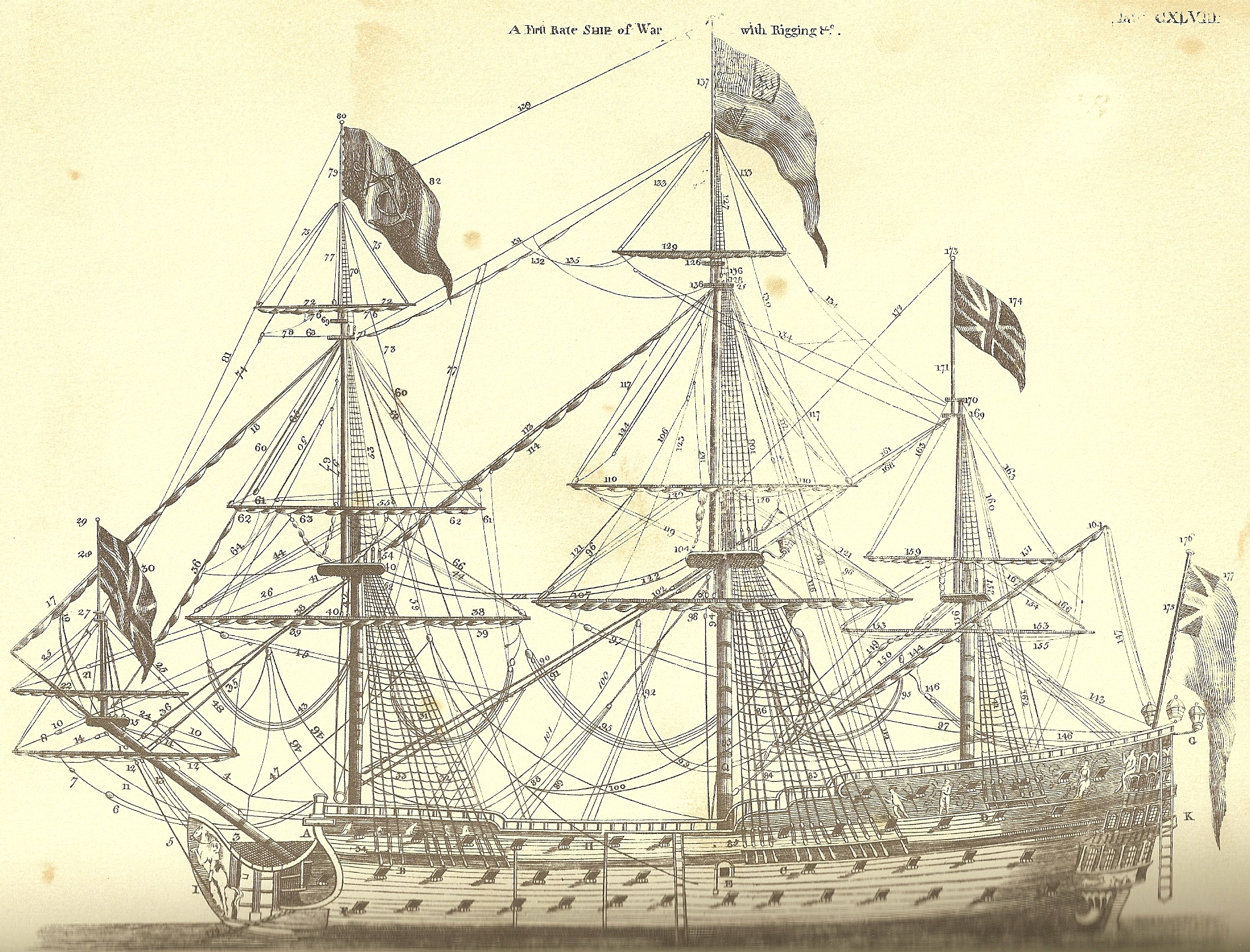
Bell's copperplate engraving of a first rate ship-of-war from the First Edition of the Encyclopædia Britannica - "undoubtedly the noblest machine that ever was invented"

Andrew Bell (1726–1809) was a Scottish engraver and printer, who co-founded Encyclopædia Britannica with Colin Macfarquhar.

== Biography ==
Bell was born in Edinburgh in 1726, his father a baker. He had little formal education and was apprenticed to the engraver Richard Cooper. Bell was a colourful Scot. His height was four foot six inches (1.37 m); he had crooked legs and an enormous nose that he would sometimes augment with a papier-mache version whenever anyone stared at his natural nose. Bell began work as an engraver of crests, names, etc., on dog collars. Despite his small stature, he deliberately rode the tallest horse available in Edinburgh, dismounting by a ladder to the cheers of onlookers.

Bell produced almost all of the copperplate engravings for the 1st–4th editions of the Britannica: 160 for the 1st, 340 for the 2nd, 542 for the 3rd, and 531 for the 4th. By contrast, the 50 plates of the Supplement to the 3rd edition were engraved by D. Lizars.

After Macfarquhar died in 1793, Bell bought out his heirs and became sole owner of the Britannica until his own death in 1809. He quarrelled with his son-in-law, Thomson Bonar, and refused to speak with him for the last ten years of his life.

== Family ==
He married Anne Wake who was the daughter of an excise officer in 1756. She was apparently the granddaughter of the artist John Scougal and through this connection Bell inherited many of Scougal's paintings.
