= Encyclopædia Britannica Ultimate Reference Suite =

DVD-based software based on the Encyclopædia Britannica

- Screenshot of the Encyclopædia Britannica 2010 Ultimate Reference Suite
- Developer: Encyclopædia Britannica, Inc.
- Release: 2003; 23 years ago
- Stable release: 2015 Ultimate Edition
- Operating system: Microsoft Windows; Mac OS X
- Size: 4.2 GB
- Available in: English
- Type: Encyclopaedia
- License: Proprietary software

Encyclopædia Britannica Ultimate Reference Suite is an encyclopaedia based on the Encyclopædia Britannica and published by Encyclopædia Britannica, Inc. It was published between 2003 and 2015.

== Product description ==
The DVD contains over 100,000 articles, an atlas, around 35,000 media files (images, video and audio) and a dictionary and thesaurus based on Merriam-Webster.

BrainStormer, is a dynamic index

The software included the BrainStormer, a tool for browsing topics in the encyclopaedia by using a dynamic index (graphical interface of dynamic Mind Maps, based on Propædia and TheBrain software).

== Awards ==
Encyclopædia Britannica Ultimate Reference Suite received the 2004 Distinguished Achievement Award from the Association of Educational Publishers. Its predecessor, Britannica DVD, received Codie awards in 2000, 2001 and 2002.

== Linux support ==
There is no official release of Britannica for the Linux operating system; however, a script is provided that can help experienced users run Encyclopædia Britannica 2004 Ultimate Reference Suite DVD (and other 2004 editions of Britannica) on Linux, with some limitations (for example the dictionary, Flash/QuickTime presentations, and content update functions do not work, and preferences must be edited manually). This script specifically requires version 1.3.1 of JRE, but can usually be made to work with newer versions if the version check is commented out.

== Minimum system requirements ==
The 2012 edition states the following system requirements:

Item	Minimum Requirement
Processor	Pentium III, PowerPC G5 or Intel Core
Memory	512 MB RAM (1 GB recommended)
Optical disc	DVD-ROM drive
Hard Disk Space	2.05 GB free hard-drive space (4.70 GB for full installation)
Display	1024x768 resolution, 16-bit color
Operating System	Windows® XP (with SP2), Windows® Vista or Windows® 7 (Vista through 8.1 for the 2015 edition); Mac®OS 10.5.x or 10.6.x (10.6 or 10.7 for the 2013 edition and for the Mac version of the 2014 edition; 10.7 to 10.9 for the Mac version of the 2015 edition)

== See also ==
- Encyclopædia Britannica
- Britannica.com
