= Propædia =

One of three parts of the 15th edition of Encyclopædia Britannica

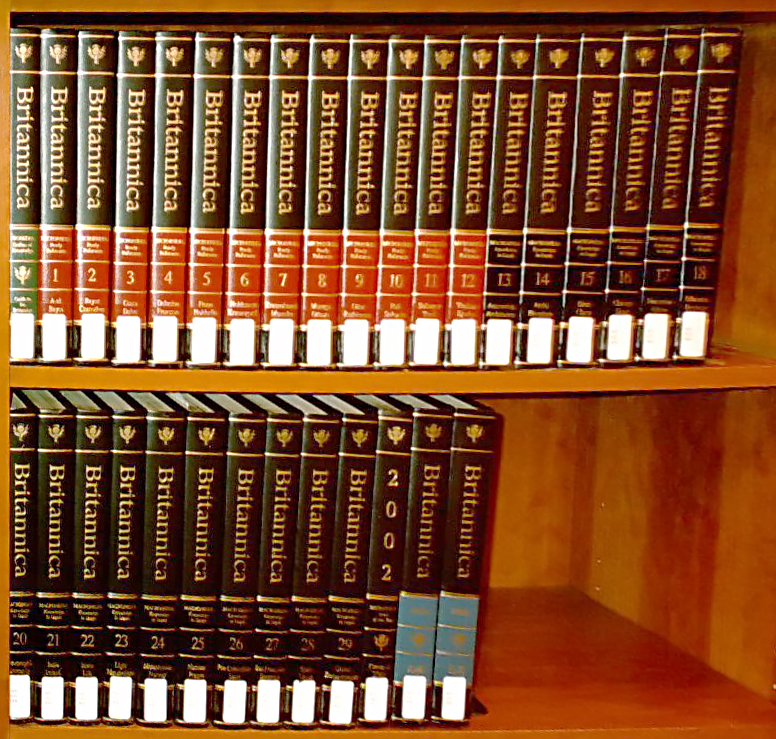
Encyclopaedia Britannica, 15th edition

The one-volume Propædia is the first of three parts of the 15th edition of Encyclopædia Britannica, intended as a compendium and topical organisation of the 12-volume Micropædia and the 17-volume Macropædia, which are organised alphabetically. Introduced in 1974 with the 15th edition, the Propædia and Micropædia were intended to replace the Index of the 14th edition; however, after widespread criticism, the Britannica restored the Index as a two-volume set in 1985. The core of the Propædia is its Outline of Knowledge, which seeks to provide a logical framework for all human knowledge. However, the Propædia also has several appendices listing the staff members, advisors and contributors to all three parts of the Britannica.

The last edition of the print Britannica was published in 2010.

== Outline of Knowledge ==
Like the Britannica as a whole, the Outline has three types of goals:

- Epistemological: to provide a systematic, hierarchical categorisation of all human knowledge, a 20th-century analog of the Great Chain of Being and Francis Bacon's outline in Instauratio magna.
- Educational: to lay out a course of study for each major discipline, a "roadmap" for learning a whole field.
- Organisational: to serve as an expanded Table of Contents for the Micropædia and Macropædia.

According to Mortimer J. Adler, the designer of the Propædia, all articles in the full Britannica were designed to fit into the Outline of Knowledge.

The Outline has 167 sections, which are categorised into 41 divisions and then into 10 parts. Each part has an introductory essay written by the same individual responsible for developing the outline for that part, which was done in consultation and collaboration with a handful of other scholars. In all, 86 men and one woman were involved in developing the Outline of Knowledge.

The Outline was an eight-year project of Mortimer J. Adler, published 22 years after he published a similar effort (the Syntopicon) that attempts to provide an overview of the relationships among the "Great Ideas" in Adler's Great Books of the Western World series. (The Great Books were also published by the Encyclopædia Britannica Inc.) Adler stresses in his book, A Guidebook to Learning: For a Lifelong Pursuit of Wisdom, that the ten categories should not be taken as hierarchical but as circular.

The whole of the Propædia's synoptic outline of knowledge deserves to be read carefully. It represents a twentieth-century scheme for the organization of knowledge that is more comprehensive than any other and that also accommodates the intellectual heterodoxy of our time.

— Mortimer J. Adler, in A Guidebook, pp. 91–2

=== Contents ===
==== 1. Matter and Energy ====
The lead author was Nigel Calder, who wrote the introduction "The Universe of the Physicist, the Chemist, and the Astronomer".

- 1.1 Atoms
  - 1.1.1 Structure and Properties of Atoms
  - 1.1.2 Atomic Nuclei and Elementary Particles
- 1.2 Energy, Radiation, and States of Matter
  - 1.2.1 Chemical Elements: Periodic Variation in Their Properties
  - 1.2.2 Chemical Compounds: Molecular Structure and Chemical Bonding
  - 1.2.3 Chemical Reactions
  - 1.2.4 Heat, Thermodynamics, Liquids, Gases, Plasmas
  - 1.2.5 The Solid State of Matter
  - 1.2.6 Mechanics of Particles, Rigid and Deformable Bodies: Elasticity, Vibration, and Flow
  - 1.2.7 Electricity and Magnetism
  - 1.2.8 Waves and Wave Motion
- 1.3 The Universe
  - 1.3.1 The Cosmos
  - 1.3.2 Galaxies and Stars
  - 1.3.3 The Solar System

==== 2. The Earth ====
The lead author was Peter John Wyllie, who wrote the introduction "The Great Globe Itself".

- 2.1 Earth's Properties, Structure, Composition
  - 2.1.1 The Planet Earth
  - 2.1.2 Earth's Physical Properties
  - 2.1.3 Structure and Composition of the Earth's Interior
  - 2.1.4 Minerals and Rocks
- 2.2 Earth's Envelope
  - 2.2.1 The Atmosphere
  - 2.2.2 The Hydrosphere: the Oceans, Freshwater and Ice Masses
  - 2.2.3 Weather and Climate
- 2.3 Surface Features
  - 2.3.1 Physical Features of the Earth's Surface
  - 2.3.2 Features Produced by Geomorphic Processes
- 2.4 Earth's History
  - 2.4.1 Origin and Development of the Earth and Its Envelopes
  - 2.4.2 The Interpretation of the Geologic Record
  - 2.4.3 Eras and Periods of Geologic Time

==== 3. Life ====
The lead author was René Dubos, who wrote the introduction "The Mysteries of Life".

- 3.1 The Nature and Diversity of Life
  - 3.1.1 Characteristics of Life
  - 3.1.2 The Origin and Evolution of Life
  - 3.1.3 Classification of Living Things
- 3.2 The Molecular Basis of Life
  - 3.2.1 Chemicals and the Vital Processes
  - 3.2.2 Metabolism: Bioenergetics and Biosynthesis
  - 3.2.3 Vital Processes at the Molecular Level
- 3.3 The Structures and Functions of Organisms
  - 3.3.1 Cellular Basis of Form and Function
  - 3.3.2 Relation of Form and Function in Organisms
  - 3.3.3 Coordination of Vital Processes: Regulation and Integration
  - 3.3.4 Covering and Support: Integumentary, Skeletal, and Musculatory Systems
  - 3.3.5 Nutrition: the Procurement and Processing of Nutrients
  - 3.3.6 Gas Exchange, Internal Transport, and Elimination
  - 3.3.7 Reproduction and Sex
  - 3.3.8 Development: Growth, Differentiation, and Morphogenesis
  - 3.3.9 Heredity: the Transmission of Traits
- 3.4 The Behavior of Organisms
  - 3.4.1 Nature and Patterns of Behavior
  - 3.4.2 Development and Range of Behavioral Capacities: Individual and Group Behavior
- 3.5 The Biosphere
  - 3.5.1 Basic Features of the Biosphere
  - 3.5.2 Populations and Communities
  - 3.5.3 Disease and Death
  - 3.5.4 Biogeographic Distribution of Organisms: Ecosystems
  - 3.5.5 The Place of Humans in the Biosphere

==== 4. Human Life ====
The lead author was Loren Eiseley, who wrote the introduction "The Cosmic Orphan".

- 4.1 The Development of Human Life
  - 4.1.1 Human Evolution
  - 4.1.2 Human Heredity: the Races
- 4.2 The Human Body: Health and Disease
  - 4.2.1 The Structures and Functions of the Human Body
  - 4.2.2 Human Health
  - 4.2.3 Human Diseases
  - 4.2.4 The Practice of Medicine and Care of Health
- 4.3 Human Behavior and Experience
  - 4.3.1 General theories of human nature and behavior
  - 4.3.2 Antecedent conditions and developmental processes affecting a person's behavior and conscious experience
  - 4.3.3 Influence of the current environment on a person's behavior and conscious experience: attention, sensation, and perception
  - 4.3.4 Current Internal states affecting a person' behavior and conscious experience
  - 4.3.5 Development of Learning and Thinking
  - 4.3.6 Personality and the Self: Integration and Disintegration

==== 5. Society ====
The lead author was Harold D. Lasswell, who wrote the introduction "Man the Social Animal".

- 5.1 Social Groups: Ethnic groups and Cultures
  - 5.1.1 Peoples and Cultures of the World
  - 5.1.2 The Development of Human Culture
  - 5.1.3 Major Cultural Components and Institutions of Societies
  - 5.1.4 Language and Communication
- 5.2 Social Organization and Social Change
  - 5.2.1 Social Structure and Change
  - 5.2.2 The Group Structure of Society
  - 5.2.3 Social Status
  - 5.2.4 Human Populations: Urban and Rural Communities
- 5.3 The Production, Distribution, and Utilization of Wealth
  - 5.3.1 Economic Concepts, Issues, and Systems
  - 5.3.2 Consumer and Market: Pricing and Mechanisms for Distributing Goods
  - 5.3.3 The Organization of Production and Distribution
  - 5.3.4 The Distribution of Income and Wealth
  - 5.3.5 Macroeconomics
  - 5.3.6 Economic Growth and Planning
- 5.4 Politics and Government
  - 5.4.1 Political Theory
  - 5.4.2 Political Institutions: the Structure, Branches, & Offices of Government
  - 5.4.3 Functioning of Government: the Dynamics of the Political Process
  - 5.4.4 International Relations: Peace and War
- 5.5 Law
  - 5.5.1 Philosophies and Systems of Law; the Practice of Law
  - 5.5.2 Branches of Public Law, Substantive and Procedural
  - 5.5.3 Branches of Private Law, Substantive and Procedural
- 5.6 Education
  - 5.6.1 Aims and Organization of Education
  - 5.6.2 Education Around the World

==== 6. Art ====
The lead author was Mark Van Doren, who wrote the introduction "The World of Art".

- 6.1 Art in General
  - 6.1.1 Theory and Classification of the Arts
  - 6.1.2 Experience and Criticism of Art; the Nonaesthetic Context of Art
  - 6.1.3 Characteristics of the Arts in Particular Cultures
- 6.2 Particular Arts
  - 6.2.1 Literature
  - 6.2.2 Theater
  - 6.2.3 Motion Pictures
  - 6.2.4 Music
  - 6.2.5 Dance
  - 6.2.6 Architecture, Garden and Landscape Design, and Urban Design
  - 6.2.7 Sculpture
  - 6.2.8 Drawing, Painting, Printmaking, Photography
  - 6.2.9 Decoration and Design

==== 7. Technology ====
The lead author was Lord Peter Ritchie-Calder, who wrote the introduction "Knowing How and Knowing Why".

- 7.1 Nature & Development of Technology
  - 7.1.1 Technology: Its Scope and History
  - 7.1.2 The Organization of Human Work
- 7.2 Elements of Technology
  - 7.2.1 Technology of Energy Conversion and Utilization
  - 7.2.2 Technology of Tools and Machines
  - 7.2.3 Technology of Measurement, Observation, and Control
  - 7.2.4 Extraction and Conversion of Industrial Raw Materials
  - 7.2.5 Technology of Industrial Production Processes
- 7.3 Fields of Technology
  - 7.3.1 Agriculture and Food Production
  - 7.3.2 Technology of the Major Industries
  - 7.3.3 Construction Technology
  - 7.3.4 Transportation Technology
  - 7.3.5 Technology of Information Processing and of Communications Systems
  - 7.3.6 Military Technology
  - 7.3.7 Technology of the Urban Community
  - 7.3.8 Technology of Earth and Space Exploration

==== 8. Religion ====
The lead author was Wilfred Cantwell Smith, who wrote the introduction "Religion as Symbolism".

- 8.1 Religion in General
  - 8.1.1 Knowledge and Understanding of Religion
  - 8.1.2 Religious Life: Institutions and Practices
- 8.2 Particular Religions
  - 8.2.1 Prehistoric Religion and Primitive Religion
  - 8.2.2 Religions of Ancient Peoples
  - 8.2.3 Hinduism and Other Religions of India
  - 8.2.4 Buddhism
  - 8.2.5 Indigenous Religions of East Asia: Religions of China, Korea, and Japan
  - 8.2.6 Judaism
  - 8.2.7 Christianity
  - 8.2.8 Islam
  - 8.2.9 Other Religions and Religious Movements in the Modern World

==== 9. History ====
The lead author was Jacques Barzun, who wrote the introduction "The Point and Pleasure of Reading History".

- 9.1 Ancient Southwest Asia, North Africa, and Europe
  - 9.1.1 Ancient Southwest Asia and Egypt, the Aegean, and North Africa
  - 9.1.2 Ancient Europe and Classical Civilizations of the Mediterranean to AD 395
- 9.2 Medieval Southwest Asia, North Africa, and Europe
  - 9.2.1 The Byzantine Empire and Europe from AD 395–1050
  - 9.2.2 The Formative Period in Islamic History, AD 622–1055
  - 9.2.3 Western Christendom in the High and Later Middle Ages 1050–1500
  - 9.2.4 The Crusades, the Islamic States, and Eastern Christendom 1050–1480
- 9.3 East, Central, South, and Southeast Asia
  - 9.3.1 China to the Beginning of the Late T'ang AD 755
  - 9.3.2 China from the Late T'ang to the Late Ch'ing AD 755–1839
  - 9.3.3 Central and Northeast Asia to 1750
  - 9.3.4 Japan to the Meiji Restoration 1868, Korea to 1910
  - 9.3.5 The Indian Subcontinent and Ceylon to AD 1200
  - 9.3.6 The Indian Subcontinent 1200–1761, Ceylon 1200–1505
  - 9.3.7 Southeast Asia to 1600
- 9.4 Sub-Saharan Africa to 1885
  - 9.4.1 West Africa to 1885
  - 9.4.2 The Nilotic Sudan and Ethiopia AD 550–1885
  - 9.4.3 East Africa and Madagascar to 1885
  - 9.4.4 Central Africa to 1885
  - 9.4.5 Southern Africa to 1885
- 9.5 Pre-Columbian America
  - 9.5.1 Andean Civilization to AD 1540
  - 9.5.2 Meso-American Civilization to AD 1540
- 9.6 The Modern World to 1920
  - 9.6.1 Western Europe 1500–1789
  - 9.6.2 Eastern Europe, Southwest Asia, and North Africa 1480–1800
  - 9.6.3 Europe 1789–1920
  - 9.6.4 European Colonies in the Americas 1492–1790
  - 9.6.5 United States and Canada 1763–1920
  - 9.6.6 Latin-America and Caribbean to 1920
  - 9.6.7 Australia and Oceania to 1920
  - 9.6.8 South Asia Under European Imperialism 1500–1920
  - 9.6.9 Southeast Asia Under European Imperialism 1600–1920
  - 9.6.10 China until Revolution 1839–1911, Japan from Meiji Restoration to 1910
  - 9.6.11 Southwest Asia, North Africa 1800–1920, Sub-Saharan Africa 1885–1920: Under European Imperialism
- 9.7 The World Since 1920
  - 9.7.1 International Movements, Diplomacy and War Since 1920
  - 9.7.2 Europe Since 1920
  - 9.7.3 The United States and Canada Since 1920
  - 9.7.4 Latin American and Caribbean Nations Since 1920
  - 9.7.5 China in Revolution, Japanese Hegemony
  - 9.7.6 South and Southeast Asia: the Late Colonial Period and Nations Since 1920
  - 9.7.7 Australia and Oceania Since 1920
  - 9.7.8 Southwest Asia and Africa: the Late Colonial Period and Nations since 1920

==== 10. Branches of Knowledge ====
The lead author was Mortimer J. Adler, who wrote the introduction "Knowledge Become Self-conscious".

- 10.1 Logic
  - 10.1.1 History and Philosophy of Logic
  - 10.1.2 Formal Logic, Metalogic, & Applied Logic
- 10.2 Mathematics
  - 10.2.1 History and Foundations of Mathematics
  - 10.2.2 Branches of Mathematics
  - 10.2.3 Applications of Mathematics
- 10.3 Science
  - 10.3.1 History and Philosophy of Science
  - 10.3.2 The Physical Sciences
  - 10.3.3 The Earth Sciences
  - 10.3.4 The Biological Sciences
  - 10.3.5 Medicine
  - 10.3.6 The Social Sciences, Psychology, Linguistics
  - 10.3.7 The Technological Sciences
- 10.4 History and The Humanities
  - 10.4.1 Historiography
  - 10.4.2 The Humanities and Humanistic Scholarship
- 10.5 Philosophy
  - 10.5.1 History of Philosophy
  - 10.5.2 Divisions of Philosophy
  - 10.5.3 Philosophical Schools and Doctrines
- 10.6 Preservation of Knowledge
  - 10.6.1 Institutions and Techniques for the Collection, Storage, Dissemination and Preservation of Knowledge

== Contributors to the Outline of Knowledge ==
Table 2: Contributors to the Outline of Knowledge in the Propædia
Name	Date of birth	Date of death	Part of Outline	Description	Index
Mortimer J. Adler	1902	2001	All Parts	Editor	1
Charles Van Doren	1926	2019	All Parts	Associate editor; Editorial Vice President of Encyclopædia Britannica Inc. (1973–1982)	2
William J. Gorman		1982	All Parts	Associate editor; Senior Fellow of the Institute for Philosophical Research	3
A. G. W. Cameron	1925	2005	Matter and Energy	Professor of Astronomy, Harvard University	4
Farrington Daniels	1889	1972	Matter and Energy	Professor of Chemistry, University of Wisconsin–Madison, Madison	5
Morton Hamermesh	1915	2003	Matter and Energy	Professor of Physics, University of Minnesota, Minneapolis (1975–1986)	6
Vincent E. Parker	1914	1997	Matter and Energy	Emeritus Professor of Physics, California State Polytechnic University, Pomona; Dean, School of Science (1967–1977)	7
Richard J. Chorley	1927	2002	The Earth	Professor of Geography, University of Cambridge; Fellow of Sidney Sussex College, Cambridge	8
William Stelling von Arx	1916	1999	The Earth	Senior Scientist, Woods Hole Oceanographic Institution (1968–1978)	9
Peter John Wyllie	1930		The Earth	Professor of Geology and Chairman, Division of Geological and Planetary Sciences, California Institute of Technology	10
N. J. Berrill	1903	1996	Life on Earth	Strathcone Professor of Zoology, McGill University (1946–1965)	11
Vincent Dethier	1915	1993	Life on Earth	Gilbert L. Woodside Professor of Zoology, University of Massachusetts Amherst (1975–1993)	12
Louis S. Goodman	1906	2000	Life on Earth	Distinguished Professor of Pharmacology, University of Utah, Salt Lake City	13
Garrett Hardin	1915	2003	Life on Earth	Emeritus Professor of Human Ecology, University of California, Santa Barbara	14
Ernst Walter Mayr	1904	2005	Life on Earth	Alexander Agassiz Professor Emeritus of Zoology, Harvard University	15
John Alexander Moore	1915	2002	Life on Earth	Emeritus Professor of Biology, University of California, Riverside	16
Theodore T. Puck	1916	2005	Life on Earth	Professor of Biology, Biophysics and Genetics; Distinguished Professor of Medicine, University of Colorado, Health Sciences Center; Director, Eleanor Roosevelt Institute for Cancer Research	17
Birgit Vennesland	1913	2001	Life on Earth	Head, Vennesland Research Laboratory, Max Planck Society (1970–1981); Director, Max Planck Institute for Cell Physiology, Berlin (1968–1970)	18
Paul B. Weisz	1919	2012	Life on Earth	Professor of Biology, Brown University	19
Ralph H. Wetmore	1892	1989	Life on Earth	Emeritus Professor of Botany, Harvard University	20
Emil H. White			Life on Earth	D. Mead Johnson Professor of Chemistry, Johns Hopkins University	21
Wilfrid Edward Le Gros Clark	1895	1971	Human Life	Professor of Anatomy, University of Oxford	22
Russell S. Fisher		1985	Human Life	Chief Medical Examiner, State of Maryland; Professor of Forensic Pathology, University of Maryland Medical School, Baltimore	23
F. Clark Howell	1925	2007	Human Life	Professor of Anthropology, University of California, Berkeley	24
Gregory A. Kimble	1917	2006	Human Life	Emeritus Professor of Psychology, Duke University	25
Erich Klinghammer	1930	2011	Human Life	Associate Professor of Psychology, Purdue University	26
Warren Sturgis McCulloch	1899	1969	Human Life	Staff member, Research Laboratory of Electronics, MIT (1952–1969)	27
William J. McGuire	1925	2012	Human Life	Professor of Psychology, Yale University	28
Peter Medawar	1915	1987	Human Life	Nobel Prize for Physiology or Medicine, 1960; Jodrell Professor of Zoology and Comparative Anatomy, University College London (1951–1962); Director, National Institute, Mill Hill, London (1962–1971); Scientific staff member, Medical Research Council, England (1971–1984)	29
William J. Baumol	1922	2017	Human Society	Professor of Economics, New York University; Emeritus Professor of Economics, Princeton University	30
Daniel Bell	1919	2011	Human Society	Henry Ford II Professor Emeritus of Social Science, Harvard University	31
Guiliano H. Bonfante			Human Society	Former Professor of Linguistics, University of Turin	32
Kenneth E. Boulding	1910	1993	Human Society	Distinguished Professor of Economics, University of Colorado, Boulder	33
Lewis A. Coser	1913	2003	Human Society	Distinguished Professor Emeritus of Sociology, SUNY, Stony Brook	34
Sigmund Diamond	1920	1999	Human Society	Giddings Professor Emeritus of Sociology, Columbia University	35
Carl J. Friedrich	1901	1984	Human Society	Eaton Professor of the Science of Government, Harvard University (1955–1971)	36
Paul Mundy			Human Society	Professor of Sociology and Chairman, Department of Criminal Justice, Loyola University Chicago	37
Kenyon E. Poole	1909	1988	Human Society	Professor of Economics, Northwestern University	38
C. Herman Pritchett			Human Society	Emeritus Professor of Political Science, University of California, Santa Barbara and University of Chicago	39
Sol Tax	1907	1995	Human Society	Professor of Anthropology, University of Chicago (1948–1976); Director, Center for the Study of Man, Smithsonian Institution	40
Charles Raymond Whittlesey	1900	1979	Human Society	Emeritus Professor of Finance and Economics, University of Pennsylvania	41
Rudolf Arnheim	1904	2007	Art	Emeritus professor of Psychology of Art, Carpenter Center for the Visual Arts, Harvard University	42
Robert Jesse Charleston	1916	1994	Art	Keeper, Department of Ceramics, Victoria and Albert Museum (1963–1976)	43
Clifton Fadiman	1904	1999	Art	Member, Board of Editors, Encyclopædia Britannica	44
Francis Fergusson	1904	1986	Art	Professor of Comparative Literature, Rutgers University (1953–1969); Professor of Comparative Literature, Princeton University (1973–1981)	45
John Gloag	1896	1981	Art	Novelist and writer on architecture and industrial design	46
Richard Griffith	1912	1969	Art	Curator, Museum of Modern Art Film Library (1951–1965); Lecturer on Motion Pictures, Wesleyan University (1967–1969)	47
Richard Hoggart	1918	2014	Art	Professor of English, University of Birmingham (1962–1973); Warden, Goldsmiths' College, University of London (1976–1984)	48
Edward Lockspeiser	1905	1973	Art	Officier d'Académie, Paris; Writer and broadcaster on music.	49
Roy McMullen		1984	Art	Author, critic, and art historian	50
Leonard B. Meyer	1918	2007	Art	Benjamin Franklin Professor of Music and Humanities, University of Pennsylvania	51
Michael Morrow	1929	1994	Art	Music editor, Encyclopædia Britannica; Director, Musica Reservata, London	52
Beaumont Newhall	1908	1993	Art	Director, Eastman Kodak House (1958–1971); Visiting Professor of Art, University of New Mexico (1971–1984)	53
Herbert Read	1893	1968	Art	Watson Gordon Professor of Fine Art, University of Edinburgh (1931–1933); editor, The Burlington Magazine (1933–1939); Charles Eliot Norton professor of Poetry, Harvard University (1953–1954)	54
Richard Roud	1929	1989	Art	Program Director, London (1959–1963) and New York (1963–1987) Film Festivals; Film critic, The Guardian (1963–1969)	55
George Savage		1982	Art	Art consultant; author of Porcelain Through the Ages, Pottery Through the Ages, and other works	56
Wolfgang Stechow	1896	1974	Art	Professor of Fine Arts, Oberlin College (1940–1963)	57
Joshua C. Taylor		1981	Art	William Rainey Harper Professor of Humanities and Professor of Art, University of Chicago (1963–1974); Director, National Collection of Fine Arts, Smithsonian Institution	58
Everard M. Upjohn	1903	1978	Art	Professor of Fine Arts, Columbia University (1951–1970)	59
Pierre Verlet	1908	1987	Art	Chief Curator, Cluny Museum (1945–1965); Chief Curator, National Museum of Sèvres Porcelain (1945–1965); Chief Curator of Art Objects from the Middle Ages to the Modern Period, Louvre Museum (1945–1965)	60
René Wellek	1903	1995	Art	Sterling Professor of Comparative Literature, Yale University (1952–1972)	61
Glynne William Gladstone Wickham	1922	2004	Art	Emeritus Professor of Drama, University of Bristol; Dean, Faculty of Arts (1970–1972)	62
Raymond (Henry) Williams	1921	1988	Art	Professor of Drama, University of Cambridge (1974–1983); Fellow of Jesus College, Cambridge (1961–1988)	63
Paul S. Wingert	1900	1974	Art	Professor of Art History and Archaeology, Columbia University	64
Bruno Zevi	1918	2000	Art	Professor of Architectural History, University of Rome (1963–1979)	65
Konstantinos Apostolos Doxiadis	1914	1975	Technology	Chairman, Doxiadis Associates International; Chairman, Board of Directors, Doxiadis Associates, Inc.; Washington D.C. Chairman, Board of Directors, Athens Technological Organization; President, Athens Center of Ekistics	66
Eugene S. Ferguson	1916	2004	Technology	Emeritus Professor of History, University of Delaware; Curator of Technology, Hagley Museum, Greenville Delaware	67
Melvin Kranzberg	1917	1995	Technology	Callaway Professor of the History of Technology, Georgia Institute of Technology (1972–1988)	68
Harvey G. Mehlhouse			Technology	Vice President, Western Electric Company, New York City (1965–1969); President (1969–1971); Chairman of the Board (1971–1972)	69
Robert Smith Woodbury		1983	Technology	Professor of the History of Technology, MIT	70
Arthur Llewellyn Basham	1914	1986	Religion	Professor of Asian Civilizations, Australian National University	71
James T. Burtchaell	1934	2015	Religion	Professor of Theology, University of Notre Dame; Provost (1970–1977)	72
J. V. Langmead Casserley	1909	1978	Religion	Professor of Apologetics, Seabury-Western Theological Seminary	73
Ichiro Hori		1974	Religion	Professor of the History of Religions, Seijo University and Kokugakuin University	74
Jaroslav Jan Pelikan	1923	2006	Religion	Sterling Professor of History, Yale University; President, American Academy of Arts and Sciences	75
Jakob Josef Petuchowski	1925	1991	Religion	Sol and Arlene Bronstein Professor of Judeo-Christian Studies, Hebrew Union College, Jewish Institute of Religion, Cincinnati (1981–1991)	76
Jacques Barzun	1907	2012	The History of Mankind	University Professor Emeritus, Columbia University; Dean of Faculties and Provost (1958–1967)	77
Otto Allen Bird	1914	2009	The Branches of Knowledge	Emeritus Professor of Arts and Letters, University of Notre Dame	78
Wing-Tsit Chan	1901	1994	The Branches of Knowledge	Professor of Chinese Philosophy and Culture, Dartmouth College (1942–1966); Anna R. D. Gillespie Professor of Philosophy, Chatham University (1966–1982)	79
William Herbert Dray	1921	2009	The Branches of Knowledge	Emeritus Professor of Philosophy and of History, University of Ottawa	80
Norwood Hanson	1924	1967	The Branches of Knowledge	Professor of Philosophy, Yale University (1963–1967)	81
J. H. Hexter	1910	1996	The Branches of Knowledge	Charles L. Stillé Professor of History, Yale University, (1967–1978); Distinguished Historian in residence, Washington University in St. Louis (1978–1986)	82
Ernan V. McMullin	1924	2011	The Branches of Knowledge	Professor of Philosophy, University of Notre Dame	83
Karl Menger	1902	1985	The Branches of Knowledge	Professor of Mathematics, Illinois Institute of Technology (1946–1971)	84
Arthur Norman Prior	1914	1969	The Branches of Knowledge	Fellow, Balliol College, University of Oxford; Professor of Philosophy, Manchester University (1959–1966)	85
Nicholas Rescher	1928	2024	The Branches of Knowledge	University Professor of Philosophy, University of Pittsburgh; editor, American Philosophical Quarterly	86
Seymour Schuster	1926	2020	The Branches of Knowledge	Professor of Mathematics, Carleton College	87

Section 4.2.1 uses transparencies of organ systems originally commissioned by Parke-Davis. Similar in design to the three-dimensional Visible Man and Visible Woman dolls designed by sculptor Marcel Jovine, successive plastic sheets reveal different layers of human anatomy.

== Legacy ==
BrainStormer, is a dynamic index in DVD's Ultimate Reference Suite

DVD-edition Ultimate Reference Suite included the BrainStormer, a tool for browsing topics in the encyclopaedia using a dynamic index, a graphical interface of dynamic Mind Maps, with highlighting in different colours: people, places, things, and related concepts, based on Propædia and TheBrain software. Britannica.com includes simple list pages roughly corresponding to chapters of Propædia.

== See also ==
- History of the Encyclopædia Britannica
- Encyclopédie
- Propaedeutics – A historical term for an introductory course into an art or science
- Threshold knowledge
- Outline of knowledge
- Outline of academic disciplines
