= The Know-It-All =

2004 book by A. J. Jacobs

The Know-It-All: One Man's Humble Quest to Become the Smartest Person in the World
- Cover to The Know it All
- Author: A. J. Jacobs
- Language: English
- Subject: Encyclopædia Britannica
- Publisher: Simon & Schuster
- Publication date: 2004
- Publication place: United States
- Pages: 386 pp
- ISBN: 0-7432-5060-5
- OCLC: 55067170
- Dewey Decimal: 031 22
- LC Class: AE5.E44 J33 2004

The Know-It-All: One Man's Humble Quest to Become the Smartest Person in the World is a book by Esquire editor A. J. Jacobs, published in 2004.

It recounts his experience of reading the entire Encyclopædia Britannica; all 32 volumes of the 2002 edition, extending to over 33,000 pages with some 44 million words. He set out on this endeavour to become the "smartest person in the world". The book is organized alphabetically in encyclopedia format and recounts both interesting facts from the encyclopedia and the author's experiences.

It was a New York Times Best Seller.

== Reviews ==
The satirist P.J. O'Rourke said of it: "The Know-It-All is a terrific book. It's a lot shorter than the encyclopedia, and funnier, and you'll remember more of it. Plus, if it falls off the shelf onto your head, you'll live."

By contrast, Joe Queenan in The New York Times Book Review contended that much of which Jacobs reported as remarkable discoveries, e.g. the tale of Heloise and Abelard and the assassination of Marat by a woman, were already common knowledge among educated people. Jacobs responded that "the ridiculously hyperbolic subtitle might have been a tip-off" of the book's ironic tone.

== Similar feats ==
A.J. Jacobs was not the first to read the entire Britannica. The earliest recorded example was Fath Ali, who upon becoming the Shah of Persia in 1797, was given a gift of the 3rd edition of the Britannica. After reading all of its 18 volumes, the Shah extended his royal title to include "Most Formidable Lord and Master of the Encyclopædia Britannica". Roughly a century later, Amos Urban Shirk, an American businessman, read the entire 23-volume 1911 Encyclopædia Britannica over a period of four years. He then went on to read the entire 14th edition, spending on average three hours per night.

Biographer Ashlee Vance claims Elon Musk read the Encyclopædia Britannica twice.

Bill Gates read the entire World Book Encyclopedia in his youth.

== Bibliography ==
- A.J. Jacobs (2004). The Know-It-All: One Man's Humble Quest to Become the Smartest Person in the World. ISBN 0-7432-5060-5.
- Joe Queenan's review of the book, A Little Learning Is a Dangerous Thing, and A.J. Jacobs' response, I Am Not a Jackass, both in The New York Times.
