= Immersion journalism =

Style of journalism

Immersion journalism or immersionism is a reporting method, frequently used in literary journalism, in which journalists embed themselves among subjects of a story. The method demands "time spent on the job," as described by literary journalist Norman Sims, and allows for reporters to tell stories with authority. Immersion journalism is similar to ethnography.

== Overview ==
Immersionism details an individual's experiences from a deeply personal perspective. An individual will choose a situation and immerse themselves in the events and people involved. Unlike Gonzo journalism, however, it is less focused on the writer's life and more about the writer's specific experiences. Proponents of immersion journalism claim this research strategy allows authors to describe the internal experience of external events and break away from the limiting pseudo-objectivity of traditional journalism.

== Examples ==
=== Print ===
Book-length examples of immersion journalism include H.G. Bissinger's Friday Night Lights; John Howard Griffin's Black Like Me; Ted Conover's Rolling Nowhere, Coyotes and Newjack: Guarding Sing Sing; Barbara Ehrenreich's Nickel and Dimed: On (Not) Getting By in America (2001), Bait and Switch: The (Futile) Pursuit of the American Dream (2005), A.J. Jacobs' The Year of Living Biblically (2007) and Matthew Thompson's Running with the Blood God (2013) and My Colombian Death (2008).

=== Film ===
Examples of immersionist film include the documentary Super Size Me and Heavy Metal in Baghdad and Fat, Sick and Nearly Dead.

=== Television and radio ===
Examples of immersionist programming include the various offerings of media company Vice and segments of US public broadcasting series like Frontline, Planet Money, and This American Life.

== Notable figures ==
=== Elizabeth Jane Cochrane ===
Elizabeth Jane Cochrane, known by her pseudonym Nellie Bly is seen as a "pioneer" of immersion journalism. Cochrane made herself the center of the story when she was admitted to a mental asylum undercover to expose the abuse of female inmates at the Women's Lunatic Asylum on Blackwell's Island. The series, Ten Days in a Mad-House, was published in New York World in 1887. The legitimacy of her tactics as a form of credible journalism has been questioned, as she placed in Time's "Top 10 Literary Stunts" which describes journalists who have "elevated the literary gimmick" of immersing themselves in atypical scenarios.

=== Jon Franklin ===
Jon Franklin earned a Pulitzer Prize for an article he wrote for the Evening Sun in 1979. Franklin followed a woman through her brain surgery. Unexpectedly, the woman died, and he instead focused his piece on the surgeon, Dr. Ducker. The article includes the details of the doctor's emotionally draining career and the suspense of Mrs. Kelly's operation.

== Criticism ==
Immersion journalism has been criticized for being too subjective and partial to the journalist's opinion. By immersing oneself in the subject for extended periods of time, the credibility of the writer's neutrality weakens. A Washington Post seven-part article which followed Vice President Quayle went under fire for its lack of neutrality. Washington City Paper editor Jack Shafter said the reporters "got way, way too close. With this kind of immersion journalism, you lose perspective, you lose sight of the goal, and you become this authorized biographer."

Robin Hemley's book A Field Guide for Immersion Writing: Memoir, Journalism, and Travel describes David Shields' book Black Planet which observed white fans' "fascination" with black basketball players. Shield "exaggerated and conflated a few things" but was not untruthful. Hemley says that he received scathing reviews, which was a hidden success, since it proved that Shields "hit a nerve."

Practicality also becomes a central issue opposing immersion journalism. A complete work of immersion journalism has flexible deadlines, which not all news sources can afford. The New York Times writer Jesse McKinley spent a month working alongside actors to "expose the daily torment that is life way-way off Broadway." Anne Hull of the St. Petersburg Times worked six months following the lives of a Tampa police officer and the teen who attacked her. However, many news sources value quick stories at a rapid pace to increase profits, according to the Columbia Journalism Review.

== See also ==
- Ethnography
- Gonzo journalism
- Journalistic interventionism
- Narrative journalism
- Participant observation
