= Coyotes (book) =

1987 nonfiction book by Ted Conover

Coyotes: A Journey Across Borders with America's Mexican Migrants
- Author: Ted Conover
- Language: English
- Genre: Non-fiction
- Publisher: Vintage Books
- Publication date: 1987
- Publication place: United States
- ISBN: 0-394-75518-9

Coyotes: A Journey Across Borders with America's Mexican Migrants is a 1987 nonfiction book by journalist and professor Ted Conover. The book is based on his travels, seasonal labor stints, and participatory journalism research with Mexican migrant workers in the late 1980s. The book was written at a time when American political stances on Mexican migrant workers were becoming increasingly polarized.

After his experiences traveling the rails with Mexican migrant workers during his undergraduate ethnography research on American railroad hoboes—which resulted in the publication of his first book, Rolling Nowhere—Conover was inspired to try his participatory journalism method in a new context. In writing Coyotes, he became one of the first modern American journalists to document the Sisyphean setbacks and harrowing risks experienced by Mexican migrant workers who seek seasonal agricultural work in the Western and Southern United States, and who rely on paid traffickers known as coyotes for assistance in crossing the Mexico–United States border.

In the fifth chapter of Coyotes, Conover writes about the four months he spent living with his migrant worker friends in their family homes in Ahuacatlán de Guadalupe, in Querétaro, Mexico. During his time in Ahuacatlán de Guadalupe, Conover comes to understand how the seasonal absence of so many young and middle-aged men affects local family and village life. A conversation between Conover and a local village priest reveals the economic and social changes inflicted on the village when young men leave in droves to seek seasonal farmwork in the United States.

Conover works alongside his companions in the citrus orchards of the Southern United States, where he rapidly develops awe and respect for these migrant workers and their tireless work ethic. He also writes about his experiences living, cooking, and teaching English in crowded temporary housing with these migrant workers in the United States, where he captures the challenges, lifestyles, and dreams of these men and the wives and girlfriends who occasionally accompany them.

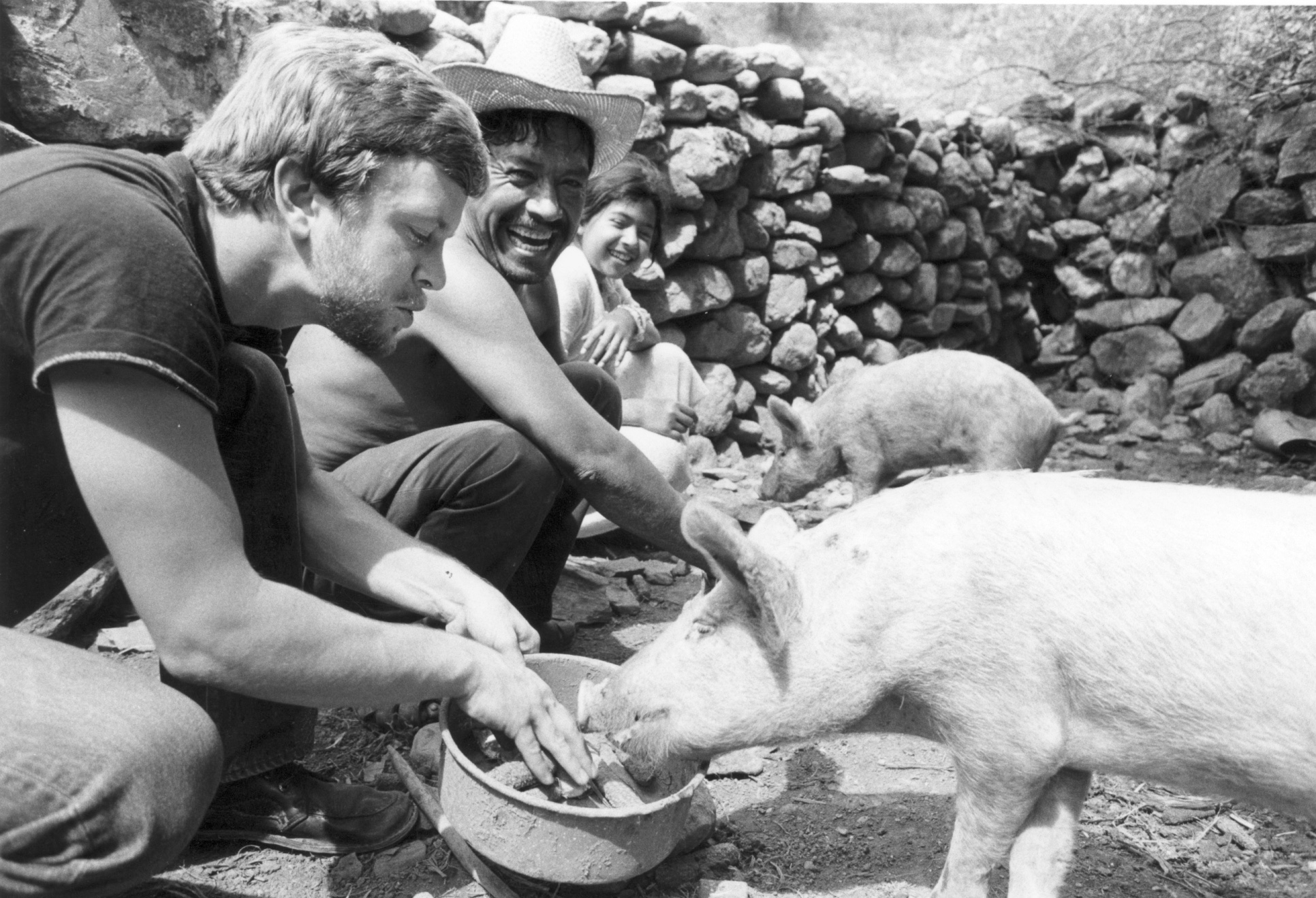
Ted Conover in Ahuacatlán de Guadalupe, Querétaro, Mexico. Photo by Philip Decker, 1984.

To better understand and experience the methods and risks associated with illegal border crossing, Conover crosses the border from Mexico into the United States with groups of migrant workers on two different occasions. The second crossing requires Conover and his migrant worker companions to cross part of the Organ Pipe Cactus National Monument desert on foot. At various points throughout the book, especially during encounters with American and Mexican law enforcement officials, Conover struggles with his own fears of the legal implications inherent in traveling and living with the migrant workers. Ultimately, he discovers that the Mexican border authorities can be the most violent and extortionist of all towards fellow Mexicans.

Conover also presents an account of his conversations with an American potato rancher in Idaho who depends on annual seasonal labor from Mexican migrant workers.

Conover's first-person participatory journalism approach was warmly reviewed in the New York Times by Michiko Kakutani, who wrote

Absorbing … sharply observed and sympathetic … Mr. Conover’s description of what would normally be a routine plane flight from Phoenix to Los Angeles becomes a perilous, frightening journey for these workers; and a cross-country drive from Arizona to Florida (without a map) similarly takes on the nervous coloration of a thriller. In relating these events, Mr. Conover combines a sociologist’s eye for detail with a novelist’s sense of drama and compassion … he has defiantly succeeded.

It was also praised in the New York Times Book Review and in the New Yorker; it received a mixed review in the Los Angeles Times Coyotes became the second of three books that "cemented Conover's reputation as one of the finest participatory journalists of his generation."
