= A. J. Jacobs =

American journalist and author

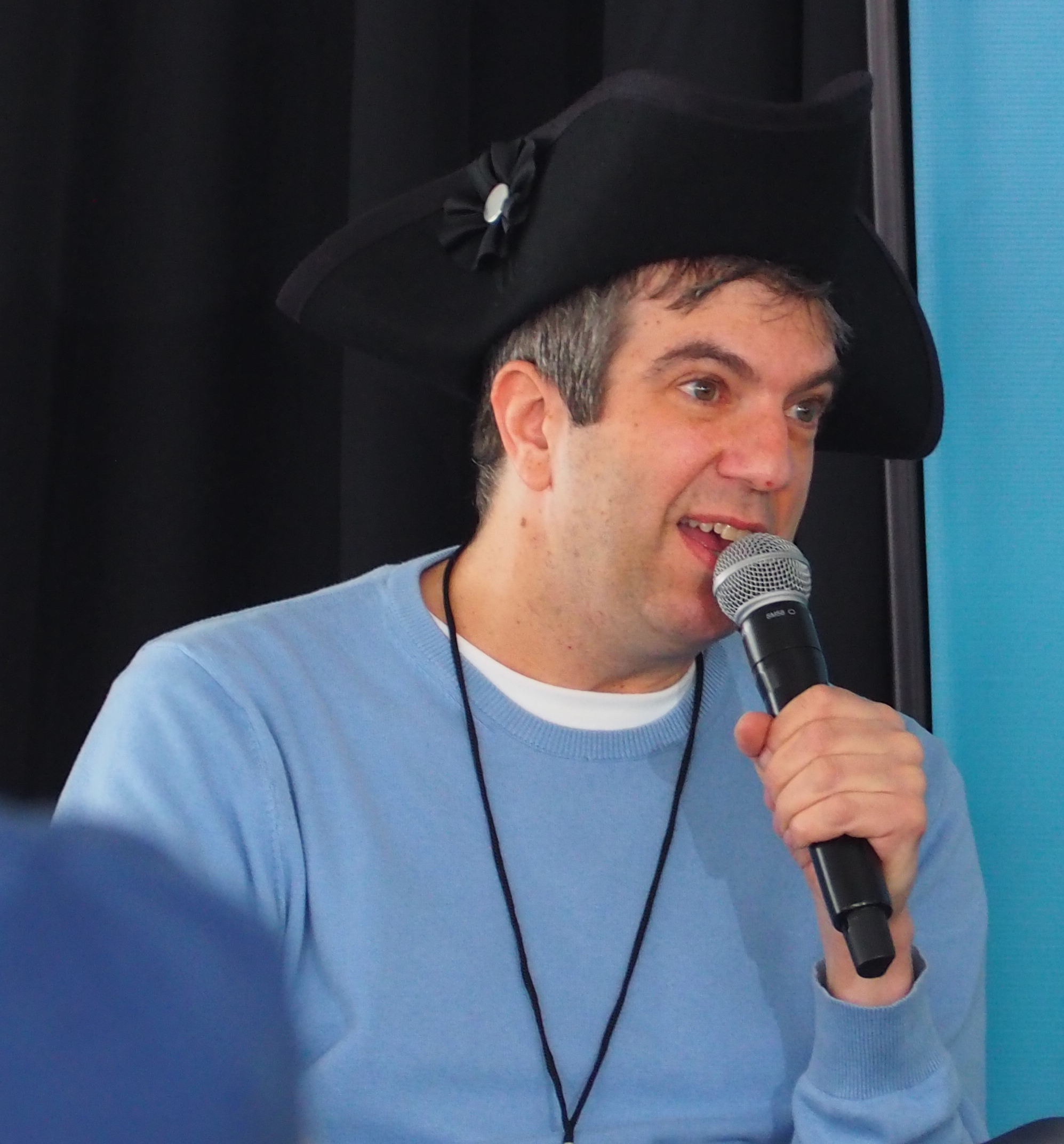
- Jacobs reading at the 2024 Gaithersburg Book Festival
- Born: March 20, 1968 (age 58); New York City, New York, U.S.
- Education: Brown University
- Notable credit(s): The Know-It-All, The Year of Living Biblically
- Title: Editor at Large, Esquire magazine
- Spouse: Julie Schoenberg
- Children: 3
- Website: ajjacobs.com

Arnold Stephen Jacobs Jr., commonly called A.J. Jacobs (born March 20, 1968), is an American journalist, author, and lecturer best known for writing about his lifestyle experiments. He is an editor at large for Esquire and has worked for the Antioch Daily Ledger and Entertainment Weekly. Books written by him include The Know-It-All (2004), The Year of Living Biblically (2007) and The Guinea Pig Diaries (2009).

== Early life and education ==
Jacobs was born in New York City to secular Jewish parents, Arnold Jacobs Sr., a lawyer, and Ellen Kheel. He has one sister, Beryl Jacobs. He was educated at the Dalton School and Brown University.

== Career ==
Jacobs has said that he sees his life as a series of experiments in which he immerses himself in a project or lifestyle, for better or worse, then writes about what he learned. The genre is often called immersion journalism or "stunt journalism".

In one of these "stunts", Jacobs read all 32 volumes of the Encyclopædia Britannica, which he wrote about in his book, The Know-It-All: One Man's Humble Quest to Become the Smartest Person in the World (2004). In the book, he also chronicles his personal life along with various endeavors like joining Mensa. The book spent eight weeks on The New York Times Best Seller list. NPR's Weekend Edition ran a series of segments featuring the unusual facts Jacobs learned. Jacobs also wrote a column for Mental Floss magazine describing the highlights of each volume. The book received positive reviews in The New York Times, Time magazine and USA Today. However, Joe Queenan panned it in the New York Times Book Review. Queenan called the book "corny, juvenile, smug, tired" and "interminable" and characterized Jacobs as "a prime example of that curiously modern innovation: the pedigreed simpleton." Four months later, Jacobs responded in an essay entitled "I Am Not a Jackass".

In 2005 Jacobs out-sourced his life to India such that personal assistants would do everything for him from answering his e-mails, reading his children good-night stories, and arguing with his wife. Jacobs wrote about it in an Esquire article called "My Outsourced Life" (2005). The article was excerpted in The 4-Hour Workweek by Timothy Ferriss. Jacobs also talked about his outsourcing experiences on a Moth storytelling podcast.

In another experiment Jacobs wrote an article for Esquire called "I Think You're Fat" (2007) about the experiment he conducted with Radical Honesty, a lifestyle of total truth-telling promoted by Virginia therapist Brad Blanton, whom Jacobs interviewed for the article.

Jacobs' book The Year of Living Biblically: One Man's Humble Quest to Follow the Bible as Literally as Possible (2007) chronicles his experiment to live for one year according to all the moral codes expressed in the Bible, including stoning adulterers, blowing a shofar at the beginning of every month, and refraining from trimming the corners of his facial hair (which he followed by not trimming his facial hair at all). The book spent 11 weeks on the New York Times bestseller list, and Jacobs gave a TED talk about what he learned during the project. In May 2017, CBS Television picked up a TV series based on the book. It was originally renamed By the Book for television, but later changed to Living Biblically.

The Guinea Pig Diaries: My Life as an Experiment (2009) is a series of first-person essays about his experiences with various guides for human behavior.

Jacobs is the author of The Two Kings: Elvis and Jesus (1994), an irreverent comedic comparison of Elvis Presley and Jesus; and America Off-Line (1996).

In his book Drop Dead Healthy: One Man's Humble Quest for Bodily Perfection (2012), he explores different ways humans can bring their bodies to peak health, from diet to exercise. He wrote the book while walking on a treadmill. Jacobs gave a related TED talk about this health quest entitled "How Healthy Living Nearly Killed Me".

From 2011 to 2012, Jacobs wrote the "Extreme Health" column for Esquire magazine, covering such topics as high-intensity interval training and the quantified self. Since 2012, he has written the "Modern Problems" advice column for mental floss magazine. The column compares modern day life to the horrors of the past.

As of May 2013, Jacobs writes a weekly advice column for Esquire.com called "My Huddled Masses". The column is crowdsourced to Jacobs's 100,000 Facebook followers, who give etiquette and love advice. He also writes the regular feature "Obituaries" for Esquire, which consists of satirical death notices for cultural trends, such as American hegemony.

On June 6, 2015, Jacobs hosted the Global Family Reunion at the New York Hall of Science. Satellite events were held in Salt Lake City, Utah (in partnership with FamilySearch; Cleveland, Ohio (at the Western Reserve Historical Society; Zionsville, Indiana; and Independence, Missouri (at the Midwest Genealogy Center). His project aimed to connect as many people as possible to the global family tree at Geni.com and WikiTree, and the event was planned to be the largest family reunion in history. His experience planning and hosting the event is documented in his 2017 book It's All Relative.

On December 5, 2016, Gimlet Media announced Jacobs as the host of Twice Removed, a podcast focused on genealogy. In June 2016, Gimlet announced that the podcast would not be renewed for a second season.

Jacobs' April 2022 book The Puzzler reframes global issues as puzzles. In the fall of 2023, the daily podcast The Puzzler with A.J. Jacobs was launched.

In September 2022, The New York Times published a story by Jacobs detailing a 1988 kayaking excursion in which he and his sister were lost overnight in the waterways of Glacier Bay National Park. They were eventually saved by an unknown group of campers on Kidney Island and a search seaplane rented by their father.

== Personal life ==
Jacobs is married to Julie Schoenberg and has three sons.

Jacobs is a first cousin once removed of the legal scholar Cass Sunstein.

Jacobs is a member of Giving What We Can; he has pledged to give 10% of his lifetime earnings to charity. He donates to the Against Malaria Foundation and other effective altruism organizations.

== Bibliography ==
=== Books ===
- Jacobs, A. J. (1994). The Two Kings: Jesus & Elvis. Bantam Books. ISBN 9780553373752.
- 1996. America Off-Line: The Complete Outernet Starter Kit ISBN 978-0836224337
- 2003. Esquire Presents: What It Feels Like ISBN 978-1416599081. Edited by Jacobs.
- 2005. The Know-It-All: One Man's Humble Quest to Become the Smartest Person in the World ISBN 978-0743250627
- 2007. The Year of Living Biblically: One Man's Humble Quest to Follow the Bible as Literally as Possible (2007) ISBN 978-0743291477
- 2010. The Guinea Pig Diaries: My Life as an Experiment ISBN 1439104999
- 2012. Drop Dead Healthy: One Man's Humble Quest for Bodily Perfection ISBN 978-1416599081
- 2017. It's All Relative: Adventures Up and Down the World's Family Tree ISBN 978-1476734491
- 2018. Thanks A Thousand: A Gratitude Journey ISBN 978-1501119927
- 2022. The Puzzler: One Man's Quest to Solve the Most Baffling Puzzles Ever, from Crosswords to Jigsaws to the Meaning of Life ISBN 978-0593136713
- 2024. The Year of Living Constitutionally: One Man's Humble Quest to Follow the Constitution's Original Meaning

=== Essays and reporting ===
- 2005. "My Outsourced Life", Esquire
- 2007. "I Think You're Fat", Esquire
- 2008. "My Life as a Hot Woman"', Esquire
- 2009. "The 9:10 to Crazyland", Esquire
- 2012. "How to Blurb and Blurb and Blurb", The New York Times
- 2012. "Overly Documented Life", Esquire
- Jacobs, A. J. (January 2013). "Highly achievable resolutions : this year, don't make it so easy to disappoint yourself". Man at His Best. Esquire. 159 (1): 24.
- 2013. "Grading the MOOC University", The New York Times
