= Radical Candor =

2017 book by Kim Malone Scott

Radical Candor: Be A Kick-Ass Boss Without Losing Your Humanity
- First edition
- Author: Kim Scott
- Language: English
- Genre: Business leadership
- Published: March 2017
- Publisher: St. Martin's Press
- Publication place: USA
- ISBN: 978-1-250-10350-5
- Followed by: Just Work: Get Sh*t Done Fast & Fair (2021)

Radical Candor: Be a Kick-Ass Boss Without Losing Your Humanity is a business leadership book written by former Apple and Google executive Kim Malone Scott. In the book, Scott defines the term radical candor as feedback that incorporates both praise and criticism. Unlike radical transparency or radical honesty, Scott says the management principle of radical candor involves “caring personally while challenging directly.” The book was first published in 2017 by St. Martin's Press. A fully revised and updated version was released in 2019.

== Summary ==
To explain the concept of radical candor, Scott introduces what she calls a compass for candid conversations and defines the following four behaviors that managers fall into when giving feedback.

- Obnoxious Aggression, also called brutal honesty or front stabbing, is what happens when managers challenge employees directly, but do not show they care about the individuals personally. It includes both insincere praise and unkind criticism.
- Ruinous Empathy is when managers care for individuals personally, but they fail to challenge employees directly. It includes praise that is not specific and criticism that is sugar-coated and unclear.
- Manipulative Insincerity, also known as backstabbing or passive-aggressive behavior, is what happens when managers neither care personally nor challenge directly. Their praise is insincere to a person’s face and their criticism is harsh behind a person’s back.
- Radical Candor is what happens when managers show that they care personally for employees while also challenging them directly with clear, kind feedback that is not aggressive or insincere.

To provide examples of each type of behavior, the book features stories from Scott’s time working and leading teams in Silicon Valley.

== Reception ==
The book is a New York Times and Wall Street Journal best seller in the business category.

Fast Company included it on their list of 7 Books To Help You Be A Better Leader In 2020 and Business Insider said it was one of 57 Highly Influential Business And Leadership Books That Can Boost Your Management Skills.

Vice’s Erin Vanderhoof said, “Radical Candor is a feminist-adjacent manifesto, though there are obvious limitations” saying that “Scott falls victim to Silicon Valley's myth of inevitable meritocracy in a way that limits her ability to solve any of the really pernicious problems that these companies face.”
