= Amos Urban Shirk =

American encyclopedist (1890–1956)

Amos Urban Shirk (c. 1890 – October 20, 1956) was an American businessman, author and reader of encyclopedias.

As a businessman he worked in the food industry. He wrote Marketing Through Food Brokers, published in 1939 by McGraw-Hill. He invented a synthetic chicle and introduced vitamin capsules to grocery stores.

He was also renowned as a prodigious reader. Shirk read the entire 23-volume 1911 Encyclopædia Britannica from cover to cover in four and a half years, reading on average three hours per evening, and taking two to six months per volume. Starting in 1934, he began reading the 14th edition, saying he found it a "big improvement" over the 11th, and saying that "most of the material had been completely rewritten".

Shirk did not limit himself to Britannica. He also read Henry Smith Williams's 24-volume Historians' History of the World, which took him two years, as well as an 18-volume set of works by Alexandre Dumas, a 32-volume set of Honoré de Balzac, and a 20-volume set of Charles Dickens.

Shirk had other hobbies including painting and record collecting.

== See also ==
- The Know-It-All: One Man's Humble Quest to Become the Smartest Person in the World
