= The Guinea Pig Diaries =

2009 book by A. J. Jacobs

The Guinea Pig Diaries: My Life As An Experiment
- Front cover of the hardcover edition
- Author: A. J. Jacobs
- Language: English
- Genre: Humor
- Publisher: Simon & Schuster
- Publication date: 2009
- Publication place: United States
- Pages: 256

The Guinea Pig Diaries: My Life As An Experiment is a book by A. J. Jacobs, an editor at Esquire magazine, published in 2009. On a mission to improve aspects of his life A. J. Jacobs becomes a human guinea pig, putting himself through a series of extreme lifestyle experiments.

== Synopsis ==
In the book, Jacobs attempts to change the way he thought, talked, and looked, through a series of social experiments. He immersed himself in his experiments and each comes with a conclusion about the lessons he has learned. Throughout the book, Jacobs applies George Washington's "110 Rules of Civility and Decent Behavior in Company and Conversation", quits multitasking to be the most focused person alive, follows the tenets of the Radical Honesty movement, applies the insights of behavioral economics in his decision making or assumes a female identity to gain a better understanding of online dating from a woman's point of view.

== Adaptation ==
The book has been adapted into a film for television. It was produced by Electric Dynamite, Reveille Productions, and Sony Pictures Television. It was directed by Michael Spiller. The main cast includes Donald Sutherland, Paget Brewster, and Adam Campbell.
