= Living Biblically =

2018 American TV sitcom

- Genre: Sitcom
- Based on: The Year of Living Biblically by A. J. Jacobs
- Developed by: Patrick Walsh
- Directed by: Andy Ackerman; Katy Garretson
- Starring: Jay R. Ferguson; Lindsey Kraft; Ian Gomez; David Krumholtz; Tony Rock; Camryn Manheim
- Composer: Ric Markmann
- Country of origin: United States
- Original language: English
- No. of seasons: 1
- No. of episodes: 13

Production
- Executive producers: Johnny Galecki; Andrew Haas; Spencer Medof; Patrick Walsh; Andy Ackerman
- Producer: Marc Solakian
- Camera setup: Multi-camera
- Running time: 22 minutes
- Production companies: Enrico Pallazzo Productions; Alcide Bava Productions; Warner Bros. Television

Original release
- Network: CBS
- Release: February 26 – July 21, 2018

Living Biblically is an American television sitcom created by Patrick Walsh and executive produced by Walsh and Johnny Galecki, with co-executive producers Andrew Haas, Spencer Medof, and director Andy Ackerman. The series was based on A. J. Jacobs' best-selling book, The Year of Living Biblically. The Warner Bros. Television-produced series began airing on CBS on February 26, 2018. The running time was 22 minutes per episode and included a laugh track. On May 11, 2018, CBS canceled the series after only eight of the thirteen first season episodes had aired. The network aired the remaining episodes from July 7 until July 21, 2018.

== Plot ==
The series chronicles Chip Curry: a married, lapsed Catholic film critic and expectant father's decision to improve his life by living according to the Bible, literally, after the death of his best friend. Though his wife and coworkers are confused and skeptical, Chip receives support from priest Father Gene, who nonetheless warns him of the potential consequences of trying to live by literal Biblical principles in modern times.

== Cast ==
=== Main ===
- Jay R. Ferguson as Chip Curry, a film critic for a newspaper who decides to improve his life by following the Bible literally after the death of his best friend.
- Lindsey Kraft as Leslie Curry, Chip's overbearing, pregnant wife who does not believe in Chip's new interest in Christianity.
- Ian Gomez as Father Gene, a liberal priest who is amused by Chip's plan but remains supportive. His full name is Eugenio Alberto Del Castillo Cabeza de Vaca.
- David Krumholtz as Rabbi Gil Ableman, a rabbi at the local synagogue who is supportive of Chip and ends up becoming good friends with Father Gene.
- Tony Rock as Vince Williams, Chip's skeptical but supportive friend and co-worker.
- Camryn Manheim as Ms. Meadows, Chip, Vince and Cheryl's strict and selfish boss, who cares only about money and the newspaper's success. Her first name is never mentioned.
- Sara Gilbert as Cheryl, a sarcastic co-worker of Chip's who writes obituaries.

== Episodes ==
Every episode of the series was directed by Andy Ackerman, with the exception of episode 11, which was directed by Katy Garretson instead.

No.	Title	Written by	Original release date	Prod. code	US viewers (millions)
1	"Pilot"	Patrick Walsh	February 26, 2018	T11.10117	5.011
After the death of his best friend, lapsed Catholic film reviewer and expectant father Chip Curry tries to turn his life around. When he accidentally purchases a copy of the Bible, he decides to live by it "to the letter" much to the confusion of his non-believing wife Leslie and the bemusement of his priest, Father Gene. Chip's newfound faith is put to the test when Gary (Joe DeRosa), a co-worker who is committing adultery, wants Chip to lie for him.
2	"False Idols"	Sophia Lear	March 5, 2018	T12.15904	4.476
After smashing his phone to avoid "worshiping false idols", Chip decides to go old school and rely on actual maps and compasses. He ends up over sleeping and forgets his "Love–Iversary" with Leslie and decides to get her Beyoncé tickets to make up for it. Vince, Cheryl and Meadows become concerned when he does not arrive for work or call in sick and decide to go look for him.
3	"Love Thy Neighbor"	Patrick Walsh	March 12, 2018	T12.15902	4.67
4	"Thou Shalt Not Steal"	Michael Lisbe & Nate Reger	March 19, 2018	T12.15903	4.06
5	"Honor Thy Father"	Michael Hobert	March 26, 2018	T12.15910	3.98
6	"Thou Shalt Not Bear False Witness"	Charles Brottmiller	April 2, 2018	T12.15905	4.14
7	"Let Us Pray"	Bill Martin & Mike Schiff	April 9, 2018	T12.15907	3.84
8	"Show Hospitality"	Jon Silberman & Josh Silberman	April 16, 2018	T12.15906	3.55
9	"Never Let Loyalty Leave You"	Jess Lamour	July 7, 2018	T12.15909	1.18
10	"Submit to Thy Husband"	Allison Bosma & Jon DeWalt	July 7, 2018	T12.15908	1.22
11	"Thou Shalt Not Covet"	Michael Lisbe & Nate Reger	July 14, 2018	T12.15911	1.12
12	"It's Better to Give Than to Receive"	Bill Martin & Mike Schiff	July 14, 2018	T12.15912	1.14
13	"David and Goliath"	Patrick Walsh	July 21, 2018	T12.15913	0.97

== Ratings ==
Viewership and ratings per episode of Living Biblically
No.	Title	Air date	Rating/share (18–49)	Viewers (millions)
1	"Pilot"	February 26, 2018	0.8/4	5.011
2	"False Idols"	March 5, 2018	0.7/3	4.476
3	"Love Thy Neighbor"	March 12, 2018	0.7/3	4.67
4	"Thou Shalt Not Steal"	March 19, 2018	0.7/2	4.06
5	"Honor Thy Father"	March 26, 2018	0.7/3	3.98
6	"Thou Shalt Not Bear False Witness"	April 2, 2018	0.8/3	4.14
7	"Let Us Pray"	April 9, 2018	0.6/3	3.84
8	"Show Hospitality"	April 16, 2018	0.6/2	3.55
9	"Never Let Loyalty Leave You"	July 7, 2018	0.2/1	1.18
10	"Submit to Thy Husband"	July 7, 2018	0.2/1	1.22
11	"Thou Shalt Not Covet"	July 14, 2018	0.2/1	1.12
12	"It's Better to Give Than to Receive"	July 14, 2018	0.2/1	1.14
13	"David and Goliath"	July 21, 2018	0.2/1	0.97

== Production ==
On May 12, 2017, the show was ordered to series under the title By the Book. On November 21, 2017, it was announced that the series, now titled Living Biblically, would premiere in the spring of 2018 and air on Mondays at 9:30 P.M. The series premiered February 26, 2018, on CBS and was given a thirteen episode order. On April 19, 2018, CBS pulled the series from the schedule after eight low-rated episodes, leaving five episodes unaired, and announced that the series will remain in production for all thirteen episodes and would return to the schedule at a later date. On May 11, 2018, Living Biblically was cancelled after one season. On June 7, 2018, it was announced that the show would return to the schedule on July 7, 2018 and the remaining five episodes would air over a three-week period. The final episode aired on July 21, 2018.

== Reception ==
On Rotten Tomatoes, the series holds an approval rating of 18% based on 17 reviews, with an average rating of 4.26/10. The site's critical consensus reads, "Living Biblically commits the cardinal TV sin of wasting the outline of a refreshingly unusual premise on broad, hammy acting and stock sitcom laughs." On Metacritic, the series has a weighted average score of 47 out of 100, based on 8 critics, indicating "mixed or average reviews".
