= Harriette Lombard Hennessy =

- Born: 23 June 1871; Dublin, Ireland
- Died: 13 April 1913 (aged 41); Killavullen, Ireland
- Occupations: Medical doctor, author, advisor on the Encyclopædia Britannica
- Spouse: James Walter Hennessy (married 1892)
- Children: 2

Harriette Lombard Hennessy (née Sheehy; 23 June 1871 - 13 April 1913) was an Irish medical doctor, author, and advisor on medical articles for the Encyclopædia Britannica.

== Life ==
Harriette Mary Lombard Sheehy was born on 23 June 1871 in Dublin, Ireland. She was the daughter of Charlotte (née Lombard) and Edward Bryan Sheehy. In 1892, she married James Walter Hennessy. The couple had two children: Christopher James (born 1893), and Olive Mary Hope (born 1894). James Walter Hennessy died in 1896.

Hennessy gained her M.D. degree in Brussels, and was licensed to practise by the Royal College of Physicians in the same year. By this time, medical schools in Ireland were open to women, and she was licensed to practise as both a physician and a surgeon. She opened her own medical practice in Fitzwilliam Square, Dublin.

Hennessy was involved with the Irish Women's Suffrage and Local Government Association, including by holding drawing room meetings at her Dublin home. She was also associated with the Irish Women's Progressive Union, for whom she spoke.

Hennessy acted as medical advisor to the Eleventh Edition of the Encyclopædia Britannica. She was given charge of sub-editing entries on medical topics, as well as contributing a number of her own. These appeared under her initials, "H. L. H.".

Hennessy died on 13 April 1913 in Killavullen, Ireland.
