= Margaret Bryant =

British writer

- Born: 15 April 1870; Lincolnshire
- Died: 14 February 1942 (aged 71); Oxford, Oxfordshire
- Occupations: Writer, researcher, contributor to the Encyclopædia Britannica
- Employer(s): Ministry of Food; League of Nations, Chatham House

Margaret Bryant (15 April 1870–14 February 1942) was an English writer, literary "devil", and contributor to the British Encyclopædia Britannica.

== Life ==
Margaret Anne Bryant was born in Lincolnshire in 1871, the daughter of T. W. Bryant. She worked as a high school teacher until 1901, when she joined the staff of the Encyclopaedia Britannica. She went on to edit The Daily News Year Book, and contributed to the Manchester Guardian and The Observer.

In her own words, Margaret Bryant “had no academic pretensions.” She was, though, described as a “born writer”, whose work often “passed unaltered into the print of surveys, reports and books signed by high- sounding and household names.” Bryant “devilled” (conducted research in the name of someone else) for Alfred George Gardner on The Life of Sir William Harcourt, and for J.L. Garvin on The Life of Joseph Chamberlain.

She worked as a researcher and writer for the Ministry of Food during the First World War, and the League of Nations from 1926. She was described as "a periodical and always welcome visitor to Geneva where her visits came to be known as heralding an unusual outburst of activity on the part of the league Secretariat.”

She then began working for the Royal Institute of International Affairs (Chatham House), remaining there until the end of her life. A colleague later wrote that:

When her spare little figure came almost apologetically round the half-opened door there was always a sheaf of manuscript under her arm, a pencil in one hand and a cigarette in the other. She came to the point at once, stuck to it (for she was firm!), and then took her leave, saying “All right, I'll get that done." She always did “get things done” on time.

== Death and legacy ==
Margaret Bryant died in Oxford on 14 February 1942. On her death, the Louth Standard described her as a "distinguished former resident" of Stickney, Lincolnshire, whose "politico-literary career" was "of considerable interest". A correspondent of The Times wrote that:

Margaret Bryant was one of those rare few who earn the title of indispensable. She had a passion for knowledge and a skill in using its store which made her one of the best-informed experts in many fields. The readers of the Bulletin of the Royal Institute of International Affairs always knew that the initials "M.B.” were the hall-mark of competence, and now they know whose modest signature they were. Even at the age of 71 Margaret Bryant was still in harness as the mainstay of the Information Department of Chatham House, and it is the plain sad truth that she literally died in its service. The Institute is indebted to her for some of its best-known published studies: ‘‘World Agriculture,” "Unemployment,’ and the “Colonial Problem"; and she did a great deal of the work of Sir John Hope Simpson’s “Refugee Survey.”

The Observer remembered Bryant as:

a worker and a fighter, concealing an iron will under a deceptively meek exterior, loving gay company, helping and inspiring all who came into contact with her, never sparing the ‘pygmy body’ which housed a gallant soul.

In 1992, Gillian Thomas profiled Margaret Bryant as part of A Position to Command Respect: Women and the Eleventh Britannica. Thomas described Bryant as "a poignant example" of the "nearly invisible work" of women both as contributors to the Britannica, and as workers in governmental and international agencies. She concluded:

Margaret Bryant worked, for the most part, in anonymity and her name is not included in Chisholm’s acknowledgements in the introduction [to the Encyclopædia Britannica Eleventh Edition]. She is, however, formally credited with whole or part authorship of ten different articles.
