= Red Lobster, White Trash and the Blue Lagoon =

1998 book

- Author: Joe Queenan
- Language: English
- Genre: Non-fiction, humour
- Publisher: Hyperion Books
- Publication date: 1998
- Publication place: United States
- Pages: 194
- ISBN: 0786863323

Red Lobster, White Trash and the Blue Lagoon: Joe Queenan's America is 1998 non-fiction book written by Joe Queenan.

== Overview ==
In describing the book, Salon.com wrote "It's a book about a self-described highbrow -- Queenan's an Elvis Costello fan, a Lingua Franca subscriber and a Henry James acolyte -- who yanks his baseball cap around backward and elects to spend a year mucking around in the lower realms of mass culture: dining at Sizzler steakhouses, grooving to Kenny G. albums, attending Andrew Lloyd Webber musicals, visiting Branson, Mo."

== Critical reception ==
The New York Times wrote "Queenan is at his best here when he savages people, places and things whose pathetic nature is hardly a given: Joe Pesci, Bill Moyers, soccer (his daughter 'had played 42 1-0 games over a five-year period and finally recognized that there was no light at the end of that particular tunnel') and the Incas (if the denizens of Machu Picchu 'were so goddamn smart, how come they didn't hang around longer?)'. Also more comedically rewarding than bashing a known buffoon is coming around and actually liking one. Who would guess, for example, that Queenan would leave a Barry Manilow concert thinking that the treacly Brooklynite "proved to be an enormously likable, self-effacing, ingratiating entertainer?"
