= Radical honesty =

Complete honesty devoid of any kind of deception

Radical honesty is the practice of complete honesty without telling even white lies. The phrase was trademarked in 1997 as a technique and self-improvement program based on the 1996 book Radical Honesty by Brad Blanton. While proponents of Radical Honesty present the practice as a moral imperative, Blanton's program argues against moralism and promote Radical Honesty as a means of reducing stress, deepening connections with others, and reducing reactivity.

== Background ==
=== Brad Blanton ===
W. Brad Blanton (born 1940) is an American psychotherapist and former politician who began the radical honesty movement. Based in Stanley, Virginia, Blanton ran as an independent candidate for Virginia's 7th congressional district in 2004 but lost to Republican Eric Cantor with around a quarter of the vote. (Note: According to The Washington Post, Blanton considered the political system to be gerrymandered and wanted to abolish the Virginia Department of Education and give its funds to parents and citizens' groups. He advocated for a significant increase in the wages of teachers and child care workers and in contrast minimum wage for lawyers, and banning donations from companies and unions as part of campaign finance reform.) He considered running again in 2006 but withdrew and endorsed Democrat James Nachman due to inadequate campaign funds. (Note: The Democratic Party of Virginia considered endorsing him but decided against it after Blanton refused and also disclosed that his workshops included a day of nudity.)

As a ten-year-old child growing up with an abusive and alcoholic stepfather, Blanton decided to "rescue people who were hurting and kill the mean people". However, he later turned to psychotherapy: "It's very hard to kill the mean people and take care of the helpless ones [...] The mean people are the helpless ones. So I decided that psychotherapy was the way."

After training with Fritz Perls and Werner Erhard, Blanton worked as a struggling psychotherapist in Downtown Washington, D.C. He eventually came to the conclusion that his clients were suffering because they were lying to the people in their lives. According to Blanton, he organized group therapy sessions, where his clients admitted their lies to others; he encouraged them to do so in their everyday lives. He claimed that his clients said they were ultimately better because of it. Blanton eventually began hosting retreats and workshops to experiment with his techniques.

=== Radical Honesty ===
Blanton self-published his book Radical Honesty in 1994 after being rejected by several publishers.

At a Moth Mainstage event in 2009, radio producer and writer Starlee Kine related her experience with Radical Honesty, which she labelled a cult. Kine described a seminar where Blanton was verbally abusive and at one point urged her to sign a contract to obey him completely for the duration of the event.

== In popular culture ==
The character Eli Loker, played by Brendan Hines, from the 2009 Fox series Lie to Me, adheres to Radical Honesty during the first season. From the website bio of the character in the first season: "Eli Loker is Lightman's lead researcher, who is so uncomfortable with the human tendency to lie that he's decided to practice what he calls "radical honesty". He says everything on his mind at all times and often pays the price".

In the Divergent series, the Candor faction is dedicated to practicing Radical Honesty.

Writer A.J. Jacobs devotes a chapter in his book The Guinea Pig Diaries to his attempts to live according to the precepts of Radical Honesty. Author Brandon Mendelson is a practitioner of a modified form of Radical Honesty.

In the last book of the Uglies series by Scott Westerfeld, a character named Frizz Mizuno invents a surgical brain procedure called "Radical Honesty" that renders him unable to lie. In fact, if he hears someone tell a lie when he himself knows the truth, he can't even simply not speak—he has to reveal the truth under any circumstances. Even at the possible cost of his own life and the lives of people he cares about, he still can't lie to save them, because his brain is wired to speak the truth.

In episode 20, season 6 of Bones, The Pinocchio in the Planter, the victim, Ross Dickson, is part of a fictional group called "The Honesty Policy" that practices Radical Honesty. The episode explores radical honesty from the perspective of the victim being deliberately rude and belligerent, with ill effects potentially leading to his demise, and with a crass and alienating character who attends the same group. However, it also explores, through several character subplots, positive outcomes resulting from honesty inspired by encountering the concept of Radical Honesty. The phrase "Radical Honesty" is used throughout the episode.

In episode 3, season 5 of Silicon Valley, "Chief Operating Officer", a character called Ben Burkhardt, played by Benjamin Koldyke, follows a leadership philosophy developed by Kim Scott called "Radical Candor", or as he calls it, "RadCan", which bears many of the hallmarks of a warped version of Radical Honesty. As an example, for comedic purposes, he is 'honest about lying' and withholding information from other characters when speaking with third parties.

== Bibliography ==
- Blanton, Brad 1996, Radical Honesty: How to Transform Your Life by Telling the Truth, Dell; 7th Printing edition, ISBN 0-440-50754-5
- Blanton, Brad 2000, Practicing Radical Honesty, SparrowHawk Publications, ISBN 0-9630921-9-7
- Blanton, Brad 2001, Honest to God: A Change of Heart That Can Change the World, SparrowHawk Publications, ISBN 0-9706938-1-8
- Blanton, Brad 2002, Radical Parenting: Seven Steps to a Functional Family in a Dysfunctional World, SparrowHawk Publications, ISBN 0-9706938-2-6
- Blanton, Brad 2004, The Truthtellers, SparrowHawk Publications, ISBN 0-9706938-3-4
- Blanton, Brad 2005, Radical Honesty, the New Revised Edition: How to Transform Your Life by Telling the Truth, SparrowHawk Publications; Revised edition, ISBN 0-9706938-4-2
- Blanton, Brad 2006, Beyond Good and Evil: The Eternal Split-Second Sound–Light Being, SparrowHawk Publications, ISBN 0-9706938-5-0
- Blanton, Brad 2011, The Korporate Kannibal Kookbook – The Empire Is Consuming Us, SparrowHawk Publications, ISBN 1-4507-4253-X
