= Rolling Nowhere =

1984 nonfiction book by Ted Conover

Rolling Nowhere: Riding the Rails with America's Hoboes
- Author: Ted Conover
- Publication date: 1984
- ISBN: 9780670603190

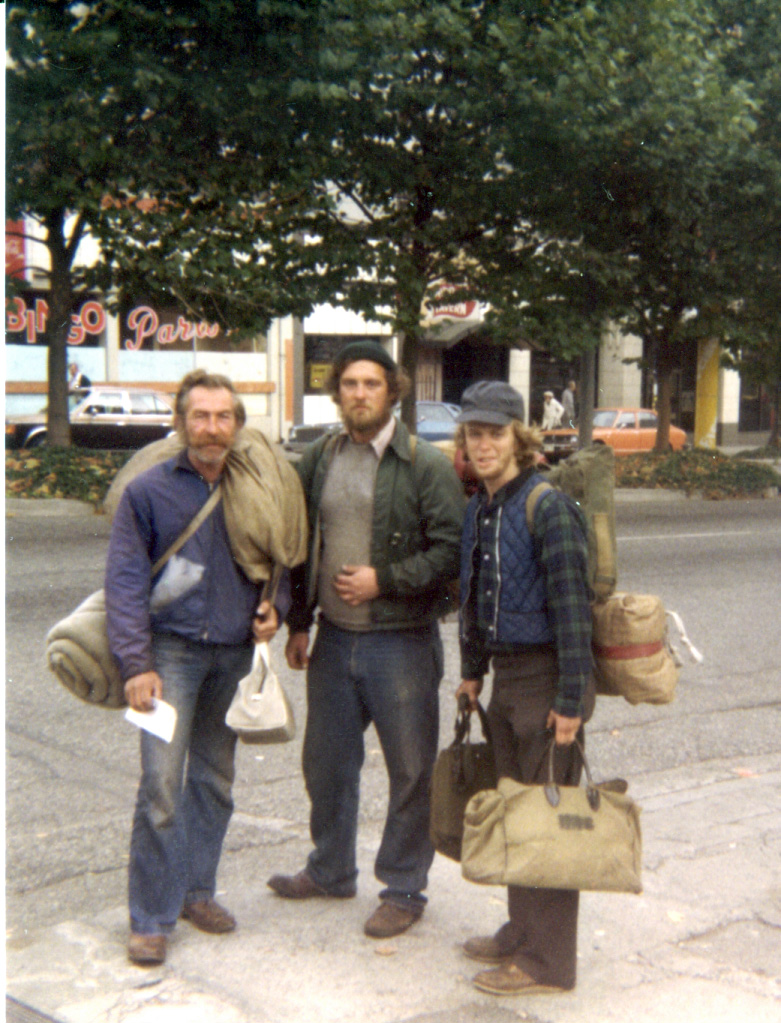
Ted Conover - Rolling Nowhere

Rolling Nowhere: Riding the Rails with America's Hoboes is a nonfiction book by journalist and professor Ted Conover based on his undergraduate ethnography research on the life and travel experiences of 1980s railroad hoboes in the Western United States. It was Conover’s debut book, for which he was represented by New York literary agent Sterling Lord, who had previously been the agent for Jack Kerouac. Conover’s success with Rolling Nowhere launched his career in what is now known as immersion journalism.

As an undergraduate student at Amherst College, Conover was fascinated by books he had read about American railroad hoboes and he decided to make their lifestyle and experiences the topic of his senior thesis. However, his advisors at Amherst had concerns about the safety risks of a student traveling and living as a transient on the rails. Thus, Conover chose to take a sojourn from his studies from August to December 1980 to immerse himself in the railroad hobo subculture and living conditions. The notebooks Conover kept during these four months became the raw material for his senior thesis, "Between Freedom and Poverty: Railroad Tramps of the American West," upon which Rolling Nowhere is based.

Rolling Nowhere documents Conover’s time as a well-educated, middle class man in his early twenties covertly traveling the rails and living with several different railroad hoboes across more than ten states in the American Midwest and West. He recounts his challenges, fears, and successes as he learns the freighthopping strategies, survival techniques, and social etiquette of the railroad hobo subculture. Conover also presents his observations of railroad hobo resourcefulness in obtaining food, night-time shelter, and other basic items and services. The book provides many anecdotes that illustrate the vulnerability of railroad hoboes to intragroup violence and racism, to harassment and suspicion from outsiders, to health and hygiene challenges, and to economic precariousness. Many of the hoboes Conover encounters are military veterans or men who have struggled to meet American society’s expectations for successful male breadwinners. Conover also captures the experiences of the rare female hobo and of Mexican immigrants traveling the rails in search of migrant work opportunities.
