= Ted Conover =

American author and journalist (born 1958)

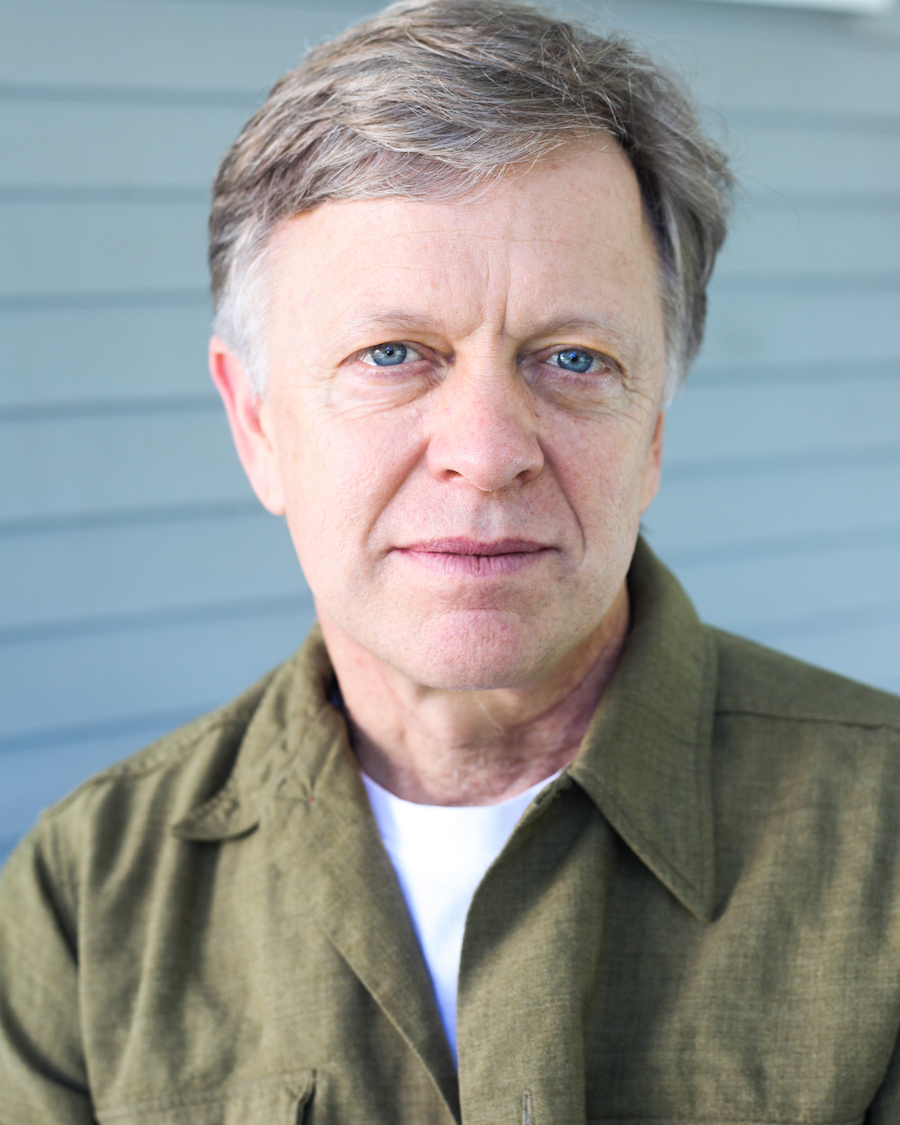
- photo by Phoebe Jones
- Born: January 17, 1958; Okinawa, Japan
- Education: Amherst College; Cambridge University
- Occupations: Author, Journalist, Professor
- Writing career
- Notable works: Rolling Nowhere, Newjack: Guarding Sing Sing, Immersion: A Writer's Guide To Going Deep
- Website: www.tedconover.com

Ted Conover (born January 17, 1958) is an American author and journalist who has been called a "master of immersion" and "master of experience-based narrative nonfiction." A graduate of Amherst College and a former Marshall Scholar, he is also a professor emeritus and past director of the Arthur L. Carter Journalism Institute of New York University, where he taught graduate courses in the Literary Reportage concentration, as well as undergraduate courses on the "journalism of empathy" and undercover reporting.

== Early life and education ==
Ted Conover was born in Okinawa, Japan and raised in Denver, Colorado. He was a student at Hill Junior High School in Denver, where he gained his earliest journalism experiences. He went on to attend Denver's George Washington High School and then enrolled at Manual High School after court-ordered desegregation resulted in school reassignments—a development that contributed to his early interests in research experiences that cross social, cultural, and geographical borders (see Keyes v. School District No. 1, Denver). Conover finished high school in 1976 and went on to graduate summa cum laude with a bachelor's degree in anthropology from Amherst College, where he was elected to Phi Beta Kappa. He was a Marshall Scholar at Cambridge University from 1982 to 1984 and received an honorary doctorate from Amherst College in 2001.

== Career ==
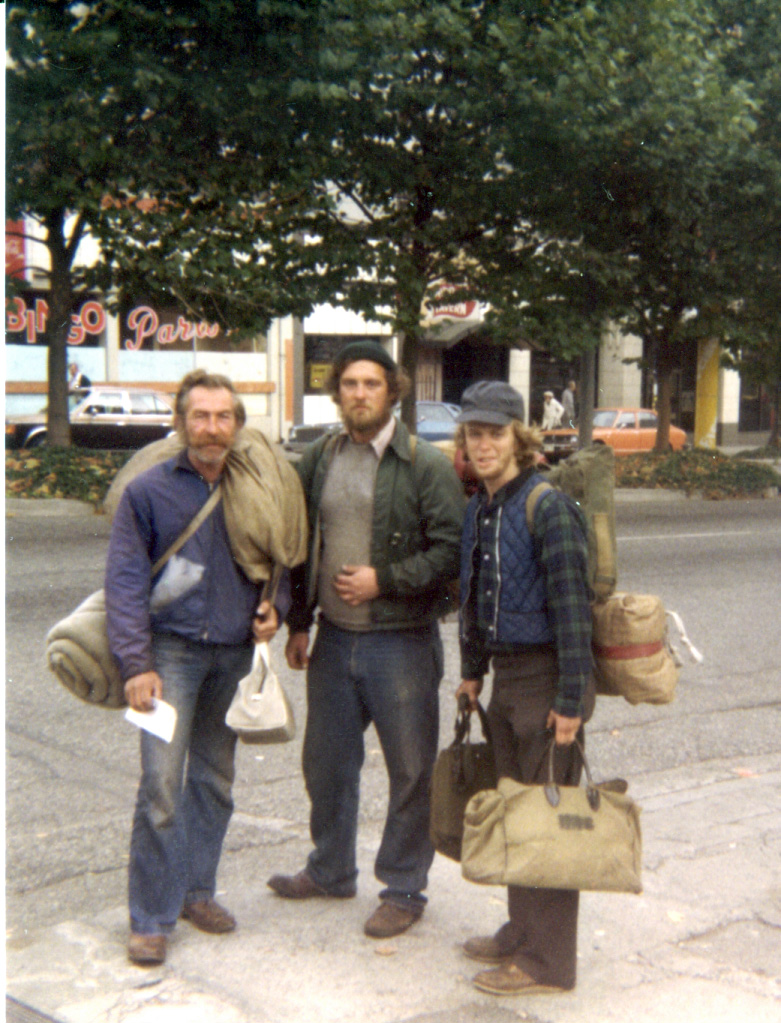
Ted Conover - Rolling Nowhere

=== Early journalism experiences ===
Conover first began looking for ways to combine creative writing and journalism by writing articles for the Hill Junior High newspaper, Torch. For one Torch article, he interviewed actor Lloyd Haynes after a chance encounter during a family ski trip. The article earned Conover his first front-page news feature. In high school and during undergraduate summer breaks Conover worked for Colorado newspapers such as the Aurora Sentinel and the Lakewood Sentinel. He and a friend rode bicycles from Seattle to New Jersey the summer before they began college in Massachusetts. For a personal essay class the next year, he described the final hour of that journey; the professor liked the piece and Conover pitched it to Bicycling! Magazine. The resulting article, "Finishing", was his first freelance sale, according to Conover.

Conover took an American Society of Magazine Editors internship at U.S. News & World Report during his junior year at Amherst College, which led him to think he "might have a place in that profession." He credits anthropology courses he took at Amherst with adding rigor and depth to both his thinking and his journalistic writing. His senior thesis, "Between Freedom and Poverty: Railroad Tramps of the American West," was an ethnography of railroad hobos. He published an article about this research in the Amherst student journal In Other Words. The article was reprinted in the Amherst alumni magazine, where it caught the attention of a wire service reporter in Springfield, Massachusetts who then interviewed Conover about the article. The reporter's article led to appearances on The Today Show and National Public Radio. This publicity enabled Conover to catch the attention of New York literary agent Sterling Lord, who had helped launch the career of Jack Kerouac. Lord represented Conover for his first book, Rolling Nowhere: Riding the Rails with America's Hoboes, which was based on Conover's undergraduate research.

=== Writing career ===
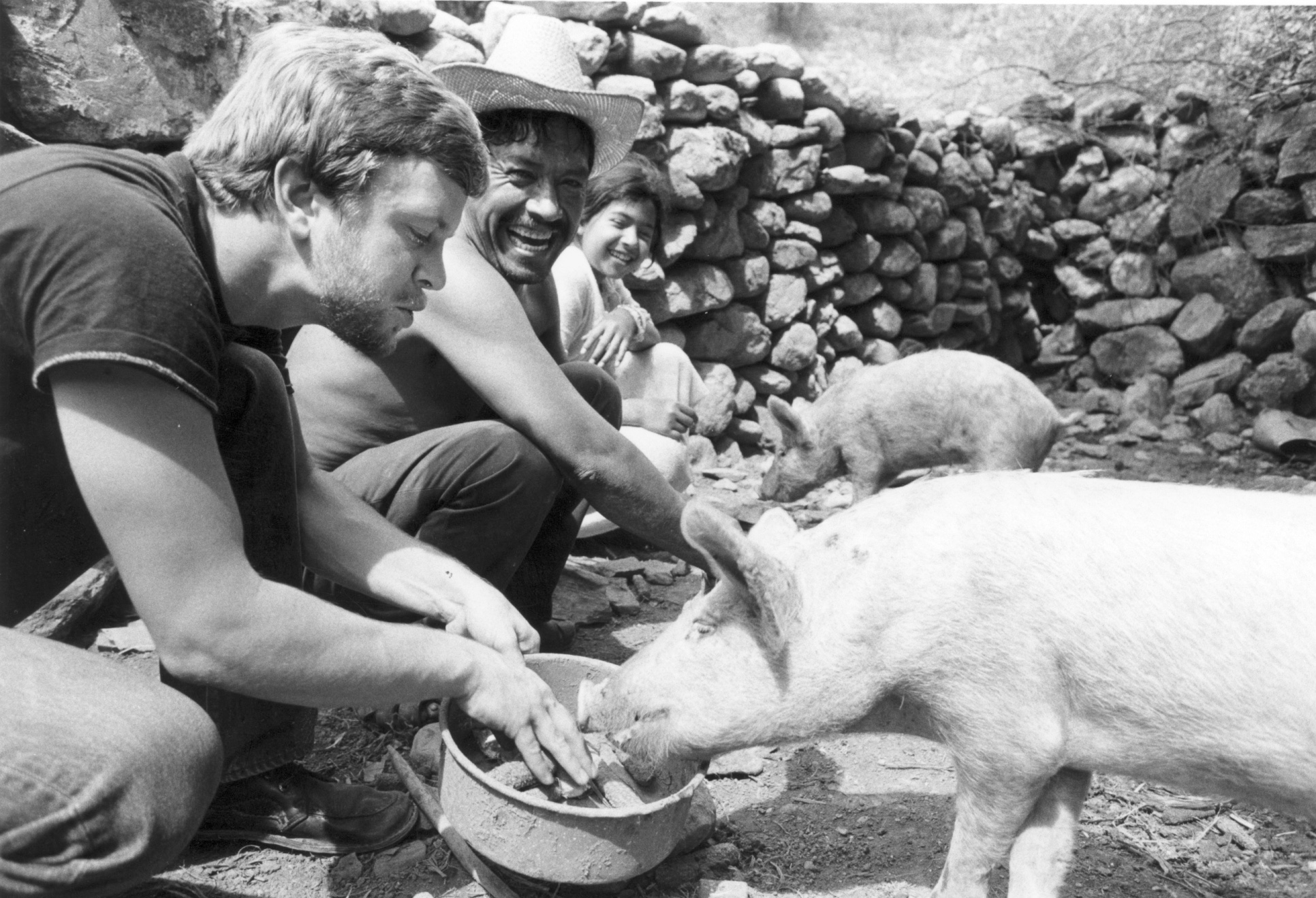
Ted Conover in Ahuacatlán de Guadalupe, Querétaro, Mexico. Photo by Philip Decker, 1984.

Conover spent two years at Cambridge University after writing Rolling Nowhere. Building on his encounters while riding the rails with Mexican undocumented immigrants whom he described as "the true modern-day incarnation of the classic American hobo," Conover next spent a year traveling with Mexican migrants as research for what would become his 1987 book Coyotes: A Journey Across Borders with America's Mexican Migrants. During this year, he lived in a "feeder" valley in the Mexican state of Querétaro, spent time in Arizona, Idaho, California, and Florida, and crossed the US-Mexico border three times.

Conover next set his sights on the wealthy subculture of the mining-town-turned-lifestyle-capital of Aspen, Colorado, where he worked as a driver for the Mellow Yellow Taxi Company, for a catering company, and as a reporter for the Aspen Times in the late 1980s. His experiences were the basis for his 1991 book Whiteout: Lost in Aspen.

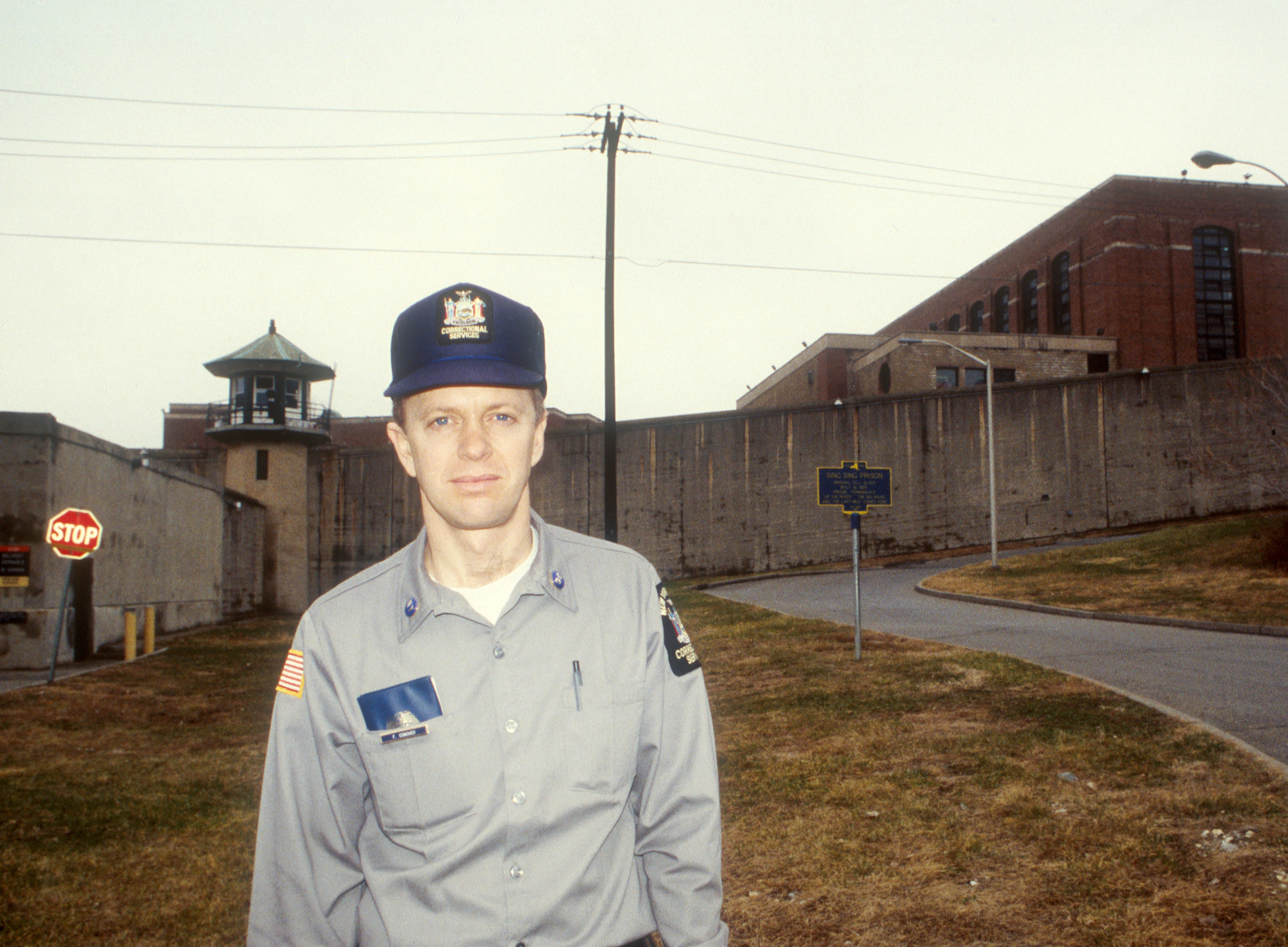
Ted Conover outside Sing Sing

He moved to the East Coast in the 1990s and began writing for national publications such as The New Yorker and The New York Times Magazine. In the mid-1990s, amidst skyrocketing rates of incarceration, he applied for work as a New York State corrections officer. He sought this position after the New York State Department of Corrections denied his request to shadow the department's employees in a journalistic role. Hired in 1997, Conover went through seven weeks of corrections officer training in Albany, New York, and then spent nearly a year working at Sing Sing prison in various entry-level custody posts throughout the prison. After resigning, Conover recounted his experiences in an article for The New Yorker and more fully in his 2000 book Newjack: Guarding Sing Sing. Newjack was awarded the 2000 National Book Critics Circle Award in General Nonfiction and was a finalist for the 2001 Journalism General Nonfiction category of the Pulitzer Prize. The book was initially banned by the New York State Department of Corrections and could be confiscated from prisoner mail, but was later allowed on the condition that pages considered a threat to security be redacted prior to prisoners receiving the book. As of 2019, Newjack was still banned in Arizona, Kansas, and Missouri state prisons.

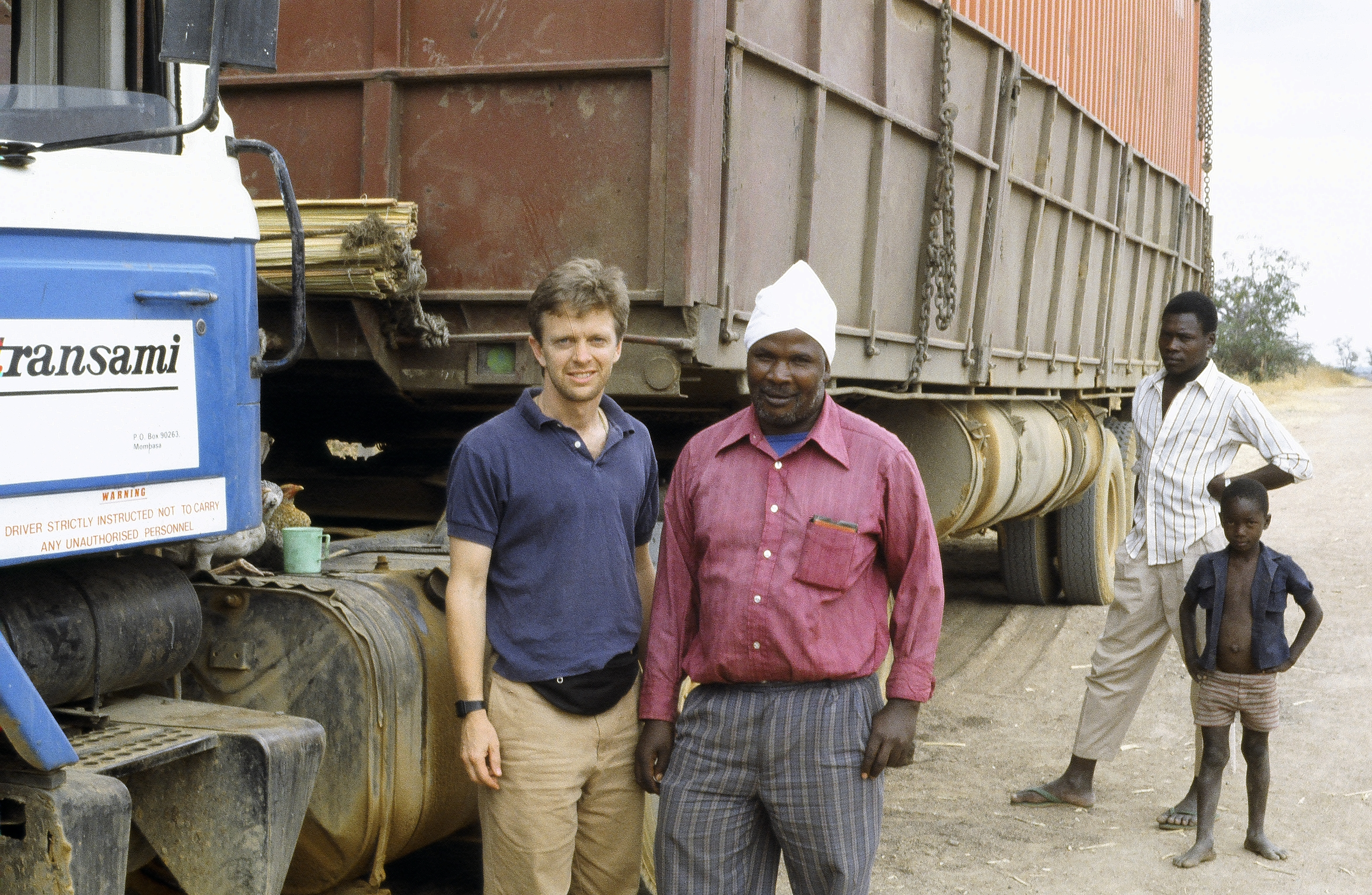
Ted Conover with Kenyan truck driver

Conover's work for his next book—his 2011 The Routes of Man: Travels in the Paved World—focused on a central theme as observed across multiple continents: the role of roads and connectedness in shaping different aspects of human society. His research for this book took him to the Andes, East Africa and West Africa, the Middle East, China, and the Himalayas.

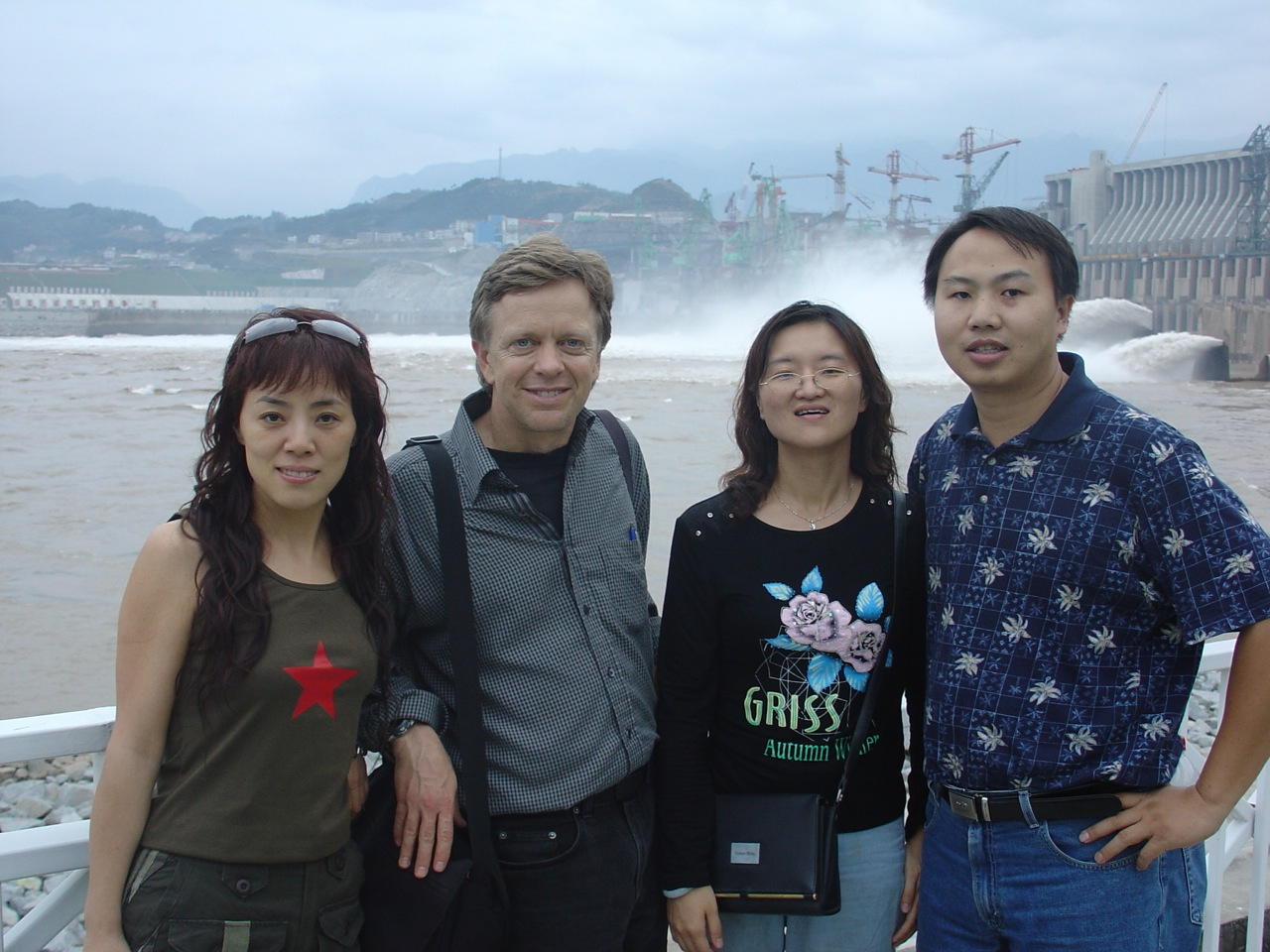
Ted Conover at Three Gorges Dam

In 2016 Conover published his book Immersion: A Writer's Guide To Going Deep as part of the University of Chicago Press Chicago Guides to Writing, Editing, and Publishing series. In this book he focuses on the approach to writing he has developed over three decades of his career, touching on the practical and ethical challenges of immersive reporting, and citing examples from his own work and that of other writers such as Sebastian Junger, Anne Fadiman, Susan Orlean, and Jon Krakauer.

Conover has explored additional subcultures and topics in articles for magazines such as The New York Times Magazine, The New Yorker, Harper's Magazine, The Atlantic Monthly, Vanity Fair, T Magazine, National Geographic Magazine, Outside, Travel + Leisure, Smithsonian Magazine, and 5280. During the autumn of 2012, Conover worked as a United States Department of Agriculture inspector and wrote about his beef inspection work at the Cargill Meat Solutions plant in Schuyler, Nebraska in the May 2013 issue of Harper's Magazine.

In August 2019 Harper's also published his long-form journalism piece "The Last Frontier: Homesteaders on the Margins of America." It recounts his work as a rural outreach volunteer in Colorado’s expansive San Luis Valley for a local group called La Puente. That was the beginning of his most recent book, Cheap Land Colorado: Off-Gridders at America’s Edge (Knopf, 2022). Conover bought a small camper trailer and for two years rented space for it on a corner of a five-acre lot owned by the Gruber family, who were raising five daughters on the prairie. Eventually he bought his own five acres and set to work fixing up an old mobile home that had been abandoned there. “My investment wasn’t very large, but it did mark a big change in my status, at least in my mind, from frequent visitor to, well, neighbor,” he wrote. Cheap Land Colorado was named one of the Best Books of 2022 by The New Yorker and one of “50 Notable Works of Nonfiction 2022” by The Washington Post.

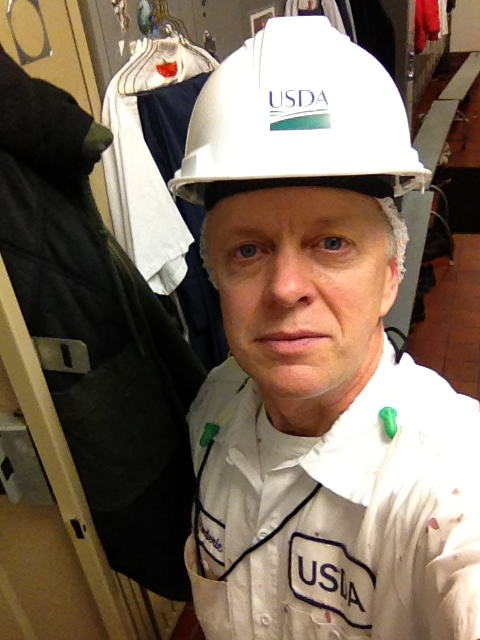
Ted Conover as meat inspector

Conover has performed several times on stage for The Moth and has been interviewed in podcasts and other forums. He sits on the editorial board of the literary magazine The Common based at Amherst College.

=== Immersion approach ===
Conover expresses commitment to academic and journalistic rigor but also embraces some degree of experimentation in nonfiction writing, stating that "[l]iterature stays alive when it's open to new approaches." His research methods position him as an active participant within a subculture of interest. He has been called a "participatory journalist, living as closely as possible the lives of the people he was writing about." In 2010, he told The Denver Post:

When I was still in college, I started thinking about how the immersive research of ethnography might be combined with the topicality and accessibility of journalism. For me, participation is a way of moving beyond the formal constraints of an interview and gaining access to insider perspectives.

His first experiment with this melding of anthropological and journalistic methods began in 1980, when he rode freight railroads across the western United States with railroad tramps, or hobos, as research for the senior thesis that would become his first book. Through this experience Conover discovered that immersive research enables a writer to discover "a whole new set of questions" by which to organize life and priorities, adding more depth and authenticity to the writing that is produced.

Conover's books of narrative nonfiction have typically been studies of little-known social groups and often provide some historical and sociological context. For example, in Newjack: Guarding Sing Sing Conover intersperses ethnographic and memoir-style observations from his work at Sing Sing prison with anecdotes of early American penological history to elucidate the social forces that have shaped American prisons over time. Conover states he is "proud that Newjack found readers both among prison reform advocates and corrections officers," illustrating his interest in creating works of writing that appeal to readers and experts from diverse backgrounds.

During his undergraduate years Conover was trained in an academic writing style that uses the third-person point of view, but he has since developed a first-person voice that is more suited to immersive research and narrative nonfiction. Authors who have inspired Conover include Walt Whitman, Jack London, George Orwell, John Steinbeck, Stanley Booth, Bruce Chatwin, Anne Tyler, Anne Fadiman, and Tom Wolfe.

Conover's technique blends ethnography, journalism, and memoir, and builds upon the 1960s and 70s innovations of New Journalism. According to Kutztown University of Pennsylvania English professor Patrick Walters, Conover "navigates the fuzzy border between journalism and memoir, forging his own brand of immersion with a delicate balance of the two, while mostly letting the subjects speak for themselves." Conover emphasizes the difference between immersion research and undercover investigation work, viewing himself as a practitioner of the former more than the latter.

Conover has been credited with establishing the modern standards for literary and immersion journalism. He advocates applying multidisciplinary research and narrative techniques to uncover the complexities of individual experience. A description of a Journalism of Empathy course taught by Conover at New York University reads:

Empathy in narrative has roots in some of the earliest written stories—what is a literary character, after all, if not an imagining of the world through someone else's eyes? But empathy is not exclusively the tool of novelists and playwrights. In our time, journalists . . . have used a fiercely empathetic approach to create memorable and powerful nonfiction, often with social justice concerns. This course will survey the history and current practice of empathetic writing, focusing on seminal readings but looking briefly at links to literature, psychology, neuroscience, and human rights.

In his 2016 book Immersion: A Writer's Guide to Going Deep Conover discusses balancing the truth-seeking duties of a reporter with the more personalized narrative styles of memoir and empathetic journalism. In an interview with Creative Nonfiction magazine, Conover also explained how he balances journalistic integrity with fairness and sensitivity to those with whom he interacts while doing immersion research:

You find a middle ground between the strict newspaper rule—the subject never sees the story in advance—and the almost equally strict academic rule that the subject gets anonymized and approves everything.

As Conover's name has become more well-known, he has sometimes had to adapt his immersion research technique, since he lacks the anonymity he had earlier in his career.

=== Teaching career ===
Conover began teaching writing at summer sessions including the Aspen Summer Words Festival, Writers at Work, the Santa Fe Writers Conference, the Sun Valley Writers Conference, and the Sarah Lawrence Summer Seminar for Writers. He served on the nonfiction faculty of the Bread Loaf Writers' Conference nine times between 1989 and 2015, and taught at Bread Loaf in Sicily in 2017. In 2005 he took a position as Distinguished Writer in Residence at the Arthur L. Carter Journalism Institute of New York University. In 2013 he was named Associated Professor and in 2017 Full Professor. Conover served as the Institute's director from 2018 to 2021. In 2025 he was named Professor Emeritus. He has taught undergraduate and graduate-level courses including "Ethnography for Journalists", "Longform Narrative", "Undercover Reporting", "The Journalism of Empathy", and "Varieties of the First Person". In 2021 he received the Golden Dozen teaching award from NYU's College of Arts and Sciences. Conover has also taught courses for the University of Oregon and the John F. Kennedy School of Government at Harvard University.

Although Conover teaches formal writing courses, he also encourages aspiring writers to "spend time away from the academy." He acknowledges limits to what can be taught in a classroom setting:

Your work [may] be stressful and … ugly at times, but it will teach you something valuable. The necessary tools are common to many nonfiction writers: the ability to listen, to ask good questions, to take notes, to find ways to tell a story and not simply file a report, to get to know people well enough that they become characters. You can't shy away from conflict, which will be interesting to read about. You need a hunger for different experiences...

Conover identifies narrative structure and effective use of digression as two of the more challenging concepts to teach students.

== Awards and honors ==
=== Awards and prizes ===
- Minnesota Press Association Award for Best Feature Writing (1996)
- Lowell Thomas Travel Writing Awards (1997)
- National Book Critics Circle Award for General Nonfiction (2000)
- Finalist for the Pulitzer Prize in General Nonfiction (2001)
- Honorary doctorate (Litt.D), Amherst College (2001)
- Evil Companions Literary Club Award (2011)
- New York University College of Arts & Science Golden Dozen Teaching Award (2020)

=== Fellowships ===
- Marshall Scholarship (1982–1984)
- Visiting fellow at Harvard Kennedy School Institute of Politics (2000)
- Guggenheim Fellowship (2003)

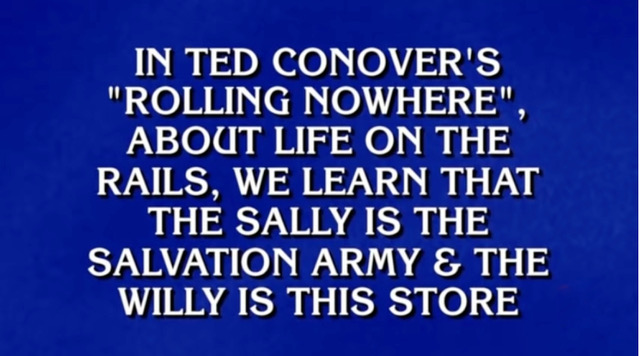
Screenshot of 2021 Jeopardy! reference to Conover's work

=== Jeopardy! ===
Conover's work has twice been an answer on the television game show Jeopardy!:

- On October 26, 2021, the category was "Literary Journalism" and the answer came from Rolling Nowhere.
- On October 15, 2003, the answer was drawn from Newjack and appeared in the category "Tough Jobs".

== Written works ==
=== Books ===
- Rolling Nowhere: Riding the Rails with America's Hoboes (1984)
- Coyotes: A Journey Across Borders with America's Mexican Migrants (1987)
- Whiteout: Lost In Aspen (1991)
- Newjack: Guarding Sing Sing (2000)
- The Routes of Man: Travels in the Paved World (2010)
- Immersion: A Writer's Guide to Going Deep (2016)
- Cheap Land Colorado: Off-Gridders at America's Edge (2022)

=== Notable articles ===
Conover has published over seventy articles. Several have received awards:

- "The Road Is Very Unfair" (The New Yorker), an account of five weeks' travel with truck drivers from Kenya identified as likely carriers of HIV, was selected by Tracy Kidder for Best American Essays 1994 and included in Literary Journalism, ed. Sims and Singer.
- "Hacking," his 1996 Wired Magazine article about a hatchet murderer who became a software entrepreneur while in prison, was reprinted in Minnesota Monthly as "Making a Killing" and won the Minnesota Press Association award for best feature writing.
- "Cowboy Christmas" and "Learning the Ropes," both published in Travel + Leisure, won the Lowell Thomas travel writing award and were reprinted in Grand Tour: The Journal of Travel Writing, Winter, 1997.
- "The Way of All Flesh" (Harper's Magazine), about six weeks spent working undercover as a USDA red meat inspector, was finalist for the National Magazine Award in Reporting in 2014.
