= The Year of Living Biblically =

2007 book by A. J. Jacobs

The Year of Living Biblically: One Man's Humble Quest to follow the Bible as Literally as Possible
- Front cover of the hardcover edition
- Author: A. J. Jacobs
- Language: English
- Subject: Old Testament, New Testament, Judaism, Christianity
- Publisher: Simon & Schuster
- Publication date: 2007
- Publication place: United States
- ISBN: 0-7432-9147-6
- OCLC: 86038134
- Dewey Decimal: 220 22
- LC Class: BS511.3 .J33 2007

The Year of Living Biblically: One Man's Humble Quest to follow the Bible as Literally as Possible is a book by A. J. Jacobs, an editor at Esquire magazine, published in 2007. The book describes a year that the author said he spent trying to follow all the rules and guidelines he could find in the Bible, which turned out to be more than 700.

== Summary ==
In the book, Jacobs discusses biblical rules, both the obscure and the well-known, and tries to follow them as literally as possible. He even attempts to stone an adulterer and to offer animal sacrifice. He also goes to visit numerous religious groups in order to show their particular views on the Bible, as well as their methods of worship. Some of the people Jacobs meets and talks to in the book:

- An Amish family in Lancaster County, Pennsylvania
- Ken Ham of the Creation Museum in Petersburg, Kentucky
- Rabbi Robbie Harris of the Jewish Theological Seminary of America in Manhattan, New York City
- A proselytizing Jehovah's Witness
- Hassidic Jews in Brooklyn, New York City
- Members of the New York City Atheists
- Dean Hubbard of Mississippi who is working on growing the Red Heifer in cooperation with Chaim Richman of the Temple Institute in Israel
- A Bedouin shepherd in the Negev desert
- Benyamim Tsedaka of the Samaritan community in Holon, Israel
- A pastor at Jerry Falwell's Thomas Road Baptist Church in Lynchburg, Virginia
- Ralph Blair of Evangelicals Concerned, an organization for gay and gay-friendly evangelicals
- Pastor Tony Campolo, leader of the Red-Letter Christian movement
- Pastor Jimmy Morrow of the Church of God with Signs Following in Del Rio, Tennessee, who practices snake handling in his sermons

== Adaptation ==
In 2007 it was reported that the book was being adapted into a feature film to be produced by Paramount Pictures and Brad Pitt's Plan B production company and directed by Julian Farino. However, in late October 2015 it was announced that CBS Television had secured the rights and would begin production on a TV series. In May 2017, CBS picked up a TV series based on the book with the working title By the Book. Under title Living Biblically, the series began airing on CBS on February 26, 2018, but was canceled after its first season, with 13 episodes airing.
