= Eleventh edition of the Encyclopædia Britannica =

1910 encyclopaedia

Encyclopædia Britannica Eleventh Edition
- First page of the Encyclopædia Britannica, Eleventh Edition
- Language: British English
- Release number: 11
- Subject: General
- Publisher: Horace Everett Hooper
- Publication date: 1910–1911
- Publication place: United States
- Media type: Print and digital
- Preceded by: Encyclopædia Britannica Tenth Edition
- Followed by: Encyclopædia Britannica Twelfth Edition (supplementary update), Encyclopædia Britannica Fourteenth Edition (full revision)
- Text: Encyclopædia Britannica; Eleventh Edition at Wikisource

The eleventh edition of the Encyclopædia Britannica (1910–1911) is a 29-volume reference work. It was developed during the encyclopaedia's transition from a British to an American publication. Some of its articles were written by the best-known scholars of the time. This edition of the encyclopaedia, containing 40,000 entries, has entered the public domain and is readily available on the Internet. Its use in modern scholarship and as a reliable source has been deemed problematic due to the outdated nature of some of its content. Nevertheless, the 11th edition has retained considerable value as a time capsule of scientific and historical information, as well as scholarly attitudes of the era immediately preceding World War I.

== Background ==
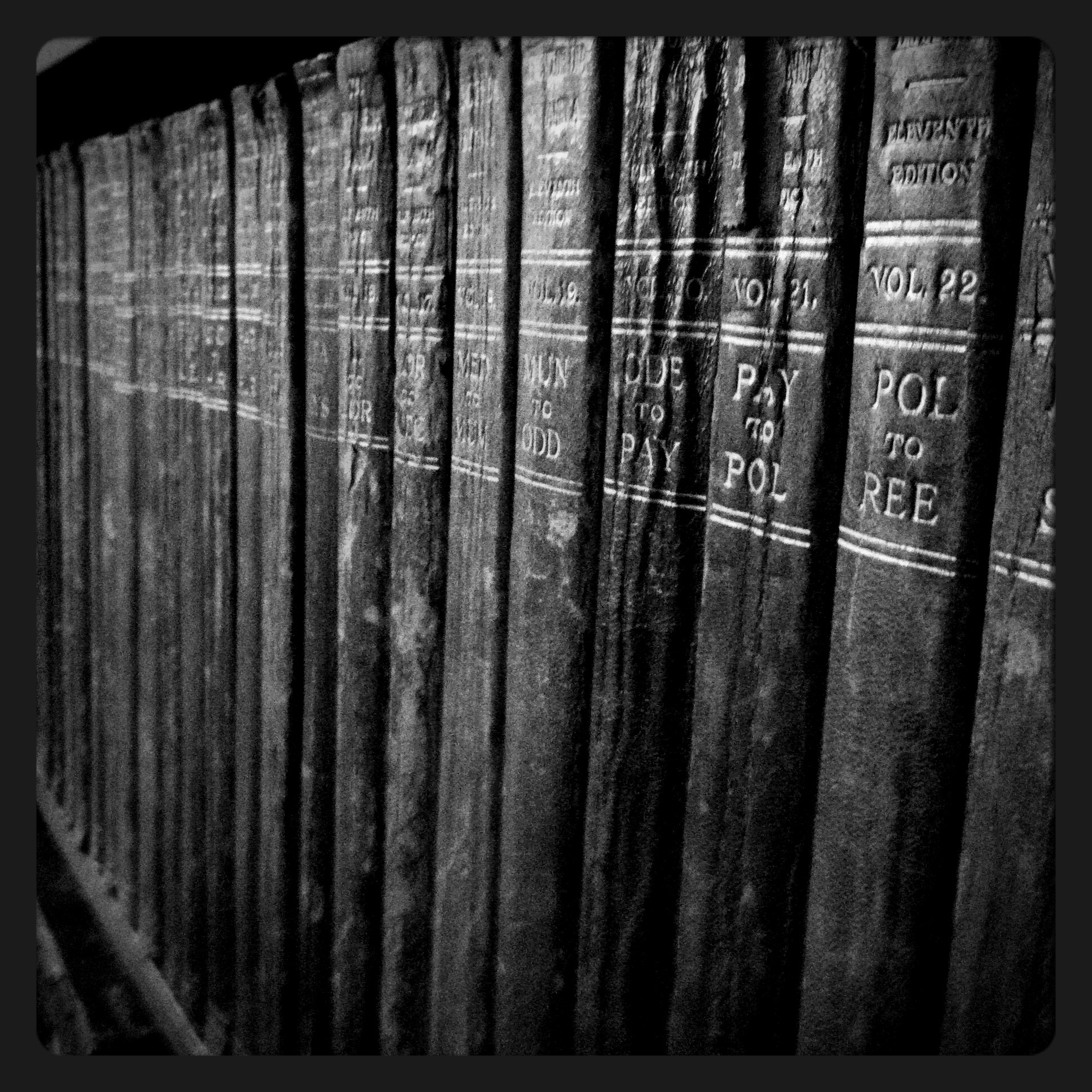
Encyclopædia Britannica Eleventh Edition

The 1911 eleventh edition was assembled with the management of American publisher Horace Everett Hooper. Hugh Chisholm, who had edited the previous edition, was appointed editor-in-chief, with Walter Alison Phillips as his principal assistant editor.

Originally, Hooper bought the rights to the 25-volume 9th edition and persuaded the British newspaper The Times to issue its reprint, with eleven additional volumes (35 volumes total), as the tenth edition, which was published in 1902. Hooper's association with The Times ceased in 1909, and he negotiated with Cambridge University Press to publish the 29-volume eleventh edition. Though it is generally perceived as a quintessentially British work, the eleventh edition had substantial American influences, in not only the increased amount of American and Canadian content, but also the efforts made to make it more popular. American marketing methods also assisted sales. Some 14% of the contributors (214 of 1507) were from North America, and a New York office was established to coordinate their work.

The initials of the encyclopaedia's contributors appear at the end of selected articles or at the end of a section in the case of longer articles, such as that on China, and a key is given in each volume to these initials. Some articles were written by the best-known scholars of the time, such as Edmund Gosse, J. B. Bury, Algernon Charles Swinburne, John Muir, Peter Kropotkin, T. H. Huxley, James Hopwood Jeans and William Michael Rossetti. Among the then lesser-known contributors were some who would later become distinguished, such as Ernest Rutherford and Bertrand Russell. Many articles were carried over from the 9th edition, some with minimal updating. Some of the book-length articles were divided into smaller parts for easier reference, yet others were much abridged. The best-known authors generally contributed only a single article or part of an article. Most of the work was done by journalists, British Museum scholars and other scholars. The 1911 edition was the first edition of the encyclopaedia to include more than just a handful of female contributors, with 34 women contributing articles to the edition. These included Adelaide Anderson, Gertrude Bell, Margaret Bryant, Constance Jocelyn Ffoulkes, Harriette Lombard Hennessy, and Eleanor Mildred Sidgwick.

The eleventh edition introduced a number of changes of the format of the Britannica. It was the first to be published complete, instead of the previous method of volumes being released as they were ready. The print type was kept in galley proofs and subject to continual updating until publication. It was the first edition of Britannica to be issued with a comprehensive index volume in which was added a categorical index, where like topics were listed. It was the first not to include long treatise-length articles. Even though the overall length of the work was about the same as that of its predecessor, the number of articles had increased from 17,000 to 40,000. It was also the first edition of Britannica to include biographies of living people. Sixteen maps of the famous 9th edition of Stielers Handatlas were exclusively translated to English, converted to imperial units, printed in Gotha, Germany, by Justus Perthes, and the maps became a part of this edition. Later editions only included Perthes' maps as low-quality reproductions.

According to Coleman and Simmons, the content of the encyclopaedia was distributed as follows:

Subject	Content
Geography	29%
Science	17%
History	17%
Literature	11%
Fine art	9%
Social science	7%
Psychology	1.7%
Philosophy	0.8%

Hooper sold the rights to Sears, Roebuck and Company of Chicago in 1920, completing the Britannica's transition to becoming a substantially American publication. In 1922, an additional three volumes (also edited by Hugh Chisholm) were published, covering the events of the intervening years, including World War I. These, together with a reprint of the eleventh edition, formed the twelfth edition of the work. A similar thirteenth edition, consisting of three volumes plus a reprint of the twelfth edition, was published in 1926. The London editor was J. L. Garvin, as Chisholm had died. The twelfth and thirteenth editions were closely related to the eleventh edition and shared much of the same content. However, it became increasingly apparent that a more thorough update of the work was required.

The fourteenth edition, published in 1929, was considerably revised, with much text eliminated or abridged to make room for new topics. Nevertheless, the eleventh edition was the basis of every later version of the Encyclopædia Britannica until the completely new fifteenth edition was published in 1974, using modern information presentation.

The eleventh edition's articles are still of value and interest to modern readers and scholars, especially as a cultural artifact: the British Empire was at its maximum, imperialism was largely unchallenged, much of the world was still ruled by monarchs, and the tumultuous world wars were still in the future. They are a resource for topics omitted from modern encyclopaedias, particularly for biography and the history of science and technology. As a literary text, the encyclopaedia has value as an example of early 20th-century prose. For example, it employs literary devices, such as pathetic fallacy (attribution of human-like traits to impersonal forces or inanimate objects), which are not as common in modern reference texts.

== Reviews ==
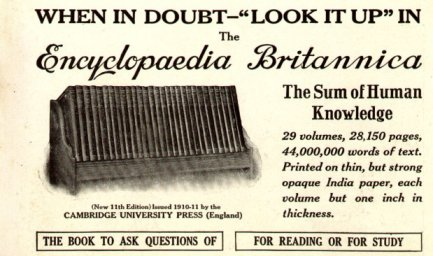
1913 advertisement for the eleventh edition

In 1917, using the pseudonym of S. S. Van Dine, the US art critic and author Willard Huntington Wright published Misinforming a Nation, a 200+ page criticism of inaccuracies and biases of the Encyclopædia Britannica eleventh edition. Wright claimed that Britannica was "characterized by misstatements, inexcusable omissions, rabid and patriotic prejudices, personal animosities, blatant errors of fact, scholastic ignorance, gross neglect of non-British culture, an astounding egotism, and an undisguised contempt for American progress".

Amos Urban Shirk, known for having read the eleventh and fourteenth editions in their entirety, said he found the fourteenth edition to be a "big improvement" over the eleventh, stating that "most of the material had been completely rewritten".

Robert Collison, in Encyclopaedias: Their History Throughout The Ages (1966), wrote of the eleventh edition that it "was probably the finest edition of the Britannica ever issued, and it ranks with the Enciclopedia Italiana and the Espasa as one of the three greatest encyclopaedias. It was the last edition to be produced almost in its entirety in Britain, and its position in time as a summary of the world's knowledge just before the outbreak of World War I is particularly valuable".

Sir Kenneth Clark, in Another Part of the Wood (1974), wrote of the eleventh edition, "One leaps from one subject to another, fascinated as much by the play of mind and the idiosyncrasies of their authors as by the facts and dates. It must be the last encyclopaedia in the tradition of Diderot which assumes that information can be made memorable only when it is slightly coloured by prejudice. When T. S. Eliot wrote 'Soul curled up on the window seat reading the Encyclopædia Britannica,' he was certainly thinking of the eleventh edition." (Clark refers to Eliot's 1929 poem "Animula".) It was one of Jorge Luis Borges's favourite works, and was a source of information and enjoyment for his entire working life.

In 1912, mathematician L. C. Karpinski criticised the eleventh edition for inaccuracies in articles on the history of mathematics, none of which had been written by specialists.

English writer and former priest Joseph McCabe claimed in Lies and Fallacies of the Encyclopædia Britannica (1947) that Britannica was censored under pressure from the Roman Catholic Church after the 11th edition. Initially, the eleventh edition received criticism from members of the Roman Catholic Church, who accused it of misrepresenting and being biased against Catholics. The most "vociferous" American Catholic critics of the eleventh edition were editors of the Christian magazine America.

Authorities ranging from Virginia Woolf to professors criticised the 11th edition for having bourgeois and old-fashioned opinions on art, literature, and social sciences. A contemporary Cornell professor, Edward B. Titchener, wrote in 1912, "the new Britannica does not reproduce the psychological atmosphere of its day and generation ... Despite the halo of authority, and despite the scrutiny of the staff, the great bulk of the secondary articles in general psychology ... are not adapted to the requirements of the intelligent reader".

In an April 2012 article, Nate Pederson of The Guardian said that the eleventh edition represented "a peak of colonial optimism before the slaughter of war" and that the edition "has acquired an almost mythic reputation among collectors".

Critics have charged several editions with racism, sexism, and antisemitism. The eleventh edition characterises the Ku Klux Klan as protecting the white race and restoring order to the American South after the American Civil War, citing the need to "control the negro", and "the frequent occurrence of the crime of rape by negro men upon white women". Similarly, the "Civilization" article argues for eugenics, stating that it is irrational to "propagate low orders of intelligence, to feed the ranks of paupers, defectives and criminals ... which to-day constitute so threatening an obstacle to racial progress". The eleventh edition has no biography of Marie Curie, despite her winning the Nobel Prize in Physics in 1903 and the Nobel Prize in Chemistry in 1911, although she is mentioned briefly under the biography of her husband Pierre Curie. The Britannica employed a large female editorial staff who wrote hundreds of articles for which they were not given credit.

== Public domain ==
The 1911 edition is no longer restricted by copyright, and it is therefore freely available in several more modern forms. While it may once have been a reliable description of the academic consensus of its time, many modern readers find fault with the Encyclopedia for several major errors, ethnocentric and racist remarks, and other issues:

- Contemporary opinions of race and ethnicity are included in the Encyclopædia's articles. For example, the entry for "Negro" states, "Mentally the negro is inferior to the white ... the arrest or even deterioration of mental development [after adolescence] is no doubt very largely due to the fact that after puberty sexual matters take the first place in the negro's life and thoughts." The article about the American Revolutionary War attributes the success of the United States in part to "a population mainly of good English blood and instincts".
- Many articles are now outdated factually, in particular those concerning science, technology, international and municipal law, and medicine.
- Even where the facts might still be accurate, new information, theories and perspectives developed since 1911 have substantially changed the way the same facts might be interpreted. For example, the modern interpretation of the history of the Visigoths is now very different from that of 1911; readers of the eleventh edition who want to know about the social customs and political life of the tribe and its warriors are told to look up the entry for their king, Alaric I.

The eleventh edition of Encyclopædia Britannica has become a commonly quoted source, both because of the reputation of the Britannica and because it is now in the public domain and has been made available on the Internet. It has been used as a source by many modern projects, including Wikipedia and the Project Gutenberg Encyclopedia.

== Project Gutenberg Encyclopedia ==
The Project Gutenberg Encyclopedia is the eleventh edition of the Encyclopædia Britannica, renamed to address Britannica's trademark concerns. Project Gutenberg's offerings are summarized below in the External links section and include text and graphics. As of 2026, Distributed Proofreaders are working on producing a complete electronic edition of the 1911 Encyclopædia Britannica.

== See also ==
- Catholic Encyclopedia
- New American Cyclopedia

Internet Archive – Text Archives Individual Volumes
Volume	From	To
Volume 1	A	Androphagi
Volume 2	Andros, Sir Edmund	Austria
Volume 3	Austria, Lower	Bisectrix
Volume 4	Bishārīn	Calgary
Volume 5	Calhoun, John Caldwell	Chatelaine
Volume 6	Châtelet	Constantine
Volume 7	Constantine Pavlovich	Demidov
Volume 8	Demijohn	Edward the Black Prince
Volume 9	Edwardes, Sir Herbert Benjamin	Evangelical Association
Volume 10	Evangelical Church Conference	Francis Joseph I
Volume 11	Franciscans	Gibson, William Hamilton
Volume 12	Gichtel, Johann Georg	Harmonium
Volume 13	Harmony	Hurstmonceaux
Volume 14	Husband	Italic
Volume 15	Italy	Kyshtym
Volume 16	L	Lord Advocate
Volume 17	Lord Chamberlain	Mecklenburg
Volume 18	Medal	Mumps
Volume 19	Mun, Adrien Albert Marie de	Oddfellows, Order of
Volume 20	Ode	Payment of members
Volume 21	Payn, James	Polka
Volume 22	Poll	Reeves, John Sims
Volume 23	Refectory	Sainte-Beuve, Charles Augustin
Volume 24	Sainte-Claire Deville, Étienne Henri	Shuttle
Volume 25	Shuválov, Peter Andreivich	Subliminal self
Volume 26	Submarine mines	Tom-Tom
Volume 27	Tonalite	Vesuvius
Volume 28	Vetch	Zymotic diseases
Volume 29	Index	List of contributors
Volume 1 of 1922 supp	Abbe	English History
Volume 2 of 1922 supp	English Literature	Oyama, Iwao
Volume 3 of 1922 supp	Pacific Ocean Islands	Zuloaga
Volume 1 of 1926 supp	Aaland Islands	Eye
Volume 2 of 1926 supp	Fabre	Oyama
Volume 3 of 1926 supp	Pacific	Zuyder Zee
Reader's Guide – 1913		
Year-Book – 1913		

Project Gutenberg Encyclopedia As of 16 December 2014
Section	From		To
Volume 1:	A	–	Androphagi
Volume 2.1:	Andros, Sir Edmund	–	Anise
Volume 2.2:	Anjar	–	Apollo
Volume 2.3:	Apollodorus	–	Aral
Volume 2.4:	Aram, Eugene	–	Arcueil
Volume 2.5:	Arculf	–	Armour, Philip
Volume 2.6:	Armour Plates	–	Arundel, Earls of
Volume 2.7:	Arundel, Thomas	–	Athens
Volume 2.8:	Atherstone	–	Austria
Volume 3.1:	Austria, Lower	–	Bacon
Volume 3.2:	Baconthorpe	–	Bankruptcy
Volume 3.3:	Banks	–	Bassoon
Volume 3.4:	Basso-relievo	–	Bedfordshire
Volume 3.5:	Bedlam	–	Benson, George
Volume 3.6:	Bent, James	–	Bibirine
Volume 3.7:	Bible	–	Bisectrix
Volume 4.1:	Bisharin	–	Bohea
Volume 4.2:	Bohemia	–	Borgia, Francis
Volume 4.3:	Borgia, Lucrezia	–	Bradford, John
Volume 4.4:	Bradford, William	–	Brequigny, Louis
Volume 4.5:	Bréquigny	–	Bulgaria
Volume 4.6:	Bulgaria	–	Calgary
Volume 5.1:	Calhoun	–	Camoens
Volume 5.2:	Camorra	–	Cape Colony
Volume 5.3:	Capefigue	–	Carneades
Volume 5.4:	Carnegie, Andrew	–	Casus Belli
Volume 5.5:	Cat	–	Celt
Volume 5.6:	Celtes, Konrad	–	Ceramics
Volume 5.7:	Cerargyrite	–	Charing Cross
Volume 5.8:	Chariot	–	Chatelaine
Volume 6.1:	Châtelet	–	Chicago
Volume 6.2:	Chicago, University of	–	Chiton
Volume 6.3:	Chitral	–	Cincinnati
Volume 6.4:	Cincinnatus	–	Cleruchy
Volume 6.5:	Clervaux	–	Cockade
Volume 6.6:	Cockaigne	–	Columbus, Christopher
Volume 6.7:	Columbus	–	Condottiere
Volume 6.8:	Conduction, Electric	–	
Volume 7.1:	Prependix	–	
Volume 7.2:	Constantine Pavlovich	–	Convention
Volume 7.3:	Convention	–	Copyright
Volume 7.4:	Coquelin	–	Costume
Volume 7.5:	Cosway	–	Coucy
Volume 7.6:	Coucy-le-Château	–	Crocodile
Volume 7.7:	Crocoite	–	Cuba
Volume 7.8:	Cube	–	Daguerre, Louis
Volume 7.9:	Dagupan	–	David
Volume 7.10:	David, St	–	Demidov
Volume 8.2:	Demijohn	–	Destructor
Volume 8.3:	Destructors	–	Diameter
Volume 8.4:	Diameter	–	Dinarchus
Volume 8.5:	Dinard	–	Dodsworth
Volume 8.6:	Dodwell	–	Drama
Volume 8.7:	Drama	–	Dublin
Volume 8.8:	Dubner	–	Dyeing
Volume 8.9:	Dyer	–	Echidna
Volume 8.10:	Echinoderma	–	Edward
Volume 9.1:	Edwardes	–	Ehrenbreitstein
Volume 9.2:	Ehud	–	Electroscope
Volume 9.3:	Electrostatics	–	Engis
Volume 9.4:	England	–	English Finance
Volume 9.5:	English History	–	
Volume 9.6:	English Language	–	Epsom Salts
Volume 9.7:	Equation	–	Ethics
Volume 9.8:	Ethiopia	–	Evangelical Association
Volume 10.1:	Evangelical Church Conference	–	Fairbairn, Sir William
Volume 10.2:	Fairbanks, Erastus	–	Fens
Volume 10.3:	Fenton, Edward	–	Finistère
Volume 10.4:	Finland	–	Fleury, Andre
Volume 10.5:	Fleury, Claude	–	Foraker, Joseph Henson
Volume 10.6:	Foraminifera	–	Fox, Edward
Volume 10.7:	Fox, George	–	France[p.775-p.894]
Volume 10.8:	France[p.895-p.929]	–	Francis Joseph I.
Volume 11.1:	Franciscians	–	French Language
Volume 11.2:	French Literature	–	Frost, William
Volume 11.3:	Frost	–	Fyzabad
Volume 11.4:	G	–	Gaskell, Elizabeth
Volume 11.5:	Gassendi, Pierre	–	Geocentric
Volume 11.6:	Geodesy	–	Geometry
Volume 11.7:	Geoponici	–	Germany[p.804-p.840]
Volume 11.8:	Germany[p.841-p.901]	–	Gibson, William
Volume 12.1:	Gichtel, Johann	–	Glory
Volume 12.2:	Gloss	–	Gordon, Charles George
Volume 12.3:	Gordon, Lord George	–	Grasses
Volume 12.4:	Grasshopper	–	Greek Language
Volume 12.5:	Greek Law	–	Ground-Squirrel
Volume 12.6:	Groups, Theory of	–	Gwyniad
Volume 12.7:	Gyantse	–	Hallel
Volume 12.8:	Haller, Albrecht	–	Harmonium
Volume 13.1:	Harmony	–	Heanor
Volume 13.2:	Hearing	–	Helmond
Volume 13.3:	Helmont, Jean	–	Hernosand
Volume 13.4:	Hero	–	Hindu Chronology
Volume 13.5:	Hinduism	–	Home, Earls of
Volume 13.6:	Home, Daniel	–	Hortensius, Quintus
Volume 13.7:	Horticulture	–	Hudson Bay
Volume 13.8:	Hudson River	–	Hurstmonceaux
Volume 14.1:	Husband	–	Hydrolysis
Volume 14.2:	Hydromechanics	–	Ichnography
Volume 14.3:	Ichthyology	–	Independence
Volume 14.4:	Independence, Declaration of	–	Indo-European Languages
Volume 14.5:	Indole	–	Insanity
Volume 14.6:	Inscriptions	–	Ireland, William Henry
Volume 14.7:	Ireland	–	Isabey, Jean Baptiste
Volume 14.8:	Isabnormal Lines	–	Italic
Volume 15.1:	Italy	–	Jacobite Church
Volume 15.2:	Jacobites	–	Japan (part)
Volume 15.3:	Japan (part)	–	Jeveros
Volume 15.4:	Jevons, Stanley	–	Joint
Volume 15.5:	Joints	–	Justinian I.
Volume 15.6:	Justinian II.	–	Kells
Volume 15.7:	Kelly, Edward	–	Kite
Volume 15.8:	Kite-flying	–	Kyshtym
Volume 16.1:	L	–	Lamellibranchia
Volume 16.2:	Lamennais, Robert de	–	Latini, Brunetto
Volume 16.3:	Latin Language	–	Lefebvre, Pierre François Joseph
Volume 16.4:	Lefebvre, Tanneguy	–	Letronne, Jean Antoine
Volume 16.5:	Letter	–	Lightfoot, John
Volume 16.6:	Lightfoot, Joseph Barber	–	Liquidation
Volume 16.7:	Liquid Gases	–	Logar
Volume 16.8:	Logarithm	–	Lord Advocate
Volume 17.1:	Lord Chamberlain	–	Luqmān
Volume 17.2:	Luray Cavern	–	Mackinac Island
Volume 17.3:	McKinley, William	–	Magnetism, Terrestrial
Volume 17.4:	Magnetite	–	Malt
Volume 17.5:	Malta	–	Map, Walter
Volume 17.6:	Map	–	Mars
Volume 17.7:	Mars	–	Matteawan
Volume 17.8:	Matter	–	Mecklenburg
