= Newjack =

2000 non-fiction book by Ted Conover

- Author: Ted Conover
- Publisher: Random House
- Publication date: 2000
- Pages: 336
- ISBN: 9780375501777

Newjack: Guarding Sing Sing is a nonfiction book by journalist and professor Ted Conover published in 2000 by Vintage Books. In the book, Conover recounts his experience of learning firsthand about the New York State prison system by becoming a correctional officer for nearly a year. Conover sought the job of correctional officer after the New York State Department of Correctional Services denied his request to shadow the department's employees in a journalist role.

The main title of the book, Newjack, refers to the nickname given to newly hired and inexperienced correctional officers. Throughout the book Conover divulges the inner workings of the New York State correctional system by recounting his experiences of working in nearly every type of custody post in the prison, from solitary confinement and mental health units to visiting rooms and prisoner transport vehicles. The book begins with his seven-week experience in the department's paramilitary training academy, where the department communicates its values and priorities to new recruits. Conover and other recruits learn that in addition to passing the academic portion of the academy, they must also experience real and direct exposure to chemical agents (tear gas) and complete a timed physical performance test to ensure they are prepared for potential prison workplace conditions and demands. The academy instructors define the job of correctional officers as the "care, custody, and control" of inmates, and Conover explores the ethical aspects of correctional philosophy and training that are not addressed in the academy curriculum through his account of the experience. After his academy graduation, Conover's story continues as he is assigned to various rotating entry-level custody roles throughout the Sing Sing prison.

Conover presents the complex feelings and experiences of a well-educated correctional officer with universal human emotions and flaws working in the challenging prison setting. The chapters present both sympathetic and unpleasant aspects of the behavior, thought processes, and practices of all the stakeholders—prisoners, employees, and contractors—that Conover encounters during his work duties. His writing highlights the boredom, fear, violence, trauma, and psychological dynamics that shape the prison experience for all of these stakeholders on a daily basis.

Newjack was the winner of the 2000 National Book Critics Circle Award in General Nonfiction. It was also a finalist for the Pulitzer Prize in General Nonfiction.
