= Joe Queenan (author) =

American writer (born 1950)

- Born: November 3, 1950 (age 76); Philadelphia, Pennsylvania, U.S.
- Education: Saint Joseph's University
- Occupations: Journalist, author
- Writing career
- Genre: Non-fiction
- Subject: Travel

Joe Queenan (born November 3, 1950) is an American satirist and critic. He is the author of nine books, including Red Lobster, White Trash and the Blue Lagoon and If You’re Talking to Me, Your Career Must Be in Trouble. His memoir Closing Time was a 2009 New York Times Notable Book.

== Life and writings ==
A native of Philadelphia, Pennsylvania, Queenan has written for such publications as Spy Magazine, TV Guide, Movieline, The Guardian, and The New York Times Book Review. He writes the "Moving Targets" column for the Wall Street Journal and regularly writes about movies for The Guardian.

Formerly an editor at Forbes, a staff writer at Barron’s, a television critic at People, and a columnist at TV Guide, GQ, Spy, Smart Money, Men’s Health, Barron’s Online and Movieline, his stories have appeared in the New York Times, Rolling Stone, Esquire, the New Republic, Time, Newsweek, the Washington Post, the Los Angeles Times, the Toronto Globe & Mail, Playboy, Rotarian, Golf Digest, Us, Cosmopolitan, Vogue, Town & Country, Allure, the New York Daily News and New York. His work has appeared overseas in the Independent, the Spectator, the Times of London, and Bon.

Queenan has been a guest on The Late Show with David Letterman, Real Time with Bill Maher, The Daily Show, Today, Good Morning, America, Charlie Rose and Late Night with Conan O'Brien, and appeared more than a dozen times on Politically Incorrect. He regularly writes and hosts radio features for the BBC, and for three years was host of the BBC's Postcard from Gotham.

In 2005, he won a Sports Emmy for his work on HBO's Inside the NFL. He wrote and appeared in three short films for the UK's Channel 4: Mickey Rourke for a Day, My Fair Hugh and So You Wanna Be a Gangster. He has also made a low-budget film about people with maddening addictions, entitled 12 Steps to Death. The experience was recounted in his book The Unkindest Cut. He also is the screenwriter of the award-winning film Top Hate directed by Michael Cain, which was a selection of the Las Vegas International Film and Screenwriting Festival in 2026

His short fiction has appeared in numerous literary magazines, including the North American Review. His snap Internet novella Serb Heat was published online by Mr. Showbiz in 1997.

In 2019, Queenan co-authored with T.J. Elliott his first stage play, the problem comedy Alms, an Equity Showcase production directed by John Clay at TheaterLab in New York City. In 2020, Elliott and Queenan debuted their play Grudges on Zoom, directed by Dora Endre.

Their third collaboration, Genealogy, was part of the 2021 season at Broom Street Theater in Madison Wisconsin. Their fourth collaboration, The Oracle, played at Theater for the New City in May 2022. Queenan's solo comedy, The Counterfeit Moron, premiered in February 2025 as part of the Chain Theater Winter One-Act festival In New York City.

A graduate of St. Joseph's College, he is married, with two children, Bridget, a neuroscientist, and Gordon, a lawyer. He lives in Tarrytown, New York.

== Bibliography ==
- Balsamic Dreams: A Short But Self-Important History of the Baby Boomer Generation, a critique of the Baby Boomers generation ISBN 0805067205
- Red Lobster, White Trash and the Blue Lagoon: Joe Queenan's America, a tour of low-brow American pop culture ISBN 0786863323
- Imperial Caddy: The Rise of Dan Quayle in America and the Decline and Fall of Practically Everything Else, a scathing view of Dan Quayle ISBN 1562829394
- Closing Time, a memoir of Queenan's own abusive, alcoholic father and his bleak working-class upbringing in East Falls. Closing Time was included in The New York Times' list 100 Notable Books of 2009. ISBN 9780670020638
- If You're Talking to me Your Career Must be in Trouble: Movies, Mayhem, and Malice ISBN 0786884606
- The Unkindest Cut: How a Hatchet-Man Critic Made His Own $7,000 Movie and Put It All on His Credit Card ISBN 0786860901
- My Goodness: A Cynic's Short-Lived Search for Sainthood ISBN 0786884665
- Malcontents: The Best Bitter, Cynical, and Satirical Writing in the World ISBN 0762416971
- Queenan Country: A Reluctant Anglophile's Pilgrimage to the Mother Country ISBN 031242521X
- True Believers: The Tragic Inner Life of Sports Fans ISBN 0805069798
- Confessions of a Cineplex Heckler: Celluloid Tirades and Escapades ISBN 0786884649
- One for the Books (2012) ISBN 9780670025824
