= Great Books of the Western World =

Book series published by Encyclopædia Britannica

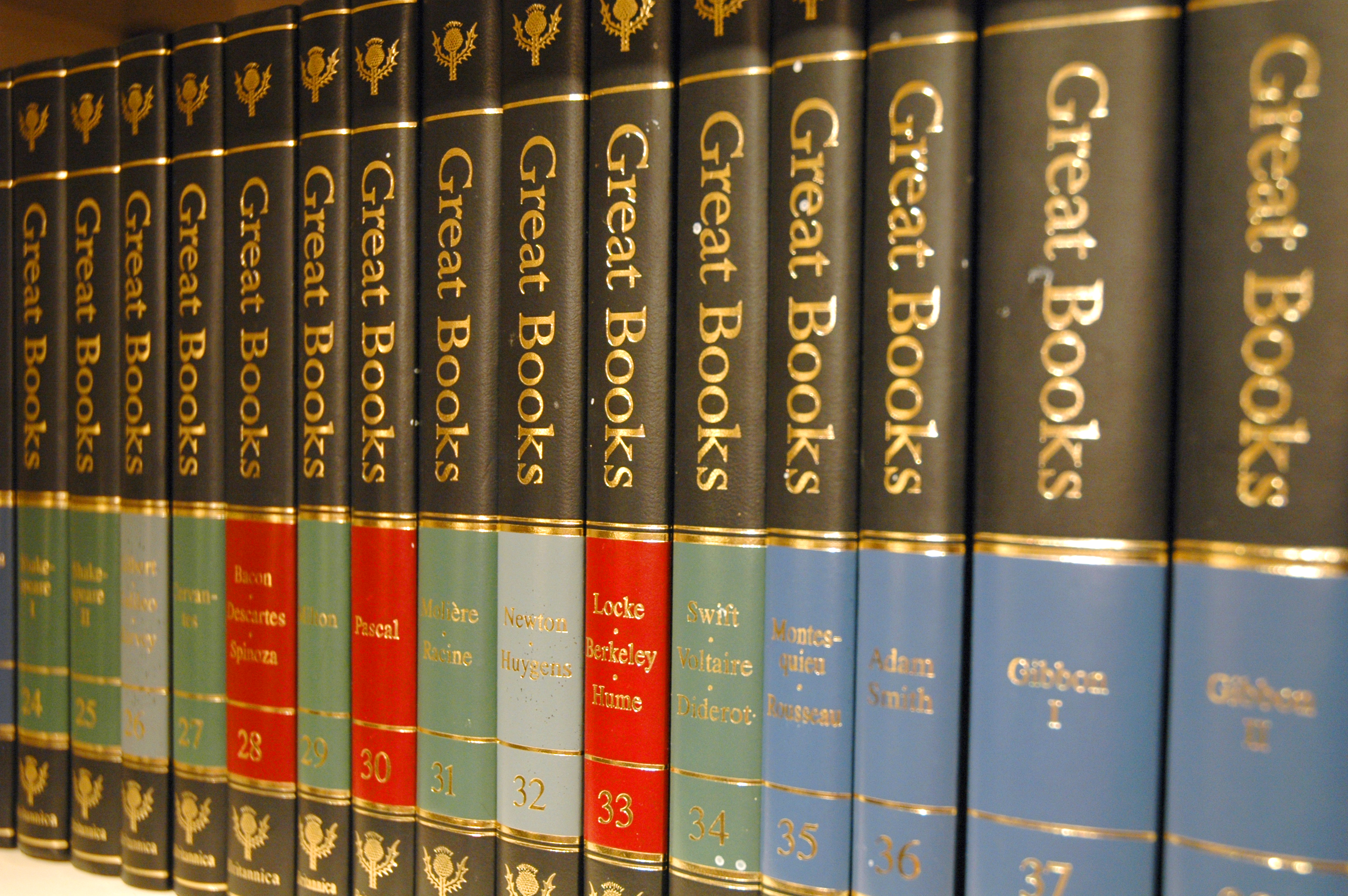
The Great Books (second edition)

Great Books of the Western World is a series of books originally published in the United States in 1952, by Encyclopædia Britannica, Inc., to present the great books in 54 volumes. A second edition was published in 1990, in 60 volumes. Some translations were updated, some works were removed, and there were additions from the 20th century, in six new volumes.

The original editors had three criteria for including a book in the series drawn from Western civilization: the book must be relevant to contemporary matters, and not only important in its historical context; it must be rewarding to re-read repeatedly with respect to liberal education; and it must be a part of "the great conversation about the great ideas", relevant to at least 25 of the 102 "Great Ideas" as identified by the editor of the series's comprehensive index, the Syntopicon, to which they belonged. The books were chosen not on the basis of ethnic and cultural inclusiveness (historical influence being seen as sufficient for inclusion), nor on whether the editors agreed with the authors' views.

== History ==
The project for the Great Books of the Western World began at the University of Chicago, where the president, Robert Hutchins, worked with Mortimer Adler to develop there a course of a type originated by John Erskine at Columbia University in 1921, with the innovation of a "round table" approach to reading and discussing great books among professors and undergraduates—generally aimed at businessmen. The purposes they had in mind were for filling the gaps in their liberal arts education (including Hutchins' own, self-confessed gaps) and to render the reader an intellectually rounded man or woman familiar with the Great Books of the Western canon and knowledgeable of the Great Ideas visited in the "Great Conversation" over the course of three millennia.

An original student of the project was William Benton, who at the time was the chief executive officer of the Encyclopædia Britannica publishing company and later was a United States senator. In 1943, he proposed selecting the greatest books of the Western canon, and that Hutchins and Adler produce unabridged editions for publication by Encyclopædia Britannica. Hutchins was wary at first, fearing that commodifying the books would devalue them as cultural artifacts; but he agreed to the business deal and was paid $60,000 for his work on the project. Benton at first refused the deal on the basis that the set of works selected would be just that, artifacts, never to be read.

By chance, Adler was re-reading a source he was using for a book he was writing at the time, How to Think about War and Peace. He noted to the person who had provided the book for him that he had missed the instructive passage that this person was pointing out to him and wondered why that had happened. They realized that Adler had read the book focusing on one idea about war and peace. Adler struck on the idea of making an index for the whole set for Hutchins, so that readers could have "random access" to the works, with the desired result that they would develop a greater interest in the works.

=== Failure to come to terms ===
After deciding what subjects and authors to include, and how to present the materials, the indexing part of the project was begun, with a budget of another $60,000. Adler began compiling what his group called the "Greek index" bearing on the works selected from ancient Greece, expecting completion of the entire project within six months. After two years, the Greek index was declared to be a resounding failure. The inferior terms under the Great Ideas across the centuries in which the Greek-language works were written had shifted in their significance, and the preliminary index reflected that, the ideas presented not having "come to terms" with each other.

During those times, Adler had a flash of insight. He set his group re-reading each work preliminarily with a single assigned subordinate idea in mind in the form of a fairly elaborate phrase. If any instances of the idea appeared, they could collate them with co-ordinate ideas of a similar type collected the same way, use the material thus noted to better re-frame the larger idea structure and then finally start re-reading the work in its entirety with revised phrasing to do the complete indexing, of ideas.

=== Eventual popular success ===
In 1945, Adler began writing the initial forms of the essays for the Great Ideas and six years and $940,000 more later, on April 15, 1952, the Great Books of the Western World were presented at a publication party in the Waldorf-Astoria Hotel, in New York City. In his speech, Hutchins said, "This is more than a set of books, and more than a liberal education. Great Books of the Western World is an act of piety. Here are the sources of our being. Here is our heritage. This is the West. This is its meaning for mankind." The first two sets of books were given to Elizabeth II, Queen of the United Kingdom, and to Harry S. Truman, the incumbent U.S. president. Adler appeared on the cover of Time for a story about the set of works and its idea index and inventory of Western topics of thought at large, of sorts.

The initial sales of the book sets were poor, with only 1,863 sets sold in 1952, and less than one-tenth of that number of book sets were sold in 1953. A financial debacle loomed until Encyclopædia Britannica altered the sales strategy, and sold the book set through experienced door-to-door encyclopædia-salesmen, as Hutchins had feared; but, through that method, 50,000 sets were sold in 1961. In 1963 the editors published Gateway to the Great Books, a ten-volume set of readings meant to introduce the authors and the subjects of the Great Books. Each year, from 1961 to 1998, the editors published The Great Ideas Today, an annual updating about the applicability of the Great Books to contemporary life. According to Alex Beam, Great Books of the Western World eventually sold a million sets. The Internet and the E-book reader have made available some of the Great Books of the Western World in an on-line format.

== Volumes ==
Originally published in 54 volumes, The Great Books of the Western World covers categories including fiction, history, poetry, natural science, mathematics, philosophy, drama, politics, religion, economics, and ethics. Hutchins wrote the first volume, titled The Great Conversation, as an introduction and discourse on liberal education. Adler sponsored the next two volumes, "The Great Ideas: A Syntopicon", as a way of emphasizing the unity of the set and, by extension, of Western thought in general. A team of indexers spent months compiling references to such topics as "Man's freedom in relation to the will of God" and "The denial of void or vacuum in favor of a plenum". They grouped the topics into 102 chapters, for which Adler wrote the 102 introductions. Four colors identify each volume by subject area—Imaginative Literature, Mathematics and the Natural Sciences, History and Social Science, and Philosophy and Theology.

The following list of Volumes 1–54 is for the first edition (1952). The second edition (1990) omitted "The Great Conversation" by the first editor-in-chief, Robert Maynard Hutchins. Because of this, a number of the volumes of the second edition are numbered one less than they are in the first (e.g., Homer is Volume 4 of the first edition but Volume 3 in the second, and so on). This is of interest because Volumes 3 - 54 are numbered in historical order of the first included author's lifetime, which may lead to some confusion for novice readers when, for example, a 17th-century writer (Kepler) is included in the same volume as Ptolemy (2d century AD).

With one exception, Volumes 3–54 are labelled with all of the included authors listed on the spine. Volumes 40 and 55–60 (second edition) are labelled by subject matter (e.g. volume 57 is called "20th Century Social Sciences I"). The inside covers of volumes 3–60 display useful parallel timelines of all the authors lifespans entitled "Chronology of the Great Authors. The timeline is divided into three eras: Ancient Greece and Rome; The Middle Ages Through the Eighteenth Century; The Nineteenth and Twentieth Centuries.

=== Volume 1 ===
- The Great Conversation

=== Volume 2 ===
- Syntopicon I: Angel, Animal, Aristocracy, Art, Astronomy, Beauty, Being, Cause, Chance, Change, Citizen, Constitution, Courage, Custom and Convention, Definition, Democracy, Desire, Dialectic, Duty, Education, Element, Emotion, Eternity, Evolution, Experience, Family, Fate, Form, God, Good and Evil, Government, Habit, Happiness, History, Honor, Hypothesis, Idea, Immortality, Induction, Infinity, Judgment, Justice, Knowledge, Labor, Language, Law, Liberty, Life and Death, Logic, and Love

=== Volume 3 ===
- Syntopicon II: Man, Mathematics, Matter, Mechanics, Medicine, Memory and Imagination, Metaphysics, Mind, Monarchy, Nature, Necessity and Contingency, Oligarchy, One and Many, Opinion, Opposition, Philosophy, Physics, Pleasure and Pain, Poetry, Principle, Progress, Prophecy, Prudence, Punishment, Quality, Quantity, Reasoning, Relation, Religion, Revolution, Rhetoric, Same and Other, Science, Sense, Sign and Symbol, Sin, Slavery, Soul, Space, State, Temperance, Theology, Time, Truth, Tyranny, Universal and Particular, Virtue and Vice, War and Peace, Wealth, Will, Wisdom, and World

=== Volume 4 ===
- Homer (rendered into English prose by Samuel Butler)
  - The Iliad
  - The Odyssey

=== Volume 5 ===
- Aeschylus (translated into English verse by G.M. Cookson)
  - The Suppliant Maidens
  - The Persians
  - Seven Against Thebes
  - Prometheus Bound
  - The Oresteia
    - Agamemnon
    - Choephoroe
    - The Eumenides
- Sophocles (translated into English prose by Sir Richard C. Jebb)
  - The Oedipus Cycle
    - Oedipus the King
    - Oedipus at Colonus
    - Antigone
  - Ajax
  - Electra
  - The Trachiniae
  - Philoctetes
- Euripides (translated into English prose by Edward P. Coleridge)
  - Rhesus
  - Medea
  - Hippolytus
  - Alcestis
  - Heracleidae
  - The Suppliants
  - The Trojan Women
  - Ion
  - Helen
  - Andromache
  - Electra
  - Bacchantes
  - Hecuba
  - Heracles Mad
  - The Phoenician Women
  - Orestes
  - Iphigenia in Tauris
  - Iphigenia in Aulis
  - Cyclops
- Aristophanes (translated into English verse by Benjamin Bickley Rogers)
  - The Acharnians
  - The Knights
  - The Clouds
  - The Wasps
  - Peace
  - The Birds
  - The Frogs
  - Lysistrata
  - Thesmophoriazusae
  - Ecclesiazousae
  - Plutus

=== Volume 6 ===
- Herodotus
  - The History (translated by George Rawlinson)
- Thucydides
  - History of the Peloponnesian War (translated by Richard Crawley and revised by R. Feetham)

=== Volume 7 ===
- Plato
  - The Dialogues (translated by Benjamin Jowett)
    - Charmides
    - Lysis
    - Laches
    - Protagoras
    - Euthydemus
    - Cratylus
    - Phaedrus
    - Ion
    - Symposium
    - Meno
    - Euthyphro
    - Apology
    - Crito
    - Phaedo
    - Gorgias
    - The Republic
    - Timaeus
    - Critias
    - Parmenides
    - Theaetetus
    - Sophist
    - Statesman
    - Philebus
    - Laws
  - The Seventh Letter (translated by J. Harward)

=== Volume 8 ===
- Aristotle
  - Categories (translated by E. M. Edghill)
  - On Interpretation (translated by E. M. Edghill)
  - Prior Analytics (translated by A. J. Jenkinson)
  - Posterior Analytics (translated by G. R. G. Mure)
  - Topics (translated by A. W. Pickard-Cambridge)
  - Sophistical Refutations (translated by A. W. Pickard-Cambridge)
  - Physics (translated by R. P. Hardie & R. K. Gaye)
  - On the Heavens (translated by J. L. Stocks)
  - On Generation and Corruption (translated by H. H. Joachim)
  - Meteorology (translated by E. W. Webster)
  - Metaphysics (translated by W. D. Ross)
  - On the Soul (translated by J. A. Smith)
  - Minor biological works
    - On Sense and the Sensible (translated by J. I. Beare)
    - On Memory and Reminisence (translated by J. I. Beare)
    - On Sleep and Sleeplessness (translated by J. I. Beare)
    - On Dreams (translated by J. I. Beare)
    - On Prophesying by Dreams (translated by J. I. Beare)
    - On Longevity and Shortness of Life (translated by G. R. T. Ross)
    - On Youth and Old Age, On Life and Death, On Breathing (translated by G. R. T. Ross)

=== Volume 9 ===
- Aristotle
  - History of Animals (translated by D'Arcy Wentworth Thompson)
  - Parts of Animals (translated by William Ogle)
  - On the Motion of Animals (translated by A. S. L. Farquharson)
  - On the Gait of Animals (translated by A. S. L. Farquharson)
  - On the Generation of Animals (translated by Arthur Platt)
  - Nicomachean Ethics (translated by W. D. Ross)
  - Politics (translated by Benjamin Jowett)
  - The Athenian Constitution (translated by Sir Frederic G. Kenyon)
  - Rhetoric (translated by W. Rhys Roberts)
  - Poetics (translated by Ingram Bywater)

=== Volume 10 ===
- Hippocrates
  - Works (translated by Francis Adams)
    - The Hippocratic Oath
    - On Ancient Medicine
    - On Airs, Water, and Places
    - The Book of Prognostics
    - On Regimen in Acute Diseases
    - Of the Epidemics
    - On Injuries of the Head
    - On the Surgery
    - On Fractures
    - On the Articulations
    - Instruments of Reduction
    - Aphorisms
    - The Law
    - The Ulcer
    - On Fistulae
    - On Hemorrhoids
    - On the Sacred Disease
- Galen
  - On the Natural Faculties (translated by Arthur John Brock)

=== Volume 11 ===
- Euclid
  - The Thirteen Books of Euclid's Elements (translated by Thomas Heath)
- Archimedes
  - Works (translated by Thomas Heath)
    - On the Sphere and Cylinder
    - Measurement of a Circle
    - On Conoids and Spheroids
    - On Spirals
    - On the Equilibrium of Planes
    - The Sand Reckoner
    - The Quadrature of the Parabola
    - On Floating Bodies
    - Book of Lemmas
    - The Method Treating of Mechanical Problems
- Apollonius of Perga
  - On Conic Sections (translated by R. Catesby Taliaferro)
- Nicomachus of Gerasa
  - Introduction to Arithmetic (translated by Martin L D'Ooge)

=== Volume 12 ===
- Lucretius
  - On the Nature of Things (translated by H.A.J. Munro)
- Epictetus
  - The Discourses (translated by George Long)
- Marcus Aurelius
  - The Meditations (translated by George Long)

=== Volume 13 ===
- Virgil (translated into English verse by James Rhoades)
  - Eclogues
  - Georgics
  - Aeneid

=== Volume 14 ===
- Plutarch
  - The Lives of the Noble Grecians and Romans (translated by John Dryden)

=== Volume 15 ===
- P. Cornelius Tacitus (translated by Alfred John Church and William Jackson Brodribb)
  - The Annals
  - The Histories

=== Volume 16 ===
- Ptolemy
  - Almagest, (translated by R. Catesby Taliaferro)
- Nicolaus Copernicus
  - On the Revolutions of Heavenly Spheres (translated by Charles Glenn Wallis)
- Johannes Kepler (translated by Charles Glenn Wallis)
  - Epitome of Copernican Astronomy (Books IV–V)
  - The Harmonies of the World (Book V)

=== Volume 17 ===
- Plotinus
  - The Six Enneads (translated by Stephen MacKenna and B. S. Page)

=== Volume 18 ===
- Augustine of Hippo
  - The Confessions (translated by Edward Bouverie Pusey)
  - The City of God (translated by Marcus Dods)
  - On Christian Doctrine (translated by J.F. Shaw)

=== Volume 19 ===
- Thomas Aquinas
  - Summa Theologica (First part complete, selections from second part, translated by the Fathers of the English Dominican Province and revised by Daniel J. Sullivan)

=== Volume 20 ===
- Thomas Aquinas
  - Summa Theologica (Selections from second and third parts and supplement, translated by the Fathers of the English Dominican Province and revised by Daniel J. Sullivan)

=== Volume 21 ===
- Dante Alighieri
  - Divine Comedy (Translated by Charles Eliot Norton)

=== Volume 22 ===
- Geoffrey Chaucer
  - Troilus and Criseyde (Middle English edited by W. W. Skeat and sequenced by Thomas Tyrwhitt; translated by George Philip Krapp)
  - The Canterbury Tales (Middle English edited by W. W. Skeat and sequenced by Thomas Tyrwhitt; translated by J. U. Nicolson)

=== Volume 23 ===
- Niccolò Machiavelli
  - The Prince (translated by W. K. Marriott)
- Thomas Hobbes
  - Leviathan (edited by Nelle Fuller)

=== Volume 24 ===
- François Rabelais
  - Gargantua and Pantagruel (Books I-IV, translated by Thomas Urquhart and Peter Anthony Motteux)

=== Volume 25 ===
- Michel Eyquem de Montaigne
  - Essays (translated by Charles Cotton, edited by W. Carew Hazlitt)

=== Volume 26 ===
- William Shakespeare
  - The First Part of King Henry the Sixth
  - The Second Part of King Henry the Sixth
  - The Third Part of King Henry the Sixth
  - The Tragedy of Richard the Third
  - The Comedy of Errors
  - Titus Andronicus
  - The Taming of the Shrew
  - The Two Gentlemen of Verona
  - Love's Labour's Lost
  - Romeo and Juliet
  - The Tragedy of King Richard the Second
  - A Midsummer Night's Dream
  - The Life and Death of King John
  - The Merchant of Venice
  - The First Part of King Henry the Fourth
  - The Second Part of King Henry the Fourth
  - Much Ado About Nothing
  - The Life of King Henry the Fifth
  - Julius Caesar
  - As You Like It

=== Volume 27 ===
- William Shakespeare
  - Twelfth Night; or, What You Will
  - The Tragedy of Hamlet, Prince of Denmark
  - The Merry Wives of Windsor
  - Troilus and Cressida
  - All's Well That Ends Well
  - Measure for Measure
  - Othello, the Moor of Venice
  - King Lear
  - Macbeth
  - Antony and Cleopatra
  - Coriolanus
  - Timon of Athens
  - Pericles, Prince of Tyre
  - Cymbeline
  - The Winter's Tale
  - The Tempest
  - The Famous History of the Life of King Henry the Eighth
  - Sonnets

=== Volume 28 ===
- William Gilbert
  - On the Loadstone and Magnetic Bodies (translated by P. Fleury Mottelay)
- Galileo Galilei
  - Dialogues Concerning the Two New Sciences (translated by Henry Crew and Alfonso de Salvio)
- William Harvey
  - On the Motion of the Heart and Blood in Animals (translated by Robert Willis)
  - On the Circulation of Blood (translated by Robert Willis)
  - On the Generation of Animals (translated by Robert Willis)

=== Volume 29 ===
- Miguel de Cervantes
  - The History of Don Quixote de la Mancha (translated by John Ormsby)

=== Volume 30 ===
- Sir Francis Bacon
  - The Advancement of Learning
  - Novum Organum
  - New Atlantis

=== Volume 31 ===
- René Descartes
  - Rules for the Direction of the Mind (translated by Elizabeth S. Haldane and G. R. T. Ross)
  - Discourse on the Method (translated by Elizabeth S. Haldane and G. R. T. Ross)
  - Meditations on First Philosophy (translated by Elizabeth S. Haldane and G. R. T. Ross)
  - Objections Against the Meditations and Replies (translated by Elizabeth S. Haldane and G. R. T. Ross)
  - The Geometry (translated by David Eugene Smith and Marcia L. Latham)
- Benedict de Spinoza
  - Ethics (translated by W. H. White, revised by A. H. Stirling)

=== Volume 32 ===
- John Milton
  - English Minor Poems
    - On the Morning of Christ's Nativity
    - A Paraphrase on Psalm 114
    - Psalm 136
    - The Passion
    - On Time
    - Upon the Circumcision
    - At a Solemn Musick
    - An Epitaph on the Marchioness of Winchester
    - Song on May Morning
    - On Shakespeare
    - On the University Carrier
    - Another on the same
    - L'Allegro
    - Il Penseroso
    - Arcades
    - Lycidas
    - Comus
    - On the Death of a Fair Infant
    - At a Vacation Exercise
    - The Fifth Ode of Horace
    - Sonnets (I, and VII—XIX)
    - On the New Forcers of Conscience
    - On the Lord General Fairfax at the Siege of Colchester
    - To the Lord General Cromwell
    - To Sir Henry Vane the Younger
    - To Mister Cyriack the Skinner upon his Blindness
    - Psalms (I—VIII & LXXX—LXXXVIII)
  - Paradise Lost
  - Samson Agonistes
  - Areopagitica

=== Volume 33 ===
- Blaise Pascal
  - The Provincial Letters (translated by Thomas M'Crie)
  - Pensées (translated by W. F. Trotter)
  - Scientific and mathematical essays (translated by Richard Scofield)
    - Preface to the Treatise on the Vacuum
    - New Experiments Concerning the Vacuum
    - Account of the Great Experiment Concerning the Equilibrium of Fluids
    - Treatises on the Equilibrium of Liquids and on the Weight of the Mass of the Air
    - On Geometrical Demonstration
    - Treatise on the Arithmetical Triangle
    - Correspondence with Fermat on the Theory of Probabilities

=== Volume 34 ===
- Sir Isaac Newton
  - Mathematical Principles of Natural Philosophy (translated by Andrew Motte, revised by Florian Cajori)
  - Optics
- Christiaan Huygens
  - Treatise on Light (translated by Silvanus P. Thompson)

=== Volume 35 ===
- John Locke
  - A Letter Concerning Toleration
  - Concerning Civil Government, Second Essay
  - An Essay Concerning Human Understanding
- George Berkeley
  - The Principles of Human Knowledge
- David Hume
  - An Enquiry Concerning Human Understanding

=== Volume 36 ===
- Jonathan Swift
  - Gulliver's Travels
- Laurence Sterne
  - The Life and Opinions of Tristram Shandy, Gentleman

=== Volume 37 ===
- Henry Fielding
  - The History of Tom Jones, a Foundling

=== Volume 38 ===
- Charles de Secondat, Baron de Montesquieu
  - The Spirit of the Laws (translated by Thomas Nugent, revised by J. V. Prichard
- Jean Jacques Rousseau
  - A Discourse on the Origin of Inequality (translated by G. D. H. Cole)
  - A Discourse on Political Economy (translated by G. D. H. Cole)
  - The Social Contract (translated by G. D. H. Cole)

=== Volume 39 ===
- Adam Smith
  - An Inquiry into the Nature and Causes of the Wealth of Nations

=== Volume 40 ===
- Edward Gibbon
  - The Decline and Fall of the Roman Empire (Part 1)

=== Volume 41 ===
- Edward Gibbon
  - The Decline and Fall of the Roman Empire (Part 2)

=== Volume 42 ===
- Immanuel Kant
  - Critique of Pure Reason (translated by J. M. D. Meiklejohn)
  - Fundamental Principles of the Metaphysic of Morals (translated by Thomas Kingsmill Abbott)
  - Critique of Practical Reason (translated by Thomas Kingsmill Abbott)
  - Excerpts from The Metaphysics of Morals
    - Preface and Introduction to the Metaphysical Elements of Ethics with a note on Conscience (translated by Thomas Kingsmill Abbott)
    - General Introduction to the Metaphysic of Morals (translated by W. Hastie)
    - The Science of Right (translated by W. Hastie)
  - The Critique of Judgement (translated by James Creed Meredith)

=== Volume 43 ===
- American State Papers
  - Declaration of Independence
  - Articles of Confederation
  - The Constitution of the United States of America
- Alexander Hamilton, James Madison, John Jay
  - The Federalist
- John Stuart Mill
  - On Liberty
  - Considerations on Representative Government
  - Utilitarianism

=== Volume 44 ===
- James Boswell
  - The Life of Samuel Johnson, LL.D.

=== Volume 45 ===
- Antoine Laurent Lavoisier
  - Elements of Chemistry (translated by Robert Kerr)
- Jean Baptiste Joseph Fourier
  - Analytical Theory of Heat (translated by Alexander Freeman)
- Michael Faraday
  - Experimental Researches in Electricity

=== Volume 46 ===
- Georg Wilhelm Friedrich Hegel
  - The Philosophy of Right (translated by T. M. Knox)
  - The Philosophy of History (translated by J. Sibree)

=== Volume 47 ===
- Johann Wolfgang von Goethe
  - Faust (translated by George Madison Priest)

=== Volume 48 ===
- Herman Melville
  - Moby Dick; or, The Whale

=== Volume 49 ===
- Charles Darwin
  - The Origin of Species by Means of Natural Selection
  - The Descent of Man, and Selection in Relation to Sex

=== Volume 50 ===
- Karl Marx
  - Capital (edited by Friedrich Engels, translated by Samuel Moore and Edward Aveling, revised by Marie Sachey and Herbert Lamm)
- Karl Marx and Friedrich Engels
  - Manifesto of the Communist Party (edited by Friedrich Engels, translated by Samuel Moore)

=== Volume 51 ===
- Count Leo Tolstoy
  - War and Peace (translated by Aylmer and Louise Maude)

=== Volume 52 ===
- Fyodor Mikhailovich Dostoevsky
  - The Brothers Karamazov (translated by Constance Garnett)

=== Volume 53 ===
- William James
  - The Principles of Psychology

=== Volume 54 ===
- Sigmund Freud
  - The Origin and Development of Psycho-Analysis (translated by Harry W. Chase)
  - Selected Papers on Hysteria (translated by A. A. Brill)
  - The Sexual Enlightenment of Children (translated by E. B. M. Herford)
  - The Future Prospects of Psycho-Analytic Therapy (translated by Joan Riviere)
  - Observations on "Wild" Psycho-Analysis (translated by Joan Riviere)
  - The Interpretation of Dreams (translated by A. A. Brill)
  - On Narcissism (translated by Cecil M. Baines)
  - Instincts and Their Vicissitudes (translated by Cecil M. Baines)
  - Repression (translated by Cecil M. Baines)
  - The Unconscious (translated by Cecil M. Baines)
  - A General Introduction to Psycho-Analysis (translated by Joan Riviere)
  - Beyond the Pleasure Principle (translated by C. J. M. Hubback)
  - Group Psychology and the Analysis of the Ego (translated by James Strachey)
  - The Ego and the Id (translated by Joan Riviere)
  - Inhibitions, Symptoms, and Anxiety (translated by Alix Strachey)
  - Thoughts for the Times on War and Death (translated by E. Colburn Mayne)
  - Civilization and Its Discontents (translated by Joan Riviere)
  - New Introductory Lectures on Psycho-Analysis (translated by W. J. H. Sprott)

== Second edition ==
The second edition of Great Books of the Western World, 1990, saw an increase from 54 to 60 volumes, with updated translations. The six new volumes concerned the 20th century, an era of which the first edition's sole representative was Freud. Some of the other volumes were re-arranged, with even more pre-20th century material added but with four texts deleted: Apollonius' On Conic Sections, Laurence Sterne's Tristram Shandy, Henry Fielding's Tom Jones, and Joseph Fourier's Analytical Theory of Heat. Adler later expressed regret about dropping On Conic Sections and Tom Jones. Adler also voiced disagreement with the addition of Voltaire's Candide, and said that the Syntopicon should have included references to the Koran. He addressed criticisms that the set was too heavily Western European and did not adequately represent women and minority authors. Four women authors were included, where previously there were none.

The added pre-20th century texts appear in these volumes (some of the accompanying content of these volumes differs from the first edition volume of that number):

=== Volume 3 ===
- Homer
  - The Iliad (translated by Richmond Lattimore)
  - The Odyssey (translated by Richmond Lattimore)

=== Volume 4 ===
- Aeschylus
  - The Suppliant Maidens (translated by Seth G. Benardete)
  - The Persians (translated by Seth G. Benardete)
  - Seven Against Thebes (translated by David Grene)
  - Prometheus Bound (translated by David Grene)
  - Agamemnon (translated by Richmond Lattimore)
  - Choephoroe (translated by Richmond Lattimore)
  - The Eumenides (translated by Richmond Lattimore)
- Sophocles
  - Oedipus the King (translated by David Grene)
  - Oedipus at Colonus (translated by Robert Fitzgerald)
  - Antigone (translated by Elizabeth Wyckoff)
  - Ajax (translated by John Moore)
  - Electra (translated by David Grene)
  - Women of Trachis (translated by Michael Jameson)
  - Philoctetes (translated by David Grene)
- Euripides
  - Rhesus (translated by Richmond Lattimore)
  - Medea (translated by Rex Warner)
  - Hippolytus (translated by David Grene)
  - Alcestis (translated by Richmond Lattimore)
  - Heracleidae (translated by Ralph Gladstone)
  - The Suppliant Women (translated by Frank William Jones)
  - The Trojan Women (translated by Richmond Lattimore)
  - Ion (translated by Ronald Frederick Willetts)
  - Helen (translated by Richmond Lattimore)
  - Andromache (translated by John Frederick Nims)
  - Electra (translated by Emily Townsend Vermeule)
  - The Bacchae (translated by William Arrowsmith)
  - Hecuba (translated by William Arrowsmith)
  - Heracles (translated by William Arrowsmith)
  - The Phoenician Women (translated by Elizabeth Wyckoff)
  - Orestes (translated by William Arrowsmith)
  - Iphigenia in Tauris (translated by Witter Bynner)
  - Iphigenia in Aulis (translated by Charles R. Walker)
  - The Cyclops (translated by William Arrowsmith)
- Aristophanes
  - The Acharnians (translated by Alan H. Sommerstein)
  - The Knights (translated by Alan H. Sommerstein)
  - The Clouds (translated by Alan H. Sommerstein)
  - The Wasps (translated by David Barrett)
  - Peace (translated by Alan H. Sommerstein)
  - The Birds (translated by David Barrett)
  - The Frogs (translated by David Barrett)
  - Lysistrata (translated by Alan H. Sommerstein)
  - The Poet and the Women (translated by David Barrett)
  - The Assemblywomen (translated by David Barrett)
  - Plutus (translated by Alan H. Sommerstein)

=== Volume 11 ===
- Lucretius
  - The Way Things Are (translated by Rolfe Humphries)
- Epictetus
  - The Discourses (translated by George Long)
- Marcus Aurelius
  - The Meditations (translated by George Long)
- Plotinus
  - The Six Enneads (translated by Stephen MacKenna and B. S. Page)

=== Volume 12 ===
- Virgil (translated by C. Day-Lewis)
  - Eclogues
  - Georgics
  - Aeneid

=== Volume 16 ===
- Augustine of Hippo
  - The Confessions (translated by R. S. Pine-Coffin)
  - The City of God (translated by Marcus Dods)
  - On Christian Doctrine (translated by J. F. Shaw)

=== Volume 19 ===
- Dante Alighieri
  - The Divine Comedy (translated by Charles S. Singleton)
- Geoffrey Chaucer
  - Troilus and Criseyde (translated by Neville Coghill)
  - The Canterbury Tales (translated by Neville Coghill)

=== Volume 20 ===
- John Calvin
  - Institutes of the Christian Religion (First and Second Books complete, Third Book chapters I-V, Fourth Book chapters I-XIII, translated by Henry Beveridge)

=== Volume 23 ===
- Erasmus
  - The Praise of Folly (translated by Betty Radice)
- Montaigne
  - Essays (translated by Donald M. Frame)

=== Volume 27 ===
- Miguel de Cervantes
  - The History of Don Quixote de la Mancha (translated by Samuel Putnam)

=== Volume 31 ===
- Molière
  - The School for Wives (translated by Morris Bishop)
  - The Critique of the School for Wives (translated by Morris Bishop)
  - Tartuffe (translated by Morris Bishop)
  - Don Juan (translated by John Wood)
  - The Miser (translated by Wallace Fowlie)
  - The Would-Be Gentleman (translated by Morris Bishop)
  - The Imaginary Invalid (translated by Morris Bishop)
- Jean Racine
  - Bérénice (translated by Samuel Solomon)
  - Phèdre (translated by Samuel Solomon)

=== Volume 34 ===
- Voltaire
  - Candide (translated by Peter Gay)
- Denis Diderot
  - Rameau's Nephew (translated by Jacques Barzun)

=== Volume 43 ===
- Søren Kierkegaard
  - Fear and Trembling (translated by Walter Lowrie)
- Friedrich Nietzsche
  - Beyond Good and Evil (translated by R. J. Hollingdale)

=== Volume 44 ===
- Alexis de Tocqueville
  - Democracy in America (translated by George Lawrence)

=== Volume 45 ===
- Johann Wolfgang von Goethe
  - Faust (translated by Philip Wayne)
- Honoré de Balzac
  - Cousin Bette (translated by Marion Ayton Crawford)

=== Volume 46 ===
- Jane Austen
  - Emma
- George Eliot
  - Middlemarch

=== Volume 47 ===
- Charles Dickens
  - Little Dorrit

=== Volume 48 ===
- Mark Twain
  - Huckleberry Finn

=== Volume 52 ===
- Henrik Ibsen
  - A Doll's House (translated by James W. McFarlane)
  - The Wild Duck (translated by James W. McFarlane)
  - Hedda Gabler (translated by Jens Arup)
  - The Master Builder (translated by James W. McFarlane)

The contents of the six volumes of added 20th-century material:

=== Volume 55 ===
- William James
  - Pragmatism
- Henri Bergson
  - "An Introduction to Metaphysics" (translated by T. E. Hulme)
- John Dewey
  - Experience and Education
- Alfred North Whitehead
  - Science and the Modern World
- Bertrand Russell
  - The Problems of Philosophy
- Martin Heidegger
  - What Is Metaphysics? (translated by R. F. C. Hull and Alan Crick)
- Ludwig Wittgenstein
  - Philosophical Investigations (translated by G. E. M. Anscombe)
- Karl Barth
  - The Word of God and the Word of Man (translated by Douglas Horton)

=== Volume 56 ===
- Henri Poincaré
  - Science and Hypothesis (translated by William John Greenstreet)
- Max Planck
  - Scientific Autobiography and Other Papers (translated by Frank Gaynor)
- Alfred North Whitehead
  - An Introduction to Mathematics
- Albert Einstein
  - Relativity: The Special and the General Theory (translated by Robert W. Lawson)
- Arthur Eddington
  - The Expanding Universe
- Niels Bohr
  - Atomic Theory and the Description of Nature (selections)
  - Discussion with Einstein on Epistemology
- G. H. Hardy
  - A Mathematician's Apology
- Werner Heisenberg
  - Physics and Philosophy
- Erwin Schrödinger
  - What Is Life?
- Theodosius Dobzhansky
  - Genetics and the Origin of Species
- C. H. Waddington
  - The Nature of Life

=== Volume 57 ===
- Thorstein Veblen
  - The Theory of the Leisure Class
- R. H. Tawney
  - The Acquisitive Society
- John Maynard Keynes
  - The General Theory of Employment, Interest and Money

=== Volume 58 ===
- Sir James George Frazer
  - The Golden Bough (Chapters I-IV, LXVI-LXVII, LXIX)
- Max Weber
  - Essays in Sociology (Chapters IV-XIII, translated by H. H. Gerth and C. Wright Mills)
- Johan Huizinga
  - The Autumn of the Middle Ages (translated by Frederik Jan Hopman)
- Claude Lévi-Strauss
  - Structural Anthropology (Chapters I-VI, IX-XII, XV, XVII, translated by Claire Jacobson and Brooke Grundfest Schoepf)

=== Volume 59 ===
- Henry James
  - The Beast in the Jungle
- George Bernard Shaw
  - Saint Joan
- Joseph Conrad
  - Heart of Darkness
- Anton Chekhov
  - Uncle Vanya (translated by Elisaveta Fen)
- Luigi Pirandello
  - Six Characters in Search of an Author (translated by Edward Storer)
- Marcel Proust
  - Remembrance of Things Past: "Swann in Love" (translated by C. K. Scott Moncrieff and Terence Kilmartin)
- Willa Cather
  - A Lost Lady
- Thomas Mann
  - Death in Venice (translated by H. T. Lowe-Porter)
- James Joyce
  - A Portrait of the Artist as a Young Man

=== Volume 60 ===
- Virginia Woolf
  - To the Lighthouse
- Franz Kafka
  - The Metamorphosis (translated by Willa and Edwin Muir)
- D. H. Lawrence
  - The Prussian Officer
- T. S. Eliot
  - The Waste Land
- Eugene O'Neill
  - Mourning Becomes Electra
- F. Scott Fitzgerald
  - The Great Gatsby
- William Faulkner
  - A Rose for Emily
- Bertolt Brecht
  - Mother Courage and Her Children (translated by Ralph Manheim)
- Ernest Hemingway
  - The Short Happy Life of Francis Macomber
- George Orwell
  - Animal Farm
- Samuel Beckett
  - Waiting for Godot

== Exclusion of the Bible ==
It is commonly accepted that the Bible is a part of the canon of the Great Books, although Britannica does not include it in any edition. As remarked in the preface to the Synopticon:

Readers who are startled to find the Bible omitted from the set will be reassured to learn that this was done only because Bibles are already widely distributed, and it was felt unnecessary to bring another, by way of this set, into homes that had several already.

A lot of reading plans for the Great Books include parts of the Bible. Britannica themselves included the Bible in their 10-year Reading Plan. St. John's College, a liberal arts school known for Great Books–based curriculum, assigns the Old and New Testaments to students in their sophomore year.

== Criticisms and responses ==
=== Authors ===
The selection of authors has come under attack, with some dismissing the project as a celebration of European men, ignoring contributions of women and non-European authors. The criticism swelled in tandem with the feminist and civil rights movements. Similarly, in his Europe: A History (1996), Norman Davies criticizes the compilation for overrepresenting selected parts of the Western world, especially Britain and the U.S., while ignoring the other, particularly Central and Eastern Europe. According to his calculation, in 151 authors included in both editions, there are 49 English or American authors, 27 Frenchmen, 20 Germans, 15 ancient Greeks, 9 ancient Romans, 4 Russians, 4 Scandinavians, 3 Spaniards, 3 Italians, 3 Irishmen, 3 Scots, and 3 Eastern Europeans. He concludes that prejudices and preferences are self-evident. In response, such criticisms have been derided as ad hominem and biased in themselves. The counter-argument maintains that such criticisms discount the importance of books solely because of generic, imprecise, and possibly irrelevant characteristics of the books' authors rather than because of the content of the books themselves.

=== Works ===
Others thought that while the selected authors were worthy, too much emphasis was placed on the complete works of a single author rather than a wider selection of authors and representative works. For example, two volumes each are reserved for the complete or near-complete collections of Aristotle, Thomas Aquinas, William Shakespeare, and Edward Gibbon. The second edition of the set already contained 130 authors and 517 individual works. The editors point out that the guides to additional reading for each topic in the Syntopicon refer the interested reader to many more authors.

=== Difficulty ===
The scientific and mathematical selections came under criticism for being incomprehensible to the average reader, especially with the absence of any sort of critical apparatus. The second edition did drop two scientific works, by Apollonius and Fourier, in part because of their perceived difficulty for the average reader. Nevertheless, the editors steadfastly maintain that average readers are capable of understanding far more than the critics deem possible. Robert Hutchins stated this view in the introduction to the first edition:

Because the great bulk of mankind have never had the chance to get a liberal education, it cannot be "proved" that they can get it. Neither can it be "proved" that they cannot. The statement of the ideal, however, is of value in indicating the direction that education should take.

=== Rationale ===
Since the great majority of the works were still in print, one critic remarked that the company could have saved two million dollars and simply written a list. Dense formatting also did not help readability. Nonetheless, Encyclopædia Britannica's aggressive promotion produced solid sales. The second edition selected translations that were generally considered an improvement, though the cramped typography remained. Through reading plans and the Syntopicon, the editors attempted to guide readers through the set.

=== Response to criticisms ===
The editors responded that the set contains wide-ranging debates representing many viewpoints on significant issues, not a monolithic school of thought. Mortimer Adler argued in the introduction to the second edition:

Presenting a wide variety and divergence of views or opinions, among which there is likely to be some truth but also much more error, the Syntopicon [and by extension the larger set itself] invites readers to think for themselves and make up their own minds on every topic under consideration.

== National censorship ==
In apartheid South Africa, volumes containing the works of Karl Marx were officially censored by the government. The volume containing the work of Marx only retained the extract from Das Kapital Volume 1 with a note on the cover page informing the reader of the exclusion of The Communist Manifesto as per the nation’s 1950 Suppression of Communism Act.

== See also ==
- Educational perennialism
- Gateway to the Great Books
- Other series of classics:
  - Ancient Classics for English Readers
  - Great Illustrated Classics
  - Harvard Classics
  - Loeb Classical Library
  - Modern Library
  - Oxford World's Classics
  - Penguin classics (several articles)
  - Sacred Books of the East
