= Gateway to the Great Books =

1963 Encyclopædia Britannica collection

- Cover of Volume One
- Editors: Mortimer Adler and Robert Maynard Hutchins
- Language: English
- Publisher: Encyclopædia Britannica
- Publication date: First edition, 1963

Gateway to the Great Books is a 10-volume collection of classic fiction and nonfiction literature edited by Mortimer Adler and Robert Maynard Hutchins, with Clifton Fadiman credited as associate editor, that was published by Encyclopædia Britannica in 1963.

The set was designed to be an introduction to the Great Books of the Western World, published by the same organization and editors in 1952. The set included selections of short stories, plays, essays, letters, and extracts from longer works by more than one hundred authors. The selections were generally shorter and in some ways simpler than the full-length books included in Great Books of the Western World.

== Authors ==
A number of authors in the Great Books set – such as Plutarch, Epictetus, Tacitus, Dante, Herman Melville, Fyodor Dostoyevsky, Jean-Jacques Rousseau, David Hume, John Stuart Mill, Francis Bacon, Charles Darwin and William James – were also represented by shorter works in the Gateway volumes. In addition, several Gateway readings discussed authors in the Great Books series. For instance, a selection from Henry Adams' Mont-Saint-Michel and Chartres critiqued the philosophy of St. Thomas Aquinas.

Indeed, many writers in the Gateway set were eventually "promoted" to the second edition (1990) of the Great Books, such as Alexis de Tocqueville, Molière, Henry James, Charles Dickens, Virginia Woolf, Albert Einstein and John Dewey.

== Index, editorial material, criticism ==
The set included an index similar to the Great Books' Syntopicon, along with reading plans of increasing difficulty. Hutchins wrote an introduction with a more informal tone than he used in The Great Conversation, his preface to the Great Books, and that chiefly explained the relevance of most of the categories making up the set: "The Imagination of Man" (about fiction and drama), "Man and Society," "Science and Mathematics," and "Philosophy." The set contained biographical notes on the various authors, similar to those in the Great Books. However, the set also contained editorial introductions to the selections, which were generally not included in the Great Books. In another departure from the Great Books series, the set included black-and-white drawings of most of the authors by Chicago portraitist Fred Steffen, who also wrote brief notes describing the illustrations. Details from a number of these drawings were featured on the volume covers.

Although the editors maintained that many selections were appropriate to readers as young as seventh-grade students, the set included a fair amount of material challenging for the most experienced reader. The Gateway volumes were single-column with large, readable type.

== Contents ==
Volume 1: Introduction; Syntopical Guide

- A letter to the reader
- Introduction
- Syntopical guide
- Appendices
  - A plan of graded reading
  - Recommended novels
  - Recommended anthologies of poetry

Volume 2: Imaginative Literature I

- Daniel Defoe, Excerpts from Robinson Crusoe
- Rudyard Kipling, "Mowgli's Brothers" from The Jungle Book
- Victor Hugo, "The Battle with the Cannon" from Ninety-Three
- Guy de Maupassant, "Two Friends"
- Ernest Hemingway, "The Killers" from Men Without Women
- Sir Walter Scott, "The Two Drovers" from Chronicles of the Canongate
- Joseph Conrad, "Youth"
- Voltaire, Micromégas
- Oscar Wilde, "The Happy Prince" from The Happy Prince and Other Tales
- Edgar Allan Poe, "The Tell-Tale Heart"; "The Masque of the Red Death"
- Robert Louis Stevenson, The Strange Case of Dr. Jekyll and Mr. Hyde
- Mark Twain (Samuel Clemens), The Man That Corrupted Hadleyburg
- Charles Dickens, "A Full and Faithful Report of the Memorable Trial of Bardell against Pickwick" from The Pickwick Papers
- Nikolai Gogol, "The Overcoat"
- Samuel Butler, "Customs and Opinions of the Erewhonians" from Erewhon
- Sherwood Anderson, "I'm a Fool"
- Anonymous, Aucassin and Nicolette

Volume 3: Imaginative Literature II

- Stephen Crane, "The Open Boat"
- Herman Melville, "Billy Budd"
- Ivan Bunin, "The Gentleman from San Francisco"
- Nathaniel Hawthorne, "Rappaccini's Daughter"
- George Eliot, "The Lifted Veil"
- Lucius Apuleius, "Cupid and Psyche" from The Golden Ass
- Ivan Turgenev, "First Love"
- Fyodor Dostoevsky, "White Nights"
- John Galsworthy, "The Apple-Tree"
- Gustave Flaubert, "The Legend of St. Julian the Hospitaller"
- F. Scott Fitzgerald, "The Diamond as Big as the Ritz"
- Honoré de Balzac, "A Passion in the Desert"
- Anton Chekhov, "The Darling"
- Isaac Singer, "The Spinoza of Market Street"
- Alexander Pushkin, "The Queen of Spades"
- D. H. Lawrence, "The Rocking-Horse Winner"
- Henry James, "The Pupil"
- Thomas Mann, "Mario and the Magician"
- Isak Dinesen, "Sorrow-Acre"
- Leo Tolstoy, "The Death of Ivan Ilyich"; "The Three Hermits"; "What Men Live By"

Volume 4: Imaginative Literature III

- Molière, The Misanthrope, The Doctor in Spite of Himself
- Richard Brinsley Sheridan, The School for Scandal
- Henrik Ibsen, An Enemy of the People
- Anton Chekhov, The Cherry Orchard
- George Bernard Shaw, The Man of Destiny
- John Synge, Riders to the Sea
- Eugene O'Neill, The Emperor Jones

Volume 5: Critical Essays

- Virginia Woolf, "How Should One Read a Book?"
- Matthew Arnold, "The Study of Poetry"; "Sweetness and Light"
- Charles Augustin Sainte-Beuve, "What Is a Classic?"; "Montaigne"
- Francis Bacon, "Of Beauty"; "Of Discourse"; "Of Studies"
- David Hume, "Of the Standard of Taste"
- Arthur Schopenhauer, "On Style"; "On Some Forms of Literature"; "On the Comparative Place of Interest and Beauty in Works of Art"
- Friedrich Schiller, "On Simple and Sentimental Poetry"
- Percy Bysshe Shelley, "A Defence of Poetry"
- Walt Whitman, Preface to Leaves of Grass
- William Hazlitt, "My First Acquaintance with Poets", "On Swift", "Of Persons One Would Wish to Have Seen"
- Charles Lamb, "My First Play", "Dream Children, a Reverie", "Sanity of True Genius"
- Samuel Johnson, Preface to Shakespeare
- Thomas de Quincey, "Literature of Knowledge and Literature of Power", "On the Knocking at the Gate in Macbeth"
- T. S. Eliot, "Dante", "Tradition and the Individual Talent"

Volume 6: Man and Society I

- John Stuart Mill, "Childhood and Youth" from Autobiography
- Mark Twain, "Learning the River" from Life on the Mississippi
- Jean de La Bruyère, "Characters" from A Book of Characters
- Thomas Carlyle, 'The Hero as King" from On Heroes, Hero-Worship and the Heroic in History
- Ralph Waldo Emerson, "Thoreau"
- Nathaniel Hawthorne, "Sketch of Abraham Lincoln"
- Walt Whitman, "Death of Abraham Lincoln"
- Virginia Woolf, "The Art of Biography"
- Xenophon, "The March to the Sea" from The Persian Expedition; "The Character of Socrates" from Memorabilia
- William H. Prescott, "The Land of Montezuma" from The Conquest of Mexico
- Haniel Long, "The Power within Us"
- Pliny the Younger, "The Eruption of Vesuvius"
- Tacitus, "The Life of Gnaeus Julius Agricola"
- François Guizot, "Civilization" from History of Civilization in Europe
- Henry Adams, "The United States in 1800" from History of the United States of America
- John Bagnell Bury, "Herodotus" from The Ancient Greek Historians
- Lucian, "The Way to Write History"
- Great Documents
  - The English Bill of Rights
  - Declaration of the Rights of Man and of the Citizen
  - The Virginia Declaration of Rights
  - The Declaration of Independence
  - Charter of the United Nations
  - Universal Declaration of Human Rights
- Thomas Paine, "A Call to Patriots – December 23, 1776"
- George Washington, "Circular Letter to the Governors of All the States on Disbanding the Army"; "The Farewell Address"
- Thomas Jefferson, "The Virginia Constitution" from Notes on the State of Virginia; "First Inaugural Address"; "Biographical Sketches"
- Benjamin Franklin, "A Proposal for Promoting Useful Knowledge among the British Plantations in America", "Proposals Relating to the Education of Youth in Pennsylvania"
- Jean de Crevecoeur, "The Making of Americans" from Letters from an American Farmer
- Alexis de Tocqueville, "Observations on American Life and Government" from Democracy in America
- Henry David Thoreau, "Civil Disobedience"; "A Plea for Captain John Brown"
- Abraham Lincoln, "Address at Cooper Institute"; "First Inaugural Address"; "Letter to Horace Greeley", "Meditation on the Divine Will"; "The Gettysburg Address"; "Second Inaugural Address"; "Last Public Address"

Volume 7: Man and Society II

- Francis Bacon, "Of Youth and Age", "Of Parents and Children", "Of Marriage and Single Life", "Of Great Place", "Of Seditions and Troubles", "Of Custom and Education", "Of Followers and Friends", "Of Usury", "Of Riches"
- Jonathan Swift, "Resolutions when I Come to Be Old", "An Essay on Modern Education", "A Meditation upon a Broomstick", "A Modest Proposal for Preventing the Children of Ireland from Being a Burden to Their Parents or Country"
- David Hume, "Of Refinement in the Arts"; "Of Money"; "Of the Balance of Trade"; "Of Taxes"; "Of the Study of History"
- Plutarch, "Of Bashfulness"
- Robert Louis Stevenson, "The Lantern-Bearers" from Across the Plains
- John Ruskin, "An Idealist's Arraignment of the Age" from Four Clavigera
- William James, "On a Certain Blindness in Human Beings", "The Energies of Men", "Great Men and Their Environment"
- Arthur Schopenhauer, "On Education"
- Michael Faraday, "Observations on Mental Education"
- Edmund Burke, "Letter to the Sheriffs of Bristol"
- John Calhoun, "The Concurrent Majority"
- Thomas Babington Macaulay, "Machiavelli"
- Voltaire, "English Men and Ideas" from Letters on the English
- Dante, "On World Government" from De Monarchia
- Jean-Jacques Rousseau, "A Lasting Peace through the Federation of Europe"
- Immanuel Kant, "Perpetual Peace"
- Carl von Clausewitz, "What Is War?" from On War
- Thomas Robert Malthus, "The Principle of Population" from Population: The First Essay

Volume 8: Natural Science

- Francis Bacon, "The Sphinx"
- John Tyndall, "Michael Faraday" from Faraday as a Discoverer
- Ève Curie, "The Discovery of Radium" from Madame Curie
- Charles Darwin, "Autobiography"
- Jean-Henri Fabre, "A Laboratory of the Open Fields"; "The Sacred Beetle"
- Loren Eiseley, "On Time"
- Rachel Carson, "The Sunless Sea" from The Sea Around Us
- J. B. S. Haldane, "On Being the Right Size" from Possible Worlds
- Thomas Henry Huxley, "On the Relations of Man to the Lower Animals", "On a Piece of Chalk"
- Francis Galton, "The Classification of Human Ability" from Hereditary Genius
- Claude Bernard, "Experimental Considerations Common to Living Things and Inorganic Bodies"
- Ivan Pavlov, "Scientific Study of the So-called Psychical Processes in the Higher Animals"
- Friedrich Wöhler, "On the Artificial Production of Urea"
- Charles Lyell, "Geological Evolution" from Principles of Geology
- Galileo, "The Starry Messenger"
- Tommaso Campanella, "Arguments for and against Galileo" from The Defense of Galileo
- Michael Faraday, The Chemical History of a Candle
- Dmitri Mendeleev, "The Genesis of a Law of Nature" from The Periodic Law of the Chemical Elements
- Hermann von Helmholtz, "On the Conservation of Force"
- Albert Einstein and Leopold Infeld, "The Rise and Decline of Classical Physics" from The Evolution of Physics
- Arthur Eddington, "The Running-Down of the Universe" from Nature and the Physical World
- James Jeans, "Beginnings and Endings" from The Universe Around Us
- Kees Boeke, "Cosmic View"

Volume 9: Mathematics

- Lancelot Hogben, "Mathematics, the Mirror of Civilization" from Mathematics for the Million
- Andrew Russell Forsyth, "Mathematics, in Life and Thought"
- Alfred North Whitehead, "On Mathematical Method" from An Introduction to Mathematics, "On the Nature of a Calculus"
- Bertrand Russell, "The Study of Mathematics", "Mathematics and the Metaphysicians", "Definition of Number"
- Edward Kasner and James R. Newman, "New Names for Old", "Beyond the Googol"
- Tobias Dantzig, "Fingerprints", "The Empty Column"
- Leonhard Euler, "The Seven Bridges of Königsberg "
- Norman Robert Campbell, "Measurement", "Numerical Laws and the Use of Mathematics in Science"
- William Clifford, "The Postulates of the Science of Space"
- Henri Poincaré, "Space", "Mathematical Creation"; "Chance"
- Pierre-Simon Laplace, "Probability" from A Philosophical Essay on Probabilities
- Charles Sanders Peirce, "The Red and the Black"

Volume 10: Philosophical Essays

- John Erskine, "The Moral Obligation to Be Intelligent"
- William Clifford, "The Ethics of Belief"
- William James, "The Will to Believe", "The Sentiment of Rationality"
- John Dewey, "The Process of Thought" from How We Think
- Epicurus, "Letter to Herodotus"; "Letter to Menoeceus"
- Epictetus, The Enchiridion
- Walter Pater, "The Art of Life" from The Renaissance
- Plutarch, "Contentment"
- Cicero, "On Friendship"; "On Old Age"
- Francis Bacon, "Of Truth"; "Of Death"; "Of Adversity"; "Of Love"; "Of Friendship"; "Of Anger"
- George Santayana, "Lucretius"; "Goethe's Faust"
- Henry Adams, "St. Thomas Aquinas" from Mont-Saint-Michel and Chartres
- Voltaire, "The Philosophy of Common Sense"
- John Stuart Mill, "Nature"
- Ralph Waldo Emerson, "Nature"; "Self-Reliance"; "Montaigne; or, the Skeptic"
- William Hazlitt, "On the Feeling of Immortality in Youth"
- Thomas Browne, "Immortality" from Urn-Burial

== See also ==
- Chapter 16 of the book How to Read a Book by Mortimer Adler, which includes some discussion of the Gateway set.
