= Synopticon =

Synopticon may refer to:

- The concept of Surveillance of the few by the many, as identified by sociologist Thomas Mathiesen
- Synopticon, a 1996 interactive art installation by electronic music band Coldcut
- Synopticon, an 1880 book by W. G. Rushbrooke concerning Gospel Harmony
- A Syntopicon: An Index to The Great Ideas, compiled in 1952 by Mortimer Adler

== See also ==
- Panopticism
