= The Pupil (short story) =

- Short story by Henry James
- Country: United Kingdom
- Language: English
- Genre: Short story

Publication
- Published in: Longman's Magazine
- Publication type: Periodical
- Media type: Print (Magazine)
- Publication date: March–April 1891
- Pages: 40 pp

"The Pupil" is a short story by Henry James, first published in Longman's Magazine in 1891. It is the emotional story of a precocious young boy growing up in a mendacious and dishonorable family. He befriends his tutor, who is the only adult in his life that he can trust. James presents their relationship with sympathy and insight, and the story reaches what some would consider the status of classical tragedy.

== Plot summary ==
Pemberton, a penniless graduate of Oxford, takes a job to tutor Morgan Moreen, aged eleven, a brilliant and somewhat cynical member of a wandering American family. His mother and father refuse to pay Pemberton as they jump their bills from one hotel to another in Europe. Pemberton grows to dislike all the Moreens except Morgan, including older brother Ulick and sisters Paula and Amy.

Morgan, who is afflicted with heart trouble, advises Pemberton to escape his family's baleful influence. But Pemberton stays on because he has come to love and admire his pupil and he hopes for at least some eventual payment. Pemberton finally has to take another tutoring job in London simply to make ends meet. He is summoned back to Paris, though, by a telegram from the Moreens that says Morgan has fallen ill.

It turns out that Morgan is healthy enough, though the fatal day arrives when his family is evicted from their hotel for nonpayment. Morgan's parents beg Pemberton to take their son away with him while they try to find some money. Morgan is ecstatic at the prospect of leaving with Pemberton, but the tutor hesitates. Morgan suddenly collapses with a heart attack and dies. In the story's ironic final note, James says that Morgan's father takes his son's death with the perfect manner of "a man of the world."

== Major themes ==
To use the phrase of James's secretary Theodora Bosanquet, Morgan is one of the novelist's "children of light," people with insight and delicacy who are often ground down by harsh, unforgiving environments. In Morgan's case that environment is tragically provided by his own family. That's why the boy clings so ardently to Pemberton, a tutor who truly appreciates Morgan's ability and decency and offers a possible escape from the deceitful, mediocre Moreen troupe.

When the moment of opportunity comes, though, Pemberton hesitates. His reservations are understandable; he has no financial resources to take on the responsibility of raising a teen-aged boy. But that bit of hesitancy proves fatal. Once again, one of James's honorable and intelligent characters succumbs to inescapable reality.

There has been much talk about the exact nature of the relationship between Pemberton and Morgan, with some commentators intimating a homosexual/paedophile attachment. Although there is no overt hint of a sexual relationship in the story, tutor and pupil do establish a bond of love and respect, which shines in contrast to the mundane, unimaginative world of the other Moreens: "Pemberton held him fast, hands on his shoulders — he had never loved him so."

But the relationship between the two can be interpreted through the lens of sadomasochism. The sadomasochistic undertones can be best seen in the scene in which the pair speak of "beating" each other. Furthermore, Morgan's death can be interpreted as la petite mort as the child become euphoric at the prospect of leaving with his tutor.

== Critical evaluation ==
Critic Robert Gale flatly called The Pupil "one of the finest short stories ever written," and few commentators have disagreed. Mortimer Adler included the story in his Gateway to the Great Books series.

Besides the dispute about possible homosexual overtones in the relationship between Morgan and Pemberton, critics have also disagreed about how much responsibility the tutor bears for the boy's sudden collapse and death. There's no doubt that Morgan is disappointed when he sees Pemberton hesitate about taking him away from his worthless family. As mentioned before, that hesitation is understandable but Pemberton still falls short of heroic action in an admittedly difficult situation. And as Lionel Trilling observed about the story, sometimes a man is a hero or he is nothing at all.

== Adaptations ==
- The Pupil was adapted into a play, The Magpies, by Michael Dyne and performed as an episode in the ITV Television Playhouse drama (7 February 1957), starring Laurence Payne as Pemberton and Andrew Irvine as Morgan.
- The Pupil was also adapted into a French film, L'Élève, in 1996, starring Vincent Cassel as Pemberton and Caspar Salmon as Morgan.
