= Introduction to Metaphysics =

Introduction to Metaphysics may refer to:

- Introduction to Metaphysics
- "Introduction to Metaphysics" (essay), a 1903 essay by Henri Bergson
- Introduction to Metaphysics (Heidegger book), a 1953 book by Martin Heidegger
