= Physics (Aristotle) =

Treatise by Aristotle

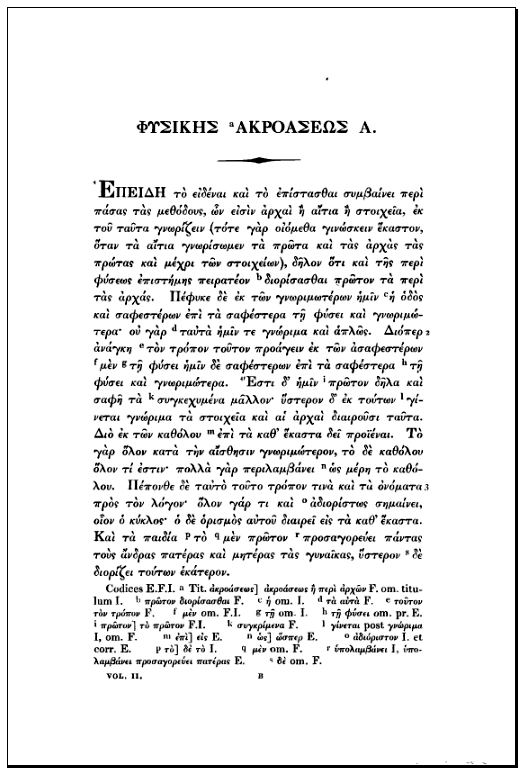
First page of text, Volume 2, of a work less formally known as "the Oxford Aristotle", with the usual label Ex Recensione Immanuelis Bekkeri appended to the title. The translation of ex is equivocal in English; it could mean "of" or "from", not helpful in this case. The image is not the original publication of Bekker's recension from which the standard Bekker numbers are derived. Indeed, Bekker numbers do not appear at all, though the recension is Bekker's, and the book and chapter numbers derived from the age of manuscripts (not known when) are used. For Bekker's arrangement, see the 1831 edition published by the Academia Regia Borussica in Berlin. (Note: An explanation of Bekker numbering along with an image of Page 184, the start of Physics, is to be found in "How to Cite Aristotle" (PDF). Schenectady, NY: Union College.)

The Physics (Ancient Greek: Φυσικής ἀκρόασις, romanized: Physikḗs akróasis, or: Φυσικής ακροάσεως, Physikḗs akroáseōs; Latin: Physica or Naturales Auscultationes, possibly meaning "Lectures on nature") is an ancient Greek text collated from a collection of surviving manuscripts known as the Corpus Aristotelicum and attributed to the 4th-century BC philosopher Aristotle.

== The meaning of physics in Aristotle ==
It is a collection of treatises or lessons that deals with the most general (philosophical) principles of natural or moving things, both living and non-living, rather than physical theories (in the modern sense) or investigations of the particular contents of the universe. The chief purpose of the work is to discover the principles and causes of (and not merely to describe) change, or movement, or motion (κίνησις kinesis), especially that of natural wholes (mostly living things, but also inanimate wholes like the cosmos). In the conventional Andronicean ordering of Aristotle's works, it stands at the head of, as well as being foundational to, the long series of physical, cosmological and biological treatises, whose ancient Greek title, τὰ φυσικά, means "the [writings] on nature" or "natural philosophy".

== Description of the content ==
The Physics is composed of eight books, which are further divided into chapters. This system is of ancient origin, now obscure. In modern languages, books are referenced with Roman numerals, standing for ancient Greek capital letters (the Greeks represented numbers with letters, e.g. A for 1). Chapters are identified by Arabic numerals, but the use of the English word "chapter" is strictly conventional. Ancient "chapters" (capita) are generally very short, often less than a page. Additionally, the Bekker numbers give the page and column (a or b) used in the Prussian Academy of Sciences' edition of Aristotle's works, instigated and managed by Bekker himself. These are evident in the 1831 2-volume edition. Bekker's line numbers may be given. These are often given, but unless the edition is the Academy's, they do match any line counts.

=== Book I (Α; 184a–192b) ===
Book I introduces Aristotle's approach to nature, which is to be based on principles, causes, and elements. Before offering his particular views, he engages previous theories, such as those offered by Melissus and Parmenides. Aristotle's own view comes out in Ch. 7 where he identifies three principles: substances, opposites, and privation.

Chapters 3 and 4 are among the most difficult in all of Aristotle's works and involve subtle refutations of the thought of Parmenides, Melissus and Anaxagoras.

In chapter 5, he continues his review of his predecessors, particularly how many first principles there are. Chapter 6 narrows down the number of principles to two or three. He presents his own account of the subject in chapter 7, where he first introduces the word matter (Greek: hyle) to designate fundamental essence (ousia). He defines matter in chapter 9: "For my definition of matter is just this—the primary substratum of each thing, from which it comes to be without qualification, and which persists in the result."

Matter in Aristotle's thought is, however, defined in terms of sensible reality; for example, a horse eats grass: the horse changes the grass into itself; the grass as such does not persist in the horse, but some aspect of it – its matter – does. Matter is not specifically described, but consists of whatever is apart from quality or quantity and that of which something may be predicated. Matter in this understanding does not exist independently (i.e. as a substance), but exists interdependently (i.e. as a "principle") with form and only insofar as it underlies change. Matter and form are analogical terms.

=== Book II (Β; 192b–200b) ===
Book II identifies "nature" (physis) as "a source or cause of being moved and of being at rest in that to which it belongs primarily" (1.192b21). Thus, those entities are natural which are capable of starting to move, e.g. growing, acquiring qualities, displacing themselves, and finally being born and dying. Aristotle contrasts natural things with the artificial: artificial things can move also, but they move according to what they are made of, not according to what they are. For example, if a wooden bed were buried and somehow sprouted as a tree, it would be according to what it is made of, not what it is. Aristotle contrasts two senses of nature: nature as matter and nature as form or definition.

By "nature", Aristotle means the natures of particular things and would perhaps be better translated "a nature." In Book II, however, his appeal to "nature" as a source of activities is more typically to the genera of natural kinds (the secondary substance). But, contra Plato, Aristotle attempts to resolve a philosophical quandary that was well understood in the fourth century. The Eudoxian planetary model sufficed for the wandering stars, but no deduction of terrestrial substance would be forthcoming based solely on the mechanical principles of necessity, (ascribed by Aristotle to material causation in chapter 9). In the Enlightenment, centuries before modern science made good on atomist intuitions, a nominal allegiance to mechanistic materialism gained popularity despite harboring Newton's action at distance, and comprising the native habitat of teleological arguments: Machines or artifacts composed of parts lacking any intrinsic relationship to each other with their order imposed from without. Thus, the source of an apparent thing's activities is not the whole itself, but its parts. While Aristotle asserts that the matter (and parts) are a necessary cause of things – the material cause – he says that nature is primarily the essence or formal cause (1.193b6), that is, the information, the whole species itself.

The necessary in nature, then, is plainly what we call by the name of matter, and the changes in it. Both causes must be stated by the physicist, but especially the end; for that is the cause of the matter, not vice versa; and the end is 'that for the sake of which', and the beginning starts from the definition or essence…

— Aristotle, Physics II 9

In chapter 3, Aristotle presents his theory of the four causes (material, efficient, formal, and final). Material cause explains what something is made of (for example, the wood of a house), formal cause explains the form which a thing follows to become that thing (the plans of an architect to build a house), efficient cause is the actual source of the change (the physical building of the house), and final cause is the intended purpose of the change (the final product of the house and its purpose as a shelter and home).

Of particular importance is the final cause or purpose (telos). It is a common mistake to conceive of the four causes as additive or alternative forces pushing or pulling; in reality, all four are needed to explain (7.198a22-25). What we typically mean by cause in the modern scientific idiom is only a narrow part of what Aristotle means by efficient cause. He contrasts purpose with the way in which "nature" does not work, chance (or luck), discussed in chapters 4, 5, and 6. (Chance working in the actions of humans is tuche and in unreasoning agents automaton.) Something happens by chance when all the lines of causality converge without that convergence being purposefully chosen, and produce a result similar to the teleologically caused one.

In chapters 7 through 9, Aristotle returns to the discussion of nature. With the enrichment of the preceding four chapters, he concludes that nature acts for an end, and he discusses the way that necessity is present in natural things. For Aristotle, the motion of natural things is determined from within them, while in the modern empirical sciences, motion is determined from without (more properly speaking: there is nothing to have an inside).

=== Book III (Γ; 200b–208a) ===
In order to understand "nature" as defined in the previous book, one must understand the terms of the definition. To understand motion, book III begins with the definition of change based on Aristotle's notions of potentiality and actuality. Change, he says, is the actualization of a thing's ability insofar as it is able.

The rest of the book (chapters 4-8) discusses the infinite (apeiron, the unlimited). He distinguishes between the infinite by addition and the infinite by division, and between the actually infinite and potentially infinite. He argues against the actually infinite in any form, including infinite bodies, substances, and voids. Aristotle here says the only type of infinity that exists is the potentially infinite. Aristotle characterizes this as that which serves as "the matter for the completion of a magnitude and is potentially (but not actually) the completed whole" (207a22-23). The infinite, lacking any form, is thereby unknowable. Aristotle writes, "it is not what has nothing outside it that is infinite, but what always has something outside it" (6.206b33-207a1-2).

=== Book IV (Δ; 208a–223b) ===
Book IV discusses the preconditions of motion: place (topos, chapters 1-5), void (kenon, chapters 6-9), and time (khronos, chapters 10-14). The book starts by distinguishing the various ways a thing can "be in" another. He likens place to an immobile container or vessel: "the innermost motionless boundary of what contains" is the primary place of a body (4.212a20). Unlike space, which is a volume co-existent with a body, place is a boundary or surface.

He teaches that, contrary to the Atomists and others, a void is not only unnecessary, but leads to contradictions, e.g., making locomotion impossible.

Time is a constant attribute of movements and, Aristotle thinks, does not exist on its own but is relative to the motions of things. Tony Roark describes Aristotle's view of time as follows:

Aristotle defines time as "a number of motion with respect to the before and after" (Phys. 219b1–2), by which he intends to denote motion's susceptibility to division into undetached parts of arbitrary length, a property that it possesses both by virtue of its intrinsic nature and also by virtue of the capacities and activities of percipient souls. Motion is intrinsically indeterminate, but perceptually determinable, with respect to its length. Acts of perception function as determiners; the result is determinate units of kinetic length, which is precisely what a temporal unit is.

=== Books V and VI (Ε: 224a–231a; Ζ: 231a–241b) ===
Books V and VI deal with how motion occurs. Book V classifies four species of movement, depending on where the opposites are located. Movement categories include quantity (e.g. a change in dimensions, from great to small), quality (as for colors: from pale to dark), place (local movements generally go from up downwards and vice versa), or, more controversially, substance. In fact, substances do not have opposites, so it is inappropriate to say that something properly becomes, from not-man, man: generation and corruption are not kinesis in the full sense.

Book VI discusses how a changing thing can reach the opposite state, if it has to pass through infinite intermediate stages. It investigates by rational and logical arguments the notions of continuity and division, establishing that change—and, consequently, time and place—are not divisible into indivisible parts; they are not mathematically discrete but continuous, that is, infinitely divisible (in other words, that you cannot build up a continuum out of discrete or indivisible points or moments). Among other things, this implies that there can be no definite (indivisible) moment when a motion begins. This discussion, together with that of speed and the different behavior of the four different species of motion, eventually helps Aristotle answer the famous paradoxes of Zeno, which purport to show the absurdity of motion's existence.

=== Book VII (Η; 241a25–250b7) ===
Book VII briefly deals with the relationship of the moved to his mover, which Aristotle describes in substantial divergence with Plato's theory of the soul as capable of setting itself in motion (Laws book X, Phaedrus, Phaedo). Everything which moves is moved by another. He then tries to correlate the species of motion and their speeds, with the local change (locomotion, phorà) as the most fundamental to which the others can be reduced.

Book VII.1-3 also exist in an alternative version, not included in the Bekker edition.

=== Book VIII (Θ; 250a14–267b26) ===
Book VIII (which occupies almost a fourth of the entire Physics, and probably constituted originally an independent course of lessons) discusses two main topics, though with a wide deployment of arguments: the time limits of the universe, and the existence of a Prime Mover — eternal, indivisible, without parts and without magnitude. Isn't the universe eternal, has it had a beginning, will it ever end? Aristotle's response, as a Greek, could hardly be affirmative, never having been told of a creatio ex nihilo, but he also has philosophical reasons for denying that motion had not always existed, on the grounds of the theory presented in the earlier books of the Physics. Eternity of motion is also confirmed by the existence of a substance which is different from all the others in lacking matter; being pure form, it is also in an eternal actuality, not being imperfect in any respect; hence needing not to move. This is demonstrated by describing the celestial bodies thus: the first things to be moved must undergo an infinite, single and continuous movement, that is, circular. This is not caused by any contact but (integrating the view contained in the Metaphysics, bk. XII) by love and aspiration.

== Significance to philosophy and science in the modern world ==
The works of Aristotle are typically influential to the development of Western science and philosophy. The citations below are not given as any sort of final modern judgement on the interpretation and significance of Aristotle, but are only the notable views of some moderns.

=== Heidegger ===
Martin Heidegger writes:

The Physics is a lecture in which he seeks to determine beings that arise on their own, τὰ φύσει ὄντα, with regard to their being. Aristotelian "physics" is different from what we mean today by this word, not only to the extent that it belongs to antiquity whereas the modern physical sciences belong to modernity, rather above all it is different by virtue of the fact that Aristotle's "physics" is philosophy, whereas modern physics is a positive science that presupposes a philosophy.... This book determines the warp and woof of the whole of Western thinking, even at that place where it, as modern thinking, appears to think at odds with ancient thinking. But opposition is invariably comprised of a decisive, and often even perilous, dependence. Without Aristotle's Physics there would have been no Galileo.

=== Russell ===
Bertrand Russell says of Physics and On the Heavens (which he believed was a continuation of Physics) that they were:

...extremely influential, and dominated science until the time of Galileo ... The historian of philosophy, accordingly, must study them, in spite of the fact that hardly a sentence in either can be accepted in the light of modern science.

=== Rovelli ===
Italian theoretical physicist Carlo Rovelli considers Aristotle's physics as a correct and non-intuitive special case of Newtonian physics for the motion of matter in fluid after it has reached terminal velocity (steady state). His theory disregards the initial phase of acceleration, which is too short to be observed by the naked eye. Galileo's inclined plane experiment bypasses the issue, as it slows down acceleration enough to allow observing the initial phase of acceleration by the naked eye.

The five elements explain forms of observed motions. Ether explains circular motion in the sky, earth and water explains downward motion, and fire and air explains upward motion. To explain downward motion, instead of postulating one element, he proposed two, because wood moves up in water but down in air, while earth moves down in both water and air. The complex interaction between the 4 elements could explain most of the rising and falling motions of objects with different densities.

The velocity of falling objects is equal to $C\left(\frac{W}{\rho}\right)^n$, where $W$ is the weight of the object, $\rho$ is the density of the surrounding fluid (such as air, fire, or water), $n > 0$ is a constant, and $C$ is a constant depending on the shape of the object. This is correct for the terminal velocity of falling objects in fluid in a constant gravitational field, in the case where most of the fluid resistance is drag force, $\propto \rho v^2$. In this case, the terminal velocity is $C\left(\frac{W}{\rho}\right)^{1/2}$

== See also ==
- History of physics
- Horror vacui
- Euclid's Elements

== Bibliography ==
=== Recensions of Physics in the ancient Greek ===
A recension is a selection of a specific text for publication. The manuscripts on a given work attributed to Aristotle offer textual variants. One recension makes a selection of one continuous text, but typically gives notes stating the alternative sections of text. Determining which text is to be presented as "original" is a detailed scholarly investigation. The recension is often known by its scholarly editor's name.

- Aristotle, Physics. Greek text with translation by P. H. Wicksteed, F. M. Cornford. Loeb Classical Library 228, 255. Cambridge, MA: Harvard University Press, 1934–57.
- Aristotle, Physica. Ed. W. D. Ross. Oxford University Press, 1951. ISBN 9780198145141.
- Aristotle (1936). W.D. Ross (ed.). Aristotle's Physics. A Revised Text with Introduction and Commentary. Oxford: University Press. doi:10.1017/S0009840X00076721. S2CID 162514411.
- Aristotelis (1879). Volumen Secundum Continens Ethica, Naturalem Auscultationem, de Caelo, de Generatione et Metaphysica, cum Indice Nominum et Rerum. Opera Omnia (in Ancient Greek and Latin). Parisiis: Editore Ambrosio Firmin Didot.
- Aristotle; Fredericus Syllburgius (1837). Bekkeri, Immanuelis (ed.). Naturalis Auscultationis Libri VIII; De Caelo Libri IV; De Generatione et Corruptione Libri II. Aristotelis Opera; Accedunt Indices Syllburgiani (in Ancient Greek). Vol. Tomus II. Oxonii: E Typographeo Academico.
  - ——; —— (1837). Naturalis Auscultationis Libri VIII; De Caelo Libri IV; De Generatione et Corruptione Libri II. Internet Archive. Different formats for display and downloading are available.
  - ——; —— (1837). Naturalis Auscultationis Libri VIII; De Caelo Libri IV; De Generatione et Corruptione Libri II (PDF). Institute for the Study of Nature. A pdf file.
- Aristotelis (1831). Physicorum Libri VIII. Aristotelis Opera Omnia V. I (in Ancient Greek). Lipsiae: Sumptibus et Typis Car. Tauchnitii.
- Aristoteles (1831). Immanuelis Bekkeri (ed.). ΦΥΣΙΚΗΣ ΑΚΡΟΑΣΕΩΣ (PDF) (in Ancient Greek). Vol. Prius. Berolini: Academia Regia Borussica (Prussian Academy of Sciences).

=== English translations of the Physics ===
In reverse chronological order:

- Aristotle (2018). Physics. Translated by Reeve, C. D. C. Cambridge, MA: Hackett Publishing Company.
- Aristotle (2017). Koutrouby, Gregory (ed.). Physics. Translated by Hardie, R.P.; Gaye, R.K. Dover Publications. ISBN 978-0-486-81351-6. A republication of the 1930 edition. Available as an ebook.
- Aristotle (2005). Physics, or, Natural Hearing. Translated by Coughlin, Glen. South Bend: St. Augustine's Press.
- Aristotle (1999). Bostock, David (ed.). Physics. Translated by Waterfield, Robin. Oxford: University Press.
- Aristotle (1999). Physics: Book VIII. Clarendon Aristotle Series. Translated by Graham, Daniel W. Oxford: University Press.
- Aristotle (1995). Aristotle's Physics: A Guided Study. Translated by Sachs, Joe. New Brunswick, NJ: Rutgers University Press.
- Aristotle (1984). Physics: Books I and II. Clarendon Aristotle Series. Translated by Charlton, William. Oxford: University Press.
- Aristotle (1983). Physics: Books III and IV. Clarendon Aristotle Series. Translated by Hussey, Edward. Oxford: University Press.
- Aristotle (1969). Physics. Translated by Apostle, Hippocrates G. Bloomington: Indiana University Press.
- Aristotle (1961). Aristotle's Physics; with an Analytical Index of Technical Terms (PDF). Translated by Hope, Richard. Lincoln: University of Nebraska Press.
- Aristotle (1940). Lectures on the Science of Natures, Books I-IV. Translated by Wallis, Charles Glenn. Annapolis: The St. John's Bookstore. OCLC 37790727. Also includes On Coming-To-Be and Ceasing-To-Be I.4-5; On The Generation Of Animals I.22.
- Aristotle (1935). Aristotle; containing selections from seven of the most important books of Aristotle ... Natural science, the Metaphysics, Zoology, Psychology, the Nicomachean ethics, On statecraft, and the Art of poetry. Translated by Wheelwright, Philip. New York: Odyssey Press. OCLC 3363066. Includes Physics I-II, III.1, VIII.
- Aristotle (1934). Physics Books 5-8. Loeb Classical Library 255. Translated by Wicksteed, P.H.; Cornford, F.M. Cambridge, Massachusetts: Harvard University Press. This is the oldest of Loeb 255, reprinted or reissued many times subsequently under different subseries: Volume 5 of a 23-volume Aristotle set or Volume 2 of a 2-volume Aristotle Physics set. The terminology Volume 5, Volume 2, Volume 255 is apt to be confusing. Whatever the volume and printing date, Loeb 255 is still in copyright and therefore cannot be offered as a work in the public domain.
- Aristotle (1930). "Physica". In Ross, W.D. (ed.). The Works of Aristotle. Vol. II. Translated by Hardie, R.P.; Gaye, R.K. Oxford: University Press.
  - —— (1930). Physica. Internet Archive. Scanned as is. Includes the translators' emphases and divisions within chapters.
  - —— (1930). Physics. University of Adelaide Library. Archived from the original on 2014-09-29. Formatted text divided into books and chapters only.
  - —— (1930). Physics. Internet Classics Archive. Archived from the original on 2011-01-06. Minimally formatted text divided into books and "parts." Book IV is incomplete.
  - —— (1930). 07. Aristotle, Physics: Entire. Wildman's Weird Wild Web (a professorial site at Boston University). Single text file arranged in paragraphs.
  - —— (1930). Physics. Greek Texts. Minimally formatted single pages accessed one at a time.
  - —— (1930). Physics (PDF). PinkMonkey.com. Single pdf file of books and chapters.
- Aristotle (1929). Physics Books 1-4. Loeb Classical Library 228. Translated by Wicksteed, P.H.; Cornford, F.M. Cambridge, Massachusetts: Harvard University Press. This is the oldest of Loeb 228, reprinted or reissued many times subsequently under different subseries: Volume 4 of a 23-volume Aristotle set or Volume 1 of a 2-volume Aristotle Physics set. The terminology Volume 4, Volume 1, Volume 228 is apt to be confusing. Whatever the volume and printing date, Loeb 228 is still in copyright and therefore cannot be offered as a work in the public domain.
- Aristotle; Simplicius (1806). The Physics or Physical Auscultation of Aristotle. Translated from the Greek with Copious Notes, in Which the Substance is given of the Invaluable Commentaries of Simplicius. Collected works.English.Taylor. Translated by Taylor, Thomas. London: Robert Wiles. hdl:2027/nyp.33433000341705.

=== Classical and medieval commentaries on the Physics ===
A commentary differs from a note in being a distinct work analyzing the language and subsumed concepts of some other work classically notable. A note appears within the annotated work on the same page or in a separate list. Commentaries are typically arranged by lemmas, or quotes from the notable work, followed by an analysis of the author of the commentary.

The commentaries on every work of Aristotle are a vast and mainly unpublished topic. They extend continuously from the death of the philosopher, representing the entire history of Graeco-Roman philosophy. There are thousands of commentators and commentaries known wholly or more typically in fragments of manuscripts. The latter especially occupy the vaults of institutions formerly responsible for copying them, such as monasteries. The process of publishing them is slow and ongoing.

Below is a brief representative bibliography of published commentaries on Aristotle's Physics available on or through the Internet. Like the topic itself, they are perforce multi-cultural, but English has been favored, as well as the original languages, ancient Greek and Latin.

- Aquinas, Thomas (1999). Commentary on Aristotle's Physics. Translated by Richard J. Blackwell; Richard J. Spath; W. Edmund Thirlkel. Notre Dame, Indiana: Dumb Ox Books.
- Averroes (1991). Averroes' questions in physics: from the unpublished Sêfer ha-derûšîm ha-tibʼîyîm. Translated by Helen Tunik Goldstein. Dordrecht; Boston: Kluwer Academic Publishers.
- Buridani, Johanis (1509). Dullaert, Johanne (ed.). Acutissimi philosophi reverendi magistri Johannis Buridani subtilissime questiones super octo Phisicorum libros Aristotelis diligenter recognite et revise a magistro Johanne Dullaert de Gandavo antea nusquam impresse (in Latin). Parhisiis: Opera ac industria magistri P. Ledru, impensis ... D. Roce.
- Conimbricenses (1592). Commentarii Collegii Conimbricensis Societatis Iesu. In octo libros Physicorum Aristotelis Stagiritae (in Latin). Conimbricae: typis et expensis Antonij à Mariz.
- Jean de Jandun; Elias Cretensis (1551). Ioannis de Ianduno ... Super octo libros Aristotelis De physico auditu subtilissimae quaestiones: ... Eliae etiam hebraei Cretensis Quaestiones: uidelicet de primo motore, de mundi efficientia, de esse & essentia, & uno cum eiusdem in dictis Averrois super eosdem libros annotationibus quàm castigatissimae leguntur duo demum horum onium extant indices: alter questionum ac conclusionum singulorum librorum nuper additus, alter totius operis notabilia quaeque accuratissime demonstrans: ... (in Latin). Venetiis: apud Iuntas.
- Johannis maioris hadigtonani theologi (1526). Octo libri physicorum, cum philosophia atque metaphysica (in Latin). Parisiensis: a Johanne Paruo.
- William of Ockham (1990). "I. On the Notion of Knowledge or Science (Prologus in Expositionem super viii libros Physicorum)". In Stephen F. Brown (ed.). Philosophical Writings: A Selection (in Latin and English). Translated by Philotheus Boehner. Indianapolis; Cambridge: Hackett Publishing Company.
- —— (1989). George Marcil (ed.). Ockham on Aristotle's Physics; A Translation of Ockham's Brevis Summa Libri Physicorum. Text Series No. 17. Translated by Julian Davies. St. Bonaventure, New York: The Franciscan Institute. ISBN 9781576590607.
- Philoponus (2006). Richard Sorabji (ed.). On Aristotle Physics 1.1-3. Ancient Commentators on Aristotle. Translated by Catherine Osborne. Ithaca, N.Y.: Cornell University Press.
- —— (2009). —— (ed.). On Aristotle Physics 1.4-9. Ancient Commentators on Aristotle. Translated by Catherine Osborne. London: Duckworth.
- —— (1993). —— (ed.). On Aristotle Physics 2. Ancient Commentators on Aristotle. Translated by A.R. Lacey. Ithaca, N.Y.: Cornell University Press.
- —— (1994). —— (ed.). On Aristotle Physics 3. Ancient Commentators on Aristotle. Translated by M.I. Edwards. Ithaca, N.Y.: Cornell University Press.
- —— (2012). —— (ed.). On Aristotle Physics 4.1-5. Ancient Commentators on Aristotle. Translated by Keimpe Algra; Johannes M. van Ophuijsen. London: Bristol Classical Press.
- —— (2012). —— (ed.). On Aristotle Physics 4.6-9. Ancient Commentators on Aristotle. Translated by Pamela M. Huby. London: Bristol Classical Press.
- Ramus, Petrus (Pierre de la Ramée), Scholarum physicarum libro octo... (Frankfurt: A Wecheli, 1683).
- Simplicius, On Aristotle's Physics, trans. (various) (Ithaca: Cornell University Press, Ancient Commentators on Aristotle series, 1993–2006).
- Romanus, Aegidius (Giles of Rome), In Octo Libros Physicorum Aristoteles (Venedig, 1502; Frankfurt: Minerva GMBH, 1968).
- Soto, Domingo de, Super octo libros physicorum Aristotelis quaestiones (Salamanca, 1555).
- Themistius, On the Physics (London: Bristol Classical Press, 2012).

=== Some modern commentaries, monographs and articles ===
- Bolotin, David (1997). An approach to Aristotle's physics: with particular attention to the role of his manner of writing. New York State: SUNY Press.
- Bostock, David (2006). Space, Time, Matter, and Form: Essays on Aristotle's Physics. Oxford Aristotle Studies. Oxford: University Press.
- Brague, Rémi (1990). "Aristotle's Definition of Motion and Its Ontological Implications". Graduate Faculty Philosophy Journal. 13 (2). Translated by Pierre Adler; Laurent d'Ursel: 1–22. doi:10.5840/gfpj19901321. Aristotle's definition of motion, meaning any sort of a change, a technical concept from the Theory of Matter and Form, is especially difficult for moderns unfamiliar with the philosophy to understand. It is the actualization (the becoming visible) of a new instance of a form (or system of forms) in matter that has a potency (capability to receive) for it. Brague makes the attempt to elucidate to moderns.
- Connell, Richard J. (1966). Matter and Becoming. Chicago: Priory Press.
- —— (1995). Nature's Causes. Revisioning Philosophy; Vol. 21. New York: P. Lang.
- Coope, Ursula (2005). Time for Aristotle: Physics IV.10–14. Oxford: University Press.
- Corazzon, Raul (2016). "The Rediscovery of the Corpus Aristotelicum and the Birth of Aristotelianism" (PDF). Theory and History of Ontology.
- Gerson, Lloyd P., ed. (1999). Aristotle: Critical Assessments. Vol. 2: Physics, Cosmology and Biology. New York: Routledge. Collects these papers:
  - Van Fraassen, Bas C. (1980). "A Re-examination of Aristotle's Philosophy of Science". Dialogue. 19 (1): 20–45. doi:10.1017/s0012217300024719. S2CID 170882853.
  - Code, Alan (1976). "The Persistence of Aristotelian Matter". Philosophical Studies. 29 (6): 357–67. doi:10.1007/bf00646313. S2CID 171045703.
  - Kosman, Aryeh (1969). "Aristotle's Definition of Motion" (PDF). Phronesis. 14 (1): 40–62. doi:10.1163/156852869x00037. S2CID 9607748. Archived from the original (PDF) on 2017-12-07.
  - Graham, Daniel W. (1988). "Aristotle's Definition of Motion". Ancient Philosophy. 8 (2): 209–15. doi:10.5840/ancientphil1988824.
  - Cohen, Sheldon M. (1994). "Aristotle on Elemental Motion". Phronesis. 39 (2): 150–9. doi:10.1163/156852894321052153.
  - Bradie, Michael; Miller, Fred D. Jr. (1984). "Teleology and Natural Necessity in Aristotle". History of Philosophy Quarterly. 1 (2): 133–46.
  - Meyer, Susan Sauve (1992). "Aristotle, Teleology, and Reduction". The Philosophical Review. 101 (4): 791–825. doi:10.2307/2185925. JSTOR 2185925.
  - Lennox, James G. (1984). "Aristotle on Chance". Archiv für Geschichte der Philosophie. 66 (1): 52–60. doi:10.1515/agph.1984.66.1.52. S2CID 144352743.
  - Gill, Mary Louise (1980). "Aristotle's Theory of Causal Action in "Physics III 3"". Phronesis. 25 (1): 129–47. doi:10.1163/156852880x00089.
  - Bostock, David (1980). "Aristotle's Account of Time". Phronesis. 25 (2): 148–69. doi:10.1163/156852880X00098.
  - —— (1995). "Aristotle on the Transmutation of the Elements in De Generatione et Corruptione 1.1–4". Oxford Studies in Ancient Philosophy. 13: 217–29. doi:10.1093/oso/9780198250005.003.0010. ISBN 978-0-19-825000-5.
    - Brad Inwood. "1996.6.6, Taylor, ed., Oxford Studies in Ancient Philosophy XIII". Bryn Mawr Classical Review.
  - Freeland, Cynthia A. (1990). "Scientific Explanation and Empirical Data in Aristotle's Meteorology". Oxford Studies in Ancient Philosophy. 8: 67–102.
  - Matthen, Mohan; Hankinson, R.J. (1993). "Aristotle's Universe: Its Form and Matter". Synthese. 96 (3): 417–35. doi:10.1007/bf01064010. S2CID 46967012.
  - Charles, David (1991). "Aristotle on Substance, Essence and Biological Kinds". Proceedings of the Boston Area Colloquium in Ancient Philosophy. 7 (1): 227–61. doi:10.1163/2213441791x00132.
  - Granger, Herbert (1984). "Aristotle on Genus and Differentia". Journal of the History of Philosophy. 22: 1–23. doi:10.1353/hph.1984.0001. S2CID 171032584.
  - Matthen, Mohan (1989). "The Four Causes in Aristotle's Embryology". Apeiron. 22 (4): 159–79. doi:10.1515/apeiron.1989.22.4.159. S2CID 171238235.
  - Code, Alan (1987). "Soul as Efficient Cause in Aristotle's Embryology'". Philosophical Topics. 15 (2): 51–59. doi:10.5840/philtopics19871524.
  - Depew, David J. (1995). "Human and Other Political Animals in Aristotle's 'History of Animals'". Phronesis. 40 (2): 156–81. doi:10.1163/156852895321051937.
  - Tress, Daryl McGowan (1992). "The Metaphysical Science of Aristotle's 'Generation of Animals' and its Feminist Critics". Review of Metaphysics. 46: 307–41. ISBN 9780415916028.
  - Sprague, Rosamond Kent (1991). "Plants as Aristotelian Substances" (PDF). Illinois Classical Studies. 56: 221–9. Archived from the original (PDF) on 2017-08-15.
- Grote, George (1880). Bain, Alexander; Robertson, G.Croom (eds.). Aristotle (2nd ed.). London: John Murray.
- Judson, Lindsay, ed. (1991). Aristotle's Physics: a collection of essays. New York: Oxford University Press.
- Kouremenos, Theokritos (2002). The proportions in Aristotle's Phys.7.5. Paligenesia, 76. Stuttgart: Franz Steiner Verlag.
- Lang, Helen S. (1992). Aristotle's Physics and its Medieval Varieties. Albany: State University of New York (SUNY). doi:10.1086/356750.
  - Andre Goddu (March 1994). "Aristotle's Physics and Its Medieval Varieties. Helen S. Lang". Isis. 85 (1): 146, 147. doi:10.1086/356750.
- —— (1998). The Order of Nature in Aristotle's Physics: Place and the Elements. Cambridge: Cambridge University Press. doi:10.1086/432288.
  - Monte Johnson (December 2004). "Helen S. Lang. The Order of Nature in Aristotle's Physics: Place and the Elements". Isis. 95 (4): 687, 688. doi:10.1086/432288.
- Lynch, John Patrick (1972). Aristotle's School: A Study of a Greek Educational Institution. Berkeley: University of California Press.
- MacMullin, Ernan; Bobik, Joseph (1965). The Concept of Matter in Greek and Medieval Philosophy. Notre Dame: University of Notre Dame Press.
- Maritain, Jacques, Science and Wisdom, trans. Bernard Wall (New York: Charles Scribner's Sons, 1954).
- Morison, Benjamin, On Location: Aristotle's Concept of Place (Oxford University Press, 2002).
- Novak, Joseph A. (2001). "Abduction and Aristotle's Library". Proceedings of the Ontario Society for the Study of Argumentation Conference. 4. University of Windsor.
- Reizler, Kurt, Physics and Reality (New Haven: Yale University Press, 1940).
- Roark, Tony (2011). Aristotle on Time: A Study of the Physics. Cambridge: Cambridge University Press.
- Solmsen, Friedrich (1958). "Aristotle and Prime Matter: A Reply to Hugh R. King". Journal of the History of Ideas. 19 (2): 243–252. doi:10.2307/2707937. JSTOR 2707937.
- —— (1960). Aristotle's System of the Physical World: A Comparison with His Predecessors. Cornell studies in classical philology, 33. Ithaca, NY: Cornell University Press.
- —— (1961a). "Aristotle's Word for Matter". In Prete, Sesto (ed.). Didascaliæ: Studies in Honor of Anselm M. Albareda Prefect of the Vatican Library. New York: Bernard M. Rosenthal. pp. 393–408. Alborado's birth name was Joaquín Albareda y Ramoneda.
- —— (1961b). "Misplaced Passages at the End of Aristotle's Physics". American Journal of Philology. 82 (3): 270–282. doi:10.2307/292369. JSTOR 292369.
- Smith, Vincent Edward, The General Science of Nature (Milwaukee: The Bruce Publishing Company, 1958).
- Smith, Vincent Edward, Philosophical Physics (New York: Harper & Brothers, 1950).
- Wardy, Robert (1990). The Chain of Change: A study of Aristotle's Physics VII. Cambridge; New York: Cambridge University Press. ISBN 9780521373272.
- Watson, Walter (2012). The Lost Second Book of Aristotle's Poetics. Chicago; London: University of Chicago Press.
- White, Michael J. (1992). The Continuous and the Discrete: Ancient Physical Theories from a Contemporary Perspective. Oxford: Clarendon Press.
- Zeller, Eduard (1897a). Aristotle and the Earlier Peripatetics; being a translation from Zeller's Philosophy of the Greeks. Vol. I. Translated by Costelloe, B.F.C.; Muirhead, J.H. London: Longmans, Green, and Co.
- —— (1897b). Aristotle and the Earlier Peripatetics; being a translation from Zeller's Philosophy of the Greeks. Vol. II. Translated by Costelloe, B.F.C.; Muirhead, J.H. London: Longmans, Green, and Co.
