= A Syntopicon =

Topic-centered compilation of the Western canon

A Syntopicon: An Index to The Great Ideas (1952; second edition, 1990) is a two-volume index, published as volumes 2 and 3 of Encyclopædia Britannica, Inc.’s collection Great Books of the Western World. Compiled by Mortimer J. Adler, an American philosopher, the volumes were billed as a collection and guide to the most important ideas, clustered under 102 "Great Ideas", of the Western canon. The term “syntopicon” as well as "Great Ideas" were coined specifically for this undertaking, the former a Neo-Latin word meaning “a collection of topics.” The volumes catalogued what Adler and his team deemed to be the fundamental ideas contained in the works of the Great Books of the Western World, which stretched chronologically from Homer to Freud. The Syntopicon lists, under each idea, where every occurrence of the concept can be located in the collection's famous works. The Syntopicon was revised as part of the second edition of the collection.

== History ==
The Syntopicon was created to set the Great Books collection apart from previously published sets (such as The Harvard Classics). Robert Hutchins, at the time, in addition to being the president of the University of Chicago, also served as chairman of the Board of Editors of the Encyclopædia Britannica. Hutchins and Adler were recruited by the encyclopedia's publisher, William Benton, for a “special idea” which would increase the collection's marketability.

With this mission, Adler undertook a project that would consume over a decade of his life: identifying and indexing the western world's Great Ideas. In the end, the Syntopicon would require over 400,000 man-hours of reading and cost over two million dollars. Britannica publisher Benton joked at the Great Books presentation dinner that “the Syntopicon is said to be the most expensive two volumes editorially in all publishing history. How Hutchins and Adler achieved that unique distinction, the publisher is still trying to figure out. [Clifton Fadiman] assured me some day the story will be told. I’d like it whenever I can get it.”

The process of cataloging each appearance of one of the “Great Ideas” in all 431 works by 71 authors in the collection was so arduous that the Syntopicon nearly did not make it to print. Before it even came time to print, the budget had topped a million dollars and there was not even “a penny for paper” left. Adler persevered, however, having spent the previous eight years of his life on the project. He single-handedly raised funds by selling more expensive “Founders Editions” of the sets, and disobeyed the order to fire his entire staff. There were times, during the process when he admitted: “the question was could we sell the plates for junk! Could we dispose of the plates as old metal?”

Adler felt, through it all, that he was creating something completely new. The Syntopicon, he felt, would be revolutionary, its release on par with such events as the creation of the first dictionary. It would do for ideas what previous reference books had done for words and facts. He worked with a team of over 100 readers who met twice a week for years to discuss the readings and the ideas within them. Among his editorial team was a young Saul Bellow.

In the end, he produced two volumes, which listed 102 Great Ideas of Western Civilization, intending them to be comprehensive of Western thought, alphabetically, from Angel to World. He realized no hierarchical scheme would command the assent of a pluralistic society where persons centered their thinking and loyalty around so many different ways at looking at things, though allowing for non-prescriptive hierarchical listings of smaller ideas within the greater ideas. The set was released with much fanfare, including an honorary gifting of the first two editions to U.S. President Harry S. Truman and Elizabeth II. An internal memo from Encyclopædia Britannica, regarding a release party, reads:

The projected sequences of events is: (1) Mr. Hutchins kicks off the conference with a discussion of the Great Books movement, and the university’s and Britannica’s interest in the set; (2) Mr. Adler tells in detail of the contents of the set and the significance of the Syntopicon; (3) Cocktails.

The second edition of Great Books of the Western World contained six additional volumes of works from the twentieth century, like James Joyce, Max Weber, etc. The second edition of the Syntopicon added, to each of the articles on the great ideas, references to the works in the additional volumes and revisions to the introduction to each great idea to include some mention of how the given idea was understood by the twentieth-century authors in the collection.

== Purpose ==
In addition to being a “special idea” that would set Great Books of the Western World apart, the Syntopicon serves four other purposes, outlined in its preface. The Syntopicon can serve as a reference book, as a book to be read, as an “instrument of liberal education,” and as “an instrument of discovery and research.”

Above all, however, the Syntopicon was created to unite the western world's canon. It was created to solve what Adler saw as a fundamental problem, that “different authors say the same thing in different ways, or use the same words to say quite different things.” By cataloging the things the great authors were saying in a more scientific manner, Adler hoped to show the underlying unity that ultimately existed in the collected works.

For Hutchins, a chief proponent of classical education, the creation of the Syntopicon held even greater implications. Hutchins felt that the ideas being discussed and cross-listed in the Syntopicon might be "powerful enough to save the world from self-destruction."

== Content ==
The Syntopicon consists of 102 chapters on the 102 Great Ideas. Each chapter is broken down into five distinct sections: the introduction, an outline of topics, references, cross-references, and additional readings. Adler penned all 102 introductions himself, giving a brief essay on the idea and its connection with the western canon. The outline of topics broke each idea down further, into as many as 15 sub-ideas. For instance, the first idea “Angel” is broken down into “Inferior deities or demi-gods in polytheistic religion,” “the philosophical consideration of pure intelligences, spiritual substances, supra-human persons” and seven other subtopics. After this is the references section (for instance, “inferior deities or demi-gods in polytheistic religion” can be found in Homer, Sophocles, Shakespeare, Milton, Bacon, Locke, Hegel, Goethe and more). Cross-references follow, where similar ideas are listed. Last is the additional readings, in which one could seek out more on the subject of “Angel.”

The 102 ideas are broken between the two volumes, as follows:

Volume I

- Angel
- Animal
- Aristocracy
- Art
- Astronomy
- Beauty
- Being
- Cause
- Chance
- Change
- Citizen
- Constitution
- Courage
- Custom and Convention
- Definition
- Democracy
- Desire
- Dialectic
- Duty
- Education
- Element
- Emotion
- Eternity
- Evolution
- Experience
- Family
- Fate
- Form
- God
- Good and Evil
- Government
- Habit
- Happiness
- History
- Honor
- Hypothesis
- Idea
- Immortality
- Induction
- Infinity
- Judgment
- Justice
- Knowledge
- Labor
- Language
- Law
- Liberty
- Life and Death
- Logic
- Love

Volume II

- Man
- Mathematics
- Matter
- Mechanics
- Medicine
- Memory and Imagination
- Metaphysics
- Mind
- Monarchy
- Nature
- Necessity and Contingency
- Oligarchy
- One and Many
- Opinion
- Opposition
- Philosophy
- Physics
- Pleasure and Pain
- Poetry
- Principle
- Progress
- Prophecy
- Prudence
- Punishment
- Quality
- Quantity
- Reasoning
- Relation
- Religion
- Revolution
- Rhetoric
- Same and Other
- Science
- Sense
- Sign and Symbol
- Sin
- Slavery
- Soul
- Space
- State
- Temperance
- Theology
- Time
- Truth
- Tyranny and Despotism
- Universal and Particular
- Virtue and Vice
- War and Peace
- Wealth
- Will
- Wisdom
- World

== Reactions ==
The release of the Syntopicon and the Great Books of the Western World was covered in the New York Herald, The New York Times, the Los Angeles Times, Time magazine, the Chicago Tribune, and local papers across the United States.

Full-page ads for Time magazine appeared in newspapers across the country, saying “What and Why is a Syntopicon?” Time published an article about the new, pivotal piece of reference material, and Adler wrote them back in thanks, saying that “I think the piece is both thoroughly accurate and very lively, which, considering the subject matter, is quite a feat.”

Look magazine ran a feature on the Syntopicon, displaying behind-the-scene photos of the index's staff at work. In one picture, editor Joe Roddy is shown weighing the number of entries about love on a scale. “Discussions of love by great authors,” the caption reads, “outweigh sin and eternity.” Life magazine featured the scholars who had worked on the Syntopicon in front of 102 card catalogue drawers.

Despite the extensive press coverage and cross-country speeches, however, sales of the Syntopicon and the Great Books of the Western World were slow. Experienced encyclopedia salesmen had to be brought in to move the product, despite Hutchins’ dislike of this solution.

The Syntopicon's list was "arbitrary", as even Adler admitted. The press and others also found problems with the Syntopicon, and despite Adler’s predictions (“we predict that, as dictionaries are indispensable in the realm of words, and encyclopaedias in the realm of facts, so the Syntopicon will become indispensable in the realm of ideas” ) the Syntopicon has fallen into relative obscurity. At the time of its release, The New York Times Book Review declared: “Its defects are on the surface. One is the implication that great books are concerned only with ideas which can be logically analyzed—whereas many masterpieces of literature live in realms partially or wholly outside the realm of logic. Another is the conception that the chief purpose of reading a book is to crack its shell and reach its kernel—the form itself being unimportant decoration.”

== Subsequent books ==
=== Six Great Ideas ===
In a succeeding book, Adler expressed his regret that the civil rights concept of Equality had not been selected. He attempted to rectify the omission with Six Great Ideas: Truth–Goodness–Beauty–Liberty–Equality–Justice (1981).

This is a much-repeated expression by Adler, so it may be worth noting that Adler would often make remarks to cater to frequently-posed questions about the Syntopicon that had popular re-publication in media outlets and possibly appeal but little bearing on the actual philosophical work or usefulness pertaining to the set to which it belonged. People, particularly ideologues, would see the list of Great Ideas as representing a kind of popularity contest of significance among ideas when the Great Ideas were actually employed to group ideas under short-as-possible names more like older and newer constellations established over the centuries are used as a convenience to group stars in the night sky, which even the most modern astronomers might use to introduce the study of the stars to novices.

Adler deliberately included what could easily be regarded as alternate "constellations" made of smaller ideas in a list accompanying the Great Ideas content within the set called "Inventory of Terms". For example, the alternate "constellation" of the important idea of political equality, which, had it been classed with a Great Idea of Equality, would have been presented with ideas of more of a mathematical quality to express the idea comprehensively and also would have included a large set of subtopics already in the set, such as:

- Liberty and equality for all under law

- Universal suffrage: the abolition of privileged classes

- The problem of economic justice: the choice between capitalism and socialism

- Justice and equality: the kinds of justice in relation to the measure and modes of equality and inequality
- Despotic and constitutional government with respect to political liberty and equality: the rights of the governed
- The character and extent of citizenship under different types of constitutions
- The qualifications for citizenship: extent of suffrage
- The organization of workmen and the formation of trade unions to protect labor's rights and interests
- The freedom of equals under government: the equality of citizenship
- Love between equals and unequals, like and unlike: the fraternity of citizenship
- The aims of political revolution: the seizure of power; the attainment of liberty, justice, equality

=== Propaedia ===
Adler attempted another index, in one volume, the Propædia for the fifteenth edition of the Encyclopædia Britannica. A traditional two-volume alphabetical index has since been produced for the more recent versions of the fifteenth edition, in addition to Propædia.

=== 1992 Edition ===
The Syntopicon was republished as The Great Ideas: a Lexicon of Western Thought (1992), a single volume reprint of the commentary on all 102 ideas without including indexing to the Great Books or cross-references to the other Great Ideas.

== See also ==
- Great Conversation
- Great books
