= Mortimer J. Adler =

American philosopher, author and educator (1902–2001)

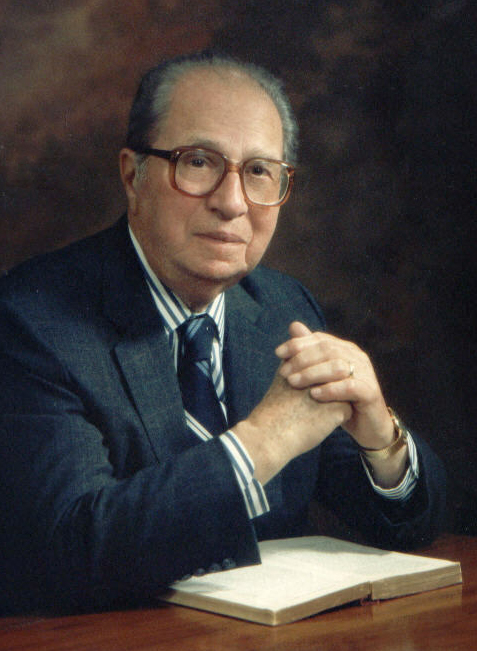
- Adler while presiding over the Center for the Study of The Great Ideas
- Born: Mortimer Jerome Adler; December 28, 1902; New York City, U.S.
- Died: June 28, 2001 (aged 98); San Mateo, California, U.S.
- Spouses: Helen Leavenworth Boynton (m. 1927; div. 1960); Caroline Sage Pring (m. 1963; died 1998)

Education
- Education: Columbia University (PhD)

Philosophical work
- Era: 20th-century philosophy
- Region: Western philosophy
- School: Aristotelianism; Thomism
- Main interests: Philosophical theology, metaphysics, ethics
- Notable works: Aristotle for Everybody, How to Read a Book, A Syntopicon

Mortimer Jerome Adler (/ˈædlər/; December 28, 1902 – June 28, 2001) was an American philosopher, educator, encyclopedist, author, and lay theologian. His philosophical work was situated within the Aristotelian and Thomistic traditions. Adler taught at Columbia University and the University of Chicago, served as chairman of the board of editors of Encyclopædia Britannica, and founded the Institute for Philosophical Research.

He resided for extended periods in New York City, Chicago, San Francisco, and San Mateo, California.

== Biography ==
=== Early life and education ===
Adler was born in Manhattan, New York City, on December 28, 1902, to Jewish immigrants from Germany: Clarissa (née Manheim), a schoolteacher, and Ignatz Adler, a jewelry salesman.

Adler left school at age 14 to work as a copy boy for The New York Sun, with the ultimate aspiration of becoming a journalist. He soon returned to education to take night classes in writing, during which he became acquainted with Western philosophy.

Adler subsequently studied at Columbia University, where he contributed to the student literary magazine The Morningside. One of his contributions was the poem Choice, published in 1922, when Charles A. Wagner was editor-in-chief and Whittaker Chambers was an associate editor. Adler refused to take a swimming test required for a bachelor's degree; Columbia awarded him an honorary degree in 1983. He remained at Columbia, where he held an instructorship and later earned a doctorate in psychology. During this period, he wrote his first book, Dialectic, published in 1927.

Adler later worked with Scott Buchanan at the People's Institute and collaborated with him for many years on their respective Great Books projects.

=== Intellectual development and philosophic evolution ===
While working in journalism and attending night classes during his adolescence, Adler encountered writings by philosophers including Plato, Aristotle, Thomas Aquinas, John Locke, John Stuart Mill. These figures became central reference points in his intellectual development. Adler's philosophical views developed toward what he described as the identification and correction of errors in contemporary philosophy, a position he articulated in his 1985 book Ten Philosophical Mistakes: Basic Errors in Modern Thought.

In this work, Adler argued that certain foundational problems in modern philosophy originated with René Descartes in continental philosophy and with Thomas Hobbes and David Hume in British philosophy. He attributed these problems to what he characterized as insufficient engagement with Aristotle by thinkers who rejected classical philosophical frameworks. Adler further contended that these errors were extended by later philosophical movements, including Kantian idealism and existentialism, as well as by utilitarian and analytic philosophy associated with figures such as John Stuart Mill, Jeremy Bentham, and Bertrand Russell. Adler maintained that his own philosophical approach addressed these issues through concepts and distinctions derived from Aristotelianism.

=== Chicago ===
In 1930, Robert Maynard Hutchins, the recently appointed president of the University of Chicago and an earlier acquaintance of Adler, arranged for Adler to be hired by the University of Chicago Law School as a professor of the philosophy of law. Members of the University of Chicago philosophy faculty, including James Hayden Tufts, Edwin Arthur Burtt, and George Herbert Mead, expressed "grave doubts" about Adler's qualifications in philosophy and opposed his appointment to the university's Department of Philosophy. Adler became the first individual without a formal legal background to join the law school faculty.

Following the success of a Great Books seminar that influenced University of Chicago trustee and businessman Walter Paepcke, Paepcke founded the Aspen Institute. Adler subsequently taught philosophy to business executives at the institute.

=== Popular appeal ===
Adler sought to present philosophy to a general audience, and several of his works, including How to Read a Book, achieved wide circulation. He also supported the concept of economic democracy and wrote the preface to Louis O. Kelso's 1958 book The Capitalist Manifesto. Adler frequently collaborated with Arthur Rubin, a longtime associate from his undergraduate years at Columbia University, who assisted him in his research and writing.

In Adler's own words:

Unlike many of my contemporaries, I never write books for my fellow professors to read. I have no interest in the academic audience at all. I'm interested in Joe Doakes. A general audience can read any book I write – and they do.

Dwight Macdonald once criticized Adler's literary style by saying "Mr. Adler once wrote a book called How to Read a Book. He should now read a book called How to Write a Book."

== Encyclopedia and educational reform ==
Adler and Robert Hutchins jointly founded the Great Books of the Western World program and the Great Books Foundation. In 1952, Adler established the Institute for Philosophical Research and served as its director. He served on the Board of Editors of Encyclopædia Britannica, where he compiled A Syntopicon and later the Propaedia. Adler succeeded Hutchins as chairman of the Board of Editors in 1974.

As director of editorial planning for the fifteenth edition of Encyclopædia Britannica, beginning in 1965, Adler played a central role in the reorganization of the encyclopedia's structure and presentation of knowledge. He also developed the Paideia Proposal, which led to the creation of the Paideia Program, a school curriculum focused on guided reading and discussion of selected texts at each grade level. In 1990, Adler and Max Weismann founded the Center for the Study of the Great Ideas in Chicago.

=== Great books of the Western canon ===
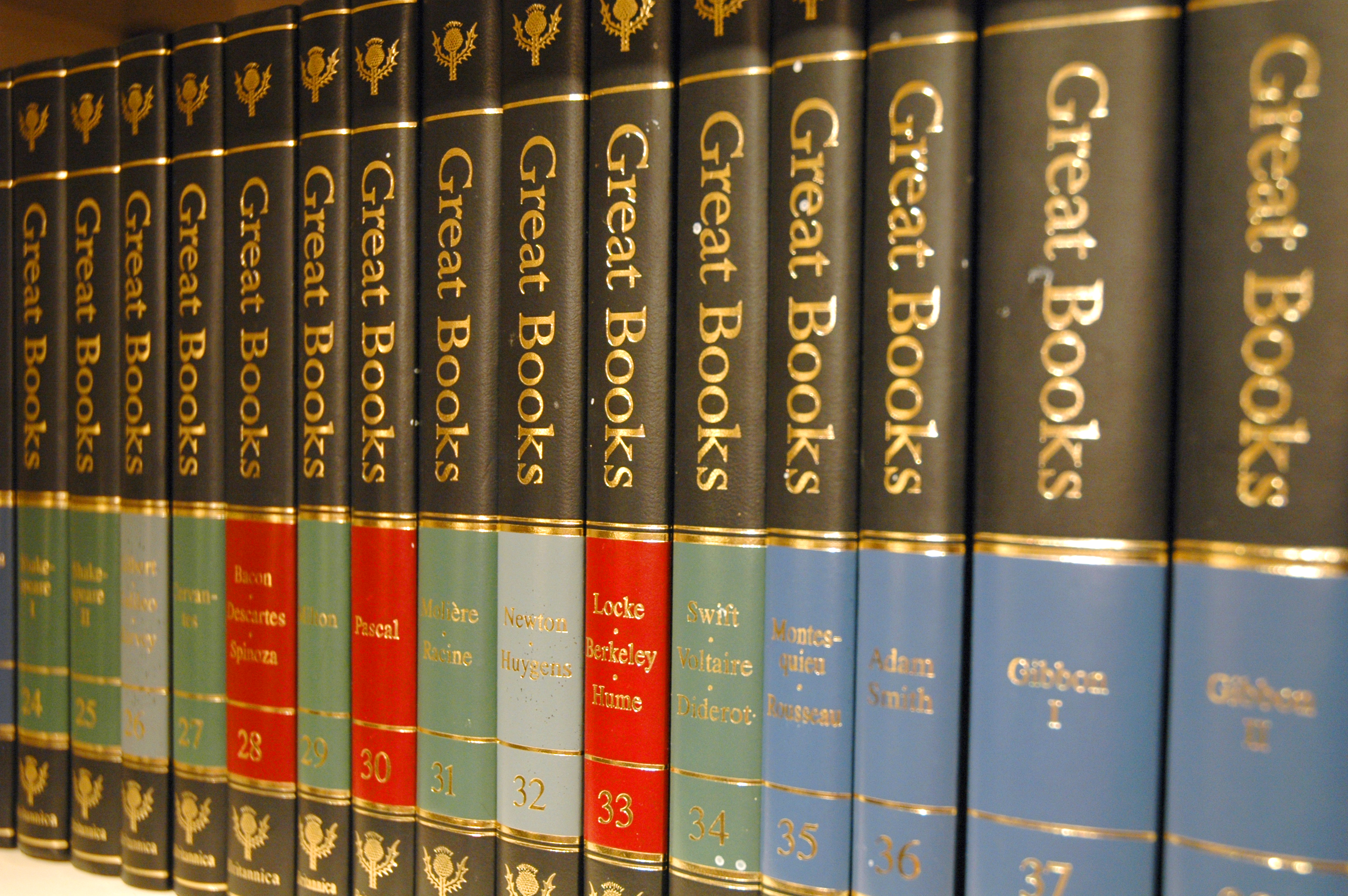
The Great Books (second edition)

Great Books of the Western World is a series of books originally published in the United States in 1952, by Encyclopædia Britannica, Inc., to present the great books in 54 volumes. A second edition was published in 1990, in 60 volumes. Some translations were updated, some works were removed, and there were additions from the 20th century, in six new volumes.

The original editors had three criteria for including a book in the series drawn from Western civilization: the book must be relevant to contemporary matters, and not only important in its historical context; it must be rewarding to re-read repeatedly with respect to liberal education; and it must be a part of "the great conversation about the great ideas", relevant to at least 25 of the 102 "Great Ideas" as identified by the editor of the series's comprehensive index, the Syntopicon, to which they belonged. The books were chosen not on the basis of ethnic and cultural inclusiveness (historical influence being seen as sufficient for inclusion), nor on whether the editors agreed with the authors' views.

== Religion and theology ==
Adler was born into a secular Jewish family. In his early twenties, he became interested in the work of Thomas Aquinas, particularly the Summa Theologica. He later wrote that its intellectual rigor and clarity led him to rank theology among his principal philosophical interests. Adler became strongly associated with Thomism and frequently contributed to Catholic philosophical and educational journals, as well as lecturing at Catholic institutions. As a result, he was sometimes assumed to be a Catholic convert, though this was not the case at the time.

In 1940, James T. Farrell described Adler as "the leading American fellow-traveller of the Roman Catholic Church", comparing his views to those of prominent Catholic philosophers such as Étienne Gilson, Jacques Maritain, and Martin D'Arcy. Adler also admired Henri Bergson.

Despite his affinity, Adler delayed formal conversion to Catholicism. Farrell attributed Adler's delay in joining the Church to his being among those Christians who "wanted their cake and ... wanted to eat it too" and compared him to the Emperor Constantine, who waited until he was on his deathbed to formally become a Catholic. Adler continued to reflect on theological questions for several decades and described himself in 1980, in How to Think About God: A Guide for the Twentieth-Century Pagan, as identifying with the "pagan" referenced in the subtitle.

In a 1980 interview conducted by Ken Myers, Adler stated that moral rather than intellectual considerations had prevented his conversion to Christianity. Myers noted that Adler was baptized as an Episcopalian in 1984. Offering insight into Adler's conversion, Myers quotes him from a subsequent 1990 article in Christianity magazine: "My chief reason for choosing Christianity was because the mysteries were incomprehensible. What's the point of revelation if we could figure it out ourselves? If it were wholly comprehensible, then it would just be another philosophy."

According to his friend Deal Hudson, Adler "had been attracted to Catholicism for many years" and "wanted to be a Roman Catholic, but issues like abortion and the resistance of his family and friends" kept him away. Many thought he was baptized as an Episcopalian rather than a Catholic solely because of his "wonderful – and ardently Episcopal – wife" Caroline. Hudson suggests it is no coincidence that it was only after her death in 1998 that he took the final step. In December 1999, in San Mateo, where he had moved to spend his last years, Adler was formally received into the Catholic Church by a long-time friend and admirer, Bishop Pierre DuMaine. "Finally," wrote another friend, Ralph McInerny, "he became the Roman Catholic he had been training to be all his life".

Despite not being a Catholic for most of his life, on account of his lifelong participation in the Neo-Thomist movement and his almost equally long membership in the American Catholic Philosophical Association, this latter, according to McInerny is willing to consider Adler "a Catholic philosopher".

== Philosophy ==
Adler referred to Aristotle's Nicomachean Ethics as the "ethics of common sense" and also as "the only moral philosophy that is sound, practical, and undogmatic." Thus, it is the only ethical doctrine that answers all the questions that moral philosophy should and can attempt to answer, neither more nor less, and that has answers that are true by the standard of truth that is appropriate and applicable to normative judgments. In contrast, Adler believed that other theories or doctrines try to answer more questions than they can or fewer than they should, and their answers are mixtures of truth and error, particularly the moral philosophy of Immanuel Kant.

Adler was a self-proclaimed "moderate dualist" and viewed the positions of psychophysical dualism and materialistic monism to be opposite sides of two extremes. Regarding dualism, he dismissed the extreme form of dualism that stemmed from such philosophers as Plato (body and soul) and Descartes (mind and matter), as well as the theory of extreme monism and the mind–brain identity theory. After eliminating the extremes, Adler subscribed to a more moderate form of dualism. He believed that the brain is only a necessary, but not a sufficient, condition for conceptual thought; that an "immaterial intellect" is also requisite as a condition; and that the difference between human and animal behavior is a radical difference in kind. Adler defended this position against many challenges to dualistic theories.

=== Freedom and free will ===
The meanings of "freedom" and "free will" have been and are under debate, and the debate is confused because there is no generally accepted definition of either term. Adler's "Institute for Philosophical Research" spent ten years studying the "idea of freedom" as the word was used by hundreds of authors who have discussed and disputed freedom. The study was published in 1958 as Volume One of The Idea of Freedom, subtitled A Dialectical Examination of the Idea of Freedom with subsequent comments in Adler's Philosophical Dictionary. Adler's study concluded that a delineation of three kinds of freedom – circumstantial, natural, and acquired – is necessary for clarity on the subject.

1. "Circumstantial freedom" denotes "freedom from coercion or restraint."
2. "Natural freedom" denotes "freedom of a free will" or "free choice." It is the freedom to determine one's own decisions or plans. This freedom exists in everyone inherently, regardless of circumstances or state of mind.
3. "Acquired freedom" is the freedom "to will as we ought to will" and, thus, "to live as [one] ought to live." This freedom is not inherent: it must be acquired by a change whereby a person gains qualities as "good, wise, virtuous, etc."

=== Religion ===
As Adler's interest in religion and theology increased, he made references to the Bible and the need to test articles of faith for compatibility with the conclusions of the science of nature and of philosophers. In his 1981 book How to Think About God, Adler attempts to demonstrate God as the exnihilator (the creator of something from nothing). Adler stressed that even with this conclusion, God's existence cannot be proven or demonstrated, but only established as true beyond a reasonable doubt. However, in a recent re-review of the argument, John Cramer concluded that recent developments in cosmology appear to converge with and support Adler's argument, and that in light of such theories as the multiverse, the argument is no worse for wear and may, indeed, now be judged somewhat more probable than it was originally.

Adler believed that, if theology and religion are living things, there is nothing intrinsically wrong about efforts to modernize them. They must be open to change and growth like everything else. Furthermore, there is no reason to be surprised when discussions such as those about the "death of God" – a concept drawn from Friedrich Nietzsche – stir popular excitement as they did in the recent past and could do so again today. According to Adler, of all the great ideas, the idea of God has always been and continues to be the one that evokes the greatest concern among the widest group of men and women. However, he was opposed to the idea of converting atheism into a new form of religion or theology.

=== World politics ===
In his 1944 book How To Think About War And Peace, Adler argues that the presence of multiple sovereign states makes war inevitable and that only under world government would there be perpetual peace.

== Personal life ==
Mortimer Adler was married twice and had four children. He married Helen Boynton in 1927. Together they adopted two children, Mark and Michael, in 1938 and 1940, respectively. They divorced in 1960. In 1963, Adler married Caroline Pring, his junior by thirty-four years; they had two children, Douglas and Philip.

== Awards ==
- 1985, Golden Plate Award of the American Academy of Achievement
- 1993, Aspen Hall of Fame

== Published works ==
- Dialectic (1927)
- The Nature of Judicial Proof: An Inquiry into the Logical, Legal, and Empirical Aspects of the Law of Evidence (1931, with Jerome Michael)
- Diagrammatics (1932, with Maude Phelps Hutchins)
- Crime, Law and Social Science (1933, with Jerome Michael)
- Art and Prudence: A Study in Practical Philosophy (1937)
- What Man Has Made of Man: A Study of the Consequences of Platonism and Positivism in Psychology (1937)
- St. Thomas and the Gentiles (1938)
- The Philosophy and Science of Man: A Collection of Texts as a Foundation for Ethics and Politics (1940)
- How to Read a Book: The Art of Getting a Liberal Education (1940), 1966 edition subtitled A Guide to Reading the Great Books, 1972 revised edition with Charles Van Doren, The Classic Guide to Intelligent Reading: ISBN 0-671-21209-5
- Problems for Thomists: The Problem of Species (1940)
- A Dialectic of Morals: Towards the Foundations of Political Philosophy (1941)
- "How to Mark a Book". The Saturday Review of Literature. July 6, 1940.
- How to Think About War and Peace (1944)
- The Revolution in Education (1944, with Milton Mayer)
- Adler, Mortimer J. (1947). Heywood, Robert B. (ed.). The Works of the Mind: The Philosopher. Chicago: University of Chicago Press. OCLC 752682744.
- Adler, Mortimer J. (1958), The Idea of Freedom: A Dialectical Examination of the Idea of Freedom, vol. 1, Doubleday.
- The Capitalist Manifesto (1958, with Louis O. Kelso) ISBN 0-8371-8210-7
- The New Capitalists: A Proposal to Free Economic Growth from the Slavery of Savings (1961, with Louis O. Kelso)
- The Idea of Freedom: A Dialectical Examination of the Controversies about Freedom (1961)
- Great Ideas from the Great Books (1961)
- The Conditions of Philosophy: Its Checkered Past, Its Present Disorder, and Its Future Promise (1965)
- The Difference of Man and the Difference It Makes (1967)
- The Time of Our Lives: The Ethics of Common Sense (1970)
- The Common Sense of Politics (1971)
- The American Testament (1975, with William Gorman)
- Some Questions About Language: A Theory of Human Discourse and Its Objects (1976)
- Philosopher at Large: An Intellectual Autobiography (1977)
- Reforming Education: The Schooling of a People and Their Education Beyond Schooling (1977, edited by Geraldine Van Doren)
- Aristotle for Everybody: Difficult Thought Made Easy (1978) ISBN 0-684-83823-0
- How to Think About God: A Guide for the 20th-Century Pagan (1980) ISBN 0-02-016022-4
- Six Great Ideas: Truth–Goodness–Beauty–Liberty–Equality–Justice (1981) ISBN 0-02-072020-3
- The Angels and Us (1982)
- The Paideia Proposal: An Educational Manifesto (1982) ISBN 0-684-84188-6
- How to Speak / How to Listen (1983) ISBN 0-02-500570-7
- Paideia Problems and Possibilities: A Consideration of Questions Raised by The Paideia Proposal (1983)
- A Vision of the Future: Twelve Ideas for a Better Life and a Better Society (1984) ISBN 0-02-500280-5
- The Paideia Program: An Educational Syllabus (1984, with Members of the Paideia Group) ISBN 0-02-013040-6
- Ten Philosophical Mistakes: Basic Errors In Modern Thought – How they came about, their consequences, and how to avoid them. (1985) ISBN 0-02-500330-5
- A Guidebook to Learning: For a Lifelong Pursuit of Wisdom (1986)
- We Hold These Truths: Understanding the Ideas and Ideals of the Constitution (1987). ISBN 0-02-500370-4
- Reforming Education: The Opening of the American Mind (1988, edited by Geraldine Van Doren)
- Intellect: Mind Over Matter (1990)
- Truth in Religion: The Plurality of Religions and the Unity of Truth (1990) ISBN 0-02-064140-0
- Haves Without Have-Nots: Essays for the 21st Century on Democracy and Socialism (1991) ISBN 0-02-500561-8
- Desires, Right & Wrong: The Ethics of Enough (1991)
- A Second Look in the Rearview Mirror: Further Autobiographical Reflections of a Philosopher At Large (1992)
- The Great Ideas: A Lexicon of Western Thought (1992)
- Natural Theology, Chance, and God (The Great Ideas Today, 1992)
- Adler, Mortimer J. (1993). The Four Dimensions of Philosophy: Metaphysical, Moral, Objective, Categorical. Macmillan. ISBN 0-02-500574-X.
- Art, the Arts, and the Great Ideas (1994)
- Philosophical Dictionary: 125 Key Terms for the Philosopher's Lexicon, Touchstone, 1995.
- How to Think About The Great Ideas (2000) ISBN 0-8126-9412-0
- How to Prove There Is a God (2011) ISBN 978-0-8126-9689-9

=== Anthologies, collections and surveys edited by Adler ===
- Scholasticism and Politics (1940)
- Great Books of the Western World (1952, 52 volumes), 2nd edition 1990, 60 volumes
  - Annual supplement: The Great Ideas Today (1961–77, 17 volumes; 1978–99, 21 volumes), with Robert Hutchins
- A Syntopicon: An Index to The Great Ideas (1952, 2 volumes), 2nd edition 1990
- The Great Ideas Program (1959–1963, 10 volumes), with Peter Wolff, Seymour Cain, and V.J. McGill
- The Negro in American History (1969, 3 volumes), with Charles Van Doren
- Gateway to the Great Books (1963, 10 volumes), with Robert Hutchins
- The Annals of America (1968, 21 volumes)
- Propædia: Outline of Knowledge and Guide to The New Encyclopædia Britannica 15th Edition (1974, 30 volumes)
- Great Treasury of Western Thought (1977, with Charles Van Doren) ISBN 0412449900
- The Library of American Civilization [microfiche collection], published by Library Resources Inc, a subsidiary of Encyclopædia Britannica Inc.

== See also ==
- List of American philosophers
- Educational perennialism
