= Charles Glenn Wallis =

American poet (1914–1944)

Charles Glenn Wallis (1914–1944) was an American poet and English translator of French, Classical Greek and Latin.

He graduated in 1936 with a BA from the University of Virginia. During 1936-37 he was a member of the Committee on Liberal Education at the University of Chicago. From July 1937 until 1942, he was a tutor and editor at St. John's College in Maryland. During those years in his twenties, he was the first person to translate numerous difficult late medieval and early modern texts into English from Latin, including Copernicus' On The Revolutions of the Heavenly Spheres, Kepler's Epitome of Copernican Astronomy, and Harmonies of the World, as well as the 12th-13th century English Philosopher Robert Grosseteste's On Light. One of his stories, "The Return", was published posthumously in Nicholas Moore and Douglas Newton's Atlantic Anthology (1945). Like a number of his poems, it is homoerotic in content.

His parents were Benjamin Hayward Wallis and Eleanor Sewell Glenn. He was eight months old when his father died on Jan 4, 1915. Charles Glenn himself died at St. Vincent's Hospital in New York City on May 4, 1944, on or near his 30th birthday from injuries suffered in an accidental fall.
