= Great Conversation =

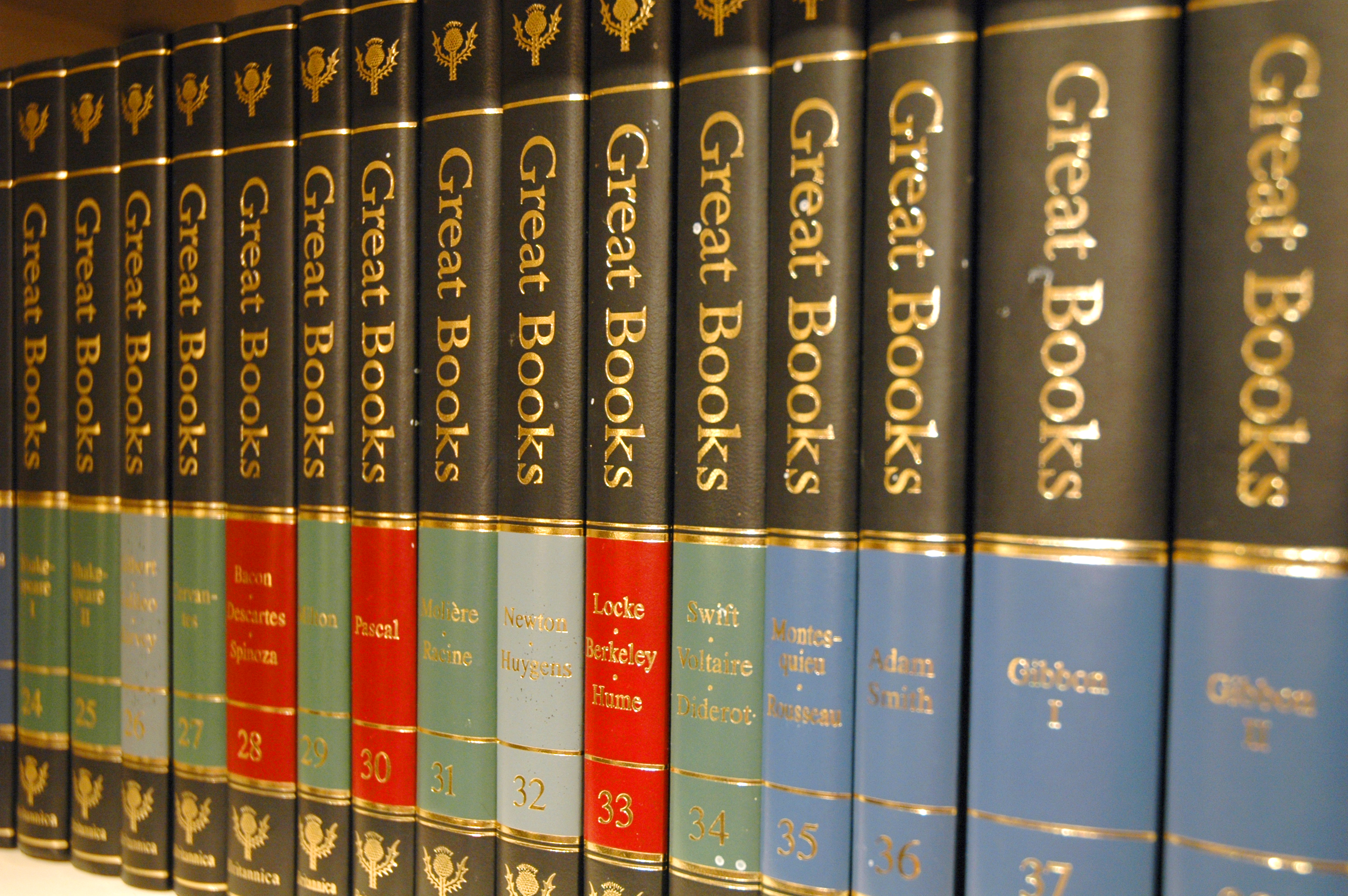
- The Great Books of the Western World (2nd edition, 1990)
- Field: Liberal Education
- Key People: Robert Maynard Hutchins; Mortimer J. Adler
- Purpose: Liberal education through reading and discussing great books

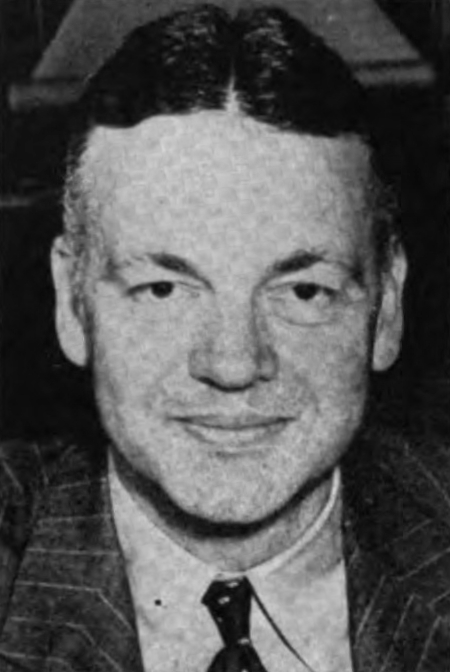
Robert M. Hutchins in 1954

The Great Conversation is an ongoing dialogue about fundamental questions. This is a dialogue that engages writers and active readers with the great books of the various fields represented in the Western canon, thus allowing perspectives separated by centuries to come together. In this exchange, readers contrast arguments and develop their own judgements. Robert M. Hutchins, one of the chief proponents of the Great Conversation as an education concept, envisioned this shared inquiry across disciplines as supporting the advancement of a lifelong liberal education, democratic citizenship, freedom, and the hope for a global community. Hutchins characterized this Western tradition through dialogue, inquiry, and Logos.

== Origins: John Erskine’s educational experiments ==
While it is not clear who coined the phrase “the great conversation,” it is clear whose pedagogy inspired the concept’s development.

=== Literary communities at Columbia ===
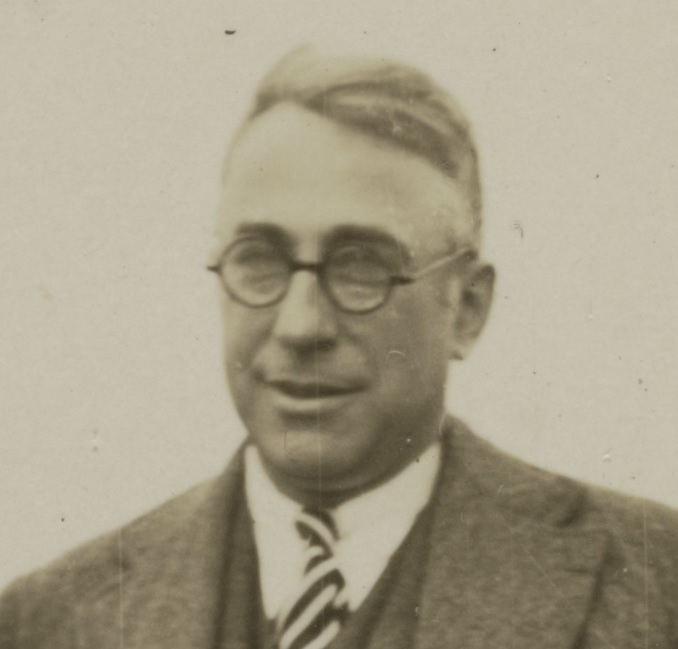
John Erskine, photographed between 1930 and 1940

John Erskine, in his later years, would declare, “How much of my education I owe to the Tavern!” He was referring to the College Tavern at Columbia College. It was at that tavern, in his junior year, that the King’s Crown literary circle would regularly meet over beer and pretzels. The circle would hold informal discussions led by George E. Woodberry and A. V. Williams Jackson. These conversations involved teachers and visiting writers discussing books of interest. This was the education Erskine gained at the tavern: a community created through shared reading.

It is this kind of education and community that he offered another generation when he established the Boar’s Head literary club not long after he returned to Columbia in 1909. This time, Erskine was the instructor.

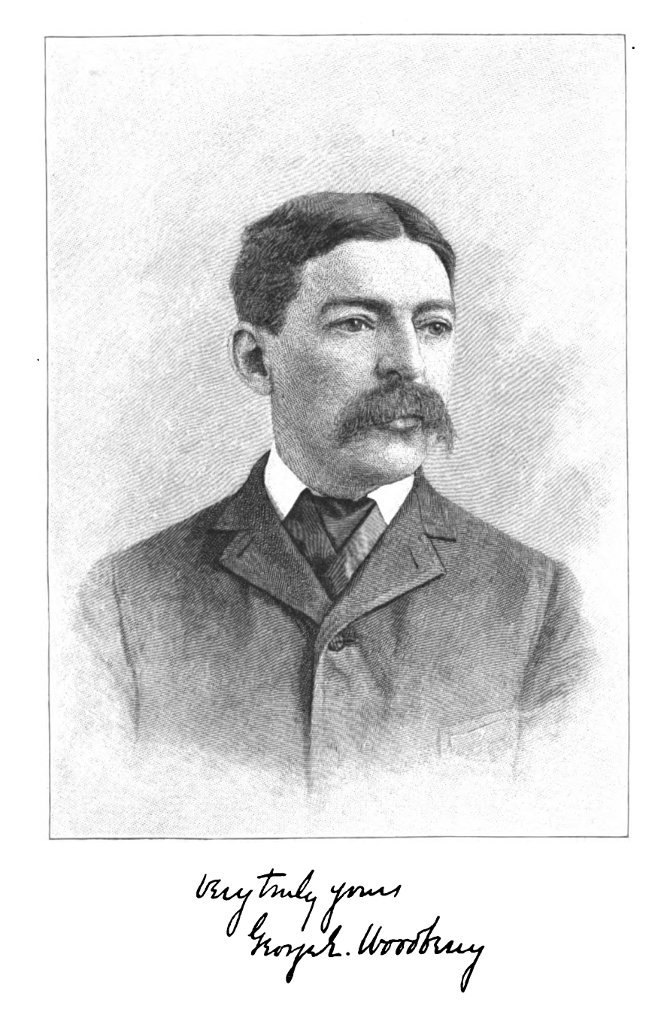
George E. Woodberry, American poet and literary critic

=== Curriculum reform ===
As Erskine participated in the King’s Crown and then the Boar’s Head, American tertiary education was undergoing a transformation. Inspired by the rise of Lernfreiheit in German research universities, American university curricula shifted more and more units away from the general curriculum and allocated them to specialized electives. Erskine was concerned that this trend would erode students’ and alumni’s shared familiarity with books. In the faculty-room, Erskine’s older colleagues complained that undergraduates scarcely knew of Homer, Virgil, Dante, or the Bible. In the spring of 1916, Erskine would submit a proposal for four two-year courses each covering literature, history, philosophy, or science. Under the proposal, students would be required to take three of the four. A critical faculty member protested to Dean Frederick P. Keppel that “to instruct the student in Dante, Aristo [sic] Rabelais, Tasso, Cervantes, Shakspere [sic], Calderon and Corneille in a single half-year” on top of everything else a student must juggle is simply far too ambitious. Keppel, for his part, recalled his studies under Woodberry and wondered if Erskine might be right. Looking back on the deliberations and his proposal, Erskine recalled, “I wanted the boys to read great books, the best sellers of ancient times, as spontaneously and humanly as they would read current best sellers, and having read the books, I wanted them to form their opinions at once in a free-for-all discussion.” In February of 1917, his proposal is adopted. In April, America joined the Great War.

=== Educational work in France ===
In the fall of 1917, a YMCA representative approached Erskine about efforts to provide continuing education for American soldiers stationed in France. The goal would be to remediate for interrupted education as well as to prepare soldiers for their return to civilian life after the war.

Erskine began as a lecturer in YMCA camps near Paris. In August, he joined the Army Educational Commission. On the Commission, Erskine’s responsibility was higher academic and professional education. It was in this capacity that Erskine found himself working alongside the American Library Association (ALA). The ALA was allowing soldiers to borrow book by post. According to the ALA, soldiers were enthusiastically borrowing books, but their requests were not for fiction. Soldiers wanted books on mathematics, law, and history. Erskine notes, “If the A. L. A. is to play its proper part in our educational program now and during demobilization, the people who donate books should give us textbooks of recent edition and reference books on all the more obvious subjects.”

On November 11, 1918, the armistice took effect and fighting on the Western Front came to a close.

Reading room at Beaune

In January of 1919, he was helping plan the Army University that would eventually be located in Beaune. Classes in Beaune began in March. At Beaune, over a hundred soldiers requested law instruction. Erskine did not expect to find himself organizing a law school. Captain Warren Abner Seavey discovered some law textbooks among the men. Copies were made. Teachers were recruited. Within a week they had a functioning law school.

=== Return to Columbia and General Honors ===
In July, he was sailing home. In his memoir, Erskine would reflect on his return saying, “I was more eager than ever to be a teacher and a writer. At Beaune I had envied the teachers who could meet the men daily in the classroom while I sat in my office and saw to it that they had a classroom, with students in it.”

Erskine's thinking would take concrete form in the Fall of 1920, at the inaugural meeting of his General Honors course. On that day, the class gathered to discuss Homer's Iliad. Every week for a year, that class would convene to hold a dialogue about written works drawn from across literature, history, philosophy, economics, and science. The following year, in 1921, the course was expanded into a two-year program just as Erskine had originally envisioned it. In the fall of 1921, Mortimer J. Adler joined Erskine’s General Honors class.

== One Name, Two Volumes ==
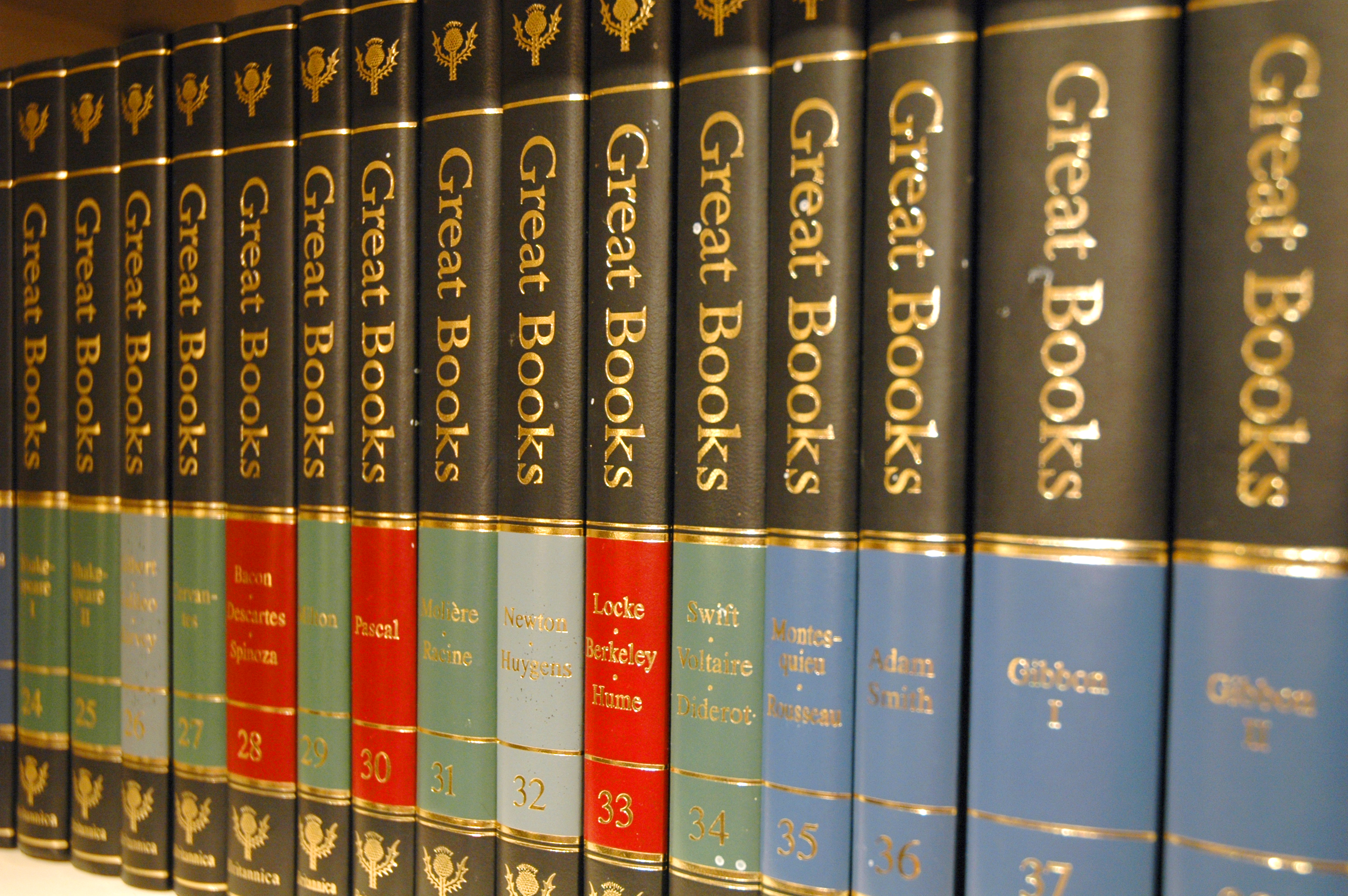
The Great Books of the Western World (2nd edition, 1990) in 60 volumes

The concept was used in publicity for the Great Books of the Western World published by Encyclopædia Britannica Inc. in 1952. It is also the title of (i) the first volume of the first edition of this set of books, written by the educational theorist Robert Maynard Hutchins and (ii) an accessory volume to the second edition (1990), written by the philosopher Mortimer J. Adler.

Spine of The Great Conversation from Great Books of the Western World

According to Hutchins, "The tradition of the West is embodied in the Great Conversation that began in the dawn of history and that continues to the present day". Adler said,

What binds the authors together in an intellectual community is the great conversation in which they are engaged. In the works that come later in the sequence of years, we find authors listening to what their predecessors have had to say about this idea or that, this topic or that. They not only harken to the thought of their predecessors, they also respond to it by commenting on it in a variety of ways.

== See also ==
- Liberal Education
- Standing on the shoulders of giants
- Translatio studii
