= Introduction to Metaphysics (essay) =

1903 essay about the concept of reality by Henri Bergson

"Introduction to Metaphysics" (French: "Introduction à la Métaphysique") is a 1903 essay about the concept of reality by Henri Bergson. For Bergson, reality occurs not in a series of discrete states but as a process similar to that described by process philosophy or the Greek philosopher Heraclitus. Reality is fluid and cannot be completely understood through reductionistic analysis, which he said "implies that we go around an object", gaining knowledge from various perspectives which are relative. Instead, reality can be grasped absolutely only through intuition, which Bergson expressed as "entering into" the object.

== Editions ==
- Henri Bergson. An Introduction to Metaphysics. Translated by T. E. Hulme. New York and London: G. P. Putnam's Sons, 1912.
- Henri Bergson. The introduction to a new philosophy; introduction à la métaphysique. Translated by Sidney Littman. Boston: J. .W. Luce, 1912.
- Henri Bergson. An Introduction to Metaphysics. Translated by T. E. Hulme. Introduced by Thomas A. Goudge. New York: Liberal Arts Press, 1949.
- Henri Bergson. An Introduction to Metaphysics. Translated by T. E. Hulme. Introduced by Thomas A. Goudge. Indianapolis and Cambridge: Hackett Publishing Company 1999: ISBN 978-0-87220-474-4

The essay is also contained in the following collections:
- The Creative Mind: An Introduction to Metaphysics 1923. Citadel Press 1992: ISBN 0-8065-0421-8
- The Creative Mind: An Introduction to Metaphysics 1923. Dover Publications 2007: ISBN 0-486-45439-8
