= Hans Maeder =

Hans Karl Maeder (December 29, 1909 – September 8, 1988) was an innovative educator who founded the Stockbridge School in Stockbridge, Massachusetts and served as its director and headmaster for 23 years.

== Early life and career ==
Maeder was born in Hamburg, Germany, on December 29, 1909, the third child in a prosperous family. He described his father as an authoritarian nationalist and anti-Semite who embraced Hitler's message. Maeder left home at 18, refusing to go into business as his father had wished, and deciding instead to become a teacher.

Maeder, a socialist consistent with the ideas of the Internationaler Sozialistischer Kampfbund had to leave the university of Hamburg due to his political attitude. In June 1933 he was warned that his arrest was imminent, and therefore he fled to Denmark. Here he taught at the Udlose Boys Home, an institution for boys with problems. He was engaged in a political committee named to Giacomo Matteotti and was in close contact to Walter Hösterey (also known as Walter Hammer), a German publicist who agitated against the Nazis and lived in Danish exile.

In autumn 1937 he had to leave Denmark and went over France to Switzerland. Here he was expelled again and had to leave after a short time. From her, he subsequently traveled to Kenya. He worked on a coffee plantation and a school program for the children of the black farmworkers. When the farmer noticed these activities, Maeder was fired. Later on he published an article about the exploitation on the plantations and this was the reason to leave Kenya. He had much luck, because the American consul in Nairobi was the father of a school friend of Maeder at his time in Hamburg. By this coincidence, Maeder got a visa for Manila without an affidavit. He now travelled to Hong Kong, Singapore, and at last to the Philippines. After some times he got an invitation to teach at the University of Hawaii and with the help of American friends he finally got a visa for Hawaii. Maeder arrived in Hawaii in 1941, but was interned as an enemy alien on December 8, the day after the bombing of Pearl Harbor.

Maeder was released from an internment camp in Texas on February 23, 1943. Arriving in New York, Maeder soon obtained a position as the director of the boys' division of a YMCA in Williamsburg, Brooklyn. In September 1944, Maeder took a teaching job for a year at Windsor Mountain School in Lenox, Massachusetts, several miles from the site of the future Stockbridge School.

Maeder then moved to the Walden School, a private day school in Manhattan, teaching German and the history of languages and briefly serving as the school's director in 1947 and 1948. It was at Walden that he met his wife Ruth, a widow at the time, through her son David, a Walden student whom he later adopted. Maeder left Walden in 1948 to found Stockbridge School.

== Stockbridge School ==
The Maeders paid $60,000 to acquire the 1,100-plus acres of the former estate of Daniel Rhodes Hanna, son of Mark Hanna. Their purchase of what became the site of Stockbridge School occurred shortly after the failure of Liberal Arts, Inc. to establish a Great Books-based college associated with St. John's College, Annapolis, Maryland, on the same site. The property had been vacant since the Great Depression and extended from the summit of West Stockbridge Mountain to the shore of a lake called the Stockbridge Bowl. Only a portion of this extensive property became the school campus, with the Maeders retaining title to the remainder.

As a progressive private boarding school for adolescents, Maeder intended that Stockbridge School's educational philosophy be interracial, nondenominational and international. The school was notable for being completely racially integrated from its inception, and Maeder made successful efforts to recruit an international student body.

To help express Maeder's philosophy, and in light of his experiences as a German refugee and expatriate, the school flew the United Nations flag just below the American flag beginning in 1948, three years after the U.N. came into existence. For some years, its curriculum included a junior year abroad, and Stockbridge briefly operated a branch in Corcelles, Switzerland.

The best-known Stockbridge School alumnus is Arlo Guthrie, whose arrest for littering by Stockbridge police shortly after graduation in 1965 inspired the song "Alice's Restaurant". Alice Brock had been the school librarian before opening a lunch counter in Stockbridge. Among other notable alumni are Chevy Chase, Benjamin Barber, Dr. Kenneth Edelin and Gunter Nabel.

== Final years ==
Maeder retired from Stockbridge School in 1971. The school closed five years later, in 1976, as a result of declining enrollment and debt. In 1978 the school campus became the site of the DeSisto at Stockbridge School, a wholly unrelated institution.

After leaving Stockbridge, Maeder worked as an educational consultant in New York City. His wife, Ruth, died in 1976. He died in Manhattan in 1988; the cause of his death was prostate cancer.
