= Edelin =

Edelin is a surname. Notable people with the surname include:

- Benjamin Edelin (born 1993), French track cyclist
- Kenneth C. Edelin (1939–2013), American physician
- Kenton Edelin (born 1962), American basketball player
- Ramona Edelin (born 1945), American academic, activist, and consultant

== See also ==
- Edelin (abbot)
