= Garey =

Garey may refer to:

First name

- Garey Bies, a Republican Party member of the Wisconsin State Assembly
- Garey Bridges, a British actor
- Garey Forster, US radio host and politician
- Garey Ingram, baseball player
- Garey Mathurin, West Indian cricketer

Surname

- Alva Garey, Wisconsin, USA, soldier, politician
- Enoch Barton Garey, Maryland, USA, soldier, policeman, and writer
- Jason Garey, an American soccer player
- Michael Garey, a computer science researcher and author

Places

- Garey, California, a small town in the United States
- The Garey, a small rural request stop on the northern section of the Manx Electric Railway on the Isle of Man
