= Windsor Mountain School =

Coordinates: 42°21′19″N 73°17′27″W

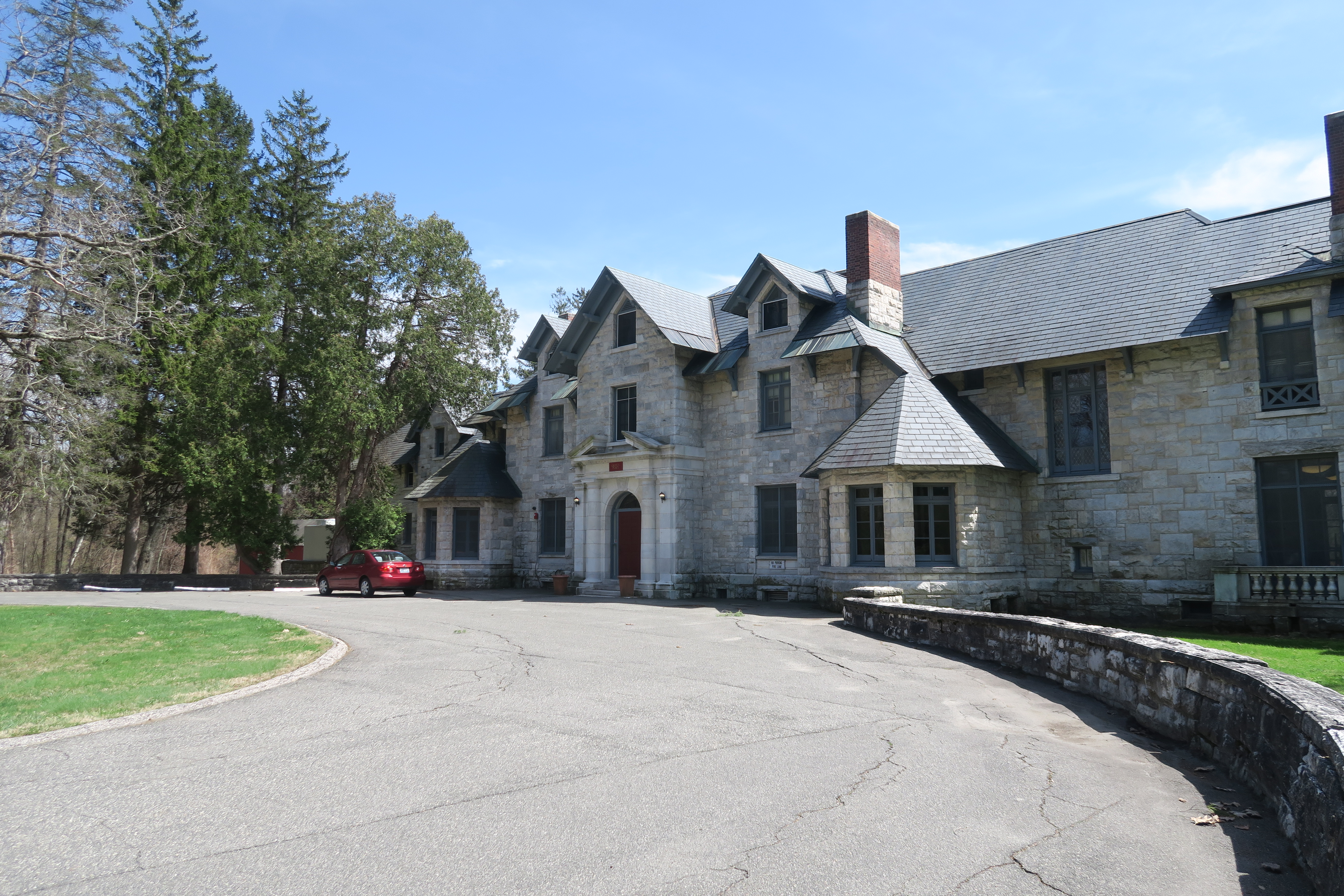
- Boston University Tanglewood Institute
- Lenox, Massachusetts

Information
- Type: private secondary school
- Established: 1944
- Closed: 1975
- Headmaster: Max Bondy (1944-1951), Heinz Bondy (1951-1975)
- Grades: 9-12
- Enrollment: 250

The Windsor Mountain School was a private, co-ed boarding school for grades 9 through 12 located in Lenox, Massachusetts.

== History ==
The school was established in Lenox in 1944 by German Jewish educational reformer Max Bondy and his wife Gertrud Bondy. The Bondys had earlier established an international school in Germany, initially in Gandersheim and later in Marienau. When the rise of Nazism threatened their enterprise, they left Germany, re-establishing their school in Switzerland in 1937. In 1939, they moved to the United States, reopening their school in Windsor, Vermont, and then later in Manchester, Vermont, at the site of the Wilburton Inn, before moving it to Massachusetts. Shortly after art collector Grenville Lindall Winthrop's death in 1943, they purchased Groton Place, his Carrère and Hastings-designed mansion in Lenox and opened their new school.

In 1951, after Max Bondy's death, his son Heinz succeeded him as headmaster. Heinz Bondy led the school for 25 years until it closed in 1975.

Operated according to progressive education principles, the school was unusually democratic in its governance, with a student government that was empowered to make all nonacademic rules. As of 1970, there was no dress code, student publications were not censored, and there were no restrictions on student political activities. The school's philosophy held that the exercise of freedom would help students become responsible, self-directing people.

Among the prominent Americans who sent their children to Windsor Mountain School in the 1960s were musicians Harry Belafonte, Thelonious Monk, and Randy Weston, civil rights lawyer Clifford Durr and his wife, activist Virginia Foster Durr. and Judge George W. Crockett Jr.

As of 1970, Windsor Mountain had about 250 students, including about 40 African Americans.

Educator Hans Maeder, who was later to establish and lead the Stockbridge School, taught at Windsor Mountain School for a year in the 1940s. Poet Gerald Hausman taught at Windsor Mountain School from 1969 to 1976.

Eric "Rick" Goeld, who attended Windsor Mountain from 1961 to 1963, recently published "People of Windsor Mountain," which is a history of the school spanning the years 1920 to 1975. The book includes many remembrances and personal stories of alumni and former faculty.

There is also another recently published book By Roselle Kline Chartock, a retired professor of education from nearby Great Barrington, titled Windsor Mountain School A Beloved Berkshire Institution. This book is centered on Windsor, referencing several other private schools of the era in the Berkshires, which focused on progressive education.

The school closed in 1975. The original Groton Place mansion now belongs to Boston University's summer Tanglewood Institute for gifted young musicians, and during the rest of the year is used by the Berkshire Country Day School.
