= Scott Buchanan =

Founder of Great Books program at St. John's College

Scott Buchanan (1895 – 1968) was an American philosopher, educator, and foundation consultant. He is best known as the founder, together with Stringfellow Barr, of the Great Books program at St. John's College, at Annapolis, Maryland. (Note: The same program is used at St. John's College's second campus in Santa Fe, New Mexico which was founded in 1964.)

Buchanan's various projects and writings may be understood as an ambitious program of social and cultural reform based on the insight that many crucial problems arise from the uncritical use of symbolism. In this sense, his program was similar to and competed with a number of contemporary movements such as Alfred Korzybski's General Semantics, Otto Neurath's "Unity of Science" project, the semiotics of Charles Morris and the "orthological" projects of Charles Kay Ogden. Buchanan collaborated with the latter effort for a number of years.

Buchanan's own program, however, differed from these generally empiricist, positivist, or pragmatist movements by stressing what he saw as the need for reforms in the mathematical symbolism employed in modern science. Buchanan's first book, Possibility (1927), stated that science is "the greatest body of uncriticized dogma we have today" (Note: Possibility, p. 184) and even likened science to the "Black Arts" (Note: Possibility, p. 139). For the rest of his career, Buchanan pondered ways to mitigate the variety of threats to humanity that he perceived in the unmanaged and unsupervised growth of modern science and technology.

== Background ==
Scott Milross Buchanan was born on March 17, 1895, in Sprague, Washington and raised in Jeffersonville, Vermont. He received his undergraduate degree from Amherst College in 1916, majoring in Greek and mathematics. After serving in the Navy during the final year of World War I, he studied philosophy at Balliol College, Oxford as a Rhodes scholar between 1919 and 1921. He continued his studies in philosophy at Harvard University and received his doctorate in 1925. During his undergraduate years, Buchanan became personally close to Amherst's president Alexander Meiklejohn and was strongly influenced by Meiklejohn's ideas about educational reform.

== Career ==
This continuing interest led Buchanan in 1925 to accept a position as Assistant Director of the People's Institute, an affiliate of the Cooper Union in New York City that was dedicated to adult education and other forms of cultural enrichment for the city's workers and immigrants. It was there that Buchanan met Mortimer J. Adler and Richard McKeon, and the three of them conceived an ambitious program for reviving American education and democracy through mass training in the traditional liberal arts by means of the Socratic method and the Great Books curriculum.

Buchanan spent the next twenty years struggling to establish an institutional base for this radical vision. Buchanan's initial efforts at the People's Institute were followed by his establishment of the Great Books "Virginia Program" at the University of Virginia, where Buchanan was a Professor of Philosophy between 1929 and 1936. He was then invited to the University of Chicago by its president Robert Maynard Hutchins in order to help form a "Committee on Liberal Arts" in association with Buchanan's former People's Institute associates Adler and McKeon. However, this effort failed almost immediately due to philosophical differences and academic politics.

Another opportunity arose at St. John's College in Annapolis, Maryland, an institution dating to the colonial period that had lost its accreditation by 1936 and required reorganization. In 1937, the trustees invited Buchanan and his associate Stringfellow Barr to lead a reorganization of the school. With Barr as president and Buchanan as dean, the two men restructured the curriculum that year around the Great Books "New Program". The curriculum gained national attention and remains in use today, and is the achievement for which Buchanan is primarily remembered.

Buchanan left St. John's College in 1947 after a successful but disillusioning legal struggle with the U.S. Navy, which had been trying to seize the St. John's campus as part of a plan to enlarge the nearby United States Naval Academy. After spending the next two years directing Liberal Arts, Inc., a failed venture to create a Great Books-based college in Massachusetts, Buchanan's democratic vision for the revival of the liberal arts turned from the academic to the political arena. Except for a brief period in 1956 and 1957, when he was a visiting lecturer at Princeton University and also served as chairman of the Religion and Philosophy Departments at Fisk University, he held no more positions in academic institutions. In 1948 Buchanan worked actively in the Progressive Party presidential campaign of Henry Wallace, and for several years afterwards was consultant, trustee, and secretary of the Foundation for World Government. In 1957 Buchanan accepted an invitation by Robert Maynard Hutchins to become a senior fellow at Center for the Study of Democratic Institutions, a liberal political think tank in Santa Barbara, California. Buchanan remained at the Center for the rest of his career, and one of the projects to which he contributed was the Center's efforts to publicize the work of Jacques Ellul in the English-speaking world. (Note: "The Technological Society has had more influence in the United States than anywhere else. The Center for the Study of Democratic Institutions, which had hosted [a 1962 conference on technology and human affairs] and arranged the book’s translation, did much to promote early discussions of Ellul’s argument, especially under the leadership of Robert M. Hutchins and one of the Center’s consultants, Scott Buchanan — both prominent champions of liberal arts education.")

== Work ==
- Possibility (1927): As part of C. K. Ogden's The International Library of Psychology, Philosophy and Scientific Method, this work was published simultaneously in the same series with Mortimer Adler's own first book Dialectic, and each book refers to the other. John Dewey praised Possibility as a "significant intellectual achievement".
- Poetry and Mathematics (1929): Developed from materials for Buchanan's lectures at the People's Institute, this book was recognized by Richard McKeon, who had studied medieval philosophy under Étienne Gilson, as a rediscovery of the medieval trivium and quadrivium. This insight of McKeon's, wrote Buchanan in 1961, is what led to the "radical reform of teaching and learning in a small province of the modern academy" for which Buchanan is remembered today. The American philosopher Morris Cohen praised Poetry and Mathematics as "an admirable piece of work."
- Symbolic Distance in Relation to Analogy and Fiction (1932): Appeared in London as part of Ogden's "Psyche Miniatures" series. Part of it had been published earlier in Psyche, the journal of Ogden's Orthological Institute. Although Buchanan later claimed that this work was inspired by a year's study of the English logician George Boole, it does not mention Boole. Rather, Symbolic Distance was obviously written in collaboration with Ogden's investigation of the linguistic theories of Jeremy Bentham, and Ogden cites Symbolic Distance in his own book Bentham's Theory of Fictions. This is the first of Buchanan's books to mention the medieval trivium and quadrivium.
- The Doctrine of Signatures: A Defence of Theory in Medicine (1938): Also (like Possibility) as part of Ogden's International Library of Psychology, Philosophy and Scientific Method. A portion of the first chapter had appeared earlier in the 1934 issue of Psyche, under the title "Introduction to Medieval Orthology".
- Truth in the Sciences (1950): Completed under contract to the Encyclopædia Britannica for a project that never materialized. The manuscript was published posthumously in book form by the University of Virginia in 1972
- Essay in Politics (1953): Stemming from his involvement with the 1948 Wallace campaign and later with the Foundation for World Government, Buchanan reflects on the problems of political representation and democracy that are posed by technology and industrialization. Buchanan continued to work on these ideas during his years at the Center for the Study of Democratic Institutions.

== See also ==
- St. John's College (Annapolis/Santa Fe)
- Liberal Arts, Inc.
- Center for the Study of Democratic Institutions
- Robert Maynard Hutchins
- Mortimer Adler
- Alexander Meiklejohn
- Liberal arts
- Trivium
- Quadrivium
- Adult education
- World government
- American philosophy
- List of American philosophers
