= Annette Lewis Phinazee =

American librarian

Alethia Annette Lewis Hoage Phinazee
- Dr. Phinazee in 1970
- Born: Alethia Annette Lewis; July 20, 1920; Orangeburg, South Carolina, U.S.
- Died: September 17, 1983 (aged 63); Durham, North Carolina, U.S.
- Education: Fisk University (BA 1960); University of Illinois (MS 1948); Columbia University (PhD 1961)
- Occupations: librarian, educator
- Employer(s): Clark Atlanta University, North Carolina Central University
- Children: Ramona Edelin

Alethia Annette Lewis Hoage Phinazee (July 23, 1920 – September 17, 1983, in Durham, North Carolina) was the first woman and the first black American woman to earn the doctorate in library science from Columbia University. She was called a trailblazer for her work as a librarian and educator.

== Early life and education ==
Phinazee was born on July 23, 1920, in Orangeburg, South Carolina. Her parents, William Charles and Althia Lightner Lewis, were educators. Born Alethia Annette Lewis, she took the surnames of her first (George Lafayette Hoage, m. 1944, d. 1945) and second (Joseph Phinazee, m. 1962) husbands.

Phinazee attended the public schools of Orangeburg and graduated with a Bachelor of Arts degree in modern foreign languages from Fisk University in 1939. She received the bachelor of library science degree in 1941 and the master of library science degree in 1948 from the University of Illinois.

In 1961 she was the first woman and the first black American woman to earn a doctorate in library science from the Columbia University School of Library Service. Her dissertation, "The Library of Congress Classification in the United States: A survey of opinions and practices with attention to the problems of structure and application", has been described as a seminal work in library science. Her research, which examined how Library of Congress Classification was used by library staff and patrons, was one of the first instances where patron use of the system was considered.

== Career ==
Phinazee started her teaching career in North Carolina at the Caswell County Training School from 1939 to 1940 as a teacher-librarian. She was a cataloguer in the library at Talladega College in Alabama from 1941 to 1942. From 1942 until 1944 she held the position of journalism librarian at Lincoln University of Missouri. She taught cataloging and classification courses at the Atlanta University School of Library Service (1946–57). After serving as a cataloguer at Southern Illinois University (1957–62), she returned to Atlanta University as head of special services, which included the administration of the Trevor Arnett Library's Negro Collection – a world-renowned depository of American Africana (1962–67) – and returned to a professorship at the School of Library Service (1963–69). In 1969, she became assistant director of the Cooperative College Library Center in Atlanta. This was a library-centered service adjunct of the United Board for College Development whose mission was to develop the libraries of historically black colleges and universities.

Phinazee became dean of the North Carolina Central University School of Library Science in 1970. She was elected the first black president of the North Carolina Library Association in 1975. She was renowned by colleagues as an educator and counselor to generations of black American librarians, receiving honors from the Black Caucus of the American Library Association in 1978.

== Legacy ==
Phinazee died on September 17, 1983, in Durham, North Carolina. Her daughter, Ramona Hoage Edelin (born 1945), became an academic and activist who helped popularize use of the term "African American."

In 1984 the Annette Lewis Phinazee Award was established at the NCCU School of Library and Information Sciences. The award was conceived as a memorial to her work to improve the people of North Carolina's access to African-American children's literature and is awarded each year to an individual or organization doing similar work. She was posthumously awarded the North Carolina Library Association's Distinguished Service Award in 1989.
