= Gerald Hausman =

American author (born 1945)

Gerald Andrews Hausman (born October 13, 1945) is a storyteller and award-winning author of books about Native America, animals, mythology, and West Indian culture. Hausman has published over seventy books for both children and adults.

== Biography ==
Born in Baltimore, Maryland, to engineer father Sidney Hausman and mother Dorothy "Little" Hausman, Gerald grew up in New Jersey and Massachusetts before moving to New Mexico for college. Hausman attended New Mexico Highlands University in Las Vegas, New Mexico, where he obtained his B.A. in English literature.

After graduation, Hausman married Loretta "Lorry" Wright and moved to Lenox, Massachusetts, where he taught creative writing and English at the Windsor Mountain School. The Hausmans, along with David Silverstein, founded The Bookstore Press, which published some of the first paperback books for children. These included such authors as Ruth Krauss, Maurice Sendak, Crockett Johnson, Aram Saroyan and Paul Metcalf. In 1977, Gerald and Lorry moved to Tesuque, New Mexico, where they lived for seventeen years, raising two daughters, Hannah and Mariah.

During this time, Hausman worked as poetry teacher, editor, publisher and English teacher at Santa Fe Preparatory School in nearby Santa Fe, going on to found the Blue Harbour School of Creative Writing on the former estate of playwright Noël Coward in Port Maria, Jamaica. In addition, he worked as a poet in the schools in the city of Pittsfield, Massachusetts.

Starting with the 2002 publication The Boy From Nine Miles: The Early Life of Bob Marley, Hausmann has collaborated on five books co-authored with Cedella Marley, the daughter of late musician Bob Marley.

Hausman has performed readings and storytellings throughout the United States and Europe. He has also been a presenter for National Public Radio, History Channel, Haunted History: Caribbean, John F. Kennedy Center for the Performing Arts, Miami Book Fair International and American Library Association.

== Awards ==
- Union College Poetry Prize, 1965 for Quebec Poems
- American Folklore Society, Aesop Accolade Award (Children's Section), 1995 for Duppy Talk: West Indian Tales of Mystery and Magic
- Notable Social Studies Book for Young people designation, Children's Book Council (CBC)/ National Council for the Social Studies, 1996, and 1999, for Doctor Bird: Three Lookin' Up Tales from Jamaica
- Pick of the Lists Selection, the American Booksellers Association (ABA), 1999, for Dogs of Myth: Tales from Around the World
- Bank Street College of Education Best Book Selection, 2000, for Tom Cringle: Battle on the High Seas and Cats of Myth: Tales from around the World
- Parents' Choice Award Silver Medal for NonFiction, designation, 2003
- New York Public Library Best Book for the Teen Age designation, 2004 for Escape from Botany Bay
- National Council for the Social Studies/Children's Book Council, Best Book Designation, 2007, for A Mind With Wings
- Midwest Book Awards Children's Picture Books, Illustration: Graphic, and Total Book Design, USA Today Best Books Award, Foreword IndieFab Book of the Year in Picture Books, Early Reader, 2013, for "The Otter, The Spotted Frog and the Great Flood: A Creek Indian Story."

== Works ==
=== Fiction ===
- The Shivurrus Plant of Mopant, Giligia Press, 1968
- New Marlboro Stage, Giligia Press, 1968 & Bookstore Press, 1971
- Circle Meadow, Bookstore Press, 1972
- The Boy with the Sun Tree Bow, Berkshire Traveller, 1973
- Beth: The Little Girl of Pine Knoll, Bookstore Press, 1974
- Sitting on the Blue-Eyed Bear: Navajo Myths & Legends, Lawrence Hill, 1975
- Night Herding Song, Copper Canyon Press, 1979
- The Day the White Whales Came to Bangor, Cobblesmith Books, 1979
- No Witness, Stackpole Books, 1980
- Runners, Sunstone Press, 1984
- Meditations with Animals, Bear & Co., 1986
- Meditations with the Navajo, Bear & Co., 1989
- Stargazer, Lotus Press, 1989
- Turtle Dream, Mariposa, 1991
- Turtle Island Alphabet, St. Martin's Press, 1992
- The Gift of the Gila Monster, Simon & Schuster, 1993
- Ghost Walk, Mariposa, 1993
- Tunkashila, St. Martin's Press, 1993
- Turtle Island ABC, HarperCollins, 1994
- Duppy Talk, Simon & Schuster, 1994
- The Sun Horse, Lotus Press, 1995
- Coyote Walks on Two Legs, Philomel, 1995
- How Chipmunk Got Tiny Feet, HarperCollins, 1995
- Doctor Moledinky's Castle, Simon & Schuster, 1995
- Prayer to the Great Mystery, St. Martin's Press, 1995
- Eagle Boy, HarperCollins, 1996
- Night Flight, Philomel, 1996
- The Kebra Nagast, St. Martin's Press, 1997
- The Story of Blue Elk, Clarion, 1998
- Doctor Bird, Philomel, 1998
- The Coyote Bead, Hampton Roads, 1999
- Tom Cringle (Book One), illustrated by Tad Hills, Simon & Schuster, 2000
- Tom Cringle (Book Two), illustrated by Tad Hills, Simon & Schuster, 2001
- Castaways: Stories of Survival, Greenwillow, 2003
- Ghost Walk: Native American Tales of the Spirit, Irie Books, 2005
- Duppy Talk: West Indian Tales of Mystery & Magic, Irie Books, 2007
- How Chipmunk Got Tiny Feet, Irie Books, 2008
- Doctor Bird: Three lookin' Up Tales from Jamaica, Irie Books, 2008
- Time Swimmer, Macmillan Caribbean, 2009
- The Image Taker: The Selected Stories and Photographs of Edward S. Curtis, World Wisdom, 2009
- Mermaids, Manatees and Bimini Blind Snakes: My Life on a Barrier Island, Irie Books, 2012
- Rastafarian Children of Solomon: The Legacy of the Kebra Nagast and the Path to Peace and Understanding, Bear & Co./Inner Traditions, 2013
- The Otter, the Spotted Frog & The Great Flood: A Creek Indian Story, Wisdom Tales Press, 2013
- Island Dreams: Selected Poems, Longhouse Publishers, 2015
- Evil Chasing Way, Speaking Volumes, 2017
- Hand Trembler, Speaking Volumes, 2018
- Sungazer, Speaking Volumes, 2018
- Little Miracles, Stay Thirsty Media, 2019

=== Digital ===
- The American Storybag: A Collection of Tales, Stay Thirsty Media, 2010
- Not Since Mark Twain, Stay Thirsty Media, 2012
- Escape From Botany Bay: The True Story of Mary Bryant, Irie Books, 2011
- Wilderness: The Story of Mountain Men John Colter and Hugh Glass, Irie Books, 2011
- All Is Beautiful All Around Me: Navajo Ways and Ceremonial Stories, Irie Books, 2011
- The Mythology of Cats: Feline Legend and Lore Through the Ages, Irie Books, 2011
- The Mythology of Dogs: Canine Legend and Lore Through the Ages, Irie Books, 2011
- The Forbidden Ride: An Icelandic Love Story, Stay Thirsty Media, 2014
- The Evil Chasing Way, Speaking Volumes, 2017
- Hand Trembler, Speaking Volumes, 2018
- Sungazer, Speaking Volumes, 2018

=== Collaborations with Loretta Hausman ===
- The Pancake Book, Persea Books, 1975
- The Yogurt Book, Persea Books, 1976
- The Mythology of Dogs, St. Martin's Press, 1997 & Griffin paperback, 1998
- The Mythology of Cats, St. Martin's Press, 1998 & Berkeley paperback, 2000
- Dogs of Myth: Tales from Around the World (Illustrated by Barry Moser), Simon & Schuster, 1999
- Cats of Myth, Simon & Schuster, 2000
- The Metaphysical Cat, Hampton Roads, 2001
- The Mythology of Horses, Three Rivers/Random House, 2003
- Escape From Botany Bay, Orchard/Scholastic, 2003
- Napoleon and Josephine, Orchard/Scholastic, 2004
- Horses of Myth, E.P. Dutton, 2005
- A Mind with Wings: The Story of Henry David Thoreau, Shambhala/Random House, 2006
- The Healing Horse, Houghton Mifflin, 2006

=== Other collaborations ===
- The Berkshire Anthology (with David Silverstein), Bookstore Press, 1972
- Wilderness (with Roger Zelazny), Tor Books, 1994
- African American Alphabet (with Kelvin Rodriques), St. Martin's Press, 1996
- The Jacob Ladder (with Uton Hinds), Orchard Books, 2001
- The Boy From Nine Miles, (with Cedella Marley), Hampton Roads, 2002
- 56 Thoughts From 56 Hope Road, (with Cedella Marley), Tuff Gong Books, 2002
- The Jacob Ladder (with Uton Hinds), Scholastic, 2003
- 60 Visions (with Cedella Marley), Tuff Gong Books, 2005
- Three Little Birds (with Cedella Marley), Tuff Gong Books, 2006
- Floating Stone: 21 Thoughts of Kenji Miyazawa, with Kenji Okuhira, Irie Books, 2012
- The Future Is The Beginning: The Words and Wisdom of Bob Marley (with Cedella Marley), Tuff Gong Books/Harmony, 2012
- Guns, Edited by Gerald Hausman, Speaking Volumes, 2016

=== Audio ===
- Stargazer, Sunset, 1991
- Turtle Island Alphabet, Sunset, 1992
- Navajo Nights, Sunset, 1993
- Native American Animal Stories, Sunset, 1993
- The Turquoise Horse, Irie Books, 2006
- Drum Talk, Speaking Volumes, 2010
- Ghost Walk, Speaking Volumes, 2010
- Native American Animal Stories, Speaking Volumes, 2010
- Navajo Nights, Speaking Volumes, 2010
- Stargazer, Speaking Volumes, 2010
- The Turquoise Horse, Speaking Volumes, 2010
- Wilderness, Speaking Volumes, 2013
- Meditations With the Navajo, Inner Traditions/Bear & Co., 2019
- Rastafarian Children of Solomon, Inner Traditions/Bear & Co., 2019
