= Tad Hills =

American writer

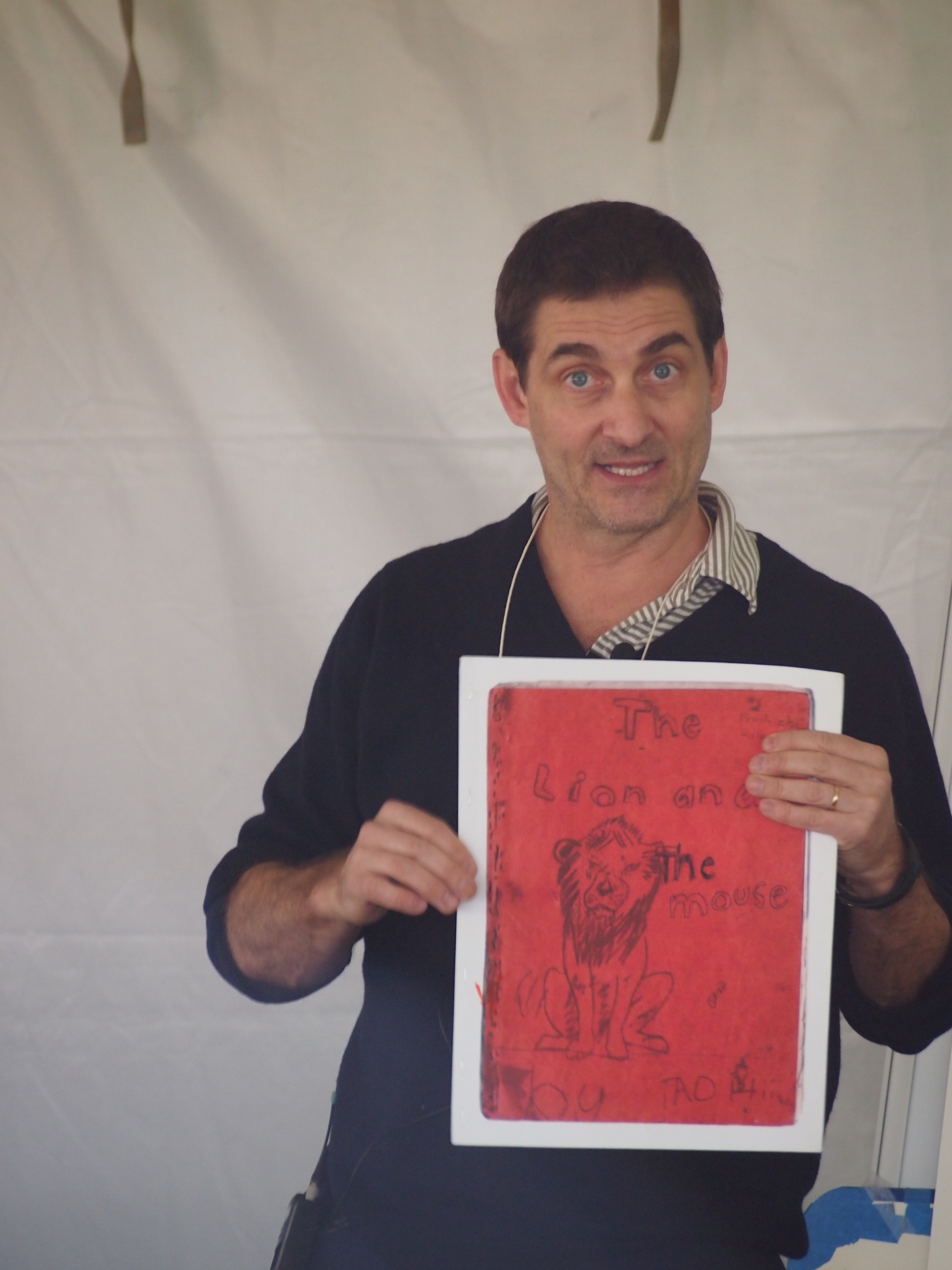
- reading at the 2014 Gaithersburg Book Festival
- Born: April 1, 1963 (age 63); Needham, Massachusetts
- Writing career
- Genre: Children's fiction
- Website: tadhills.com

Tad Hills (born April 1, 1963, in Needham, Massachusetts) is an American children's book author and illustrator. His first picture book, Duck & Goose, a New York Times bestseller and ALA Notable Book for Children, is about a pair of feathered friends. In a starred review, Kirkus Reviews wrote that "readers will likely hope to see more of this adorable odd couple"—a hope that was realized. The Duck & Goose series now contains nine titles, including Duck, Duck, Goose; Duck & Goose Find a Pumpkin; and Duck & Goose, It's Time for Christmas. An animated series based on the books premiered on Apple TV+ on July 8, 2022.

Hills is also the author of How Rocket Learned to Read, winner of the Irma Simonton Black & James H. Black Award for Excellence in Children's Literature and a New York Times bestseller. A sequel, Rocket Writes a Story, was published to similar acclaim, debuting at #1 on the New York Times Best Seller list and named as a top picture book of the year by Amazon.com, Barnes & Noble, Publishers Weekly, and School Library Journal.

== Early life and career ==
Hills was raised in Norwell, Massachusetts, in a creative household. His grandmother was an accomplished artist—together, she and Hills created paintings, drawings, and books. His mother, a 4th-grade science teacher, inspired his love of nature by frequently bringing home animals (including raccoons, owls, and other wild creatures). "I come from a long line of engineers on both sides, so my interest in making things almost feels like it could be genetic", Hills has said.

Hills graduated with a degree in art from Skidmore College in New York. He states, however, that his greatest educational experience has been raising his children: "Spending time with my kids helps me remember what it's like to be a child. I try to capture that innocence and enthusiastic vision of the world in my books. I want kids to see themselves in my characters".

Hills has dabbled in many arts, including acting, jewelrymaking, and interior designing. He began illustrating picture books in the late ’90s when his wife, Lee Wade, was the VP and creative director for Simon & Schuster's children's book division: "Lee used to ask me to try illustrating some books she couldn't find an illustrator for," he said. Hills published the first book in his breakout Duck & Goose series in 2006, when Wade and friend Anne Schwartz began Schwartz & Wade Books (a Random House imprint).

Hills lives in Brooklyn with his wife and two children.

== Selected bibliography ==
Author & Illustrator:

- Duck & Goose, Goose Needs a Hug (2012)
- Rocket Writes a Story (2012)
- Duck & Goose, Here Comes the Easter Bunny! (2012)
- Duck & Goose, It's Time for Christmas (2010)
- Duck & Goose, How Are You Feeling? (2009)
- Duck & Goose, Find a Pumpkin (2009)
- Duck & Goose, 1, 2, 3 (2008)
- What's Up, Duck? (2008)
- Duck, Duck, Goose (2007)
- Duck & Goose (2006)
- My Fuzzy Safari Babies: A Book to Touch & Feel (2001)
- My Fuzzy Farm Babies: A Book to Touch & Feel (2001)
- Knock Knock Who's There?: My First Book of Knock Knock Jokes (2000)
- My Fuzzy Friends (1999)

Illustrator:

- Waking Up, Wendell by April Stevens (2007)
- Hey Diddle Riddle by Wendi Silvano (2004)
- Tom Cringle: The Pirate and the Patriot by Gerald Hausman (2001)
- Tom Cringle: Battle on the High Seas by Gerald Hausman (2000)
- A Name on the Quilt by Jeannine Atkins (1999)
