= Stringfellow Barr =

Founder of Great Books program at St. John's College

- Born: January 15, 1897; Suffolk, Virginia
- Died: February 2, 1982 (aged 85); Alexandria, Virginia

Stringfellow Barr (January 15, 1897 – February 2, 1982) was an American historian, author, and former president of St. John's College in Annapolis, Maryland, where he, together with Scott Buchanan, instituted the Great Books curriculum.

== Career ==
Barr was the editor of Virginia Quarterly Review from 1931 to 1937. He established and was president of the Foundation for World Government from 1948 to 1958. In the 1950s, he taught classics at Rutgers University.

Barr wrote compact yet lucid historical surveys of three major periods of Western history. Two of his books, The Will of Zeus and The Mask of Jove deal with the Greeks and Romans, respectively. He also wrote The Pilgrimage of Western Man, dealing with Western history from the Renaissance through the early post-World War II era.

His nickname was "Winkie."

In a 1951 New York Post column, Arthur Schlesinger Jr. mocked Barr as belonging to the "solve-the-Russian-problem-by-giving-them-money school," along with Carey McWilliams and Thomas Emerson. Schlesinger said of them, "None of these gentlemen is a Communist, but none of them objects very much to Communism. They are the Typhoid Marys of the left, bearing the germs of the infection even if not suffering obviously from the disease."

Barr's views on the poor quality of American education and an American society driven by consumerist ideology are presented in ironic terms in Purely Academic (1958), a classic academic novel set in an anonymous Corn Belt university during the McCarthy period, as when a character in the story says that

Many observers here and abroad note a kind of higher illiteracy in our college graduates. But we like it that way. In our cars we like horsepower; in our studies we like slow-motion and low-gear. In education the intellectually second-rate does not shock us. To insist on the first-rate would be arrogant. Anyhow, if we are so second-rate, how come we are the richest nation in recorded history and the fattest people on earth?

In 1959, Barr was one of a number of signatories to a petition asking the U. S. Congress to abolish the House Committee on Unamerican Activities. Other notable signatories included Eleanor Roosevelt and Reinhold Niebuhr.

Barr wrote The Kitchen Garden Book (New York: Viking Press, 1956) with Stella Standard. The Kitchen Garden is a manual on growing and cooking common vegetables.

New York Times reviewer Edmund Fuller called his 1958 novel, Purely Academic, "bitterly hilarious," "sadistically satirical," and "funny and appalling."

Barr died on February 2, 1982.

== Notes ==
1. "Colonist", Time Magazine, August 19, 1946.
2. Navasky, Victor, 1980; Naming Names; p. 54 of the 2003 reprint by Hill and Wang; ISBN 0-8090-0183-7

== See also ==
- Liberal Arts, Inc.
