= Douglas Wood (writer) =

American author, writer, creative executive, director, and producer

Douglas Wood is an American author, writer, actor, creative executive, director, producer and professor. He has been a VP of Animation Development and Production for Steven Spielberg at Amblin Entertainment, Turner Pictures, Warner Bros. and Universal.

== Biography ==
Wood was born in Chicago, Illinois, where he acted in productions at The Next Theatre Company, The Goodman Theatre, Steppenwolf Theatre, Victory Gardens Theater, The Forum Theatre and The Second City among others. He studied acting at Illinois State University and the Webber Douglas Academy of Dramatic Arts in London. Wood formed a comedy duo with Cheryl Rhoads entitled The Fine Line, playing comedy clubs and theaters in Chicago and later L.A., including The Improv and The Comedy Store. The Fine Line's vignettes on human relationships, entitled "An Evening with the Fine Line", ran for nine months in Chicago at the Ruth Page Theater. Upon arriving in L.A., Wood and Rhoads were spotted and signed by the William Morris Agency and they soon performed (twice) on The Merv Griffin Show. This led to Wood becoming a series regular and staff writer on the NBC variety series, The Motown Revue Starring Smokey Robinson.

Wood has worked as the creative executive for the Annie award winning films The Iron Giant and Cats Don't Dance as well as We're Back! and Balto. He also served as the creative executive for the Emmy Award winning TV series Tiny Toon Adventures and Animaniacs. Wood has created two animated television series: Little Einsteins for Disney and Mama Mirabelle's Home Movies for National Geographic (for which he also authored the children's book, When Mama Mirabelle Comes Home.)

In addition to his work for Disney, he has written television shows for children at Apple TV+ where he also served as Showrunner/Executive Producer on Duck & Goose, Nickelodeon, Discovery Kids, the BBC, Fremantle Media, Netflix, Cirque du Soleil, Mattel, DHX and more. Molly of Denali, a PBS series on which Wood was Story Editor, won a Peabody Award.

In 2011, Wood directed, produced (with Jennifer Clymer) and wrote (with Maureen Kelly) live-action short, Hi, Lillian which starred veteran actor, Pat Crawford Brown, an improv student of Wood's at the MPTV Fund. The film won the Audience Award for Best Short at three film festivals: Dances With Films '15, Prescott Film Festival 2012, and the 12th Annual Valley Film Festival. Wood also won an award for Best Emerging Filmmaker at the Prescott Film Festival. Hi, Lillian was an Official Selection at the AWEsome Film Festival in San Jose, CA, the Reel Recovery Festivals in L.A., NY, American Independent Film Festival, the Legacy Film Festival in San Francisco and the Seoul International Senior Film Festival in Seoul, Korea.

In 2013 Wood wrote, directed and executive produced the short film Entanglement, which received a Best Short Award at the Independent Film Quarterly Film Festival in 2014. The film also won an Award of Merit from the Best Shorts Competition, 2014 and was an Official Selection at the Dances With Films Festival in Hollywood and the First Glance Festival - L.A.

In 2020, Wood authored the novel, Ladies of the Canyon, a psychological thriller, published by Prospective Press.

At the Motion Picture and Television Fund, Wood volunteered his services for ten years instructing senior citizens on the craft of Improvisation. He also teaches Improvisation in the Theatre department at the University of New Mexico.

== Notable works ==
=== Apple TV+ ===
Duck & Goose (Showrunner/Executive Producer)

=== Prospective Press ===
Author of psychological thriller, Ladies of the Canyon

=== PBS Kids ===
- Molly of Denali (Story Editor, Writer)

=== Amblin Entertainment ===
During his time as an executive at Amblin, Wood helped develop and was the creative executive for the following works:

- Balto
- We're Back! A Dinosaur's Story
- Tiny Toon Adventures
- Animaniacs
- A Wish for Wings That Work
- Family Dog
- Fievel's American Tails
- Back to the Future: The Animated Series

=== Warner Bros./Turner ===
Wood worked on the following animations:

- Cats Don't Dance (Executive)
- The Iron Giant (Executive)
- Osmosis Jones (Executive)
- Scooby-Doo! and the Monster of Mexico (Screenwriter)

=== Disney ===
Wood was involved with the following projects:

- Little Einsteins (Writer, Developer)
- JoJo's Circus (Writer, Story Editor)
- Handy Manny (Writer)
- Johnny and the Sprites (Writer)
- Playhouse Disney Live! Stage musical at California Adventure theme park, Disney World and Disney Paris. (Writer)

=== Nickelodeon ===
- Zack & Quack (Writer, multiple episodes)

=== National Geographic ===
Wood was involved with the following projects for National Geographic:

- Mama Mirabelle's Home Movies (Creator, TV series)
- When Mama Mirabelle Comes Home (Author, Children's Book)

=== NBCUniversal/Kids Sprout ===
- Chloe's Closet (Writer, season 2)
- Floogals! (Head Writer and Co-Creator)

=== Discovery Kids ===
- ToddWorld (Writer)

=== Skechers Entertainment ===
- Twinkle Toes (Writer, animated DVD feature)

=== BBC and Fremantle Media Enterprises ===
- Tree Fu Tom (Head Writer and Co-Developer, animated series)

=== The Hub ===
- Secret Millionaires Club (Writer)

=== HIT Entertainment ===
- Bob the Builder (Writer)

=== Amazon ===
- Tumble Leaf (Writer, multiple episodes)

Winner of Annie Award, Best Preschool Series; Winner of thirteen Emmy Awards including Outstanding Preschool Children's Animated Series.

=== Netflix/Cirque Du Soleil ===
- Luna Petunia (Writer, multiple episodes)

=== Mattel, Inc./DHX ===
- Bob the Builder (Head Writer)

=== Netflix/7ate9 ===
- Wonderoos (Story Editor, Writer)

=== Miscellaneous ===
- Kahlil Gibran's The Prophet (Contributed dialogue to animated feature directed by Roger Allers starring the voices of Liam Neeson, Salma Hayek and John Krasinski)

== Awards ==
=== "Molly of Denali" ===
- Peabody Award

=== "Hi, Lillian" ===
- Best Short - Dances with Films Festival
- Best Short - Valley Film Festival
- Best Short - Prescott Film Festival
- Best Emerging Filmmaker - Prescott Film Festival

=== "Entanglement" ===
- Best Short - Independent Quarterly Film Festival
- Award of Merit - Best Shorts Competition

=== Acting ===
- “Best Actor in a Revue” Joseph Jefferson Award for “An Evening with the Fine Line” at the Ruth Page Theatre in Chicago
- “Best Actor” Dramalogue Award for “An Evening with the Fine Line” at the Beverly Hills Playhouse.
- "Best Ensemble" Joseph Jefferson Citation for "Class Enemy" at the Next Theatre Company in Evanston, IL.
