= Liberal Arts, Inc. =

Liberal Arts, Inc., was a corporation founded in late 1946, which intended to create a Great Books-based liberal arts college in Stockbridge, Massachusetts. It is notable for failing despite the involvement of four educators of stellar reputation, and an offer of an apparently generous endowment, later withdrawn under unclear circumstances.

== History ==
In 1937, Stringfellow Barr and Scott Buchanan successfully established the Great Books curriculum at St. John's College Annapolis, Maryland, which continues to the present day. In 1946, Barr resigned the presidency of that institution "with the hearty good wishes of the board of trustees" to found a new college.

According to Glen Edward Avery, Barr thought St. John's had grown too large and feared that its land was about to be seized by the U.S. Navy for its own academy. The first such threat had been made in 1940; St. John's was saved only by the direct intervention of President Roosevelt and Secretary of the Navy Frank Knox. A 1946 newspaper story says that "the college's Damocles sword again threatened to drop in 1944, by which time St. John's had lost its two greatest friends in the government." The college's board of trustees was unable to get a definite answer from Congress, then in control of federal land-taking, on whether St. John's land would be taken, and Barr wanted to secure "a home free of the endless menace of eviction."

Charles A. Nelson, in Radical Visions, his biography of Barr and Buchanan, says they were convinced that "the navy would never accept final defeat... They were wrong, but their judgement at the time is hard to fault. No one who can recall the temper of those times will forget how powerful the navy was."

== Location ==
Several sites were considered for the new college. The first choice was a site in New Lebanon, N.Y., occupied by the Darrow School, which refused to sell. The final choice was the estate of Dan Hanna (son of Mark Hanna) in Stockbridge, Massachusetts.

The choice of this location may have been influenced by Scott Buchanan, who, according to Samuel Sass, was familiar with the area, having graduated in 1912 from Pittsfield High School. The site, officially known as Bonny Brier Farm, already contained eighteen buildings, including an inn, a dormitory, and a boathouse located on 2,500 feet (760 m) of lakeshore frontage on the lake known as Stockbridge Bowl. When the project was announced in 1946, Buchanan expected the institution to be open by September 1947, indicating that "the present buildings are sufficient to answer its purposes for the opening and the number of students attending in the first year or two." The site was about a mile and a half from Tanglewood, home of what was then called the Berkshire Symphonic Festival; in fact, it was the venue for that festival in 1934 and 1935, the first two years of its existence.

== Corporation launched ==
The enterprise was launched with a $4.5 million endowment from Paul W. Mellon, son of Andrew W. Mellon. Mellon had attended St. John's as a freshman in 1939, despite already holding degrees from Yale and Clare College, Cambridge, and studied there until 1942 when he left to enter the Army.

A corporation was formed, named "Liberal Arts, Inc." Members of the corporation included Barr, Buchanan, famous educators Mark Van Doren of Columbia University and Mortimer J. Adler of the University of Chicago, two Pittsfield attorneys, and a legal secretary. Sass indicates that Robert M. Hutchins and Alexander Meiklejohn, former president of Amherst College and another "great books" luminary, also planned to join the college. The Hanna estate was purchased and deeded to the corporation in March 1947.

The Hanna farm property was later sold in 1948 to Hans Maeder, who founded the Stockbridge School on the site. The school, a private school for adolescents, operated from 1949 to 1976 and was notable for being completely racially integrated from its inception.. The Stockbridge School included Jackie Robinson's son among its attendees.

== Abandonment and controversy ==
In August 1947, it was formally announced that the project was abandoned. Conflicting accounts of the circumstances subsequently transpired.

The stated reason was "inability to secure funds for the extensive building program needed to provide an adequate physical plant." In more detail, the trustees of the Old Dominion Foundation—Mellon's fund "felt it was unwise to authorize invasion of principal for fear that the remaining endowment would be insufficient to accomplish the purpose of the gift. It was also felt that under the circumstances it would be wiser to place the endowment with an existing institution capable of housing the educational project which Old Dominion was prepared to endow. No such institution was found and it is understood that the grant will revert to the general funds of the foundation."

Sass suggests that that was not the real reason, but does not say what the real reason was:

The published reason was that the Mellon grant of $4½ million was not sufficient to convert the existing buildings and grounds into a complex suitable for a campus. Personally, I never believed that this was the real reason. Although I came to know Scott Buchanan well, I did not pursue the matter because I was sure he did not want to talk about it. His son, Dr. Douglas Buchanan, a psychiatrist in the eastern part of the state, tells me that there was a "misunderstanding" between Paul Mellon and the board of directors.

A November 1947 article in the Springfield Republican says plainly that there was a conflict over politics:

Paul Mellon of Pittsburg, who was to have been the "angel" in the proposed new liberal-arts college... was there a few days before announcement was made that he had withdrawn his offer. It was said at the time that the political activities of an associate of Mr. Barr, annoyed Mr. Mellon and that was the reason the offer was withdrawn.

Charles A. Nelson devotes an entire chapter in Radical Visions to the episode. He tells a complex and detailed story which does not mention any political issues and essentially agrees with the publicly stated reasons. In his view, Barr and Buchanan overreached, and believed that Mellon would agree or had agreed to a plan much more ambitious than his original intention.

Nelson makes clear the depth of Mellon's interest; this was not a casual millionaire's whim. Mellon had read a 1940 article about St. John's in Life Magazine, and wrote in his autobiography that after reading the article he drove to Annapolis

to offer financial assistance for the project, but I got so interested in it—this curriculum rooted in the medieval system of the trivium and the quadrivium—that I decided to sign on as a student.... I started in the autumn of 1940 as a mature student, being about fourteen years older than my fellow freshmen.... Mathematics proved a big problem. Purely by memorizing theorems at Choate, I had done well in plane geometry and had got a perfect score on my College Board examination, but at St. John's the students were assigned some ten theorems a day. We were supposed to work them out to their QED solely by logic. When asked to prove one at the blackboard early in my first term, I was flabbergasted and unable to go beyond the first segment. This was highly embarrassing for a Yale and Cambridge graduate! ... I enjoyed my study of Greek language and literature, but I was very conscious of being nearer in age to the instructors than to the students, so after about six months I gave it up [to join the army].

In April 1946 Mellon wrote of an interest in "setting up an initial endowment for the St. John's Program" but of being "deterred from action by doubts as to whether St. John's College could keep its campus." He therefore set up the endowment but left in Barr's hands as to where the endowment should go. If St. John's was likely to lose its campus,

it might be more in the interest of American education to find a stronger institutional vehicle to develop the educational program which you initiated at St. John's. I am therefore placing at the disposal of the Old Dominion Foundation securities, currently producing an income of $125,000 per annum, which may be used for the purpose of developing the type of education now carried on at St. John's College, and for other similar purposes.

The Navy issue was resolved in favor of the college, so it might have been expected that Barr would recommend using the endowment to fund the St. John's program. Instead, Barr and Buchanan decided to found a new college. Nelson notes that "The grant letter did not envision starting a new college from scratch." Yet "the speed with which the two moved from seeking an existing institution stronger than St. John's to acquiring property for a new college seems to indicate that Barr made no significant effort to find such an institution." Nelson suggests a fundamental understanding, in which "Mellon accepted the idea of a new college in the expectation that Barr could raise the additional funds to sustain it, whereas Barr interpreted Mellon's acceptance of the substitution as a sign that he, Mellon, would supply the necessary additional funds." In a 1947 letter, Mellon wrote:

Dear Winkie: ...my idea (and I understood it to be yours) was that some college for undergraduates similar in size and curriculum to St. John's should be the beneficiary of the gift. When you went to Massachusetts, it was my understanding that it was to form such a college. Through circumstances beyond your control, that project now appears unfeasible, if not impossible, within any reasonable amount of time, chiefly due to the lack of qualified teachers and adequate building funds. As an alternative, you have requested Old Dominion Foundation, through me, to release the entire benefits of the endowment fund to Liberal Arts, Inc.... for purposes which seem to me extremely vague.... Since I am extremely doubtful that the income from this endowment would in the long run be adequate to carry on whatever purpose you envisage (which I gather would involve considerable expansion of your present adult education plan), and in addition take care of a future undergraduate college, I do not feel at liberty to recommend such action to Old Dominion Foundation as being practical or consistent with our original agreement, intentions or plans. Under the circumstances, it would seem the wisest and fairest thing to do would be to abandon any plans in connection with the Stockbridge project on the grounds of the impossibility or impracticality of carrying out the original intention, that is, of providing endowment for a college for undergraduates similar in size and curriculum to St. John's College.

== See also ==
- Educational perennialism
- Great Books
- Western canon

== Notes ==
1. (Barr's reasons for leaving St. John's in 1946) Entry for (Frank) Stringfellow Barr in The Scribner Encyclopedia of American Lives, Volume 1: 1981–1985. Charles Scribner's Sons, 1998.
2. (naval "Sword of Damocles" hanging over St. John's) "Hanna Estate Bought for Institution; Barr, Buchanan Coming Here from St. John's." The Berkshire Eagle, December 9, 1946
3. Charles A. Nelson (2001): Radical Visions: Stringfellow Barr, Scott Buchanan, and Their Efforts on behalf of Education and Politics in the Twentieth Century. Bergin and Garvey, Westport, CT. ISBN 0-89789-804-4.
4. (Darrow school first choice) "Building Costs Sound Knell of New Liberal Arts College," The Berkshire Eagle, August 28, 1947
5. Samuel Sass, 1976: (Buchanan familiar with Berkshires) "A Berkshire St. John's: The college we lost." The Berkshire Eagle, October 12, 1976.
6. (Buildings adequate for opening) "New Liberal Arts College Buys 700 Acres at Pittsfield, Mass. Institution, Not Yet Named, Gets Site West of Stockbridge Bowl. Project was Endowed by Paul W. Mellon." The New York Times, December 10, 1947 p. 33
7. (Paul Mellon attending St. John's) "Hanna Estate Bought for Institution..." The Berkshire Eagle, December 9, 1946
8. (members of corporation) "Hanna Estate Bought for Institution; Barr, Buchanan Coming Here from St. John's." The Berkshire Eagle, December 9, 1946
9. (Hutchins and Meiklejohn planned to join) Samuel Sass, op. cit.
10. "Land Deeded to Mellon College." The New York Times, March 27, 1947, p. 32
11. "Building Costs Sound Knell of New Liberal Arts College," The Berkshire Eagle, August 28, 1947
12. (Sass's views on why Mellon pulled out) (Hutchins and Meiklejohn planned to join) Samuel Sass, op. cit.
13. "Hanna Farm Will Be Sold for $75,000", The Springfield Republican, November 9, 1947.
14. Charles A. Nelson (2001). "The Aftermath." Chapter 7 (pp. 95–107) of: Radical Visions: Stringfellow Barr, Scott Buchanan, and Their Efforts on behalf of Education and Politics in the Twentieth Century Bergin and Garvey, Westport, CT. ISBN 0-89789-804-4.
15. (Sale to Maeder) "International Prep School Buys Hanna Place for $60,000; Purchase by Hans K. Maeder Includes Most of Property—Children of U. N. Delegates To Be Among Students." The Berkshire Eagle, May 4, 1948
16. The School that Was, memoir of the Stockbridge School, which occupied the same site from 1949 to 1976.
