= People's Institute =

The People's Institute refers to organizations set up in different localities:

- People's Institute, Manchester
- People's Institute, New York
