= Duck & Goose =

Children's animated series on Apple TV+

- Promotional poster
- Genre: Children's; Animated
- Based on: Duck & Goose by Tad Hills
- Developed by: Jane Startz; Tad Hills; Joe Purdy
- Directed by: Brian Muelhaupt
- Voices of: Connor Andrade; JeCobi Swain; Eden Jacob; Chanel Umoh
- Composers: Starr Parodi; Matthew Janszen
- Country of origin: United States
- Original language: English
- No. of seasons: 2
- No. of episodes: 17

Production
- Executive producers: Jane Startz; Douglas Wood; Chris Prynoski; Shannon Prynoski; Ben Kalina; Antonio Canobbio; Tad Hills
- Running time: 22 minutes
- Production companies: Jane Startz Productions; Titmouse, Inc.

Original release
- Network: Apple TV+
- Release: July 8, 2022 – July 7, 2023

Duck & Goose is an American children's animated television series for Apple TV+. The series is based on the children's New York Times bestselling picture book series of the same name by Tad Hills. The first season was released on July 8, 2022. The second season premiered on July 7, 2023.

== Premise ==
The series follows Duck and Goose, two friends with opposite personalities, and their adventures with animals in the meadow.

== Cast and characters ==
- Connor Andrade as Duck
- JeCobi Swain as Goose
- Eden Jacob as Thistle
- Chanel Umoh as Bluebird
- Bailey Sheetz as Squirrel
- Nevin Kar as Gopher and Beaver
- Lexi Janicek as Rabbit and Bunny
- Levi Spigel as Hawk
- Mykal-Michelle Harris as Skunk
- Quinn Minichino Eakins as Kit the Raccoon and Bear
- Catherine Curry as Porcupine

== Episodes ==
=== Series overview ===
Season	Episodes	Originally released	
Season	Episodes	First released	Last released
1	9	July 8, 2022	June 9, 2023
2	8	July 7, 2023	

=== Season 1 (2022) ===
No. overall	No. in season	Title	Written by	Original release date
1	1	"Find Something Round"	John Loy	July 8, 2022
1	1	"Fuzzy Field"	Douglas Wood	July 8, 2022
A game of tag leads to a curious discovery. Duck and Goose meet up with Thistle and learn about what makes her unique.
2	2	"Go to the Beach"	Melinda LaRose	July 8, 2022
2	2	"Measuring Tree"	Mark Zaslove	July 8, 2022
Duck convinces Goose to take a trip to the beach. The duo find out how much they've grown and a disappointed Duck attempts to grow faster.
3	3	"Fly a Kite"	Mark Zaslove	July 8, 2022
3	3	"Purple Plums"	Denise Downer	July 8, 2022
Duck and Goose learn the value of persistence while trying to build and fly a kite. After picking plums, they face a delivery dilemma.
4	4	"Shiny Rock"	Douglas Wood	July 8, 2022
4	4	"Paint a Picture"	Melinda LaRose	July 8, 2022
On a trip to find the shiniest rock, Duck and Goose discover all of the fun within the forest. A happy accident inspires a special birthday gift for Thistle.
5	5	"Sticky Song"	Mark Zaslove	July 8, 2022
5	5	"Build a Playhouse"	Bernie Ancheta	July 8, 2022
Duck and Goose get a catchy tune stuck in their heads. When a toy goes missing, they learn they have different approaches to tidying up.
6	6	"Sunrise"	Carin Greenberg	July 8, 2022
6	6	"Magic Trick"	Sindy McKay	July 8, 2022
Determined to see their first sunrise, the pals try to stay awake all night. Bluebird's talent for magic motivates Duck and Goose.
7	7	"Go Trick or Treating"	Douglas Wood	July 8, 2022
7	7	"Three-Legged Race"	Carin Greenberg	July 8, 2022
A quest for sweets turns spooky when Duck and Goose catch wind of a local "swamp monster". A race between friends hits an unexpected snag.
8	8	"Snowy Day"	Melinda LaRose	July 8, 2022
8	8	"Flower Bud"	Michael J. Beall	July 8, 2022
Duck and Goose plan for fun in a winter wonderland. The pals work hard to help a lonesome flower bloom in the meadow.
9	9	"When Duck Met Goose"	Melinda LaRose	June 9, 2023
When Thistle gets upset with her new neighbor, Bluebird recalls the bumpy days of Duck and Goose's early friendship.

=== Season 2 (2023) ===
No. overall	No. in season	Title	Written by	Original release date
10	1	"Follow the Leader"	Jacqueline Moody	July 7, 2023
10	1	"Shadows"	Mark Zaslove	July 7, 2023
Duck encourages Goose to step out of his comfort zone. During a game of hide-and-seek, the friends lose sight of their shadows.
11	2	"Thistle's Beach"	Melinda LaRose	July 7, 2023
11	2	"Skunk"	Jeff Goode	July 7, 2023
Hoping to cheer up Thistle, Duck and Goose plan a creative surprise. The duo helps a skunk manage her not-so-charming stink clouds.
12	3	"Moose"	Jacqueline Moody	July 7, 2023
12	3	"Ants"	Mark Zaslove	July 7, 2023
The friends cross paths with a struggling giant. Duck and Goose attempt to save a teeny-tiny community.
13	4	"Dancing Swans"	Carin Greenberg	July 7, 2023
13	4	"Cheer Up Bluebird"	Mark Zaslove	July 7, 2023
Inspired by an elegant trio, Duck and Goose stage a dance performance. The pals try to uplift Bluebird with songs and treats.
14	5	"Dragonfly"	Melinda LaRose	July 7, 2023
14	5	"Granola Bars"	Carina Schulze	July 7, 2023
Duck and Goose help Rabbit see a dragonfly up close. Kindness leads to chaos while making snacks.
15	6	"Thistle's Quest for the Best"	Eric Branscum	July 7, 2023
15	6	"Beaver's Sticks"	Jacob Goldfine	July 7, 2023
Hoping to find her calling, Thistle practices new skills. Duck and Goose set out to return branches to a crafty beaver.
16	7	"Bear"	Mark Zaslove	July 7, 2023
16	7	"Little Raccoons"	Melinda LaRose	July 7, 2023
In the snow, Duck and Goose stumble upon a sleepy local. The friends help Mama Raccoon’s twins embrace their differences.
17	8	"Really Big Rock"	Jacqueline Moody	July 7, 2023
17	8	"Wing-Ding Leaf"	Shane Portman	July 7, 2023
A large rock rolls between Duck and Goose during nap time. The duo embarks on a journey to find a unique treasure.

== Release ==
On May 13, 2022, Apple announced new kids and family programs for Summer 2022, including Duck & Goose. A trailer premiered June 28, 2022, and the first season was released on July 8, 2022. The two-part special season finale, "When Duck Met Goose", was released on June 9, 2023. The second season debuted on July 8, 2023.

== Reception ==
On Rotten Tomatoes, the first season holds a favorable rating, with Polly Conway from Common Sense Media highlighting its "lovely, vibrant animation, sweet songs, and a valuable concept."
