= Ramona Edelin =

American academic and activist (1945–2024)

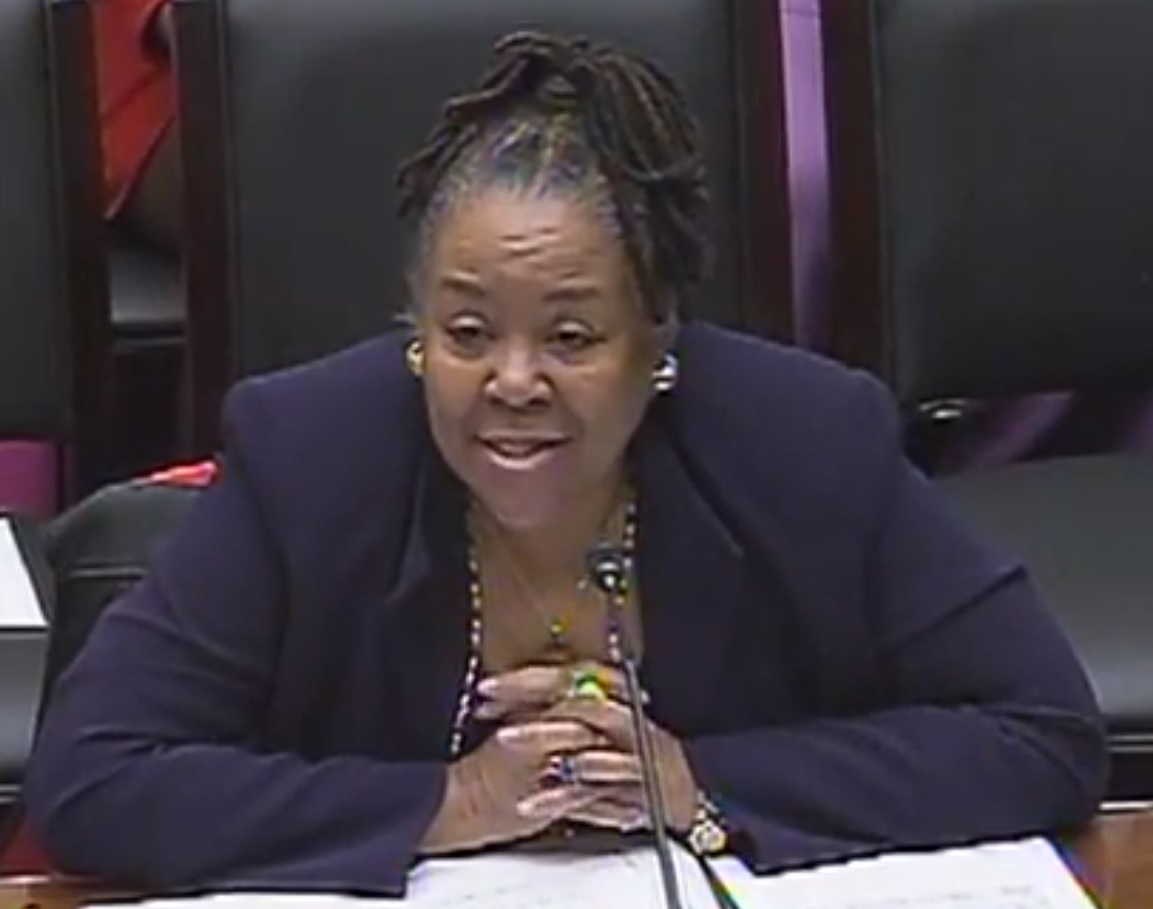
- Edelin testifying at the United States House Committee on Oversight and Reform in 2011
- Born: Ramona Hoage Edelin; September 4, 1945; Los Angeles, California, U.S.
- Died: February 19, 2024 (aged 78); Washington, D.C., U.S.
- Education: Fisk University; University of East Anglia; Boston University
- Mother: Annette Lewis Phinazee

Ramona Hoage Edelin (September 4, 1945 – February 19, 2024) was an American academic, activist and consultant. Edelin is credited with introducing the term "African American" into the general vernacular. She has been named one of the most influential Black Americans by Ebony. She later served as executive director of the DC Association of Charter Schools.

== Early life and education ==
Ramona Hoage was born on September 4, 1945, in Los Angeles, California, to George Hoage and Annette Lewis Hoage Phinazee. She was an only child. Her father died in a motorcycle crash two weeks before she was born. Her mother was the first woman to earn a PhD in library science from Columbia University, and encouraged Ramona to pursue an academic career.

Edelin's family moved to Atlanta, Georgia where she attended Oglethorpe Elementary School. Her family moved again, to Carbondale, Illinois, and she briefly attended Lincoln Junior High School there. Her family then moved to Stockbridge, Massachusetts where Edelin attended Stockbridge High School. She graduated in 1963.

Edelin then attended Fisk University, receiving the Sarah McKim Maloney Award in 1964, participating in the honors program, and placing on the dean's list almost every semester. She became a member of Phi Beta Kappa and the Gold Key Honor Society, edited the Fisk Forum campus newspaper, and was contributing editor to the Fisk Herald student literary magazine. She created one of the first university voluntary honor codes, which students signed to enable taking unmonitored tests. She was voted Miss Sophomore and Miss Alpha Phi Alpha. She also was selected to attend intensive courses at Harvard University the summer before her senior year. She earned her Fisk bachelor's degree magna cum laude in religious and philosophical studies, with departmental honors, in 1967.

In 1967, she married Kenneth Edelin. Kenneth needed to complete a tour of military service in England and Ramona moved there to study as well. She earned her master's degree in philosophy at the University of East Anglia in 1969. In 1981, she completed her PhD in philosophy at Boston University. Her dissertation was on W. E. B. Du Bois.

== Career ==
=== Teaching career ===
Edelin taught at various institutions after completing college in 1969, including the University of Maryland's European Division, Emerson College, Brandeis University, and Northeastern University. At Northeastern, she founded the first African American Studies program under the name of Black studies in 1972, and became department chair when it launched as the Afro-American studies department in 1973. It then changed names to African American studies in 1975. This period in time is when she is also credited with introducing the term "African American" to the academic community.

By 1975, she had separated from her husband, Kenneth Edelin, who was the first Black chief resident in obstetrics and gynecology at Boston City Hospital. He was convicted of manslaughter that year by a Boston jury for a legal abortion which he had performed after Roe v. Wade. The next year, the Massachusetts Supreme Judicial Court reversed the verdict. Ramona spoke out on her husband's behalf to the media, and compared the city's racial violence towards Black children to their anti-abortion sentiments. She also criticized the Catholic Church's stance on abortion law, since many of the jurors on the case were Catholics and men.

=== National Urban Coalition ===
Edelin left Northeastern and started working for the National Urban Coalition in 1977. She joined as executive assistant to the president, and progressed to director of operations, vice president of operations, and senior vice president of program and policy. She specialized in urban issues, and in her last role, she led programs in housing, economic development, health and urban education, and advocacy. She helped develop the "Say YES to a Youngster's Future" program, which was designed to expose Black, Latino, Native American, and female children to math, science, and computer science to prepare them for technology jobs.

In 1988, she met with Jesse Jackson and other Black leaders. During the meeting, Edelin shared the meaning and importance of the term "African American." Shortly thereafter, Jackson began regularly using the term, popularizing it in the American vernacular.

By 1989, Edelin was serving as president and chief executive officer of the National Urban Coalition. She created the M. Carl Holman Leadership Development Institute and the Executive Leadership Program and created landmark education programs for African American children. Edelin was also program chairperson for the African American Summit of 1989, which focused on creating a united agenda for political and economic empowerment for African Americans. Edelin viewed her work as part of the "cultural offensive" to use cultural renewal to empower African Americans politically and economically. She did not think that African Americans had a single group identity, battling "twoness," which was also a concern of W. E. B. Du Bois's. She thought that having a united group identity would help ensure self-sufficiency, highlighting African legacies and enabling rebirth and development.

=== Federal initiatives ===
Edelin joined the board of the Congressional Black Caucus Foundation in 1991. In February 1998, after leaving the National Urban Coalition, she became the Foundation's executive director. That same year, she was appointed by then president Bill Clinton to the Presidential Board on Historically Black Colleges and Universities. She also visited South Africa with Clinton that year.

Edelin left the Congressional Black Caucus Foundation in 2002. She served for one year, starting in 2003, as Vice President, Policy and Outreach of the Corporation for Enterprise Development. She later served as executive director of the DC Association of Charter Schools from 2006 to 2020. When it was succeeded by the D.C. Charter School Alliance, she served as senior advisor to that group. Ariel Johnson, a head of the D.C. Charter School Alliance, applauded Edelin's leadership of the charter school movement, saying that “without her leadership, it’s safe to say that the charter school movement in the United States, and certainly the nation’s capital, would not be where it is today."

=== Board positions ===
Edelin has also been involved in the District of Columbia Humanities Council, a member of the Board of Elders of the African Heritage Institute, and a board of directors member for the Boston Black Repertory Company, WINNERS, The Bridge, and the Association for Better Living. She was also a member of Delta Sigma Theta and Women in Politics.

== Awards and honors ==
In 1975, she earned the Roxbury Action Program Distinguished Service Award, and was named one of the Outstanding Young Women of America.

In 1982, Ebony named her one of their Women to Watch. In 1983, she was selected for the IBM Community Executive Program. She earned the 1986 YWCA Academy of Women Achievers award. In 1989, she earned the Southern Christian Leadership Conference Leadership Award for Progressive Leadership.

Northeastern created the Ramona Edelin Award in her honor, for academic achievement in Africana studies. This is the same department that she founded under a different name.

== Personal life ==
In 1967, she married Kenneth Edelin. The couple had two children together, Kenneth Edelin Jr. and Kimberley Freeman. The couple divorced and Kenneth Sr. died in 2013.

Edelin later had a relationship with Alonzo Speight and had a second son, Ramad Speight.

Edelin resided in Washington, D.C. She died there on February 19, 2024 at the age of 78, from cancer.

== Bibliography ==
Works by Ramona Hoage Edelin

- "Revolutionary Aspects of Acquiring Skills". Atlanta University, Center for African and African-American Studies position paper
- "Kenneth C. Edelin: A Living Sacrifice?" Encore (1975)
- "Has Anyone Read The Crisis of the Negro Intellectual Lately?" Black World (1976)
- "Shirley Graham Du Bois" First World (1977)
- "Role of the African Woman Since Slavery: Culture Bearer" Encore excerpt (1975)
- "Women at Work" coauthor; Wellesley College Center for Research on Women (1978)
- "On the Cultural Offensive" column for Afro-American
- We the Village: Achieving our Collective Greatness Now. Chicago: Third World Press (2014). ISBN 0883783290
