= Stockbridge School =

Coordinates: 42°19′47″N 73°19′57″W

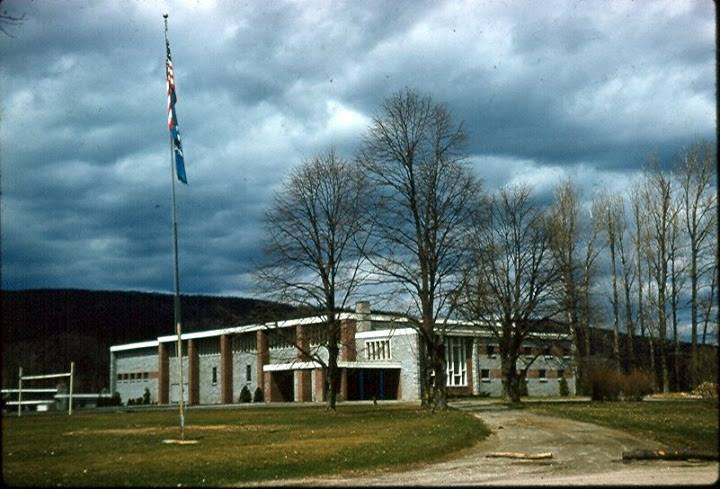
- Stockbridge, Massachusetts; United States

Information
- Type: Progressive private school
- Established: 1948
- Closed: 1976
- Headmaster: Hans Maeder
- Grades: 9-12
- Gender: Co-educational
- Enrollment: 200
- Campus: Rural

Stockbridge School was a progressive co-educational boarding school for adolescents near the Interlaken section of Stockbridge, Massachusetts. It operated from 1948 to 1976.

== History ==
The school was founded by the World War II German refugee Hans Maeder and his American wife Ruth, who paid $60,000 to acquire the 1,100-plus acres of the former Gilded Age estate of Daniel Rhodes Hanna, son of Mark Hanna, businessman and politician. Maeder was a socialist and the couple wanted to establish a school based on egalitarian principles.

At the time of the Maeders' purchase, the property contained 18 buildings and 2,500 feet (760 m) of frontage on the lake known as Stockbridge Bowl. The property had previously been named Bonnie Brier Farm. The Maeders' purchase occurred shortly after the failure of Liberal Arts, Inc. to establish a Great Books-based college associated with St. John's College, Annapolis, Maryland, on the same site.

Only a portion of this extensive, largely forested property, which ranged from the summit of West Stockbridge Mountain to the shore of the Stockbridge Bowl, was developed as the school campus. The Maeders retained title to the remainder of the land at the time of their purchase. Following the school's closure, some of this other property was subdivided for residential development.

== Program ==
The school was unusual for being racially integrated from its inception, as well as for Maeder's successful efforts to recruit an international student body during a period in which many similar schools were comparatively insular and ethnically exclusive.

Beginning in 1948, three years after the United Nations was established, the school flew the United Nations flag just below the United States flag. The credo of the school was stated on a plaque installed at the entrance to a new classroom building in the mid-1950s, "All Men are created equal in dignity and rights".

For some years, the curriculum included a junior year abroad, and Stockbridge briefly operated a branch in Corcelles, Bern, Switzerland. Maeder was a socialist and had egalitarian aspirations, but his school also attracted numerous students from wealthy New York area families. Maeder did a significant amount of student recruitment from an apartment he maintained in midtown Manhattan.

Six days per week, students, whose number never exceeded about 200, were required to assemble after breakfast and listen to 20 minutes of recorded music. Selections were mostly European romantic and classical music, chosen by a very limited number of faculty, who provided brief commentary. On Saturdays, selections were chosen by a student, and were typically popular music.

For a brief period in the 1970s immediately following Maeder's retirement in 1971, and during the directorship of Thomas Newman, the Berkshire Folk Society performed monthly on winter evenings. During this period, visiting artists included Malcolm Cecil, as well as both Joseph Jarman of the Art Ensemble of Chicago and Richard Abrams, each noted for their early connection with the Chicago-based Association for the Advancement of Creative Musicians.

Throughout the school's history, there were frequent gatherings of the student body modeled on the New England town meeting, during which open discussions were held, and votes taken on matters of interest. The school director held veto power over decisions.

Esther Newton, a future anthropologist, had attended the school in 1957. She later wrote in her memoir about the experience: "Stockbridge School was also used as a sort of 'holding tank' for teenagers who, for one reason or another, were living in an unsympathetic environment at home and whose parents could afford to send them away to school. Much of the revenue used to pay for the school came from this source".

== Demise ==
Maeder retired as headmaster of Stockbridge in 1971, and was followed in relatively quick succession by headmasters Thomas Newman and Richard Nurse. The school closed in 1976 largely due to difficult U.S. demographic and economic trends of the era, which resulted in declining enrollment and debt, and the shut-down of many small boarding schools in New England. In the introduction to Gunter Nabel's "A Fight For Human Rights - Documents of The Stockbridge School," alumnus Benjamin Barber is quoted as proposing an additional hypothesis for the school's demise: the then-radical ideals upon which the school was founded in the 1940s, notably racially integrated coeducation, had become mainstream by the 1970s. The school had fulfilled its founder's goals, and therefore was no longer needed.

The campus later became the site of the DeSisto School, an unrelated organization, also now defunct. In April 2009 the DeSisto parcel was sold at auction to Sheehan Health Group (a nursing home concern) for about $1.35 million, while extensive areas to the north and south of the former campus that were previously held by the Maeder family as forest and meadows had been subject to residential subdivision and development.

== Alumni and former staff ==
The alumnus most closely associated with Stockbridge School is Arlo Guthrie, whose arrest for littering by Stockbridge police shortly after graduation in 1965 inspired the song "Alice's Restaurant". Alice Brock had been the school librarian before opening a lunch counter in Stockbridge. Ray Brock, husband of Alice, was a shop teacher at the school.

Other notable alumni include comedian Chevy Chase, comedian and filmmaker [[Christopher Guest]], physician Kenneth C. Edelin (who later taught at the school), political theorist Benjamin Barber, and pioneering electronic music producer Robert Margouleff.

== External links and sources ==
- Pitt, David E. (September 11, 1988). "Hans K. Maeder, Stockbridge Founder, Dies at 78". The New York Times.
- Teacher Education Quarterly, Summer, 2001
- Stockbridge School Web site "Stories" page; introduction to Gunter Nabel's "A Fight For Human Rights - Documents of The Stockbridge School."
- Han Maeder Video 1974
