= Enoch Barton Garey =

American Army officer (1883–1957)

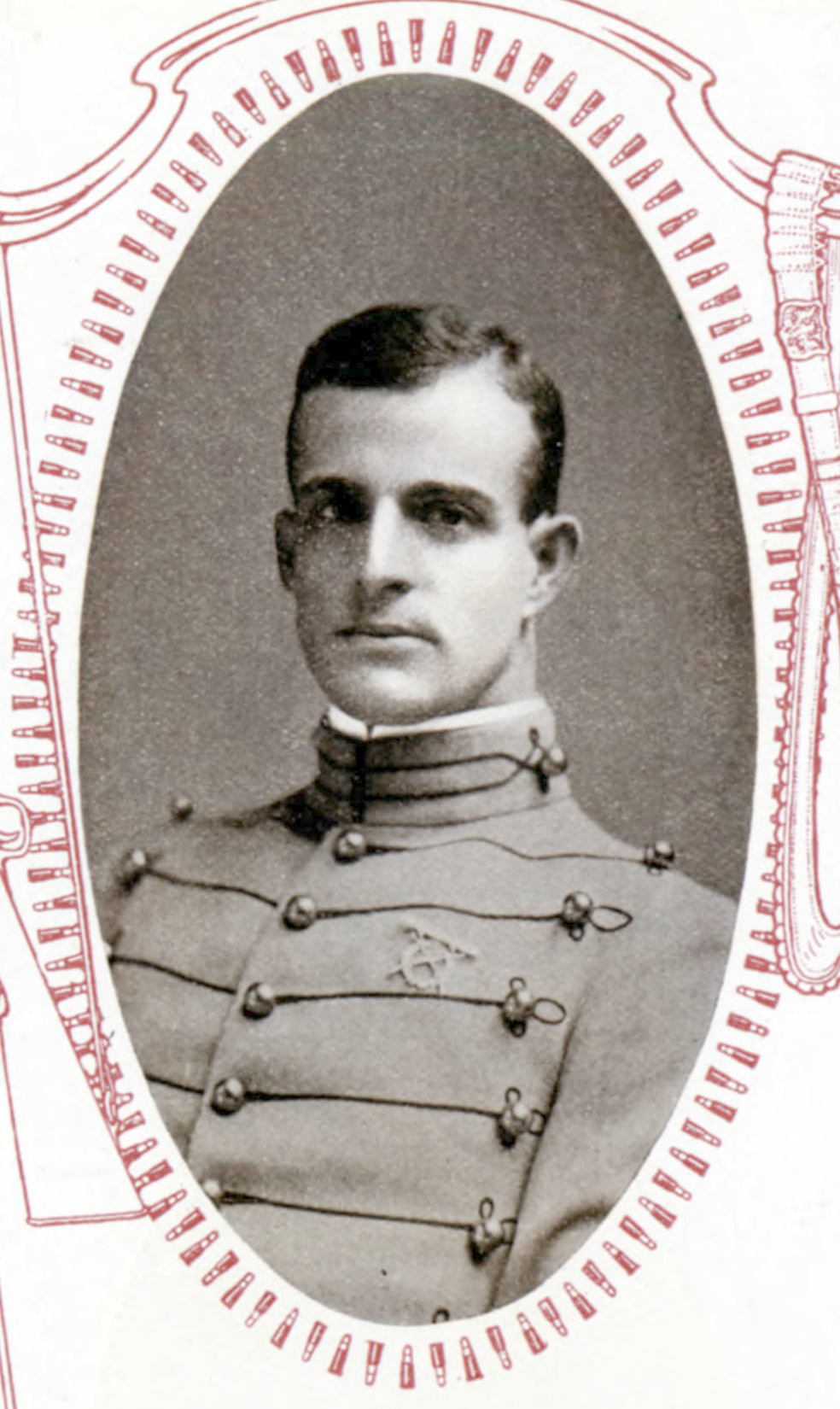
- At West Point in 1908
- Born: August 7, 1883; Caroline County, Maryland
- Died: September 24, 1957 (aged 74); Los Angeles, California
- Education: St. John's College; United States Military Academy
- Occupations: Military Officer, Educator, Author, Police Superintendent
- Spouse(s): Alice Brewer Ross Garey, 1890 - 1980
- Children: Enoch Barton Garey II b. 1916 Albert Ross Garey b. 1917 Arthur Ellis Garey b. 1920 Wilson Saulsbury Garey b. 1922 Alice Ross Garey b. 1924 Stewart Towers Garey b. 1926 Barbara Lyden Garey b. 1932
- Awards: Croix de Guerre, Distinguished Service Cross, Medal of Honor

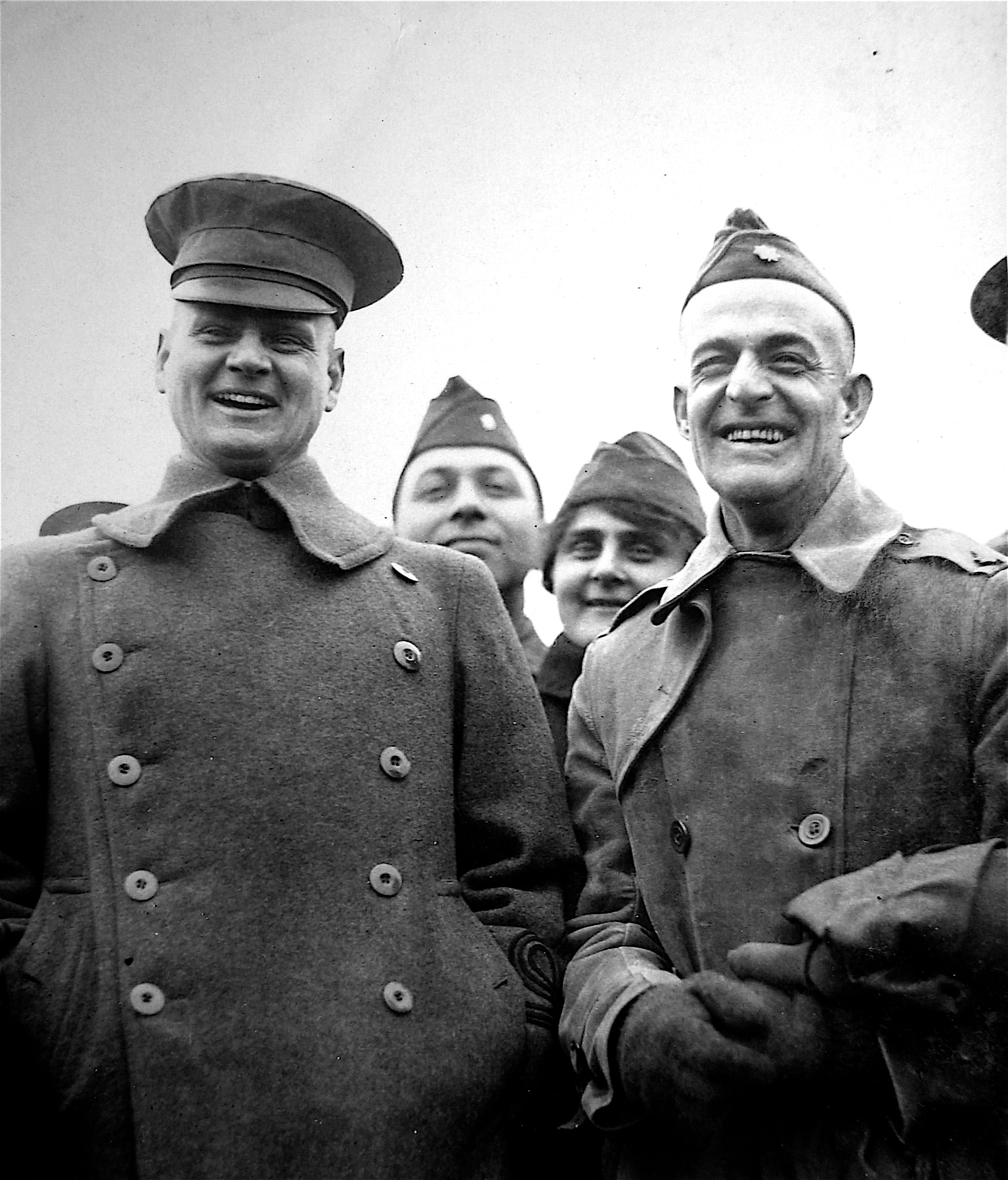
E. B. Garey (right) Just after Armistice, Paris

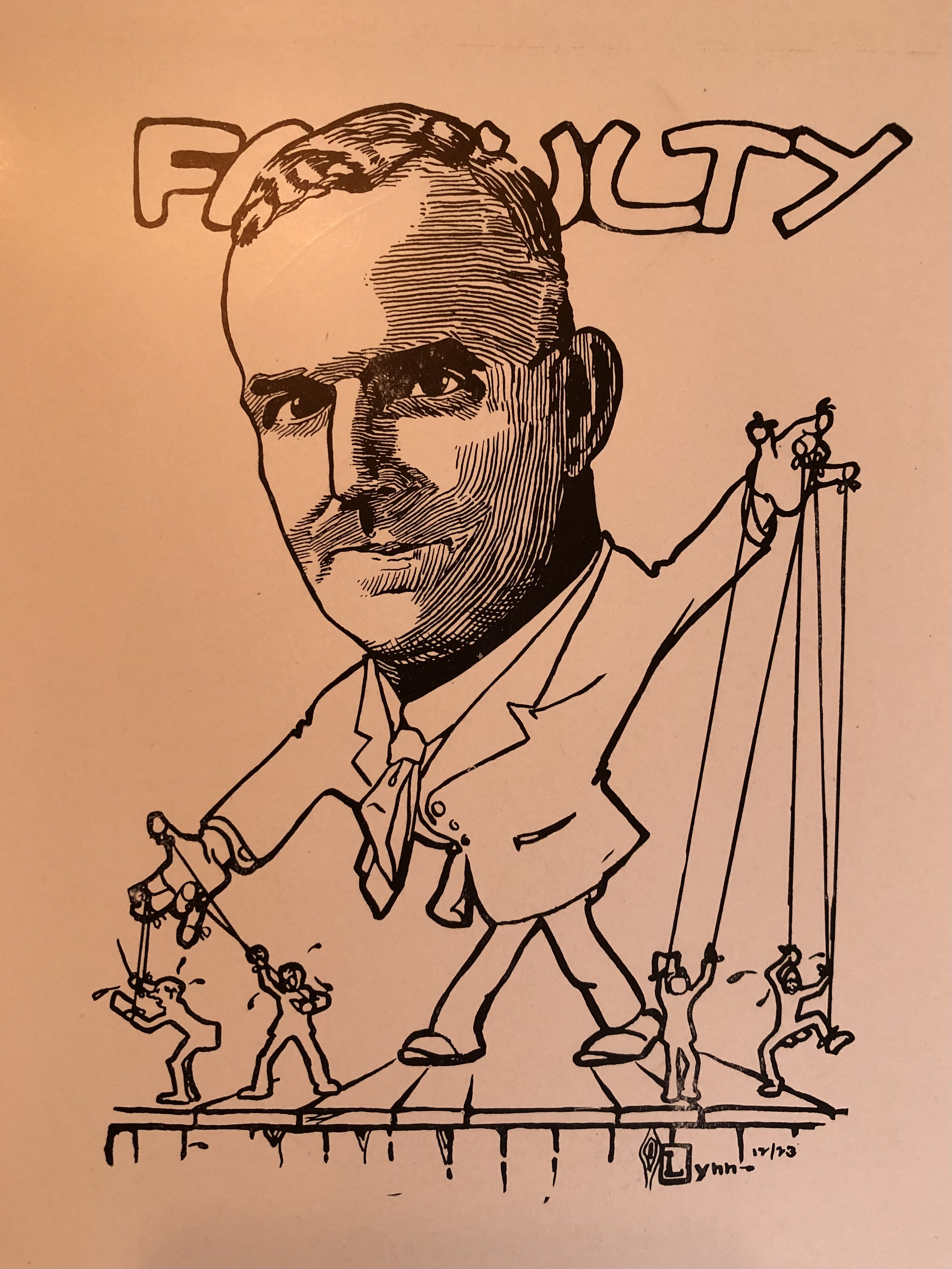
Caricature of E. B. Garey from the yearbook of St. John's College, 1924.

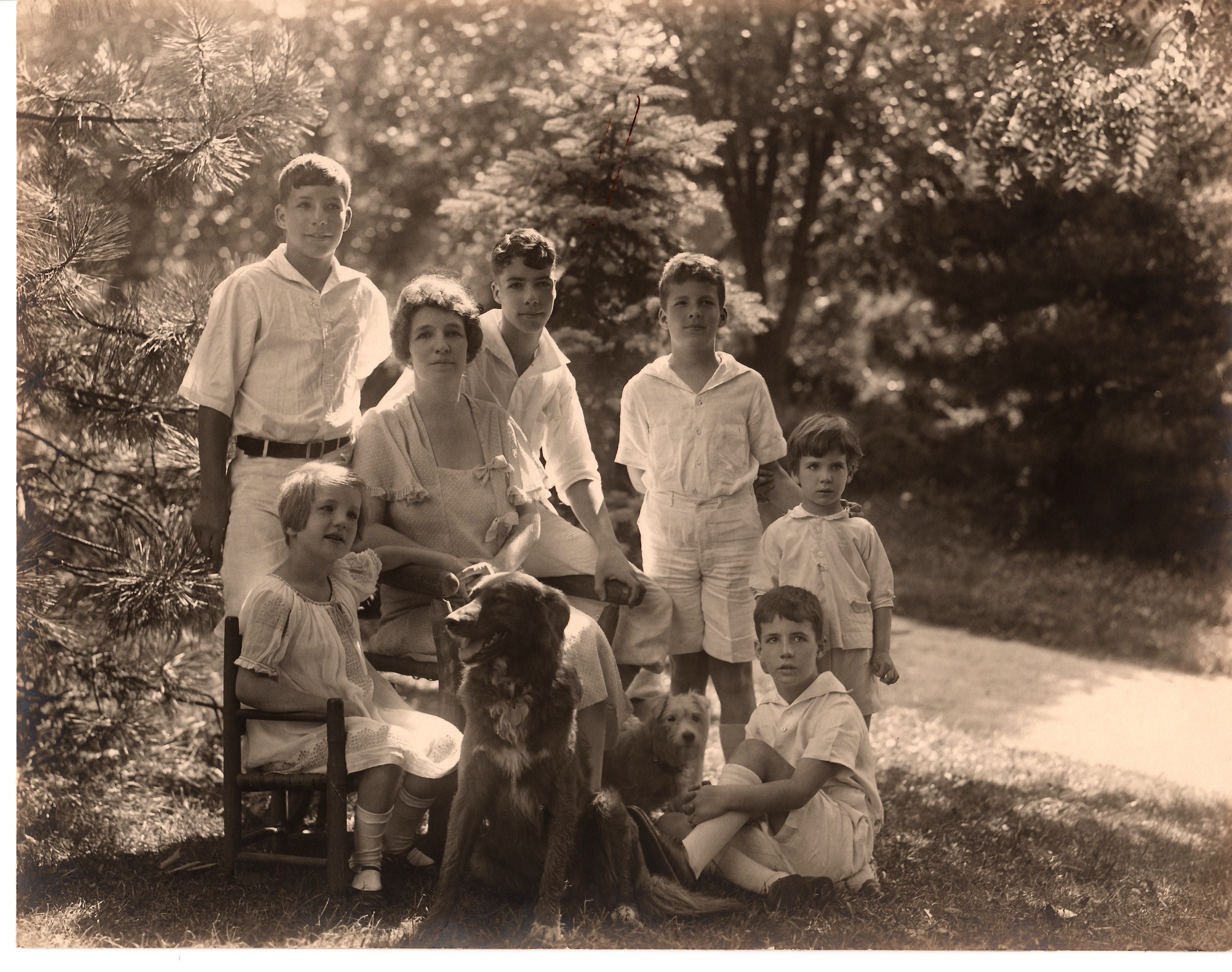
Mrs. E. B. Garey and children, c. 1930

Enoch Barton Garey (August 7, 1883 – September 24, 1957) was a military expert and author of numerous textbooks including The Plattsburg Manual: A Handbook for Federal Training Camps. He was a Maryland native who served as a major in World War I and as superintendent of the Maryland State police.

== Early career ==
Garey was one of six children born on a farm near Tuckahoe Neck, in Caroline County, Maryland. His father Colonel Robert James Wright Garey saw action in the Civil War at Gettysburg. His mother Vashti Saulsbury was an educated woman of Quaker heritage.

Young Garey attended St. John's College in Annapolis, Maryland (class of 1903), and then West Point Military Academy. In the 1907 Army-Navy football game, E. B. Garey was the Quarterback who lead the team to victory. Assigned Second Lieutenant in 1908, Garey was stationed in Tientsin, China, and in Baguio, Philippines. It was in the later that he met his future wife, Alice Brewer Ross, who was traveling with her father Rear Admiral Albert Ross. Immediately following their marriage in 1915, he was ordered to Galveston, Texas where he served as aide-de-camp for General Frederick Funston in the campaign to capture Pancho Villa. He was Commandant of Cadets at The Citadel, Charleston, South Carolina in 1916.

Captain Garey was an early adopter of educational films. In 1917 he was based at Fort Sill, Oklahoma "at the School of Arms and the School of Fire in the making of films to teach the soldiers." It was there that Garey collaborated with Frank and Lillian Gilbreth, the well-known efficiency experts. The two families became life-long friends, and were in competition to see who could first produce a dozen children.

During World War I Major Garey was awarded the Distinguished Service Cross for "extraordinary heroism in action" as well as the French Croix de Guerre. While commanding the 18th Machine Gun Battalion, 6th Division, in the Gerardmer Defensive Sector, France on September 16, 1918, he led a combat patrol that penetrated deep behind enemy lines and returned safely with four prisoners of war. In this action Major Garey collected valuable information while being exposed to machine-gun and grenade fire from a superior number of the enemy. During this period he was temporarily commissioned Lieutenant Colonel.

Major Garey authored half a dozen books, mostly manuals for military personnel. His best-known title, The Plattsburg Manual, at one point earned royalty payments second only to those of Rudyard Kipling. These texts were used in most colleges where military instruction was required. In 1920 he was detailed to serve as Professor of Military Science and Tactics at Johns Hopkins University. He resigned from the army to accept the presidency of St. John's.

== President of St. John's College ==
In 1923 Garey became president of his alma mater, St. John's College in Annapolis, Maryland, narrowing the military scope of the college so students could concentrate on getting a bachelor's degree. He abolished compulsory military training, replacing the cadet corps with a voluntary ROTC. In September 1924 Garey brought the nation's first Naval Reserve program to St. John's as a pilot program to test the scheme for the Navy. (The US Naval Academy in Annapolis would not begin issuing bachelor's degrees until 1933.) Program graduates were appointed as ensigns in the Naval Reserve. This initial program's success was enough to convince the Navy to establish six full-scale NROTC programs at Northwestern, Harvard, Yale, UC Berkeley, the University of Washington and Georgia Institute of Technology in 1926. Thus, the 1924-25 catalog was correct in saying, "This is the only college at which such a unit is maintained. In the future there will be many other colleges having such a course, but St. John's has the honor of being the first." During Garey's presidency the rank of the college rose, as did the enrollment.

== Maryland State Police ==
In 1929, though, Garey left St. John's and the voluntary ROTC program folded. By 1929 the Naval Reserve unit and Department of Naval Science had also disappeared due to lack of interest, despite the longevity of the six regular programs that had succeeded the St. John's College experiment (which all still exist in 2013, albeit with significant historical gaps at Harvard and Yale). After St. John's, Garey became Superintendent of the Maryland State Police. One of his most memorable experiences was on February 8, 1936. He and some other members of his police force attempted to deliver food to the people of Tangier Island during a terrible ice and snow storm. While attempting to deliver the food, fellow Sergeant William V. Hunter got stuck in the frozen ice of Chesapeake Bay and died of frostbite and exposure.

A lighter aspect of the State Police job was a very large Colonial Days pageant which drew a crowd of 50,000 to Annapolis, including President and Mrs. Collidge. One of Garey's roles in this event was to arrest persons who did not dress in colonial costume for the festival. The prisoners could be released from jail by making a charitable contribution.

== The Garey School for Boys ==
By the 1933–1934 academic year Major Garey had established a private, boarding school housed on the 550 acre estate, Oakington, overlooking the Chesapeake Bay near Havre de Grace, Maryland. During summer months this facility became a camp where sailing and equestrian skills were taught. His educational approach was progressive. For example, he favored project-based instruction and championed inclusivity for the disabled. "College board exams will never be a bugaboo for boys trained in this way."

== Active Retirement ==
In 1942 he accepted the position of Assistant to the Manager of the Veterans Administration in Los Angeles, California, a position he held until retirement in 1953. In effect, he was the head of the Veterans Administration during the war as the Pacific Theater drew attention to the West Coast. His five children who had been simultaneously in military service during World War II all chose to settle in Santa Monica near their parents (One daughter was too young to have enlisted.). Enoch Barton Garey served as Civil Defense Warden for the Brentwood neighborhood of Los Angeles in the early 1950s. He died in Los Angeles on September 24, 1957.

== Books Authored by E. B. Garey ==
Ellis, O.O. and E. B. Garey. The Junior Plattsburg Manual. New York: The Century Co., 1917.

Ellis, O.O. and E. B. Garey. The American Guidebook to France and its Battlefields. New York: The Macmillan Company, 1920.

Bond, P. S. and E. B. Garey. Scouting, Patroling and Musketry: A Complete Course of Practical Training for Small Infantry Units. New York: The Army and Navy Journal, Inc., 1922.

Bond, P. S. and E. B. Garey. Infantry Drill Regulations. New York: The Army and Navy Journal, Inc., 1922.

Bond, P. S. and E. B. Garey. The Junior R.O.T.C. Manual: A Textbook for the Junior Reserve Officers Training Corps. Baltimore: The Johns Hopkins Press, 1922.

Bond, P. S. and E. B. Garey. The R.O.T.C. Manual: Freshman Course. Baltimore: The Johns Hopkins Press, 1922.
