= People's Institute, Manchester =

Building in Manchester, England

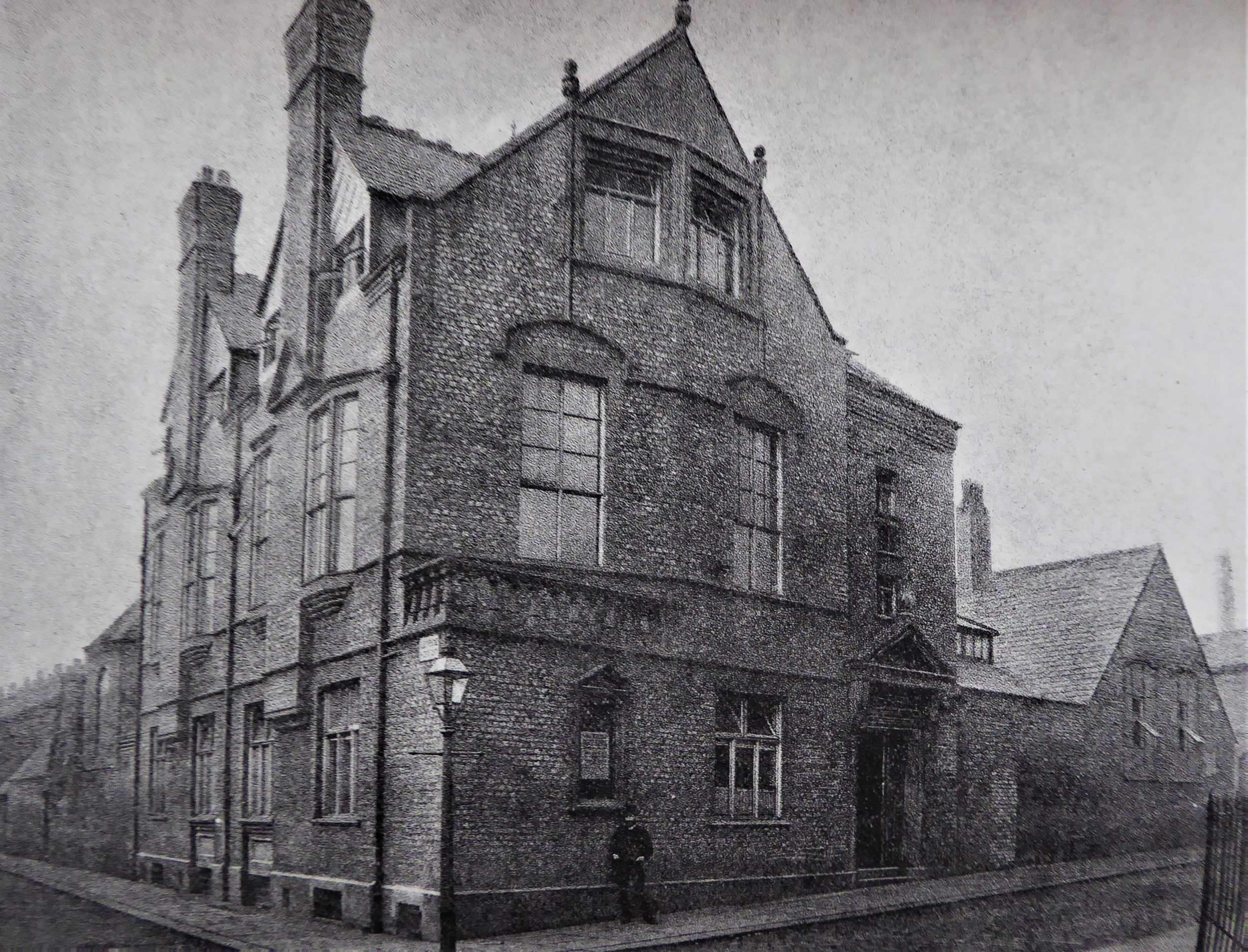
The People's Institute, 1890

The People's Institute was a building in Heyrod Street, Ancoats, Manchester, England. It was a popular meeting place for such groups as the Chartists and Irish confederates.
