= St. John's College (Annapolis/Santa Fe) =

Private liberal arts college in the U.S.

- Former names: King William's School (1696–1784)
- Motto: Facio liberos ex liberis libris libraque
- Motto in English: I make free adults from children by means of books and a balance
- Type: Private liberal arts college
- Established: 1696; 330 years ago (as King William's School); 1784; 242 years ago (St. John's charter)
- Accreditation: MSCHE (Annapolis); HLA (Santa Fe)
- Religious affiliation: Secular
- Endowment: $271.8 million (2024)
- President: Susan Paalman (Annapolis); J. Walter Sterling (Santa Fe)
- Academic staff: ~164 total (both campuses)
- Undergraduates: 775 (both campuses)
- Postgraduates: ~160
- Location: Annapolis, Maryland and Santa Fe, New Mexico, United States; 38°58′57″N 76°29′33″W; 35°40′3″N 105°54′44″W
- Campus: Annapolis: Urban Santa Fe: Urban / Semi-rural
- Colors: Orange
- Mascot: Platypus/Axolotl (Note: According to the website of the Annapolis campus's college bookstore, "Though the College has no mascot, the platypus sometimes fills in, wearing a St. John's College shirt and providing unique company for the students at St. John's." URL accessed 2006-07-27. The Santa Fe campus has soccer, football, and Ultimate Frisbee teams.)
- Website: sjc.edu

St. John's College is a private liberal arts college with campuses in Annapolis, Maryland, and Santa Fe, New Mexico. As the successor institution of King William's School, a preparatory school founded in 1696, St. John's is one of the oldest institutions of higher learning in the United States; the current institution received a collegiate charter in 1784. In 1937, St. John's adopted a Great Books curriculum based on discussion of works from the Western canon of philosophical, religious, historical, mathematical, scientific, and literary works.

The college grants a single bachelor's degree in philosophy, literature, and natural science. Three master's degrees are available through the college's graduate institute: one in liberal arts, which is a modified version of the undergraduate curriculum; one in Eastern Classics, exclusive to the Santa Fe campus, which applies a Great Books curriculum to classic works from India, China, and Japan; and one in Middle Eastern Classics, also exclusive to Santa Fe, which focuses on the Great Books from Jewish and Muslim authors written between the fall of Rome and European Renaissance.

== History ==
=== Old program ===
St. John's College traces its origins to King William's School, founded in 1696. King William's School was founded with an affiliation to the Church of England. In 1784, Maryland chartered St. John's College, which absorbed King William's School when it opened in 1785. The college took up residence in a building known as Bladen's Folly (the current McDowell Hall), which was originally built to be the Maryland governor's mansion but was not completed. There was some association with the Freemasons early in the college's history, leading to speculation that it was named after Saint John the Evangelist. The college's original charter, reflecting the Masonic value of religious tolerance as well as the religious diversity of the founders (which included Presbyterians, Episcopalians, and the Roman Catholic Charles Carroll of Carrollton) stated that "youth of all religious denominations shall be freely and liberally admitted". Later it was thought that the college was named after St John's College, Cambridge. The college always maintained a small size, generally enrolling fewer than 500 men at a time.

In its early years, the college was at least nominally public—the college's founders had envisaged it as the Western Shore branch of a proposed "University of Maryland"—but a lack of enthusiasm from the Maryland General Assembly and its Eastern Shore counterpart, Washington College, made this largely a paper institution. After years of inconsistent funding and litigation, the college accepted a smaller annual grant in lieu of being funded through the state's annual appropriations process. The college closed during the Civil War, and its campus was used as a military hospital. In 1907, it became the undergraduate college of a loosely organized "University of Maryland" that included the professional schools located in Baltimore. By 1920, when Maryland State College (founded in 1857 as Maryland Agricultural College) became the University of Maryland at College Park, St. John's was a free-standing private institution.

The college curriculum has taken various forms throughout its history. It began with a general program of study in the liberal arts, but St. John's was a military school for much of the late 19th century and early 20th century. It ended compulsory military training with Major Enoch Garey's accession as president in 1923. Garey and the Navy instituted a Naval Reserve unit in September 1924, creating the first-ever collegiate Department of Naval Science in the United States. But despite St. John's successfully pioneering the entire NROTC movement, student interest waned, and the voluntary ROTC disappeared in 1926 with Garey's departure. The Naval Reserve unit followed by 1929.

=== New program ===
In 1936, the college lost its accreditation. The Board of Visitors and Governors, faced with dire financial straits caused by the Great Depression, invited educational innovators Stringfellow Barr and Scott Buchanan to make a completely fresh start. They introduced a new program of study, which remains in effect today. Buchanan became dean of the college, while Barr assumed its presidency. In his guide Cool Colleges, Donald Asher writes that the New Program was implemented to save the college from closing: "Several benefactors convinced the college to reject a watered-down curriculum in favor of becoming a very distinctive academic community. Thus this great institution was reborn as a survival measure."

In 1938, Walter Lippman wrote a column praising liberal arts education as a bulwark against fascism and said, "In the future, men will point to St. John's College and say that there was the seed-bed of the American renaissance."

In 1940, national attention was attracted to St. John's by a story in Life entitled "The Classics: At St. John's They Come into Their Own Once More". Classic works unavailable in English translation were translated by faculty members, typed, mimeographed, and bound. They were sold to the general public as well as to students, and by 1941, the St. John's College bookshop was famous as the only source for English translations of works such as Copernicus's De revolutionibus orbium coelestium, St. Augustine's De musica, and Ptolemy's Almagest.

The wartime years were difficult for the all-male St. John's. Enlistment and the draft emptied the college; 15 seniors graduated in 1943, eight in 1945, and three in 1946. From 1940 to 1946, St. John's was repeatedly confronted with threats of its land being seized by the Navy for expansion of the neighboring U.S. Naval Academy, and James Forrestal, Secretary of the Navy, formally announced plans to do so in 1945. At the time, The New York Times, which had expected a legal battle royale comparable to the 1819 Dartmouth case, commented that "although a small college of fewer than 200 students, St. John's has, because of its experimental liberal arts program, received more publicity and been the center of a greater academic controversy than most other colleges in the land. Its best-books program has been attacked and praised by leading educators of the day."

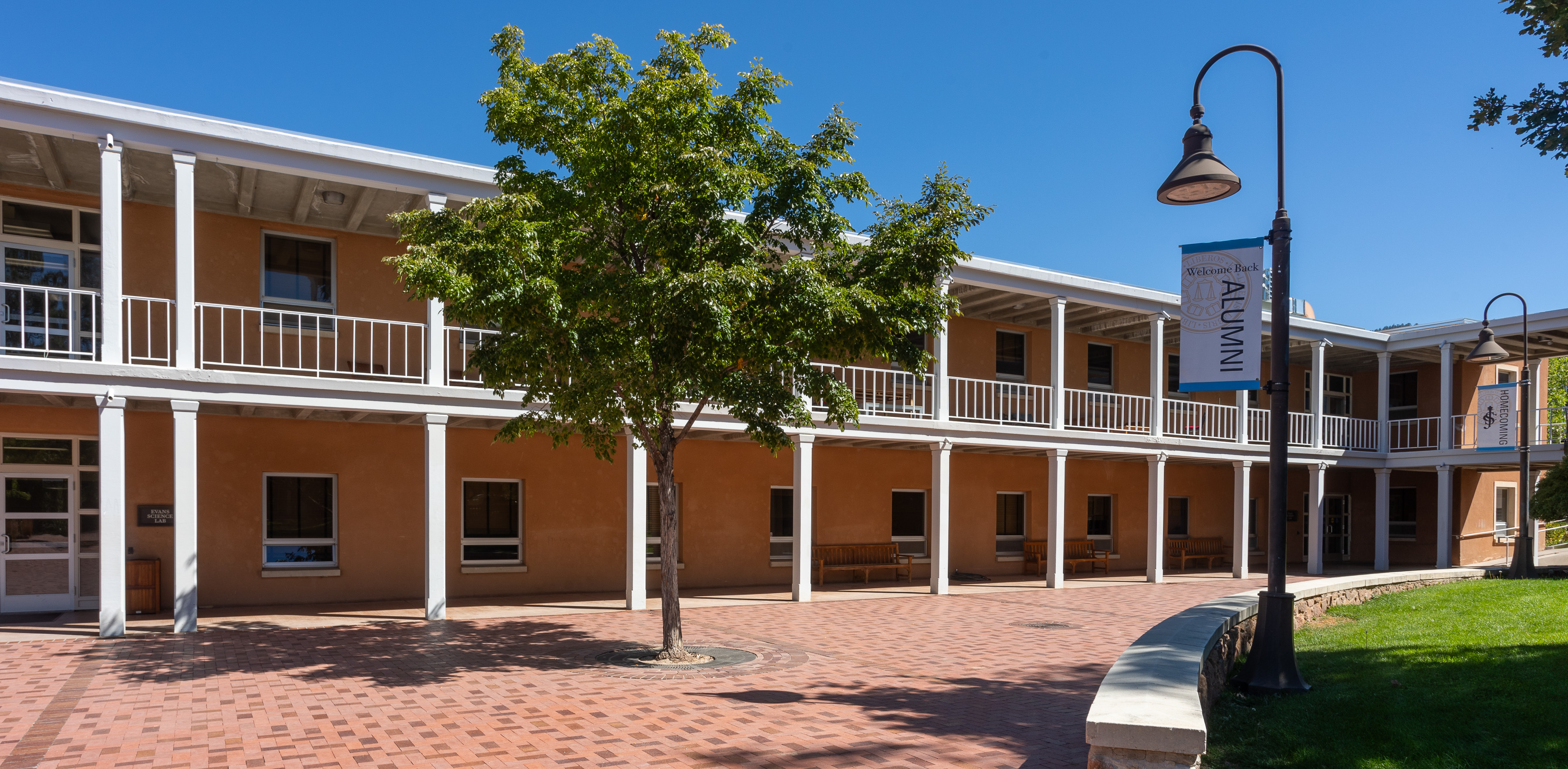
Evans Science Lab, Santa Fe campus

The constant threat of eviction discouraged Stringfellow Barr. In late 1946, Forrestal withdrew the plan to take over St. John's in the face of public opposition and the disapproval of the House Naval Affairs Committee. Still, Barr and Scott Buchanan were already committed to leaving St. John's and launching Liberal Arts, Inc., a new, similar college in Stockbridge, Massachusetts; that project eventually failed—but thinking about other sites for the college eventually led to the opening of St. John's second campus in Santa Fe in 1964.

St John's had been founded as an all-white institution and continued as such in the early years of the New Program, with Barr actively discouraging black students from applying. However, by 1948, faculty and student sentiment had shifted, and students, with the support of the faculty and administration, persuaded a reluctant Board of Visitors and Governors to integrate the college and St. John's became one of the first previously all-white colleges south of the Mason–Dixon line to admit black students voluntarily.

In 1949, Richard D. Weigle became president of St. John's. Following the chaotic and difficult period from 1940 to 1949, Weigle's presidency continued for 31 years, during which time the New Program and the college itself became well established.

In 1951, St. John's became coeducational, admitting women for the first time in its 254-year history. Some students objected because they had not been involved in—nor even aware of—the decision before it was announced to the media, and some believed that the college could not remain a serious institution if it admitted women. Martin Dyer reported that women who were admitted quickly proved they were the academic and intellectual equals of their male counterparts.

As enrollment grew during the 1950s, and facing the coming larger baby-boom generation, thoughts turned again towards opening another campus—but this time in addition to, not instead of, the one in Annapolis. Serious talk of expansion began in 1959 when the father of a student from Monterey, California, suggested to President Weigle that he establish a new campus there. Time ran an article on the college's possible expansion plans, and 32 offers came into the college from New Hampshire, Oregon, Georgia, Alaska, Florida, Connecticut, and other states.

A group from the Monterey Peninsula told Weigle that they were interested, though funding was a problem, and suitable land was a big question. There was also an offer of land in Claremont, California, but competition with the other colleges there for students and financial contributions was a negative. The Riverside Mission Inn (in Riverside, California) was another possibility, but with only 5 acres (2.0 hectares) of land and many renovations needed to the inn, funding was again a significant issue.

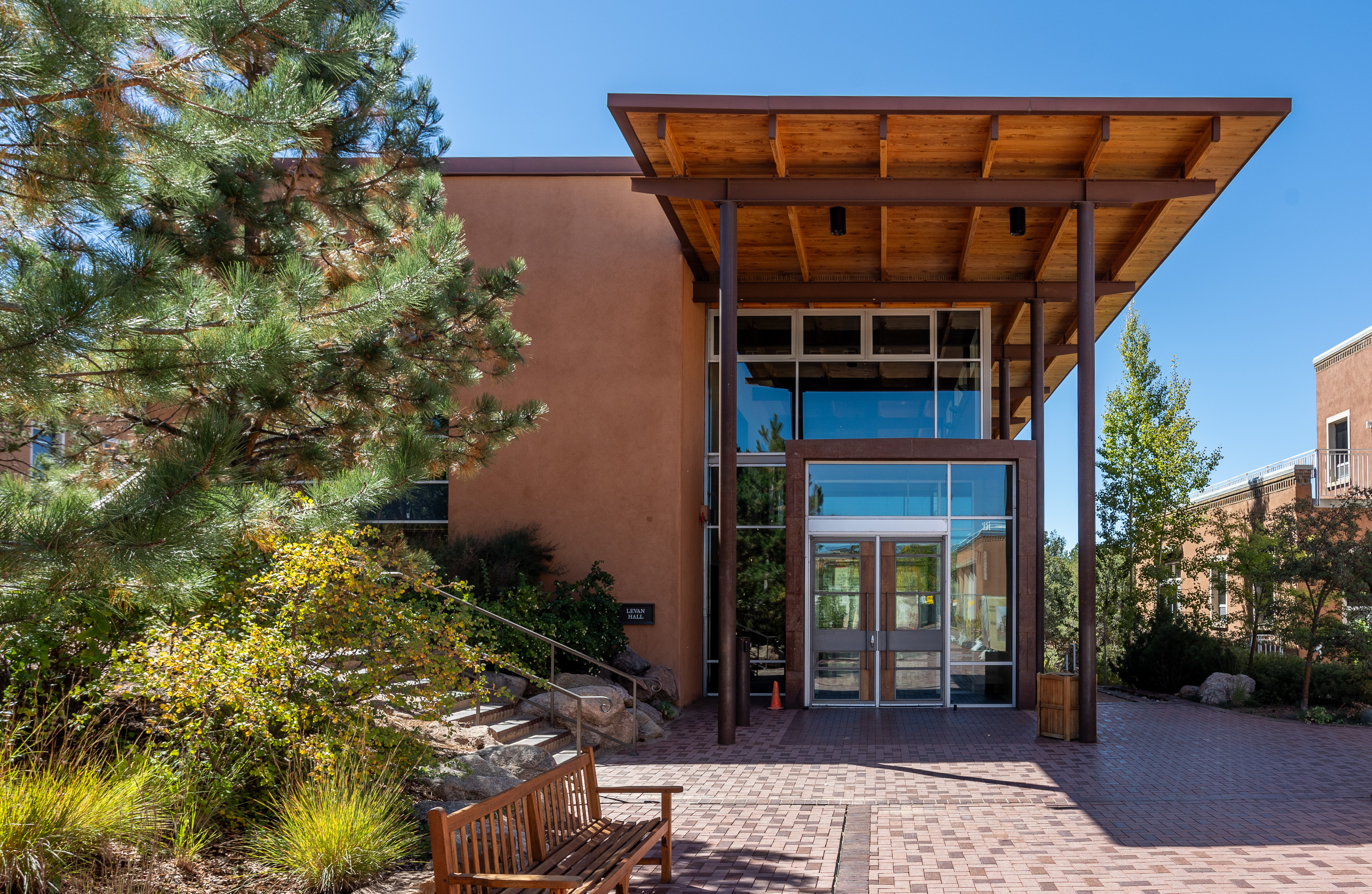
Levan Hall, Santa Fe campus

The three California locations were all still major contenders when Robert McKinney (publisher of The Santa Fe New Mexican and a former SJC board member) called and told Weigle that a group of city leaders had long been looking for another college for Santa Fe. During a lunch Weigle attended at John Gaw Meem's house on the outskirts of Santa Fe in late January 1961, Meem volunteered that he had a little piece of land (214 acres [87 hectares]) that he would gladly donate to the college. After lunch, Weigle looked at the land and instantly fell in love with it. A committee of four faculty members (Robert Bart, Barbara Leonard, Douglas Allanbrook, and William Darkey) later visited the four sites in contention and, after much deliberation, recommended Santa Fe.

In 1961, the governing board of St. John's approved plans to establish a second college at Santa Fe. Groundbreaking occurred on April 22, 1963, and the first classes began in 1964. Immediately afterward, land on the Monterey Peninsula was also donated to the college on the condition that a campus be developed there by a certain date.

== Academics ==
=== Great Books program ===
The Great Books program (often called simply "the Program" or "the New Program" at St. John's) was developed at the University of Chicago by Stringfellow Barr, Scott Buchanan, Robert Hutchins, and Mortimer Adler in the mid-1930s as an alternative form of education to the then rapidly changing undergraduate curriculum. St. John's adopted the Great Books program in 1937 when the college faced financial and academic ruin. The Great Books program in use today was also heavily influenced by Jacob Klein, who was dean of the college in the 1940s and 1950s.

The four-year program of study, nearly all mandatory, requires that students read and discuss the works of many of Western civilization's most prominent contributors to philosophy, theology, mathematics, science, music, poetry, and literature. Tutorials (mathematics, language, and music) and seminar and laboratory are discussion-based. In the mathematics tutorial, students often demonstrate propositions that mathematicians of various ages have laid out. In the language tutorial student translations are presented (ancient Greek is studied in the first two years and French for the last two). The tutorials, with seminars and laboratories, constitute the classes. All classes, particularly the seminar, are considered formal exercises; consequently, students address one another and their teachers by their honorific and last name during class.

St. John's avoids modern textbooks, lectures, and examinations in favor of a series of manuals. While traditional (A to F) grades are given and provided on transcripts, the culture of the school de-emphasizes their importance, and grades are released only at the request of the student. Grading is based largely on class participation and papers. "Tutors", as faculty members are called at the college, play a non-directive role in the classroom, compared to mainstream colleges. However, this varies according to the course and instructor at St. John's. The class size is small on both campuses, with a student-to-tutor ratio of 7:1. The seminar is the largest class, with around 20 students, and is led by two tutors. Daytime tutorials are smaller, typically ranging between 12 and 16 students, and are led by one tutor. Preceptorials are the smallest class size, ranging between 3 and 9 students.

The program involves:

- Four years of literature, philosophy, and political science in seminar
- Four years of mathematics
- Three years of laboratory science
- Four years of language (Ancient Greek, Middle/Early English, and French)
- First-year chorus followed by sophomore-year music

The Great Books are not the only texts used at St. John's. Greek and French classes use supplemental materials that are more like traditional textbooks. Science laboratory and mathematics courses use manuals prepared by faculty members that combine source materials with workbook exercises. For example, the mathematics tutorial combines a 1905 paper by Albert Einstein with exercises that require the student to work through the mathematics used in the paper.

=== Graduate Institute Liberal Arts program ===
The Graduate Institute in Liberal Education was established at St. John's College in 1967 as a summer program on the Santa Fe campus. The size and scope of the Institute have expanded so that currently, both the Annapolis and Santa Fe campuses offer year-round graduate-level study based on the principles of St. John's undergraduate program. Students in the Liberal Arts program explore the persisting questions of human existence by studying classic works of the Western tradition. This program is organized into five semester-long thematic segments: Philosophy and Theology, Politics and Society, Literature, Mathematics and Natural Science, and History. Students earn a Master of Arts in Liberal Arts (MALA) by completing four of these five segments. A common curriculum provides the basis for a shared intellectual community; discussion with fellow students and faculty is the mode of learning inside and outside the classroom. Each semester, students attend a seminar, a tutorial, and a preceptorial, all carried out as small-group discussions under the guidance of St. John's faculty members. These three types of classes are the framework of the distinctive St. John's educational experience.

=== Eastern Classics program ===
At the Santa Fe campus, there is a program offering a Master of Arts in Eastern Classics (MAEC). This program is three semesters long and is designed to be completed in one 12-month period. The impetus for the program came with the recognition that the undergraduate program could not do justice to the Great Books of the three main Asian traditions (India, China and Japan) by trying to squeeze in a few works among so many European masterworks. The MAEC program, therefore, provides a full set of readings in the philosophical, religious, and literary traditions of the three cultures listed above. Thus, students learn Chinese culture by reading not only Confucius, Laozi and Zhuangzi, but also Mencius, Xun Zi, Han Feizi, and Mozi, as well as historical narratives by Sima Qian and the Zuo Zhuan, the later movement of Neo-Confucianism and Zhu Xi, narrative works such as Journey to the West or the Romance of the Three Kingdoms and the great Chinese poets, Li Bai, Wang Wei and Du Fu. This list represents only one-third of the required corpus, which also covers the major teachings and branches of Hinduism and the development of Theravada, Mahayana and Zen Buddhism, as well as such literary masterpieces as the Mahabharata, Shakuntala, The Tale of Genji, The Narrow Road to the Deep North, and others. Students also take a language, either Sanskrit or Classical Chinese.

=== Middle Eastern Classics program ===
The Master of Arts in Middle Eastern Classics (MAMEC) was established in 2025. Like the MAEC, this program is only available through the Santa Fe campus, and is designed to be completed in three semesters. The MAMEC program invites students to engage with works that have influenced both Jewish and Muslim philosophy, science, and literature. Only the fourth degree offered by St. John's College, the aim of Middle Eastern Classics program is shed light onto texts and authors sometimes overlooked in Western curricula, as these important writings have shaped the course of philosophy, religion, and poetry across centuries. The program is an exploration of Middle Eastern texts as living works that are as relevant today as they were centuries ago. While not a complete list, students can expect to encounter the writings of Plato, Aristotle, Plotinus, al-Fārābī, Maimonides, 'Ibn al-'Arabī, and Rūmī, while also reading the Epic of Gilgamesh, Tanakh, and Qur'ān. Students also take a language, either classical Arabic or classical Hebrew.

=== Mitchell Art Museum ===
In 1989, with a generous gift from Elizabeth Myers Mitchell and her husband Carlton Mitchell (a sailor), the college built a campus gallery known as the Elizabeth Myers Mitchell Art Gallery to present museum-quality exhibitions to the greater Annapolis community. In 2014, the gallery achieved national accreditation from the American Alliance of Museums. In 2023, the name was changed to the Elizabeth Myers Mitchell Art Museum to celebrate the accreditation.

=== Undergraduate admissions ===
In 2024, St. John's College accepted 44.3% (Annapolis) or 49.5% (Santa Fe) of undergraduate applicants, with both Annapolis and Santa Fe considered to have "Very High Admission Standards" with "Average Competition". Those enrolled had an average 3.81 (Annapolis) or 3.74 (Santa Fe) high school GPA. The university does not require submission of standardized test scores, but they will be considered when submitted. Those enrolled who submitted test scores had an average 1380 (Annapolis) or 1360 (Santa Fe) SAT score (47% for both locations submitting scores) or an average 30 (Annapolis) or 29 (Santa Fe) ACT score (18% for Annapolis, and 28% for Santa Fe, submitting scores).

=== Rankings ===
In 2024, out of 211 Best National Liberal Arts Colleges, U.S. News & World Report ranked St. John's No.75, No.35 in Best Value Schools, and No.25 in Best Undergraduate Teaching.

== Campuses ==
=== Annapolis campus ===
St. John's is located in the Historic Annapolis district, one block from the Maryland State Capitol building. Its proximity to the United States Naval Academy (across King George Street) has inspired many comparisons to Athens and Sparta. The two schools carry on a spirited rivalry seen in their annual croquet match on the front lawn of St. John's, which has been called by GQ "the purest intercollegiate athletic event in America." As of 2025 St. John's has won 32 of the 41 annual matches. About the Johnnies' commitment to the event, one midshipman commented, "They're out practicing croquet every afternoon! Alabama should take football this seriously."

Construction of McDowell Hall at the center of the campus began in 1742 by Provincial Governor of Maryland Thomas Bladen. Still, it was not completed until after the end of the Colonial period. The 23,000-square-foot historic building underwent improvements in 2017–18. Its Great Hall has seen many college events, from balls feting Generals Lafayette and Washington to the unique St. John's institutions called waltz parties.

Mellon Hall, constructed in 1958, was designed by noted architect Richard Neutra.

==== St. John's College Observatory ====
The observatory facility, located at the top of the Foucault pendulum tower in Mellon Hall, contains two permanently mounted telescopes, a 12" Schmidt–Cassegrain telescope model LX200 and a 16" Newtonian telescope, both made by Meade Instruments. The Foucault Pendulum is at the top of the four-story tower. The pendulum drive magnet is housed within a cast iron cone in the Observatory facility. The magnet is keyed to turn on and off as the pendulum swings by using technology such as a photoresistor that determines the center of the pendulum's swing.

=== Santa Fe campus ===
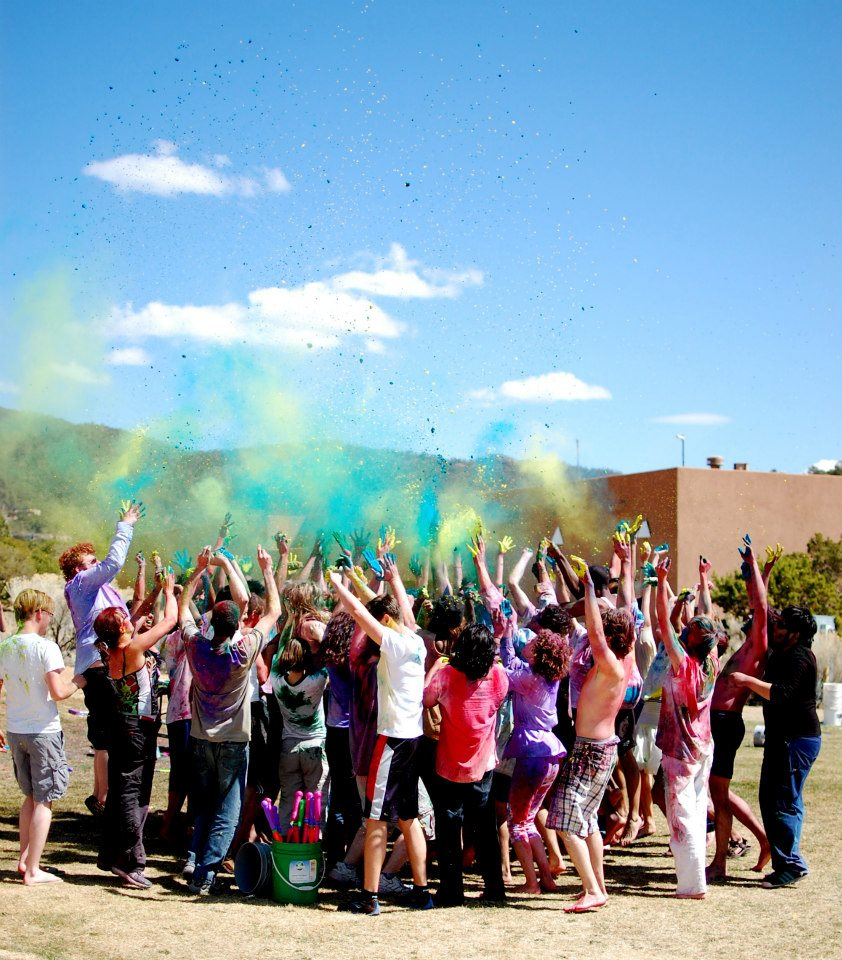
Holi Celebration at Santa Fe Campus

- St. John's College – Santa Fe, New Mexico
- U.S. National Register of Historic Places
- U.S. Historic district
- NM State Register of Cultural Properties
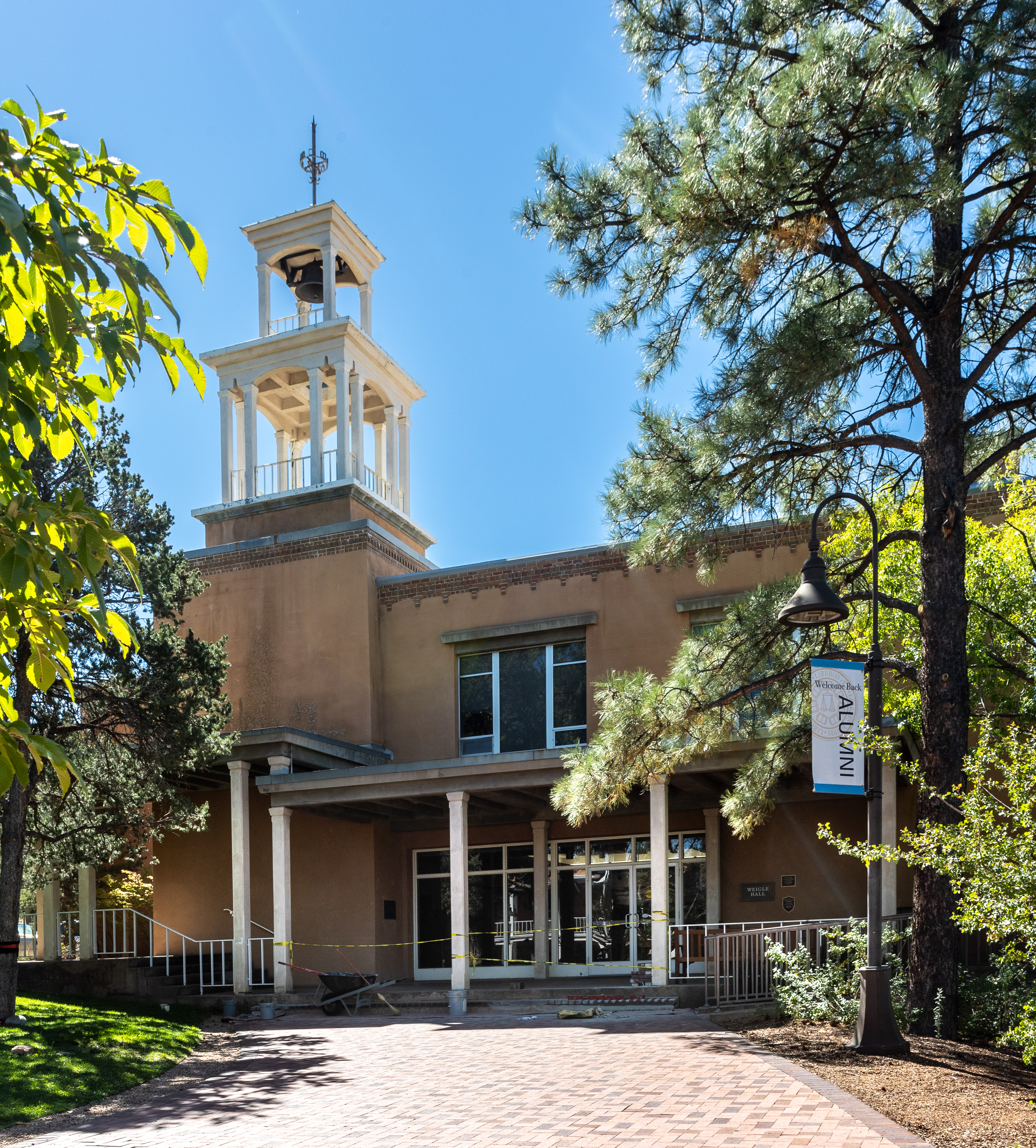
- Weigle Hall, administrative building

- Location within New Mexico Location within the United States
- Location: 1160 Camino Cruz Blanca, Santa Fe, New Mexico
- Coordinates: 35°40′0″N 105°54′45″W
- NRHP reference No.: 15000495
- NMSRCP No.: 2013

Significant dates
- Added to NRHP: August 3, 2015
- Designated NMSRCP: April 10, 2015

St. John's Santa Fe campus is located on the eastern edge of Santa Fe, close to Atalaya Mountain. It was opened in 1964 in response to the increase in qualified applicants at the Annapolis campus. The college chose to open a second campus rather than increase the size of the Annapolis campus. The second campus was part of a larger project to construct six campuses nationwide. St. John's abandoned the concept when it sold a tract of land it owned in Monterey, California.

=== Student body ===
Within the Class of 2022, 36 U.S. states and 15 countries are represented. Approximately 99% of students receive financial aid. First-year undergraduate students range in age from 15 to 65. The student body is relatively small compared to other liberal arts colleges, with a population historically below 500 students on each campus during a year. The average ratio is six students for each professor. The college offers many community seminars and lectures available to the public.

==== Admissions ====
St. John's has been test-optional for 40 years. While the Admissions Committee will assess traditional factors such as academic record, grades, and any test scores provided, it evaluates applicants through admission essays and interviews. In 2023, the college accepted 49.9% of applicants, with those admitted having an average of 3.81 GPA and those submitting test scores having an average 1250–1460 SAT, or average 30-33 ACT, score.

== See also ==
- Colonial Colleges: Details on St. John's antiquity vis-a-vis other old U.S. colleges
- Educational perennialism
- Narrative evaluation
- Western canon
- Santa Fe Institute
- Saint Mary's College of California (Moraga), Integral Program
