= Kenneth C. Edelin =

American gynecologist and supporter of abortion rights

- Born: Kenneth Carlton Edelin; March 31, 1939; Washington, D.C., U.S.
- Died: December 30, 2013 (aged 74); Sarasota, Florida, U.S.
- Education: Stockbridge School; Columbia University (BA, BS); Meharry Medical College (MD)
- Known for: Chairman of the Planned Parenthood Federation of America; Abortion rights advocacy
- Medical career
- Profession: Physician
- Awards: Margaret Sanger Award (2008)

Kenneth Carlton Edelin (March 31, 1939 – December 30, 2013) was an American physician known for his support for abortion rights and his advocacy for indigent patients' rights to healthcare. He was born in Washington, D.C., and died in Sarasota, Florida.

The first black chief resident in obstetrics and gynecology at Boston City Hospital, Edelin was convicted in 1975 of manslaughter after performing a legal, elective abortion there. This followed the legalization of abortion nationwide after the US Supreme Court issued its ruling in Roe v. Wade in 1973.

Edelin was prosecuted by Assistant District Attorney Newman A. Flanagan. Edelin appealed the conviction and was formally acquitted in 1976 in the landmark case by a unanimous vote of the 6-person State Supreme Court.

He served as a professor in the Department of Obstetrics and Gynecology at Boston University, and as its chair from 1979-1989. He had additional academic and community appointments, serving as an advocate for women's health for all classes. For three years, he was President of Planned Parenthood.

In 2008, Edelin received the "Maggie" Award, highest honor of the Planned Parenthood Federation, in tribute to their founder, Margaret Sanger.

== Biography ==
Edelin was the youngest of four children born to Benedict Edelin, a postal worker, and the former Ruby Goodwin. His siblings are Milton, Norma, and Robert (he died in 1982.) They attended racially segregated schools in the Washington, DC area. But Edelin transferred in high school to the Stockbridge School in western Massachusetts, where he graduated in 1957.

After earning a bachelor's degree at Columbia College in 1961, Edelin taught math and science at the Stockbridge School for two years.

He studied at Meharry Medical College in Nashville, where he earned his medical degree in 1967. He served three years in the Air Force, including a hospital internship at Wright-Patterson Air Force Base, and was a captain.

He became a resident at Boston City Hospital in obstetrics and gynecology. In 1973, as chief resident, Edelin performed an elective abortion on an unmarried 17-year-old girl who was six months pregnant. This followed the US Supreme Court ruling that year that abortion was legal and constitutionally protected.

Edelin, who is African American, was prosecuted for manslaughter in 1975 by Assistant District Attorney Newman A. Flanagan. He argued that the fetus was viable and that Edelin had deprived it of oxygen while being "born". The defense experts stated that the fetus was not viable.

Edelin was tried and convicted by a jury. The prosecution used the terms "fetus" and "baby" as if they were the same, and displayed a photo of the dead fetus to the jury. Edelin was sentenced to one year of probation, but could have potentially faced twenty years in prison.

Edelin appealed the verdict to the Massachusetts Supreme Judicial Court the following year. In a unanimous ruling, the conviction was overturned by the six justices, and Edelin was formally acquitted by the Court. The ruling was significant for two reasons. First, it helped to clarify the definition of "life", and it also shielded doctors from criminal prosecution for performing certain abortions.

By this time Edelin had joined the Department of Obstetrics and Gynecology at Boston University, where he served as chair from 1979-1989. In addition, he also served as director of ob-gyn at Boston City Hospital and as managing director of the Roxbury Comprehensive Community Health Center. This provided health care to a large African-American community.

He served as chairman of the Planned Parenthood Federation of America from 1989 to 1992. He was also active with organizations promoting women's health.

== Marriage and family ==
He married Ramona Hoage in 1967, the same year he completed his medical degree. They had a son and daughter, Kenneth Jr. and Kimberly, before getting divorced. In 1978 he married Barbara Evans. They also had a son and daughter, Joseph and Corrine.

== Legacy ==
- His case was the subject of a book by William C. Nolen, The Baby in the Bottle (1978)
- Mark Eichman's play about the case, As to the Meaning of Words (1981), was produced in New York City.
- Edelin published a memoir, Broken Justice: A True Story of Race, Sex and Revenge in a Boston Courtroom (2007).
