= Manuel Alvar =

Spanish linguist, historian (1923–2001)

- Born: 8 July 1923; Benicarló (Castellón), Spain
- Died: 13 August 2001 (aged 78); Madrid, Spain
- Resting place: Chinchón, Spain
- Education: Universidad de Zaragoza (transferred to Universidad de Salamanca after his second year); Universidad de Salamanca
- Occupations: Linguist; historian
- Employers: Universidad Complutense de Madrid; Universidad de Granada; Universidad Autónoma de Madrid
- Known for: Spanish dialectologist, Romance language specialist, historian, university professor
- Spouse: Elena Ezquerra
- Children: 7
- Honours: Doctor Honoris Causa (University of Granada, University of Valencia, University of Zaragoza, University of Salamanca, University of Sevilla, Universidades Nacional de San Juan, Universidad de Buenos Aires); Honorary Professor (Universidad de San Marcos de Lima, Universidad Austral de Chile); Distinguished Professor (University of California Santa Barbara, State University of New York Albany)

Seat T of the Real Academia Española
- In office 7 December 1975 – 13 August 2001
- Preceded by: Carlos Clavería Lizana
- Succeeded by: Arturo Pérez-Reverte

Director of the Real Academia Española
- In office 1 December 1988 – December 1991
- Preceded by: Rafael Lapesa
- Succeeded by: Fernando Lázaro Carreter

Manuel Alvar (July 8, 1923 – August 13, 2001) was a Spanish linguist, historian, and university professor who specialized in the study of dialectology and philology of the Spanish language. Throughout his career, Alvar oversaw and influenced the creation of many Spanish linguistic atlases; maps which recorded speech variations in a given geographical area. He served as Director of the Real Academia Española for four years and was a member of language academies throughout Europe and Latin America.

== Early life and education ==
Manuel Alvar was born on July 8, 1923, in Benicarló, Castellón de la Plana, Spain. He began his studies at the Universidad de Zaragoza, where he was a student of José Manuel Blecua, a renowned Spanish philologist. Alvar transferred to the Universidad de Salamanca and graduated from there in 1945 with the highest honors, with a degree in Philosophy and Spanish Literature. Just three years later, Alvar received his doctorate from the Universidad de Madrid. His primary teaching position was at the Universidad Autónoma de Madrid.

Alvar married historian Elena Ezquerra and together they had seven sons, many of whom are likewise academics and linguistically inclined—one is a lexicographer and university linguistics professor; another teaches Romance language philology; a third teaches Latin philology.

Alvar lost his battle to lung cancer in August 2001, at the age of 78. He is buried in Chinchón, a small town southeast of Madrid.

== Professional work ==
=== Fieldwork ===
Alvar's research provides sociohistorical context of Spanish dialect diversification, outlined in his Manual de dialectología hispánica (1996). His studies cover Spanish dialect variants in his native country (especially in Andalucía, the Canary Islands, Navarra and Aragón regions), as well as Spanish dialects in the United States, South and Central America. Alvar's study of Spanish in the Aragón region includes an in-depth historical background, development of orthography over time, personal names, and variation in syntax, morphology, and phonology, published in his 1953 work El Dialecto Aragonés.

For Alvar's later publication, "Atlas lingüístico y etnográfico de Aragón" (1979-1983), he and his team transcribed words pronounced in isolation, elicited from residents of the Aragón region. He used a similar method to elicit data from people living in the Canary Islands and published a linguistic atlas of this dialect in 1975. Alvar was a strong proponent of smaller linguistic atlases focusing on regional variation rather than larger national atlases—his Atlas Lingüístico de España y Portugal reflects this preference, though that atlas began more than 30 years ago with the fieldwork still not complete. Alvar has also been criticized for using overly traditional field methods in his dialectology studies, for example focusing on forms in isolation rather than in context, or leaving out morphosyntactic variables.

=== Teaching ===
Alvar spent much of his professional life teaching. He began his teaching career in 1947 at the University of Salamanca as an adjunct professor. In 1948 he became chair of the department of Spanish languages at the University of Granada. Alvar also taught at the Autonomous University of Madrid and Universidad Complutense, securing chair positions at both universities in 1968 and 1971, respectively. He served as director of a program teaching Spanish language and culture to foreigners in Málaga from 1965 to 1968, and was known for his passion for teaching Spanish as a foreign language throughout his life. In 1966, Alvar developed an advanced Spanish philology course at the Spanish National Research Council (CSIC), leading it until 1997.

He served as a visiting professor at universities in his native Spain as well as many foreign universities, and was nominated for awards at several universities in North and South America, as well as Europe.

=== Membership in language academies ===
Alvar served as a member of several prestigious language academies. He served as Director of the Real Academia Española from 1988 until 1991. The Academy, based in Madrid, is the official royal institution responsible for overseeing the Spanish language. Alvar was also a member of the Academia Colombiana de la Lengua (specializing in the use of Spanish in Colombia and counseling the Colombian government in language affairs and regulations), la Academia Argentina de Letras (which is closely affiliated with the Royal Spanish Academy as a member of the Association of Spanish Language Academies), and la Academia Mexicana de la Lengua (likewise dedicated to the conservation and purity of the Spanish language as well as increasing the study of Spanish, according to its stated objectives). Alvar was also a member of several historical and cultural academies, including the Real Academia de la Historia, appointed to serve as director in 1999 (replacing Luis Díez del Corral). The Academia studies history "ancient and modern, political, civil, ecclesiastical, military, scientific, of letters and arts, of civilization, and of the culture of the Spanish people." Beginning in 1963, Alvar also served as director of the CSIC Department of Linguistic Geography and Dialectology, Spain's largest public institution dedicated to Spanish language research.

== Legacy ==
=== Influence ===
He was the principal investigator along with the University of Wisconsin in developing the Spanish Medieval Dictionary in 1978. In dialectology Alvar wrote, directed, or coordinated the development of many linguistic atlases and Spanish-language research published in Spain and Latin America during the second half of the 20th century, including the Atlas Lingüístico y Etnográfico de Andalucía (ALEA), the Atlas Lingüístico de España y Portugal (ALEP), the Atlas Lingüístico de Castilla y León (ALCyL), and the Linguistic and Ethnographical Atlas of Argentina (AleCuyo). Alvar served as a member of the Executive Committee of the Atlas Linguarum Europae (ALE) in Holland in 1971, a linguistic atlas supported by UNESCO which includes Altaic languages, Basque, Indo-European languages, Ibero-Caucasian languages, Semitic languages and Uralic languages. Forty-seven national committees and four minority language committees worked on this atlas. Other important atlases Alvar has worked on include an Atlas Lingüístico de Andalucía (1957–1959).

In his work on Spanish in the United States, he worked closely with the Comité Conjunto Hispano-Norteamericano to develop an atlas there, and in 1991 produced one of the most comprehensive atlases of the Latin America, Atlas Lingüístico de Hispanoamérica.

=== Controversy ===
Alvar has been criticized by his contemporaries for an overly nationalistic and colonialist viewpoint on the Spanish language. In his final year as director of the Real Academia Española, Alvar responded harshly to the European Commission (an institution of the European Union) after it requested that Spain revoke its law that all typewriters, computers and printers sold domestically include the tilde, a Spanish diacritical mark. Alvar declared that "[T]he tilde is our tradition and our identity." He also received criticism for a statement he made in 1991 about indigenous languages, stating, "Mexico knew better than anybody else the value of having a language that unifies, that liberates the indigenous communities from their backwardness and misery...the path to freedom runs through hispanization."

=== Awards and recognition ===
Manuel Alvar received many prestigious awards during his life, and after his death has been honored with awards given in his name. He lectured throughout the world, and received numerous degrees honoris causa.

Beginning in 1991 he was appointed member of the Colegio Libre de Eméritos at the University of Madrid. Alvar won the coveted Premio Nacional de Literatura in 1976 for his work in sociolinguistics and linguistic geography, and presided over the Fifth International Congress of Linguistic Studies in the Mediterranean (Málaga, 1973). Alvar received a Fulbright grant for his work on "Atlas de los marineros peninsulares." He received the coveted Premio Nacional de Investigación (awarded by Spanish National Research Council) for his 1960 publication "Estructura del léxico andaluz" and the Premio Nacional de Literatura por Aragón in 1976. The Institución Fernando el Católico created a position entitled "Manuel Alvar Chair of the Linguistics Department" in his honor in 1985, while the National University of San Juan (Argentina) created the "Instituto de Filología Manuel Alvar" in 1992, in recognition of his work . The Fundación José Manuel Lara (in Seville) grants an award for excellence in the humanities each year in Alvar's name, beginning in 1993.

== Major publications ==
Manuel Alvar published works in more than 170 books and 600 scientific articles throughout his lifetime, below are listed some of his most-cited works.

- 1947: "Dialectical Boundaries in the Pyrenees"
- 1953: "El dialecto aragonés" (The Aragon dialect)
- 1960: Texto hispánicos dialectales (Text of Spanish Dialects)
- 1961: Atlas lingüístico y etnográfico de Andalucia (Linguistic and Ethnographic Atlas of Andalusia)
- 1969: Variedad y unidad del español (Variety and Uniformity of Spanish)
- 1976: "El dialecto riojano" (The Rioja dialect)
- 1977: Estudios lingüísticos sobre la Amazona colombiana (Linguistic Studies of the Colombian Amazon)
- 1996: Manual de dialectología hispánica: el español de América (Manual of Spanish Dialectology: the Spanish of the Americas)
- 1996: Manual de dialectologia hispánica: el español de España (Manual of Spanish Dialectology: the Spanish of Spain)
