= Eulalio =

Eulalio is a given name. Notable people with the given name include:

- Eulalio Avila (born 1941), Mexican basketball player
- Eulalio Ferrer (1921–2009), Spanish-Mexican entrepreneur
- Eulalio García (born 1951), Spanish cyclist
- Eulalio González (1921–2003), Mexican actor, humorist, singer-songwriter, screenwriter, announcer, film director, and film producer
- Eulalio Gutiérrez (1881–1939), Mexican general
- Eulalio Tordil (born 1953), spree killer who murdered three people in Maryland
