= Menéndez Pelayo International Prize =

The Menéndez Pelayo International Prize has been awarded since 1987 by the Menéndez Pelayo International University (UIMP) with the objective of honoring those persons whose literary or scientific work has a humanistic orientation and application, in the tradition of the University's namesake Marcelino Menéndez y Pelayo. It was established with the generous support of Eulalio Ferrer, a Spanish-Mexican entrepreneur and academician. Citizens of any Spanish- or Portuguese-speaking country are eligible. Nominations for the prize are made by universities and academies, as well as other organizations involved in the literary, humanistic or scientific cultures of those countries. The panel of judges is composed of the following persons:

- The rector of UIMP.
- Three former rectors of UIMP.
- One person designated by the Royal Spanish Academy.
- The Director General for Cultural & Scientific Relations of the Spanish Agency for International Development Cooperation (AECID).
- The President of the Santillana Foundation.
- The President of the Cervantes Foundation of Mexico. (until 2009, Eulalio Ferrer, or someone designated by him)
- The rector of a Latin-American university, chosen by vote among themselves.
- The previous year's prize winner.

== List of Winners ==
- Octavio Paz (1987)
- Emilio García Gómez (1988)
- Julio Caro Baroja (1989)
- Martí de Riquer i Morera (1990)
- Pedro Laín Entralgo (1991)
- Carlos Fuentes (1992)
- José Manuel Blecua Teijeiro (1993)
- Fernando Lázaro Carreter (1994)
- José Luis Martínez Rodríguez (1995)
- Luis Díez del Corral (1996)
- Ernesto Sábato (1997)
- Francisco Rico Manrique (1998)
- Mario Vargas Llosa (1999)
- José María Jover (2000)
- Miguel León-Portilla (2001)
- Julián Marías (2002)
- Nélida Piñon (2003)
- Emilio Lledó (2004)
- Mario Benedetti (2005)
- Eduardo García de Enterría (2006)
- Belisario Betancur (2007)
- Victoria Camps (2008)
- Margit Frenk (2009)
- José Luis Sampedro (2010)
- Víctor García de la Concha (2011)
- Ernesto de la Peña (2012)
- Ciriaco Morón Arroyo (2013)
- Pedro Cerezo Galán (2014)
- Manuel Seco (2015)
- Miguel Ángel Garrido (2016)
- Juan Velarde Fuertes (2017)
- Aurora Egido (2018)
- Ruy Pérez Tamayo (2020)
- Concepción Company (2021)
- Álvaro Pombo (2022)
