= Clara Janés =

Spanish poet and translator

The Most Excellent Clara Janés
- Born: Clara Janés Nadal; 6 November 1940 (age 85); Barcelona, Spain
- Education: University of Barcelona; University of Pamplona; University of Paris
- Occupation: Poet
- Writing career
- Language: Spanish
- Notable works: Isla del suicidio Tentativa de encuentro y tentativa de olvido Vivir; Rosas de fuego
- Notable awards: Premio Nacional a la obra de un traductor Premio Ciudad de Barcelona de Poesía; Premio Internacional de Poesía Ciudad de Melilla

Seat U of the Real Academia Española
- Incumbent
- Assumed office 12 June 2016 (Note: Elected on 7 May 2015)
- Preceded by: Eduardo García de Enterría

Clara Janés Nadal, born in Barcelona (6 November 1940), is a Spanish writer of several literary genres. She is recognised as a poet and is distinguished as a translator of different central European and eastern languages. Since 2015, she has occupied a seat in the Real Academia Española, becoming the tenth woman elected as a member of the RAE.

== Biography ==
Clara Janés was born in Barcelona on 6 November 1940, the daughter of Ester Nadal and the famous editor and poet Josep Janés (l'Hospitalet de Llobregat, 1913 – Monós, Alto Penedés, 1959). She was brought up in Pedralbes, on the outskirts of Barcelona. Her love for literature, especially poetry, started at an early age after reading several verses of Saint Teresa of Jesus.

In 1957, she began her degree in philosophy at the University of Barcelona, where Professor Jose Manuel Blecua taught her the literature of San Juan de la Cruz and Francisco de Quevedo, among other traditional literature poets. This has been the fundamental influence of her interest in traditional poetry. After the death of her father in 1960, she moved to Pamplona, where she finished her university degree. Clara Janés completed her studies at the University of Paris [2], where she studied Maîtrise in comparative literature. At the age of 23, the author Gerardo Diego [3], who was her mother's friend, read one of her poems. The author also enabled her to publish her first book, Las estrellas vencidas, in 1964. That same year, she decided to move to Madrid, where she currently resides.
Clara Janés confesses that her world changed when she read Night with Hamlet, by the Czech author Vladimír Holan. The author later agreed to meet her in Prague, where she decided to learn Czech and began to translate it.
Since 1983, Clara Janés has participated in national and international literary events. Her poetry has been translated into twenty languages. She directs the Collection Poesía del Oriente y del Mediterráneo, in which she has published works of poets such as Yunus Emre, Sohrab Sepehri, Adonis, Halas, Vladimir Holan, Nezval, Orten, Jaroslav Seifert, Ilhan Berk, Rumi, Odysseas Elytis, António Ramos Rosa, Wang Wei, Nazim Hikmet, Nichita Stănescu, Du Fu, Johannes Bobrowski, Hafez of Shiraz, Halladch Mansur Mahmud Darwish, Sujata Bhatt, Forugh Farrokhzad, Ahmad Shamloo, Abbas Kiarostami, Al-Mutanabbi, Sappho, and Rilke.
Since 7 May 2015, she has occupied the U seat in the Royal Spanish Academy, which was left vacant after the death of Eduardo García de Enterria (16 September 2013). In 2019, she was a contributor to A New Divan: A Lyrical Dialogue Between East and West (Gingko Library, 2019).

Clara Janés is the tenth woman to be elected as a member of the RAE.

== Literature ==
Clara Janés contributes to the literary fields of poetry, novel, biography and essay. Additionally, she is distinguished as a translator, particularly of the Czech language and the poetry of Vladimir Holan and Jaroslav Seifert. She has also translated into Spanish the works of Marguerite Duras, Nathalie Sarraute, Katherine Mansfield, and William Golding, and in collaboration with native people of Turkish and Persian descent, she has translated both modern and ancient myths.

The Hispanic Biruté Ciplijauskaité describes the author as a significant example of the evolution of women in Spanish literature.

The book Kampa (1989) places Clara Janés among the great poets that have addressed the issue of the literature autonomasia, love (Rosa Chacel, 1989).

It is complicated to categorise Clara Janés within a particular literary movement of the late twentieth century. Several critics claim that part of her work could be encompassed into the literary movement of the "novisimos", although she does not form part of it. (Sharon Kafee Ugalde, 2012). The poet uses her own style and language in her work.

Clara Janés is considered a mediator between the Eastern and Western world (Debra Fazer-McMahon, 2010). "The intention of the poet to break down barriers between the Eastern and Western cultures is reflected in the historical context of the Islamic presence in Spain and the present arrival of Muslim immigrants in Spain and other countries of the European Union" ( Kafee Sharon Ugalde, 2012).

Part of her work has been translated into more than twenty different languages and is presented in the following volumes: Las estrellas vencidas (1964), Límite humano (1974), En busca de Cordelia and Poemas rumanos (1975), Antología personal (1979), Libro de alienaciones (1980), Eros (1981), Kampa (1986), Fósiles (1987), Rosas de fuego and Divan of the Opal of Fire (1996), La indetenible quietud (1998), El libro de los pájaros (1999) and Paralajes (2002).

=== Phases in her literature ===
The first stage of her literary career begins with the book Las estrellas vencidas. Followed by Límite humano (1974), En busca de Cordelia and poemas romanos (1975), Antología personal 1959–1979 (1979) and Libro de alienaciones (1980) In this period, Clara Janés represents herself as a traditional feminine figure in search for the origin of femininity. Moreover, she also incorporates existential elements such as anxiety, dissatisfaction, depression, loneliness, as well as relationships and their difficulties.

In search of answers to her questions about life, the poet defines a transition between the first and second stage of her career, with her collection of poems, Vivir (1983). The poems found in this collection address the serenity of spirit.

With the book Eros (1981) begins her second literature stage. This period is characterised by feminism, sensuality, eroticism and love. The entire theme of love achieves its peak in one of her following poetry books, Creciente fértil (1989).

== Acknowledgements ==
Relating to translation:

- (1992) Tutav Foundation Prize, Turkey, for her task in dissemination of Turkish poetry in Spain
- (1997) National Translation Prize for her entire work.
- (2000) Medal of Merit First category of the Czech Republic for her work as a translator and transmitter of the literature of the country
- (2007) X National Prize for Literature "Teresa de Ávila"

Her poetry has also won major awards:

- (1983) City of Barcelona Prize for Vivir
- (1998) City of Melilla Prize for Arcángel de sombra
- (2002) Poetry Prize Gil de Biedma for Los secretos del bosque

== Works ==
- Isla del suicidio. Poetry.
- Las estrellas vencidas, 1964. Poetry.
- La noche de Abel Micheli,1965. Novel.
- Desintegración, 1969. Novel.
- La vida callada de Federico Mompou, 1972. Biography.
- Tentativa de encuentro y tentativa de olvido, 1972.
- Límite humano, 1973. Poetry.
- Aprender a envejecer, 1973. Essay.
- Poemas Rumanos, 1973. Poetry.
- En busca de Cordelia y Poemas rumanos, 1975. Poetry.
- Cartas a Adriana, 1976. Novel.
- Antología personal (1959–1979), 1979. Poetry.
- Libro de alienaciones, 1980. Poetry.
- Sendas de Rumanía, 1981. Novel.
- Eros, 1981. Poetry.
- Pureza canelo, 1981. Biography.
- Tentativa de olvido, 1982. Tales.
- Roig, Montserrat. Before the civil war, 1982. Tales.
- Pessarrodona, Marta. La búsqueda de Elizabeth, 1982. Tales.
- Vivir, 1983. Poetry.
- Fósiles, 1985. Poetry.
- Kampa : poesía, música y voz, 1986. Poetry.
- Las primeras poetisas en lengua castellana, 1986. Poetry.
- Federico Mompou : vida, textos y documentos, 1987. Essay.
- Lapidario, 1988. Poetry.
- Creciente fértil, 1989. Poetry.
- Los caballos del sueño, 1989. Novel.
- Jardín y laberinto, 1990. Biography.
- Esbozos, 1990. Poetry.
- El hombre de Adén, 1991. Novel.
- Emblemas, 1991. Poetry.
- Espejismos, 1991. Novel.
- Las palabras de la tribu: escritura y habla, 1993. Essay.
- Rosas de fuego, 1996. Poetry.
- Cirlot, el no mundo y la poesía imaginal, 1996. Essay.
- Diván del ópalo de fuego, 1996. Poetry.
- Espejos de agua, 1997. Tales.
- El persa. Cuento. Tales.
- "El libro de los pájaros" 1999.Poetry
- Arcángel de sombra, 2000. Poetry
- Los secretos del bosque, Visor, Madrid, 2002 (Premio J. Gil de Biedma, 2002).
- "Paralajes", Barcelona, Tusquets, 2002. Poetry.
- "Vilanos", Madrid, AdamaRamada, 2004. Poetry.
- "Fractales", Valencia, Pre-Textos, 2005. Poetry.
- "Huellas sobre una corteza", Valladolid, Fundación Jorge Guillén, 2005. Poetry.
- "Los números oscuros" Siruela, 2006. Poetry.
- "La indetenible quietud", Siruela, 2008. Poetry.
- "Variables ocultas", 2010. Poetry.
- "De la realidad y la poesía: Tres conversaciones y un poema", 2010. Ensayo y poesía.
- "Orbes del sueño" Vaso Roto, 2013. Poetry.
- "Según la costumbre de las olas" 2013. Poetry.
- "Movimientos insomnes". 2014.
- "Poética y Poesía". 2014.

== Bibliography ==
- C. Wilcox, J. CLARA JANES: HACIA SU POEMARIO DE LOS AÑOS OCHENTA. [Pdf] Available at: https://cvc.cervantes.es/literatura/aih/pdf/10/aih_10_3_038.pdf [Accessed 27 Feb. 2016].
- Ugalde, Sharn Keefe (2012). "Review of Cultural Encounters in Contemporary Spain: The Poetry of Clara Janés". Hispanic Review. 80 (2): 337–340. doi:10.1353/hir.2012.0025. JSTOR 41472670. S2CID 144452192.
- Cervantesvirtual.com. (2016). Clara Janés [online] Available at: https://www.cervantesvirtual.com/portales/clara_janes/ [Accessed 26 Feb. 2016].
- Sabogal, W. (2015). Clara Janés: "Vivo con dolor toda esta crisis de España". [Online] EL PAÍS. Available in: https://cultura.elpais.com/cultura/2015/05/09/actualidad/1431188472_728812.html [Accessed 6 Feb. 2016].
- Amediavoz.com, (2016). Clara Janés. [Online] Available at: http://amediavoz.com/janes.htm [Accessed 6 Feb. 2016].
- YouTube, (2013). CONFERENCIA CLARA JANÉS. [Online] Available at: https://www.youtube.com/watch?v=qx46PalDHyg [Accessed 10 Feb. 2016].
- abc (2015). Los "Movimientos insomnes" de Clara Janés antes de su ingreso en la RAE. [Online] Available at: https://www.abc.es/cultura/libros/20150930/abci-clara-janes-movimientos-insomnes-201509292032.html [Accessed 6 Feb. 2016].
- escritoras.com (2015). Clara Janés en escritoras.com. [online] . Available in: https://web.archive.org/web/20160811071531/https://escritoras.com/escritoras/Clara-Janes [Accessed 26 Feb. 2016].
- Sites.google.com. (Nd) CLARA JANÉS POEMAS [online] Available at: https://sites.google.com/site/clarajanespoemas/ [Accessed 26 Feb. 2016].
- Sigüenza, C. (2016). Clara Janés: Me gusta cuando se une misticismo y erotismo. [Online] Diariodeibiza.es. Available in: https://www.diariodeibiza.es/pitiuses-balears/2015/10/01/clara-janes-gusta-une-misticismo/796711.html [Accessed 26 Feb. 2016].
- Real Academia Española. (2015). Elegida la poeta y traductora Clara Janés para ocupar la silla "U" [online] Available at: http://www.rae.es/noticias/elegida-la-poeta-y-traductora-clara-janes-para-ocupar -the-chair-u [Accessed 6 Feb. 2016].
- Sabogal, W. (2015). Clara Janés: "El viaje hacia el amor es conocimiento." [Online] EL PAÍS. Available in: https://cultura.elpais.com/cultura/2015/10/28/babelia/1446046103_712547.html [Accessed 26 Feb. 2016].
- Francis, Natalia Margaret (1998). Resurreccion y metamorfosis hacia un ser d/escrito en amor: La obra de Clara Janes [Resurrection and metamorphosis towards a being written in love: The work of Clara Janes] (Thesis) (in Spanish). OCLC 1194706422. ProQuest 41472670.
- Vela del Campo, J. Á. (1991). La vida de san Juan de la Cruz cantada en Ópera [Online] elpaís.com. Available in: http://elpais.com/diario/1991/04/05/cultura/670802408_850215.htm
- La Vanguardia (2011). Clara Janés gana el I Premio de Poesía Experimental Francisco Pino [online] Available ent: http://www.lavanguardia.com/local/barcelona/20111021/54234939818/clara-janes-gana-el-i-premio-de-poesia-experimental-francisco-pino.html [Accessed 26 Feb. 2016].
