= Elsa López =

Spanish writer (born 1943)

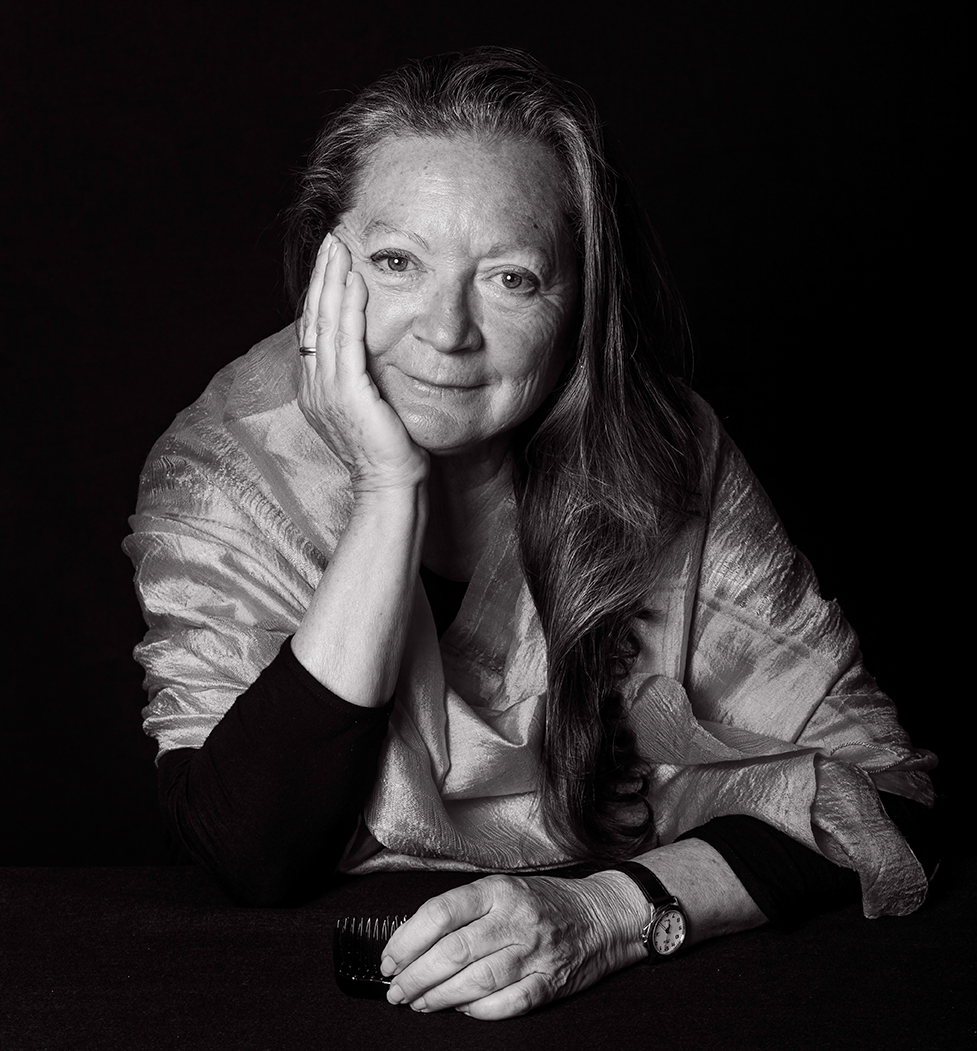
- López in 2017
- Born: Amada Elsa López Rodríguez; 17 January 1943 (age 83); Santa Isabel, Spanish Guinea (now Malabo, Equatorial Guinea)
- Education: Complutense University of Madrid
- Occupation: Writer
- Awards: City of Melilla International Poetry Award (1987); José Hierro National Poetry Award (2002); Gold Medal of the Canary Islands (2006)
- Website: elsalopez.wordpress.com

Amada Elsa López Rodríguez (born 17 January 1943) is a Spanish writer specializing in poetry.

== Biography ==
Amada Elsa López Rodríguez was born and lived in Fernando Poo (now Bioko), Equatorial Guinea until 1947, the year she moved to the island of La Palma, Canary Islands. In 1955 she moved to Madrid where she began Baccalaureate studies.

In 1965 she obtained a licentiate in Philosophy from the Complutense University of Madrid and, after a year as a professor of Spanish Literature in Lausanne, Switzerland, in 1966 she became a professor at the liberal Colegio Estudio in Madrid, successor to the Institución Libre de Enseñanza.

In 1972 she started teaching at different institutes of secondary education, obtaining a doctorate in Philosophy and Literature in 1980, and in 1982 the Chair of Philosophy at the Instituto Isabel la Católica in Madrid, where she taught until 1993. From 1987 to 1989 she chaired the Literature Section of the Ateneo de Madrid and directed the Siddharth Mehta publishing house, creating her own publishing house in 1989, Ediciones La Palma.

In 1993 López received the First José Pérez Vidal Research Prize and moved to the Canary Islands on a commission to direct and coordinate the government projects El Papel de Canarias (1993) and Memoria de las islas (1994–2000). That same year she founded the Casa de Jorós ethnographic museum and popular art center in Santa Cruz de La Palma.

From 2002 to 2006 she directed the Antonio Gala Foundation for Young Creators. She was dismissed because of disagreements with Antonio Gala, although the writer had previously announced that she wanted to leave the position.

She currently directs Ediciones La Palma and Promoción Cero. Her work has been recognized with numerous awards, such as the City of Melilla International Poetry Award in 1987 and the First José Pérez Vidal Research Prize in 1993, and has been included in several anthologies and translated into different languages.

== Awards ==
- City of Melilla International Poetry Award, 1987
- Rosa de Damasco International Poetry Award, 1989
- First José Pérez Vidal Research Prize, 1993
- 12th José Hierro National Poetry Award, 2002
- 13th Ricardo Molina City of Córdoba Poetry Award, 2005
- Gold Medal of the Canary Islands, 2016

== Works ==
=== Poetry ===
- El viento y las adelfas (1973)
- Inevitable océano (1982)
- Penumbra (1985)
- Del amor imperfecto, 1987 City of Melilla International Poetry Award (1987)
- La Casa Cabrera (1989)
- La fajana oscura, 1989 Rosa de Damasco International Poetry Award (1990)
- Cementerio de elefantes (1992)
- Al final del agua (1993)
- Tránsito (1995)
- Magarzas (1997)
- Mar de amores, 12th José Hierro National Poetry Award (2002)
- Ministerio del Aire, antología 1973-2003 (2003)
- Quince poemas (de amor adolescente) (2003)
- La pecera (2005)
- A mar abierto, poesía 1973–2003 (2006)
- Travesía, 13th Ricardo Molina City of Córdoba Poetry Award (2006)
- Viaje a la nada, Hiperión, Madrid, 2016, 65 pages

=== Narrative ===
- El corazón de los pájaros (2001)
- Las brujas de la isla del viento (2006)
- Una gasa delante de mis ojos (2011)

=== Anthropology ===
- Estudio antropológico-social de una comunidad campesina en la zona de Garafía, al norte de la Isla de La Palma (1976)
- El tablado de la Montañeta, estructura social y cultural de una comunidad campesina en la Isla de la Palma, doctoral thesis (1980)
- Identidad rural y etnicidad insular (1981)
- El serinoque, música y poesía en la Isla de La Palma (1982)
- Expresiones simbólicas a través de un ejemplo de arquitectura popular (1983)
- Símbolo y realidad en la canción de cuna (1984)
- El viento como metáfora de la locura en las Islas Canarias (1986)
- La simbología en la medicina popular canaria (1987)
- España canta (1990)
- Arquitectura y espacio canario, forma y color como signo en El Tablado (1990)
- La sabiduría popular en la arquitectura (1994)

=== Biography ===
- Diego Hidalgo, memoria de un tiempo difícil (1986)
- José Pérez Vidal, biografía de un etnógrafo canario (1987)

=== Theater ===
- Morir sin campanas (1973)
- De topo en topo (1974)
- Canarias mágica (1987)
- El recodo del sol (1988)
- La Isla de La Palma (1992)
