= Eduardo García de Enterría =

Spanish jurist

The Most Excellent Eduardo García de Enterría
- Born: Eduardo García de Enterría y Martínez-Carande; 27 April 1923; Ramales de la Victoria, Spain
- Died: 16 September 2013 (aged 90); Madrid, Spain

Seat U of the Real Academia Española
- In office 4 December 1949 – 16 September 2013
- Preceded by: Alfonso García Valdecasas
- Succeeded by: Clara Janés

Eduardo García de Enterría y Martínez-Carande (27 April 1923 – 16 September 2013) was a Spanish jurist and a major contributor to the research and teaching of Public Law in Spain. In 1984, he was awarded the Prince of Asturias Award for Social Sciences for his "important research and teaching work".

Born in Ramales de la Victoria, province of Santander (current Cantabria), he studied law at the Universities of Barcelona and Madrid, where he obtained his Doctoral Degree, cum laude. Later, he continued his studies at the Universities of London and Jena.

In 1947, he became a lawyer for the Spanish Council of State, later obtaining the chair of Administrative Law at the University of Valladolid (1957). He joined the law faculty at the Complutense University of Madrid in 1962 where, from 1970, he was the head of the department. From 1988 he was Professor Emeritus at the Free College of University Emeriti in Madrid.

He was the first Spanish judge on the European Court of Human Rights in Strassbourg, where he served from April, 1978 to February, 1986. He also presided over the Fédération International pour le Droit Européen (FIDE); founded and presided over the Spanish Association for the Study of European Law, and took part in the Academic Council of the European Law Research Center at Harvard Law School.

He co-founded and was the first Vice-President of the "World Society of Friends of Jorge Luis Borges" and the "International Can Mossenya Foundation - Friends of J. L. Borges" In 1974, he established the Revista Española de Derecho Administrativo and was its director until his death. He was also on the editorial staff of several other Spanish periodicals and journals, as well as the Yearbook of European Law and the European Review of Public Law.

His law office in Madrid has helped to develop the procedures for creating and registering NGOs. He also participated in several commissions formed to draft Spanish laws; including the Spanish Constitution of 1978.

== Honors ==
=== Academic positions ===
From 1970, he was an Academic Numerary at the Royal Academy of Jurisprudence and Legislation and, from 1984, at the Royal Spanish Academy. In 2004, he became a member of the Accademia Nazionale dei Lincei. He also held the position of Doctor Honoris Causa at over a dozen universities in Spain and Latin-America, as well as at the Sorbonne.

=== Awards ===
- Prince of Asturias Award for Social Sciences (1984)
- Alexis de Tocqueville Prize of the European Institute for Public Administration (1999)
- Cristóbal Gabarrón Foundation Award for Lifetime Achievement (2005)
- Menéndez Pelayo International Prize (2006)

== Selected works ==
- La Constitución como Norma y el Tribunal Constitucional, Civitas (1981) ISBN 84-7398-156-1
- Fervor de Borges, Trotta (1999) ISBN 84-8164-338-6
- De Montañas y Hombres, Austral (2001) ISBN 84-239-7441-3
- La Batalla por las Medidas Cautelares, Civitas (2004) ISBN 84-4702-516-0
- Revolución Francesa y Administración Contemporánea, Civitas (2005) ISBN 84-470-0440-6
- La Administración Española, Alianza (2005) ISBN 84-206-1389-4
- La Lengua de los Derechos, Alianza (2007) ISBN 84-206-7937-2
- Las Transformaciones de la Justicia Administrativa, Civitas (2007) ISBN 84-470-2705-8
- Hamlet en Nueva York: Autores, Obras, Paisajes, La Esfera de los Libros (2008) ISBN 84-973473-0-7
- Democracia, Jueces y Control de la Administración, Civitas (2009) ISBN 84-470-1430-4
