= Pedro Cerezo Galán =

Spanish philosopher and university professor

Pedro Cerezo Galán (born 14 February 1935, Hinojosa del Duque) is a Spanish philosopher and university professor. His specialty is contemporary Western philosophy, including modern Spanish thinkers such as José Ortega y Gasset, Xavier Zubiri and Antonio Machado.

== Biography ==
He graduated from the Universidad Complutense de Madrid in 1958, with a degree in philosophy and literature, and obtained his doctorate there three years later. His thesis on the concept of ousia in Aristotle was published as a book in 1962. This was followed by studies at the University of Freiburg and the University of Heidelberg. He was also a Fellow at the Spanish National Research Council, the Goethe-Institut and the Alexander von Humboldt Foundation.

In 1968, he became an associate professor of philosophy at the University of Barcelona then, two years later, obtained the chair of history and philosophy at the University of Granada, where he remained until his retirement, serving as dean of the Faculty of Philosophy and letters. He is currently a Professor Emeritus.

In the general elections of 1982, he was chosen as a deputy, representing the District of Granada for the Spanish Socialist Workers' Party. From 1989 to 1991, he was a member of the advisory committee at the Juan March Foundation. In 2014, he was awarded the Menéndez Pelayo International Prize.

== Selected writings ==
- Palabra en el tiempo: Poesía y filosofía en Antonio Machado, Gredos, 1975 ISBN 84-249-0661-6
- La voluntad de aventura: Aproximaciones críticas al pensamiento de Ortega y Gasset, Ariel, 1984 ISBN 978-84-344-8709-3
- Las máscaras de lo trágico: Filosofía y tragedia en Miguel de Unamuno, Trotta, 1996 ISBN 978-84-8164-067-0
- El mal del siglo. El conflicto entre Ilustración y Romanticismo en la crisis finisecular del siglo XIX, Biblioteca Nueva, 2004 ISBN 978-84-974276-7-8
- Ética pública. Ethos civil, Biblioteca Nueva, 2010 ISBN 978-84-994016-4-5
- José Ortega y Gasset y la razón práctica, Biblioteca Nueva, 2011 ISBN 978-84-994019-0-4
