= Víctor García de la Concha =

Spanish philologist

The Most Excellent Víctor García de la Concha
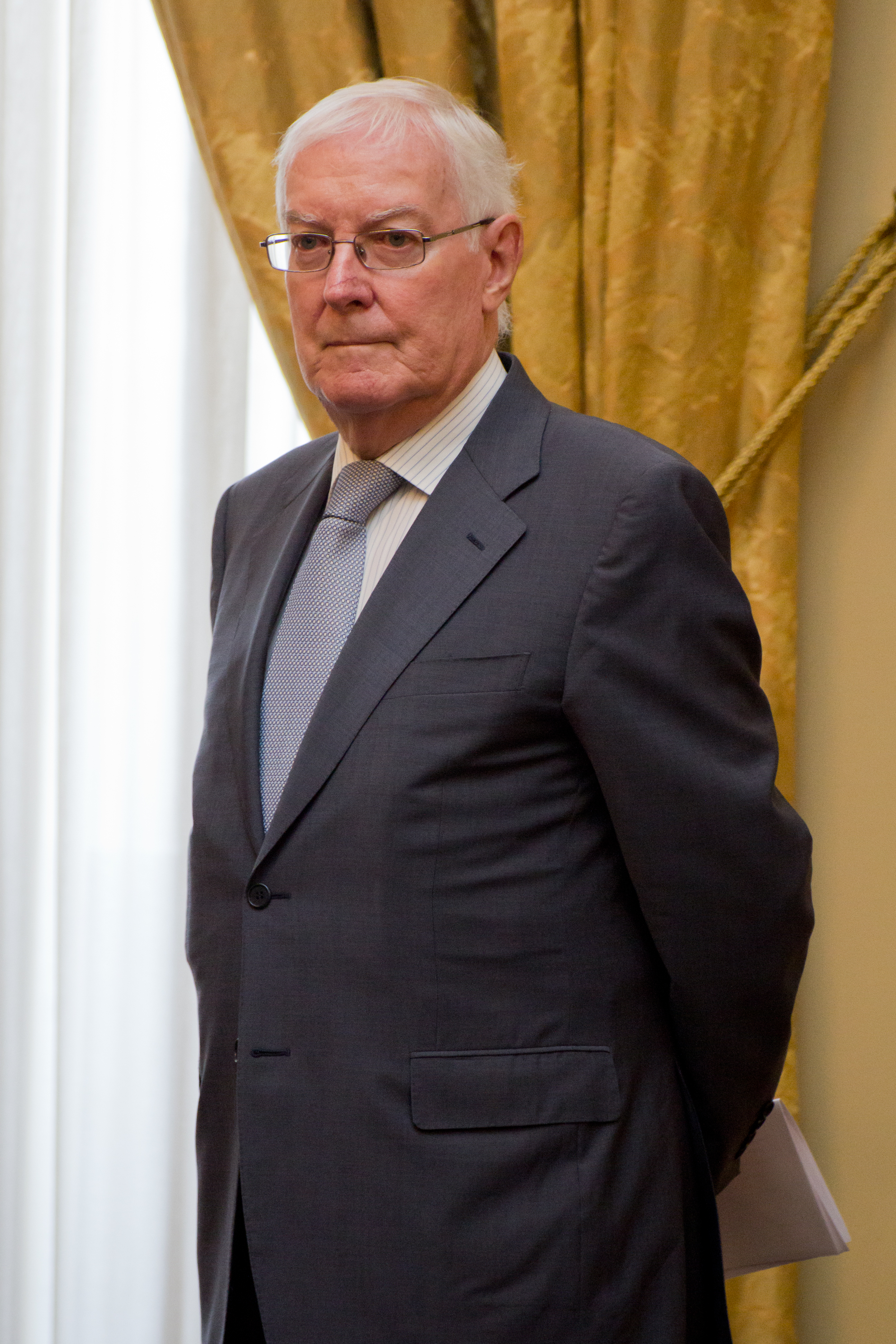
- García de la Concha in 2014
- Born: Víctor García de la Concha; 2 January 1934 (age 92); Villaviciosa (Asturias), Spain

Seat c of the Real Academia Española
- Incumbent
- Assumed office 10 May 1992 (Note: Elected on 7 November 1991)
- Preceded by: Ricardo Gullón

Director of the Real Academia Española
- In office 3 December 1998 – 15 December 2010
- Preceded by: Fernando Lázaro Carreter
- Succeeded by: José Manuel Blecua Perdices

Víctor García de la Concha (born 2 January 1934, Villaviciosa, Asturias) is a Spanish philologist. He is a past director of the Cervantes Institute and a past director of the Royal Spanish Academy. He served three four-year terms in that position, from 1998 to 2010. Directors usually serve no more than two terms.

== Life and career ==
De la Concha took his bachelor's degree in philosophy from the University of Oviedo and in Theology from the Pontifical Gregorian University in Rome. He taught at several institutions and universities, including the University of Valladolid, University of Murcia and University of Zaragoza, until he obtained the Chair of Spanish Literature at the University of Salamanca.

He was one of the scriptwriters for the 1984 TV mini-series Teresa de Jesús, and had a cameo role in one episode, playing the Archbishop of Seville, who blesses Teresa (while some of his University colleagues hold a canopy over them). In 1987, he became manager of the literary magazine Ínsula.

In 1992, he entered the Royal Spanish Academy as an Academic Numerary, occupying seat c. The next year, he became Secretary and, in 1998, Director. In 2000, he was named a Doctor Honoris Causa in Letters at Francisco Morazán National Pedagogic University in Tegucigalpa, on the occasion of his visit to the Academia Hondureña de la Lengua. In 2009, he received the Lázaro Carreter Prize, and in 2010, King Juan Carlos I named him a Knight of the Order of the Golden Fleece.

In 2011, he received the Menéndez Pelayo International Prize, and in January 2012, was named director of the Cervantes Institute.

== Selected works ==
- La Poesía Española de Posguerra, Prensa Española (1973)
- El Arte Literario de Santa Teresa, Ariel (1978) ISBN 84-344-8335-1
- León Felipe: Itinerario Poético, Consejeria de Educacion y Cultura (1986) ISBN 84-505-3234-5
- La Poesía Española de 1935 a 1975, Catedra (1987) ISBN 84-376-0697-7
- Nueva Lectura del Lazarillo, Castalia (1993) ISBN 84-7039-375-8
- Al Aire de su Vuelo: Estudios Sobre Santa Teresa, Fray Luis de León, San Juan de la Cruz y Calderón de la Barca, Galaxia Gutenberg (2004) ISBN 84-8109-497-8
- Cinco Novelas en Clave Simbólica, Alfaguara (2010) ISBN 978-84-204-0497-4
