= Francisco Rico Manrique =

Spanish philologist (1942–2024)

The Most Excellent Francisco Rico Manrique
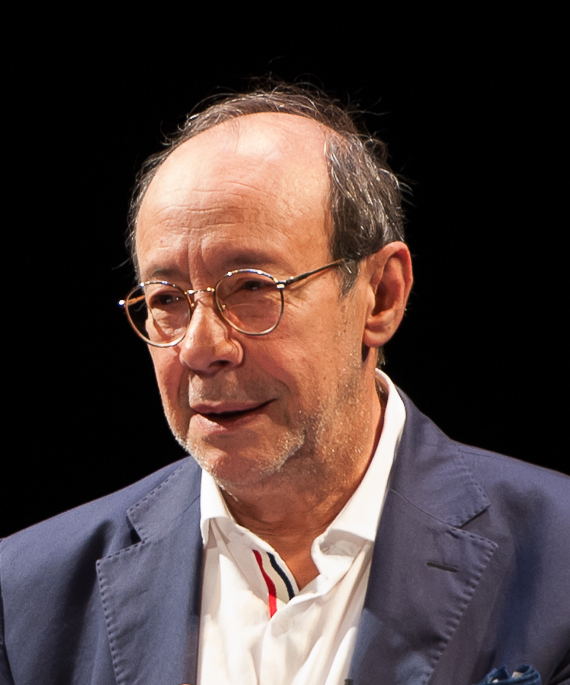
- Rico Manrique in 2014
- Born: Francisco Rico Manrique; 28 April 1942; Barcelona, Spain
- Died: 27 April 2024 (aged 81); Barcelona, Spain

Seat p of the Real Academia Española
- In office 4 June 1987 (Note: Elected on 13 March 1986) – 26 April 2024
- Preceded by: Seat established

Francisco Rico Manrique (28 April 1942 – 27 April 2024) was a Spanish philologist.

== Biography ==
Rico Manrique was a student of José Manuel Blecua and Martín de Riquer. He was a professor of Medieval Spanish Literature at the Autonomous University of Barcelona and, since 1987, a member of the Royal Spanish Academy as well as the Académia das Ciéncias de Lisboa, the Accademia Nazionale dei Lincei and the British Academy.

On 13 March 1986, he was elected to Seat p of the Real Academia Española. He took up his seat on 4 June 1987.

Rico Manrique had edited many classics from the medieval period and the "Siglo de Oro", and had written numerous studies on medieval and renaissance literature. He had also edited the Historia y Crítica de la Literatura Española (Nine volumes, with supplements).

Rico Manrique later oversaw the Classical Library series (started by Editorial Crítica and now a part of "Reader's Circle", a division of Bertelsmann) following guidelines from the Centro para la Edición de los Clásicos Españoles, which Rico began and helped to develop.

In 1998, he was awarded the twelfth Menéndez Pelayo International Prize and, in 2004, the Ramón Menéndez Pidal National Research Prize.

Rico Manrique died in Barcelona on 27 April 2024, at the age of 81.

== Selected works ==
- La novela picaresca y el punto de vista, Seix Barral (1970). English translation, The Picaresque Novel and the Point of View, Cambridge Univ. press, 1984.
- Alfonso el Sabio y la "General Estoria", Ariel (1972)
- Primera cuarentena y Tratado general de literatura, El Festín de Esopo (1982) ISBN 84-8570-427-4
- Texto y contextos: Estudios sobre la poesía española del siglo XV, Grijalba Mondadori (1991) ISBN 84-7423-501-4
- El sueño del humanismo Alianza (1993) ISBN 84-206-2754-2
- Figuras con paisaje, Destino (1994) ISBN 84-233-4200-X
- Los discursos del gusto, Destino (2003) ISBN 84-233-3573-9
- Tiempos del "Quijote", Acantilado (2012) ISBN 84-15-68908-X

== About Rico ==
- Brancaforte, Benito (1984). Sobre críticos y hombres : réplica a Francisco Rico. [Reply to Primera cuarentena y Tratado general de literatura]. Madison, Wisconsin: Hispanic Seminary of Medieval Studies. OCLC 49707306.
