= Premio Internacional de Poesía Ciudad de Melilla =

Spanish poetry award

The Premio Internacional de Poesía Ciudad de Melilla is one of Spain's top literary awards, given every year to an unpublished poetry collection by a Spanish-speaking author. The Prize was created in 1979 in honor of Miguel Fernández, Melilla's most distinguished poet, and is organized by the city's Consejería de la Cultura (Cultural Council). The Prize is awarded in October by a panel of renowned poets and critics, amid cultural festivities organized by Spain's UNED-Universidad Libre a Distancia and the City Hall.

In 2003, The Prize established a finalist or runner-up. The winner gets €18,000, while the finalist takes €9,000, and both books are published under the Prize's own collection by Visor, a poetry publisher.

In the beginning, The Prize received more than 600 manuscripts every year, but it has been decreasing during the last 5 years. In the last edition, only 43 candidates took part. Candidates are mostly from Spain, Argentina, Colombia, and Uruguay, but also from the United States and other parts of the world. Despite this, only three poets from outside Spain have ever won the award: Nicaraguan Gioconda Belli in 2006, Mexican Marco Antonio Campos in 2009, and Argentine Diana Bellessi in 2010.

== Winners ==
- 1979 Alfonso Canales,(Spain)
- 1980 Mariano Roldán, (Spain)
- 1981 Luis Rosales, (Spain)
- 1982 Miguel Fernández, (Spain)
- 1983 Pedro Molina Temboury, (Spain)
- 1984 Fernando Quiñones, (Spain)
- 1985 Miguel Ángel Velasco, (Spain)
- 1986 Antonio Abad, (Spain)
- 1987 Elsa López, (Spain, born in Equatorial Guinea)
- 1988 Almudena Guzmán, (Spain)
- 1989 Pablo García Baena, (Spain)
- 1990 Arcadio López-Casanova, (Spain)
- 1991 Ángel García López, (Spain)
- 1992 Rafael Morales, (Spain)
- 1993 Javier Yagüe Bosch, (Spain)
- 1994 Felipe Benítez Reyes, (Spain)
- 1995 Vicente Gallego, (Spain)
- 1996 Juan Carlos Suñén, (Spain)
- 1997 Luis Antonio de Villena, (Spain)
- 1998 Clara Janés, (Spain)
- 1999 Itzíar López Guil, (Spain)
- 2000 Ángeles Mora, (Spain)
- 2001 Benjamín Prado,(Spain)
- 2002 Antonio Jiménez Millán, (Spain)
- 2003 Antonio Cabrera, (Spain)
- 2004 Francisco Díaz de Castro, (Spain)
- 2005 Luis Alberto de Cuenca, (Spain)
- 2006 Gioconda Belli, (Nicaragua)
- 2007 Miguel García Posada, (Spain)
- 2008 Antonio Lucas, (Spain)
- 2009 Marco Antonio Campos,(Mexico)
- 2010 Diana Bellessi,(Argentina)
- 2011 Manuel Vilas Vidal,(Spain)
- 2012 Juan Van Halen,(Spain)
- 2013 Eduardo García, (Spain, born in Brasil)
