= Ciriaco Morón Arroyo =

Spanish philologist and professor

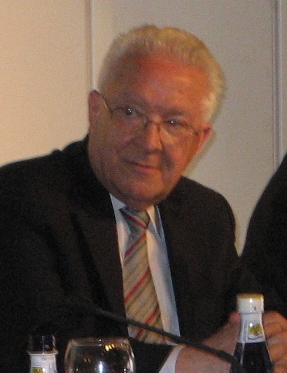
Ciriaco Morón Arroyo

Ciriaco Morón Arroyo (b. Pastrana, 8 August 1935) is a Spanish philologist and professor.

== Life and career ==
He took his bachelor's degree in Philosophy from the Pontifical University of Salamanca in 1957 and, in 1962, his doctorate from LMU Munich, where Heidegger was one of his early influences.

From 1971 until his retirement, he was the Emerson Hinchliff Professor of Spanish Studies at Cornell University in Ithaca, New York. He is currently an honorary researcher with the Discourse Analysis Group of the Human and Social Sciences Center at the Spanish National Research Council. He is a Doctor Honoris Causa in Humanities at Saint Joseph's University in Philadelphia.

He specializes in Spanish Literature and is an expert on the methodology of the History of Ideas. He has written about authors and books from every period, but certain themes recur throughout his work: The epistemology of the Humanities, Miguel de Cervantes, the Generation of '98, José Ortega y Gasset and the "Siglo de Oro". (His edition of Life is a Dream by Pedro Calderón de la Barca, from Editorial Cátedra, has gone through sixteen printings.)

In 2013, he received the Menéndez Pelayo International Prize.

== Selected works ==
=== English ===
- The Humanities in the Age of Technology, Catholic Universities of America Press (2002) ISBN 0-8132-1074-7
- Hamlet: A New Source, A New Reading, Editorial Mendaur S. L., (2016) ISBN 8494436171, 9788494436178

=== Spanish ===
- El Sistema de Ortega y Gasset, Alcalá (1968)
- Sentido y Forma de La Celestina , Cátedra (1974)
- Nuevas Meditaciones del Quijote , Gredos (1976)
- Calderón: Pensamiento y Teatro, Sociedad Menéndez Pelayo (1982) ISBN 84-600-2758-9
- El "Alma de España". Cien Años de Inseguridad, Nobel (1996) ISBN 84-8753-186-5
- Para Entender el Quijote, Rialp (2005) ISBN 84-321-3540-2
- Existencialismo, Diccionario Español de Términos Literarios Internacionales (DETLI), (2020) (PDF)
