= Luis Díez del Corral =

Spanish jurist, writer and political scientist (1911–1998)

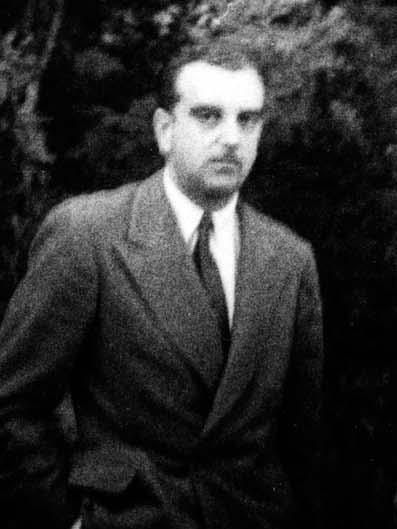
Luis Díez del Corral

Luis Díez del Corral y Pedruzo (5 July 1911, in Logroño – 7 April 1998, in Madrid) was a Spanish jurist, writer and political scientist. He was legal counsel and a deputy in the Spanish Cortes from 1943–49, during the first legislative sessions of the Franco Period and was the chief of the "Section for Corporate and Social Management" of the Institute for Political Studies (now the Center for Political and Constitutional Studies).

== Biography ==
He began preparing for his legal career at the Central University of Madrid. Thanks to a scholarship, he was able to continue his studies at the University of Berlin and the University of Freiburg.

In 1936, he became a lawyer with the Spanish Council of State. As the author of many books on the relationship between history and politics, in 1947 he obtained the Chair for "History of Political Ideas and Methods" on the Faculty of Political Science and Economics at the Complutense University of Madrid.

In 1942, he received the Premio Nacional de Literatura for his travel book, Mallorca. In 1988, he was awarded the Prince of Asturias Prize in the Social Sciences, "for his exceptional contribution to the history of political ideas and institutions, and for his exemplary work teaching in the humanistic, conservative tradition". In 1996, he won the Menéndez Pelayo International Prize, for his lifetime achievements.

He was a member of the Royal Academy of Fine Arts of San Fernando, the Royal Academy of History and President of the Royal Academy of Moral and Political Sciences, as well as being a Doctor Honoris Causa at the Sorbonne. In 1953, he became a member of the Legion of Honor.

== Selected works ==
=== English ===
- The Rape of Europe. Translated by by Harold V. Livermore. London: George Allen & Unwin. 1959 – via Internet Archive.
- Majorca, translated by Michael Byrne, drawings by E. C. Ricart, Allen-Unwin (1963) ISBN 0-04-914024-8

=== Spanish ===
- Ensayos Sobre Arte y Sociedad, Revista de Occidente (1955)
- Del Viejo al Nuevo Mundo, Revista de Occidente (1963)
- La Monarquía de España en el Pensamiento Político Europeo. De Maquiavelo a Humboldt, Revista de Occidente (1976) ISBN 84-292-8730-2
- Velázquez, la Monarquía e Italia, Lectorum (1979) ISBN 84-239-2516-1
- El Liberalismo Doctrinario, Centro de Estudios Constitucionales, 4th ed. (1984) ISBN 84-259-0394-7
- El Pensamiento Político de Tocqueville, Alianza (1989) ISBN 84-206-2584-1
