= Eulalio Ferrer =

Eulalio Ferrer Rodríguez (26 February 1921, Santander – 25 March 2009, Mexico City) was a Spanish-Mexican entrepreneur, involved in communications and advertising. In 1960, he and some associates created a company called "Anuncios Modernos" (Modern Advertising). Later, he created his own company, now known as "Ferrer Comunicación", or "Grupo Ferrer". He was a member of the Academia Mexicana de la Lengua.

== Biography ==
At the age of 16, he became the local secretary of the Socialist Youth of Spain in Santander. Three years later, he was the youngest Captain in the Spanish Civil War. When the war turned in favor of the Nationalists, he fled to France and, after spending some time at the refugee camp in Argelès-sur-Mer, he emigrated to Mexico.

In 1987, the Menéndez Pelayo International Prize was established with the help of a generous grant from Ferrer. Four years later, he was elected to fill Seat XXII at the Mexican Academy of Language. His first speech was on the subject of the use of language in advertising. In 2000, he became the group's Treasurer. Among his notable lectures were "The Grammar of Color" and "Remembering Jules Verne". He was also a regular contributor to the "Lengua Viva" section in the newspaper, Reforma

Following his initiative, in 1992 the Real Academia Española recognized the verb "cantinflear", meaning "to speak in an absurd and incongruous way, while saying nothing" or "to act in the same manner".

In addition to his membership at Mexican Academy of Language, he was a corresponding member of the Real Academia Española and the North American Academy of the Spanish Language as well as a full member of the Sociedad Mexicana de Geografía y Estadística.

In 2012, the Fundación Cervantina de México established the "Premio Internacional Eulalio Ferrer" to "distinguish outstanding personalities who have excelled by their contributions to know, understand and enhance those aspects that define what it means to be human".

== Writings ==
- Publicidad y Comunicación, Editorial Oceano, 2002 ISBN 978-968-16-6689-7
