= Fernando Lázaro Carreter =

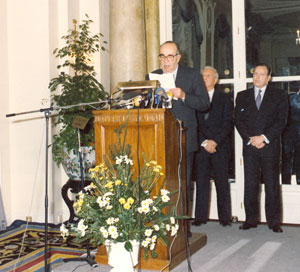
- Lázaro Carreter in 1994
- Born: 13 April 1923; Zaragoza, Spain
- Died: 13 March 2004 (aged 80); Madrid, Spain
- Education: Complutense University of Madrid; University of Zaragoza
- Occupations: Linguist, journalist and literary critic
- Employers: Complutense University of Madrid; University of Salamanca; Autonomous University of Madrid; Ruprecht Karl University of Heidelberg; University of Texas at Austin; University of Toulouse
- Organization: Colegio Libre de Eméritos

Seat R of the Real Academia Española
- In office 11 June 1972 (Note: Elected on 13 January 1972) – 13 March 2004
- Preceded by: Luis Martínez Kléiser
- Succeeded by: Javier Marías

Director of the Real Academia Española
- In office 5 December 1991 – 2 December 1998
- Preceded by: Manuel Alvar
- Succeeded by: Víctor García de la Concha

Fernando Lázaro Carreter (Note: In this Spanish name, the first or paternal surname is Lázaro and the second or maternal family name is Carreter.) (13 April 1923 – 4 March 2004) was a Spanish linguist, journalist and literary critic.

Lázaro Carreter worked to improve the way the Spanish language is spoken and written, and penned the hugely popular 1997 book El dardo en la palabra ("The Dart in the Word"), a collection of articles he wrote on linguistic gaffes in the media. He was a member, occupying Seat R, of the Royal Spanish Academy (Real Academia Española), the language's official arbiter, from 1972 until his death, and was its president for seven years, 1991–1998. He taught at the Autonomous University of Madrid.

He died on 4 March 2004 in Madrid at aged 80 from a multiple organ failure.

== Works ==
His works fall into five categories: linguistic studies, literary studies, secondary‑school textbooks, journalistic articles, and dramatic works.

=== Linguistic studies ===
- El habla de Magallón. Notas para el estudio del aragonés vulgar (1945), a dialect study on the vernacular speech of Magallón.
- His doctoral thesis, Las ideas lingüísticas en España durante el siglo XVIII (1949), was one of the first investigations into the history of linguistic ideas in Spain.
- His 1972 Academy inauguration lecture Crónica del Diccionario de Autoridades (1713–1740) is also notable.
- The Diccionario de términos filológicos was first published in 1953, with expanded editions in 1963 and 1968—notwithstanding its age, it remains a key reference.
- In the 1970s he applied generative grammar perspectives to Spanish linguistics, notably debating Emilio Alarcos Llorach on the definite article and passive constructions (1975).
- Many of his linguistic essays are collected in Estudios de lingüística (1980).

=== Literary studies ===
He produced both author‑ and genre‑specific studies and works in literary theory.

- Among his literary studies on the Golden Age are Estilo barroco y personalidad creadora (1966, expanded ed. 1974), Clásicos españoles. De Garcilaso a los niños pícaros (2003), and the picaresque-focused «Lazarillo de Tormes» en la picaresca (1972), as well as his philological edition of Quevedo’s La vida del Buscón llamado Don Pablos (1965).
- In literary theory he introduced structuralist and Russian Formalist ideas, particularly Roman Jakobson’s Poetics. His main contributions include Estudios de Poética (la obra en sí) (1976) and De poética y poéticas (1990).

=== Secondary‑school textbooks ===
After exposure to French text‑commentary methods in the 1950s, he co‑authored Cómo se comenta un texto en el bachillerato (1957) with Evaristo Correa Calderón, later revised as Cómo se comenta un texto literario (1974). He went on to write widely‑used Spanish language and literature textbooks (alone or with Correa Calderón and Vicente Tusón Valls) extensively used in Spain from the 1960s through the 1990s.

=== Journalistic articles ===
His theatre reviews appeared weekly in Gaceta Ilustrada and later in Blanco y Negro. Only a few were compiled posthumously in Azaña, Lorca, Valle y otras sombras His language‑correction articles under the heading El dardo en la palabra began in *Informaciones* (1975), were syndicated by Agencia EFE, ran in *El País* (1999–2003), and were collected in the books El dardo en la palabra (1997) and El nuevo dardo en la palabra (2003). These writings popularized language usage debates with a humorous tone but without normative authority.

=== Dramatic works ===
In the 1950s he wrote two plays, La señal (1952) and Un hombre ejemplar (1956), the former staged at Madrid's Teatro María Guerrero in 1956. He achieved greater success with the comedy La ciudad no es para mí, under the pseudonym Fernando Ángel Lozano. It premiered in theatre from 1962 (with Paco Martínez Soria) and was adapted into a film in 1965. He once described the play as “a venial sin.”

== Honours and distinctions ==
He received honorary doctorates from the universities of Zaragoza (1985), Salamanca (1986), the Autonomous University of Madrid (1988), Valladolid (1993), La Laguna (1994), and La Coruña (1997). He was awarded the French «Commandeur dans l’Ordre des Arts et des Lettres» (1979), Spain’s Cruz de San Jorge (1983), the Gold Medal of Zaragoza (1997), Argentina’s Order of Merit (1998), and the Grand Cross of Alfonso X the Wise (2000). He also received numerous prizes including the Manuel Aznar Journalism Prize (1982), the Mariano de Cavia Prize (1984), the Aragón de las Letras (1990), the Blanquerna Prize (1993), the International Menéndez Pelayo Prize (1994), the National Journalism Prize Miguel Delibes (1996), the Don Juan de Borbón Prize (1997), and the City of Alcalá Arts and Letters Prize (2003).

In his memory, the Fundación Germán Sánchez Ruipérez established the Lázaro Carreter Prize, and the city council of Zaragoza created the Lázaro Carreter Dramatic Literature Prize. Several Spanish secondary schools and libraries bear his name.
