= José Manuel Blecua Teijeiro =

Spanish philologist

José Manuel Blecua Teijeiro (Alcolea de Cinca, Huesca, 10 November 1913 – Barcelona, 8 March 2003) was a Spanish philologist, professor of Spanish Literature at the University of Barcelona and a member of the Royal Spanish Academy.

He took his bachelor's degree at the College of Saint Thomas Aquinas in Zaragoza, under the tutelage of Miguel Labordeta. At the University of Zaragoza he studied Law and Philosophy. He was a teacher for twenty years at the Cuevas Institute in Almanzora and, later, at the Goya Institute in Zaragoza. In 1959, he moved to the Universidad de Barcelona, where he was one of the founders of the Spanish Philological Institute. He wrote his doctoral thesis on El Cancionero de 1628, a long poem by Adrián de Prado.

Blecua specialized in poetry and literature from the "Siglo de Oro". He published many works on that period and produced a monumental critical edition of the poetry of Francisco de Quevedo. He also edited a major anthology of Spanish Renaissance poetry.

In 1993, he was awarded the seventh Menéndez Pelayo International Prize. An institute in Zaragoza has been named after him.

== Selected works ==
- Los Pájaros en la Poesía Española Hispanica (1943)
- Las Flores en la Poesía Española Hispanica (1944)
- Preceptiva Literaria y Nociones de Gramática Histórica, Aula (1944)
- Historia General de la Literatura, Librería General (1944)
- El Mar en la Poesía Española Hispanica (1945)
- Lengua Española, Librería General (1959)
- Los Géneros Literarios y su Historia, Librería General (1961)
- Historia y Textos de la Literatura Española, Librería General (1963)
- Sobre Poesía de la Edad de Oro: Ensayos y Notas Eruditas, Gredos (1970)
- Lingüística y Significacíon, Salvat (1973) ISBN 84-345-7371-7
- Sobre el Rigor Poético en España y Otros Ensayos, Ariel (1977) ISBN 84-344-8330-0
- Homenajes y Otras Labores, Institución Fernando el Católico (1990) ISBN 978-84-7820-050-4
