= List of compositions by George Antheil =

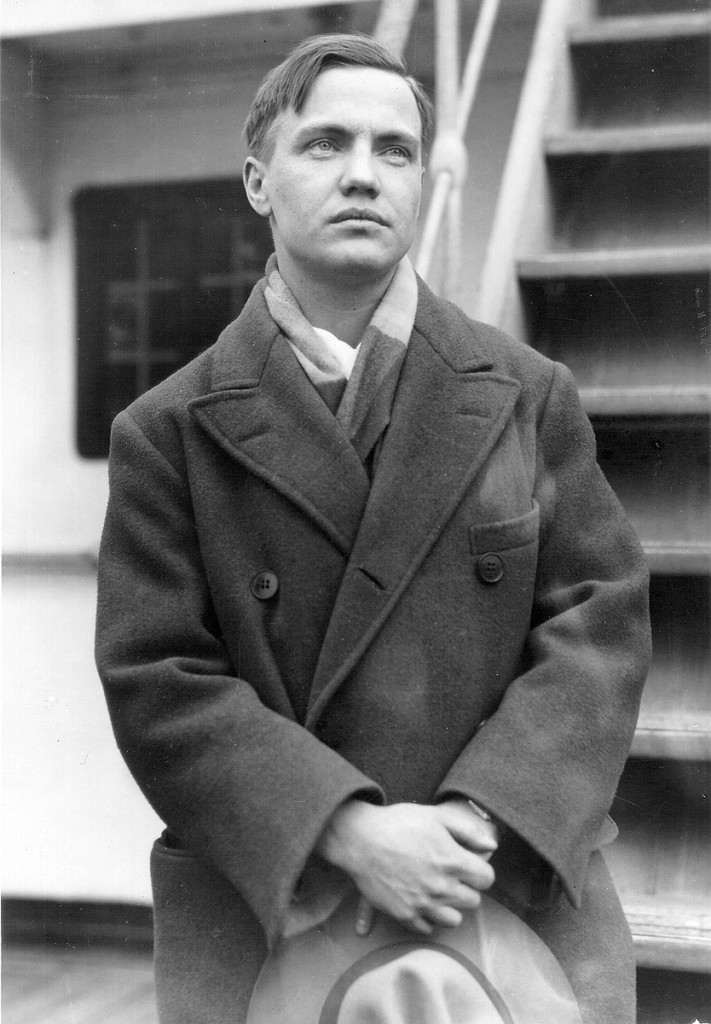
George Antheil in 1927

George Antheil composed in a wide array of musical styles and for various ensembles. The following list is all of his compositions sorted both by genre and chronologically.

== Works ==
=== Opera ===
- Transatlantic (1928-30)
- Helen Retires (1931-34)
- Volpone (1949–1952)
- The Brothers (1954)
- Venus in Africa (1954)
- The Wish (1955)

=== Ballet ===
- Ballet Mécanique (1923–25, revised 1952–53)
- Les Saisons (1934)
- Les Yeux de Gutne (1934)
- Reves (1935)
- Dans la Caverne (1948)
- Capitale du Monde (1953)

=== Orchestral ===
- Capital of the World, suite (ca. 1955)
- Decatur at Algiers (1943)
- Dreams, ballet score for George Balanchine (1935)
- Hot-time Dance (1948)
- A Jazz Symphony (1925, revised 1955)
- McKonkey's Ferry, A Concert Overture (1948)
- Piano Concerto No. 1 (1922; had its world premiere as late as 2001, with the pianist Michael Rische)
- Piano Concerto No. 2 (1926)
- Serenade for Strings No. 1 (1948)
- Serenade No. 2 (1949)
- Symphony No. 1 "Zingareska" (1920–22, rev. 1923)
- Symphony in F (1925–26)
- Symphony No. 2 (1931–38, rev. 1943)
- Symphony No. 3 "American" (1936–39, rev. 1946)
- Symphony No. 4 "1942" (1942)
- Tragic Symphony (1945–46)
- Symphony No. 5 "Joyous" (1947–48)
- Symphony No. 6 "After Delacroix" (1947–48)
- Tom Sawyer – California Overture (1949)
- Violin Concerto (1946)

=== Chamber and instrumental ===
- Concert for Chamber Orchestra (Wind Octet) (1932)
- Concertino for flute, bassoon, and piano (1930)
- Lithuanian Night for String Quartet (1922)
- Six Little Pieces for String Quartet (1931)
- Sonata for Flute and Piano (1951)
- Sonata for Trumpet and Piano (1951)
- Sonata for Violin Solo (for Olga Rudge) [unfinished] (1927)
- Sonata No. 1 for Violin and Piano (for Olga Rudge) (1923)
- Sonata No. 2 for Violin and Piano (for Ezra Pound) (1923)
- Sonata No. 3 for Violin and Piano (1924)
- Sonata No. 4 for Violin and Piano, a.k.a. "New Second Violin Sonata" (1947–48)
- Sonatina for Violin and Piano (1945)
- String Quartet No. 1 (1924)
- String Quartet No. 2 (1927)
- String Quartet No. 3 (1948)
- Suite for Piano four-hands (1922 rev. 1939)
- Symphony for 5 Instruments (1922–23, second version 1923)

=== Solo piano ===
- Sonate Sauvage (First Piano Sonata) (1923)
- Airplane Sonata (Second Piano Sonata) (1922)
- Third Piano Sonata "Death of Machines" (1923)
- Jazz Sonata (Fourth Piano Sonata) (1923)
- Fifth Piano Sonata für lieber Juri (1923)
- Woman Sonata (1923)
- Piano Sonatina for Radio (1929)
- (New) Piano Sonata No. 3 (1947)
- (New) Piano Sonata No. 4 (1948)
- (New) Piano Sonata No. 5 (1950)
- La Femme 100 Têtes (after Max Ernst) for solo piano (1933)
- Valentine Waltzes for solo piano (1949)

=== Film ===
Of his many film scores, Dementia (1955), contains no dialogue, only music.

- The Young Don't Cry (1957)
- The Pride and the Passion (1957)
- Air Power (1956) TV series (unknown episodes)
- Dementia (1955)
- Not as a Stranger (1955)
- Hunters of the Deep (1954)
- The Juggler (1953)
- Target Hong Kong (1953)
- Actor's and Sin (1952) (uncredited)
- The Sniper (1952)
- Sirocco (1951)
- In a Lonely Place (1950)
- House by the River (1950)
- Tokyo Joe (1949)
- The Fighting Kentuckian (1949)
- We Were Strangers (1949)
- Knock on Any Door (1949)
- Along the Oregon Trail (1947)
- Repeat Performance (1947)
- That Brennan Girl (1946) (score music)
- Plainsman and the Lady (1946)
- Specter of the Rose (1946)
- Angels Over Broadway (1940)
- Adventure in Diamonds (1940)
- The Buccaneer (1938)
- Make Way for Tomorrow (1937)
- The Plainsman (1936)
- Once in a Blue Moon (1935)
- The Scoundrel (1935)
