= Carl Edouarde =

American composer (1875–1932)

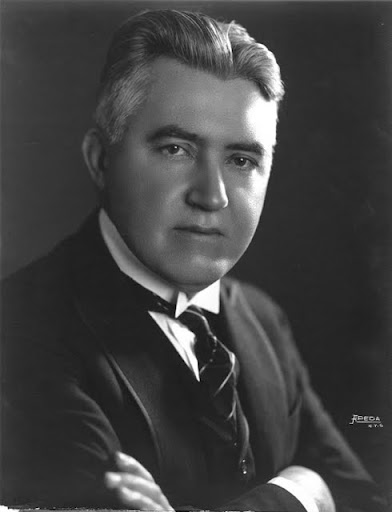
- Portrait of Edouarde
- Born: October 31, 1875; Cleveland, Ohio, U.S.
- Died: December 8, 1932 (aged 57); Locust, New Jersey, U.S.
- Resting place: Mount Hope Cemetery; Rochester, New York, U.S.
- Education: Royal Conservatory of Music
- Occupation: Composer
- Years active: 1918–1931
- Employer: Walt Disney Animation Studios (1928)
- Spouse: Marian Doty (m. 1904)
- Children: 1

Carl Edouarde (October 31, 1875 – December 8, 1932) was an American composer of film music, known particularly for his association with Samuel Roxy Rothafel.

== Early life ==
Carl Edouarde was born in Cleveland, Ohio, on October 31, 1875. He was born to an Irish–American family and began playing violin at a young age. He attended the Royal Conservatory of Music in Leipzig. He played the violin and at his graduation in 1889, he was gifted a violin by Kaiser Wilhelm II.

== Career ==
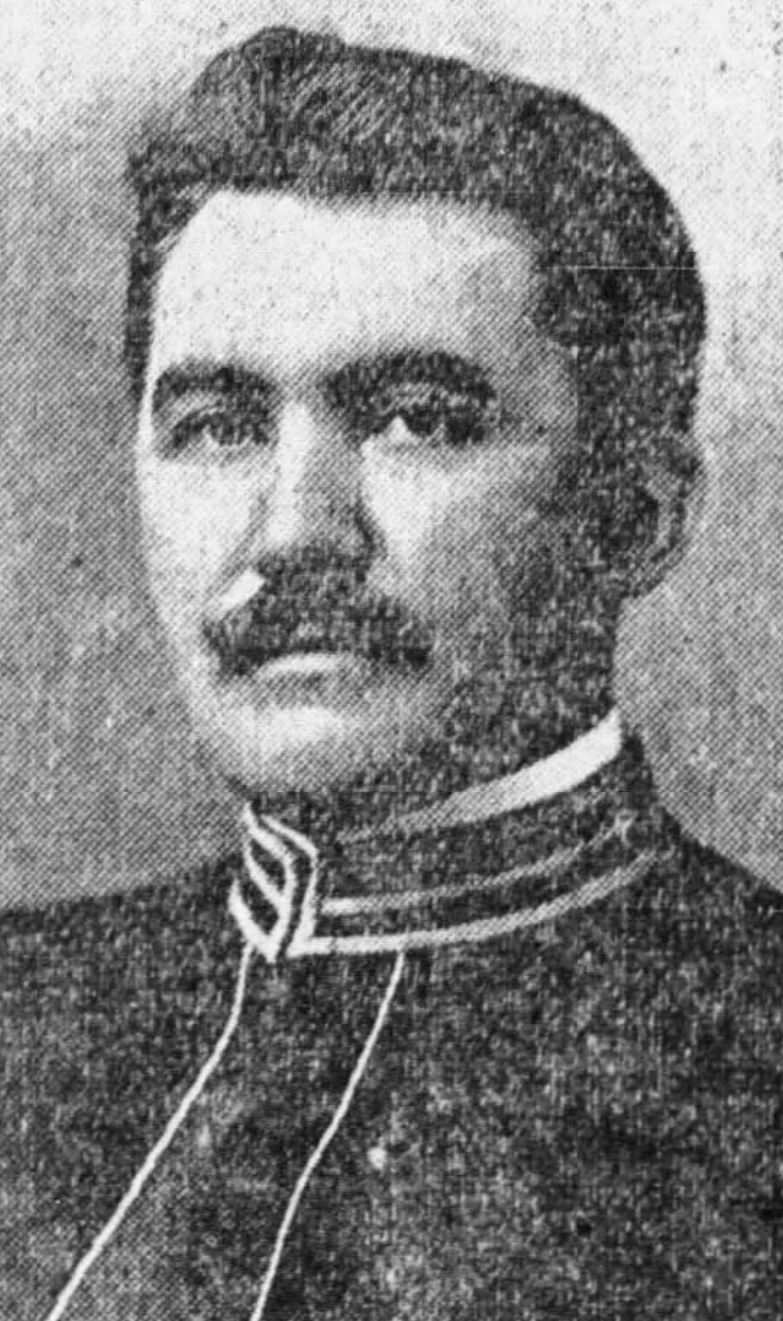
Edouarde as a band director in a 1908 newspaper

Following graduation, Edouarde returned to the United States. He was a violinist and assistant director of Allessandro Liberati's band. He then taught at the Cleveland Conservatory of Music as a professor of harmony and theory for several years. He conducted Knapp's Millionaire Band, the band of the 1st Regiment of the New York National Guard. They performed in Asbury Park, New Jersey, and Willow Grove, Pennsylvania. He also directed music for hotels in New York City, including Hotel Marlborough, Hotel Wolcott, Hotel Victoria and Holland House.

In 1912, Edouarde was convinced by Samuel Roxy Rothafel to go to the Regent Theatre in Manhattan. At the Regent, he composed the first musical score for a motion picture. Following this accomplishment, Edouarde and Rothafel were invited to join Manhattan's Strand Theatre at its opening and the pair continued their association. He served as the Strand's musical director. He remained in that role until 1927. Edouarde compiled photoplay music into scores for features at the Strand regularly, including The Hunchback of Notre Dame (1923 film) and The Private Life of Helen of Troy (1927).

Edouarde then worked in the field of synchronizing musical scores to sound film, among them Walt Disney's Steamboat Willie (1928). He also did work for Pathé-Van Beuren's Aesop's Fables cartoons from mid-1929 until early 1930, including A Close Call, Barnyard Melody and Tuning In.

On December 10, 1929, he fractured his left ankle in a fire at the Pathé Studios on Park Avenue and 124th Street that killed several people. He survived from leaping from a second-story window. This injury forced him to retire from conducting on stage.

== Personal life ==
Edouarde married Marian Doty of Rochester, New York, in 1904. They had a son, William Doty. He was friends with Daniel Frohman, B. A. Rolfe, John Philip Sousa and Adolph Zukor.

Edouarde had an operation in 1932. He died on December 8, 1932, aged 57, at his home in Locust, New Jersey. He was buried in Mount Hope Cemetery.
