= John Erskine (educator) =

American educator and novelist (1879–1951)

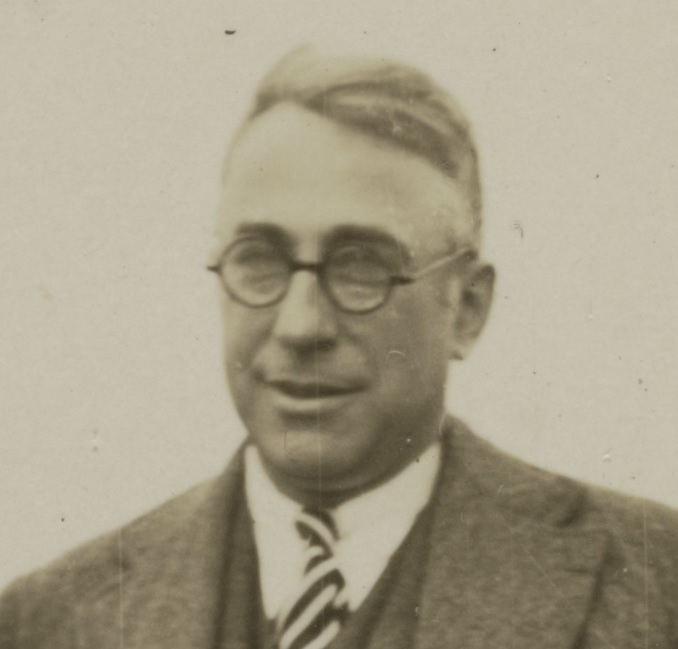
- Born: October 5, 1879; New York City, US
- Died: June 2, 1951 (aged 71); New York City, US
- Education: Columbia University
- Occupations: Educator and author
- Known for: Great books movement (1920 onwards); The Moral Obligation to Be Intelligent (1915)
- Spouse(s): Pauline Ives (m. 1910; div. 1945) Helen Worden Erskine (m. 1946; div. 1951)
- Relatives: Timothy Crouse (grandson); Lindsay Crouse (granddaughter); Zosia Mamet (great-granddaughter); Willa Mamet (great-granddaughter); John Peter Erskine (grandson); Ivan Erskine (grandson); Jenny Erskine (great-granddaughter); Rachel Courtney Erskine (great-granddaughter); Kelly Erskine (great-granddaughter); Becky Erskine (great-granddaughter); Harlan Erskine (great-grandson)

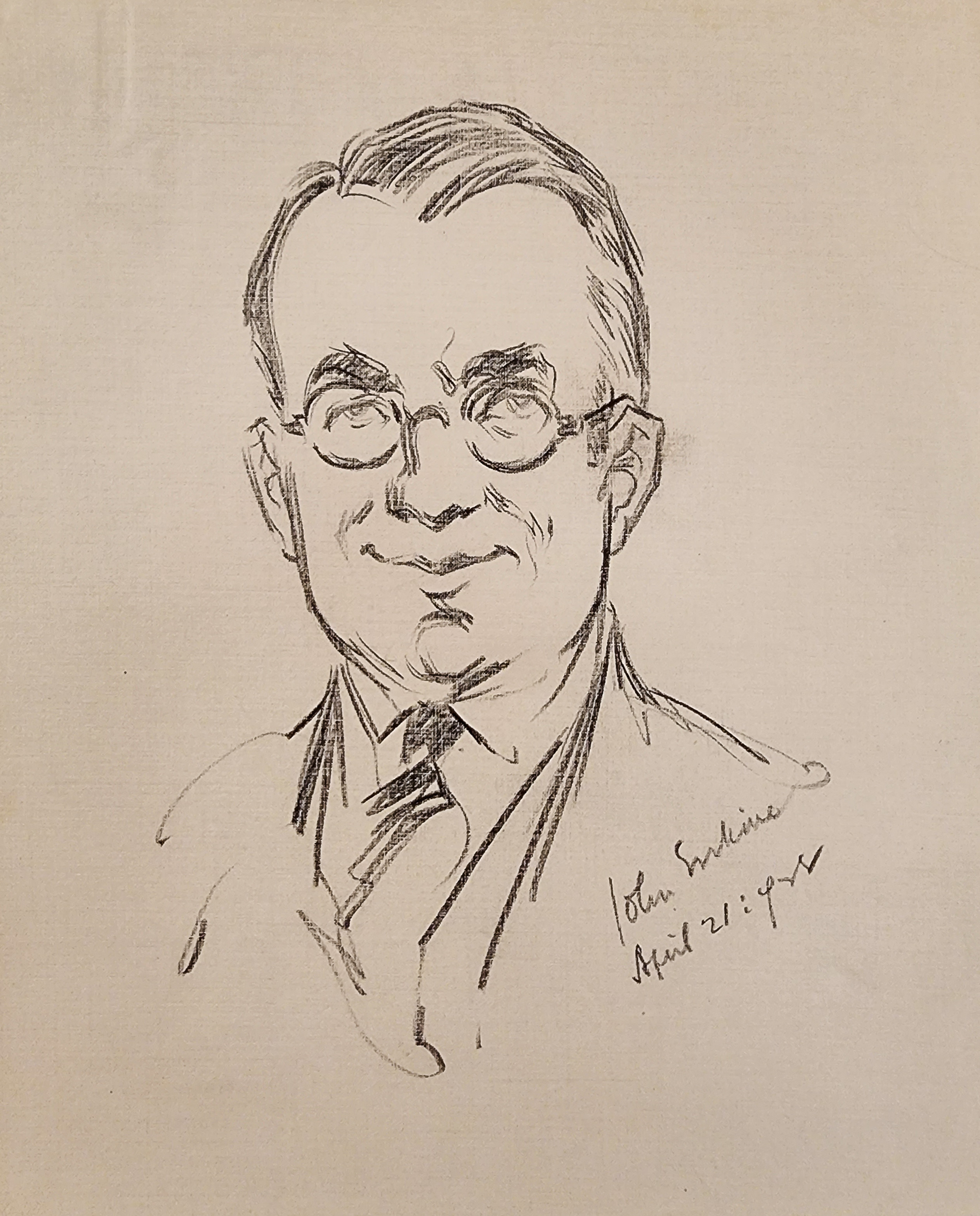
Signed drawing of John Erskine by Manuel Rosenberg 1926

John Erskine (October 5, 1879 – June 2, 1951) was an American educator and author, pianist and composer. He was an English professor at Amherst College from 1903 to 1909, followed by Columbia University from 1909 to 1937. He was the first president of the Juilliard School of Music. During his tenure at Columbia University he formulated the General Honors Course—responsible for inspiring the influential Great Books movement. He published over 100 books, novels, criticism, and essays including the essay "The Moral Obligation to Be Intelligent" (1915).

== Early life and education ==
Erskine was born in New York City, New York, the son of Eliza Jane (née Hollingsworth) and James Morrison Erskine. and raised in Weehawken, New Jersey. He graduated from Columbia University, B.A., 1900, M.A. 1901 and Ph.D., 1903 and D.Litt. 1929, besides D.Litt. degree from Amherst in 1923. At Columbia, John Erskine was a member of the Philolexian Society and later an honorary faculty member.

== Career ==
Erskine was English professor at Amherst College from 1903 to 1909, and subsequently taught at Columbia University from 1909 to 1937. In 1910, he led foundation of the Boar's Head Society for literature. In 1920, he instituted Columbia College's General Honors Course, a two-year undergraduate seminar that would later help inspire "Masterworks of Western Literature", now known commonly as "Literature Humanities", the second component of Columbia College's Core Curriculum. This course taught the classics in translation instead of the original Latin or Greek, a concept he elaborated in his noted essay The Moral Obligation to Be Intelligent. He found little support for the course from the senior faculty, and junior faculty members like Mark Van Doren and later after 1923, Mortimer Adler took up sections of the course. This course would later go on to inspire the Great Books movement, centered on the Great Books of the Western World. The course was discontinued in 1928, though later reconstituted. In 1929, Adler left Columbia to join University of Chicago, where he continued to work on the theme with Robert Hutchins, president of the university. Together they subsequently went on to found the Great Books of the Western World program and the Great Books Foundation.

Erskine co-wrote the 1900 Varsity Show at Columbia, writing the musical score for The Governor's Vrouw (1900), a two-act comic opera by Henry Sydnor Harrison and poet Melville Cane, who also wrote the lyrics. He won the Butler Medal in 1919. During his career Erskine published over 100 books, though as a writer he first received acclaim with his novel The Private Life of Helen of Troy (1925). This novel was made into a silent film by the same the name in 1927, directed by Alexander Korda. Other films based on his works included A Lady Surrenders (1930) by John M. Stahl, Bachelor of Arts (1934) by Louis King and The President's Mystery (1936) directed by Phil Rosen. The 1956 biopic of French noblewoman Diane de Poitiers entitled Diane was based on his story with a screenplay by Christopher Isherwood. He was also the author of numerous publications, including several humorous novels retelling myths and legends, besides essays, criticism, and two volumes of autobiography. These included Penelope's Man and Adam and Eve, Though He Knew Better.

Erskine was also an accomplished composer, pianist and musician. He wrote several books of music and the libretto for George Antheil's opera Helen Retires (1931), which was based on The Private Life of Helen of Troy. He was the first president of the Juilliard School of Music from 1928 to 1937. He was also director of the Metropolitan Opera Association, which runs the Metropolitan Opera, a noted opera company based in New York City.

Erskine is also credited with writing the subtitles for a number of films, including Sacha Guitry's Le Roman d'un tricheur (The Story of a Cheat) in 1938, Marcel Pagnol's The Baker's Wife in 1940 and Mario Camerini's The Spirit and the Flesh, an adaptation of Alessandro Manzoni's classic novel The Betrothed, in 1948.

To commemorate the seven hundredth anniversary of Roger Bacon, Erskine wrote A Pageant of the Thirteenth Century, a biographical play which was produced at Columbia University and published as a book by Columbia University Press in 1914. The Archives and Special Collections at Amherst College holds a collection of his papers. In 1946 he served as the first chairman of the American Writers Association.

== Personal life ==
He was married twice, to Pauline Ives (m. 1910–1945) and Helen Worden Erskine (m. 1946–1951). With his wife Pauline (Ives), he was the grandfather of actress Lindsay Crouse and the great-grandfather of actress Zosia Mamet. He died on June 2, 1951, in New York at the age of 71.

Erskine Place, a street in Co-op City in the New York City borough of The Bronx, was named after him.

== Bibliography ==
- The Elizabethan Lyric (1903)
- Selections from the Faerie Queene (1905)
- Actœon and Other Poems (1907)
- Leading American novelists (1910)
- Written English, with Helen Erskine (1910; revised edition, 1913)
- Selections from the Idylls of the King (1912)
- The Kinds of Poetry (1913)
- Poems of Wordsworth, Shelley, and Keats, with W. P. Trent (1914)
- Contemporary War Poems (Introduction) (1914)
- The Moral Obligation to Be Intelligent, and Other Essays (1915)
- Interpretations of Literature, by Lafcadio Hearn (edited and with an introduction by Erskine) (1915)
- Appreciations of Poetry, by Lafcadio Hearn (edited and with an introduction by Erskine) (1916)
- Life and Literature, by Lafcadio Hearn (edited and with an introduction by Erskine)(1917)
- The Shadowed Hour (1917)
- Democracy and Ideals (1920)
- Short History of American Literature; Based Upon the Cambridge History of American Literature (1922)
- The Little Disciple (1923)
- The Private Life of Helen of Troy (1925)
- Sonata (1925)
- Galahad: Enough of his life to explain his reputation (1926)
- Adam and Eve (1927)
- American Character (1927)
- Prohibition and Christianity, and Other Paradoxes (1927)
- The Delight of Great Books (1928)
- Penelope's Man (1928)
- Sincerity (1929)
- Uncle Sam in the Eyes of His Family (1930)
- Cinderella's Daughter, and Other Sequels and Consequences (1930)
- Tristan and Isolde: Restoring Palamede (1932)
- Bachelor of Arts (1934)
- The Influence of Women and Its Cure (1936)
- The Brief Hour of Francois Villon (1937)
- The Start of the Road (1938)
- Baker's Wife (1940)
- Give Me liberty; the Story of an Innocent Bystander (1940)
- Casanova's Women, Eleven Moments of a Year (1941)
- The Complete Life: A Guide to the Active Enjoyment of the Arts & of Living (1943)
- "What Is Music?" (1944)
- The Human Life of Jesus (1945)
- Venus, the Lonely Goddess (1949)
- My Life in Music (1950)

== See also ==
- Educational perennialism
- Western canon
- Harvard Classics
- Charles W. Eliot
