= The Moral Obligation to Be Intelligent =

1915 essay by John Erskine

The Moral Obligation to Be Intelligent and Other Essays
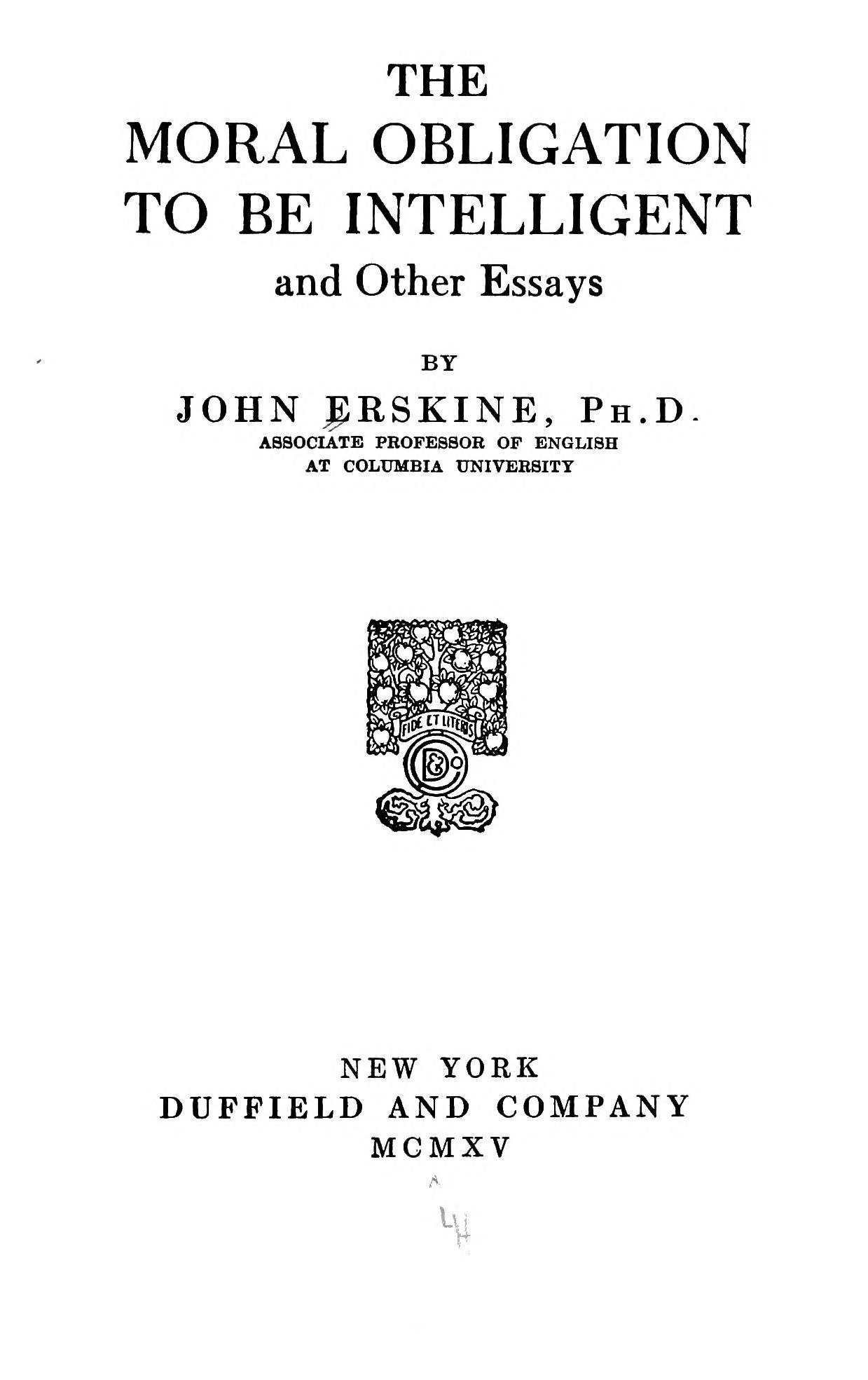
- Title page for The Moral Obligation to Be Intelligent and Other Essays (1915)
- Author: John Erskine
- Language: English
- Subject: Philosophy
- Published: 1915
- Publication place: United States (New York, Duffield)
- Text: The Moral Obligation to Be Intelligent and Other Essays at Wikisource

The Moral Obligation to Be Intelligent and Other Essays (1914), by John Erskine, is an essay first presented to Phi Beta Kappa society of Amherst College, where Erskine taught before working as a professor of English at Columbia University. Originally, "The Moral Obligation to Be Intelligent" was published in the quarterly magazine The Hibbert Journal, in 1914, and a year later was published in the essay collection The Moral Obligation to Be Intelligent, and Other Essays (1915).

Moreover, during his twenty-eight-year tenure (1909–1937) at Columbia University, Erskine formulated the General Honors Course. In the early 1920s he taught a great books course at Columbia, which later founded the influential Great Books movement.

== History ==
In 1963, "The Moral Obligation to Be Intelligent" was published in the Gateway to the Great Books, Volume 10: Philosophical Essays, a ten-volume book series published by Encyclopædia Britannica Inc.

In the 21st century, Erskine’s essay was the titular essay of the book The Moral Obligation to Be Intelligent: Selected Essays (2000), edited by the literary critic Lionel Trilling, of the Columbia University faculty, and featured an introduction by the literary critic Leon Wieseltier. Trilling had been a student of Erskine’s, and later taught the "Great Books" course; Trilling chose Erskine’s essay as the thematic basis and title for the book The Moral Obligation to Be Intelligent: Selected Essays.

== Work ==
- Erskine, John (1915). The Moral Obligation to be Intelligent: And Other Essays. Duffield.

== Bibliography ==
- Erskine, John (1921). The Moral Obligation to Be Intelligent and Other Essays (Revised ed.). Bobbs-Merrill.
- Graff, Gerald (1989). Professing Literature: An Institutional History. University of Chicago Press. ISBN 978-0-226-30604-9.
- Rubin, Joan Shelley (1992). Making of Middlebrow Culture. Univ of North Carolina Press. ISBN 978-0-8078-6426-5.
- Trilling, Lionel (2008). The Moral Obligation to Be Intelligent: Selected Essays. Northwestern University Press. ISBN 978-0-8101-2488-2.
- Kimmage, Michael (2009). The Conservative Turn: Lionel Trilling, Whittaker Chambers, and the lessons of anti-communism. Harvard University Press. ISBN 978-0-674-05412-7.
