= Glad Rag Doll (film) =

1929 film by Michael Curtiz

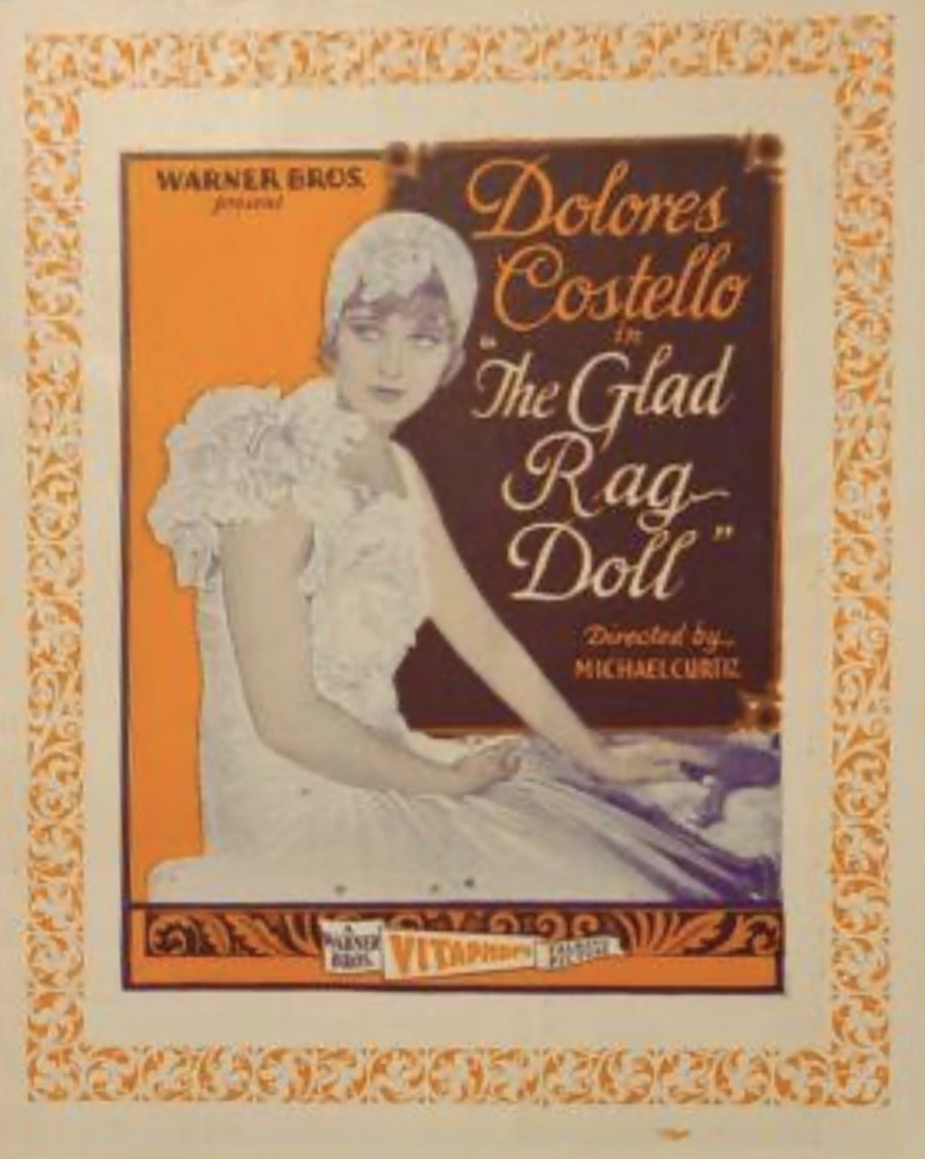
- Herald cover
- Directed by: Michael Curtiz
- Screenplay by: C. Graham Baker (& titles)
- Story by: Harvey Gates
- Starring: Dolores Costello; Ralph Graves
- Cinematography: Byron Haskin
- Music by: Milton Ager; Jack Yellen; Dan Dougherty; Cecil Copping (uncredited)
- Production company: Warner Bros. Pictures
- Distributed by: Warner Bros. Pictures
- Release date: May 4, 1929 (U.S.)
- Running time: 70 minutes
- Country: United States
- Languages: Sound (Part-Talkie); English intertitles
- Budget: $143,000
- Box office: $1,010,000

Glad Rag Doll is a 1929 American sound part-talkie pre-Code drama film directed by Michael Curtiz, and starring Dolores Costello, Ralph Graves, and Audrey Ferris. In addition to sequences with audible dialogue or talking sequences, the film features a synchronized musical score and sound effects, along with English intertitles. According to the film review in Harrison's Reports, 80 percent of the total running time featured dialogue. The soundtrack was recorded using the Vitaphone sound-on-disc system. The film's working title was Alimony Annie, but was changed match the title of the theme song. The theme song is entitled Glad Rag Doll both played and sung throughout the soundtrack.

== Plot ==
Annabel Lea, a chorus girl, rises to stardom in a New York revue thanks to a publicity stunt involving fellow actor Barry, orchestrated by the show's manager Foley and his press agent Irving. She is loved by Jimmy Fairchild, known as Broadway's playboy, though he is completely dominated by his older brother John, the stern and prideful head of the wealthy Fairchild family. The family also includes sister Bertha, Uncle Nathan, and Aunt Fairchild.

John, disapproving of Jimmy's interest in a showgirl, sends his attorney Sam Underlane to buy Annabel off. She rejects the offer. Enraged, John uses his influence to have her fired from the revue. In retaliation, Annabel marches into the Fairchild home with her maid Hannah and a stack of love letters from Jimmy, threatening to give them to the press. To avoid scandal, John reluctantly invites her to stay the weekend, hoping to retrieve the letters.

Annabel delights in making John and the Fairchilds uncomfortable, but she and John begin to develop a grudging respect—and attraction—for each other. At a lavish lawn party, Annabel brazenly tells a visiting admiral that she is marrying into the family. The admiral mistakenly assumes John is her fiancé, increasing the tension.

During her stay, Annabel discovers Aunt Fairchild is a kleptomaniac and stumbles into Uncle Nathan's room, catching him in an affair with Miss Peabody, the housekeeper. She also learns that Bertha has secretly married the chauffeur, Cooper, who sneaks into Annabel's room by mistake, thinking it still belongs to Bertha.

The next day, weary of the charade, Annabel prepares to return to New York. She turns down Jimmy, implying she never loved him. Jimmy suspects she has feelings for John, who soon confesses he loves her. But just then, Jimmy is discovered to have written $10,000 in bad checks. To save him, Annabel agrees to sell the love letters to Underlane for the exact amount.

When Underlane tells John what happened, he assumes Annabel is a gold-digger and throws her out. Later, in New York, newlyweds Nathan and Miss Peabody visit Annabel with a ticket to Europe, thanking her for helping them get together. She accepts. On board the ship, she finds herself in the bridal suite—and John appears with a minister. They marry at sea.

== Cast ==
- Dolores Costello as Annabel Lee
- Ralph Graves as John Fairchild
- Audrey Ferris as Bertha Fairchild
- Albert Gran as Nathan Fairchild
- Maude Turner Gordon as Aunt Fairchild
- Tom Ricketts as Admiral
- Claude Gillingwater as Sam Underlane
- Arthur Rankin as Jimmy Fairchild
- Dale Fuller as Miss Peabody
- Douglas Gerrard as Butler
- George Beranger as Barry, an actor
- Lee Moran as Press Agent
- Tom Kennedy as Manager
- Louise Beavers as Hannah

== Music ==
The film featured a theme song entitled "Glad Rag Doll" with words by Jack Yellen and music by Milton Ager and Dan Dougherty.

== Reception ==
According to Warner Bros records, the film earned $735,000 domestically and $275,000 foreign. This was a major financial success, was very profitable having been produced at a cost of $143,000.

== Preservation ==
Glad Rag Doll is one of many lost films of the 1920s; no prints or Vitaphone discs survive, but the film trailer survives.

== See also ==
- List of early sound feature films (1926–1929)

== Bibliography ==
- Rode, Alan K. Michael Curtiz: A Life in Film. University Press of Kentucky, 2017. ISBN 978-0813173917
