= Boar's Head Society =

Student conversazione society at Columbia University

- Formation: 1910; 116 years ago
- Founder: John Erskine
- Founded at: Columbia University
- Dissolved: 1970s
- Type: Student
- Purpose: Poetry
- Headquarters: Columbia University
- Location: New York City
- Key people: Lewis Mumford, Kenneth Burke, Alfred A. Knopf Sr., Randolph Bourne, Irwin Edman, Whittaker Chambers, Louis Zukofsky, Lionel Trilling, John Berryman, Daniel Hoffman, John Hollander, Allen Ginsberg, Terrence McNally
- Affiliations: Columbia Review

The Boar's Head Society (1910 – 1970s) was a student conversazione society devoted to poetry at Columbia University. It was an "adjunct to Columbia College's Philolexian Society ... The purpose of their new society was entirely creative: reading and commenting on each other's works."

== History ==
Boar's Head Well On Way:
Club Hears Noted Critic
Tuesday night in the Commons, Boar's Head, a new literary club formed among the university students interested in literature, listened to a talk given by Clayton Hamilton, dramatic critic on The Bookman. This was the third meeting of the new club and about forty students were present. It is the idea of Professor Erskine, of the English Department and other professors, that Boar's Head will develop into an active literary club. Membership will not be restricted, and any man in the University who is interested in writing or any form of literature may become a member by handing his name to L. Frank '12. At every meeting of the club prominent literary men in New York City will discuss questions of importance. Mr Hamilton last night, spoke on the poetry of Alfred Noyes interpolating many readings. The gathering was strictly informal, the members afterward conversing with the speaker and asking him questions. The name of the club, Boar's Head, will be recalled as the old-time inn when Falstaff made merry over his glass of ale. So, it is the desire of the professors that the club members may gather around a table at the meeting and comfort the inner man while at the same time entering into literary and social discussion.

John Erskine, English professor, formed the society. This connected the society through him to Columbia's student literary magazine, The Morningside Review (founded first as the Literary Monthly in 1815, renamed by Erskine in 1898, and renamed the Columbia Review in 1932). In 1931, it claimed to be the only organization on campus "devoted exclusively to poetry."

The society seems to have started during the 1909–1910 academic schoolyear, as in November 1909 it sponsored theatrical productions of Shakespeare's Comedy of Errors and Oscar Wilde's An Ideal Husband.

== Competitions ==
The society also held annual literary competitions and then published winners in the magazine. Competition judges included William Carlos Williams (and Lionel Trilling). Winners included John Berryman, Terrence McNally, John Hollander, and Allen Ginsberg.

At some point, the magazine took over the competition from the society.

== Members ==
Student members included:

- 1910s: Lewis Mumford (president), Kenneth Burke Alfred A. Knopf, Sr., Randolph Bourne, Irwin Edman, Lloyd R. Morris, Mark Van Doren
- 1920s: Whittaker Chambers, Louis Zukofsky, Samuel Theodore Hecht, Lionel Trilling, Eleanor Bell (first woman member)
- 1930s: John Berryman, Ralph de Toledano, Barry Ulanov
- 1940s: Daniel Hoffman, John Hollander, Allen Ginsberg
- 1950s: Terrence McNally

== Impact ==
The April 1935 issue of the Columbia Review, Lionel Trilling wrote "Boar's Heart: 25 Years" and Mark Van Doren wrote a "Note on Poetry".

In 2006, Hoffman reminisced, "When I returned to Columbia after the Second World War, I joined the Boar's Head Society, which was a little group of poets. In those days, colleges didn't like poets to do anything, so we ponied up the hundred bucks and invited him" (W. H. Auden).

== See also ==
- Columbia University
- John Erskine
- Mark Van Doren
