= The Private Life of Helen of Troy (book) =

1925 novel by John Erskine

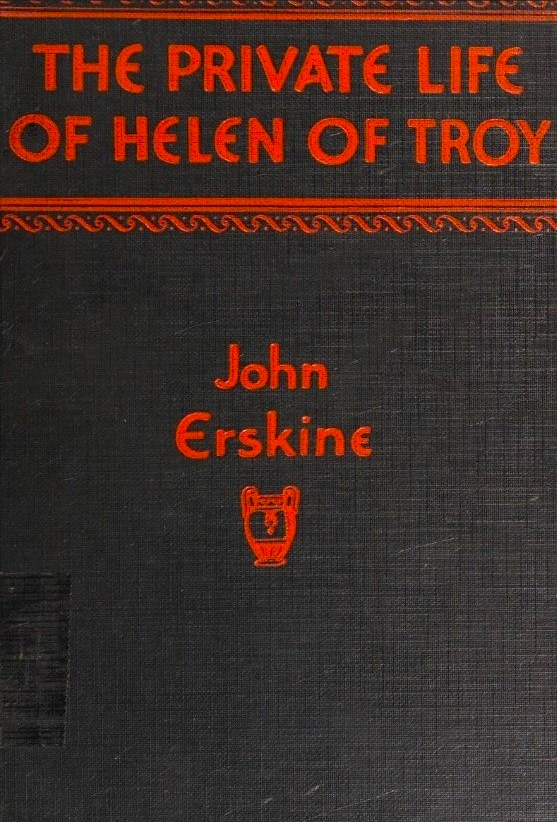
Cover of the 1925 edition

The Private Life of Helen of Troy by John Erskine was a novel published in 1925 by Bobbs Merrill. It was the best-selling work of American fiction in 1926, according to the Publishers' Weekly. The book was adapted from the Greek legend of Helen of Troy and follows the famous woman's life after the burning of Troy.

== Plot summary ==
In the beginning, Menelaus - Helen's husband - leaves Troy in search of her and plans to kill her for all the trouble her beauty has caused. Instead, the two set out on a week-long voyage back to Sparta. Menelaus questions why his wife ran away from Sparta to begin with, saying that he did not believe her involvement with Paris was enough. Once at home, Helen talks with Charita and tells her that in the beginning, she thought she loved Paris and that is why she ran away with him, but she realized she only loved something he made her think of, and in the end, she only felt sorry for him. She goes on to say that she felt sorry for Paris because she could see he was "lost in the madness" just as she was. She tells her that marriage starts with love, but the people in the marriage get lost along the way and calls marriages fatal errors.

The book follows Helen's family and how she navigates friendships, her marriage, and parenting her children after what many in her life call, 'the scandal.'

== Themes ==
Helen is a progressive woman by American standards in the 1930s, and would certainly be considered radical in ancient Greece. She defends her decision to run away with Paris and even encourages other women in the book to embrace their sexuality. Because of this, many have read the book as a satirical nod to gender politics. There is also a common feminist reading of the book because of Helen's attitude toward marriage and sexuality.

Because the book was published only five years after the Nineteenth Amendment to the United States Constitution was ratified, it can be argued that a cultural focus on feminism and women's suffrage influenced why this book was so well received. Helen, in the book, represented a new kind of woman, who did what she wanted rather than what she was told, and defied male authority, which can be argued perpetuated the book's success.

== Film ==
The book was adapted into a silent film The Private Life of Helen of Troy in 1927, written by Gerald Duffy and directed by Alexander Korda. The film, and Duffy, were nominated for an Academy Award for Best Title Writing in 1929 (the first year the awards were held).
