= Daniel Hoffman =

American poet and essayist

- Born: Daniel Gerard Hoffman; April 3, 1923; New York City, New York, U.S.
- Died: March 30, 2013 (aged 89); Haverford, Pennsylvania, U.S.
- Education: Columbia University (BA, MA, PhD)
- Spouse: Elizabeth McFarland

Daniel Gerard Hoffman (April 3, 1923 – March 30, 2013) was an American poet, essayist, and academic. He was appointed the twenty-second Poet Laureate Consultant in Poetry to the Library of Congress in 1973.

== Early life and education ==
Hoffman was born in New York City. During World War II, he served in the Army Air Corps, where he served stateside as a technical writer and as the editor of an aeronautical research journal, experiences detailed in his memoir Zone of the Interior. He was educated at Columbia University, earning a B.A. (1947), an M.A. (1949), and a Ph.D. (1956). At Columbia, he was a member of the Boar's Head Society and the Philolexian Society.

== Career ==
In 1954, Hoffman published his first collection of poetry, An Armada of Thirty Whales. This collection was chosen by W. H. Auden as part of the Yale Series of Younger Poets, and Auden commended it in his introduction as "providing a new direction for nature poetry in the post-Wordsworthian world." He has since published ten additional collections of poetry, a memoir, and seven volumes of criticism. Reviewing Beyond Silence in The New York Times Book Review in 2003, Eric McHenry found Hoffman a poet of remarkable consistency, "no less joyful or engaged at 80 than he was at 25."

Hoffman taught at Columbia University, Swarthmore College, and the University of Pennsylvania. He retired from the latter as Felix Schelling Professor of English Emeritus, and its Philomathean Society in 1996 published an anthology of poetry in honor of his efforts to bring contemporary poets to give readings in their halls. He was a chancellor emeritus of the Academy of American Poets. From 1988 to 1999, he served as Poet in Residence at the Cathedral of St. John the Divine in New York City, where he administered the American Poets' Corner.

== Awards ==
Hoffman won the Hazlett Memorial Award in 1984.

He won the Aiken Taylor Award for Modern American Poetry from The Sewanee Review in 2003.

He won the 2005 Arthur Rense Poetry Prize "for an exceptional poet" from the American Academy of Arts and Letters.

He won the Memorial Medal of the Magyar P.E.N. for his translations of contemporary Hungarian poetry, and several grants and fellowships, including those from the Guggenheim Foundation and the National Endowment for the Humanities.

He received an honorary degree from Swarthmore College in 2005.

== Personal life ==
Hoffman was married for 57 years to Elizabeth McFarland (1922–2005), a poet herself as well as the poetry editor of Ladies' Home Journal, from 1948 until that magazine stopped publishing verse in 1961. From 1965 the couple spent summers in Brooksville, Maine. In 2008 Orchises Press brought out a selection of McFarland's poems, Over the Summer Water, with an introduction by Hoffman.

Hoffman was one of Philadelphia's Franklin Inn Club notable members.

Daniel Hoffman was one of the named plaintiffs in "Authors Guild vs. Google" (2005), the purpose of which was to prevent Google from providing a complete searchable index of extant books.

== Death ==
Hoffman died in an assisted living facility in Haverford, Pennsylvania, on March 30, 2013. He was 89.

== Bibliography ==
- Paul Bunyan, Last of the Frontier Demigods (1952)
- An Armada of Thirty Whales (1954)
- The Poetry of Stephen Crane (1957)
- A Little Geste and Other Poems (1960)
- Form and Fable in American Fiction (1961)
- The City of Satisfactions (1963)
- Barbarous Knowledge: Myth in the Poetry of Yeats, Graves, and Muir (1967)
- Striking the Stones (1968)
- Broken Laws (1970)
- Poe Poe Poe Poe Poe Poe Poe (1971), 1973 finalist for the National Book Award
- The Center of Attention (1974)
- Brotherly Love (1981), finalist for the 1982 National Book Award and 1981 National Book Critics Circle Award
- HangGliding from Helicon: New and Selected Poems, 1948–1988 (1988), winner of the 1988 Paterson Poetry Prize
- Faulkner's Country Matters: Folklore and Fable in Yoknapatawpha (1989)
- Words to Create a World: Interviews, Essays, and Reviews on Contemporary Poetry (1993)
- Middens of the Tribe (1995)
- Zone of the Interior: A Memoir, 1942–1947 (2000)
- Darkening Water (2002)
- A Play of Mirrors (2002), a translation from the Italian of Ruth Domino's poems
- Beyond Silence: Selected Shorter Poems, 1948–2003 (2003)
- Makes You Stop and Think: Sonnets (2005)
- The Whole Nine Yards: Longer Poems :Louisiana State University Press (2009) ISBN 978-0-8071-3414-6
- Next to Last Words: Poems :Louisiana State University Press (2013) ISBN 978-0-8071-5022-1
