= The Private Life of Helen of Troy =

1927 film by Alexander Korda

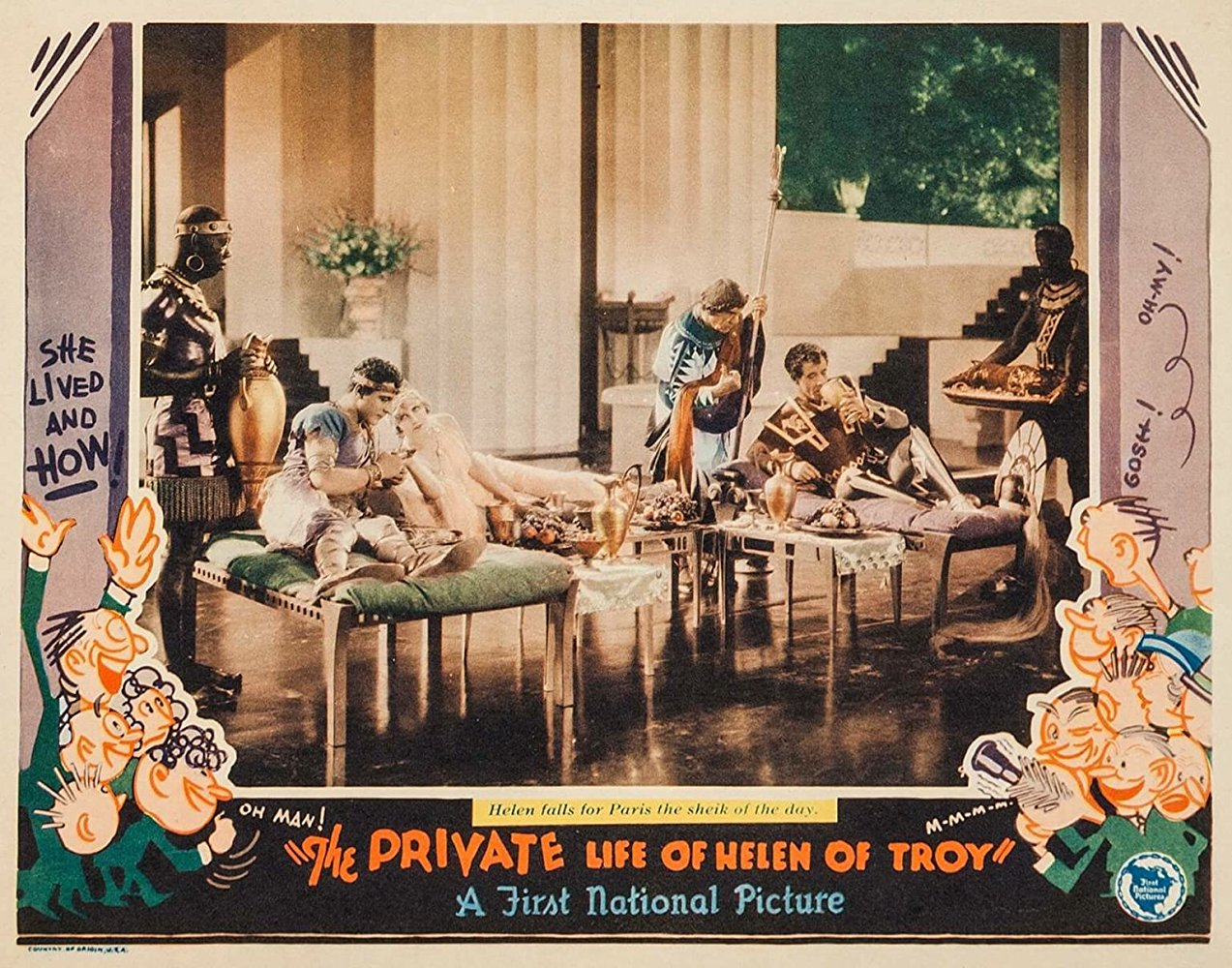
- Directed by: Alexander Korda
- Written by: Gerald C. Duffy (intertitles); Ralph Spence (intertitles); Casey Robinson (intertitles)
- Based on: The Private Life of Helen of Troy by John Erskine
- Produced by: Richard A. Rowland
- Starring: María Corda; Lewis Stone; Ricardo Cortez
- Cinematography: Lee Garmes; Sidney Hickox
- Edited by: Harold Young
- Music by: Carl Edouarde; Cecil Copping (NYC premiere, uncredited)
- Distributed by: First National Pictures
- Release dates: December 9, 1927 (NYC); January 8, 1928 (Nationwide)
- Running time: 87 minutes
- Country: United States
- Language: Silent (English intertitles)

The Private Life of Helen of Troy is a 1927 American silent comedy adventure film about Helen of Troy based on the 1925 novel of the same name by John Erskine, and adapted to screen by Gerald Duffy. The film was directed by Alexander Korda and starred María Corda as Helen, Lewis Stone as Menelaus, and Ricardo Cortez as Paris.

== Plot ==
King Menelaus shakes soldiers' hands. He finds royal duties, as well as his wife Helen's planned social activities, tedious, and plans fishing trips. Menelaus' preparations for a relaxed night in is contrasted with Helen's preparations for a social night out. Helen wants to go to the theater but Menelaus is resistant, though he eventually relents. After a glamorous evening, Helen is invited by Paris to dine at the palace the next day. The two elope and Paris acts as porter, carrying wardrobe trunks and boxes. Menelaus is not upset but instead celebrates the future fishing opportunities that will come without a wife.

In Troy, Helen buys spectacular clothing. Because she strains the Spartan economy by buying all her clothes from Troy, the Spartans go to war. Menelaus suggests letting the Trojans keep Helen, but the soldiers persuade him to take action while Eteoneus bitterly updates him on the fishing forecast. The Trojan soldiers, too, welcome war, as they see it as an opportunity to display their fashionable new uniforms. As Helen puzzles over design details with a male dressmaker, soldiers excitedly shout "we're going to the front", which direct her attention to the insufficiently low neckline at the front of the dress.

Troy falls (Note: This happens off-screen. A deleted scene (surviving in one reel) depicts the Trojan War in a scene in which Troy's dress shops are attacked.) and Menelaus welcomes victory, not because of the return of his wife but because of the opportunity it affords to go fishing, as he believes he has made her "realize a wife’s place", a belief which is supported when Helen announces her intention of doing housework. Telemachus visits unexpectedly to see the beauty of Helen, and Menelaus confidently assures him that she would never do it again. His assurance is soon contradicted when Helen enters in a mini-dress, wearing pearls, and gold headband as she flirts with Telemachus. Menelaus is enthused as he realizes the possibility for fishing if he is wifeless once again. Leaving Helen and Telemachus, he tells Eteoneus they will go fishing the next day, as it "looks as though Helen will be taking a little trip to Ithaca", the home of Telemachus.

== Cast ==
- María Corda as Helen
- Lewis Stone as Menelaus
- Ricardo Cortez as Paris
- George Fawcett as Eteoneus
- Alice White as Adraste
- Bill Elliott as Telemachus
- Tom O'Brien as Ulysses
- Bert Sprotte as Achilles
- Mario Carillo as Ajax
- Charles Puffy as Malapokitoratoreadetos
- George Kotsonaros as Hector
- Emilio Gorgato as Sarpedon
- Constantine Romanoff as Aeneas
- Alice Adair as Aphrodite
- Helen Fairweather as Athena
- Virginia Thomas as Hera
- Agostino Borgato (uncredited)
- Sonia Karlov (uncredited)
- Inez Marion (uncredited)
- Jack Stambaugh as Extra (uncredited)
- John Westwood as Extra (uncredited)
- Clifford Ingram as Chariot Driver (uncredited)
- Gusztáv Pártos as Nobleman (uncredited)

== Reception ==
Released at the end of the silent film era, The Private Life of Helen of Troy was nominated for an Academy Award in 1929, the year of the Awards' inception, in the category of Best Title Writing. Duffy died on June 25, 1928, and was the first person to be posthumously nominated for an Academy Award.

That same year, the first "talkie", The Jazz Singer, received an honorary award for introducing sound to film, and the category for which The Private Life of Helen of Troy was nominated was dropped by the second Academy Awards.

== Preservation ==
Two sections from the beginning and end, running about 27–30 minutes in total, are reportedly all that survive of The Private Life of Helen of Troy; they are preserved by the British Film Institute.

== See also ==
- List of incomplete or partially lost films
