= Cecil Copping =

- Born: July 6, 1888; Lisbon, New Hampshire, U.S.
- Died: January 4, 1966 (aged 77); Los Angeles, California, U.S.
- Occupation: Film composer
- Years active: 1923–1939

Cecil Sprague Copping (6 July 1888 in Lisbon, New Hampshire, United States – 4 January 1966 in Los Angeles, California, United States) was an American composer of film music and a miscellaneous crew. He composed background music to nine movies and worked as a miscellaneous crew in five movies in 1920s-1930s.

== Biography ==
Early in his life and career he lived in Rockland, Maine, where his parents were music teachers. Here, he was a member of the Young People's Christian Union and was musical director of the Farwell Opera House in 1908-1909.

In the 1920s he was active as a composer and arranger in film and Broadway in New York City.

== Partial filmography ==
- The Hunchback of Notre Dame (1923) The original film was silent; Copping composed one of the soundtracks for a later re-release.
- The Sea Hawk (1924)
- The Lost World (1925) Composed the music for the live orchestra premiere of this silent film at New York's Astor Theatre.
- The Private Life of Helen of Troy (1927)
- Chicago (1927) Composed the accompany music for the premiere of this silent film in New York.
- The Patent Leather Kid (1927)
- Lilac Time (1928)
- The Divine Lady (1928) Composed the film's music (which was distributed by the Vitaphone process)
- Glad Rag Doll (1929)
- The Hottentot (1929)
- Her Private Life (1929)
- The Isle of Lost Ships (1929)
- Drag (1929)
- The Love Racket (1929)
- Loose Ankles (1930)
- No, No, Nanette (1930), uncredited composer
- Misbehaving Ladies (1931)
- Gone with the Wind (1939), uncredited orchestrator
