= Irwin Edman =

American philosopher (1896–1954)

Irwin Edman (November 28, 1896 – September 4, 1954) was an American philosophy professor.

== Biography ==
Irwin Edman was born in New York City to Jewish parents. He grew up in the Morningside Heights neighborhood of Manhattan, adjacent to Columbia University, with which he was to be affiliated his entire adult life. Edman spent his high-school years at Townsend Harris Hall, a New York high school for superior pupils. He then attended Columbia University, where he graduated Phi Beta Kappa and earned his bachelor's degree in 1917 and his Ph.D. in 1920. During his student years at Columbia he was a member of the Boar's Head Society. He became a professor of philosophy at Columbia, and later was head of the philosophy department. In 1945 the United States Department of State and the Brazilian government sponsored a series of lectures he gave in Rio de Janeiro.

In 1953, Edman was elected vice president of the National Institute of Arts and Letters (later succeeded by the American Academy of Arts and Letters).

Edman published books on philosophy as well as poetry and some fiction. His books include Philosopher’s Holiday, Richard Kane Looks at Life, Four Ways of Philosophy, Philosopher's Quest, and Arts and the Man: An Introduction to Aesthetics.

He died of a heart attack on September 4, 1954, in New York City.

== Bibliography ==
- Arthur Schopenhauer: The World As Will And Idea
- Arts and the man: a short introduction to aesthetics (1939)
- Candle in the Dark : A Postscript to Despair (1939)
- Don Quixote: The Ingenious Man of La Mancha (Introduction)
- Ecclesiastes, with an Essay by Irwin Edman; Odyssey Press, New York, 1946
- Emerson's Essays, First & Second Series Complete in One Volume
- Epictetus. Discourses and Enchiridion. Based on the Translation of Thomas...
- Fountainheads of Freedom: The Growth of the Democratic Idea, with Herbert W. Schneider
- Human Traits and Their Social Significance
- John Dewey: his contribution to the American tradition (as editor)
- Landmarks for beginners in philosophy
- Machiavelli: The Prince (Introduction and Preface) (1954)
- Meditations. Marcus Aurelius and His Times. The Transition from Paganism to Christianity (1945)
- Philosopher's Holiday (1938)
- Philosopher's Quest (1947)
- The Mind Of Paul (1935)
- The Philosophy of Plato. Jowett Translation
- The Philosophy of Santayana
- The Philosophy of Schopenhauer (1928)
- The Uses of Philosophy
- The Works of Plato
- The World, the Arts and the Artist
- Under Whatever Sky (1951)

=== Poetry ===
Collections

- Poems

List of poems

Title	Year	First published	Reprinted/collected
Brief introduction to the problems of philosophy	1950	Edman, Irwin (February 4, 1950). "Brief introduction to the problems of philosophy". The New Yorker. 25 (50): 32.	

———————
