= Allessandro Liberati =

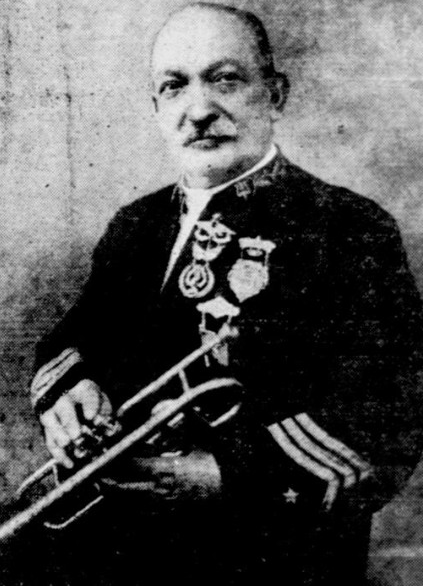
- Born: August 24, 1847; Frascati, Italy
- Died: November 6, 1927 (aged 80); New York City, USA
- Occupation(s): Cornetist, Bandmaster, Composer
- Notable work: Felice, Kansas City Star March

Allessandro Liberati (1847–1927) was a cornet player and virtuoso. Active mainly in the late 19th century and the early 20th century, he was also known for being a respectable bandleader for (among others) his World Renowned Liberati Band, as well as for the composition of Felice, and the Kansas City Star March. He died in 1927.

== Early life ==
Allessandro studied and practiced cornet at an early age. It is very likely that the first lessons Liberati received were from his father Carlo and mother Felicetta, both of whom were considered to be very talented musically. His father was skilled on the bugle and the keyed trumpet. When he was fourteen, Allessandro made his public debut on the cornet, an aria from Il trovatore. He enlisted in the Papal Body Guard in the Vatican in 1864, and he played with the First Cacciatori Band of Rome for two years, and in 1866, he performed on the bugle in Garibaldi's army. He enlisted in the French Foreign Legion in 1871 and was captured as a prisoner of war in the Franco-Prussian War.

== Career ==
From 1866 to 1872, Liberati performed throughout Italy whilst conducting bands and teaching the cornet. In 1872, he traveled to the west for three years where he became the bandmaster of artillery and soloist to His Excellency the Earl of Dufferin, Canada. The Perth Courier reports that Liberati was leading the Fountain Engine Brass Band (which will become the Perth Citizens Band), performing in concerts and making plans to open a store in the community in November 1873. He left in early 1874. He travelled through populous parts of British-inhabited parts of Canada, playing as a cornet soloist within a military band. Patrick Gilmore heard of Liberati and asked him to be a special soloist for his Peace Jubilee the same year. Soon he became director and cornet soloist of all Canadian Artillery Bands. In 1875, he was asked to be the director of the Michigan National Guard Band and Detroit's police bugle band.

One year later in 1876, he became an official American citizen and his bands were asked to perform at the nation's Centennial Exposition in Philadelphia. Here he could hear many outstanding musical organizations, like Gilmore's Band and Jacques Offenbach's Orchestra. In 1877, he joined J. Thomas Baldwin's Boston Cadet Band as cornet soloist, playing at the opening of the Brighton Beach Hotel on Coney Island. Carlo A. Cappa persuaded Gilmore to hire Allessandro as an alternate cornet soloist in 1878, and by 1879, he was equally billed with such names as Arbuckle, Bent, Emerson, and Levy. Liberati may have been hired by Gilmore as a "hedge" against a possible feud between Levy and Arbuckle.

During the winter seasons of 1879 and 1880, Liberati played first trumpet (on cornet) with the Philharmonic Society of New York.

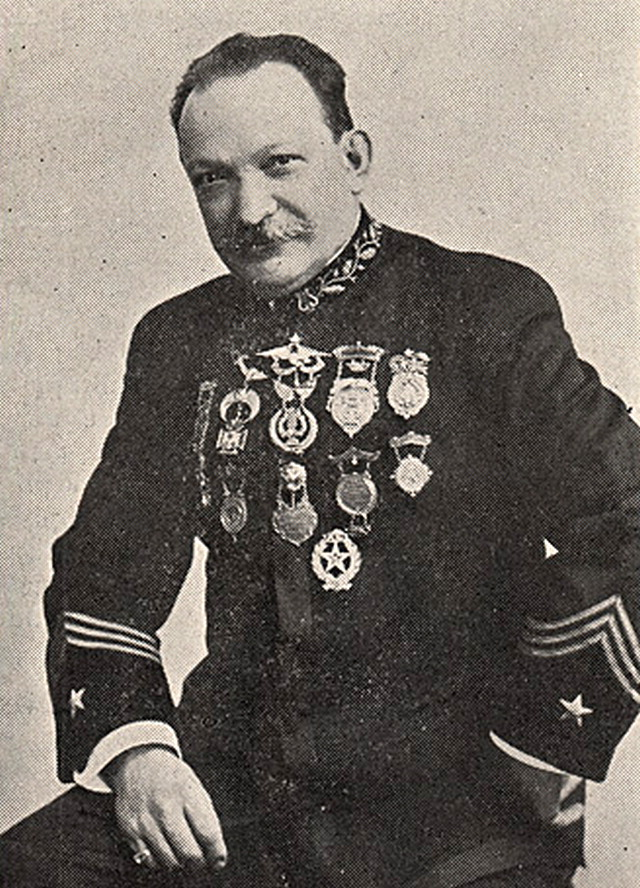
Liberati in military outfit

He was special soloist at the 1878, '79, and '80 Interstate Expositions of Chicago, and in 1881, special soloist at the exposition in Central Park. He was engaged as soloist in various venues, e.g., the 1881 Yorktown Centennial Celebration (likely with Harvey Dodworth's Thirteenth Regiment Band), the West End Resort in New Orleans (1883), and the Southern Exposition in Louisville, Kentucky (1883). He performed for Grover Cleveland's visit to the Seventh Regiment Armory in New York, and for Cardinal Tascheru's visit to Quebec, Canada on June 20, 1886.

In 1886, Liberati conducted one of the bands at the Twenty-third Triennial Conclave of the Knights Templar in St. Louis, Missouri. The event was organized by Patrick Gilmore to benefit the children at a home for widows and orphans. Also in that same year, he performed solos at Golden Gate Park in San Francisco, and he was Bandmaster of the Seventy-first Regimental National Guard Band in New York City.

In 1889, Liberati formed his own band and billed it "The World Renowned Liberati Band". One of the many responsibilities of the group was to play between acts of the C. D. Hess Grand Opera Company. The World Renowned Liberati Band traveled extensively and developed a reputation in the United States and Canada. Liberati and his band traveled extensively around the country, playing especially in Kansas City, Missouri in the summer of 1891. He was the composer of the Kansas City Star March.

In 1895, he became known for establishing among the first circus bands when he began traveling with the noted Ringling Brothers, for whom he opened performances.

In September 1899, his re-organized Grand Military Band of 112 pieces was chosen by the Grand Army of the Republic to lead a parade through the streets of Philadelphia in honor of the Union Army Veterans of the city. Riding on a black stallion and wearing his uniform decorated with many medals, Liberati performed on a golden cornet while directing the band. He headed them for many years, until as late as 1922 in Tulsa, Oklahoma. Liberati also played cornet solos at Washington Park on the Delaware, near Philadelphia in the summer of 1902. Later that year, he went on two concert tours, the first one of major cities between Philadelphia and Dallas, Texas, where he played at the State Fair; the second terminating in New York City, just before Christmas.

One of his more famous students was Albertus L. Meyers, cornetist for Sousa's Band, who left Sousa after an engagement at Willow Grove Park on September 13, 1925, one of America's premier music venues of the early 20th century. Meyers then became the long-time conductor of the Allentown Band.

Allessandro played with false teeth for years. For Herbert L. Clarke, Bent and Liberati were one of the best soloists he ever heard. Allessandro also made a number of recordings for Edison in the 1890s.

== Musical style ==
Liberati had a style peculiarly his own. Before him had been Matthew Arbuckle, who was notable for his mastery over tone, and whose artistic interpretations and versatile musicianship won the admiration and appreciation of even the most exacting. Then Levy attracted the attention the world with his pyrotechnics. This left a distinct field for the discerning Liberati, and he was quick to grasp it. He applied himself to the delicate soft staccato, making it a veritable specialty of his, and Levy's rubato was the bane of his accompanists and often puzzled his hearers; so Liberati adopted a method of utmost precision. Having developed a style his own, Liberati composed solos to display it to the best achievable advantage. Noted specific ones were cited as "wanting in depth", but "pleasing and sometimes novel."

Liberati's system of acquiring his style is founded on the bedrock of virtuosoship: persevering, persistent, faithful work of the severest nature. With a determination and energy truly admirable he devoted all his spare moments to practice. His first step was to perfect the 'attack of the tone.' Then, with a metronome as his guide in tempo, he practiced scales in all keys—always in a light staccato—until he could play them with absolute precision, in both time and tune. He stated, "You may think you play a scale perfectly but try it with a metronome and you will find out that you don't. I thought I did until I began practicing with a metronome." Although then regarded as an artist, Liberati learned that he could not play a simple scale with evenness, but by diligence he gained the point he sought. He was forced to begin at a slow tempo but gradually increasing it, he rapidly acquired the desired precision at any tempo he found necessary.

Breathing soon attracted his attention. According to Liberati, "It is an easy matter to hold a tone for say twenty seconds, isn't it? Now try to play detached tones for twenty seconds and do you do it? Well I found that something was wrong because I couldn't play half, not even a fourth as long as I could hold a tone. When you play you must let only the amount of air pass the lips that is needed to produce the tone—no more. I went to work on this and now I can play an air or an allegro exercise as long as I can hold a tone."

As a bandmaster, he is marked by the same painstaking care and thorough attention to detail that characterize his solo playing. Liberati was noted as the "hardest working soloist before the public", and it was said that "no task was too severe or forbidding for him and he deserves all the success he has enjoyed."

== Personal life ==
On June 2, 1903, while traveling in Kansas City, Liberati was involved in a car collision. The New York Times reported "An automobile containing Signor Liberati, the cornet virtuoso, and several prominent business men, was struck by a street car today while touring in the outskirts of the city. The machine was completely wrecked and all of the occupants were cut and bruised."

Described as being quiet, easygoing, and sociable, he was distinguished as very self-important, and he was noted as saying that "there is one cornetist in the world and that is Allessandro Liberati." He proclaimed himself above Jules Levy, and he was not recorded as seeing Levy as a "rival." He claimed the ability to teach him.

He married his wife, Elsie, in 1881. They lived in New York and had one daughter.
