= Volpone (opera) =

Opera by George Antheil

Volpone is a comic opera written in 1949–52 to a libretto by Alfred Perry based on the play by Ben Jonson, was George Antheil's third opera. It was first performed in Manhattan in 1953 at the Cherry Lane Theatre.

== Synopsis ==
A 16th-century man pretends to be dying to obtain money from his prospective heirs.
