= Transatlantic (opera) =

Opera by George Antheil

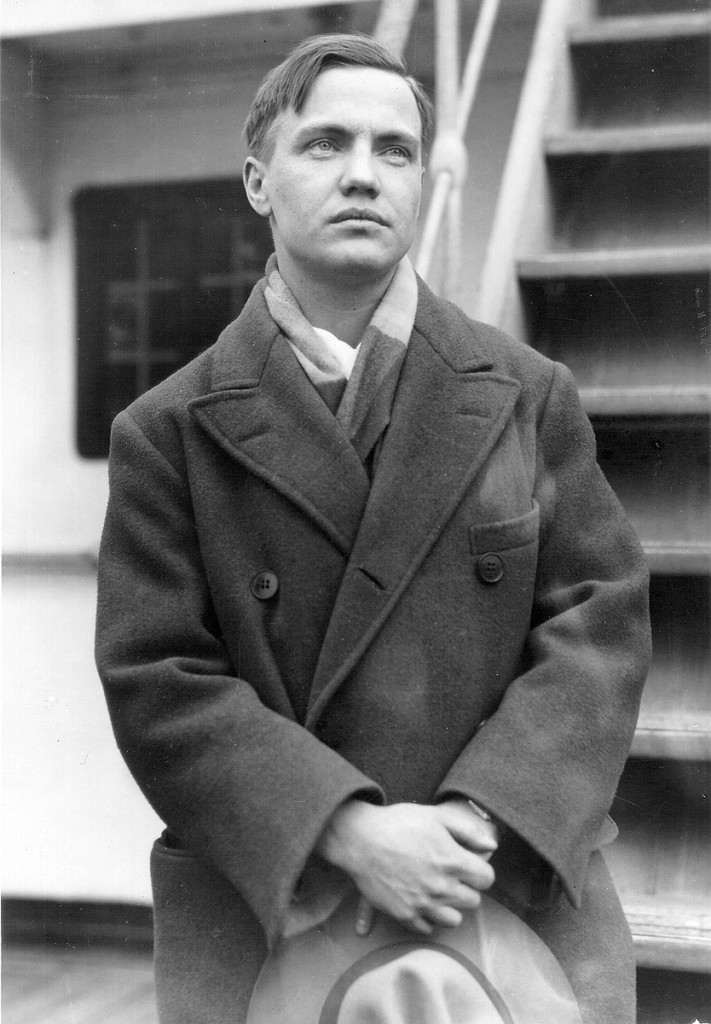
George Antheil arriving in New York in 1927

Transatlantic (aka The People's Choice) is a Grand Opera in 3 acts by George Antheil written in 1928 to a libretto by the composer. It was premiered in Frankfurt on May 25, 1930. Though a critical success the work ran for only 6 performances and was not performed again during Antheil's lifetime.

It has been subsequently revived in 1998 by the Minnesota Opera, and 2002 by the Schleswig-Holstein Landestheater of Flensburg, Germany.

The work is scored for a large orchestra with soloists and chorus.

== Synopsis ==
The plot is a political satire in which a corrupt American oil baron (Ajax) recruits a charismatic, enthusiastic, cooperative man (Hector Jackson) to run for president. Ajax employs a seductress (Helen) to further motivate Hector but Helen falls for him. In an attempt to control this situation Ajax forces Helen to marry a gigolo (Jason). Further complications ensue when the campaign treasurer (Leo) also falls for Helen and embezzles $1 million from Ajax' funds to buy her a diamond ring. The American public becomes sufficiently enthralled with Hector to vote him into office.
