= George Antheil =

American composer and inventor (1900–1959)

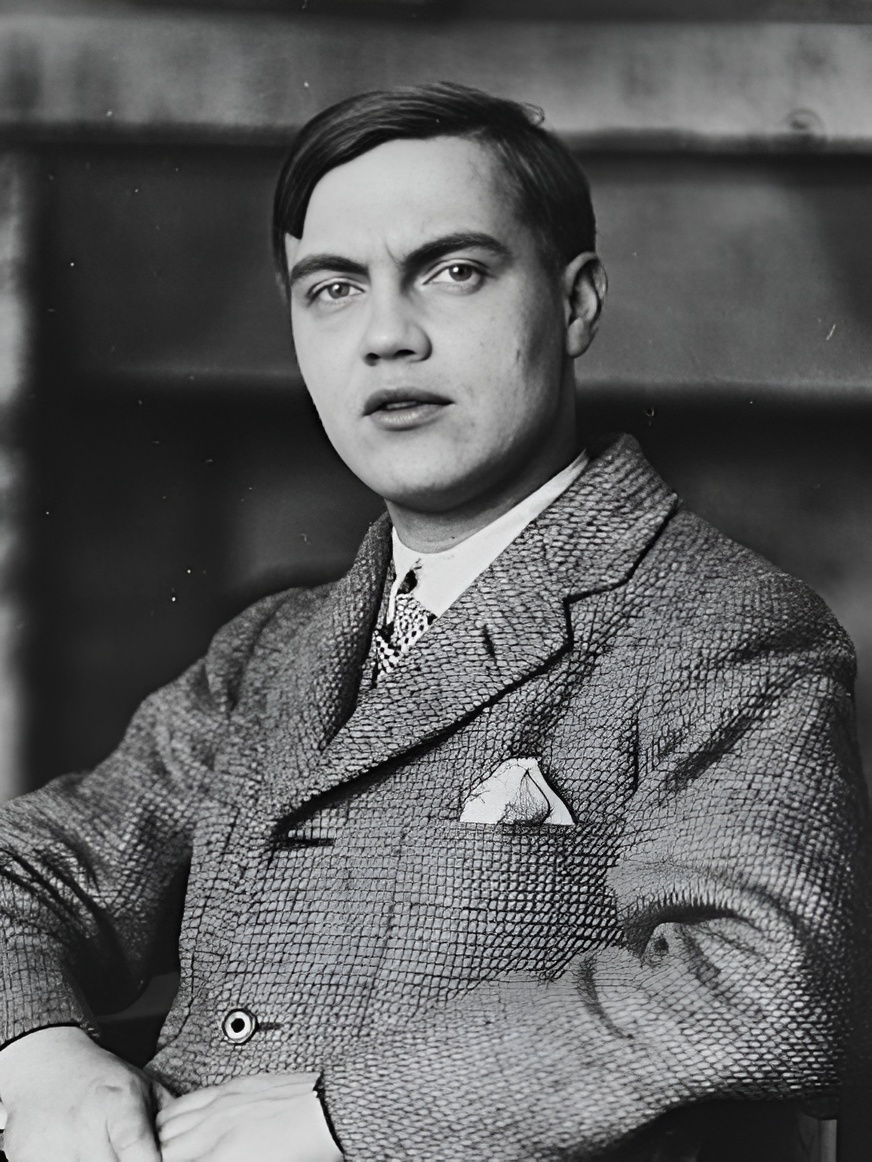
- Detail from a portrait of Antheil, by American photographer Berenice Abbott, c. 1927
- Born: July 8, 1900; Trenton, New Jersey, U.S.
- Died: February 12, 1959 (aged 58); New York, New York, U.S.
- Occupations: Composer; pianist; author; inventor
- Spouse: Boski Markus (m. 1925)
- Children: 1

Signature
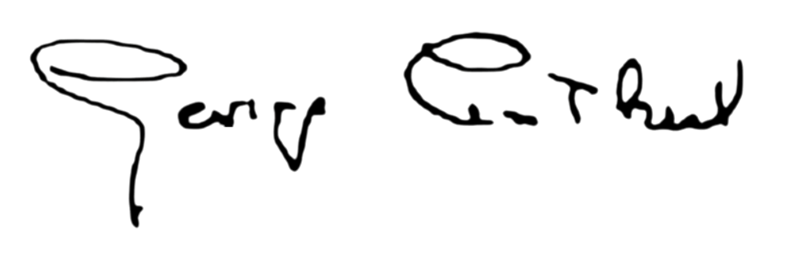

George Johann Carl Antheil (/ˈæntaɪl/ AN-tyle; July 8, 1900 – February 12, 1959) was an American avant-garde composer, pianist, author, and inventor whose modernist musical compositions explored the sounds – musical, industrial, and mechanical – of the early 20th century. Spending much of the 1920s in Europe, Antheil returned to the United States in the 1930s, and thereafter composed music for films, and eventually, television. As a result of this work, his style became more tonal. A man of diverse interests and talents, Antheil was constantly reinventing himself. He wrote magazine articles, an autobiography, a mystery novel, and newspaper and music columns.

In 1941, Antheil and the actress Hedy Lamarr developed a radio guidance system for Allied torpedoes that used a code (stored on a punched paper tape) to synchronize frequency changes, referred to as frequency hopping, between the transmitter and receiver. It is one of the spread spectrum techniques that became widely used in modern telecommunications. This work led to their induction into the National Inventors Hall of Fame in 2014.

== Early life ==
Antheil was born George Johann Carl Antheil, and grew up in a family of German immigrants in Trenton, New Jersey. His father owned a shoe store. Antheil got his education in the Trenton public schools. He was raised bilingually, writing music, prose, and poetry from an early age, and never formally graduated from high school or college, flunking out of Trenton Central High School in 1918. According to Antheil's autobiography, The Bad Boy of Music (1945), he was "so crazy about music", that his mother sent him to the countryside where no pianos were available. Undeterred, George simply arranged for a local music store to deliver a piano. His somewhat unreliable memoir mythologized his origins as a futurist, and emphasized his upbringing near a noisy machine shop and an ominous prison. George's younger brother was Henry W. Antheil Jr.; he became a diplomatic courier and died on June 14, 1940, when his plane was shot down over the Baltic Sea.

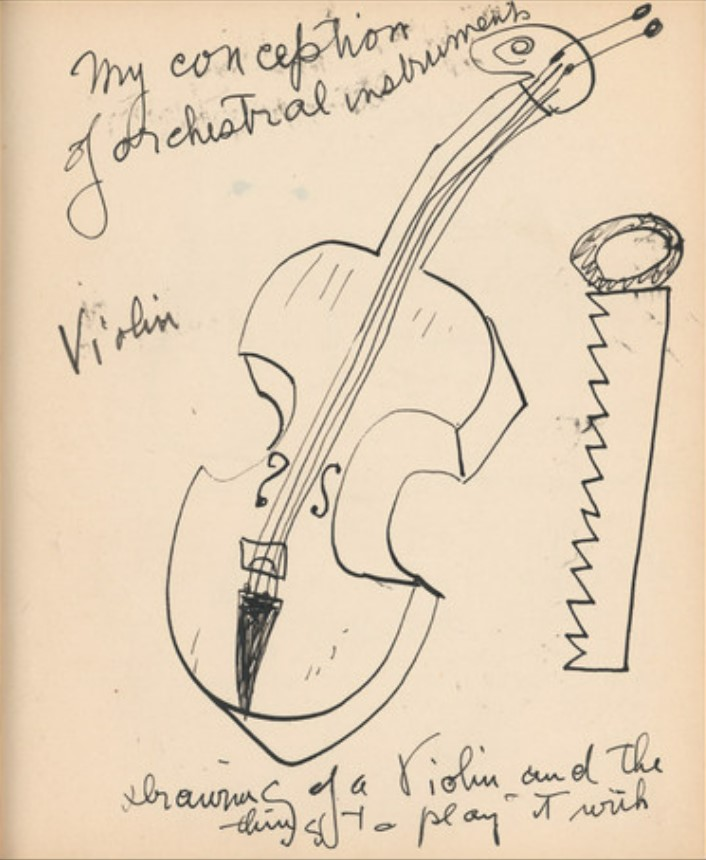
Journal entry by a young Antheil, showing a violin and hand saw, captioned, "Drawing of a violin and the thing to play it with"

Antheil started studying the piano at the age of six. In 1916, he traveled regularly to Philadelphia to study under Constantine von Sternberg, a former pupil of Franz Liszt. From Sternberg, he received formal composition training in the European tradition, but his trips to the city also exposed him to conceptual art, including Dadaism. In 1919, he began to work with the more progressive Ernest Bloch in New York. Initially, Bloch had been skeptical and had rejected him, describing Antheil's compositions as "empty" and "pretentious"; however, the teacher was won over by Antheil's enthusiasm and energy, and helped him financially as he attempted to complete an aborted first symphony. Antheil's trips to New York also permitted him to meet important figures of the modernist movement, including the musician Leo Ornstein, journalist and music critic Paul Rosenfeld, painter John Marin, photographer Alfred Stieglitz, and Margaret Anderson, editor of The Little Review.

At age 19, Antheil was invited to spend the weekend with Anderson and a group of friends; he stayed six months, and the close-knit group, who included Georgette Leblanc, former companion of Maurice Maeterlinck, were to become influential in Antheil's career. Anderson described Antheil as short with an oddly shaped nose, who played "a compelling mechanical music", and used "the piano exclusively as an instrument of percussion, making it sound like a xylophone or a cymballo". Intensely engaged in his music, during this period, Antheil worked on songs, a piano concerto, and a work that came to be known as "The Mechanisms".

Around this time, von Sternberg introduced Antheil to his patron of the next two decades: Mary Louise Curtis Bok, later the founder of the Curtis Institute of Music. Assured by von Sternberg of Antheil's genius and good character, Bok gave him a monthly stipend of $150, and arranged for him to study at the Philadelphia Settlement Music School. Though she came to disapprove of his behavior and his work, for the next 20 years, she continued to respond favorably to his letters. As her financial support enabled Antheil to maintain a degree of independence in his work, many observers believed he should have given her more credit in his autobiography for the length and extent of her contribution to his career.

Antheil continued his piano studies, and the study of modernist compositions, such as those by Igor Stravinsky and members of the Les Six group of French composers. In 1921, he wrote his first in a series of technology-based works, the solo piano Second Sonata, "The Airplane". Other works in the group included the Sonata Sauvage (1922–23) and subsequently Third Sonata, "Death of Machines" (1923), "Mechanisms" (c. 1923), both composed in Europe. He also worked on his first symphony, managing to attract Leopold Stokowski to premiere it. Before the performance could take place, Antheil left for Europe to pursue his career. This may have diminished his chances for success in his native country.

== Berlin and Paris ==
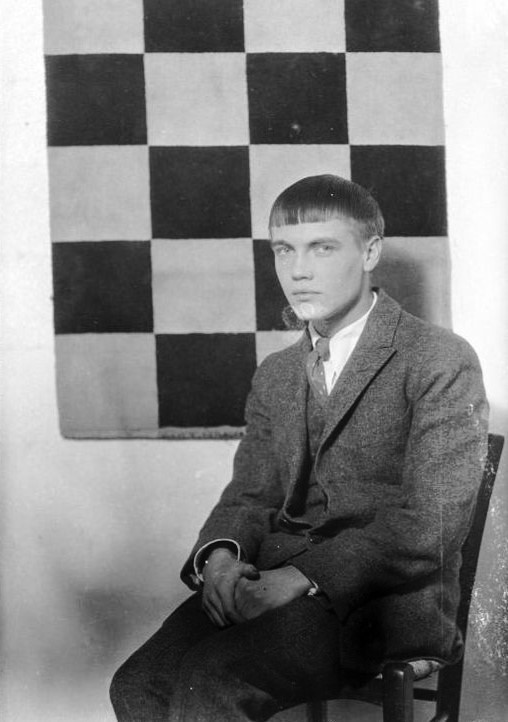
Antheil photographed with his signature bangs, c. 1922

On May 30, 1922, at the age of 21, Antheil sailed for Europe to make his name as "a new ultra-modern pianist composer" and a "futurist terrible". He had engaged Leo Ornstein's manager, and opened his European career with a concert at Wigmore Hall. The concert featured works by Claude Debussy and Stravinsky, as well as his own compositions.

He spent a year in Berlin, planning to work with Artur Schnabel, and gave concerts in Budapest, Vienna, and at the Donaueschingen Festival. As he had desired, he achieved notoriety, but often had to pay the concert expenses out of his own pocket. His financial situation was not helped by Mrs. Bok's reduction of his stipend by half, though she often responded to requests to fund specific aspects of his concerts. He met Boski Markus, a Hungarian and niece of the Austrian playwright Arthur Schnitzler, who became his companion and whom he married in 1925.

In the fall of 1922, Antheil took advantage of a chance meeting to introduce himself to his idol Stravinsky in Berlin. They established a warm intimacy and the more established composer encouraged Antheil to move to Paris. He went as far as arranging a concert to launch Antheil's career in the French capital, but the younger man failed to show up, preferring to travel to Poland with Markus. The Antheils finally arrived in Paris in June 1923, in time to attend the premiere of Stravinsky's ballet Les Noces, but the relationship with Stravinsky did not survive for long. Stravinsky snubbed the younger man, having discovered that Antheil had boasted that "Stravinsky admired his work". The breach devastated Antheil, and was not ultimately repaired until 1941, when Stravinsky sent the family tickets to a concert he was giving in Hollywood.

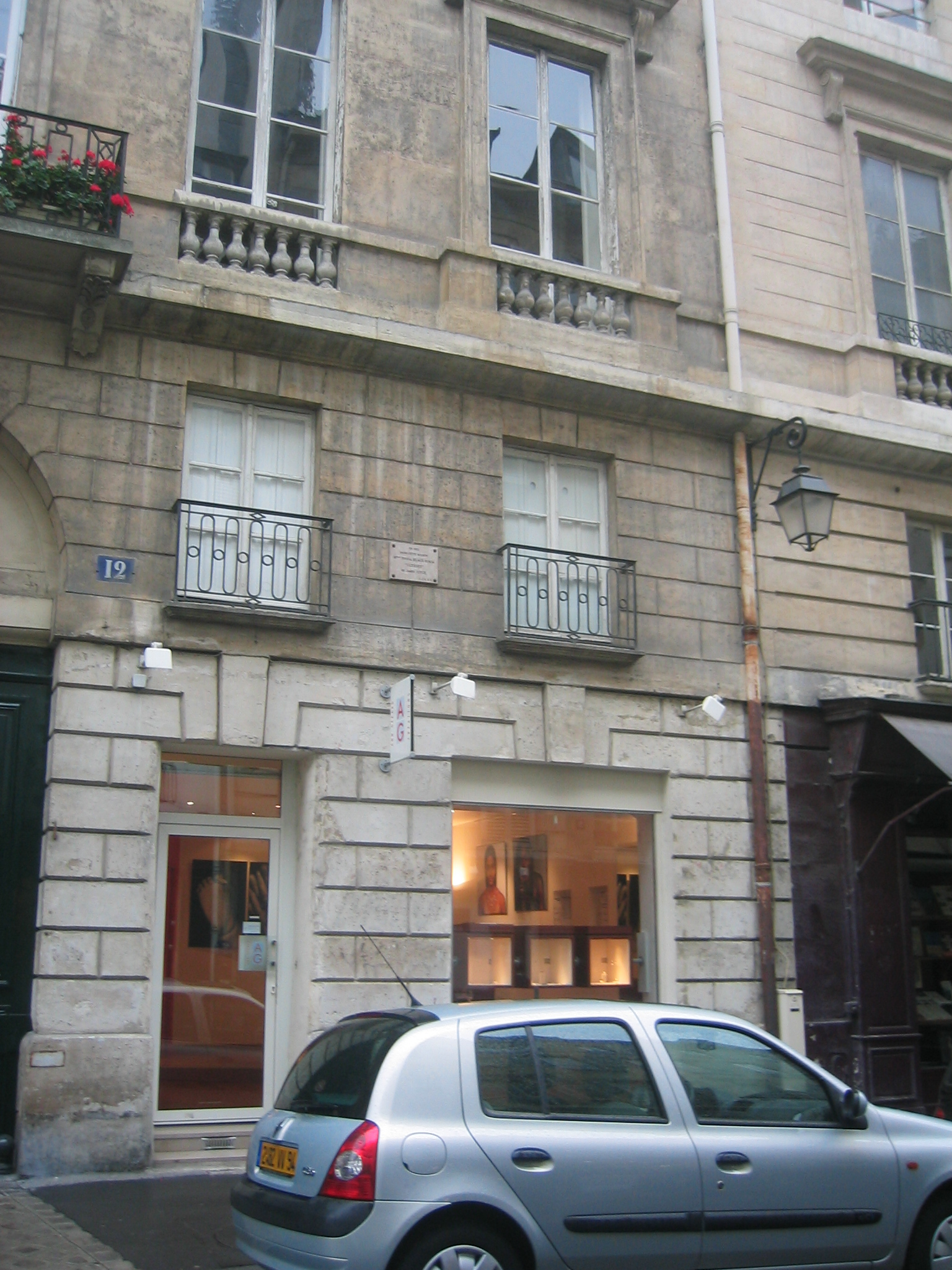
12 Rue de l'Odéon, Antheil's home in Paris, as seen in 2004

Despite the inauspicious beginning, Antheil found Paris, at the time, a center of musical and artistic innovation, to be a "green tender morning" compared to the "black night" of Berlin. Like George Gershwin, Antheil was among the few young American composers in Paris not to study with Nadia Boulanger.

The couple lived in a one bedroom apartment above Sylvia Beach's bookshop Shakespeare and Company. Beach described him "as fellow with bangs, a squished nose and a big mouth with a grin in it. A regular American high school boy." She was very supportive, and introduced Antheil to her circle of friends and customers including Erik Satie, Ezra Pound, James Joyce, Virgil Thomson, and Ernest Hemingway. Joyce and Pound were soon talking of an opera collaboration. Pound, in particular, was to become an extravagant supporter and promoter of Antheil and his work, comparing him variously to Stravinsky and James Cagney, and describing him as breaking down music to its "musical atom". Pound introduced Antheil to Jean Cocteau, who in turn helped launch Antheil into the musical salons of Paris; Pound also commissioned Antheil to write three violin sonatas for his mistress, Olga Rudge. In 1924, Pound published Antheil and the Treatise on Harmony, as part of his campaign to boost Antheil's reputation. The book may have done Antheil more harm than good, and the composer was to distance himself from it in his memoir. Natalie Barney helped produce some original works, including the First String Quartet in 1925.

Antheil was asked to make his Paris debut at the opening of the Ballets suédois, an important Paris social event. He programmed several recent compositions, including the "Airplane Sonata", the "Sonata Sauvage", and "Mechanism". Halfway through his performance, a riot broke out, much to Antheil's delight. According to Antheil, "People were fighting in the aisles, yelling, clapping, hooting! Pandemonium! ... the police entered, and any number of surrealists, society personages, and people of all descriptions were arrested ... Paris hadn't had such a good time since the premiere of Stravinsky's Sacre du Printemps." The riot was filmed and may in fact have been engineered, as the Marcel L'Herbier movie L'Inhumaine needed a riot scene set in a concert hall. In the audience were Erik Satie, Darius Milhaud, Man Ray, Pablo Picasso, Jean Cocteau, and Francis Picabia. Antheil was delighted when Satie and Milhaud praised his music.

Reactions to his first performances were cool at best. His technique was loud, brazen, and percussive. Critics wrote that he hit the piano rather than played it, and indeed he often injured himself by doing so. As part of his "bad boy" behavior, Antheil provocatively pulled a revolver from his jacket and laid it on the piano.

== Ballet Mécanique and later work in Europe ==
Antheil's best-known composition is Ballet Mécanique. The noise music "ballet" was originally conceived to be accompanied by the film of the same name by experimental filmmakers Fernand Léger and Dudley Murphy (with cinematography by Man Ray), although the nature of the collaboration is mysterious. The first productions of Antheil's work in 1925 and 1926 did not include the film, which turned out to last around 19 minutes, only half as long as Antheil's score.

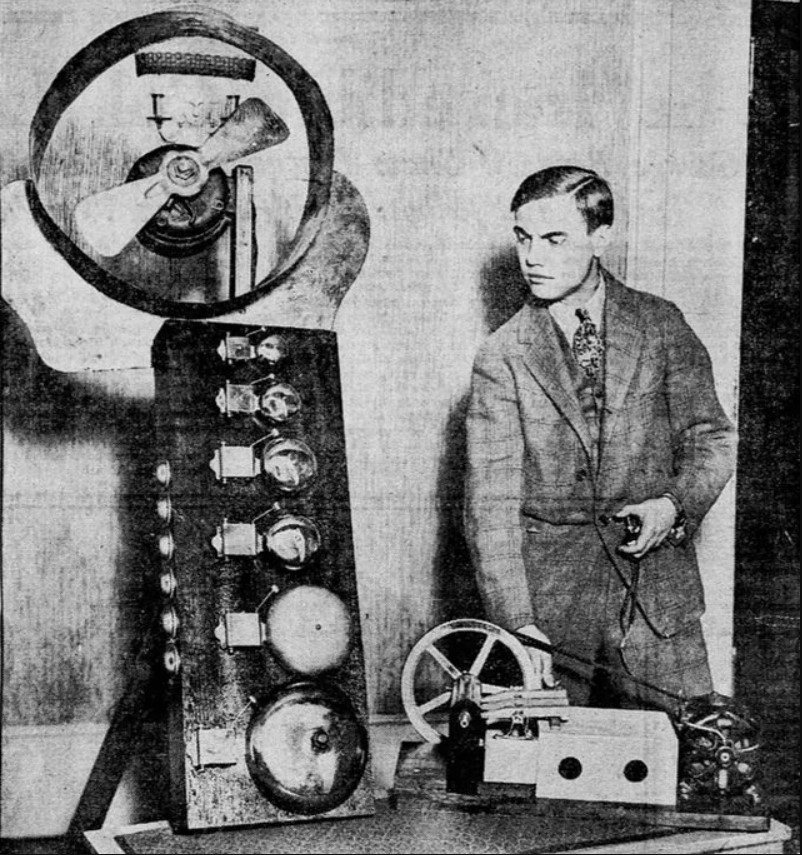
Antheil posing with one of the "noisemakers" he built for Ballet Mécanique, c. early 1920s

Antheil described his "first big work" as "scored for countless numbers of player pianos. All percussive. Like machines. All efficiency. No LOVE. Written without sympathy. Written cold as an army operates. Revolutionary as nothing has been revolutionary." Antheil's original conception was scored for 16 specially synchronized player pianos, two grand pianos, electronic bells, xylophones, bass drums, a siren and three airplane propellers, but difficulties with the synchronization resulted in a rewrite for a single pianola and multiple human pianists. The piece consisted of periods of music and interludes of silence set against the roar of the airplane propellers. Antheil described as "by far my most radical work ... It is the rhythm of machinery, presented as beautifully as an artist knows how." The Léger-Murphy film and Antheil's score were finally performed together at the Museum of Modern Art, New York, in 1935.

Antheil assiduously promoted the work, and even engineered his supposed "disappearance" while on a visit to Africa, so as to get media attention for a preview concert. The Paris première in June 1926 was sponsored by an American patroness who at the end of the concert was (according to Antheil) "tossed in a blanket by three baronesses and a duke." At the official première at the Théâtre des Champs-Élysées, Antheil's music enraged some of the concert-goers, whose objections were drowned out by the cacophonous music, while others vocally supported the work, and the concert ended with a riot in the streets.

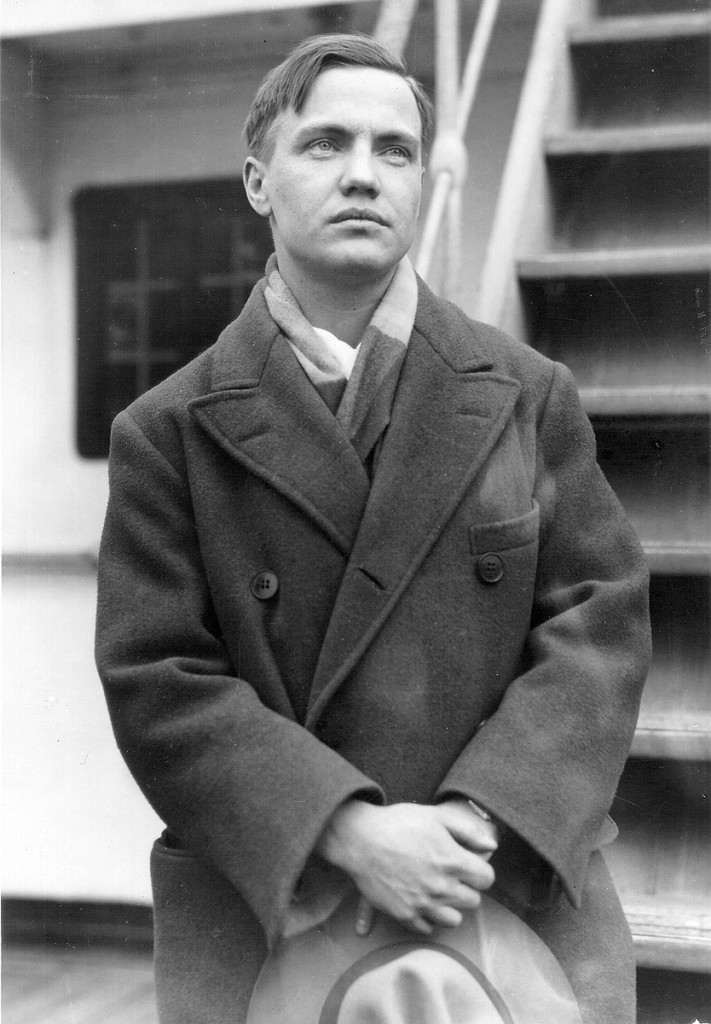
Antheil arriving in New York in 1927

On April 10, 1927, Antheil rented New York's Carnegie Hall to present an entire concert devoted to his works, including the American debut of Ballet Mécanique in a scaled-down version. He commissioned elaborate backdrops of skyscrapers and machines, and engaged an African American orchestra to premiere his A Jazz Symphony. The concert started well, but according to the concert's promoter and producer, when the wind machine was turned on, "all hell, in a minor way, broke loose." During the gale, audience members clutched their programs and their hats, one "tied a handkerchief to his cane and waved it wildly in the air in a sign of surrender." Much to the amusement of the audience, the untested siren failed to sound on cue, despite frantic cranking and reached its climax only after the end of the performance, as the audience was clapping and leaving the hall. American critics were hostile, calling the concert "a bitter disappointment" and dismissing the Ballet Mécanique as "boring, artless, and naive" and Antheil's hoped-for riots failed to materialize. The failure of the Ballet Mécanique affected him deeply, and he never fully recovered his reputation during his lifetime, though his interest in the mechanical was emulated by other prominent composers such as Arthur Honegger, Sergei Prokofiev, and Erik Satie. In 1954, Antheil created a modified version of the work for percussion, four pianos, and a recording of an airplane motor. This second version of the work retains the difficult piano and percussion parts but simplifies many of the rhythmic challenges. It is easier to rehearse and present than the original.

In the late 1920s, Antheil again moved to Germany, where he worked as assistant musical director of the municipal theatre in Berlin, and wrote music for the ballet and theatre. In 1930, he premiered his first opera Transatlantic. This work, which involved American politics, gangsters, a bathtub scene and a Childs Restaurant was a success at the Frankfurt Opera. In 1933, the rise of the Nazi party made Antheil's avant garde music unwelcome in Germany, and in the depths of the Depression, he returned to the US and settled in New York City.

He re-entered American life with enthusiasm, organizing concerts, working on committees with Aaron Copland and Wallingford Riegger, and writing piano, ballet, and film scores, as well as an opera Helen Retires about Helen of Troy; the latter proved a flop. His music had moved away from more extreme aspects of modernism, and more tonal, neoromantic aspects were by now discernible in his work.

== Hollywood ==
In 1936, Antheil travelled to Hollywood, where he became a sought-after film composer, writing more than 30 scores for such directors as Cecil B. DeMille and Nicholas Ray, including The Scoundrel (1935) and The Plainsman (1936). The Antheils' only child, a son named Peter, was born in 1937. Antheil found the industry hostile to modern music, complaining that it was a "closed proposition", and describing most background scores as "unmitigated tripe". He became increasingly dependent on more independent producers such as Ben Hecht to give him work, such as Angels Over Broadway (1940) and Specter of the Rose (1946). He also wrote the score for the independent film Dementia (1955) and In a Lonely Place (1950) starring Humphrey Bogart. Antheil was confident in the ability of his music to save a weak film. "If I say so myself, I've saved a couple of sure flops".

Besides writing scores for movies, he continued to compose other music, including for ballet and six symphonies; his later works were in a more romantic style and influenced by Prokofiev and Shostakovich, as well as American music including jazz. Works such as Serenade No. 1, Piano Sonata No. 4, Songs of Experience and Eight Fragments from Shelley, written in 1948 showed a self-described desire "to disassociate myself from the passé modern schools of the last half-century, and to create a music for myself and those around me which has no fear of developed melody, real development itself, tonality, or other understandable forms." His 1953 opera Volpone was premiered in New York in 1953 to mixed reviews, while a visit to Spain in the 1950s influenced some of his last works, including the film score for The Pride and the Passion (1957). He also accepted a commission from the CBS Television network to compose a theme for their newsreel and documentary film series The Twentieth Century (1957–1966), narrated by Walter Cronkite.

== Other interests ==
Apart from music, Antheil had many other pursuits. In 1930, as Stacey Bishop, he wrote a murder mystery called Death in the Dark with a character based on Ezra Pound. He was the film music reporter and critic for the magazine Modern Music from 1936 to 1940, writing columns considered lively and thoughtful, noting the comings and goings of musicians and composers during an era when the industry was flirting with more "modern" scores for films. He was disappointed, however, and wrote that "Hollywood, after a grand splurge with new composers and new ideas, has settled back into its old grind of producing easy and sure-fire scores."

Before World War II, he participated in the Hollywood Anti-Nazi League, putting on exhibits of artworks banned in Nazi Germany such as those by Käthe Kollwitz. He also published a book of war predictions, entitled The Shape of the War to Come.

In 1945, he published a memoir called Bad Boy of Music, which became a bestseller.

Antheil wrote a nationally syndicated newspaper relationship advice column, as well as regular columns in magazines such as Esquire and Coronet. He considered himself an expert on female endocrinology, and wrote a series of articles about how to determine the availability of women based on glandular effects on their appearance, with titles such as "The Glandbook for the Questing Male". Another book of "glandular criminology" was titled Every Man His Own Detective.

Antheil's interest in this area brought him into contact with the actress Hedy Lamarr, who sought his advice about how she might enhance her upper torso. He suggested glandular extracts, but their conversation then moved to torpedoes.

== Frequency-hopping radio invention ==
During World War II, Lamarr realized that a single radio-controlled torpedo could severely damage or sink enemy ships causing irreparable damage. However these radio-controlled torpedoes could easily be detected and jammed, by broadcasting interference at the frequency of the control signal, thereby causing the torpedo to go off course.

Antheil and Lamarr developed the idea of using frequency hopping: in this case using a player piano roll to randomly change the signal sent between the control center and torpedo at short bursts within a range of 88 frequencies on the spectrum (88 black and white keys are on a piano keyboard). The specific code for the sequence of frequencies would be held identically by the controlling ship and in the torpedo. This basically encrypted the signal, as it was impossible for the enemy to scan and jam all 88 frequencies because this would have required too much power. Antheil would control the frequency-hopping sequence using a player-piano mechanism, which he had earlier used to score his Ballet Mécanique.

On August 11, 1942, U.S. patent 2,292,387 was granted to Antheil and "Hedy Kiesler Markey", Lamarr's married name at the time. This early version of frequency hopping, though novel, soon met with opposition from the U.S. Navy and was not adopted.

The idea was not implemented in the US until 1962, when it was used by U.S. military ships during a blockade of Cuba after the patent had expired. The patent was little known until 1997, when the Electronic Frontier Foundation gave Lamarr a belated award for her contributions. In 1998, an Ottawa wireless technology developer, Wi-LAN, acquired a 49% claim to the long expired patent from Lamarr for an undisclosed amount of stock. Lamarr and Antheil's frequency-hopping scheme shares some concepts with modern spread-spectrum communication technology, such as Bluetooth, COFDM used in Wi-Fi network connections, and CDMA used in some cordless and wireless telephones. Blackwell, Martin, and Vernam's 1920 Secrecy Communication System (U.S. patent 1,598,673) was a predecessor to Kiesler and Antheil's patent, which employed the techniques in the autonomous control of torpedoes.

== Death ==
Antheil was just 58 when he died of a heart attack in 1959 in the New York City borough of Manhattan. His legacy included three accomplished students, Henry Brant, Benjamin Lees, and Ruth White. He is buried in Riverview Cemetery, in Trenton, New Jersey.

== In literature ==
"Antheil's my man." Mrs. McKisco turned challengingly to Rosemary, "Antheil and Joyce. I don't suppose you ever hear much about those sort of people in Hollywood, but my husband wrote the first criticism of Ulysses that ever appeared in America." (F. Scott Fitzgerald, Tender Is the Night)

== Bibliography ==
- Death In the Dark, a crime novel edited and published by T. S. Eliot (1930)
- Every Man His Own Detective: A Study of Glandular Criminology, New York City: Stackpole Sons (1937)
- "The Shape of the War to Come", a pamphlet (1940)
- Bad Boy of Music, Garden City, New York: Doubleday (1945; various reprints and languages)
- Antheil, George (1953). "Glandbook for the questing male". In Birmingham, Frederic A. (ed.). The girls from Esquire. London: Arthur Barker. pp. 287–299.

== See also ==
- List of compositions by George Antheil
