= Helen Retires =

Opera by George Antheil

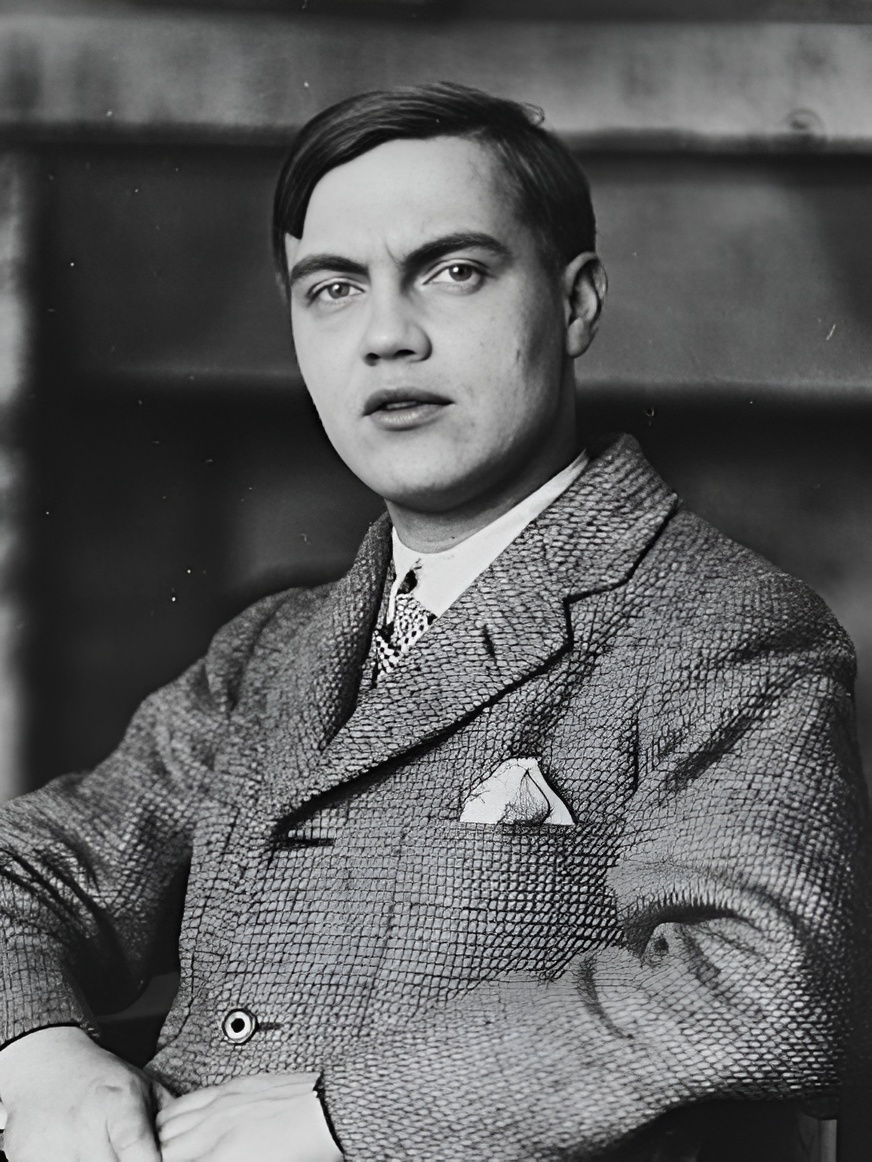
George Antheil in 1927

Helen Retires is the second opera by George Antheil. The libretto was written by John Erskine based on his novel The Private Life of Helen of Troy (1925). It was written in 1931 but not performed until 1934 when it was produced by the Juilliard School (where Erskine was president).

== Synopsis ==
The opera is a telling of the story of Helen of Troy after her husband's (Menelaos) death. It opens with his funeral banquet. Helen descends to the nether world to seek Achilles on the Island of the Blest.

Finding Achilles the two return from Hades and proceed to sing love duets until an old fisherman convinces Helen that no love can last forever. She then sends Achilles back to Hades and stretches out to die. But along comes a young fisherman who dances and convinces Helen to try at love again.
