= List of Encyclopædia Britannica Films titles =

Encyclopædia Britannica Films was an educational film production company in the 20th century owned by Encyclopædia Britannica Inc.

See also Encyclopædia Britannica Films and the animated 1990 television series Britannica's Tales Around the World.

== A ==
Title	Major credits	B&W or color	Running time	Year/copyright date	Notes
Abraham Lincoln	(Emerson Film Corp.); J. G. Randall	B&W	18m	August 10, 1951	Famous Men and Women of the World
Abraham Lincoln	Scott Craig; Kathy Tallon	color	23m	1982	Great Americans
Acid (History of LSD)	Art Ciocco (producer)	color	26m	April 23, 1971	video
Acting For The Film: Wilder's The Long Christmas Dinner	Larry Yust	color	14m	March 16, 1976	Short Play Showcase
Adaptive Radiation: The Mollusks	John Walker (producer)	color	11m	December 6, 1961	Biology program, unit 3: Animal life; video
Adolescent Responsibilities: Craig and Mark	Rose M. Somerville	color	28m	August 15, 1973	
Adoration of the Magi	(Visual Images); David W. Powell, Cherill Anson & Richard McLanathan	color	7m	1973	
Adventure in Venice	John Barnes	color	25m	April 19, 1974 (completed '72)	video
Adventures of a Baby Fox	(Aktiebolaget Svenski Filmindustri); Arne Sucksdorff	B&W	15m	June 27, 1955	Original film edited from En Sommarsaga (1941)
Adventures of a Chipmunk Family	Helen D. MacCracken	color	10m	June 25, 1959	
Adventures of a Young Eagle	(Hungarofilm); Dr. Istvan Homoki-Nagy	color	17m	1968	
(The) Adventures of Bunny Rabbit	(ERPI); Arthur I. Gates & Celeste C. Peardon; L. K. Eads (advisor); camera: Lynwood Chace	B&W	10m	May 1, 1937	video
The Adventures of Bunny Rabbit	Wolfgang Bayer	color	11m	1983	
Aerodynamic Generation of Sound	Charles R. Conn & Bruce A. Egan (producer); John Friedman; editor: William Tannebring	B&W	40m	1969	
Afghanistan: Threads of Life	Irwin Dermer	color	29m	1980	video
Africa: Central and Eastern Regions	Jeffrey Osier	color	17m	1993	Geography of Africa
Africa: Historical Heritage	(Concept Films); Benjamin Quarles & Sterling Stuckey	color	9m	January 5, 1972	video
Africa: Living in Two Worlds	(Visual Education Centre)	color	14m	February 5, 1971	
Africa: Northern Region	Jeffrey Osier	color	17m	1993	Geography of Africa
Africa: Southern Region	Jeffrey Osier	color	17m	1993	Geography of Africa
Africa: Western Region	Jeffrey Osier	color	17m	1993	Geography of Africa
The Age of Exploration: How Did It Change the World?		color	16m	1991	
The Aggressive Impulse	(Avatar Learning)	color	19m	December 30, 1977	
The Aging of Lakes	(Concept Films); John Walker & Bert Van Bork	color	14m	February 19, 1971	video
Air and What It Does		color	11m	September 24, 1962	video
Air Around Us	Donald G. Hoffman (producer); Bryan F. Swan	B&W	11m	June 30, 1954	video
The Airplane Changes Our World Map	(ERPI); George T. Renner	B&W	10m	October 10, 1942	video
Airplane Trip	Greg Heimer (producer); Janice Laine	color	15m	December 21, 1972	
An Airplane Trip	(ERPI); Ernest Horn	B&W	10m	September 30, 1938	video
An Airplane Trip (2nd edition)		B&W	11m	January 24, 1955	
An Airplane Trip by Jet	Milan Herzog (producer); Paul Robert Hanna	color	11m	December 20, 1961	video
An Airplane Trip to Mexico	(New Horizon Films)	color	11m	May 28, 1952	
Airplanes: How They Fly	Bert Van Bork & Milton O. Pella	color	11m	January 5, 1959	
The Airport	Paul Robert Hanna	B&W	11m	November 24, 1948	video
Airport in the Jet Age	Larry Yust & Robert B. Churchill; camera: Isidore Mankofsky	color	11m	July 27, 1962	video
Alaska, Reservoir of Resources	(ERPI); Viljjalmur Stefansson	B&W	11m	December 30, 1941	revised 1946; video
Alaska, Settling a New Frontier	National Geographic Society	color	22m	January 27, 1967	video
Alaska the 49th State	David Jay (producer); Bear McKay	color	24m	1985	
Alaska the 49th State - Its People	Ivaar Skarland	color	16m	March 24, 1960	
Alcohol and the Human Body	Warren P. Everote & Anton J. Carlson	B&W	11m	June 13, 1949	video
The Alcohol Problem: What Do You Think?	Stanley Croner & Milan Herzog (producers); Martin P. Schulman	color	18m	May 10, 1973	video
Alcoholism	Selden D. Bacon & Raymond G. McCarthy	B&W	21m	February 19, 1952	video
Alexander Hamilton		B&W	18m	January 2, 1951	Famous Men & Women of the World; video
The Alimentary Tract	(ERPI); A. J. Carlson	B&W	10m	December 2, 1938	video
All the Wonderful Things That Fly	Frank Maniglia	color	14m	1970	
Allergies	Warren P. Everote (producer); Abraham Colmes	color	12m	October 23, 1952	video
The Amazon: People and Resources of Northern Brazil	Milan Herzog (producer); Preston E. James	color	21m	July 2, 1957	video
The American Flag: The Story of Old Glory	Bruce Catton	B&W	14m	May 18, 1956	
The American Flag: The Story of Old Glory (revised)	Bruce Catton	color	14m	December 11, 1959	revised again 1969; video
American Foreign Policy: Eisenhower and The Cold War		color	17m	1981	video
The American Indian Speaks	Thomas G. Smith (producer); Stan Stiener	color	23m	July 27, 1973	video
American Indians of Today	Ruth M. Underhill	color	16m	May 2, 1957	video (black & white print)
The American Revolution	John Barnes; writer: Gilbert Aberg; camera: Louis Clyde Stoumen	color	15m	April 22, 1953	video
The Amish: A People of Preservation	(Heritage Productions); John L. Ruth; collaborator: John A. Hostetler	color	28m	May 31, 1975	video
Amphibian Embryo: Frog, Toad, and Salamander	K. T. Rogers & Ralph Buchsbaum	color	16m	September 30, 1963	Biology program, unit 3: Animal life; video
Analysis of Behavior	(Open University); Nick Watson; camera: Tim Chard; editor: Cath Guiver	color	40m	1993	
Ancient Aztec Indians of North America	Stephen de Borhegyi; script: William Peltz	color	8m	April 7, 1972	
Ancient Baalbek and Palmyra	F. W. Von Keller & E. S. Von Keller; camera: Jack Cardiff	color	10m	September 29, 1953	re-edit of a 1938 "World Windows" short Ruins of Palmyra and Baalbek
Ancient Inca Indians of North America	Stephen de Borhegyi; script: William Peltz	color	8m	April 7, 1972	
Ancient Maya Indians of North America	Stephen de Borhegyi; script: William Peltz	color	8m	May 4, 1972	
Ancient Moderns: Greek Island Art and Culture	Harvey Bellin & Tom Kieffer	color	19m	1979	video
Ancient Petra	F. W. Von Keller & E. S. Von Keller; camera: Jack Cardiff	color	10m	September 2, 1953	re-edit of a 1938 "World Windows" short Petra the Lost City; video
Andrew Carnegie	Harold F. Williamson	B&W	18m	August 10, 1951	Famous Men & Women of the World; video
Andrew Jackson	Arthur M. Schlesinger Jr.	B&W	18m	January 2, 1951	Famous Men & Women of the World; video
Andrew Jackson	(COMWORLD); Arthur Pembleton; writers: Chris Gallagher & David Hamilton	color	13m	1982	Great Americans
Angiosperms the Flowering Plants	John Walker (producer); Ralph Buchsbaum & Howard J. Arnott	color	20m	June 18, 1962	Biology program, unit 2: Plant life; video
Animal Babies	Barbara Wehr	color	10m	1983	
Animal Breeding	Warren P. Everote	B&W	13m	June 23, 1954 (completed '53)	
Animal Homes	Warren P. Everote and William James Hamilton; camera: Lynwood M. Chace	B&W	11m	January 6, 1955	video
Animal Populations: Nature's Checks and Balances	Jerry Haislmaier	color	22m	1983	
Animal Town of the Prairie: Prairie Dogs and Their Neighbors	Charles C Carpenter	color	10m	June 2, 1959	
Animal Tracks and Signs		color	11m	October 11, 1961	
Animals at Night	William Kay (producer); camera: Warren Garst; advisor: Margaret McKibben Lawler	color	11m	September 12, 1961	Basic life science, unit 2: The world of animals
Animals at Work in Nature	Nicholas Dancy (producer); Warren P. Everote; William James Hamilton Jr.; camera: Lynwood Chase	color	10m	June 14, 1956	
Animals Growing Up	Wilbur L. Beauchamp	B&W	11m	May 31, 1949	video
Animals in Autumn	William V. Mayer	color	11m	August 9, 1957	video
Animals in Autumn and Winter	Wolfgang Bayer	color	11m	1983	video
Animals in Modern Life	(ERPI); (George) Clyde Fisher	B&W	11m	October 15, 1937	video
Animals in Spring	Warren P. Everote; camera: Lynwood M. Chace	color	11m	November 19, 1954	video
Animals in Summer	Warren P. Everote; camera: Lynwood M. Chace	color	10m	December 9, 1954	video
Animals in the City	Paul Witty (producer)	color	10m	April 24, 1978	
Animals in Winter	Warren P. Everote; camera: Lynwood M. Chace; assist: Ann H. Morgan	B&W	11m	October 30, 1950	video
Animals of the Indian Jungle	F. W. Von Keller & E. S. Von Keller (producers); Charles McCann & Jack Cardiff	color	11m	May 14, 1957	re-edit of a 1939 "World Windows" short Jungle; video
Animals of the Zoo	(ERPI)	B&W	10m	April 3, 1933	
Animals Useful to Man	John Walker (producer)	B&W	11m	November 1, 1960	
Animals - Ways They Eat (What Do They Eat?)		color	11m	May 31, 1956	revised 1971; video
Animals - Ways They Move (How Do They Move?)		color	11m	May 31, 1956	revised 1971
Answering the Child's Why (Personality Development Series)	Milan Herzog (producer); Lawrence K. Frank	color	14m	March 15, 1951	video
Antarctica: Exploring the Frozen Continent	(Avatar Learning); narrator: Steven Marshall	color	23m	1979	
Antibiotics	Milan Herzog (producer); Marvin J Johnson	B&W	14m	November 18, 1952	video
Ants	William A. Anderson (producer); Warren P. Everote & Arthur C. Cole; camera: Lynwood M. Chace	B&W	11m	December 31, 1948	
Anyone at All! Safety in the Community	John Barnes (producer)	B&W	22m	September 13, 1954	video
Aphids: Plant Lice	(ERPI)	B&W	10m	April 3, 1933	
The Apple Tree	John Walker (producer); George I. Schwartz	color	11m	July 4, 1966	Basic life science, a plant through the seasons
Apples - from Seedling to Market	(Viking Pictures)	color	11m	November 30, 1950	video
Arabian Bazaar	F. W. Von Keller & E. S. Von Keller; camera: Jack Cardiff	color	11m	August 19, 1953	re-edit of a 1938 "World Windows" short of the same title
Arabian Children	Donald G. Hoffman (producer); Clarence W. Sorensen	B&W	15m	June 21, 1954	Children of Many Lands; video
The Aral Sea: Environment under Siege	(Institut for Film und Bild in Wissenschaft und Unterricht); HansjuÌrgen Hilgert; narrator: Norman Pellegrini	color	16m	1994	
Archeological Dating: Retracing Time	Bert Van Bork	color	18m	December 12, 1975	
Archimedes' Principle	Warren P. Everote (producer); Milan Herzog & O. W. Eshbach	B&W	6m	September 10, 1953	
Are Manners Important?	Hal Kopel (producer); Rose H. Alschuler; narrator: James Brill	B&W	11m	June 4, 1954	video
Argentina: People of Buenos Aires	(ERPI); Earle K. James	B&W	10m	December 10, 1940	video
Argentina: People of the Pampa	John T. Bobbitt (producer)	color	11m	May 2, 1957	
Aristotle's Ethics, Book I: The Theory of Happiness	John Barnes; writer: Mortimer Jerome Adler; art director: C. Walter Hodges; camera: Michael Livesey	color	11m	March 6, 1963	video
Army Ants, A Study in Social Behavior	John Walker (producer); Ralph Buchsbaum	color	19m	December 6, 1966	Biology program, unit 3: Animal life; video
Art and Motion	Paul Burnford (producer); Virginia Purcell	color	12m	October 28, 1952	
Art in the Western World (National Gallery of Art)	Milan Herzog (producer); John Walker and Bert Van Bork	color	30m	April 18, 1958	video of black and white version
The Art of Huckleberry Finn	Larry Yust; camera: Isidore Mankofsky; narrator: Clifton Fadiman	color	25m	December 16, 1965	
Art of the Middle Ages: Medieval France	John Barnes; writer: John Canaday; art director: C. Walter Hodges; camera: Archer Goodwin; editor: Robert Johnson	color	30m	April 10, 1963	video
Art: What Is It? Why Is It?	John Barnes; writer: John Canaday; art director: C. Walter Hodges; camera: Archer Goodwin & Bert Van Bork; editor: Robert Johnson	color	30m	March 19, 1963	
Arteries of Life	(New York Zoological Society); George Brewer (producer); John H. Storer	color	11m	July 6, 1948	The Living Forest; video
Arteries of the City (Arteries of New York City)	(ERPI); Robert S. Lynd	B&W	11m	August 5, 1941	revised with added scenes in 1951; video
Artimus and Old Laces: Long Multiplication	(Davidson Films); Elizabeth Janeway	color	12m	February 12, 1976	Math That Counts
The Artist at Work, Jacques Lipchitz: Master Sculptor	James D. Breckenridge & Bert Van Bork	color	12m	May 21, 1968	
Arts and Crafts of Mexico	M. D. C. Crawford	B&W	10m	January 3, 1939	
Arts and Crafts of Mexico Part 1	William Deneen	color	14m	May 10, 1961	
Arts and Crafts of Mexico Part 2	William Deneen	color	12m	September 5, 1961	video
Arturo B. Fallico: Clay in Action	John Ott	B&W	10m	December 1949	
Athens: The Golden Age	John Barnes; writer: Charles Kahn; art director: C. Walter Hodges; camera: Michael Livesey; editor: Robert Johnson	color	30m	January 21, 1963	video
Atlantic Crossing, Life on an Ocean Liner	William Deneen & Elizabeth Graf	color	21m	July 20, 1967	video
The Atmosphere and Its Circulation		B&W	11m	December 30, 1944	video
Atmosphere of Motion	William Kay (producer); Roscoe Braham	color	20m	December 28, 1973	
Atmosphere Pressure: The Magdeburg Experiment	Robert Longini (producer); Harvey B. Lemon	B&W	11m	October 28, 1955	video
The Atom and Agriculture	Warren P. Everote (producer); B. Connor Johnson	B&W	11m	July 22, 1953 (completed '52)	University of Chicago, Division of Sciences Series
The Atom and Biological Science	Warren P. Everote (producer)	B&W	14m	September 10, 1953 (completed '52)	University of Chicago, Division of Sciences Series; video
The Atom and Industry	Warren P. Everote (producer)	B&W	11m	November 18, 1952	University of Chicago, Division of Sciences Series; video
The Atom and Medicine	Warren P. Everote (producer)	B&W	11m	November 18, 1952	University of Chicago, Division of Sciences Series
Atom Smashers	Warren P. Everote (producer)	color	11m	May 27, 1953	University of Chicago, Division of Sciences Series; video
Atomic Alert	Warren P. Everote	color	15m	March 15, 1951	video
Atomic Energy	William F. Libby	B&W	11m	February 17, 1947	video
Atomic Energy: Inside the Atom	Larry Yust (producer); Stanley Croner & Albert V. Baez; camera: Isidore Mankofsky; narrator: Paul Wilkus	color	15m	August 15, 1961	
Atomic Energy: Inside the Atom (revised)	David Jay (producer)	color	20m	1982	video
Atomic Physics (Mechanics Series)		B&W	series of shorts (30m each)	1957	episode titles: Accelerated Motion : Laboratory / Anatomical Mechanics / Atomic Theory of Matter / Balanced and Unbalanced Forces / Ballistics : Laboratory / Center of Gravity : Laboratory / Center of Mass and Center of Gravity / Centripetal Force : Laboratory / Circular Motion / Coefficient of Friction / Composition of Velocities / Concurrent Forces : Laboratory / Conservation of Angular Momentum / Dynamics of Rotation / Energy and Momentum / Energy and Power / Equilibrium of Rigid Bodies / Falling Bodies : Laboratory / The Force Equation : Laboratory / Friction / Levers / Levers: Laboratory / Machines / Moment of Inertia : Laboratory / Newton's First Law of Motion / Newton's Law of Gravitation and Third Law of Motion / Newton's Second Law of Motion / Parallel Forces : Laboratory / Projectiles / Projectiles : Laboratory / Resolution of Forces / Resolution of Velocities / Rotational Equilibrium / The Simple Crane Laboratory / Speed and Velocity : Laboratory / Streamlining / Work and Energy
Atomic Radiation	Warren P. Everote (producer)	B&W	13m	May 27, 1953	video
Atomic Theory and Chemistry	David Jay (producer); Albert V. Crewe & Robert Deem	color	20m	1985	
Aunt Arie	Steve Heiser and Eliot Wigginton	color	18m	April 24, 1975	
Australia	Edmund de S. Brunner	B&W	11m	December 31, 1948	video
Australia: The Land and the People	William Deneen & Charles M. Davis	color	22m	June 4, 1959	
Autumn on the Farm	E. Laurence Palmer	color	11m	March 25, 1948	video
An Autumn Story: Mrs. Pennypacker's Package	Maclovia Rodriguez; collaborator: Charles Calitri	color	11m	August 14, 1967	

== B ==
Title	Major credits	B&W or color	Running time	Year/copyright date	Notes
Baboon	Jane & Peter Chermayeff	color	10m	1984	Silent Safari
The Baby's Bath	Arnold Gesell	B&W	11m	February 25, 1947	Yale University of Child Development
A Baby's Day at Forty-eight Weeks (Behavioral Day at 48 Weeks)	(ERPI); Arnold Gesell	B&W	11m	February 4, 1935	Yale University of Child Development
A Baby's Day at Twelve Weeks	(ERPI); Arnold Gesell	B&W	31m	February 4, 1935	Yale University of Child Development; video
A Backward Civilization	(ERPI); Ellsworth T. Huntington	B&W	10m	October 15, 1937	video
Bacteria		color	20m	1980	video
Bacteria (Gram Stain: Bacteria)	Bert Van Bork (producer); Ralph Buchsbaum, R. A. Slepecky and Fred Strauss	color	19m	June 21, 1962	
Bacteria, Friend and Foe	Warren P. Everote (producer); Stewart A. Koser	color	11m	March 9, 1954	video
Bacteriology Series		color	series of 8mm film loops (4m each)	1969	titles: Where Bacteria Are Found / Common Bacteria Types / Using the Microscope Pt 1: Parts and Functions / Spontaneous Generation Part II: Effect of Microorganisms in the Air
Balanced Aquarium	Milan Herzog (producer); Walter H. Chute	B&W	11m	February 16, 1955	video
Bali Today	(Condé Nast Productions); Clarence W. Sorensen	color	10m	June 13, 1951	
Ballad of the West	Milan Herzog (producer); Frank Cellier & Merle Travis	B&W	20m	March 15, 1950	
Ball-Handling in Basketball	Wilbur Johns	B&W	11m	May 31, 1946	video
Ball-Handling in Football	Andrew Kerr	B&W	11m	May 31, 1946	
The Baltimore Plan	John Barnes; writer: Selma Weisenborn; camera: Louis Clyde Stoumen	B&W	21m	April 13, 1953 (completed '52)	video
Banana Fever - Short Division	(Davidson Films); Elizabeth Janeway	color	12m	February 20, 1976	Math That Counts
Bartleby	Larry Yust and Clifton Fadiman; camera: Isidore Mankofsky; cast: Patrick Campbell and James Westerfield	color	28m	October 13, 1969	Short Story Showcase; second part: A Discussion of...; video
Barua a Soltani (The King's Letter)	John Barnes (producer); John Walker; narrator: Isak Dinesen	B&W	26m	May 29, 1959	
Basic Atomic Structure Series	(Eothen Films); Boreham Wood	color	series of 8mm film loops	1969	titles: Conductors and Insulators / Introducing Atoms / Electron Shells / Semi-conductors
Basic Elements of Production: Natural Resources, Labor, Capital, Management		B&W	13m	November 29, 1954	
The Battle of Yorktown	Bert Van Bork and Allan Nevins	color	14m	February 3, 1958	video
Baxter: Case Study No. 1 Partners in Quality	(National Educational Media); Mike Wright (producer); camera: Hal Bernstein & Bill Jennings; cast: Ed Grennan	color	25m	1990	
Beach and Sea Animals	(ERPI); (George) Clyde Fisher	B&W	10m	August 1, 1931	
Beach and Sea Animals (2nd edition)	Warren P. Everote (producer); Hilary B. Moore; camera: William A. Anderson	color	11m	December 19, 1957	
The Beach: A River of Sand	(American Geological Institute); Stanley Croner (producer); Warren Brown, John S. Shelton & D. Inman; camera: Isidore Mankofsky & Buddy Botham	color	20m	January 13, 1966	video
The Bear and the Hunter	(Aktiebolaget Svenski Filmindustri); Arne Sucksdorff	B&W	11m	January 12, 1956	Original film edited from Skuggor över Snön (1945); video
Bears: Kings of the Wild	(Avatar Learning); Alan P. Sloan (producer); Charles Sutton and Donald R. Patten	color	23m	1980	
The Beaver	John Haeseler	color	11m	December 29, 1950	video
Beetles	(ERPI); (George) Clyde Fisher	B&W	10m	October 1, 1931	
Beginning to Date	Milan Herzog (producer); Esther Lloyd-Jones	B&W	12m	November 18, 1953	video
The Beginnings of Exploration	(Crawley Films)	color	14m	December 16, 1965	video
Beginnings of Vertebrate Life	Margaret McKibben Lawler (advisor)	color	11m	June 6, 1963	Introduction to Biology
The Behavior of Matter	David Jay (producer); Bear McKay	color	15m	1982	
Behavior Patterns at One Year	(ERPI); Arnold Gesell	B&W	11m	February 4, 1935	Yale University of Child Development
Belonging to the Group	Robert J. Havighurst	B&W	16m	December 31, 1953	video
Benediction	(ERPI)	B&W	30m approx.	March 20, 1931	
Benjamin Banneker, Man of Science	Benjamin Quarles and Sterling Stuckey	color	9m	December 21, 1971	
Benjamin Franklin	(Emerson Film Corp.); Carl Van Doren	B&W	17m	September 27, 1949	Famous Men & Women of the World; video
Benjamin Franklin (2nd edition)	(Osmond Commercial Productions - Kevin Kelly & Ron A. McCrob	color	29m	1980	Great Americans
Berlin: Test for the West		color	19m	August 29, 1962	video
Better Reading	Paul Witty	B&W	13m	August 11, 1952	video
Bible As Literature Part 1: Saga and Story of the Old Testament	John Barnes and Fred Denbeaux; co-camera: Isidore Mankofsky and Alfred Hicks; cast: Michael Higgins, Bernard Hughes and Earle Hyman	color	27m	March 21, 1974	video
Bible As Literature Part 2: History, Poetry and Drama of the Old Testament	John Barnes and Fred Denbeaux; co-camera: Isidore Mankofsky and Alfred Hicks; cast: William Squire, John Rae, Gordon Jackson and Patrick Mower	color	24m	March 21, 1974	video
Big Animals of Africa	James P. Chapin	color	11m	March 27, 1957	video
The Big Cats: Endangered Predators	(Avatar Learning); collaborator: Donald R. Patten	color	23m	1979	
Big Land Animals of North America	Milan Herzog (producer); William James Hamilton	color	11m	June 14, 1956	video
Bike Safety- Making the Right Moves	Thomas G. Smith	color	15m	January 9, 1976	
The Bill of Rights of the United States	John T. Bobbitt (producer); Alpheus T. Mason	B&W	19m	February 28, 1956	video
Biography of the Unborn	Milan Herzog (producer); M. Edward Davis & Edith L. Potter	B&W	16m	May 2, 1956	revised 1965; video
Biological Rhythms: Studies in Chronobiology	Bert Van Bork (producer)	color	22m	November 2, 1977	video
Biological Technique	Ralph Buchsbaum	color	series of 8mm film loops (3m each)	1969	titles: Chromatography Using a Pie Plate / Planaria: Cutting for Regeneration Experiments / Neurospora Techniques
Biology Series	Lynn H. Throckmorton & Ralph Buchsbaum	color	series of 8mm film loops (4m each)	July 6, 1964	titles: Blood Smear Preparation / Crossing Drosophila / Drosophila Medium Preparation / Handling Drosophila
Biology, Form & Function: Is Seeing Believing?	(Open University); presenters: Norman Cohen, Julie Berry, and Don Northcote	color	24m	1990	
Biology, Form & Function: Organelles and Origins	(Open University); Rissa de la Paz (producer); consultant: Norman Cohen; presenters: Julie Berry and John Ellis	color	24m	1990	
Biology: Exploring the Living World	Bert Van Bork and William V. Mayer	color	19m	1979	
Bionics: Man or Machine?	(Avatar Learning); Alan P. Sloan (producer); Barry Clark; music: Richard LaSalle	color	24m	April 28, 1978	
Bip As a Skater	(Crocos Productions); John Barnes; camera: Adam Gifford; cast: Marcel Marceau	color	8m	April 24, 1975	Art of Silence; video
Bip As a Soldier	(Crocos Productions); John Barnes; camera: Adam Gifford; cast: Marcel Marceau	color	8m	April 28, 1975	Art of Silence; video
Bip at a Society Party	(Crocos Productions); John Barnes; camera: Adam Gifford; cast: Marcel Marceau	color	8m	April 26, 1975	Art of Silence; video
Bip Hunts Butterflies	(Crocos Productions); John Barnes; camera: Adam Gifford; cast: Marcel Marceau	color	8m	March 31, 1975	Art of Silence; video
Bird Homes	Austin L. Rand and John Walker	B&W	11m	January 2, 1957	
Bird of Prey: The Red Tailed Hawk	Ed Harris (producer); Robert G. Hinckly	color	14m	1972	
The Bird Who Is a Clown (Blue-footed Booby)	John Walker (producer); Robert Bowman	color	9m	April 1972	video
Birds Are Interesting	Paul Burnford	color	11m	September 20, 1950	
Birds in Winter	Hal Kopel (producer); Emmet Blake	color	11m	December 31, 1958	
Birds of Prey	(ERPI); T. Gilbert Pearon	B&W	10m	September 30, 1938	video
Birth of the Soil	(New York Zoological Society); George Brewer (producer); John H. Storer	color	11m	July 6, 1948	The Living Forest; video
Bishop Turner: Black Nationalist	(Steve Krantz Films); Martin Hollander (producer)	color	9m	November 25, 1970 (completed 1968)	
Black Bear Twins	(ERPI); Ernest Horn	B&W	12m	October 4, 1939	revised 1952 by John Walker; video
Black People in the Slave South	Benjamin Quarles & Sterling Stuckey	color	10m	December 23, 1971	
The Blacksmith	(Silver Dollar Inc.); Claude Locke	color	10m	1978	
Blocking in Football	Andrew Kerr	B&W	11m	May 31, 1946	
Blood Sugar and Diabetes	Rissa de la Paz (producer); narrator: Gina Landor	color	25m	1990	
The Blood	John Walker (producer); George E. Wakerlin	color	16m	August 15, 1961	video
Blood, the Microscopic Miracle	Bruce Hoffman (producer)	color	22m	1982	
Blood: The River of Life	Bruce Hoffman	color	22m	1983	
Blue Dashiki: Jeffrey and His City Neighbors	Roach Van Allen	color	14m	October 9, 1969	video
Boats	(ERPI); Ernest Horn, Arthur I. Gates, and Celeste C. Peardon	B&W	11m	December 21, 1938	video
Boats and Ships	Stanley Croner and Ernest Horn; camera: Isidore Mankofsky	color	16m	February 20, 1962	
Bobcat	Hugh and Suzanne Johnston (producers)	color	9m	1984	
Body Defenses Against Disease	(ERPI); Paul R. Cannon	B&W	10m	June 15, 1937	revised 1946; video
Body Defenses Against Disease (2nd edition)	William Kay	color	14m	1978	
Body Defenses Against Disease (3rd edition)	David Alexovich	color	22m	1989	video
Body Plans		color	24m	1990	
Booker T. Washington	(Emerson Film Corp.); John H. Franklin	B&W	18m	August 10, 1951	Famous Men & Women of the World
Boots and Her Kittens	Hugh and Suzanne Johnston (producers)	color	10m	1986	
Botany Series	T Hoshizaki	color	series of 8mm film loops	1969	titles: Testing for starch in green plants / Light requirement for starch production in green plants / Chromosomes-onion root tip preparation / Photosynthesis: chlorophyll requirement / Geotropism / Slime Mold
Bottle and Cup Feeding	Arnold Gesell	B&W	11m	February 25, 1947	Yale University of Child Development
A Boy Creates	Bert Van Bork	color	9m	July 25, 1971	
Boy of Botswana	(Visual Education Centre); H.J. Lemieux	color	17m	November 30, 1970	
The Brain	(Open University); Nick Watson (producer)	color	50m	1993	
The Brass Choir	(ERPI); James Brill, revised with Peter W. Dykema	B&W	10m	December 10, 1930	revised 1938
The Brass Choir (2nd edition)	Milan Herzog (producer); Ralph E. Rush; music: Hans Swarowsky & Vienna Symphony	color	11m	September 7, 1956	video
Brazil: People of the Highlands	John T. Bobbitt (producer), Preston E. James (collaborator)	color	17m	June 3, 1957	
Brazil: People of the Plantations	(ERPI); Earle K. James	B&W	10m	December 10, 1940	
Bread		B&W	11m	February 15, 1946	
Bread (2nd edition)	William Deneen; writer: Elmore Leonard	color	11m	May 13, 1960	video
Bread: from Wheat to Table	Paul Buchbinder	color	14m	1983	
Bring the World to the Classroom		B&W	19m	1938	promotional; video
Britain: Searching for a New Role	William Deneen & Barbara Ward Jackson	color	21m	December 30, 1965 (filmed '62)	
British Isles	Harold S. Kemp	B&W	11m	November 24, 1948	video
British Isles: The Land and the People	William Deneen and George Kish	color	21m	December 31, 1963	video
Brush Techniques: The Language of Watercolor	Eliot O'Hara	color	11m	August 13, 1947	video
Buffalo: An Ecological Success Story	John Walker (producer); Frances Haines	color	13m	May 4, 1972	video
The Builders	(ERPI)	B&W	10m	February 25, 1931	
Building a Highway	Warren P. Everote (producer); M. D. Lagaard	B&W	11m	November 24, 1948	video
Building a House	Warren Everote (producer); Paul Robert Hanna; camera: John Walker	B&W	11m	November 14, 1947	video
Building a House (2nd edition)	Milan Herzog (producer)	color	11m	August 28, 1963	video
Building America's Houses: Can Costs Be Reduced?	(Twentieth Century Fund); Miles L. Colean	B&W	11m	January 10, 1947	
Buma: African Sculpture Speaks	Henry R. Cassirer; script: Ladislas Segy	color	9m	November 10, 1952	
Burma: People of the River	Milan Herzog (producer); William Deneen and Clarence W Sorensen	color	14m	July 26, 1957	
The Bus Driver	Paul Robert Hanna	B&W	11m	February 15, 1946	video
Bushland Symphony (Australian Animals)		B&W	11m	May 20, 1949	
Business in Great Waters	(ERPI); Charles W. Barell	B&W	20m	March 29, 1930	
Butterflies	(ERPI)	B&W	10m	June 1, 1931	

== C ==
Title	Major credits	B&W or color	Running time	Year/copyright date	Notes
The Cactus: Adaptations for Survival	Ed Harris (producer); Charles E. Ackerman	color	11m	May 10, 1973	video
The Cactus: Profile of a Plant	Ed Harris (producer); Charles E. Ackerman	color	11m	January 10, 1973	video
The Cage	(Crocos Productions); John Barnes; camera: Adam Gifford; cast: Marcel Marceau	color	9m	April 4, 1975	Art of Silence; video
The Calendar: Our Record of Time	Ruth O. Bradley	color	11m	September 30, 1963	
Can Primitive People Survive?	(Reid-Cowan Productions); Richard Leiterman	color	24m	November 10, 1976	
Canada Goose Adventure	(Borden Productions)	color	11m	November 30, 1971	
Canada: The Atlantic Provinces	Mason Wade and J. Lewis Robinson	color	16m	September 3, 1958	video
Canada: The Industrial Provinces	Mason Wade and J. Lewis Robinson	color	17m	February 14, 1958	video
Canada: The Pacific Province	Mason Wade and J. Lewis Robinson	color	16m	September 3, 1958	
Canada: The Prairie Provinces	Mason Wade and J. Lewis Robinson	color	16m	December 31, 1958	video
Canada's Royal Canadian Mounted Police	William Deneen and C. W. Halverson	color	16m	February 24, 1961	video
The Canadians: Their Cities	(Visual Education Centre)	color	16m	April 26, 1974	
The Canadians: Their Land	(Visual Education Centre)	color	16m	April 26, 1974	
Canaletto	(Visual Images)	color	5m	1977	
Canals of England	(ERPI); Josoph A. Lauerys	B&W	20m	June 30, 1938	revised 1952
Cancer	Warren P. Everote (producer); William B. Wartman	B&W	12m	May 15, 1953	video
Canines, Pets and Predators	(Avatar Learning); Alan P. Sloan (producer); Donald R. Patten	color	23m	1980	
Captain Huff and Harry - Problem Solving: Consumer Mathematics	(Aesop Films Inc.)	color	15m	February 11, 1977 (completed 1975)	animated cartoon
Captain John Smith, Founder of Virginia	John Barnes; writer: Gilbert Aberg; art director: George Haslam; camera: Michael Livesey; editor Charles Hasse; cast: Edwin Richfield	B&W	20m	May 10, 1955	video
Carbon Fourteen	Warren P. Everote (producer)	B&W	12m	June 17, 1953 (completed '52)	University of Chicago, Division of Sciences Series
Care of Pets	Ernest P. Walker	B&W	11m	October 25, 1944	
Care of Pets (2nd edition)	Larry Yust; camera: Isidore Mankofsky	color	13m	March 16, 1962	video
Care of the Feet		B&W	10m	December 13, 1943	
Care of Hair and Nails	narrator: James Brill	B&W	11m	February 19, 1951	video
Care of the Skin	Francis Eugene Senear	B&W	11m	August 22, 1949	video
Careers in the Office: Applying for a Job	(Concept Films); Greg Heimer; camera: Isidore Mankofsky	color	13m	March 11, 1971	video
Careers in the Office: Choosing a Job	(Concept Films); Greg Heimer; camera: Isidore Mankofsky	color	13m	March 11, 1971	
Careers in the Office: Getting a Promotion	(Concept Films); Greg Heimer; camera: Isidore Mankofsky	color	13m	March 11, 1971	
Careers in the Office: Working Together'	(Concept Films); Greg Heimer; camera: Isidore Mankofsky	color	13m	March 11, 1971	
The Caretaker's Dilemma: Place Value'	(Davidson Films); Elizabeth Janeway	color	12m	August 11, 1975	Math That Counts
The Cask of Amontillado	Bernard Wilets	color	18m	December 1978	animated cartoon
Casualty Insurance	Warren P. Everote (producer)	B&W	20m	October 18, 1954	video
Catalysis	(ERPI); Hermann Irving Schlesinger	B&W	10m	October 15, 1937	video
Catching in Baseball	Jimmy Dykes and Hollis Thurston	B&W	11m	February 11, 1947	
The Cathedral of Speyer		color	17m	1983	video
Catholic Education	(ERPI); Parick Cardinal Hayes	B&W	10m	February 20, 1931	
Cattle Drive -A Day on a Western Range	(Viking Pictures); J Frank Dobie & G. H. Griffiths	color	11m	February 6, 1950	
Cattleman: A Rancher's Story	Robert H. Burns	color	22m	November 13, 1964	
Cattlemen	(ERPI); William M. Gregory	B&W	10m	December 21, 1939	
The Cave Community (Cumberland Caverns)	Bert Van Bork, Thomas C. Barr & Carl H. Krekeler	color	13m	April 25, 1961	video
Cave Dwellers of the Old Stone Age	Hallam L. Movius and Leroi-Gourhan	color	18m	February 16, 1960	video
Caves: The Dark Wilderness	Matthew N. Herman	color	22m	August 2, 1976	
Central America		B&W	11m	September 22, 1944	
Central America: Finding New Ways		color	17m	April 19, 1974	
Centralization and Decentralization	John T. Bobbitt (producer); James L. McCamy	B&W	17m	October 9, 1952	American Democracy; video
Cézanne	(Visual Images); David W. Powell, Cherill Anson	color	5m	1976	
Change Master Companies: Putting the Theory Into Action	(National Educational Media); Chuck Olin (producer); Rosabeth Moss Kanter	color	37m	1987	
The Changing Seasons	Jerry Haislmaier (producer); Barbara Wehr	color	14m	1981	
Charlemagne, Unifier of Europe	(Tadié Cinéma); Jean Hubert	color	13m	April 16, 1964	
A Charles Dickens Christmas	John Barnes; art director: Wilford Arnold; editor Carmen di Belieff; cast: Roddy Hughes	B&W	22m	July 17, 1956	video
Charting the Universe with Optical and Radio Telescopes	I. S. Bowen & Robert I. Johnson	color	13m	June 5, 1963	
Chartres Cathedral	John Barnes; writer: John Canaday; art director: C. Walter Hodges; camera: Archer Goodwin; editor: Robert Johnson	color	30m	January 14, 1963	video
Chaucer's England	John Barnes; art director: Wilford Arnold; camera: Alfred Hick; cast: Michael Goodliffe & Ernest Thesigner	color	30m	February 3, 1958	video
Cheetah	Jane and Peter Chermayeff	color	11m	1971	Silent Safari
Chemistry and a Changing World	(ERPI)	B&W	10m	December 26, 1940	revised 1953
Chemistry: Introductory Course	David W. Ridgway (producer); camera: Isidore Mankofsky; cast: John F. Baxter	B&W	series of 162 shorts (30m each)	1958	Titles include (incomplete): Chemical Reactions in the Animal Body / Colors of Aquo Complex Ions, Coordination Number / Metals and Metallurgy / Natural Polymers - Carbohydrates and Proteins / Rates of Chemical reactions / Some Aspects of Complex Ion Theory / Some Typical Biochemical Laboratory Tests / Sulfur Oxides—Sulfuric Acid
Chemistry of Heredity	(Milner-Fenwick)	color	2 parts (15m each)	1979	
The Cherry Orchard: Chekov - Innovator of Modern Drama	John Barnes; co-writer: Norris Houghton; art direction: Robert Gundliff; camera: Joseph Brun; editor: Robert Johnson; cast: Maureen Stapleton, John Colicos, Frances Sternhagen, and Donald Moffat & Lou Gilbert	color	20m	December 1967	
The Cherry Orchard: Comedy or Tragedy?	John Barnes; co-writer: Norris Houghton; art direction: Robert Gundliff; camera: Joseph Brun; editor: Robert Johnson; cast: Maureen Stapleton, John Colicos, Frances Sternhagen, Donald Moffat, and Lou Gilbert	color	20m	December 1967	
Chicago, Midland Metropolis	Bert Van Bork and Clarence W. Sorensen	color	22m	June 11, 1963	
Chicano from the Southwest	Julia Gonsalves; produced and directed by Maclovia Rodriguez	color	15m	April 28, 1970	Newcomers to the city; video
The Chick Embryo: from Streak to Hatching	David W. Ridgway (producer); K. T. Rogers and Ralph Buchsbaum	color	8m	October 11, 1960	Biology program, unit 3: Animal life; video
Child Growth	(ERPI); Charlotte Bühler	B&W	10m	August 10, 1930	
Child of the Philippines: No Time for Play	Bryan H. Easte (producer); Don Whyte; editor: Bill Henderson	color	14m	1979	
Children in Autumn	Milan Herzog (producer); Bruce Hoffman	color	11m	July 23, 1958	video
Children in Spring	Milan Herzog (producer); Dennis Johnson	color	11m	December 19, 1957	video
Children in Summer	Milan Herzog (producer); Dennis Johnson	color	11m	December 19, 1957	video
Children in Winter	Milan Herzog (producer); William R. Clark	color	11m	January 15, 1958	video
Children of China (Inside China)	(ERPI); L. C. Goodrich; camera: Amos Burg	B&W	10m	December 26, 1940	Children of Many Lands; video
Children of Germany: in the Rhineland		color	13m	March 25, 1955	Children of Many Lands
Children of Holland	(ERPI); Arthur I. Gates; revised with Celeste C. Perason and Milan Herzog producing	B&W	10m	November 3, 1939	Children of Many Lands; revised 1949; video
Children of Japan	(ERPI); Hugh Borton	B&W	11m	October 15, 1940	Children of Many Lands; video
Children of Scotland	Clarence W. Sorensen	color	13m	March 3, 1958	Children of Many Lands
Children of Switzerland	(ERPI); Arthur I. Gates and Celeste C. Peardon	B&W	10m	March 29, 1940	Children of Many Lands; video
Children of the Alps	(Condor Film); Henry Fueter (producer) - Otto Ritter	B&W	13m	October 13, 1950	Children of Many Lands; video
Chile: People of the Country Estates	(ERPI)	B&W	10m	December 24, 1940	video
China under Communism	Francis L.K. Hsu	B&W	22m	August 29, 1962	video
China: A Network of Communes	Ric Gentry; camera: Jens Bjerre	color	15m	December 1977	
China: A Portrait of the Land	(Magnum Films); Philip Gittelman (producer); René Burri (camera)	color	18m	September 8, 1967	
China's Industrial Revolution	(Magnum Films); Philip Gittelman (producer); René Burri (camera)	color	15m	September 15, 1967	video (black and white version)
China's Villages in Change	(Magnum Films); Philip Gittelman (producer); René Burri (camera)	color	20m	September 5, 1967	video
Choosing What to Buy	Howard Potter (producer); Michael A. MacDowell	color	15m	December 16, 1977 (completed '76)	video
Choosing What to Make	Howard Potter (producer); Michael A. MacDowell	color	15m	November 24, 1976	
Choosing Your Vocation	(ERPI); Harry D. Kitson	B&W	10m	February 27, 1931	
A Christmas Gift		color	5m	December 9, 1953	video;
Christmas in Germany: A Story of Giving	Bert Van Bork	color	24m	1979	video
Christmas Rhapsody	Milan Herzog (producer); music: Charles Henry	B&W	11m	September 13, 1948	video
Christmas through the Ages	Milan Herzog (producer); Charles S. Braden	color	14m	August 6, 1954	video
Chromosomes of Man	John Walker (producer); Sajiro Makino & Ralph Buchsbaum	B&W	21m	August 22, 1957	
The Circle of Life	Bert Van Bork (producer); script: Tony Hutz; animation: David Alexovich	color	21m	1983	
Circus!	Paul Buchbinder	color	15m	1984	
Circus Day in Our Town	Milan Herzog (producer); Grace Storm	B&W	11m	November 16, 1949	video
Circus Kids	Paul Buchbinder	color	16m	1984	video
Circus: Serrina Becomes an Acrobat	Milan Herzog (producer); William Vincent	color	11m	February 2, 1972	
Cities: How They Grow	Milan Herzog (producer); Robert S. Lynd	B&W	11m	May 13, 1953	video
The City	Gloria Cammarota	color	11m	October 29, 1962	video
City Boy of the Ivory Coast		color	16m	September 11, 1970	
City Bus Driver	Isidore Mankofsky	color	11m	August 29, 1962	video
City Government- Closest to the People	(Concept Films); Scott Anderson	color	20m	April 1, 1976 (completed '73)	
City in Winter	Roach Van Allen	color	10m	October 3, 1969	
City Water Supply	(ERPI); W. Rudolfs	B&W	10m	March 11, 1941	video
The Civil War	John Barnes; writer: Gilbert Alberg; camera: Louis Clyde Stoumen and Gordon Weisenborn	color	16m	May 12, 1954	video
Civilization in Chiapas	Roger Snodgrass; camera: Brian Capener	color	28m	1978	
Classical Civilization: Emperor and Slave'	John Barnes; writer: Mortimer Adler; cast: George Hagan, Simon Lac, and Mortimer J. Adler	color	29m	May 13, 1965	
Classical Civilization: The Spirit of Rome	John Barnes; writer: Charles Bell; cast: George Hagan, Simon Lac, and Mortimer J. Adler	color	29m	April 20, 1965	video
Classifying- Juggling Shapes, Sizes, Colors, Textures	Paul Buchbinder	color	14m	1980	video
Classifying Living Things	Bruce Hoffman	color	20m	1985	
Claudius, Boy of Ancient Rome	William Deneen and John Eadie; writer: Elmore Leonard	color	16m	July 9, 1964	video
The Climates of North America		color	17m	1962	video
Cloth: Fiber to Fabric	Bill Kay (producer); Emilie U. Lepthien; camera: Isidore Mankofsky	color	15m	August 27, 1968	
Clothing	(ERPI); Wallace Walter Atwood	B&W	10m	October 15, 1937	
Clothing (2nd edition)	John Barnes	color	11m	September 28, 1955 (completed '54)	video
Clowns: The Laugh Makers	(Avatar Learning); Alan P. Sloan (producer); Robert Boucher; script: Peter Kastner; narrator: Don Williams	color	24m	February 15, 1978	video
Coaching and Counseling: Management Tools for Improving Performance	Chuck Olin (producer); David W. Ross	color	22m	1985	
Coaching and Counselling: Case Studies	(National Educational Media)	color	15m	1987	
Colloids	(ERPI); Hermann Irving Schlesinger	B&W	10m	February 1, 1938	
Colombia and Venezuela	L. S. Rowe & William Manger	B&W	11m	December 19, 1944	video
Colombia and Venezuela (2nd edition)	Milan Herzog (producer); Preston E. James	color	17m	January 17, 1962	video
Colonial America: Life in the Maturing Colonies		color	17m	1991	
Colonial Children	(ERPI)	B&W	10m	January 2, 1940	video
Colonial Expansion (North America 1492-1763)	(ERPI); Henry S. Commager	B&W	11m	November 20, 1942	video
Coloquios Culturales	(Producciones Ancora Espana); Milan Herzog and John W. Oller (producers); Antonio Ribas; consultant: Angel González Araúzo	color	10 shorts (10m each)	1965	
Color	Paul Burnford	color	6m	August 18, 1954	Art in Action; video
Color Keying in Art and Living	narrator: James Brill	color	10m	April 26, 1951	video
Comb Jellies: Locomotion and Behavior		color	8mm film loops	1969	
Comets	Robert L. McDonell, advisor: Dave Smith; artists: Arlene Skarani, Anthony A. Morse, and Gloriana Gill	color	15m	1979	
Coming Back from a Stroke	Henry B. Betts, Arthur Dale Ericsson, and Howard G. Thistle	color	19m	1982	
Common Animals of the Woods	J.E. Hill	B&W	11m	December 28, 1943	video
The Common Cold	Warren P. Everote (producer); Thomas Francis Jr.	B&W	11m	June 2, 1949	
Communicating with the Public	Kenneth Zimmer	color	12m	March 17, 1971	video
Communities and How They Work		color	12m	1987	
The Community	Ralph Buchsbaum	color	11m	March 27, 1962	Biology program, unit 1: Ecology
Competition and Big Business	(Brookings Institution); "based on a study by" A. D. H. Kaplan	color	22m	April 27, 1953	video
Computer Glossery: or Coming to Terms with the Data Processing Machine	Charles and Ray Eames	color	10m	1973	video
Computers in Society	David Jay (producer); Bear McKay	color	17m	1983	
Concepts in Chemistry		color	series of 8mm film loops-(2m each)	July 6, 1964	titles: Buoyancy in Gas / Buoyancy in Liquids / Density / Phase Change / Volume
Conducting Good Music	Milan Herzog (producer); Ralph E. Rush; music: Hans Swarowsky & Vienna Symphony	color	11m	November 16, 1956	video
A Conflict of Interest	(Open University); Rissa de la Paz (producer); consultant: Marion Hall; camera: Tim Chard; editor Doug McLeod	color	25m	1993	
The Congress	John T. Bobbitt (producer); Hugh A. Bone	B&W	20m	December 9, 1954	video
The Coniferous Forest Biome	John Walker (producer); Ralph Buchsbaum & Orlando Park	color	16m	February 13, 1969	
The Conquest of the Spoon	Arnold Gesell	B&W	11m	February 25, 1947	Yale University of Child Development; video
Conservation of Natural Resources	(ERPI); Wallace Walter Atwood	B&W	11m	January 1, 1938	video
Constitution of the United States	(Chuck Olin Associates)	color	19m	1982	
The Constitution of the United States	Alpheus T. Mason	color	22m	February 28, 1956	video
Consumer Economics and You	Don Klugman	color	16m	December 6, 1976	
Consumer Economics: Making Decisions	(Chuck Olin Associates) Chuck Olin & Larry Hall	color	21m	1983	
Consumption of Foods		B&W	11m	May 31, 1946	World Food Problems
Continent of Africa (Lands Below the Sahara)	Paul Bohannan	color	21m	January 8, 1963	
Continental Drift: The Theory of Plate Techtonics	(American Geological Institute); Bert Van Bork (producer); Robert E. Boyer	color	22m	1980	
Control of Body Temperature	(ERPI)	B&W	10m	September 23, 1940	video
Controversy Over Industrial Pollution: A Case Study	Charles F. Finance (producer); Luther P. Gerlck; camera: Isidore Mankofsky	color	17m	November 29, 1972	
Controversy Over the Moon	Charles F. Finance; camera: Isidore Mankofsky	color	15m	March 31, 1971	video
Copper Mining and Smelting	(Viking Pictures); advisor: John R. Lewis	color	11m	February 6, 1950	video
Copper: from Quarry to Cable	(Institut for Film und Bild in Wissenschaft und Unterricht); writer: Hans Lehmbacker	color	13m	1994	
Corky the Crow	(Cathedral Films); John Walker (producer); John Calvin Reid	color	11m	May 31, 1960	
The Corn Farmer	(ERPI); William M. Gregory	B&W	10m	December 21, 1939	video
The Corn Farmer (2nd edition)	Larry Yust and W.N. Thompson	color	11m	July 19, 1960	video
Cotton		B&W	11m	May 31, 1946	
The Cotton Farmer	William Deneen and William L. Giles	color	14m	May 10, 1963	
A Cougar and Her Cubs	Barbara Wehr	color	11m	1983	
Country Vet	John Barnes (producer); Sidney Milburn; camera: Michael Livesey; editor : Robert Johnson	color	12m	April 13, 1972 (filmed '67)	
Cowboys and Broncbusters		B&W	11m	October 24, 1949	
Creation of a Portrait	J. R. Kray	color	11m	June 8, 1950	
Creation of the World	(Crocos Productions); John Barnes; camera: Adam Gifford; cast: Marcel Marceau	color	8m	April 16, 1975	Art of Silence
The Creative Approach to Education	(ERPI); Hughes Mearns	B&W	10m	January 1, 1931	
Crustaceans: Lobsters, Barnacles, Shrimp, and Their Relatives	William A. Anderson (producer); Frank A. Brown	color	13m	November 28, 1955	video
Culture and Costumes: The Great Clothes Put-On	John Barnes (producer) Robert Riley	color	15m	1974	

== D ==
Title	Major credits	B&W or color	Running time	Year/copyright date	Notes
DNA: Molecule of Heredity	Larry Yust and Dr. George Wells Beadle	color	16m	October 11, 1960	Biology program, unit 5: Heredity and Adaptive Change; video
Daniel Boone	(Emerson Film Corp.); Thomas D. Clark	B&W	18m	June 7, 1950	Famous Men & Women of the World
Daniel Webster	(Emerson Film Corp.); Arthur C. Cole	B&W	18m	January 2, 1951	Famous Men & Women of the World
The Danube: The Valley and Its People	George Kish (producer); William Deneen; writer: Elmore Leonard	color	14m	September 17, 1964	
Danzas Region Ales Espanolas (Regional Dances of Spain)	(Producciones Ancora Espana); Milan Herzog (producer); John W Oller	color	14m	March 21, 1966	
Dashes, Hurdles and Relays	(ERPI); Lawson Robertson	B&W	10m	March 1, 1938	
A Day at the Fair	Harry James Reed	B&W	11m	November 28, 1947	video
Daybreak (Over Monumental Valley)	Bert Van Bork	color	9m	January 21, 1977	
Days of the Week	(Centron Corporation); consultants: Carol Elsholz & Jane Polcyn	color	5m	1988	First Things First: Early Literacy Skills
The Declaration of Independence by the Colonies	Henry S. Commager	color	19m	March 23, 1956	
Deer Live with Danger	Les Blackcock	color	11m	November 17, 1952	video
Defending the City's Health	(ERPI)	B&W	10m	December 26, 1941	video
Defensive Footwork in Basketball	Wilbur Johns	B&W	11m	May 31, 1946	video
Degas	(Visual Images); David W. Powell, Cherill Anson and Evelyn Anderson; narrator: Peter S. Vogt	color	7m	1973	Art of Awareness (National Gallery of Art)
Demetri Alexandros' Dive	Athenagoras Aneste, George Louris, Emmanuel Vergis, and George Konstantopoulos	color	9m	July 16, 1977	
Democracy	Harold Lasswell	B&W	11m	March 1, 1946	video
Democracy and Deposition (Defining Democracy)		B&W	18m	March 19, 1954	video
Desert Arabs		B&W	11m	April 13, 1948	
The Desert	Michael Birch (producer); Richard Bunchsbaum, and Charles E. Olmsted	color	22m	February 27, 1962	Biology program, unit 1: Ecology; revised 1971
The Desert	Scott W. Benton	color	11m	1988	
The Desert Community	Bert Van Bork	color	11m	November 11, 1965	Basic life science series, unit 5: Plant and animal relationships
The Deserted Village	A.J.H. Pullinger (producer); Clarence W. Hach & Oliver Goldsmith	color	17m	April 17, 1971	
Despotism	Harold Lasswell	B&W	11m	March 1, 1946	video
Development of Communication		B&W	11m	July 20, 1946 (completed 1942)	video
Development of Communications from Telegraph to TV		B&W	10m	June 27, 1955	
The Development of Education	(ERPI)	B&W	10m	April 2, 1942	
The Development of Transportation	(ERPI)	B&W	10m	December 1, 1931	video
The Development of Transportation	Ralph E. Turner	color	11m	August 6, 1958	video
A Dialogue for This Decade: C. V. Narasimhan		B&W	20m	August 7, 1962	
A Dialogue for This Decade: George W. Beadle		B&W	20m	June 5, 1962	
A Dialogue for This Decade: Lady Barbara Ward Jackson		B&W	20m	July 9, 1962	
A Dialogue for This Decade: Newton Minow		B&W	20m	June 21, 1962	
A Dialogue for This Decade: Paul C. Asidou		B&W	20m	July 9, 1962	
A Dialogue for This Decade: Sterling McMurrin		B&W	20m	June 5, 1962	
Diffusion and Osmosis	Stanley Croner (producer); Charles F. Finance	color	14m	August 24, 1973	video
Digestion of Food	(ERPI); A. J. Carlson	B&W	10m	January 15, 1938	video
The Digestive System	Horace Davenport	color	7m	October 18, 1965	video
The Digestive System (revised)	Bruce Hoffman	color	19m	1981	video
Dinosaurs: The Terrible Lizards	Matthew N. Herman (producer); Graham Lee Mahim	color	24m	December 29, 1976	video
Directing A Film: Ionesco's The New Tenant	Larry Yust	color	17m	December 12, 1975	Short Play Showcase; video
Discovering the Forest	Thomas G. Smith (producer)	color	11m	December 8, 1966	Basic life science series, unit 5: Plant and animal relationships
Discovery and Exploration	(ERPI)	B&W	10m	December 30, 1942	video
A Discussion in History		B&W	21m	February 19, 1951	Teaching by Discussion
A Discussion in the Physical Sciences		B&W	21m	February 19, 1951	Teaching by Discussion
A Discussion in the Social Sciences		B&W	21m	November 9, 1950	Teaching by Discussion
A Discussion of Edgar Allan Poe's The Fall of the House of Usher	(Avatar Learning); Alan P. Sloan (producer); Guerdon Trueblood; host: Ray Bradbury	color	11m	February 20, 1976	Short Story Showcase; video
A Discussion of Ernest Hemingway's My Old Man	Larry Yust & Clifton Fadiman; host: Blake Nevius	color	11m	January 28, 1970	Short Story Showcase; video
A Discussion of Frank Stockton's The Lady, or the Tiger?	Larry Yust & Clifton Fadiman	color	10m	March 2, 1970	Short Story Showcase; video
A Discussion of Fyodor Dostoevsky's The Crocodile	Larry Yust & Clifton Fadiman	color	10m	March 1, 1973	Short Story Showcase; video
A Discussion of Herman Melville's Bartleby	Larry Yust and Clifton Fadiman; host: Charles Van Doren	color	10m	October 10, 1969	Short Story Showcase; video
A Discussion of Joseph Conrad's The Secret Sharer	Larry Yust & Clifton Fadiman; host: Charles Van Doren	color	10m	March 1, 1973	Short Story Showcase; video
A Discussion of Nathaniel Hawthorne's Dr. Heidegger's Experiment	Larry Yust & Clifton Fadiman	color	11m	November 26, 1969	Short Story Showcase; video
A Discussion of Shirley Jackson's The Lottery	Larry Yust & Clifton Fadiman; host: James Durbin	color	10m	October 17, 1969	Short Story Showcase; video
Distance Races	(ERPI); Lawson Robertson; revised with Dean Cromwell & Brutus Hamilton	B&W	10m	May 17, 1938	revised 1946; video
Distributing America's Goods - What Does It Cost?		B&W	11m	March 14, 1946	
Distributing Heat Energy	(ERPI); H. Horton Sheldon	B&W	10m	December 6, 1938	revised 1946; video
Distribution of Foods		B&W	11m	May 31, 1946	World Food Problems; video
Distribution of Plants and Animals	John Walker (producer); Ralph Buchsbaum	color	16m	September 18, 1965	Biology program, unit 1: Ecology
The Doctor	Warren P. Everote (producer); Louis W. Sauer	B&W	11m	December 3, 1947	video
The Doctor	I. Blanche Bourne	color	17m	June 18, 1968	
Dr. Heidegger's Experiment	Larry Yust & Clifton Fadiman; camera: Isidore Mankofsky; cast: Peter Brocco, Richard Hale, Edward Schaaf, Robert Guthrie, John Barclay, Leslie Bradley and others	color	21m	October 12, 1969	Short Story Showcase; second part: A Discussion of...; video
Dr. Leakey and the Dawn of Man	National Geographic Society	color	26m	June 23, 1967	
The Dodder	(ERPI); (George) Clyde Fisher	B&W	10m	February 25, 1931	
A Doll's House	John Barnes; writer: Norris Houghton; camera: Joseph Brun; editor: Robert Johnson; cast: Frances Sternhagen & Paul Sparer	color	2 parts (33m/28m)	January 11, 1968	
Dolls of Many Lands		color	9m	March 20, 1957	video
Dolphins in the Zoo	Paul Witty (producer); George Rabb and Paul Buchbinder; narrator: Randy Brill	color	11m	1979	video
Don't Be Afraid	Hal Kopel (producer); Rose H. Alschuler	B&W	12m	August 5, 1953 (completed '52)	video
Don't Get Angry	Milan Herzog (producer); Rose H. Alschuler; narrator: Ken Nodine	B&W	12m	March 16, 1953	video
Drawing with Pencil	Theodore Kautzky	B&W	11m	November 17, 1947	video
The Dream	(Crocos Productions); John Barnes; camera: Adam Gifford; cast: Marcel Marceau	color	8m	August 4, 1975	Art of Silence
Dress for Health	Pattric Ruth O'Keefe	color	10m	October 27, 1957	video
Drive Defensively!		color	11m	June 16, 1959	video
Drug Addiction	Andrew C. Ivy; narrator: James Brill; cast: John Galvarro	B&W	22m	January 15, 1952	video
The Drug Problem: What Do You Think?	Stanley Croner (producer); Charles Gorodetsky	color	18m	January 19, 1973	
Dynamic	(ERPI); William H. Kilpatrick	B&W	10m	February 24, 1931	

== E ==
Title	Major credits	B&W or color	Running time	Year/copyright date	Notes
Early Play	Arnold Gesell	B&W	11m	February 25, 1947	Yale University of Child Development
Early Settlers of New England: Salem 1626-1629	(ERPI); Chester R. Arnold	B&W	11m	December 18, 1940	video
Early Social Behavior	(ERPI); Arnold Gesell	B&W	11m	February 4, 1935	Yale University of Child Development
Early Victorian England and Charles Dickens'	John Barnes and Douglas Campbell; writer: Clifton Fadiman; art director: C. Walter Hodges	color	34m	March 8, 1962	video
The Ears and Hearing	Warren P. Everote (producer); H G Kobrak, John Ralston Lindsay, and Henry B. Perlman; camera: John Walker and Andrew Costikyan	B&W	11m	January 20, 1950	video
The Ears and Hearing	Charles F. Finance (producer); Richard Barlow	color	22m	August 2, 1969	Biology program, unit 4: Physiology; video
The Ears of King Midas	(Greatest Tales Inc.); Fred Ladd	color	10m	January 3, 1978	animated cartoon
The Earth in Change: The Earth's Crust	Jeffrey Osier	color	16m	December 5, 1961	video
The Earth in Motion	(ERPI); Walter Bartky	B&W	10m	November 15, 1936	video
Earth Satellites - Explorers of Outer Space		color	17m	December 31, 1958	video
Earth Science: Exploring Planet Earth	Bert Van Bork (producer)	color	20m	1978	video
Earth: Man's Home	Charles M. Davis	color	10m	February 24, 1970	
Earthquakes: A Lesson in Disaster	Bert Van Bork (producer)	color	15m	August 27, 1971	
Earthquakes: Exploring Earth's Restless Crust	(American Geological Institute); Bert Van Bork (producer)	color	22m	1983	video
The Earthworm: Nature's Plowman'	(Science Pictures); David Spears, Paul Clayton and Madeleine Spears; camera: Richard Kirby and Tracey Penn; editors: Eric Robert and Anna Newton; editors: Ray Cooper and Patrick Flower	color	12m	1991	
Easing the Pain	(Open University); Rissa de la Paz (producer); consultants: Chris Wells, John Miles, and Eric Ghadiali; editor: Andrew Cowin; camera: Manford Mueller	color	25m	1993	
East Africa: Kenya, Tanganyika, Uganda	Paul Bohannan	color	21m	July 27, 1962	video
An Easter Surprise		color	6m	November 6, 1953	
Eat for Health	Hugh and Suzanne Johnston	color	8m	September 30, 1954	video
Eat for Health (2nd edition)	Hugh and Suzanne Johnston (producers); Barbara Wehr	color	8m	1981	
Echinoderms: Sea Stars and Their Relatives	Bert Van Bork (producer); Ralph Buchsbaum	color	16m	December 5, 1961	Biology program, unit 3: Animal life
Echinoderms, Sea Stars and Their Relatives (2nd edition)	Scott W. Benton	color	13m	1987	video
Eclipses of the Sun and Moon	Jeffrey Osier	color	11m	February 4, 1966	video
Eclipses of the Sun and Moon (2nd edition)	Jeffrey Osier; consultants: William Buscombe and Robert Deem	color	10m	1989	
Ecology of a Hot Spring	Bert Van Bork (producer); Thomas Brock	color	15m	1972	Biology program, unit 1: Ecology video
Ecology: Barry Commoner's Viewpoint	James Oliver (producer); music: Kent Smith; animation: John Haugse	color	18m	July 5, 1977	
Editing Synge's The Well of the Saints	Larry Yust	color	13m	April 15, 1976	Short Play Showcase; video:
Eggs	G. F. Stewart	B&W	11m	October 18, 1946	video
Egypt and the Nile	Donald G. Hoffman (producer); Clarence W. Sorensen	color	16m	June 3, 1954	video
Egypt: Cradle of Civilization	William Deneen	color	11m	September 28, 1962	
Electing the President	Dennis S. Johnson	color	30m	1983	
Electric Circuits: You Can Do It	Philip Stockton (producer); Scott W. Benton	color	12m	1986	
Electricity and How It Is Made	Albert Piltz	color	16m	June 9, 1964	video
Electricity: How to Make a Circuit	Donald A. Boyer	color	11m	May 19, 1959	
Electrochemistry	(ERPI); Hermann Irving Schlesinger	B&W	10m	March 10, 1937	video
Electrodynamics	(ERPI); Walter Bartky	B&W	10m	November 15, 1936	revised 1946
Electromagnets - How They Work		color	11m	March 24, 1960	
Electrons	(ERPI); Harvey B. Lemon	B&W	10m	March 10, 1937	revised 1946; video
Electrons at Work	Larry Yust & Albert V. Baez; camera: Isidore Mankofsky	color	16m	August 15, 1961	
Electrostatics	(ERPI); Hermann Irving Schlesinger & Harvey B. Lemon	B&W	10m	March 17, 1933	revised 1950; video &
The Elementary Teacher as a Guide	(ERPI); Boyd Henry Bode	B&W	20m	February 27, 1931	
Elements of Electrical Circuits	(ERPI)	B&W	10m	December 16, 1943	video
Elephant	Jane & Peter Chermayeff	color	11m	1971	Silent Safari, video excerpt
Elephant Baby	Milan Herzog (producer); Ruth O. Bradley	color	11m	December 31, 1958	video
Elephants (Elephant Tricks)	(ERPI); Ernest Horn, Arthur I. Gates, and Celeste C. Pearson	B&W	11m	September 20, 1940	video
Eli Whitney	(Emerson Film Corp.); Harold F. Williamson	B&W	18m	August 10, 1951	Famous Men & Women of the World; video
Emergency Care- to Save a Life	Vera Morkovin & Dale Collier	color	10m	1979	
Emilio En Españan (Level 2)	(Producciones Ancora Espana); Milan Herzog and John W. Oller (producers); Antonio Ribas; consultant: Angel González Araúzo	color	27 shorts (10m each)	1964	
Emilio En Españan (Level 3)	(Producciones Ancora Espana); Milan Herzog and John W. Oller (producers); Antonio Ribas; consultant: Angel González Araúzo	color	10 shorts (10m each)	1965	
Emilio En Españan: Lesson 11 Campos Manchegos	(Producciones Ancora Espana), Milan Herzog, and John W. Oller (producers); Antonio Ribas; consultant: Angel González Araúzo	color	7m	1964	video
Emilio En Españan: Lesson 12 Molinos de Viento	(Producciones Ancora Espana), Milan Herzog, and John W. Oller (producers); Antonio Ribas; consultant: Angel González Araúzo	color	7m	1964	video
Endangered Animals: Will They Survive?	(Reid-Cowan Productions-Avatar Learning); Thomas R. Howell	color	24m	July 6, 1976	
Endocrine Glands	(ERPI)	B&W	10m	January 2, 1940	video
The Endrocine System	Bruce Hoffman (producer), William V. Mayer, and Richard L. Landau	color	20m	1982	video
Energy and Its Transformations	Harvey B. Lemon and Hermann Irving Schlesinger	B&W	11m	June 18, 1946	video
Energy and Magnetism (series)		B&W	series of shorts (30m each)	1957	titles: Alternating Current Theory / Capacitance / Coulomb's Law: Electrostatics / Coulomb's Law: Magnetism Laboratory / Effects Of Electric Currents / The Electric Field And Potential / Electric Motors / Electrical Equivalent Of Heat: Laboratory / Electricity At Rest / Electricity In Motion / Electromotive Force Of A Battery Cell: Laboratory / Induced Electric Currents / Magnetic Fields / Magnetic Induction / Magnetism / Ohm's Law / Parallel Circuits / Parallel Resistances: Laboratory / Potential Divider: Laboratory / Series Circuits: Laboratory / Study Of Motors: Laboratory / Transformers / Transformers: Laboratory
Energy and Work	Larry Yust; camera: Isidore Mankofsky	color	11m	July 6, 1961	video
Energy for the Future	(American Geological Institute); Bert Van Bork (producer); Robert E. Boyer	color	17m	December 10, 1974	
Energy from the Sun	William H. Matthews	color	11m	April 7, 1955	video
Energy from the Sun (2nd edition)	Bert Van Bork	color	18m	1980	
Energy: A Matter of Choices	Charles F. Finance (producer); Luther P. Gerlach	color	22m	December 7, 1973	video
England in the Middle Ages	(Boulton-Hawker Films); David Boulton	color	30m	1981	
The English and Dutch Explorers	Theodore E. Layng	color	11m	November 22, 1965	
English Children: Life in the City	Harold S. Kemp	B&W	11m	February 23, 1949	Children of Many Lands; video
English Life: Life in Sheffield	Dirk Campbell	color	22m	July 21, 1975	
The Environment: Everything around Us	William Kay (producer); Albert Larson	color	13m	May 23, 1972	
Equality under Law: The California Fair Housing Cases	editor: Meredith Lefcourt and Frederic Goodrich; camera: Kenneth Plotin	color	20m	October 7, 1969	
Equality under Law: The Lost Generation of Prince Edward County	John Barnes (producer); writer: Linda Gottlieb	color	25m	August 22, 1967	completed in 1966; video
Erosion and Weathering: Looking at the Land	Bert Van Bork & Peter Fenner; script: James Clark	color	17m	November 22, 1976	
Erosion: Leveling the Land	Stanley Croner (producer); Bill Varney & John S Shelton; camera: Isidore Mankofsky	color	14m	July 6, 1964	
Eskimo Children	(ERPI); Henry B. Collins	B&W	10m	December 29, 1941	Children of Many Lands; video
Eskimo Family	William Deneen	color	17m	December 11, 1959	video
Eskimos- Winter in Western Alaska	Frederick Machetanz	color	10m	September 18, 1950	video
Eugene Ionesco's The New Tennant	Larry Yust & Clifton Fadiman; camera: Isidore Mankofsky; art dir: Peter Parasheles; cast: Paul Schumacher, Eve McVeagh, Carl Byrd, John Crawford	color	31m	November 13, 1975	Short Story Showcase; video
Europe (Geography of Europe)	(KAS Studio Ava); Jiri Vanek (producer); Rudolf Krejcik; co-writer: Jeffery Osier	color	4 shorts (20m each)	1993	titles: Insular Region / Northern Region / Southern Region / Western Region
Europe Explores America: Northern Voyages and Settlements		color	16m	1991	
Europe Explores America: Southern Voyages and Settlements		color	16m	1991	
The Everglades: Conserving a Balanced Community	Paul Buchbinder	color	12m	1987	
Evidence for Molecules and Atoms	Larry Yust (producer); Stanley Croner and Albert V. Baez; camera: Isidore Mankofsky	color	19m	September 19, 1961	video
Evidence for the Ice Age	(American Geological Institute); Stanley Croner (producer); Charles F. Finance, and Gary W. Lopez; camera: Isidore Mankofsky	color	19m	March 16, 1965	revised 1988; video
Evolution of Landscapes	Bert Van Bork (producer)	color	18m	1986	
Evolution of Vascular Plants: The Ferns	Howard Arnott and Ralph Buchabaum	color	16m	September 12, 1962	
Exercise and Physical Fitness	Kent Smith (producer); Gerald Gardner	color	22m	December 7, 1973	
Exercise for Happy Living	Arthur H Steinhaus	B&W	11m	November 30, 1950	
Expanding Math Skills with the Minicalculator: Introduction	(Aesop Films Inc.-National Semiconductor Corp.); Marvin L. Sohns	color	16m	April 26, 1977	part animated cartoon
Expanding Math Skills with the Minicalculator: The Winner	(Aesop Films Inc.-National Semiconductor Corp.); Marvin L. Sohns	color	16m	April 26, 1977	part animated cartoon
Experimenting with Animals, White Rats		color	10m	August 5, 1966	Basic Life Sciences, Animals with Backbones
Experiments in Physics	Thomas G. Smith (producer);	color	series of 8mm film loops	1970	titles: Cathode-ray Oscilloscope: Historical introduction. / Some elementary things an oscilloscope can do / The function of the amplifier in the oscilloscope / Electron gun 2--electron focusing / Phase and the oscilloscope / Oscilloscope controls and their functions / Frequency measurement 2--time base / Frequency measurement I--time base
Experiments in Physics (second series)	(Kaye Instrument Company); Thomas G. Smith (producer); Albert V. Baez, Colan Powel & Homar Bosserman; camera: Isidore Mankofsky	color	series of 8mm loop films (4m each)	1971	titles: Computer Animated Standing Waves in a Spring / Parametric Variations / Reflection of Pulses Parts 1 & 2 / Superimposition of Pulses / Supersition of Pulses
Explaining Matter: Atoms and Molecules	Hal Kopel (producer); Larry Yust & Kenneth E. Vordenberg; camera: Isidore Mankofsky	color	13m	November 27, 1958	
Explaining Matter: Chemical Change	Larry Yust, Robert Deem & Theodore A. Ansbacher	color	11m	July 19, 1960	
Explaining Matter: Chemical Change (2nd edition)	David Jay	color	16m	1982	
Explaining Matter: Evidence for the Atomic-Molecular Theory	David Jay	color	16m	1982	
Explaining Matter: Molecules in Motion	George Gamow	color	11m	December 31, 1958	
Exploring the Night Sky	Milan Herzog (producer); F. W. Schlesinger	B&W	10m	April 5, 1956	video
Exploring the Universe	(ERPI); Walter Bartky	B&W	10m	May 1, 1937	video
The Eyes and Seeing	Stanley Croner (producer); Charles F. Finance, Jerome T. Pearlman, and Ralph Buchsbaum	color	16m	April 18, 1968	Biology program, unit 4: Physiology
Eyes and Their Care	(ERPI); Collaborators: Department of Ophthalmology at College of Medicine, New York University and College of Physicians and Surgeons, Columbia University	B&W	11m	December 21, 1941	video
Eyes and Vision	Margaret McKibben Lawler (advisor)	color	10m	August 30, 1963	

== F ==
Title	Major credits	B&W or color	Running time	Year/copyright date	Notes
Face of the Earth	Paul Burnford & Arthur L. Swerdloff	color	11m	November 18, 1953	video
Fact of the Earth (2nd edition)		color	10m	1975	
The Fall of the House of Usher	(Avatar Learning); Alan P. Sloan (producer); Guerdon Trueblood; cast: cast: Clifford David, Michael MacRae, Logan Ramsey, Tara Leigh	color	2 parts (30m/12m)	February 20, 1976	Short Story Showcase; second part: A Discussion of Edgar Allan Poe's The Fall of the House of Usher; video
Falling Water	Bert Van Bork (producer)	color	13m	1987	
La Familia Fernández	Milan Herzog (producer); Irving Rusinow & John W. Oller; consultant: Angel González Araúzo	color	series of shorts (40m approx., 54 completed by 1963)	1962	
La Familia Fernández: Otra Carta	Milan Herzog (producer); Irving Rusinow & John W. Oller; consultant: Angel González Araúzo	color	10m	1963	video
Far Western States	(ERPI)	B&W	10m	December 31, 1942	video
Far Western States (2nd edition)	Carl Dudley (producer)	color	11m	June 3, 1955	video
Farm Animals	(ERPI); Ernest Horn & Arthur I. Gates	B&W	10m	October 15, 1937	
Farm Animals (2nd edition)	John Walker	color	11m	February 6, 1957	
The Farm Community		color	14m	February 12, 1969	
Farm Family in Autumn	Thomas G. Smith & E. Laurence Palmer	color	15m	September 8, 1967	video
Farm Family in Spring'	Thomas G. Smith & E. Laurence Palmer	color	15m	February 22, 1968	video
Farm Family in Summer'	Thomas G. Smith & E. Laurence Palmer	color	15m	June 7, 1968	video
Farm Family in Winter	Thomas G. Smith & E. Laurence Palmer	color	15m	September 8, 1967	video
The Farmer	Milan Herzog (producer)	B&W	14m	May 5, 1954	video
The Farmer in a Changing America	John Barnes (producer); James P. Shelton	color	27m	July 6, 1973 (filmed 1969)	
The Faroe Islands Family	(Nordisk Films-Statens Filmcentral)	B&W	11m	October 19, 1953	
The Farrier: Shoeing a Horse	(Silver Dollar Inc.); Claude Locke	color	10m	1979	
FDR and World War Two		B&W	17m	1980	
The Federal Reserve System: Origin, Purpose and Functions	James W Angell & Frank Cellier	B&W	23m	October 5, 1950	video
A Few Tests of Child Intelligence	(ERPI); Ina Craig Sartorius	B&W	10m	September 12, 1930	
Fiber Optics	(Science Pictures); Madeleine Spears (producer); Chris Barmer; camera: Tracy Gow & David Spears; graphics: Anna Newton; consultant: Robert Applebaum	color	16m	1992	video
A Field Becomes a Town		color	14m	October 27, 1970	
The Fig Tree		color	10m	1971	
Filbert and the Melon Cheater: Subtraction with Borrowing	(Davidson Films); Elizabeth Janeway	color	12m	October 9, 1975	Math That Counts
Finding His Voice	(Western Electric Company); F. Lyle Goldman; animation producer: Max Fleischer	B&W	10m	June 21, 1929	part animated cartoon video
Fire	Warren P. Everote (producer); Charles K. Arey; camera: John Walker	B&W	11m	February 26, 1947	video
Fire, Friend and Foe	(Avatar Learning); Joy B. Day	color	23m	1977	
Fire in the Sea (Hawaiian Volcanoes)	Bert Van Bork (producer)	color	10m	May 10, 1973	
Fire Mountain (Mt. Kilauea, Hawaii)	Bert Van Bork	color	9m	June 17, 1970	video
Fire Prevention (In the Home)		B&W	14m	June 25, 1951	
Fire: What Makes It Burn	Illa Podendorf	color	11m	August 16, 1962	video
The Fireman	(ERPI); Ernest Horn	B&W	10m	November 3, 1939	
The Fireman	Milan Herzog (producer); Ernest Horn	color	11m	October 8, 1954	video
First Aid Filmettes	(American Red Cross)	B&W	6 shorts (2m each)	April 6, 1951	titles: Artificial Respiration / Care of Wounds / Control of Bleeding / Extensive Burns / Splinting a Fracture / Treatment for Shock
First Aid on the Spot	(American Red Cross)	B&W	11m	April 26, 1951	revised 1959; video
First Aid on the Spot	Vera Morkovin & Dale Collier	color	10m	1980	video
First Aid: Wounds and Fractures	(ERPI)	B&W	10m	December 30, 1941	
First Chicago: Case Study No. 2 Banking on Quality	(Marchis Productions-National Educational Media); Mike Wright (producer); camera: Hal Bernstein, George Peebles & Mike Griffin; editor: Mary Frisoli; audio: Dave Durham, John Crisp & Les Stolarczyk; music: Nick Sanabria	color	21m	1991	
First Fifty: EBE's Golden Anniversary Retrospective		color	17m	1978	video
The First Many-Celled Animals: Sponges	John Walker (producer)	color	17m	March 8, 1962	Biology program, unit 3: Animal life; video
First Men Into Space: Solving the Space Survival Problems		color	16m	February 14, 1962	video
The Fish Embryo: From Fertilization to Harching (Le Développement Embryonnaire du Poisson / Zebra Fish)	National Film Board of Canada	color	27m	1961	Biology program, unit 3: Animal life; (edited down for American release)
The Fish in a Changing Environment	Thomas G. Smith & William P. Braker	color	11m	December 6, 1966	Basic Life Sciences, Animals with Backbones
The Fish That Nearly Drowned	(Moscow Educational Films)	color	10m	1966	
5000 Brains: The Story of the New Britannica	Tom Hollyman	color	27m	1974	
Flatboatman of the Frontier: Ohio Valley Farmers, 1790-1820	(ERPI); Thomas D. Clark	B&W	11m	December 26, 1941	video
Flatworms: Platyhelminthes'	John Walker (producer); Ralph Buchsbaum	color	16m	September 12, 1962	Biology program, unit 3: Animal life
Flies and Mosquitoes: Their Life Cycle and Control	Paul Burnford (producer); Norman Bean; collaborator, Charles L. Hogue	color	10m	1964	
Flood Forecasting	Bert Von Bork (producer);	color	20m	1986	video
Florida: Spanish Colony to American State	(Advanced American Communications); Robert C. Peters & B. Don Greene (producer); Glenn & Karen Winters	color	17m	1990	
Flowering	Barrie Whatley (producer); Andrew Crilly	color	25m	1990	
Flowering Plants and Their Parts	Charles L. Finance & George I. Schwartz; camera: Isidore Mankofsky	color	16m	December 6, 1966	Basic Life Sciences, The World of Green Plants
Flowers Are Forever	Jerry Haislmaier	color	21m	1983	
Flowers at Work	(ERPI); (George) Clyde Fisher	B&W	10m	1931	video
Flowers at Work (2nd edition)	John Walker (producer); William M. Harlow	color	10m	April 20, 1956	video
Flowers at Work (3rd edition)	William V. Mayer	color	15m	1983	video
Flying a Kite	Willard Abraham & John Barnes	color	5m	October 2, 1952	
Fog	Bert Van Bork (producer)	color	9m	September 24, 1971	
Food	Hermann D. Tauchert (producer); Edward P. Storke	color	12m	1979	video
Food and Nutrition		color	10m	1940	video
Food and People: An Introduction to the World's Food Problems	Charles Benton	B&W	28m	November 10, 1955	
Food from Our Garden	(Crawley Films)	color	10m	July 24, 1952	
Food from the Sun	Thomas G. Smith & John Wagner	color	9m	July 4, 1966	Basic Life Sciences, The World of Living Things; video
The Food Store		B&W	11m	February 15, 1946	
The Food Store (2nd edition)	Marjorie D. Sharp	color	13m	September 27, 1957	
Foods and Nutrition	(ERPI)	B&W	10m	January 2, 1940	video
For Your Baby: Postnatal Care	(National Educational Media); Judith Conaway (producer); Ned Miller; editors: Suzanne Rosen & Randy McLeod	color	15m	1990	
For Your Baby: Prenatal Care	(National Educational Media); Judith Conaway (producer); Ned Miller; editors: Suzanne Rosen & Randy McLeod	color	15m	1990	
Forces	Larry Yust (producer); Stanley Croner; camera: Isidore Mankofsky	color	15m	August 15, 1961	
Forest Conservation	(New York Zoological Society); George Brewer (producer); John H. Storer	color	11m	September 8, 1949	The Living Forest; video
The Forest Grows	(New York Zoological Society); George Brewer (producer); John H. Storer	color	11m	September 8, 1949	The Living Forest
The Forest Produces	(New York Zoological Society); George Brewer (producer); John H. Storer	color	11m	September 8, 1949	The Living Forest; video
Forest Ranger	(Viking Pictures); Gordon D. Marckworth	color	12m	June 17, 1953	
Form	Paul Burnford	color	6m	August 18, 1954	Art in Action; video
Fossils: Exploring the Past	Bert Van Bork & William H. Mathews	color	16m	1978	
The Fox and the Rooster	Warren P. Everote (producer); Grace E Storm; camera: Lynwood Chase	B&W	11m	June 25, 1951	video
Fox Hunt in Italy	F. W. Von Keller & E. S. Von Keller; camera: Jack Cardiff	color	10m	August 19, 1953	re-edit of a 1938 "World Windows" short Fox Hunting In The Roman Campagna
Fragonard	(Visual Images); David W. Powell & Cherill Anson; narrator: Peter S. Vogt	color	7m	1973	Art of Awareness (National Gallery of Art)
France and Its People	Milan Herzog (producer)	B&W	13m	May 2, 1955	video
France in the New World (Colonial Life in Canada)	William Deneen & John Irwin Cooper	color	16m	January 9, 1963	
Frank and His Dog	John Barnes & Gordon Weisenborn	color	5m41s	October 2, 1952	video
Frank Tends the Garden		color	5m	October 2, 1952	video
Frederick Douglass	Benjamin Quarles & Sterling Stuckey	color	9m	January 7, 1972	
Free Press Vs. Fair Trial By Jury- the Sheppard Case	Stanley Croner; editor: James Kennedy; camera: Alan Capps & Isidore Mankofsky	color	27m	August 26, 1969	video
Freedom of Religion	Bernard Wilets	color	19m	1982	
Freedom to Speak, People of New York Vs. Irving Feiner	John Barnes (producer); Robert Q. Lovett; writer: Linda Gottlieb; camera: Isidore Mankofsky	color	23m	July 20, 1967	video
Freight Train		color	12m	1979	
The Freight Train (2nd edition)	Milan Herzog (producer); Paul Robert Hanna	B&W	11m	January 24, 1955	video
French and Indian War: Seven Years' War in America	William Deneen; collaborators: John Irwin Cooper & Howard Peckham	color	16m	March 9, 1962	video
French Canadian Children	(ERPI); John Walker	B&W	10m	May 27, 1940	Children of Many Lands
French Children (Une Famille Bretonne)	Milan Herzog (producer); Elton Hocking	B&W	11m	April 16, 1948	Children of Many Lands; video
The French Explorers	(Crawley Films) Theodore E. Laying	color	11m	October 4, 1965	
The French Revolution: Death of the Old Regime	(NBC News)	color	18m	1966	video
The Fresh Water Pond	John Walker (producer); Robert W. Hull	color	13m	September 5, 1961	revised in 1985 with producer Scott W. Benton
The Frog	(ERPI); (George) Clyde Fisher	B&W	10m	February 24, 1931	
The Frog (2nd edition)		color	11m	June 14, 1957	
The Frog		color	series of 8mm loop shorts (3-4m each)	March 4, 1965	titles: The Anatomy of the Central Nervous System / The Breathing and Respiration / Circulation (Arteries) / Circulation (Veins) / The Digestive System / The External Anatomy / The Pithing / The Preparation of a Spinal Frog / The Reproduction and Urinary Systems of the Female / The Reproduction and Urinary Systems of the Male / The Simple Reflexes / Systems of the Male Reproductive and Urinary
From Creeping to Walking	(ERPI); Arnold Gesell; editor: Alice V. Keliher	B&W	10m	October 15, 1934	Yale University of Child Development
Frontier Boy of the Early Midwest	William Deneen; writer: Elmore Leonard	color	16m	February 1, 1962	video
Frontiers in Space	Milan Herzog (producer); I. S. Bowen	color	11m	September 27, 1962	video
Fuels and Heat	(ERPI); H. Horton Sheldon	B&W	10m	December 2, 1938	revised 1946
Fuels: Their Nature and Use	Milan Herzog (producer)	color	11m	June 25, 1958	
Fun on the Playground	Lawrence K. Frank	B&W	11m	November 28, 1947	video
Fundamentals of Acoustics	Warren P. Everote (producer); camera: John Walker	B&W	11m	November 15, 1948	revised 1950; video
Fundamentals of Diet	(ERPI)	B&W	10m	December 28, 1943	video
Fundamentals of Football	(ERPI)	B&W	40m	October 20, 1930	
Fundamentals of the Nervous System	Milan Herzog (producer); James Toman	color	16m	December 8, 1959	
Fundamentals of the Nervous System (2nd edition)	Cheryl Jefferson	color	16m	1981	
Fundamentals of Track and Field	Gerald Heidt	B&W	24m	March 27, 1954	
Fungi	John Walker (producer); Josiah L. Lowe	color	15m	October 11, 1960	revised in 1988 with Scott W. Benton
Fungus Plants	(ERPI); (George) Clyde Fisher	B&W	10m	February 24, 1931	
Fur Trapper of the North	Ralph Bryenton	color	11m	March 15, 1951	
Furnace in the Sky	Bert Van Bork (producer)	color	21m	1983	
Furniture Craftsmen (Meubelmakers)	(ERPI); Edwin Hipkiss	B&W	10m	April 25, 1940	video
Fyodor Dostoyevsky's "The Crocodile"	Larry Yust & Clifton Fadiman; camera: Isidore Mankofsky; cast: Eldon Quick, Robyn Millan, Britt Leach	color	28m	February 26, 1973	Short Story Showcase; second part: A Discussion of...; video

== G ==
Title	Major credits	B&W or color	Running time	Year/copyright date	Notes
A Galactic Encyclopedia	(York Films); Terence Murtagh (producer); writer: David Taylor; narrator: Kerry Frumkin	color	12 shorts (240m total)	1993	
The Galapagos: Darwin's World Within Itself	John Walker (producer); Robert I. Bowman	color	19m	November 10, 1971	Biology program, unit 1: Ecology; video
Galileo's Laws of Falling Bodies	Warren P. Everote (producer); Milan Herzog & O. W. Eshbach	B&W	6m	September 10, 1953	video
The Garbage Explosion	John Walker (producer)	color	16m	April 28, 1970	video
Gardening	(ERPI); Ellen Eddy Shaw	B&W	11m	December 10, 1940	video
Gardens for Everyone	(Education Horizone)	color	11m	1967	
Gas for Home and Industry	Wilbur L. Beauchamp	B&W	20m	October 28, 1949	video
Gas Laws and Their Application: Boyle, Charles and Gay-Lussac	Milan Herzog (producer)	B&W	14m	November 19, 1954	
The Gasoline Age (History of Transportation, Part 2)	Ralph E. Turner	color	14m	December 22, 1958	video
Gazelle	Jane & Peter Chermayeff	color	10m	1984	Silent Safari
Gene Action	David M, Bonner	color	16m	September 30, 1963	
Genetic Fingerprinting	(Science Pictures)	color	20m	1992	
Genetics and Plant Improvements	(Science Pictures); David Spears, Paul Clayton & Madeleine Spears	color	15m	1991	
Geologic Time	Bert Von Bork (producer);	color	22m	1986	
Geological Work of Ice	(ERPI); Carey Croneis	B&W	10m	October 30, 1935	
Geological Work of Ice (2nd edition)	Milan Herzog & John Walker	color	11m	May 13, 1960	
George Washington	(Emerson Film Corp.); Allan Nevins	B&W	18m	January 2, 1951	Famous Men & Women of the World; video
George Washington (2nd edition)	(Osmond Commercial Productions); Kevin Kelly	color	29m	1980	
Germany: People of the Industrial West	John T. Bobbitt (producer); Kenneth Richter	color	16m	September 17, 1957	video
Getting a Job	Hal Kopel (producer); Harry Dexter Kitson	B&W	16m	April 12, 1954	video
Getting Along with Parents	Milan Herzog (producer); Carl R. Rogers	B&W	14m	June 30, 1954	video
Getting the Facts	John T. Bobbitt (producer); Ralph D. Casey	B&W	11m	October 6, 1953	video
Getting the News		color	16m	September 8, 1967	
Geyser Valley (Yellowstone)	Bert Van Bork (producer)	color	8m	1972	video
The Ghost of Captain Peale: Linear Measurement and Mapping with Metric Units	(Davidson Films); Elizabeth Janeway	color	12m	August 12, 1975	Math That Counts
The Gift of the Magi	Bert Van Bork (producer); Jerrold Haisimaier; cast: Janice St. John & Jonathan Fuller	color	15m	1980	video
Giraffe	Jane & Peter Chermayeff	color	11m	1972	Silent Safari; video
Glacier on the Move	Milan Herzog (producer); Richard Kucera	color	11m	May 25, 1973	
Glass: from the Old to the New through Research	Warren P. Everote (producer)	color	20m	January 22, 1954	video
Glasses for Susan: A New Day	Maclovia Rodriquez (producer); Philip Carlin	color	12m	January 10, 1973	
Goats (Billy and Nanny, the Goat Twins)	(ERPI); Ernest Horn	B&W	11m	August 3, 1939	revised 1953; video
The Gold Rush	Stanley Croner & John W. Caughey; camera: Isidore Mankofsky	color	24m	April 20, 1965	
The Golden Axe	(World TV Corp.); William Wilder	B&W	8m	April 8, 1952	video
The Golden Lizard: A Folktale from Mexico	Thomas G. Smith	color	19m	September 26, 1976	video
Goldfinch Family	John Walker (producer); W. W. Bennett	color	8m	June 29, 1956	video
Goya	(Visual Images); David W. Powell & Cherill Anson	color	7m	1973	Art of Awareness (National Gallery of Art)
The Grasslands	Ralph Buchsbaum & Charles E. Olmsted	color	17m	February 21, 1962	Biology program, unit 1: Ecology; video
Gravity: How It Affects Us		color	14m	June 29, 1960	
Gray Gull, the Hunter	(Aktiebolaget Svenski Filmindustri); Arne Sucksdorff	B&W	19m	January 12, 1956	Original film edited from Trut! (1944)
Gray Squirrel	(ERPI); Ernest Horn & Lynwood Chace	B&W	10m	August 4, 1938	
Gray Squirrel (2nd edition)	John Walker (producer); Elizabeth Graf	color	10m	May 2, 1961	
Great Apes: Fact vs. Fantasy	(Avatar Learning); Alan P. Sloan (producer); script: Lawrence M. Konner	color	23m	April 12, 1978	
The Great Books		color	19m	1991	
The Great Debate: Lincoln Versus Douglas	John Barnes & Senator Paul Douglas (producer); Robert K. Sharpe; cast: Hal Holbrook	color	30m	April 9, 1965	
The Great Diamond: Long Division	(Davidson Films); Elizabeth Janeway	color	12m	December 12, 1975	Math That Counts
Great Expectations (The Novel Great Expectations)	John Barnes & Douglas Campbell; writer: Clifton Fadiman; art director: C. Walter Hodges; editor: Robert Johnson	color	2 parts (34m each)	February 21, 1962	videos &
The Great Lakes: How They Were Formed	Harry Grubbs & Clifford J. Kamen; narrator: James Matthews	color	11m	1948	
Great Lakes: North America's Inland Seas	William Kay (producer); Alfred Larsen	color	17m	January 5, 1972	
The Great Lakes: Their Link with Ocean Shipping	Harry Grubbs (producer); Clifford J. Kamen; narrator: James Matthews	color	11m	1948	video
The Great Plains: Land of Risk	Michael Birch (producer)	color	15m	August 18, 1966	
Greek Children	Milan Herzog (producer); L.S. Stavrianos	B&W	16m	February 26, 1951	Children of Many Lands; video
Greek Lyric Poetry	John Barnes; writer: David Grene; art direction: C. Walter Hodges; cast: John Neville, Joe Rae, Mark Dignam & Edwin Richfield	color	30m	September 24, 1962	video
The Greek Myths	John Barnes; co-writer: Gilbert Highet; camera: Mauro Barboni; editor: Robert Johnson	color	2 parts (26m/24m)	December 6, 1971	
Green Plants and Sunlight	George I. Schwartz	color	11m	November 16, 1966	Basic Life Sciences, The World of Green Plants; video
The Grizzly Bear: A Case Study in Field Research'	National Geographic Society -	color	22m	October 23, 1967	video
Ground Water	(ERPI); Corey Croneis	B&W	10m	October 20, 1935	video
Groundwater	Bert Van Bork	color	18m	1982	
Grouping Living Things	Bruce Hoffman	color	20m	1985	
Grouse of the Grasslands	(American Museum of Natural History)	color	10m	August 15, 1950	
Growing	Roach Van Allen	color	8m	August 27, 1969	
Growing Girls	(Film Producers Guild)	B&W	13m	1949	
Growing Up Day By Day	Hugh & Suzanne Johnston	color	10m	February 24, 1959	revised 1980
The Growth of Adaptive Behavior (In the First Five Years)	Arnold Gesell	B&W	11m	November 21, 1946	Yale University of Child Development
Growth of Cities (Cities: How They Grow)	(ERPI); Robert S. Lynd	B&W	11m	December 12, 1941	revised 1952 with producer Milan Herzog; video
The Growth of Infant Behavior: Early Stages	(ERPI); Arnold Gesell; editor: Alice V. Keliher	B&W	10m	October 15, 1934	Yale University of Child Development; video
The Growth of Infant Behavior: Later Stages	(ERPI); Arnold Gesell; editor: Alice V. Keliher	B&W	10m	October 15, 1934	Yale University of Child Development; video
The Growth of Motor Behavior (The First Five Years)	Arnold Gesell	B&W	11m	November 21, 1946	Yale University of Child Development; video
The Growth of Plants	John Walker (producer); Ralph Buchsbaum	color	20m	June 18, 1962	
Growth of Seeds	John Walker (producer); William Morehouse Harlow	color	13m	September 27, 1957	
La Guarda Cuidadosa	(Producciones Ancora Espana); Fernando García de la Vega; cast: Gloria Cámara & Pablo Sanz	color	28m	March 25, 1966	
Guatemala: Nation of Central America	Preston E. James	color	17m	March 1, 1960	video
The Guest	Harry Grubbs (producer); Clifford J. Kamen; narrator: James Matthews	color	11m	1948	
Guidance in Public Schools	(ERPI); Richard D. Allen	B&W	20m	March 28, 1931	
Gymnosperms'	John Walker (producer); Jane Philpott	color	16m	August 1, 1961	Biology program, unit 2: Plant life; video

== H ==
Title	Major credits	B&W or color	Running time	Year/copyright date	Notes
Halloween Party	Gordon Weisenborn (producer); Willard Abraham	color	6m	September 29, 1953	video
Hamlet I: The Age of Elizabeth	(Massachusetts Council for the Humanities); John Barnes & Douglas Campbell; writer: Maynard Mack; art directors: C. Walter Hodges & Brian Jackson; camera: Michael Livesey; editor: Robert Johnson; with Stratford Shakespeare Festival Company	color	30m	1959	video
Hamlet III: The Poisoned Kingdom	(Massachusetts Council for the Humanities); John Barnes & Douglas Campbell; writer: Maynard Mack; art directors: C. Walter Hodges & Brian Jackson; camera: Michael Livesey; editor: Robert Johnson; with Stratford Shakespeare Festival Company	color	30m	1959	
Hamlet IV: The Readiness Is All	(Massachusetts Council for the Humanities); John Barnes & Douglas Campbell; writer: Maynard Mack; art directors: C. Walter Hodges & Brian Jackson; camera: Michael Livesey; editor: Robert Johnson; with Stratford Shakespeare Festival Company	color	30m	1959	video
Hamlet IV: What Happens in Hamlet?	(Massachusetts Council for the Humanities); John Barnes & Douglas Campbell; writer: Maynard Mack; art directors: C. Walter Hodges & Brian Jackson; camera: Michael Livesey; editor: Robert Johnson; with Stratford Shakespeare Festival Company	color	30m	1959	
The Hands	(Crocos Productions); John Barnes; camera: Adam Gifford; cast: Marcel Marceau	color	8m	April 4, 1975	Art of Silence; video
The Hare and the Tortoise	Grace Storm	B&W	11m	October 2, 1947	video
The Hare and the Tortoise	Paul Buchbinder; animation: Richard Pape; camera: Craig Witty; music: Bobbie Thomas	color	9m	1979	animated cartoon
Harlem in the Twenties	Benjamin Quarles & Sterling Stuckey	color	10m	January 7, 1972 (completed '70)	
Hawaii the 50th State	Jean E. Thompson (producer); William Deneen	color	16m	June 11, 1959	video
Hawaii the 50th State (2nd edition)	Jerry Haislmaier	color	24m	1984	
Hawaiian Native Life	(ERPI); [Margaret Mead]	B&W	11m	1940	video
Health in Our Community	Larry Yust & Donald a Dukelow	color	13m	April 17, 1959	video
Hearing the Call	(Open University); John Stratford (producer); consultant: David Robinson; camera: Tim Chard; editor: Ron de Mattos	color	25m	1993	
Heart and Circulation	(ERPI); A. J. Carlson	B&W	10m	June 15, 1937	video
The Heart and the Circulatory System	Charles F. Finance (producer); Forrest H. Adams	color	16m	January 1, 1975	
Heart Care - Your New Lifestyle	writer: Lauraine A. Thomas	color	15m	1981	
Heart Disease: Its Major Causes	Hal Kopel (producer); Wright Adams	B&W	11m	February 23, 1955	video
Heartbeat of a Volcano	Bert Van Bork, Howard Powers & John S. Shelton	color	21m	May 13, 1970	video
Heat and How We Use It	Albert Plitz	color	11m	February 28, 1963	
Heat Series		B&W	series of shorts (30m each)	1957	titles: Change of State / Heat Capacity and Changes of State / Heat Energy and Gas Laws / Heat Engines / Heat Transfer / Latent Heat of Fusion: Laboratory / Liquid Air / Mechanical Equivalent of Heat: Laboratory / Radiant Heat / Refrigeration and Geysers / Thermal Expansion: Laboratory
Heat: Its Nature and Transfer	Milan Herzog (producer); O. W. Eshbach	color	11m	April 15, 1958	video
Heather Becomes a Firefighter	Dennis S. Johnson	color	13m	1980	
The Helicopter	Hal Kopel (producer)	B&W	11m	March 18, 1954	video
Henry Wadsworth Longfellow	(Emerson Film Corp.); Howard M. Jones	B&W	17m	September 27, 1949	Famous Men & Women of the World;
Heredity	(ERPI)	B&W	10m	January 3, 1939	
Heritage in Black		color	27m	May 12, 1969	
Hibernation and Other Forms of Dormancy	Charles C. Carpenter	color	10m	February 20, 1962	
The Hidden World: A Study of Insects	National Geographic Society; Jack Haley Jr.	color	24m	January 11, 1967	edited from a November 8, 1966 broadcast; video
Hindu Family	Milan Herzog (producer); W. Norman Brown	B&W	10m	January 23, 1952	video
Hitting in Baseball	Jimmy Dykes & Hollis Thurston	B&W	11m	February 11, 1947	
Hobo: at the End of the Line	Carl Jones	color	24m	November 22, 1977	video
Home Cookery of Fish		B&W	11m	June 20, 1946	video
Home Electrical Appliances	Earl C. McCracken	B&W	11m	June 7, 1944	video
Home Nursing	(ERPI)	B&W	10m	October 3, 1941	video
The Honey Bee	(ERPI)	B&W	10m	November 15, 1940	video
Horace Mann'	(Emerson Film Corp.); Edwin I. F. Williams	B&W	18m	August 10, 1951	Famous Men & Women of the World; video
The Horse	(ERPI); Ernest Horn	B&W	10m	October 15, 1941	video
Horsemen of the Western Trails		B&W	11m	November 10, 1949	
Horses!	(Avatar Learning); Donna L. denBoer	color	22m	July 11, 1977 (completed '76)	
The Hospital	camera: Isidore Mankofsky	color	13m	November 16, 1966	video
The House-Fly	(ERPI); Melvin Brodshaug & (George) Clyde Fisher	B&W	10m	February 20, 1936	
The House Fly (2nd edition)	Warren P. Everote (producer); Charles E. Palm; camera: William A. Anderson	color	17m	September 18, 1958	video
House of Man, Part I: Our Changing Environment	(Conservation Foundation)	color	17m	1964	
House of Man, Part II: Our Crowded Environment	(Conservation Foundation)	color	11m	June 10, 1969 (completed '66)	
How Behavior Grows: The Patterning of Prone Progression	Arnold Gesell	B&W	11m	February 25, 1947	Yale University of Child Development
How Computers Do It!	David Jay (producer); Bear McKay	color	13m	1985	
How Level Is Sea Level?	(American Geological Institute); Stanley Croner (producer); John S. Shelton; camera: Isidore Mankofsky	color	10m	April 24, 1970	video
How Long Does It Take?	(Centron Corporation); consultants: Carol Elsholz & Jane Polcyn	color	5m	1988	First Things First: Early Literacy Skills
How Nature Protects Animals	(ERPI); (George) Clyde Fisher	B&W	10m	February 24, 1931	
How Nature Protects Animals (2nd edition)	Warren P. Everote (producer); James A. Oliver; camera: William A. Anderson	color	11m	March 30, 1959	revised for video in 1988; video
How Our Bodies Fight Disease	Milan Herzog (producer); Paul R. Cannon	B&W	8m	February 22, 1955	video
How Pine Trees Reproduce: Pine Cone Biology	William Morehouse Harlow	color	11m	November 22, 1963	
How Solid Is Rock?	(American Geological Institute); Stanley Croner (producer); Charles L Finance; camera: Isidore Mankofsky	color	22m	April 16, 1968	video
How The Elephant Got His Trunk	Ed Newman (director); Monica Kenfdalls (co-animator); Chris Weakley, Susan Kubinski, Nancy Guzik, Monica Kendall (set designs)	color	13m	1987	clay animation
How to Bend Light	Larry Yust & Albert V. Baez; camera: Isidore Mankofsky	color	11m	September 29, 1961	
How to Block in Football		B&W	11m	September 8, 1949	
How to Catch (In Baseball)		B&W	11m	February 25, 1948	
How to Communicate Effectively	(Advanced American Communications); Diane Marie Smith (producer); Kevin Hynes; writer: Lisa Rosenberg	color	4 shorts (19-20m each)	1990	titles: Listen Actively / Manage Anger / Practice Delegation / Talk Clearly
How to Conduct a Discussion	Cyril O. Houle	B&W	24m	March 12, 1953	video
How to Handle the Basketball		B&W	11m	October 13, 1949	
How to Handle the Football		B&W	11m	October 5, 1949	
How to Hit (In Baseball)		B&W	11m	February 25, 1948	
How to Improve Your Footwork in Basketball		B&W	11m	October 13, 1949	
How to Make a Simple Loom and Weave	Ruby Day Niebauer	color	16m	January 1, 1955	
How to Make a Starch Painting	Ruby Day Niebauer	color	12m	January 1, 1955	video
How to Measure Time	Larry Yust; camera: Isidore Mankofsky	color	11m	August 15, 1961	video
How to Produce Electric Current with Magnets	Larry Yust & Albert V. Baez; camera: Isidore Mankofsky	color	11m	July 6, 1961	
How to Shoot Baskets		B&W	11m	October 13, 1949	
How to Tackle in Football		B&W	11m	September 8, 1949	
How to Throw (In Baseball)		B&W	11m	February 18, 1948	
Huckleberry Finn and the American Experience	Larry Yust; writer: Clifton Fadiman; camera: Isidore Mankofsky	color	26m	December 16, 1965	
The Human Adventure	(ERPI); Charles Henry Breasted	B&W	8 shorts (edited later as a feature)	April 1, 1934	
Human Biology	(Eothen Films)	color	series of 8mm film loops (4m each)	1971	titles: Joint Movement Introduction / Saddle Joint / Gilding Joints / Ball and Socket Joints / Pivot Joints / Hinge Joints
The Human Brain	John T. Bobbitt (producer); Nathaniel Kleitman	B&W	11m	February 16, 1955	video
The Human Brain (2nd edition)	Bruce Hoffman (producer); William V. Mayer	color	24m	1983	video
Human Development: Enhancing Cognitive Growth in Children	(Concept Media); Al Moore; writer: Janet Dignam	color	3 parts (27-31m each)	1994	titles: Compliance, Self Control and Prosocial Behavior / 2 - Peer Relationships / 3 - Intellectual Growth and Achievement
Human Origins: A Walk through Time	(Open University-BBC); David Jackson (producer)	color	25m	1992	
Human Reproduction	Bruce Hoffman (producer); William V. Mayer, Rita Basuray & Phil McCrea	color	26m	1985	video
Humanities: A Bridge to Ourselves	Milan Herzog (producer); Clifton Fadiman	color	29m	December 10, 1974	video
The Humanities: What They Are and What They Do	(Massachusetts Council for the Humanities); John Barnes & Douglas Campbell; writer: Clifton Fadiman; camera: Michael Livesey; editor: Robert Johnson	color	29m	1959	video
Hungary and Communism: Easter Europe in Change	William Deneen	color	17m	October 8, 1964	
The Hunt	David Deverell (producer); adapted from Richard Connell's The Most Dangerous Game; cast: Mike Lloyd Gentry, Paul St. Michael & Jerry Creamer	color	30m	April 23, 1975	Short Story Showcase; video
The Hunter and the Forest	(Aktiebolaget Svenski Filmindustri); Arne Sucksdorff	B&W	8m	1954	Re-edit of Gryning (1944); video

== I ==
Title	Major credits	B&W or color	Running time	Year/copyright date	Notes
Iberian Peninsula	Harold S. Kemp	B&W	11m	December 31, 1948	video
Ice Cream	H. H. Sommer	B&W	11m	March 17, 1948	video
If You Could See the Earth	Woody Conkling	color	10m	May 3, 1967	revised 1987
Image of the City	Charles and Ray Eames	color	15m	1973	video
Immigration	Henry S. Commager	B&W	11m	January 28, 1947	video
Immobility, Preventing Complications		color	4 shorts (86m total)	1993	
Immunization	Warren P. Everote (producer); Michael Heidelberger, Yale Kneeland Jr. & Harry M. Rose; camera: Andrew Costikyan	B&W	11m	October 17, 1947	video
Immunization (2nd edition)	Michael Heidelberger, Yale Kneeland Jr. & Harry M. Rose	B&W	11m	November 7, 1955	video
The Impact of Television	(Chuck Olin Associates); Chuck Olin	color	20m	1980	video
Impala	Jane & Peter Chermayeff	color	11m	1972	Silent Safari
The Importance of Selling	Hal Kopel (producer); James R. Hawkinson	B&W	19m	October 14, 1952	video
In Case of Fire	Larry Yust	color	20m	November 4, 1959	(black & white copy) video
In Case of Fire (2nd edition)	Dennis Johnson	color	20m	1980	
In Case of Fire Fire Drills and Fire Safety	Lonnie Gilliland	color	20m	1959	
In Eskimo Land		B&W	11m	March 1, 1948	
Increasing Productivity	(National Educational Media)	color	25m	1987	
India, Diverse and Complex Land	Sanjiv Prakash	color	18m	1987	
India: Customs in the Village	F. W. Von Keller & E. S. Von Keller (producers); W. Norman Brown; camera: Jack Cardiff	color	11m	July 26, 1957	re-edit of a 1938 "World Windows" short A Village in India; video
India: Introduction to Its History	F. W. Von Keller & E. S. Von Keller (producers)	color	16m	October 25, 1957	video
India: Pakistan and the Union of India	Milan Herzog (producer); Clarence Woodrow Sorensen	B&W	17m	April 15, 1952	
Indian Art of the Pueblos	Bert Van Bork & Richard Conn	color	13m	March 8, 1976	
Indian Artists of the Southwest	Bert Van Bork (producer); Charles D. Breckenridge	color	15m	1972	
Indian Dances	(American Museum of Natural History)	color	11m	November 14, 1951	
Indian Family of Long Ago: Buffalo Hunters of the Plains		color	14m	February 6, 1957	
Indians of Early America		color	22m	July 9, 1953	video
Individual Differences in Arithmetic	(ERPI); Guy T. Buswell	B&W	20m approx.	February 27, 1931	
Indonesia -New Nation of Asia	William Deneen & Peter Gosling	color	16m	June 4, 1959	video
The Industrial City		color	17m	January 20, 1970	video
Industrial Provinces of Canada		B&W	10m	December 28, 1943	video
Industrial Purchasing (Purchasing Agent)	Warren P. Everote (producer); Lyman White & Howard T. Lewis; camera: Andrew Costikyan	color	22m	July 22, 1952	
The Industrial Revolution	(ERPI)	B&W	10m	October 29, 1942	video
The Industrial Revolution in England'	John Barnes (producer); animation produced by W.M. Larkins	color	25m	August 21, 1959 (completed '57)	black & white video
The Industrial Revolution: The Beginnings in the United States	John Barnes (producer); Dennis Azzarella & Lee Kohns; writer: Linda Gottlieb; cast: Francis Lowell	color	23m	October 11, 1968	video
The Industrial Worker		color	17m	April 5, 1970	
Infants Are Individuals: The Beginnings of Personality	Arnold Gassel	B&W	11m	February 25, 1947	
Inflation	(Twentieth Century Fund); John T. Bobbitt (producer); J. Frederic Dewhurst & Simon N. Whitney	color	20m	February 20, 1953	video
Inland Waterways in the Development of American Transportation	Albert S. Carlson	color	16m	August 9, 1956	video
The Innovator: Producing Powerful Ideas	(Centron Corporation); Robert Kohl (producer); Timothy Rebman; script: John Clifford	color	23m	1988	Handling Creativity
Insect Life Cycle: The Periodical Cicada	Henry S. Dybas (producer); Bert Van Bork	color	11m	January 17, 1957	revised 1975; video
Insect Mouthparts		color	12m	1991	
Insect Parasitism: The Alder Woodwasp and Its Enemies	Ealing Corporation; G. H. Thompson & E. R. Skinner	color	18m	May 21, 1968	
Insect Zoo	Paul Burnford	color	10m	June 3, 1950	video
Insects	Charles E. Palm & William A. Anderson	color	10m	April 1, 1953	video
Insects in a Garden	George I. Schwartz	color	11m	June 3, 1965	Basic life science, unit 2: The world of animals
Insects, the Lovely and the Lethal	(Avatar Learning); Charles L. Hogue	color	23m	1980	video
Inside India		B&W	11m	April 13, 1948	
Inside Russia: Moscow and Leningrad		B&W	11m	April 9, 1948	video
Inside Russia: Peasant Life		B&W	11m	April 13, 1948	
Inside Russia: Siberia		B&W	11m	April 30, 1948	video
Instruments of the Orchestra from Ping to Bong	Wayne Boyer	color	11m	1988	
Insurance Against Fire Losses		color	13m	January 10, 1952	
The Interior West: The Land Nobody Wanted	Clarence Olmstead; camera: Arthur Botham	color	20m	November 21, 1966	
Intern: A Long Year	John Barnes (producer); Karin Mack; camera: Michael Livesey; editor: Robert Johnson	color	10m	March 14, 1973	video
Introduction to Biology	Warren P. Everote (producer); R.O. Freeland	B&W	14m	June 2, 1952	video
Introduction to Holography	Thomas G. Smith (producer); Tung H. Jeong & Albert V. Baez	color	17m	May 5, 1972 (completed '71)	video
Introduction to the Cathode-Ray Oscilloscope	Thomas G. Smith (producer);	color	11m	November 5, 1970	video
Introduction to the Laser	Thomas G. Smith (producer); Charles Townes, Arthur Schawlow & Ali Javan	color	18m	March 5, 1973	
Introduction to the Water Cycle	Bert Van Bork; narrator: Kerry Frumkin	color	12m	1988	
Investigating Hibernation: The Golden-mantled Ground Squirrel	Thomas G. Smith (producer); Eric T. Pengelley & Sally Asmundsen	color	14m	1972	video
Iran: Between Two Worlds	Kenneth Richter	color	14m	March 4, 1954	video
Irish Boy: The Story of Sean		color	15m	June 2, 1972	video
Irish Children: Rural Life in Western Ireland (Children of Ireland)	Milan Herzog (producer); Conrad M. Arensberg	B&W	11m	March 29, 1948	Children of Many Lands; video
Irrigation Farming	(ERPI); George T. Renner Jr.	B&W	10m	August 3, 1939	revised 1950; video
Is the Ice Age Coming?	(Beid-Covan Productions)	color	24m	March 14, 1977	
Israeli Boy: Life on a Kibbutz	Writer/producer/director Ruth Ariella Broyde	color	17m	March 4, 1973	video
Italian Children: Harvest Time in Umbria	Joseph G. Fucilla	B&W	11m	May 31, 1950	Children of Many Lands; video
An Italian Family: Life in a Farm	John Barnes (producer); Edoardo Capolino	color	21m	June 2, 1975	also known as "Farm Family In Italy"; video
Italy, Peninsula of Contrasts	Clifford J. Kamen (producer); Clarence W. Sorensen	color	17m	May 9, 1952	video
It's a Badger's World!	Hugh & Suzanne Johnston (producers); Barbara Wehr	color	12m	1980	

== J ==
Title	Major credits	B&W or color	Running time	Year/copyright date	Notes
James Dickey, Poet: Lord, Let Me Die, But Not Die Out	Stanley Croner	color	37m	July 23, 1970	video
James Fenimore Cooper	(Emerson Film Corp.); E. Spiller	B&W	17m	September 27, 1949	Famous Men & Women of the World
Jamestown: The First English Settlement in America	Milan Herzog (producer); Bert Van Bork & Clarence L. Ver Steeg	color	22m	May 1, 1958	video
Jan: Boy of the Netherlands	Milan Herzog (producer); Irving Rusinow	color	19m	September 29, 1970	
Japan: 80,000,000 Mouths to Feed'	Dickson Reck	color	12m	January 22, 1953	
Japan: Economic World Power	(Trigon Film for Institut for Film und Bild); Brigitte Krause; consultant: Dr. Albert J. Larson	color	15m	1992	
Japan: Harvesting the Land and Sea	William Deneen & Robert Hall	color	27m	September 30, 1963	
Japan: Miracle in Asia	William Deneen	color	30m	September 16, 1963	video
Japanese Boy, the Story of Taro	William Deneen	color	20m	February 4, 1963	video
Je Parle Français Deuxième Degré	(Concept Films)	color	approx 10 shorts (10m each)	1970	
Je Parle Français Premier Degré: Deuxième Édition	Edward F. "Frank" Wilgocki Jr. (producer); Michel Beaudry, Michel Boyer, Jean Goumain & Jean Leduc	color	approx 20 shorts (10m each)	1974	
Je Parle Français: Art and Life (L'Art Et La Vie)	(Concept Films)	color	9m	1970	
Je Parle Français: Aux Quatre Coins de France	(Concept Films)	color	9m	1970	
Je Parle Français: Loin de Paris	(Concept Films)	color	9m	1970	
Je Parle Français: Loisirs Et Vacances	(Concept Films)	color	9m	1970	
Je Parle Français: Manual 1 (episodes 1-27)	(Tadié-Cinema); Milan Herzog, LaVelle Rosselot & Georges Matoré (producer); Georges Strouvé & Jacques Duhamel	bw & c-series of shorts (10m each)	1960	First 13 titles: L'École Américane #1 / Permettez Moi #2 / Je M'appelle #3 / Ma Soeur Anne #4 / Ou Allez-Vous? #5 / Qu'est-ce que Vous Étudiez? #6 / Pouvez-vous Me Dire... #7 / Anne a L'université De Rennes #8 / Etes-vous Étudiante? #9 / Parlez-vous Anglais? #10 / Un Café d'Étudiants #11 / Le 9 Octobre #12 / Je Ne Sais #13	
Je Parle Français: Manual 2 (episodes 28-66)	(Tadié-Cinema); Milan Herzog, LaVelle Rosselot & Georges Matoré (producer); Georges Strouvé & Jacques Duhamel	bw & c-series of shorts (10m each)	1961		
Je Parle Français: Manual 2 Episode 51: L'Abbaye	(Tadié-Cinema); Milan Herzog, LaVelle Rosselot & Georges Matoré (producer); Georges Strouvé & Jacques Duhamel	color	7m	1961	video
Je Parle Français: Manual 2 Episode 52: Le Mont Saint-Michel	(Tadié-Cinema); Milan Herzog, LaVelle Rosselot & Georges Matoré (producer); Georges Strouvé & Jacques Duhamel	B&W	7m	1961	video
Je Parle Français: Manual 2 Episode 64: Le Pardon	(Tadié-Cinema); Milan Herzog, LaVelle Rosselot & Georges Matoré (producer); Georges Strouvé & Jacques Duhamel	B&W	7m	1961	video
Je Parle Français: Manual 2 Episode 65: Fête Folklorique	(Tadié-Cinema); Milan Herzog, LaVelle Rosselot & Georges Matoré (producer); Georges Strouvé & Jacques Duhamel	B&W	7m	1961	video
Je Parle Français: Manual 2 Episode 66: Les Menhirs	(Tadié-Cinema); Milan Herzog, LaVelle Rosselot & Georges Matoré (producer); Georges Strouvé & Jacques Duhamel	color	7m	1961	video
Je Parle Français: Manual 3 (episodes 67-81)	(Tadié-Cinema); Milan Herzog, LaVelle Rosselot & Georges Matoré (producer); Georges Strouvé & Jacques Duhamel	bw & c-series of shorts (10m each)	1961		
Je Parle Français: Manual 3 Episode 67: Chaumont	(Tadié-Cinema); Milan Herzog, LaVelle Rosselot & Georges Matoré (producer); Georges Strouvé & Jacques Duhamel	B&W	7m	1961	video
Je Parle Français: Manual 3 Episode 81: Le Tour Eiffel	(Tadié-Cinema); Milan Herzog, LaVelle Rosselot & Georges Matoré (producer); Georges Strouvé & Jacques Duhamel	B&W	7m	1961	video
Je Parle Français: Manual 4 (episodes 82-120)	(Tadié-Cinema); Milan Herzog, LaVelle Rosselot & Georges Matoré (producer); Georges Strouvé & Jacques Duhamel	bw & c-series of shorts (10m each)	1961		
Je Parle Français: Manual 4 Episode 114: La Ferm	(Tadié-Cinema); Milan Herzog, LaVelle Rosselot & Georges Matoré (producer); Georges Strouvé & Jacques Duhamel	color	7m	1961	video
Je Parle Français: Manual 4 Episode 117: Le Camping	(Tadié-Cinema); Milan Herzog, LaVelle Rosselot & Georges Matoré (producer); Georges Strouvé & Jacques Duhamel	color	7m	1961	video
Je Parle Français: Manual 4 Episode 119: Carcassonne	(Tadié-Cinema); Milan Herzog, LaVelle Rosselot & Georges Matoré (producer); Georges Strouvé & Jacques Duhamel	B&W	7m	1961	video
Je Parle Français: Manual 4 Episode 84: Le Palais De Versailles	(Tadié-Cinema); Milan Herzog, LaVelle Rosselot & Georges Matoré (producer); Georges Strouvé & Jacques Duhamel	B&W	7m	1961	video
Je Parle Français: Manual 4 Episode 85: Les Jardin De Versailles	(Tadié-Cinema); Milan Herzog, LaVelle Rosselot & Georges Matoré (producer); Georges Strouvé & Jacques Duhamel	B&W	7m	1961	video
Je Parle Français: Quebec La Belle Province	(Concept Films)	color	9m	1970	
Je Parle Français: Rhythmes de Paris	(Concept Films)	color	9m	1970	video
Je Parle Français: Une Lettre de Suisse	(Concept Films)	color	9m	1970	
Je Parle Français: Vivre Mieux, Demain	(Concept Films)	color	9m	1970	video
Jean and Her Dolls	John Barnes & Gordon Weisenborn	color	5m	October 2, 1952	video
Jerry's Restaurant	(H.S. Potter Productions); Jerry Myers	color	12m	June 26, 1977	
Jerusalem, the Holy City	F. W. Von Keller & E. S. Von Keller (producers); Casper J. Kraemer Jr.; camera: Jack Cardiff	color	10m	March 2, 1951	re-edit of a 1938 "World Windows" short Jerusalem; video
Jesse from Mississippi	Benjamin Quarles & Sterling Stuckey	color	15m	November 10, 1971	
Jet Propulsion	(Emerson Film Corp.)	B&W	11m	November 24, 1952	video
Job Opportunities		color	series of 8mm film loops (5m each)	1969	titles: Carpenters / Fire Fighters
Job Opportunities (2nd series)		color	series of 8mm film loops (5m each)	1970	titles: Air Conditioning and Refrigeration Mechanics / Airplane Mechanists / All-round Machinists / Automobile Body Repairmen / Automobile Mechanics / Bricklayers / Carpenters / Cooks and Chefs / Dental Assistants / Dental Hygienists / Dental Laboratory Technicians / Electricians / Forestry Aides / Licensed Practical Nurses / Medical Technologists / Photographers / Registered Professional Nurses / Routemen / Sheet Metal Workers / Surveyors / Television and Radio Service Tehnicians / Waiters and Waitresses / Welders Oxygen and Arc Cutters
John C. Calhoun	(Emerson Film Corp.); Avery O. Craven	B&W	17m	December 29, 1950	Famous Men & Women of the World
John Charles Fremont	(Emerson Film Corp.); Allan Nevins	B&W	17m	June 7, 1950	Famous Men & Women of the World; video
John Greenleaf Whittier	(Emerson Film Corp.); Cecil B. Williams	B&W	17m	June 7, 1950	Famous Men & Women of the World; video
John Keats	John Barnes; co-writer: Archibald MacLeish; art director: Bernard Sarron; camera: Alfred Hicks; narrator: James Mason; cast: John Stride, Janine Faye, Richard Everett, Petra Davis, Ezra Barnes, Frank Barrie & Mark Dignam	color	2 shorts adapted from a feature (20m each)	August 20, 1973	titles: Poet / His Life and His Death; video
Joseph Mallord William Turner, R.A.	(Visual Images); David W. Powell & Cherill Anson	color	8m	1974	Art of Awareness (National Gallery of Art)
John Marshall'	(Emerson Film Corp.); Edwin S. Corwin	B&W	18m	December 29, 1950	Famous Men & Women of the World
John Quincy Adams'	(Emerson Film Corp.); Dexter Perkins	B&W	17m	January 2, 1951	Famous Men & Women of the World
John Singleton Copley	(Visual Images); David W. Powell & Cherill Anson	color	7m	1974	Art of Awareness (National Gallery of Art)
Johnny from Fort Apache	Maclovia Rodrigues & Tony Machukay	color	15m	July 28, 1971	
The Joint-Legged Animals: Anthropods	John Walker (producer); Ralph Buchsbaum	color	18m	June 18, 1962	Biology program, unit 3: Animal life; video
Joy of Growing - Germs and the Space Visitors	Warren Brown, Glenn Langer, Donald Kincaid & H. G. LaBranche	color	7m	October 27, 1971	
Joy of Growing - Health: Eye Care Fantasy	Warren Brown, Glenn Langer, Donald Kincaid & H. G. LaBranche	color	7m	March 5, 1972	
Joy of Growing - Safety: Playground Spirits	Warren Brown, Glenn Langer, Donald Kincaid & H. G. LaBranche	color	7m	March 20, 1972	video
Joy of Growing - Safety: The Helpful Burglars	Warren Brown, Glenn Langer, Donald Kincaid & H. G. LaBranche	color	7m	October 27, 1971	
Joy of Growing - the Dirt Witch Cleans Up	Warren Brown, Glenn Langer, Donald Kincaid & H. G. LaBranche	color	7m	November 10, 1971	video
Joy of Growing - the Traffic Jungle	Warren Brown, Glenn Langer, Donald Kincaid & H. G. LaBranche	color	7m	October 25, 1971	
Joy of Growing - Toothache of the Clown	Milan Herzog (producer); Warren Brown, Glenn Langer, Donald Kincaid & H. G. LaBranche	color	7m	January 24, 1972	video
Julius Caesar: The Rise of the Roman Empire	William Deneen & John Eadie; writer: Elmore Leanord	color	22m	April 24, 1964	
Jumps and Pole Vault	(ERPI); Lawson Robertson	B&W	10m	May 17, 1938	video
Jungles: The Green Oceans	(Avatar Learning)	color	23m	1980	
Junior Rodeo Daredevils		B&W	9m	October 5, 1949	video
Justice under Law: The Gideon Case	John Barnes (producer); Isidore Stein & Christopher Young	color	23m	December 21, 1966	video

== K ==
Title	Major credits	B&W or color	Running time	Year/copyright date	Notes
Kangaroos	(Australian Instructional Films); Lex Halliday	B&W	10m	Aug 26, 1952	
Keeping Clean and Neat	Hal Kopel (producer); J. Wendell Yeo (collaboration); narrator: James Brill	color	11m	August 9, 1956	video
Keeping Your Teeth Healthy	(Charles Cahill & Associates); Barbara Wehr	color	8m	1981	video
Kentucky Pioneers	(ERPI); T. D. Clark	B&W	11m	August 13, 1941	video
Kentucky Pioneers (2nd edition)	Thomas G. Smith & Allan Eckert	color	26m	March 13, 1969 (completed '67)	video
King Vat: Introduction to Decimals	(Davidson Films); Elizabeth Janeway	color	12m	December 29, 1975	Math That Counts
Kitchen Safety	(National Educational Media); Diane Marie Smith (producer); Bill Sheridan; writer: Don Hall; host: Tom Bosley	color	5 shorts (15m each)	1989	titles: Preventing Burns / Preventing Cuts / Preventing Falls / Preventing Fires / Preventing Machine Injuries
Kitchen Sanitation: Fighting Foodborne Illnesses	(National Educational Media); Diane Marie Smith (producer); Bill Sheridan; writer: Don Hall; host: Tom Bosley	color	20m	1989	
Kitchen Sanitation: In Your Hands	(National Educational Media); Diane Marie Smith (producer); Bill Sheridan; writer: Don Hall; host: Tom Bosley	color	14m	1989	

== L ==
Title	Major credits	B&W or color	Running time	Year/copyright date	Notes
The Lady of Shalott	A.J.H. Pullinger (producer); Clarence W. Hach	color	10m	April 12, 1971	
The Lady, or the Tiger?	Larry Yust (producer); Clifton Fadiman; camera: Isidore Mankofsky; cast: Ivan Triesault, Tammie Mavroleon, Philip Chapin, Sandra Descher & Phil Goble	color	16m	December 23, 1969	Short Story Showcase; second part: A Discussion Of Frank Stockton's The Lady Or The Tiger?; video
Lafayette: Soldier of Liberty		B&W	16m	August 18, 1955	
Lake Constance: Jewel of Central Europe		color	15m	1992	
Lambing'	(Royal Norwegian Ministry of Agriculture); John Walker (producer)	B&W	20m	1967	
Land of Friendly Animals (of the Galapagos Islands)	John Walker (producer); Robert Bowman	color	11m	May 1, 1972	
Land of Mexico	(ERPI); Wallace Walter Atwood	B&W	10m	March 6, 1939	video
The Language of Maps	Nadine I. Clark	color	11m	May 5, 1964	video
Laplanders	(Aktiebolaget Svenski Filmindustri); Arne Sucksdorff	B&W	8m	February 14, 1952	Original film edited from Vinden Från Väster (1942); video
Latitude and Longitude	(British Columbia Provincial Educational Media Centre)	color	14m	1981	
Laws of Heredity	Curt Stern	color	15m	April 2, 1963	
Laws of Motion	Milan Herzog (producer); O. W. Eshbach	color	13m	October 23, 1952	
The Leader: Encouraging Team Creativity	(Centron Corporation); Robert Kohl (producer); Timothy Rebman; script: John Clifford	color	23m	1988	Handling Creativity
Learning About Bears	John Walker (producer)	color	11m	August 16, 1960	
Learning About Cells	Howard Potter & Craig Witty (producers); Henson Swift	color	16m	May 5, 1976	
Learning About Deer	(Bath-Film)	color	10m	1981	
Learning About Electric Current	Thomas G. Smith (producer); Albert V. Baez	color	8m	October 5, 1955	video
Learning About Electric Current (2nd edition)	Thomas G. Smith (producer); Albert V. Baez	color	15m	September 18, 1974	
Learning About Flowers	John Walker (producer); Walter Thurber	color	14m	August 2, 1957	
Learning About Heat	Thomas G. Smith (producer); Albert V. Baez	color	8m	July 22, 1955	video
Learning About Heat (2nd edition)	Thomas G. Smith (producer)	color	15m	September 17, 1974	video
Learning About Leaves	John Walker (producer); Walter Thurber	color	11m	August 29, 1958	video
Learning About Light	Thomas G. Smith (producer)	color	8m	July 14, 1955	video
Learning About Light (2nd edition)	Thomas G. Smith (producer)	color	14m	April 29, 1976	video
Learning About Magnetism	Thomas G. Smith (producer)	color	10m	1976	
Learning About Nuclear Energy	Thomas G. Smith (producer); Albert V. Baez	color	10m	April 18, 1975	
Learning About Seeds		color	11m	September 14, 1960	video
Learning About Sound	Thomas G. Smith (producer)	color	8m	February 23, 1955	video
Learning About Sound	Thomas G. Smith (producer); Albert V. Baez	color	17m	1974	
Learning About Sound (2nd edition)	Thomas G. Smith (producer)	color	16m	July 3, 1976 (completed '75)	video
Learning About Stroke	Henry B. Betts, Arthur Dale Ericsson & Howard G. Thistle	color	19m	1982	
Learning About Your Nose	Milan Herzog (producer); John Jacob Ballenger	color	9m	January 16, 1956	
Learning and Growth	(ERPI); Arnold Gesell	B&W	11m	February 4, 1935	Yale University of Child Development
Learning To Read Maps (2nd Edition)	David A. Jay (producer); Mime: Carol Hanpeter	color	12m	1980	
Learning to Study	John T. Bobbitt (producer); Harold A. Anderson	B&W	14m	June 15, 1954	video
Learning to Use Your Senses	Robert Deem	color	10m	July 23, 1968	
Learning with Today's Media	Irving Rusinow	color	35m	January 28, 1974	
Leaves	(ERPI); Melvin Brodshaug & (George) Clyde Fisher	B&W	10m	February 20, 1936	revised 1947
Lee Baltimore - 99 Years	(Odyssey Productions); Steve Heiser	color	16m	April 30, 1976	
The Legend of the Magic Knives	Bert Van Bork; sculptor: Tony Hunt	color	11m	January 21, 1971	video
Lemonade Stand: What's Fair?	Thomas G. Smith (producer); Barbara Wehr; camera: Isidore Mankofsky	color	13m	January 8, 1970	
Leonardo da Vinci: Giant of the Renaissance	John Barnes; camera: Michael Livesley; narrator: Michael Goodliff	color	25m	March 21, 1957	video
A Lesson in Courage on Washington's Birthday		color	6m	November 23, 1953	
Let Them Learn	(Bell & Howell Co.)	color	27m	February 27, 1967	
Let's Do: Bang!	Roach Van Allen	color	6m	May 12, 1969	Magic Moments Unit 2; video
Let's Do: Clap!	Roach Van Allen	color	6m	May 12, 1969	Magic Moments Unit 2; video
Let's Do: Follow Me	Roach Van Allen	color	6m	May 12, 1969	Magic Moments Unit 2; video
Let's Do: Magic Hands	Roach Van Allen	color	6m	May 12, 1969	Magic Moments Unit 2; video
Let's Go to the Circus	Milan Herzog (producer)	B&W	11m	November 10, 1949	video
Let's Play: Guessing Game	Roach Van Allen	color	6m	May 12, 1969	Magic Moments Unit 5; video
Let's Play: Matching Up	Roach Van Allen	color	6m	May 9, 1969	Magic Moments Unit 5; video
Let's Play: Choosing Up	Roach Van Allen	color	6m	November 11, 1969	Magic Moments Unit 5; video
Let's Play: Join Hands, Let Go!	Roach Van Allen	color	7m	May 9, 1969	Magic Moments Unit 5; video
Let's Pretend: Getting Along	Roach Van Allen	color	2m	October 31, 1969	Magic Moments Unit 4; video
Let's Pretend: Getting Even	Roach Van Allen	color	4m	1969	Magic Moments Unit 4; video
Let's Pretend: Holding On	Roach Van Allen	color	15m	October 31, 1969	Magic Moments Unit 4; video
Let's Pretend: Magic Sneakers	Roach Van Allen	color	8m	May 12, 1969	Magic Moments Unit 4; video
Let's See: Fantasy of Feet	Roach Van Allen	color	7m	May 9, 1969	Magic Moments Unit 3; video
Let's See: Hands Grow Up	Roach Van Allen	color	7m	May 9, 1969	Magic Moments Unit 3; video
Let's See: Lopsideland	Roach Van Allen	color	5m	October 31, 1969	Magic Moments Unit 3; video
Let's See: Toes Tell	Roach Van Allen	color	6m	October 31, 1969	Magic Moments Unit 3; video
Let's Talk: Me Too?	Roach Van Allen	color	5m	October 31, 1969	Magic Moments Unit 1; video
Let's Talk: What If?	Roach Van Allen	color	5m	October 31, 1969	Magic Moments Unit 1; video
Let's Talk: What's Happening?	Roach Van Allen	color	5m	1969	Magic Moments Unit 1; video
Let's Talk: Whose Shoes?	Roach Van Allen	color	5m	October 31, 1969	Magic Moments Unit 1; video
Letters A-Z	(Centron Corporation); consultants: Carol Elsholz & Jane Polcyn	color	6m	1988	First Things First: Early Literacy Skills
Lewis and Clark	(Emerson Film Corp.); Dan E. Clark	B&W	17m	June 7, 1950	Famous Men & Women of the World; video
Liberty under Law: The Schempp Case, Bible Reading in Public Schools (Freedom of Religion)	John Barnes (producer); Dennis Azzarella; camera: Isidore Mankofsky	color	35m	October 29, 1969	
Libraries and the Pursuit for Happiness'	Cheryl Jefferson (producer)	color	29m	1981	
A Library Is a Place Where		color	17m	September 16, 1963	
Library of Congress		color	23m	February 14, 1969	
Library Story	Milan Herzog (producer); Margaret I. Rufsvald	color	14m	May 22, 1952	video
The Library: A Place for Discovery	Irving Rusinow (producer)	color	16m	April 25, 1966	video
Life Along the Waterways	Roy C. Wilcox (producer); G. E. Hutchinson & John A. Haeseler	color	11m	May 5, 1952 (completed '50)	video
Life Between Tides (Life in a Tide Pool)	Bert Van Bork (producer); Ralph Buchsbaum & Margaret McKibben Lawler; camera: Isidore Mankofsky	color	11m	August 30, 1963	Basic life science series, unit 5: Plant and animal relationships
Life in a Vacant Lot	Bert Van Bork, Albert B. Carr & John Wagner	color	10m	July 4, 1966	Basic life science series, unit 5: Plant and animal relationships
Life in Ancient Rome	William Deneen & John Eadie; writer: Elmore Leonard	color	14m	July 9, 1964	
Life in Old Louisiana	(ERPI)	B&W	10m	December 26, 1941	video
Life in the Desert: American Southwest'	(Allied Film Artists); Franz J. Camenzind (producer); Ron Casden; sound: Linda Casden	color	11m	April 28, 1978	
Life in the Desert: North America	Warren P. Everote (producer); William A. Anderson & Raymond B. Cowles	color	11m	June 15, 1954	video
Life in the Forest: North America	Warren P. Everote (producer); William A. Anderson & Orlando Park	color	11m	January 31, 1955	
Life in the Grasslands	(Allied Film Artists); Franz J. Caaenzind (producer); script: Bob Casden	color	11m	February 15, 1978	
Life in the Grasslands: North America	Warren P. Everote (producer); William A. Anderson	color	11m	September 20, 1954	video
Life in the Sahara	Clifford J. Kamen (producer); Clarence W. Sorensen	color	14m	April 16, 1953	video
Life in the Sea		B&W	11m	April 7, 1958	video
Life of a Plant	Warren P. Everote (producer); R.O. Freeland; camera: John Ott	color	11m	1959	video
The life of the Honeybee		color	24m	1980	video
Life Story of a Moth, the Silkworm		color	16m	June 9, 1964	Basic Life Sciences, unit 1 Animals without Backbones
Life Story of a Snake	John Walker (producer); Margaret McKibben Lawler & Robert F. Inger	color	11m	January 15, 1964	Basic Life Sciences, unit 2 Animals with Backbones
Life Story of a Social Insect: The Ant	John Walker (producer); Christopher J Sanders	color	11m	January 24, 1968	Basic Life Sciences, unit 1 Animals without Backbones
Life Story of a Water Flea, Daphnia	Bert Van Bork	color	10m	January 25, 1966	Basic Life Sciences, unit 1 Animals without Backbones; video
Life Story of the Crayfish	John Walker (producer)	color	10m	August 27, 1962	Basic Life Sciences, unit 1 Animals without Backbones; video
Life Story of the Earthworm	John Walker (producer)	color	16m	September 16, 1961	Basic Life Sciences, unit 1 Animals without Backbones
Life Story of the Grasshopper	John T. Bobbitt (producer); Edwin C. Udey	color	11m	November 21, 1966	Basic Life Sciences, unit 1 Animals without Backbones
Life Story of the Hummingbird	Emmet R. Blake & Margaret McKibben Lawler	color	16m	May 15, 1961	Basic Life Sciences, unit 2 Animals with Backbones; video
Life Story of the Ladybird Beetle	George I. Schwartz & John Wagner; camera: Isidore Mankofsky	color	10m	February 10, 1966	Basic Life Sciences, unit 1 Animals without Backbones
Life Story of the Oyster	Bert Van Bork (producer); Ralph Buchsbaum & Margaret McKibben Lawler	color	11m	September 12, 1963	Basic Life Sciences, unit 1 Animals without Backbones
Life Story of the Paramecium	Bert Van Bork, Robert Hull & Margaret McKibben Lawler	color	11m	July 26, 1965, revised 1989	Basic Life Sciences, unit 1 Animals without Backbones; video
Life Story of the Red-Winged Blackbird	John Walker (producer); Margaret McKibben Lawler & Owen J. Grome	color	11m	January 20, 1964	Basic Life Sciences, unit 2 Animals with Backbones
Life Story of the Sea Star	Bert Van Bork (producer); Ralph Buchsbaum & Margaret McKibben Lawler; camera: Isidore Mankofsky	color	11m	October 20, 1963	Basic Life Sciences, unit 1 Animals without Backbones; edit from it released in 1968 for 8mm as "Sand Dollar"
Life Story of the Snail	John Walker (producer); Robert Hull & Margaret McKibben Lawler	color	11m	March 28, 1965	Basic Life Sciences, unit 1 Animals without Backbones
Life Story of the Toad	John Walker (producer)	color	11m	September 26, 1961	Basic Life Sciences, unit 2, Animals with Backbones; video
Life: How Do We Define It?	Bert Van Bork	color	15m	1987	video
Light and Color	Larry Yust & Albert V. Baez; camera: Isidore Mankofsky	color	13m	September 5, 1961	
Light and Dark	Paul Burnford	color	6m	August 18, 1954	Art in Action; video
Light and What It Does	Alexander B. Costea	color	11m	September 30, 1962	video
Light Science: You Can Do It	Philip Stockton (producer); Scott W. Benton	color	13m	1986	
Light Waves and Their Uses	(ERPI); H. Horton Sheldon	B&W	10m	February 15, 1938	video
The Lighthouse	(New Horizon); Cynthia Chapman, Hal Albert & Wilbur T. Blume	color	11m	May 28, 1952	video
Like You, Like Me	(Avatar Learning); Alan P. Sloan (producer); Kate Jackson (host)	color	series of 6m shorts	October 26, 1977	part animated cartoon titles: Everyone Needs Some Help / I Can Do It / It's Up to Me / Let Me Try / Let's Be Friends / Let's Talk It Over / When I Grow Up / Why Me?
Linda and Billy Ray from Appalachia	Robert Hoover	color	15m	March 31, 1970	Newcomers to the City
Line	Paul Burnford	color	6m	August 18, 1954	Art in Action; video
Lines in Relief, Woodcut and Block Printing'	Bert Van Bork & Harold Joachim	color	11m	July 6, 1964	
Lintola: Addition with Carrying	(Davidson Films); Elizabeth Janeway	color	12m	November 11, 1975	Math That Counts
Lion	Jane & Peter Chermayeff	color	11m	1971	Silent Safari; video
The Lion and the Mouse	David Alexovitch; script: Jeff Osier; camera: Mike Westphal	color	12m	1988	animated cartoon
The Little Black Lamb	Hal Kopel (producer); Paul A. Witty	B&W	11m	September 28, 1955	video
Live Teddy Bears: The Koala		B&W	11m	October 17, 1947	video
Living & Non-living Things	Scott W. Benton (producer); Maria Finitzo	color	16m	1987	
The Living Cell: An Introduction (The Living Cell DNA)	Craig Witty (producer); Hewson Swift	color	20m	August 28, 1974	
The Living City	(Twentieth Century Fund); John Barnes; camera: Haskell Wexler, Andy Costikian, Louis Clyde Stoumen; narrator: James Brill	B&W	23m	November 25, 1953 (filmed '52)	Academy Award for Best Documentary (Short Subject) nominee; video
Living Things Are Everywhere	Bert Van Bork	color	11m	December 31, 1963	Basic Life Science, unit 1 What Are Living Things?
Living Things in a Drop of Water	Bert Van Bork & George I. Schwartz	color	11m	November 25, 1965	Basic Life Science, The World of Living Things
Living with Stress	(Milner-Fenwick)	color	15m	1981	
Living with Tourettes	(Open University); Rissa de la Paz (producer); consultant: Sarah Bullock	color	24m	1993	
Lobbying: A Case Study (Pressure Groups)		color	18m	August 24, 1977	
The Long Christmas Dinner, by Thornton Wilder	Larry Yust & Clifton Fadiman; cast: Barbara Boles, Hope Summers & Andy Robinson	color	37m	January 5, 1976	Short Play Showcase; video
Long Division	Maurice L. Hartung	B&W	11m	February 26, 1947	
Look in the Answer Book	(Jack Spear Productions); Philip Carlin	color	10m	January 17, 1973 (completed '71)	
Look to the Land	(Twentieth Century Fund); John Barnes & Robert W. Hartley; camera: Haskell Wexler & Louis Clyde Stoumen & Gordon Weisenborn	color	11m	March 18, 1954	video
Looking at Amphibians	John Walker (producer); Bert Van Bork, W. E. Dickinson & Margaret McKibben Lawler	color	11m	November 13, 1964	Basic life science, unit 2: The world of animals
Looking at Birds	John Walker (producer); Margaret McKibben Lawler & Owen J. Gromme	color	10m	April 16, 1964	Basic life science, unit 2: The world of animals
Looking at Mammals	Thomas G. Smith & John Wagner; camera: Isidore Mankofsky	color	11m	March 22, 1967	Basic life science, unit 2: The world of animals
Looking at Reptiles	John Walker (producer); W. E. Dickinson & Margaret McKibben Lawler	color	11m	February 2, 1965	Basic life science, unit 2: The world of animals
Los Habladores	(Producciones Ancora Espana); Milan Herzog (producer); Fernando García de la Vega; cast: Alfonso del Real, Enrique Echevarrira, Blas Martin, Mary Paz Pondal	color	17m	March 3, 1966	
A Lost World		B&W	11m-	March 1, 1948	edit of The Lost World (1925 film); video
The Lottery	Larry Yust & Clifton Fadiman; writer: Shirley Jackson; camera: Isidore Mankofsky; editor: Alpert Nalpas; cast: Olive Dunbar, William "Billy" Benedict, Willim Fawcett, Joe Haworth & Ed Begley Jr.	color	18m	October 13, 1969	Short Story Showcase; second part: A Discussion of...; video
Louisa May Alcott	(Emerson Film Corp.); Madeleine B. Stern	B&W	17m	June 7, 1950	Famous Men & Women of the World
Louisiana Purchase: Key to a Continent	Hal Kopel (producer); Ray Allen Billington	B&W	16m	July 14, 1955	video
The Louisiana Purchase: Moving West of the Mississippi'	(Advanced American Communications); Robert C. Peters & B. Don Greene (producer); Glenn & Karen Winters	color	16m	1990	
Lucy Covington, Native American Indian	(Odyssey Productions); Steve Heiser	color	16m	March 1, 1978	
Lumber for Houses	(Viking Pictures)	B&W	12m	November 5, 1952	
The Lungs and the Respiratory System	Charles F. Finance & Bertrand J. Shapiro	color	17m	April 22, 1975	

== M ==
Title	Major credits	B&W or color	Running time	Year/copyright date	Notes
Macbeth, Part I: The Politics of Power	John Barnes & Douglas Campbell; art direction: Ben Creme; camera: Joseph Ambor; editor: Charles Hasse; cast: William Squire, Gudrun Ure, Michael Gwynn, Duncan Lamont & George Hagen	color	28m	July 3, 1964	video
Macbeth, Part II: The Themes of Macbeth	John Barnes & Douglas Campbell; art direction: Ben Creme; camera: Joseph Ambor; editor: Charles Hasse; cast: William Squire, Gudrun Ure, Michael Gwynn, Duncan Lamont & George Hagen	color	28m	July 31, 1964	video
Macbeth, Part III: The Secret'st Man	John Barnes & Douglas Campbell; art direction: Ben Creme; camera: Joseph Ambor; editor: Charles Hasse; cast: William Squire, Gudrun Ure, Michael Gwynn, Duncan Lamont & George Hagen	color	33m	August 19, 1964	video
The Machine Maker	(ERPI); Frank C. Hockema	B&W	10m	November 21, 1939	revised 1953
Maestros De La Pintura	John W. Uller	color	9m	October 4, 1965	video
Magic Prison: The Poetry of Emily Dickinson	John Barnes; co-writer: Archibald MacLeish; camera: Isidore Mankofsky; editor: Paul Stein; music: Ezra Laderman & English Chamber Orchestra; narrator: James Mason; cast: Frances Sternhagen & Michael Higgins	color	36m	February 21, 1969	video
The Magic Rectangle - Short Multiplication	(Davidson Films); Elizabeth Janeway	color	12m	January 15, 1976	Math That Counts
The Magic Shop	Bert Van Bork & Clifton Fadiman; writer: Jerrold Haislmaier; cast: Robert Schneiderman, Bob Weiss & Ralph Freda	color	12m	1980	
Magna Carta, Part 1	John Barnes & Lacey Baldwin Smith; co-writer: James Sage	color	16m	February 9, 1959	video
Magna Carta, Part 2	John Barnes & Lacey Baldwin Smith; co-writer: James Sage	color	16m	March 16, 1959	video
Magnetic, Electric, and Gravitational Fields	Larry Yust & Albert V. Baez; camera: Isidore Mankofsky	color	11m	September 5, 1961	
Magnetism'	(Guild Holdings Ltd.)	B&W	16m	December 16, 1953	video
Magnets: The Dragon's Secret		color	14m	1981	part animated cartoon; video
Mahatma Gandhi	(American Academy of Asian Studies)	color	19m	July 7, 1955	video
The Mailman	Milan Herzog (producer); Paul Robert Hanna	B&W	11m	January 10, 1947	video
The Mailman (2nd edition)	Lorraine D. Peterson; camera: Isidore Mankofsky	color	11m	June 30, 1964	
Mainstreaming in Action	(Togg Films); Grania Gurievitch & Ellen Barnes	color	15m	1979	
The Majestic Eagles of North America	Scott W. Benton (producer); Barbara Wehr	color	12m	1985	
Major Goals in Gastrointestinal Emergency Care	Charles F. Finance	color	30m approx.	1980	
Major Religions of the World: Development and Rituals	Wilhelm Pauck & Warren P. Everote (producer); writer: Wallace Purcell	B&W	20m	November 4, 1953	video
Make Buying Pleasant	(ERPI)	B&W	10m	January 28, 1931	
Making Books	Milan Herzog (producer); Luther H. Evans	B&W	11m	November 17, 1947	video
Making Bricks for Houses	R. K. Kursh & John Walker	B&W	11m	December 12, 1947	
Making Cotton Clothing	Isabel B. Wingate	B&W	11m	August 5, 1946	video
Making Electricity	Warren P. Everote (producer); S. Ralph Poers	B&W	11m	June 2, 1949 (filmed '48)	video
Making Films That Teach	Hal Kopel (producer)	part c-19m	November 5, 1954	video	
Making Friends	Hal Kopel (producer); Rose H. Alschuler	color	11m	December 9, 1953	revised 1975; video
Making Glass for Houses	Warren P. Everote (producer); F. V. Tooley; camera: Andrew Costikyan	B&W	11m	March 17, 1948	video
Making Haiku	Larry Klingman & Anette Klingman	color	8m	February 25, 1972	
Making Meetings Work: A Five Step Plan	(Chuck Olin Associates); Chuck Olin & Larry Hall	color	18m	1983	
The Making of a Mural	Thomas Hart Benton	color	11m	July 3, 1947	video
Making Shoes	J. Stanley McIntosh	B&W	11m	January 28, 1947	video
Making the Desert Green	Warren Brown; camera: Isidore Mankofsky	color	16m	November 28, 1966	
Making the Things We Need (Division of Labor)		color	14m	August 20, 1969	
Making Things Move		color	11m	September 21, 1952	
Making Work Easier		color	10m	1963	video
Making Work Faster		color	10m	April 11, 1963	
Making Yourself Understood: Introduction to Communication		color	14m	November 18, 1953	video
Malaya, Land of Tin and Rubber	Milan Herzog (producer); William Deneen & Clarence W. Sorensen	color	14m	September 4, 1957	
Malcolm Brewer, Boat Builder	(Odyssey Productions)	color	16m	April 30, 1976	
Mammals Are Interesting	Paul Burnford - Harold Davis	color	12m	May 28, 1953	video
Man and His Culture	Hal Kopel (producer); Robert Redfield	B&W	15m	June 21, 1954	video
Man Looks at the Moon		color	15m	March 4, 1971	
Managing a Drug Free Work Environment	(National Educational Media); Michael Grant Hall; writer: Anthony L. Kramer; cast: Irving Margol	color	13m	1987	
Managing Low Back Pain	writer: Lauraine A. Thomas	color	16m	1981	
Managing People Problems	(Centron Corporation); Robert Kohl (producer)	color	3 shorts (14-15m each)	1987	titles: Are You Really Listening? / Dealing with Different Personalities / Motivating Employees: Trapped on a Plateau
Man's Basic Need: Natural Resources		color	11m	April 1, 1969	
Man's Problem	(Conservation Foundation); George Brewer & John C. Gibbs (producer); John H. Storer	color	19m	March 16, 1953	Living Water Series
Manuel from Puerto Rico	Barbara Blourock & Antonia Pantoja; camera: Isidore Mankofsky	color	14m	December 10, 1968	
Maps for a Changing World (The Airplane Changes Our World)	John Walker (producer); Larry Yust & George T. Renner; camera: Isidore Mankofsky	color	11m	January 7, 1960	video
Maps for a Changing World (2nd edition)	David Jay (producer)	color	18m	1980	
Marco Polo's Travels		B&W	19m	May 6, 1955	video
The Marine Biologist	Bert Van Bork	color	14m	August 30, 1963	video
Marine Invertebrates		color	23m	1990	
Marine Life	F. W. Von Keller & E. S. Von Keller	color	11m	April 1, 1953	
Maritime Provinces of Canada		B&W	10m	December 28, 1943	video
The Marsh Community	John Walker (producer); Orlando Park	color	11m	May 3, 1966	Basic life science series, unit 5: Plant and animal relationships
Martin Luther King Jr.	Benjamin Quarles & Sterling Stuckey	color	10m	January 10, 1972	
Martin Luther King Jr.	(Chuck Olin Associates); Gordon Quinn & Alan Facemire	color	24m	1982	Great Americans; video
The Maskmaker	(Crocos Productions); John Barnes; camera: Adam Gifford; cast: Marcel Marceau	color	8m	April 9, 1975	Art of Silence; video
Master Weavers of the Andes	Peter Pilafian	color	14m	1977	video
Mathsense	David Wood & Scott Shearer; consultant: Mary M. Lindquist	color	5 shorts (18m each)	1991	titles: Addition and Subtraction Work Together / How Decimals Work / How Fractions Work / How Numbers Work / Multiplication and Division Work Together
The Mayfly: Ecology of An Aquatic Insect	Bert Van Bork & Calvin R. Fremling	color	15m	July 6, 1973	
The Mayor	camera: Isidore Mankofsky	color	13m	October 5, 1966	video
Meaning in Modern Painting	John Barnes & Roy MacMullin (producer); Louis Clyde Stoumen	color	2 shorts (23m/17m)	June 2, 1967	video
The Meaning of Long Division	Milan Herzog (producer); Maurice L. Hartung	B&W	11m	December 12, 1947	
The Meaning of Plus and Minus	Milan Herzog (producer); George E. Russell, Maurice L. Haunting, Henry Van Engen, Catherine Mahoney & Lois Knowles	color	10m	June 25, 1953	
The Meaning of Time in Science	Milan Herzog (producer); Kent Smith; assist: Albert V. Baez, Dennis Piernick, James B. Gerhart, Buzz Aldrin, Vladimir Weinstein & Robert Cowles	color	26m	1973	video
Meat - from Range to Market: Production, Processing, and Distribution	Robert Longini (producer); John T. Nickelson	B&W	11m	September 21, 1955	video
Mechanics Series	Quentin Brown; camera: Abraham Morochnik	B&W	2 parts (30m/33m)	1964	titles: Secondary Flow / Waves in Fluids; video
Mechanics Series: Vorticity (The Bathtub Vortex)	Ascher H. Shapiro	B&W	40m	December 1961	
The Mechanisms of Breathing	(ERPI)	B&W	10m	December 8, 1936	
The Mechanisms of Breathing (2nd edition)	Victor Johnson	B&W	10m	1954	video
Medical Effects of Alcohol	(Milner-Fenwick)	color	15m	1984	
The Medieval Crusades	Milan Herzog (producer); Kenneth M. Setton	color	27m	April 25, 1956	video (black & white copy)
The Medieval Guilds	Milan Herzog (producer); David K Bjork	color	21m	March 7, 1956	
The Medieval Knights	Milan Herzog (producer); Sidney Painter	color	22m	March 9, 1956	video
The Medieval Manor	Milan Herzog (producer); George C. Homans	color	21m	April 18, 1956	video (black & white copy)
The Medieval Mind	John Barnes & Linda Gottlieb; camera: Mauro Barboni; editor: Robert Johnson	color	26m	September 7, 1969	video
Mediterranean Africa	Clifford J. Kamen (producer); Clarence W. Sorensen	color	11m	December 31, 1952	
The Mediterranean World	Clifford J. Kamen (producer)	color	22m	December 19, 1961	
Meeting the World	Lawrence K. Frank	B&W	11m	October 18, 1946	
Megalopolis- Cradle of the Future	Jean Gottmann	color	22m	May 16, 1962	
Meiosis and Mitosis		color	12m	1991	
Meiosis: Sex Cell Formation	John Walker (producer); Eliot B. Spies, Ralph Buchsbaum & Theodore N. Tahmisian	color	16m	March 7, 1963	revised 1980
Mental Health: Keeping Mentally Fit	Hal Kopel (producer); David Slight	color	12m	October 23, 1952	video
Mesa Verde: Mystery of the Silent Cities	Bert Van Bork (producer); Gilbert Wenger	color	14m	December 19, 1975	video
Message from a Dinosaur	John Walker (producer); George I. Schwartz	color	11m	November 25, 1965	Basic life science series, The Stream of Life
Metal Craft	(ERPI); Forest Grant	B&W	10m	June 14, 1939	
Metal Hand Tools	(Eothen Films)	color	series of 8mm film loops (4m each)	1971	titles: The Cold Chisels / The Drill (Drills) / The Drill Press
Metamorphosis: Life Story of the Wasp	advisor: Margaret McKibben Lawler	color	14m	October 2, 1963	Introduction to Biology; video
Meteors, Meteorites, Meteoroids	Robert L. McDonell, advisor: Dave Smith; artists: Arlene Skarani, Anthony A. Morse & Gloriana Gill	color	15m	1979	
Mexican Boy: The Story of Pablo	William Deneen; Carol Connor Amescua & Arnold Zweerts	color	22m	January 17, 1961	video
Mexican Children	(ERPI); Ernest Horn	B&W	10m	December 2, 1938	Children of Many Lands; video
The Mexican-American Speaks. Heritage in Bronze	Norman Foster & Milan Herzog (producer); Armando Morales	color	20m	August 4, 1972	
Mexico: The Land and the People (Life in Mexico)	Roger Brown	color	24m	1986	
Mexico: The Land and the People (People of Mexico)	William Deneen & Preston E. James	color	20m	September 5, 1961	video
Michael Discovers the Magnet		B&W	11m	June 22, 1955	video
Michelangelo	John Barnes & Joseph Ambor; editor: Charles Hasse; narrator: Michael Gwynn	color	30m	Apr 28, 1965	video
Microscopic Life: The World of the Invisible	Ann Matzner	color	14m	May 1, 1958	(black & white version) video
The Middle East		B&W	14m	November 29, 1954	video
The Middle States	(ERPI)	B&W	11m	December 31, 1942	revised 1956; video
The Middle States (2nd edition)	Carl Dudley (producer)	color	11m	October 9, 1956	video
The Midnight Ride of Paul Revere	Warren P. Everote (producer); Allan Nevins	color	11m	July 9, 1957	video
Midwest, Heartland of the Nation'	Thomas G. Smith & Charles M Davis	color	25m	November 1, 1968	video
Migration of Birds - the Canada Goose	John Walker (producer); Helen D. MacCracken	color	11m	November 18, 1959	
Mike and Steve Visit the Shopping Center		color	14m	September 5, 1969	
Milk		B&W	11m	March 4, 1946	revised 1956; video
Milk: from Farm to You	Thomas G. Smith (producer); Mary Hartzell	color	27m	December 29, 1972	
Milk, from Farm to You (2nd edition)	Paul Buchbinder (producer); Gaylon Emerzion	color	15m	1987	
Minerals and Rocks: Stones of the Earth	Milan Herzog (producer); John Sampson White	color	16m	September 4, 1957	
Minerals and Rocks (2nd edition)	Bert Van Bork & John Sampson White; writer: Woody Conkling	color	15m	1979	video
Miss Goodall and the Wild Chimpanzees	National Geographic Society	color	28m	December 10, 1965	video
A Miserable Merry Christmas		color	15m	1974	video
Mississippi System: Waterway of Commerce	(A.D.M. Films); Charles F. Gritzner	color	16m	April 28, 1970	
Mitosis: Animal and Plant	Eliot B. Spiess	color	23m	October 24, 1961	revised 1980
The Modern Lithographer	(ERPI)	B&W	10m	April 25, 1940	video
Molecular Theory of Matter		B&W	11m	June 7, 1946	
Molecular Theory of Matter (2nd edition)	(Crawley Films); Margaret Nicholson	color	11m	November 11, 1965	
Mollusk: Snails, Mussels, Octopuses, and Their Relatives		B&W	14m	May 2, 1955	
Mollusks, Mechanisms and Mind		color	24m	1990	
Monarch Butterfly Story	(Andre Film Features); Warren P. Everote (producer); William Andrew Anderson	color	11m	February 8, 1951	video
Monarch Butterfly Story (2nd edition)	John Walker	color	16m	October 12, 1967	video
Monarch Butterfly Story (3rd edition)	Scott W. Benton	color	9m	1987	video
Money and Its Uses		color	11m	August 16, 1962	
Money in the Marketplace	(Howard Potter Prod.); Michael A. MacDowell	color	15m	December 1976	
Money Money Money	(Howard Potter Prod.); Michael A. MacDowell	color	15m	December 1976	
The Monkey and the Organ Grinder	Stanley Croner	color	10m	Feb 19, 1971	
The Monkey Who Would Be King	Warren P. Everote & John Walker (producer); Ruth O. Bradley; camera: Lynwood Chase	color	11m	May 22, 1957	
Monuments to Erosion	Bert Van Bork	color	11m	July 10, 1974	
The Moon	(ERPI); Walter Bartky	B&W	10m	November 15, 1936	video
The Moon- a Giant Step in Geology	(Media-Four); Charles F. Finance & Elbert A. King	color	24m	July 21, 1975	video
The Morning Star	(Francis R. Line	color	36m	1951	video
The Mosquito	E. Laurence Palmer	B&W	11m	November 28, 1947	video
The Mosquito: A Bite for Survival	(Milner-Fenwick); C. Patey & Brian Laurence	color	29m	1984	video
The Most Important Person	(Sutherland Learning Associates); Philip Carlin	color	series of shorts	April 3, 1972	animated cartoon distributed by EB on 16mm
Mother Cat and Her Baby Skunks	Milan Herzog (producer); Ruth O. Bradley	color	11m	May 26, 1958 (black & white version)	video
Mother Deer and Her Twins	John Walker (producer); William James Hamilton	color	10m	February 17, 1959	
Mother Rabbit's Family	Helen M. Robinson	color	11m	January 16, 1957	video
Moths	(ERPI); (George) Clyde Fisher	B&W	10m	October 1, 1931	
Motorcycle Safety: Sharing the Road	Thomas G. Smith (producer); Allen Robinson & Richard Van Cott	color	14m	October 6, 1977	
Mount Wilson Observatory: Jupiter, Saturn and Mars in Motion	Karl G. Henzie; camera: Isidore Mankofsky	color	10m	1960	video
Mountain Building	(ERPI); Corey Croneis	B&W	10m	October 30, 1935	video
Movement Everywhere	Roach Van Allen	color	11m	January 9, 1970	
Mrs. and Mr. Peacock	C. George Chaput	color	10m	January 1, 1956	video
Much Ado About Nut Things - Problem Solving: Estimation	(Aesop Films Inc.-National Semiconductor Corp.)	color	13m	January 26, 1977	
Muscle: Chemistry of Contraction	Charles F. Finance & Wilfred Mommerts	color	15m	September 24, 1969	Biology program, Unit 4: Physiology; video
Muscle: Dynamics of Contraction	Charles F. Finance & Wilfred Mommerts	color	21m	October 16, 1969	Biology program, unit 4: Physiology; video
Muscle: Electrical Activity of Contraction	Charles F. Finance & Wilfred Mommerts	color	9m	October 29, 1969	Biology program, unit 4: Physiology; video
Muscles, Their Structure and Function	Dennis S. Johnson	color	25m	1986	
My Old Man (Ernest Hemingway's "My Old Man")	Larry Yust & Clifton Fadiman; camera: Isidore Mankofsky; cast includes Chad Courtney & Chad States	color	36m	January 28, 1970	Short Story Showcase; second part: A Discussion of...; video

== N ==
Title	Major credits	B&W or color	Running time	Year/copyright date	Notes
Nate the Great and the Sticky Case	Paul Buchbinder; camera: Ned Miller; music: Michelle Linsner; cast: Jason Wasserman, Bob Fox & Meg Colleton	color	19m	1985	
A Nation of Painters	(Visual Images); David W. Powell	color	7m	1973	Art of Awareness (National Gallery of Art)
Nationalism	John T. Bobbitt (producer); Hans Kohn	B&W	20m	October 29, 1952	American Democracy; video
Native American Myths	(Reid-Cowan Productions-Avatar Learning Inc.); Alfonso Ortiz, Stephen S. Jones, Hazel John, Frank Collison, Barbara Bravo & Mary Lou Byler	color	24m	July 15, 1977 (completed '76)	video
Natural Selection	Ralph Buchsbaum, Richard W. Holm & Paul Ehrlich	color	16m	October 22, 1963	
Nature's Plan	(Conservation Foundation); George Brewer & John C. Gibbs (producers); John H. Storer	color	14m	March 16, 1953	Living Water Series; video
Navajo Children (Tasco the Navajo)	(ERPI); Ernest Horn	B&W	10m	June 22, 1938	Children of Many Lands; video
Navajo Indians	(ERPI); Clark Wissler & John Walker	B&W	10m	March 6, 1939	video
Neighborhoods Are Different		color	11m	June 3, 1963	
Neighborhoods Are Different (2nd edition)	Bruce Hoffman	color	12m	1987	
Nematode	Cary Lu & Richard Russell	color	11m	May 11, 1973	
The Nerve Impulse	Charles F. Finance	color	22m	February 1, 1971	Biology program, unit 4: Physiology
The Nervous System	(ERPI); Ralph W. Gerard	B&W	10m	June 15, 1937	video
The Nervous System (3rd edition)		color	17m	1981	video
The Netherlands: Blueprint for An Urban Society	Milan Herzog	color	16m	October 21, 1971	
New England Fisherman	(ERPI); Wallace Walter Atwood	B&W	10m	October 10, 1938	revised 1946; video
New England Fisherman	Clarence W. Sorensen	color	11m	December 22, 1967	
New England Town 1660, Call of the Frontier	Clarence L. Ver Steeg	color	18m	April 16, 1969	
The New Telephone Manners	(National Educational Media)	color	11m	1986	
Newspaper Story	Kenneth E. Olson	B&W	20m	August 10, 1950	video
Newspaper Story (2nd edition)	Thomas G. Smith & Louis Starr; camera: Isidore Mankofsky	color	30m	July 19, 1973 (completed '72)	video
The Night Before Christmas	Milan Herzog (producer); music: Theodore A. Varges	color	11m	May 19, 1955	
The Night Sky	Hermann D. Tauchert	color	11m	February 5, 1969	
The Nightingale's Tale	(Omega Productions); Donald Fox	color	13m	April 16, 1971	animated cartoon
The Nile Crocodile	Dick Reucassel; narrator: Hugh Rouse	color	27m	1982	
The Nile Valley and Its People	William Deneen	color	19m	September 21, 1962	
No Law Without Lawyers	Sue Marx & Pamela Conn	color	22m	1985	
Noise: Polluting the Environment	Thomas G. Smith (producer); Vern O. Knudson	color	15m	May 6, 1971	
The Northeast, Gateway for a Nation		color	11m	March 3, 1967	
The Northeast, Headquarters for a Nation	John Barnes (producer)	color	22m	March 3, 1967	
The Northeastern States	(ERPI); Howard W. Odum	B&W	10m	December 31, 1942	
The Northeastern States (2nd edition)	Carl Dudley (producer); Howard W. Odum (adviser)	color	11m	November 16, 1956	black & white video
The Northwestern States	(ERPI); Howard W. Odum	B&W	11m	December 31, 1942	video
The Northwestern States (2nd edition)	Carl Dudley (producer); Howard W. Odum (adviser)	color	11m	May 18, 1956	black & white video
Norwegian Children: Farming on a Fiord		B&W	11m	February 21, 1950	Children of Many Lands; video
The Nose: Structure and Function	Milan Herzog (producer); John J. Ballenger	color	11m	June 3, 1954	video
The Novel: What It Is, What It's About, What It Does	John Barnes (producer); Clifton Fadiman; camera: Michael Livesey; cast: John Stride, Judi Dench, Mark Dignam & Michael Gwynn	color	34m	March 8, 1962	
Nuclear Theory and Energy	David Jay (producer); Albert V. Crewe & Robert Deem	color	20m	1985	video
The Number System	Milan Herzog (producer); George E. Russell, Maurice L. Haunting, Henry Van Engen, Catherine Mahoney & Lois Knowles	color	10m	May 28, 1953	video
Numerals Everywhere	Roach Van Allen	color	9m	January 16, 1969	
Numbers 1-10	(Centron Corporation); consultants: Carol Elsholz & Jane Polcyn	color	6m	1988	First Things First: Early Literacy Skills
The Nurse	Warren P. Everote (producer); Hamilton McFadden & Elizabeth S. Bixler	B&W	11m	October 28, 1949	video
Nutrician for Better Health	(Milner-Fenwick)	color	15m	1984	

== O ==
Title	Major credits	B&W or color	Running time	Year/copyright date	Notes
Oasis	Arvin William Hahn	color	11m	May 27, 1965	
Obesity: Problems of Fat Formation and Overweight	Milan Herzog (producer); John B. Youmans	B&W	12m	October 28, 1952	video
The Occult: Mysteries of the Supernatural'	(Avatar Learning); Alan P. Sloan (producer); LaMar T. Empey	color	23m	February 10, 1978	
Ocean Dynamics: The Work of the Sea	Bert Van Bork	color	23m	1981	
Ocean Tides: Bay of Fundy		B&W	14m	1956	
Ocean Voyage	John Barnes; camera: Michael Livesey	B&W	13m	May 19, 1955	video
Odyssey II: The Return of Odysseus	John Barnes; writer: Gilbert Highet; art direction: Brian Jackson & Geogio Oddi; camera: Aldo Tonti; cast: Simon Lack, Ann Morrish, Dyson Lovell & Michael Gwynn	color	26m	November 4, 1965	video
Odyssey III: The Central Themes	John Barnes; writer: Gilbert Highet; art direction: Brian Jackson & Geogio Oddi; camera: Aldo Tonti; cast: Simon Lack, Ann Morrish, Dyson Lovell & Michael Gwynn	color	18m	November 4, 1965	video
Odyssey: Structure of the Epic	John Barnes; writer: Gilbert Highet; art direction: Brian Jackson & Geogio Oddi; camera: Aldo Tonti; cast: Simon Lack, Ann Morrish, Dyson Lovell & Michael Gwynn	color	27m	January 25, 1966	video
Oedipus Rex II: The Character of Oedipus	John Barnes & Michael Roemer (producers); Douglas Campbell; co-writer: Bernard Knox; co-editor: Robert Johnson; art direction: C. Walter Hodges; camera: Micheal Livesey; with Stratford Shakespearean Festival of Canada	color	30m	1959	video
Oedipus Rex III: Man and God	John Barnes & Michael Roemer (producers); Douglas Campbell; co-writer: Bernard Knox; co-editor: Robert Johnson; art direction: C. Walter Hodges; camera: Micheal Livesey; with Stratford Shakespearean Festival of Canada	color	30m	1959	
Oedipus Rex IV: The Recovery of Oedipus	John Barnes & Michael Roemer (producers); Douglas Campbell; co-writer: Bernard Knox; co-editor: Robert Johnson; art direction: C. Walter Hodges; camera: Micheal Livesey; with Stratford Shakespearean Festival of Canada	color	30m	1959	video
Oedipus Rex: Age of Sophocles	John Barnes & Michael Roemer (producers); Douglas Campbell; co-writer: Bernard Knox; co-editor: Robert Johnson; art direction: C. Walter Hodges; camera: Micheal Livesey; with Stratford Shakespearean Festival of Canada	color	30m	1959	video
Of All the Nerves	Bruce Hoffman	color	22m	1983	
Office Courtesy: Meeting the Public	Hamden L. Forkner	B&W	11m	July 17, 1953	video
Office Etiquette	Hamden L. Forkner	B&W	13m	May 25, 1950	video
Office Teamwork		B&W	11m	July 17, 1952	video
Old Truths in New Garments	(ERPI)	B&W	30m	December 1, 1931	
Oliver Wendell Holmes	(Emerson Film Corp.)	B&W	17m	June 7, 1950	Famous Men & Women of the World; video
Only Benjy Knows: Should He Tell? '.		color	4m	June 18, 1970	
Orange Grower	Warren Brown (producer); writer: Neal Rubin	color	17m	February 7, 1958	
The Orange Grower	(ERPI); Edwin R. Parker	B&W	10m	October 3, 1939	
The Oregon Trail	John Barnes & Mildred Miles Main; editor: Carmen di Belieff	B&W	25m	May 31, 1956	
Organizing Discussion Groups (How to Organize a Discussion Group)		B&W	21m	March 12, 1953	
Oriental Brushwork	Eliot O'Hara	color	16m	June 19, 1954	video
Origin of Land Plants: Liverworts and Mosses'	John Walker (producer); Ralph Buchsbaum	color	13m	January 16, 1963	
The Origin of Life: Chemical Evolution	Bert Van Bork & Cyril Ponnamperuma	color	12m	August 20, 1969	
Osmosis	(A. S. Crafts)	color	16m	December 12, 1958	
Ostrich	Jane & Peter Chermayeff	color	10m	1984	Silent Safari
Our American Native Friends	(Behrens Company); Bob Behrens	color	10m	1970	
Our Changing Cities: Can They Be Saved?	William Kay (producer); Leon Stover	color	16m	February 7, 1973	
Our Changing Way of Life: The Dairy Farmer	Bert Van Bork	color	17m	May 13, 1965	video
Our Changing Way of Life: The Lumberman	Bert Van Bork	color	15m	April 9, 1965	
Our Community	Milan Herzog (producer); Paul Robert Hanna	B&W	11m	April 23, 1952	video
Our Community Services		color	12m	October 1, 1969	
Our Earth	(ERPI); Wallace Walter Atwood	B&W	10m	January 1, 1938	
Our Friends in Historic Cities	(Behrens Company); Bob Behrens	color	7m	1970	
Our Friends on Farms and Ranches	(Behrens Company); Bob Behrens	color	10m	1970	
Our Hispano-American Friends	(Behrens Company); Bob Behrens	color	10m	1970	
Our Living Shield	Bruce Hoffman	color	22m	1984	
Our Post Office		color	10m	August 15, 1965	video
Our Post Office (A Letter to a Football Hero)	Edward A. Krug	color	11m	August 15, 1956	revised 1977
Our Soil Resources	Warren P. Everote (producer); Firman E. Bear	B&W	11m	December 8, 1947	video
Our Town and Our Universe	(Massachusetts Council for the Humanities); John Barnes & Douglas Campbell; writer: Clifton Fadiman; camera: Michael Livesey; editor: Robert Johnson	color	29m	1959	video
Our Town and Ourselves	(Massachusetts Council for the Humanities); John Barnes & Douglas Campbell; writer: Clifton Fadiman; camera: Michael Livesey; editor: Robert Johnson	color	29m	1959	video
Our Vanishing Marshland	Dennis S. Johnson	color	22m	1983	
Our Weather	Nicholas Dancy (producer); George G. Mallinson	B&W	11m	August 12, 1955	video
Our World of Science	George G. Mallinson	B&W	10m	November 16, 1956	video
Overcoming Limitations of Learning	(ERPI)	B&W	10m	June 20, 1936	

== P ==
Title	Major credits	B&W or color	Running time	Year/copyright date	Notes
Pacific Canada	(ERPI)	B&W	10m	December 16, 1943	video
The Pacific: Discovery and Development	(British Council)	color	11m	October 13, 1950	video
The Pacific West		color	24m	March 18, 1969	
The Painter	(Crocos Productions); John Barnes; camera: Adam Gifford; cast: Marcel Marceau	color	8m	April 8, 1975	Art of Silence; video
Painting An Abstraction: Using Planes	Eliot O'Hara	color	11m	June 15, 1950 (completed '49)	video
Painting Clouds with Eliot O'Hara	Eliot O'Hara	color	22m	March 20, 1955	
Painting Reflections in Water	Eliot O'Hara	color	11m	June 2, 1947	
Painting Shadows	Eliot O'Hara	color	10m	1957	video
Painting Trees with Eliot O'Hara	Eliot O'Hara	color	16m	January 22, 1954	video
Painting with Sand- a Navajo Ceremony	(Viking Pictures);	color	11m	February 6, 1950	
Pakistan	Milan Herzog (producer); Clarence W. Sorensen	color	14m	January 31, 1955	video
Pamela Wong's Birthday for Grandma	(Lifestyle Productions); Pamela Wong; cast: Pamela Eng	color	8m	January 6, 1977	
The Panama Canal: Gateway to the World	Milan Herzog (producer); Gene Feldman	color	14m	July 5, 1961 (completed '60)	
Pandas: A Gift from China	Thomas G. Smith (producer)	color	16m	June 10, 1974	
Pantomime: Language of the Heart	(Crocos Productions); John Barnes; camera: Adam Gifford; cast: Marcel Marceau	color	9m	March 26, 1975	Art of Silence; video
Paper	C. E. Libby	B&W	11m	September 6, 1946	video
Parasitism (Parasitic Flatworms) '	Bert Van Bork (producer); Ralph Buchsbaum & Robert W. Hull	color	17m	March 5, 1963	Biology program, unit 3: Animal life
Parental Roles: Don and Mae	Greg Heimer (producer); Rose M. Somerville	color	29m	August 15, 1973	
Parts of Our Body	(Centron Corporation); consultants: Carol Elsholz & Jane Polcyn	color	5m	1988	First Things First: Early Literacy Skills
La Parure (Guy de Maupassant's "The Necklace")	Bert Van Bork (producer); Jerrold Haislmaier; cast: Jill Shellebarger, Roger Mueller, Linda Kimbrough & Les Podewell	color	22m	1980	Short Story Showcase
The Passenger Train	(ERPI); Ernest Horn	B&W	11m	August 29, 1940	video
The Passenger Train (2nd edition)	Milan Herzog (producer); Ernest Horn	B&W	11m	February 8, 1955	video
Pat Explores His City		color	14m	March 17, 1971	video
Pathfinding in the Brain: A Fish & Bird's Eye View	(Open University); Rissa de la Paz (producer); consultant: Vicky Stirling; camera: Manford Mueller	color	25m	1993	
Paul Bunyan		color	11m	1970	
People Along the Mississippi	John Barnes & Gordon Weisenborn (producer); Clarence W. Sorensen	B&W	21m	February 21, 1952	video
People of a City	(Aktiebolaget Svenski Filmindustri); Arne Sucksdorff	B&W	18m	July 9, 1957	Reissue of Symphony of a City; video
People of Greece	Clifford J. Kamen (producer)	color	14m	May 19, 1955	
People of Hawaii	(ERPI); Margaret Mead	B&W	10m	December 17, 1940	video
People of Mexico	(ERPI); Wallace Walter Atwood	B&W	10m	March 6, 1939	video
People of Spain	Milan Herzog & Clifford J. Kamen (producer)	color	16m	May 10, 1955	video
People of the Congo	(ERPI); James P. Chapin; camera: Attilio Gatti	B&W	10m	July 6, 1939	video
People of the Netherlands	Milan Herzog (producer); Kenneth Richter	color	16m	September 11, 1957	
People of the Reindeer: The Wind from the West	(Svensk filmindustri); Clifford J. Kamen (producer); Arne Sucksdorff	color	18m	January 12, 1956	Original film edited from Vinden Från Väster (1942)
People of Western China	(ERPI); O. J. Caldwell; camera: Amos Burg	B&W	11m	December 26, 1940	video
The People Places	David & William Kay	color	22m	1983	
People You'd Like to Know: C. J.	Dr. Francis Partridge Connor	color	20m	1978	
People You'd Like to Know: Dee	Dr. Francis Partridge Connor	color	20m	1978	
People You'd Like to Know: Diana	Dr. Francis Partridge Connor	color	20m	1978	
People You'd Like to Know: Elizabeth	Dr. Francis Partridge Connor	color	20m	1978	
People You'd Like to Know: Harold	Dr. Francis Partridge Connor	color	20m	1978	
People You'd Like to Know: Introduction	Dr. Francis Partridge Connor	color	20m	1978	
People You'd Like to Know: John	Dr. Francis Partridge Connor	color	20m	1978	
People You'd Like to Know: Kai	Dr. Francis Partridge Connor	color	20m	1978	
People You'd Like to Know: Mark	Dr. Francis Partridge Connor	color	20m	1978	
People You'd Like to Know: Mary	Dr. Francis Partridge Connor	color	20m	1978	
People You'd Like to Know: Paige	Dr. Francis Partridge Connor	color	20m	1978	
The Percussion Group	(ERPI); James Brill, revised with Peter W. Dykema	B&W	10m	December 19, 1930	revised 1938
The Percussion Group (2nd edition)	Milan Herzog (producer); Ralph E. Rush; music: Hans Swarowsky & Vienna Symphony	color	11m	October 9, 1956	
Personality and Emotions	Milan Herzog (producer); J. McVicker Hunt	B&W	13m	January 24, 1955	video
Personality Development Series: Emergence of Personality	Lawrence K. Frank	B&W	11m	December 13, 1948	
Personality Development Series: Emergence of Personality; Baby Meets His Parents	Lawrence K. Frank	B&W	11m	December 13, 1948	video
Personality Development Series: Helping the Child to Accept the Do's	Lawrence K. Frank	B&W	11m	December 13, 1948	video
Personality Development Series: Helping the Child to Face the Don'ts	Lawrence K. Frank	B&W	11m	December 13, 1948	
Perspective Management: What We Learn from the Japanese	P. Alexander Gibney (producer); Irving Saraf	color	28m	1984	
Peru: People of the Andes	Preston E. James	color	16m	May 4, 1959	video
Peru: People of the Mountains	(ERPI); Earl K. James	B&W	10m	December 26, 1940	video
Peter Rabbit's Adventures		B&W	11m	February 25, 1948	
Petroleum	Lester E. Klimm	B&W	11m	February 3, 1947	World Energy Resources; video
The Philippines: Land and People	William Deneen & Paul Robert Hanna	color	14m	April 26, 1960	video
Photosynthesis	John Walker (producer); Edgar F. Carell & Ralph Buchsbaum	color	21m	March 1, 1963	Biology program, unit 2: Plant life; revised 1967
Photosynthesis	Bert Von Bork (producer); William V. Mayer	color	20m	1981	
The Physical Environment	Ralph Buchsbaum; camera: Isidore Mankofsky	color	11m	January 28, 1964	Biology program, unit 1: Ecology
Physical Fitness: It Can Save Your Life'	(Avatar Learning); Alan P. Sloan (producer); Robert Bouche; cosnultant: Gerald W. Garner; narrator: John Bartholomew	color	24m	December 27, 1977	
Physics: The Complete Introductory Course	cast: Harvey White	B&W	series of films (30m each)	1957	titles (incomplete): Algebra and Powers of Ten / The Atmosphere / Atomic Accelerators / The Bohr Atom / Change of State / Characteristics of Vacuum Tubes / Color / Cosmic Rays / Density and Weight Density: Laboratory / Diffraction and Interference / Discovery of the Electron / Dispersion / Electromagnetic Waves / Electron Optics / Electron Shell Structure / Electron Charge and Mass / Electronic Charge to Mass Ratio: Laboratory / Elements and their Isotopes: Laboratory / Geiger-Müller and Scintillation Counters / Horsepower: Laboratory / Inside the Nucleus and Fission / Lenses / Light Sources and their Spectra / Measurement of Distances and Angles: Laboratory / Newton's Law of Cooling: Laboratory / Nuclear Disintegration / Nuclear Energy / Oscillators, Amplifiers and Radio / The Photoelectric Effect / Photometry / Photon Collisions and Atomic Waves / Physics: An Exact Science / Polarization of Light / Radar and TV / Radiation Measurements / Radioactivity / Radioactivity Measurements: Laboratory / Reflection from Curved Surfaces / Reflection of Forces / Resonance, Beats and Dobbler Effects / Sound Energy and Hearing / Study of Lenses: Lab Experiment, Light / Transmutation / Units of Measurement / Vacuum Tubes / Wave Lengths of Spectrum Lines: Laboratory / Weighing the Air: Laboratory / X-rays
Pigeons! Pigeons!	Roach Van Allen	color	9m	November 17, 1969	
The Pilgrims	John Barnes; writer: Gilbert Aberg; art director: George Haslam; camera: Michael Livesey; editor Charles Hasse; cast: Simon Lack	B&W	22m	May 3, 1955 (completed '54)	video
The Pilgrims (2nd edition)	Howard Peckham & John I. Cooper	color	16m	1973	
Pioneers of the Plains	(ERPI); James L. Sellers	B&W	11m	December 31, 1941	video
Planets in Orbit - the Laws of Kepler	(Film und Bild); Fred L. Whipple	B&W	10m	February 19, 1960	
Plankton and the Open Sea	Bert Van Bork; writer: Gary W. Lopez; narrator: Kerry Frumk; with Osborne Laboratories of Marine Science	color	19m	September 27, 1962	Basic life science series, unit 5: Plant and animal relationships
Plankton and the Open Sea (2nd edition)	Dr. Mark Huntley & Dr. William V. Mayer	color	22m	1986	video
Plankton: Pastures of the Ocean	Bert Van Bork & George I. Schwartz	color	10m	November 11, 1965	
Planning Our Foreign Policy: Problems of the Middle East		B&W	21m	January 6, 1955	video
Planning Your Career	Harry D. Kitson	color	16m	March 9, 1954	video
Plant Growth	(ERPI); (George) Clyde Fisher	B&W	10m	February 25, 1931	video
Plant Physiology	(Science Pictures); Madeleine Spears (producer); consultant: Philip McCrea; narrator: Franette Liebow	color	25m	1995	
Plant Reproduction	(Science Pictures); Madeleine Spears (producer); consultant: Philip McCrea; narrator: Franette Liebow	color	21m	1995	
Plant Traps	(ERPI); (George) Clyde Fisher	B&W	10m	October 1, 1931	video
Plant Traps: Insect Catchers of the Bog Jungle	Warren P. Everote (producer); William M. Harlow & John Walker; camera: Lynwood Chase	color	10m	December 1954	
The Plantation South	James D. Sage (producer); Ray Allen Billington, Ph.D. (collaboration)	color	16m	March 24, 1960	video
Planter of Colonial Virginia	(ERPI)	B&W	10m	June 25, 1940	video
Planting Our Garden	(Crawley Films)	color	11m	July 24, 1952	video
Plastic Art	(ERPI); Forest Grant	B&W	10m	July 6, 1939	
Plastics	(Science Pictures); Madeleine Spears (producer); Chris Barmer; camera: Tracy Gow; graphics: Anna Newton; consultant: Robert Applebaum	color	16m	1992	
Plato's Apology, the Life and Teachings of Socrates	John Barnes; script: Mortimer J. Adler; cast: Tony Van Bridge, Donald Moffat, George Gitto, Edward Grover & Angelis Alexandris	color	30m	October 29, 1962	video
Play in the Snow	Lawrence E. Briggs	B&W	11m	July 3, 1945	video
The Play of Imagination in Geometry	(ERPI); David Eugene Smith	B&W	10m	February 24, 1931	
Play the Shopping Game (Consumers in a Changing World)	(Avatar Learning); Don Klugman (producer); collaborator: Michael A. MacDowell	color	20m	January 16, 1977	
Playing Good Music - The String Quartet	(Fine Arts Quartet)	B&W	14m	October 20, 1955	video
Pneumonia	(ERPI); Dale C. Stahle, Harrison F. Flippin, Hobart A. Reimann, Edward L. Dortz, Charles L. Brown & W. W. G. MacLachlan	B&W	11m	October 3, 1941	video
Poison Plants	Stanley Croner	color	11m	December 23, 1971	
Poland and the Soviet Power; Background to Recent History		color	26m	February 24, 1961	video
Poland: Land under Communism	John Barnes (producer); Kenneth Richter & Bogdan Zaborski	color	22m	April 26, 1960	video
Polar Bears and Their Frozen World	Scott W. Benton (producer); Lars Aby & Thor Larsen	color	16m	1987	
Police Officer		color	16m	1981	
The Policeman	(ERPI)	B&W	10m	November 30, 1940	video
The Policeman (2nd edition)		B&W	11m	November 1, 1954	video
The Policeman (3rd edition)		color	16m	December 12, 1966	video
Political Parties	John T. Bobbitt (producer); Peter H. Odegard	B&W	21m	October 21, 1952	American Democracy
Political Parties in America: Getting People Together	Robert Agranoff	color	20m	April 1, 1976	
Pompeii and Vesuvius	F. W. Von Keller & E. S. Von Keller (producers); Casper J. Kraemer Jr.; camera: Jack Cardiff	color	11m	March 2, 1951	re-edit of a 1938 "World Windows" short The Eternal Fire; video
Pond Insects	(ERPI); (George) Clyde Fisher	B&W	10m	January 15, 1932	
Pond Life	Curtis L Newcombe	B&W	11m	November 30, 1950	video
Population Ecology	Stanley Croner, Ralph Buchsbaum & Harrison Brown; camera: Isidore Mankofsky	color	19m	February 19, 1964	Biology program, unit 1: Ecology; video
The Portable Phonograph	John Barnes; art director: Carlotta Barrow; cast: Michael Gwynn, William Squire, Philip Locke & David Buck	color	25m	August 24, 1977	Short Story Showcase; second part: A Discussion of...; video
Portion Control: A Team Effort		color	12m	1978	
Postal Service: Letter To A Football Hero	Irving Rusinow (producer); Dorothy A. Moore (consultant); featuring Larry Brown of the Washington Redskins	color	13m	1977	3rd edition of Our Postal Service; video
Posture and Exercise	(ERPI)	B&W	10m	December 19, 1941	video
Posture and Locomotion	(ERPI); Arnold Gesell	B&W	11m	October 15, 1934	Yale University of Child Development
Pottery Making	(ERPI); Forest Grant	B&W	10m	June 23, 1939	
Poultry on the Farm	(ERPI); Arthur I. Gates	B&W	11m	October 1, 1937	video
Poultry on the Farm (2nd edition)	John Walker (producer); Ernest Horn; camera: Isidore Mankofsky	color	10m	March 15, 1960	video
Power and Wheels: The Automobile in Modern Life	William Kay (producer); Leon Stover	color	17m	May 22, 1972	
Practical Film Making	(Julien Films)	color	19m	August 4, 1972	
Practicing Democracy in the Classroom'	(Educational Film Services); Keith Elliott, Theral T. Herrick & George B. Mills	B&W	20m	May 27, 1953	
Prairie Provinces of Canada		B&W	10m	December 28, 1943	video
Preface to Chemistry	Warren P. Everote (producer); Samuel Ralph Powers; camera: Gordon Weisenborn	color	16m	November 25, 1953	video
Preface to Physics	Warren P. Everote (producer); Samuel Ralph Powers	color	15m	May 28, 1954	
Prehistoric Man in Northern Europe		B&W	14m	April 25, 1961	
Prelude to Revolution	Andrew N. Wyeth & John C. Dann	color	12m	April 23, 1975	
Preparation of Oxygen: Seven Demonstrations		color	14m	1970	video
President of the United States: Too Much Power?	(Concept Films); narrator: Hubert Humphrey	color	25m	February 23, 1972	
The President	John T. Bobbitt (producer); Pendleton Herring	B&W	17m	February 16, 1955	video
Presidential Elections	John T. Bobbitt (producer)	B&W	17m	October 9, 1952	American Democracy; video
Pressure Groups (Lobbying: A Case Study)	John T. Bobbitt (producer); Charles E. Merriam	color	20m	November 5, 1952	Political Science; revised 1977; video
Pressure of Light	Hal Kopel	color	21m	1959	
Pride, the Saddle Horse	Ernest Horn & Arthur I. Gates	B&W	11m	1946 ( Jul 3, 1952)	video
Primary Cell: Electricity for Chemical Action	Warren P. Everote (producer); Morris Meister; camera: John Walker	B&W	11m	June 2, 1944	video
The Primary Teacher at Work	(ERPI)	B&W	20m	July 25, 1931	
Primitive Artists of Haiti	Benoit de Tonnancour (producer); AndreÌ de Tonnancour	color	12m	May 12, 1950	
Principles of Baking: Flour Mixtures		B&W	10m	December 16, 1943	
Principles of Cooking: Meats and Vegetables		B&W	10m	December 15, 1943	
Principles of Home Canning		B&W	11m	October 25, 1944	video
Principles of Radio: Receiving Radio Messages		B&W	10m	December 17, 1943	video
Principles of Radio: Vacuum Tubes	Warren P. Everote (producer)	B&W	10m	December 28, 1943	video
Printing through the Ages (Story of Printing)	(Ministry of Education of UK)	B&W	13m	1948 ( October 18, 1950)	video
The Prisoner of Chillon	A.J.H. Pullinger (producer); Clarence W. Hach	color	15m	June 4, 1971 (completed '70)	
Problems of Conservation: Air	John Walker (producer); Gary Lopez	color	15m	July 13, 1968	
Problems of Conservation: Forest and Range	John Walker (producer); Allan A. Sollers & George I. Schwartz	color	14m	March 21, 1969	
Problems of Conservation: Minerals	John Walker (producer); Allan A. Sollers & George I. Schwartz	color	16m	October 1, 1969	
Problems of Conservation: Our Natural Resources	John Walker (producer)	color	11m	April 28, 1970	
Problems of Conservation: Soil	John Walker (producer); Allan A. Sollers & George I. Schwartz	color	14m	October 29, 1969	
Problems of Conservation: Water	John Walker (producer); Gary Lopez	color	16m	June 17, 1969	
Problems of Conservation: Wildlife	John Walker (producer)	color	14m	November 10, 1970	video
Problems of Flight	(ERPI)	B&W	10m	June 12, 1941	
Problems of Housing: The Individual Home	Harold F. Clark	B&W	11m	December 30, 1944	video
Productions of Foods		B&W	11m	May 9, 1946	World Food Problems; video
Productivity, Key to Plenty	J. Fredeic Dewhurst	B&W	11m	March 28, 1949	video
The Progressive Era: Reform Works in America	(UPITN Corporation); James P. Shenton	B&W	23m	August 19, 1971	video
Project Discovery, a Demonstration in Education	Irving Rusinow (producer)	color	29m	July 21, 1965	video
Property Taxation		B&W	11m	March 14, 1946	video
Protists: Form Function and Ecology	Bert Van Bork & Jerry Paulin	color	23m	1985	
Protozoa: One-Celled Animals	Warren P. Everote (producer); Bert Van Bork, John Corliss & Dr. Roman Vishniac	color	11m	March 27, 1957	
Public Opinion	Harold Lasswell	B&W	11m	November 21, 1946	
Pueblo Andaluz in Andlucia	John W Oller	color	14m	February 16, 1966	
Puerto Rico: Its Past, Present, and Promise	William Deneen & Thomas G. Matthews; writer: Elmore Leonard	color	20m	May 13, 1965	video
Pulmonary Tuberculosis (Tuberculosis)	(ERPI); Esmond R. Long, C. Howard Marcy & Charles R. Reynolds	B&W	10m	October 17, 1940	revised 1951
Puppetry: String Marionettes	Frank & Elizabeth Haines	B&W	11m	November 26, 1947	video
Puss in Boots	Grace Storm	color	16m	April 15, 1958	video
Pygmies of Africa (Congo Pygmies)	(ERPI); - H. C. Haven; camera: Attilio Gatti	B&W	10m	October 4, 1939	video

== Q ==
Title	Major credits	B&W or color	Running time	Year/copyright date	Notes
Quest for Flight	(Avatar Learning); David D. Hatfield	color	23m	June 2, 1976 (completed '75)	
Questions About Behavior	(Open University); Nick Watson (producer); consultants: Tim Halliday, Felicity Huntingford & Susan Foster; camera: Tim Chard; editor: Rog Vokes	color	25m	1993	

== R ==
Title	Major credits	B&W or color	Running time	Year/copyright date	Notes
The Raccoons' Picnic	(Crawley Films)	color	5m	November 17, 1954	video
Racing: The Will to Win	(Avatar Learning); Alan P. Sloan (producer); Charles M. Brown	color	17m	1979	Co-produced with 20th Century Fox Television
Radioisotopes: Tools of Discovery	Bert Van Bork & Jay E Howell	color	11m	March 13, 1969	
The Railroad Builders	Stanley Croner (producer); John Walton Caughey; camera: Isidore Mankofsky	color	14m	October 8, 1963	video
Reading Maps	Milan Herzog & John T. Bobbitt (producer); Clarence W. Sorensen	B&W	11m	April 15, 1955	video
The Real Cell	Rissa de la Paz (producer); narrator: Gina Landor	color	23m	1990	
Recognition of Orthopedic Emergencies	Charles F. Finance	color	30m	1980	
Red Fox: A Predator	John Walker (producer); George I. Schwartz	color	10m	1961	
Reflections on Time	(American Geological Institute); Greg Heimer (producer); John Shelton	color	22m	September 2, 1970	
Reflections: A Japanese Folk Tale	Thomas G. Smith	color	19m	August 15, 1975	
The Reformation: Age of Revolt	(Signet Productions); Andrej Kaminski (producer); Paul Asselin; writer: Richard Slote; camera: Jess Paley & Tom Reichman; music: Mike Saul; narrator: James Mason	color	23m	March 14, 1973	Excerpted on VHS as Martin Luther: Beginning of the Reformation (1990s); video
Regulating Body Temperature	Charles F. Finance & Robert Henshaw; camera: Isidore Mankofsky	color	10m	October 2, 1972	Biology program, Unit 4: Physiology
Reindeer in the Arctic: A Study in Adaptation	David Jackson (producer); Dr. Caroline Pond	color	25m	1990	
Remaking Society in the New Nation: 1776-1787		color	21m	1991	
Rembrandt	(Visual Images); David W. Powell & Cherill Anson; consultant: Richard McLanathan	color	7m	1974	Art of Awareness (National Gallery of Art)
The Renaissance: Its Beginnings in Italy	John Barnes (producer); Ulrich Middledorf; writer: Anthony Kerrigan; camera: Michael Livesey & Gianni Boni	color	25m	March 21, 1957	video
Renoir	(Visual Images); David W. Powell & Cherill Anson	color	7m	1974	Art of Awareness (National Gallery of Art)
Reproduction Among Mammals	(ERPI); Dr. H. H. Strandskov	B&W	10m	October 1, 1937	video
Reptiles		color	14m	January 20, 1955	video
The Reptiles of Missouri		color	22m	1985	
The Republic of South Africa, Its Land and Its People	Clarence W. Sorensen	color	17m	July 10, 1963	video
Rescue Squad	John Barnes & P. Craig Smith; camera: Michael Livesey; editor: Robert Johnson	color	14m	January 7, 1972 (filmed '67)	
Respiration in Man	Charles F. Finance & Bertrand J. Shapiro	color	26m	March 19, 1969	Biology program, unit 4: Physiology; video
The Respiratory System	David Alexovich	color	26m	1987	video
Rhinoceros	Jane & Peter Chermayeff	color	11m	1972	Silent Safari; video
Rhythm in Paint	Eliot O'Hara	color	10m	October 18, 1954	
Rhythm: Instruments and Movements	Elizabeth Waterman	B&W	11m	November 30, 1950	
Richard Hunt, Sculptor	Bert Van Bork & Louise Dunn Yochim	color	14m	May 17, 1970	video
Rikki, the Baby Monkey	Frederick A. Ulmer Jr.	B&W	11m	April 22, 1949	video
The Rise of Big Business	John Barnes (producer); Kenneth Vose; narrator: Bob Jordan	color	27m	January 15, 1970	video
The Rise of Labor	John Barnes & Linda Gottlieb	color	30m	December 17, 1968	video
The Rise of the American City		color	32m	August 20, 1970	
The River Valley	Bert Van Bork & Frances M. Hanson	color	11m	March 25, 1964	
Rivers: The Work of Running Waters	(American Geological Institute); Bert Van Bork; narrator: Kerry Frumkin	color	22m	1981	video
Road Map for Change	(Chuck Olin Associates); Chuck Olin & Larry Hall	color	2 shorts (29m each)	1983	
Robert Cavelier, Sieur Dela Salle	(Emerson Film Corp.); Grace Lee Nute	B&W	17m	June 7, 1950	Famous Men & Women of the World
Robin Redbreast	(ERPI); Ernest Horn	B&W	10m	November 3, 1938	
Robin Redbreast (2nd edition)	John Walker (producer); Ernest Horn	color	10m	September 25, 1957	video
The Robot Revolution	David Jay (producer); Bear McKay	color	19m	1984	
The Rock Cycle	Bert Van Bork	color	22m	1982	
Rock: The Beat Goes On	(Avatar Learning); Alan P. Sloan (producer)	color	23m	1979	
Rockets: How They Work	Willy Ley	color	16m	December 1, 1958	video
Rocking Horse Cowboy	(Altus Films); Carl Jones	color	24m	November 5, 1976	
Rocks That Form on the Earth's Surface	Charles F. Finance & John S. Shelton; camera: Isidore Mankofsky	color	16m	June 9, 1964	video
Rocks That Originate Underground	(American Geological Institute); Stanley Croner (producer); Charles F. Finance & John S. Shelton; camera: Isidore Mankofsky	color	23m	April 25, 1966	video
Roger Williams: Founder of Rhode Island	John Barnes; art director: George Halsam; camera: Micheal Livesey; editor: Charles Hasse; cast: Donald Moffat	B&W	28m	October 23, 1956	video
Rome, City Eternal	F. W. Von Keller & E. S. Von Keller (producers); Casper J. Kraemer Jr.; camera: Jack Cardiff	color	11m	March 2, 1951	re-edit of a 1938 "World Windows" short Rome Symphony; video
Room for Discussion	Cyril Orvin Houle	B&W	24m	October 23, 1952	video
Roots of Plants	E. O. Freeland	color	10m	May 14, 1957	
The Roots of Plants	(ERPI); (George) Clyde Fisher; revised by Warren P. Everote	B&W	10m	July 25, 1931	revised 1946; video
Rotterdam - Europort Gateway	Milan Herzog (producer); Irv Rusinow	color	20m	May 26, 1971	
Round the Bend: Plant Tropism	Rissa de la Paz (producer); narrator: Gina Landor	color	25m	1991	
Roy, Sheep Dog of the Scottish Highlands	John Barnes (producer); Helen M Robinson	color	18m	July 23, 1958	video
Rumpelstilzkin	(World TV Corp.) William Wilder	B&W	8m	April 11, 1952	

== S ==
Title	Major credits	B&W or color	Running time	Year/copyright date	Notes
Safety Adventures Out of Doors	Cecil G. Zaun	color	11m	March 16, 1959	video
Safety in the Home	Stanley Croner (producer); Bill Varney & Vivian Weedon; camera: Isidore Mankofsky	color	12m	May 27, 1965	video
Safety in the Home	(ERPI)	B&W	10m	October 10, 1940	
Safety in the Home (2nd edition)		B&W	13m	June 25, 1951	
Safety in the Home (3rd edition)	Stanley Croner (producer); Bill Varney & Vivian Weedon; camera: Isidore Mankofsky	color	12m	May 27, 1965	
Safety in the Home (4th edition)	Bruce Hoffman	color	12m	1990	
Safety in the Work Place (series 1)	(Centron Corporation co-production); Robert Kohl (producer); Ralph Mizia; s Andrea Warren; consultant: Vernon Speiser	color	5 shorts (12m each)	1989	titles: Protecting Your Head / Protecting Your Ears / Protecting Your Feet / Protecting Your Eyes / Protecting Your Hands
Safety in the Work Place (series 2)	(Centron Corporation co-production); Robert Kohl (producer); Ralph Mizia; s Andrea Warren; consultant: Vernon Speiser	color	4 shorts (12-13m each)	1990	titles: Handling Fire Extinguishers / Preventing Back Injuries / Reducing Office Injury / Using Ladders
Safety in the Work Place: Avoiding Slips, Trips and Falls	Centron Corporation coproduction); Donald L. Leonard (producer); Charles M. Weber & John M. Sanger	color	10m	1990	
Safety on Our School Bus	Dennis S. Johnson	color	11m	September 11, 1957	revised 1980; video
Safety on the Playground	John Barnes & Gordon Weisenborn	B&W	11m	April 20, 1953	
Safety on the Playground (2nd edition)	Stanley Croner (executive producer); Warren Brown (producer/director)	color	13m	1966	
Safety on the Playground (3rd edition)	Bruce Hoffman	color	12m	1990	
Safety on the Street	Herbert James Stack & Hal Kopel	color	10m	April 8, 1952	video
Safety on the Street (2nd edition)	Stanley Croner (producer); Bill Varney; camera: Isidore Mankofsky	color	10m	January 25, 1966	video
Safety on the Street (3rd version)	Bruce Hoffman	color	12m	1990	
Safety with Electricity	Donald A. Boyer	color	10m	January 22, 1963	
Sailing a Toy Boat		color	5m	October 2, 1952	video
The St. Lawrence Seaway		color	16m	October 26, 1959	
The Salmon Story	(Viking Pictures); Richard van Cleve	color	11m	November 30, 1950	
The Salt Marsh, a Question of Values	Stanley Croner & Robert Reimold	color	22m	March 5, 1975	video
The San Andreas Fault	(American Geological Institute); Bert Van Bork (producer); William H. Matthews & John S. Shelton	color	21m	February 4, 1974	video
Santa Fe and the Trail	Stanley Croner & John W. Caughey; camera: Isidore Mankofsky	color	20m	April 9, 1963	video
Save Those Teeth	Warren P. Everote (producer); James R. Blayney & Walter G. Zoller	B&W	11m	September 21, 1949	video
Scag: The Story of Heroin	(Concept Films)	color	21m	September 21, 1970	
Scandinavia		B&W	15m	June 30, 1950	video
Scandinavia: Norway, Sweden, Denmark	William Deneen & George Kish	color	22m	June 11, 1962 (completed '61)	video
School for Ted	Irving Rusinow (producer)	color	11m	November 5, 1964	video
Schoolhouse in Red	(Agra Films- W.K. Kellogg Foundation)	color	40m	December 1948	
Science and Agriculture (The Soybean)	(ERPI); W. L. Burlison	B&W	11m	December 21, 1939	revised 1953; video
Science Essentials: Animals'	Martha Hopkins (producer); Gary Lopez & David J. McGowan; Kathryn Hallenstein (editor manager); Lawrence F. Lowery (consultant); animation: Steve Boyer	color	7m	1989	titles: What Is An Animal? / What Do Animals Need to Live? / How Do Animals Respond to the World? / How Do Animals Travel?
Science Essentials: Ecosystems'	Martha Hopkins (producer); Gary Lopez; Lawrence F. Lowery (consultant); designer: Richard Laurant	color	4 shorts (7m each)	1990	titles: What Is An Ecosystem? / Desert Ecosystem / Forest Ecosystem / Freshwater Pond Ecosystem
Science Essentials: Electricity and Magnetism'	Philip Stockton (producer); Gary Lopez & David J. McGowan; consultants: Lawrence F. Lowery & Alan McCormack; animation: Steve Boyer	color	4 shorts (8m each)	1989	titles: What Is Electricity? / How Does Electricity Travel? / What Is magnetism? / What Is Electromagnetism?
Science Essentials: Geology'	Martha Hopkins (producer); Gary Lopez & David J. McGowan; Kathryn Hallenstein (editor manager); Lawrence F. Lowery (consultant); animation: Steve Boyer	color	4 shorts (8m each)	1989	titles: How Does Wind Shape the Earth? / How Does Water Shape the Earth's Surface? / How Do Living Things Shape the Earth's Surface? / What Are the Different Shapes on the Earth's Surface?
Science Essentials: Heat'	Philip Stockton (producer); Gary Lopez & David J. McGowan; consultants: Lawrence F. Lowery & Alan McCormack; animation: Steve Boyer	color	4 shorts (8m each)	1988	titles: What Is Heat? / How Does Heat Travel? / How Does Heat Change Material? / Sources and Uses of Heat
Science Essentials: Human Body'	Martha Hopkins (producer); Gary Lopez & David J. McGowan; Lawrence F. Lowery (consultant); animation: Steve Boyer	c4 shorts (6m each)	1989	titles: How Does Your Body Move? / How Does Your Body Use Food? / How Does Your Body Use Air? / How Does Your Body Make Sense of the World?	
Science Essentials: Learning About Matter'	Martha Hopkins (producer); Gary Lopez & David J. McGowan; Lawrence F. Lowery (consultant); animation: Steve Boyer	color	6 shorts (7m each)	1990	titles: Looking for Gases / Looking for Liquids / Looking for Solids / How Do Gases Change? / How Do Liquids Change? / How Do Solids Change?
Science Essentials: Light'	Martha Hopkins (producer); Gary Lopez & David J. McGowan; Lawrence F. Lowery (consultant); animation: Steve Boyer	color	4 shorts (7m each)	1989	titles: What Is Light? / How Does Light Travel? / How Do Lenses Work? / What is Color?
Science Essentials: Matter'	Martha Hopkins (producer); Gary Lopez & David J. McGowan; Lawrence F. Lowery (consultant); animation: Steve Boyer	color	4 shorts (7m each)	1990	titles: How Does Matter Change State? / What Is a Gas? / What Is a Liquid? / What Is a Solid?
Science Essentials: Plants'	Martha Hopkins (producer); Gary Lopez & David J. McGowan; Lawrence F. Lowery (consultant); animation: Steve Boyer	color	4 shorts (7m each)	1989	titles: What Is a Plant? / What Do Plants Need to Live? / How Do Plants Respond to the World? / How Do Plants Travels?
Science Essentials: Simple Machines & Motions'	Martha Hopkins (producer); Gary Lopez; Lawrence F. Lowery (consultant); animators: David Wood & David Hancock	color	4 shorts (7m each)	1990	titles: What Makes Things Move? / What Is An Inclined Plane? / What Is a Lever? / What Is a Pulley?
Science Essentials: Sound'	Philip Stockton (producer); Gary Lopez & David J. McGowan; consultants: Lawrence F. Lowery & Alan McCormack; animation: Steve Boyer	color	8m	1988	titles: What Is Sound? / How Does Sound Travel? / What Makes Sounds Different? / The Uses of Sound
Science Essentials: Weather'	Martha Hopkins (producer); Gary Lopez & David J. McGowan; Kathryn Hallenstein (editor manager); Lawrence F. Lowery (consultant); animation: Steve Boyer	color	4 shorts (8m each)	1989	titles: What Makes Wind? / What Makes rain? / What makes Clouds? / What Makes Weather?
The Scientific Method'	John Bobbitt & Warren P. Everote (producer); Philipp K. Frank	color	12m	March 18, 1954	video
The Sea'	Michael Birch (producer); Ralph Buchsbaum	color	27m	September 27, 1962	Biology program, unit 1: Ecology; video
Sea Adventures of Sandy the Snail		color	16m	April 18, 1957	
Sea Beneath the Earth	Bert Van Bork (producer)	color	22m	1983	
Sea Life around Baja California		color	24m	1987	
The Sea: Mysteries of the Deep	(Avatar Learning); Alan P. Sloan (producer)	color	23m	1977	video
The Seaport	Larry Yust & Ernest Horn; camera: Isidore Mankofsky; music: Ramblin' Jack Elliott	color	16m	February 26, 1962	video
Seashore Life	Warren P. Everote (producer); George L. Clarke	color	11m	December 29, 1950	video
Seasonal Affective Disorder	(Open University); Nick Watson; consultant: Tim Halliday	color	25m	1993	
Seasons of Survival	Wolfgang Bayer	color	22m	1983	
The Second World War: Allied Victory	Michael Birch (producer); Louis Leo Snyder	B&W	28m	September 30, 1963	video
The Second World War: Prelude to Conflict	Michael Birch (producer); Louis Leo Snyder	B&W	29m	June 30, 1964	video
The Second World War: Triumph of the Axis'	Michael Birch (producer); Louis Leo Snyder	B&W	25m	September 23, 1963	video
The Secret Sharer	Larry Yust & Clifton Fadiman; camera: Isidore Mankofsky; cast: David Soul, Aron Kincaid, Paul Brinegar, William "Billy" Benedict, Patrick Campbell, Johnnie Collins III & Buck Kartalian	color	30m	February 27, 1973	Short Story Showcase; second part: A Discussion of Joseph Conrad's The Secret Sharer; video
Seed Dispersal	(ERPI); (George) Clyde Fisher	B&W	10m	May 25, 1931	video
Seed Dispersal (2nd edition)	John Walker & Warren P. Everote (producer); Floyd Swink	color	11m	September 24, 1956	video
Seed Dispersal (3rd edition)	John Walker(producer); Floyd Swink	color	11m	March 9, 1971	video
Seed Germination	William M. Harlow	color	14m	October 25, 1960	
Seeds of Destruction	(New York Zoological Society); George Brewer (producer); John H. Storer	color	11m	July 6, 1948	The Living Forest; video
Segmentation: The Annelid Worms'	John Walker (producer); Lester Ingle	color	16m	January 26, 1962	Biology program, unit 3: Animal life; video
Self Discovery in a Mirror	Arnold Gesell	B&W	11m	November 21, 1946	Yale University of Child Development
Sending Radio Messages	(ERPI); Wilbur L. Beauchamp	B&W	11m	June 2, 1943	video
The Senses and Perception, Links to the Outside World	Charles F. Finance (producer); Lawrence Kruger	color	18m	August 15, 1975	
Separate But Equal		color	8m	December 23, 1971	
Series and Parallel Circuits	Morris Meister	B&W	11m	April 3, 1944	video
Settlement of the Mississippi Valley (The Westward Movement Part 2)'	William Deneen & Ray Allen Billington	color	16m	February 20, 1962	video
Settlers of the Old Northwest Territory (The Westward Movement Part 1)	William Deneen & Ray Allen Billington	color	16m	April 10, 1962	video
Settling of the Great Plains (The Westward Movement Part 3)	Stanley Croner & John W. Caughey; camera: Isidore Mankofsky	color	17m	July 26, 1963	video
Settling the Old Northwest'	(Advanced American Communications); Robert C. Peters & B. Don Greene (producer); Glenn & Karen Winters	color	18m	1990	
Settling the Oregon Territory	(Advanced American Communications); Robert C. Peters & B. Don Greene (producer); Glenn & Karen Winters	color	18m	1990	
Sewing	Hal Kopel (producer); Irene H Buchanan	B&W	11m	November 18, 1953	video
Shark: Maneater or Myth?	(Avatar Learning); Donald R. Nelson	color	23m	July 22, 1976	
Sharks and Rays		color	23m	1990	
Shaw vs. Shakespeare I: The Character of Caesar	John Barnes; art director: George Drew; camera: Beda Batka; editor: Robert Johnson; cast: Donald Moffat, Richard Kiley, Frances Sternhagen, Ernest Graves & Donald Madden	color	33m	June 27, 1970	video
Shaw vs. Shakespeare II: The Tragedy of Julius Caesar	John Barnes; art director: George Drew; camera: Beda Batka; editor: Robert Johnson; cast: Donald Moffat, Richard Kiley, Frances Sternhagen, Ernest Graves & Donald Madden	color	35m	August 26, 1970	video
Shaw vs. Shakespeare III: Caesar and Cleopatra	John Barnes; art director: George Drew; camera: Beda Batka; editor: Robert Johnson; cast: Donald Moffat, Richard Kiley, Frances Sternhagen, Ernest Graves & Donald Madden	color	30m	August 27, 1970	video
Sheep Rancher	Maclovia Rodriguez	color	16m	January 5, 1968	
Shell Fishing	(ERPI); Wallace Walter Atwood	B&W	10m	August 4, 1938	
Shelley Whitebird's First Powwow	(Lifestyle Productions); Doreen Porter	color	8m	January 6, 1977	
Shelter	Hermann D. Tauchert (producer); Edward P. Storke	color	11m	1979	
Shelter (2nd edition)	John Barnes	B&W	11m	September 28, 1955 (completed '54)	
Shelter	(ERPI); Wallace Walter Atwood	B&W	10m	October 15, 1937	video
Shep the Farm Dog	(ERPI); Ernest Horn	B&W	10m	December 20, 1939	
Shielded Metal - Arc Welding 1-3'.		color	3 parts	1969	
Shooting in Basketball	Wilbur Johns	B&W	11m	May 31, 1946	video
Should I Go to College?	Dr. Harvey White	color	29m	December 19, 1957	
The Sideshow	(Crocos Productions); John Barnes; camera: Adam Gifford; cast: Marcel Marceau	color	8m	April 7, 1975	Art of Silence; video
Simple Machines	(ERPI); H. Horton Sheldon	B&W	10m	December 29, 1941	video
Simple Machines: The Inclined Plane Family	Milton O. Pella	color	11m	May 13, 1960	
Simple Machines: The Lever Family (Lever, Pulley, Wheel and Axle)		color	14m	September 18, 1963	
Simple Plants: The Algae	Michael Birch (producer); Richard T. Hartman	color	17m	June 18, 1962	revised in 1988 with producer Scott W. Benton; video
The Single-Celled Animals: Protozoa	Bert Van Bork & William Kay (producer); Robert Hull & Ralph Buchsbaum	color	17m	March 9, 1962	Biology program, unit 3: Animal life; video
The Sinking of the Lusitania: Unrestricted Submarine Warfare		B&W	17m	1964	video
Siqueiros, El Maestro	Bert Van Bork	color	14m	June 30, 1969	
Sir Francis Drake: The Rise of England Sea Power	John Barnes; art director George Haslam; camera: Michael Livesey; editor: CharlesHasse; cast: Michael Goodliff	B&W	29m	June 3, 1957	
The Skeleton	Milan Herzog (producer); Karl E Mason	B&W	12m	May 25, 1953	video
The Skeleton (2nd edition)	Charles F. Finance	color	17m	1979	
Skiing: Beginning Movements		color	11m	December 1965	
The Skin: Its Texture and Function	Bruce Hoffman	color	20m	1983	
Skipper Learns a Lesson	Paul Burnford	color	9m	March 14, 1952	
Sleep for Health	Milan Herzog (producer); Nathaniel Kleitman	B&W	11m	June 28, 1950	video
Sleeping Beauty	(World TV Corp.); William Wilder	B&W	8m	April 11, 1952	
Small Fry Pony Express		B&W	11m	October 24, 1949	
The Snake: Villain or Victim?	(Avatar Learning); Alan P. Sloan (producer); Jarn Winther	color	22m	August 25, 1976	
The Snapping Turtle	(ERPI); Lynwood Chace	B&W	10m	December 26, 1940	video
Soap (Science of Soap)	Warren P. Everote (producer); James W. McBain; camera: Andrew Costikyan	B&W	11m	April 16, 1948	video
Social Insects: The Honeybee	John Barnes (producer); Alfred Edwards Emerson	color	24m	October 18, 1960	Biology program, unit 3: Animal life; video
Social Primates	(Open University); Rissa de la Paz (producer)	color	40m	1993	
The Social Process: Values and Institutions	John T. Bobbitt (producer); Harold Lasswell	B&W	24m	October 9, 1952	American Democracy
Social Revolution	John T. Bobbitt (producer); Hans Kohn	color	17m	November 5, 1952	video
Soft Soldering		color	series of 8mm film loops (4m each)	1969	titles: Applying the Solder / Bonded Theory / The Range of Soft Soldering / Using the Tools: Portable Belt and Orbital Sanders / Portable Electric Drills / Portable Electric Routers / Portable Electric Routers / Portable Saber Saws
Solar Eclipses	Robert L. McDonell, advisor: Dave Smith; artists: Arlene Skarani, Anthony A. Morse & Gloriana Gill	color	13m	1979	
The Solar Family	(ERPI); Walter Bartky	B&W	10m	November 15, 1936	video
The Solar System (2nd edition)	Thomas G. Smith; collaboration: William H. Matthews & Allan Sandage; narrator: Richard Basehart	color	17m	December 5, 1977 (completed '76)	video
Sound and How It Travels	Alexander B. Costea	color	11m	February 23, 1963	video
Sound Recording and Reproduction	(ERPI)	B&W	10m	April 15, 1943	video
Sound Science: You Can Do It'	Philip Stockton (producer); Scott W. Benton	color	12m	1986	
Sound Waves and Their Sources	Warren P. Everote (producer)	B&W	11m	October 5, 1950	video
South Pacific Island Children: Life in Fiji (Jeunesse de Fidji)		color	11m	May 23, 1951	Children of Many Lands; video
The South: Roots of Urban Crisis	Stanley Croner & Charles F. Gritzner	color	27m	March 28, 1969	
The Southeastern States (2nd edition)	Carl Dudley (producer); Howard W. Odum (adviser)	color	11m	July 30, 1956	video
The Southeastern United States	(ERPI); Howard W. Odum (adviser)	B&W	10m	December 31, 1942	video
The Southwestern States (2nd edition)	Carl Dudley (producer); Howard W. Odum (adviser)	color	11m	June 7, 1954 (completed '53)	video
The Southwestern United States	(ERPI); Howard W. Odum (adviser)	B&W	11m	December 31, 1942	video
The Soviet Challenge: Industrial Revolution in Russia	Milan Herzog (producer); Alfred J. Rieber	B&W	26m	September 21, 1962	video
The Soviet Union: A Student's Life	Milan Herzog (producer); Arnold Michaelis	color	21m	May 22, 1972	
The Soviet Union: An Epic Land	Milan Herzog (producer); Arnold Michaelis	color	29m	December 8, 1971	
The Soviet Union: Faces of Today	Milan Herzog (producer); Arnold Michaelis	color	21m	November 2, 1972	
Space Exploration: A Team Effort	John Barnes & John Young	color	24m	1972	
Space Probes: Exploring Our Solar System	(Haberstroh Studios); Willy Ley	color	11m	June 30, 1964	video (black & white version) video
Spain in the New World: Colonial Life in Mexico	William Deneen (producer); Irving R. Leonard	color	13m	September 5, 1961	
Spanish Children (La Familia Sanchez)	Harold S. Kemp; S.M. Trevino (Spanish version)	B&W	11m	December 31, 1948	Children of Many Lands; video
Spanish Children	William Deneen & Elizabeth Graf	color	16m	August 19, 1964	video
The Spanish Explorers	(Crawley Films); Theodore E. Lange as collaborator	color	15m	October 4, 1965	video
Speak Up with Confidence	(National Educational Media); Jack L. Copeland (producer); Kip Walton; writer: Don Hall; hosts: Jack Valenti & Dinah Shore	color	3 parts (40m each)	1985	
The Speed of Light: Measurement and Application	Robert Longini (producer); Harvey B. Lemon	color	14m	January 28, 1955	video
Spiders	(ERPI); (George) Clyde Fisher	B&W	10m	October 1, 1931	
Spiders (2nd edition)	Warren P. Everote (producer); Howard K. Wallace; camera: Lynwood Chase	color	11m	July 6, 1956	
The Spinal Column, Structure and Function of Man		B&W	11m	August 9, 1956	video
The Spirit of Romanticism	John Barnes & Joan Micklin Silver; art director: Carlotta Barrow; camera: Alfred Hicks; cast: Tim Piggot	color	16m	September 21, 1977 (completed '76)	video
The Spirit of the Renaissance	John Barnes & Linda Gottlieb; camera: Mauro Barboni; editor: Paul Stein	color	31m	January 28, 1971	video
Spring in the City		color	11m	January 16, 1969	
Spring on the Farm	E. Laurence Palmer	color	11m	November 24, 1947	video
Standing Waves and the Principle of Superposition	Ron Sorri (producer); Albert V. Baez	color	11m	May 28, 1971	
Star Recognition: A Guide to the Heavens		color	22m	1985	
Stars and Constellations	Robert L. McDonell, advisor: Dave Smith; artists: Arlene Skarani, Anthony A. Morse & Gloriana Gill	color	16m	1979	
Stars and Star Systems	(Institut für Film und Bild); John Walker (producer); Fred L. Whipple	B&W	16m	February 16, 1960	
Starting School		color	14m	July 20, 1973	
State Government: Resurgence of Power'	(Concept Films) Gregory Epler	color	21m	April 1, 1976	
Static Electricity (Electrostatics)	(World TV Corp.); Warren P. Everote (producer);	B&W	10m	June 8, 1950	
The Staunch Tin Soldier	(Ake Soderquist for Filmkonsult AB); Rod Geiger	color	27m	1971	
The Steam Age (History of Transportation, Part 1)	Ralph E. Turner	color	17m	September 18, 1958	video
The Steam Engine: How It Works		B&W	11m	January 4, 1961	
Stinging Celled Animals: Coelenterates'	Bert Van Bork (producer); Ralph Buchsbaum	color	16m	April 20, 1962	Biology program, unit 3: Animal life; video
Stonehenge		color	24m	1991	
Stonehenge: Mystery in the Plain		color	24m	1980	
Storms: The Restless Atmosphere	(American Geological Institute); William Kay (producer); T. Theodore Fujita	color	21m28s	April 29, 1974	
Story Into Film: The Portable Phonograph	John Barnes	color	10m	September 29, 1977	Short Story Showcase; video
The Story of Christopher Columbus	(Emerson Film Corp.); Walter Colmes	color	18m	March 15, 1948	Famous Men & Women of the World; video
A Story of Discovery: Why Plants Bend Toward Light	(Australian Academy of Science); Stanley Croner (producer); Charles F. Finance	color	13m	November 17, 1966	Basic Life Sciences, The World of Green Plants; video
Story of Palomar	Karl G. Henzie; camera: Isidore Mankofsky	color	39m	1960	video
The Story of Potatoes	(Viking Pictures)	color	12m	November 17, 1952	
The Story of Rice	(Viking Pictures)	color	11m	October 28, 1952	
The Story of Sugar	(Viking Pictures)	color	11m	August 19, 1953	video
Stress	(Open University); Nick Watson; consultant: Frederick Toates; camera: Tim Chard & Horst Hartmann; editor: Jill Huxley	color	24m	1993	
The String Choir	(ERPI); James Brill, revised with Peter W. Dykema	B&W	10m	March 7, 1931	revised 1938
The String Choir (2nd edition)'	Milan Herzog (producer); Ralph E. Rush; music: Hans Swarowsky & Vienna Symphony	color	11m	September 20, 1956	video
A Study of Infant Behavior	(ERPI); Arnold Gesell	B&W	10m	November 1, 1930	Yale University of Child Development
Succession, from Sand Dune to Forest	David Ridgeway (producer); Orlando Park	color	16m	October 11, 1960	Biology program, unit 1: Ecology; video
Succession, from Sand Dune to Forest	Scott W. Benton	color	16m	1988	
Succession on Lava	Bert Van Bork (producer); Ralph Buchsbaum & Maxwell S. Doty	color	13m	July 22, 1970	Biology program, unit 1: Ecology
The Suez Canal: Gateway to World Trade	William Deneen & Mahmoud Younes	color	11m	September 21, 1962	
Summer on the Farm	E. Laurence Palmer	color	11m	November 24, 1947	video
The Sun - Its Power and Promise	(Avatar Learning)	color	23m	February 14, 1977	video
The Sunfish	(ERPI)	B&W	10m	December 12, 1941	video
Sunrise Serenades (Prairie Grouse)	(American Museum of Natural History)	color	10m	December 1, 1949	
The Supreme Court	John T. Bobbitt (producer); Alpheus Thomas Mason	B&W	18m	December 9, 1954	video
Surface Tension in Fluid Mechanics	Lloyd M. Trefethen	color	10m	1963	video
A Surprise for Jean	John Barnes & Gordon Weisenborn	color	5m	October 2, 1952	video
Susan B. Anthony	(Emerson Film Corp.); Ray Allen Billington	B&W	18m	August 10, 1951	Famous Men & Women of the World
Switzerland: Life in a Mountain Village	Clarence W. Sorenson	color	14m	June 3, 1963	
The Symphony Orchestra	(ERPI); Peter W. Dykema	B&W	13m	March 21, 1938	
The Symphony Orchestra (2nd edition)	Milan Herzog (producer); Ralph E. Rush; music: Hans Swarowsky & Vienna Symphony	color	11m	October 9, 1956	
Synthetic Fibers: Nylon and Rayon	Malcolm Dole	B&W	14m	December 9, 1949	video

== T ==
Title	Major credits	B&W or color	Running time	Year/copyright date	Notes
Tackling in Football	Andrew Kerr	B&W	11m	May 31, 1946	video
Taking Care of Our Garden	(Crawley Films)	color	10m	July 24, 1952	
Tale of King Midas		color	18m	May 30, 1974	
Tale of Rumpelstiltskin	Kent Smith; camera: Thomas G. Smith, Paul Leimback & Paul Deason	color	21m	March 15, 1974	StarringRainbeaux Smith as the miller's daughter.
A Tale of the Fiords	(Aktiebolaget Svenski Filmindustri); Arne Sucksdorff	B&W	12m	July 27, 1955	Original film edited from Den Drömda Dalen (1947);
A Talking Valentine		color	5m	December 9, 1953	
Talking with Thoreau	David Bower, B. F. Skinner & Elliot Richardson	color	29m	April 23, 1975	
The Teacher	K. Richard Johnson	B&W	16m	May 4, 1951	video
Teaching French with Films, Part I: Listening and Speaking	Irving Rusinov	color	26m	September 23, 1966	
The Teaching of Reading	(ERPI); Arthur I. Gates	B&W	20m	March 28, 1931	
Teaching with Sound Films	(ERPI)	B&W	11m	1936	video
Technical Drawing	(Eothen Films)	color	series of 8mm film loops (4m each)	1971	titles: Manufacturer's Dimensioning Techniques / Positioning and Dimensioning Features / Symbols and Tolerances
Techniques in Chemistry		color	series of 8mm film loops (3m each)	July 6, 1964	titles: Analytical Balance: Tare Weight Determination / Analytical Balance: Weighing Sample and Container / Decanting and Washing a Residue / Filtering / Titrating with Phenolphtalein / Using a Burette / Weighing Procedure / Weighing, Triple Beam Balance
Teenage Relationships: Vanessa and Her Friends	Rose M. Somerville	color	19m	August 24, 1973	
The Teeth, Development and Care'	John Oppie McCall	B&W	11m	December 30, 1944	video
The Telescope	(Aesop Films); William Van Horn	color		1976	animated cartoon
Television Behind the Scenes	(Avatar Learning)	color	23m	1979	
Telling An Old Story'	(Learning Designs); Charlotte Zwerin	color	22m	1985	video
The Temperate Deciduous Forest	Bert Van Bork & Ralph Buchsbaum	color	16m	January 26, 1962	Biology program, unit 1: Ecology
Tennessee Williams, Theater in Process	(Signet Productions); Suzanne Tedesko (producer); Richard Slote	color	29m	April 29, 1976	
Texas and the Mexican Succession	(Advanced American Communications); Robert C. Peters & B. Don Greene (producer); Glenn & Karen Winters	color	14m	1990	
Texas and the Mexican War	(Tilton Rogers Films); John W. Caughey	color	17m	November 11, 1966	
Texture	Paul Burnford	color	6m	August 18, 1954	Art in Action; video
Thailand, Land of Rice	William Deneen & Clarence W. Sorensen	color	14m	July 26, 1957	
A Thanksgiving Play	Grace Storm	color	6m	October 23, 1953	
The Theater: One of the Humanities	(Massachusetts Council for the Humanities); John Barnes & Douglas Campbell; writer: Clifton Fadiman; camera: Michael Livesey; editor: Robert Johnson	color	29m	1959	video
Theories on the Origin of Life	Bert Van Bork & Cyril Ponnamperuma	color	14m	April 23, 1969	video
The Theory of Flight	(ERPI)	B&W	10m	June 12, 1941	video
Thermodynamics	(ERPI); H. Horton Sheldon	B&W	10m	November 3, 1938	video
Thermometers and How They Work	Fred Strauss	color	10m	March 12, 1963	
Things Change: Solids, Liquids, Gases		color	10m	April 15, 1969	
A Thirty-six Weeks Behavior Day	(ERPI); Arnold Gesell	B&W	11m	February 4, 1935	Yale University of Child Development
This Is High School		color	15m	January 10, 1973	
This Vital Earth	(New York Zoological Society); George Brewer (producer); John H. Storer	color	11m	July 6, 1948	The Living Forest; video (black & white print)
Thomas Jefferson	(Emerson Film Corp.); Julian P. Boyd	B&W	19m	September 27, 1949	Famous Men & Women of the World; video
Thomas Jefferson (2nd edition)'	(Osmond Commercial Productions); Ron A. McCroby; writers: Kevin & Khaliel Kelly	color	13m	1980	Great Americans
Thomas Paine	Andrew N. Wyeth (producer); Jan C. Dann	color	14m	April 23, 1975	
Three Fox Fables (Fox and the Grapes / Fox and Stork or Fox and the Crane / Fox and the Crow)	Grace Storm	B&W	11m	February 23, 1948	video
Three Fox Tales	Paul Buchbinder; animation: Stephen Boyer, Julia Bunn & Ray Toy; narrator: Russ Reed	color	11m	1984	animated cartoon video
Three Little Kittens (Kittens Three)	(ERPI); Ernest Horn, Arthur I. Gates	B&W	10m	January 3, 1939	revised 1953; video
Thrills of the Surf (In Australia)		B&W	11m	May 20, 1949	
Throwing in Baseball	Jimmy Dykes & Hollis Thurston	B&W	11m	February 11, 1947	video
Thrushes and Relatives	(ERPI); T. Gilbert Pearson	B&W	10m	July 25, 1938	
Tiny Water Animals	(ERPI); narrator: Roy Waldo Miner	B&W	10m	October 1, 1931	
Tippy, the Town Dog	Paul Burnford	color	10m	January 25, 1952	video
To Save a Life: Burns'	(Morning Star Films); Linda Stanley (producer); script: Lee Stanley	color	15m	1982	
To Save a Life: Choking	(Centron Corporation co-production); Thomas G. Smith (producer)	color	11m	May 27, 1977	
To Save a Life: CPR	(Centron Corporation co-production); Thomas G. Smith (producer)	color	11m	August 4, 1977	
To Save a Life: Poisons	(Morning Star Films); Linda Stanley (producer); script: Lee Stanley	color	15m	1982	
To Save a Life: Survival Swimming	(Centron Corporation co-production); Thomas G. Smith (producer)	color	15m	July 27, 1977	
Tobacco and the Human Body	Milan Herzog (producer); C. A. Mills	B&W	15m	October 8, 1954	video
The Tobacco Problem: What Do You Think? '	(Oscar Auerbach	color	17m	December 23, 1971	
Tom Savage: Boy of Early Virginia	Milan Herzog (producer); Clarence L. Ver Steeg	color	22m	April 3, 1958	video
Tops'	Charles and Ray Eames; music: Elmer Bernstein	color	8m	1969	video
Trail of the Buffalo	Hugh & Suzanne Johnston (producers)	color	9m	1983	
Transportation, a Basic Need'	(Odyssey Productions); Steve Helser	color	12m	1980	
The Tree of Truth: A Relationship Between Addition and Subtraction	(Davidson Films); Elizabeth Janeway	color	12m	October 9, 1975	Math That Counts
Trees and Their Importance	John Walker (producer); William M. Harlow	color	12m	December 8, 1966	Basic Life Sciences, The World of Green Plants
Trigonometry		B&W	30m	1957	
A Trip to the Moon	Milan Herzog & William Peltz)- F. W. Schlesinger; art direction: Warren P. Everote	color	16m	December 19, 1957	video
A Trip to the Planets	Milan Herzog & Alex Haberstroh)- Richard Cromer	color	15m	March 6, 1963	
The Tropical Rain Forest	John Walker (producer); Ralph Buchsbaum; supervisor: Warren P. Everote	color	16m	December 19, 1961	Biology program, unit 1: Ecology; video
The Truck Driver	J. F. Rosborough	color	16m	September 18, 1958	video
The Truck Farmer	(ERPI)	B&W	10m	June 2, 1939	revised by John Walker in 1954; 2nd version video
Tuberculosis (3rd Edition)	Esmond R. Long & C. Howard Marcy	B&W	11m	December 16, 1955	video
Tugboat Captain (Tugboat Skipper)	John Barnes & P. Craig Smith; camera: Isidore Mankofsky; editor: Robert Johnson	color	14m	January 26, 1972 (completed '67)	video
Tugboats	Milan Herzog)- Alvina Treut	B&W	11m	November 28, 1947	
Turkey, Emergence of a Modern Nation	Sydney N. Fisher	color	17m	March 3, 1963	video
Turn Off Pollution	Alan Spencer	color	11m	March 29, 1971	video
TV News Behind the Scenes	John Barnes (producer); Michael Livesey & Randolph Hobler; editor: Robert Johnson; cast includes a young Geraldo Rivera, interviews with Burt Reynolds and Dyan Cannon	color	27m	August 17, 1973	video
Twins Are Individuals: from Infancy to Adolescence	Arnold Gesell	B&W	11m	November 21, 1946	Yale University of Child Development; video
Two Boys of Ethiopia	(Visual Education Centre)	color	20m	November 30, 1970	

== U ==
Title	Major credits	B&W or color	Running time	Year/copyright date	Notes
U.S. Cities: Growth and Development	David Jay (producer); Bear McKay	color	19m	1984	
U.S.A. Capital City, Washington, D.C.		color	22m	December 11, 1964	
The Ugly Duckling	Warren P. Everote (producer); Lynwood Chase	color	10m	January 22, 1953	video
Understanding the Law: Equal Justice	Milan Herzog (producer)	B&W	12m	June 25, 1953	video
Understanding Vitamins	Milan Herzog (producer); John B. Youmans	color	14m	October 23, 1952	video
Union of South Africa: Its Land and Its People	Clifford J. Kamen (producer); Clarence W. Sorenson	color	17m	August 31, 1956	video
The Unique Contribution	Maurice B. Mitchell	color	30m	June 4, 1959	video
The United States Congress: Of, By and for the People	Scott Anderson	color	26m	December 11, 1972	
United States Region: The Mountain Region	Paul Buchbinder	color	22m	1986	
United States Region: The Northeast	Dennis S. Johnson	color	22m	1987	
United States Region: The Pacific Region		color	23m	1989	
United States Region: The Southeast	Paul Buchbinder	color	20m	1986	
United States Region: The Southwest	Paul Buchbinder	color	22m	1986	
United States Regions, Contrasts of Land and People	Ulf Backstrom (producer);	color	26m	1986	
The United States Supreme Court: Guardian of the Constitution	(Concept Films); Scott Anderson	color	24m	June 11, 1973	
The Universe: Beyond the Solar System	Thomas G. Smith (producer); Allan Sandage; narrator: Richard Basehart	color	18m	1978	video
Ups/Downs	(Concept Films)	color	24m	July 16, 1971	
Using Maps, Measuring Distance	Clarence W. Sorensen	color	11m	November 12, 1962	
Using the Bank	John H. Lewis & John R. Clark	B&W	11m	November 28, 1947	video
Using the Classroom Film		B&W	11m	October 2, 1945	
The USSR Since Gorbachev		color	17m	1992	

== V ==
Title	Major credits	B&W or color	Running time	Year/copyright date	Notes
Vacances En Normandie	Milan Herzog (producer)	B&W	11m	May 2, 1956	
The Van Allen Radiation Belts	James A. Van Allen & Donald A. Boyer	color	17m	August 26, 1963	
Velocity of Chemical Reactions	(ERPI); Hermann Irving Schlesinger	B&W	10m	January 1, 1938	video
Venereal Disease: The Hidden Epidemic	Thomas G. Smith (producer); Walter Smartt & James Miller	color	27m	May 4, 1973	video
Venezuela: Oil Builds a Nation		color	17m	October 11, 1972	video
Venice, Queen of the Adriatic	Clifford J. Kamen (producer); Clarence W Sorenson	color	10m	July 11, 1951	video
Venice: Economic Power in the Middle Ages		color	19m	1992	
Viaje Por El Norte De Espana (Voyage through Northern Spain)	(Producciones Ancora Espana)	color	11m	March 4, 1966	
Viaje Por El Sur De Espana (Voyage through Southern Spain)	(Producciones Ancora Espana)	color	17m	March 4, 1966	
Vibrations	Larry Yust (producer); Stanley Croner & Albert V. Baez; camera: Isidore Mankofsky	color	13m	September 19, 1961	
Vietnam Perspective	Dennis S. Johnson	color	22m	1985	
The Vikings: Life and Conquests	Richard Kaplan (producer); David K. Bjork	color	16m	July 20, 1959	video
El Villano En Su Rincon (The King and the Farmer)	Milan Herzog (producer)	color	3 parts (14m/22m/10m)	October 18, 1965	
Viruses: What They Are and How They Work	Bert Van Bork (producer); Bill Gudmundson; narrator: Kerry Frumkin	color	12m	1988	video
A Visit to the Waterworks	Hal Kopel (producer); Edward A. Krug	B&W	11m	October 23, 1956	video
A Visit with Cowboys	Milan Herzog (producer); J. Frank Dobie	B&W	11m	October 5, 1949	video
Vitamin Perspective	Dennis S. Johnson	color	22m	1985	
Vocal Music	Delinda Roggensack	B&W	11m	October 5, 1950	video
Vocational Opportunities in High School		color	14m	January 30, 1973	
Volcano: Birth of a Mountain	(American Geological Institute); Bert Van Bork & Donald W. Peterson	color	25m	May 11, 1977	video
Volcanoes in Action	(ERPI); Carey Croneis	B&W	10m	October 30, 1935	video
Volcanoes: Exploring the Restless Earth	(American Geological Institute); Bert Van Bork (producer); William H. Matthews	color	18m	September 21, 1973	video
Voltaire Presents "Candide": An Introduction to the Age of Enlightenment	John Barnes & Linda Gottlieb; cast: David Yelland, Mark Dignam, William Squire, Ann Casson & Philip Locke	color	31m	August 4, 1976	Short Story Showcase; video
Voyage to the Galapagos	Bruce Hoffman	color	22m	1983	

== W ==
Title	Major credits	B&W or color	Running time	Year/copyright date	Notes
Wallace Company, Inc.: Case Study No. 3 Empowering People Quality	(National Educational Media); Mike Wright	color	23m	1991	
Walt Whitman: Poet for a New Age	Lou Stomen & Clifton Fadiman; co-writer: Abram D. Murray; cast: Cliff Osmond; narrators: Jack Nicholson & Raymond Massey	color	29m	January 1, 1972	
Warning: Earthquake!	(Reid-Cowan Productions-Avatar Learning); Alan P. Sloan & Matthew N. Herman (producer); Susan Martin; writer: Tony Hudz; camera: Barry Herron; music: Richard de la Salle	color	23m	August 25, 1976	
Washington D.C.	Jerry Haislmaier	color	23m	1984	
Washington Irving	(Emerson Film Corp.); Leon Howard	B&W	19m	September 27, 1949	Famous Men & Women of the World; video
Wastage of Human Resources	(Emerson Film Corp.); Lawrence K. Frank	B&W	11m	December 12, 1947	video
Water and What It Does	Charles L. Finance & Illa Podendorf; camera: Isidore Mankofsky	color	11m	May 30, 1962	video
Water Birds		B&W	11m	December 30, 1944	video
The Water Cycle	Warren P. Everote (producer); S. Ralph Powers; camera: John Walker	B&W	11m	February 3, 1947	
The Water Cycle (2nd edition)	(American Geological Institute); Bert Van Bork & William H. Matthews	color	14m	1979	
Water in the Air	(Radford Pictures)	B&W	11m	March 1, 1949	video
Water Power	(ERPI); George T. Renner Jr.	B&W	10m	October 1, 1937	revised 1946
Water's Edge	Ernst Wildi	color	12m	December 1964	
The Watussi of Africa (Giant Africans)	(ERPI); George Herzog	B&W	10m	January 3, 1939	video
Waves and Energy	Stanley Croner & Albert V. Baez; camera: Isidore Mankofsky	color	11m	August 15, 1961	
Waves on Water	(American Geological Institute); Stanley Croner (producer); Charles F. Finance & John S. Shelton; camera: Isidore Mankofsky	color	15m	February 10, 1965	video
The Ways of Water (Olympic Peninsula of Washington)	Greg Heimer (producer); John S. Shelton	color	13m	June 8, 1971	
The Wearing Away of the Land	(Harvard Film Service); Kirtley F. Mather	B&W	11m	1939	video
The Weather	(ERPI); Harry Wexler	B&W	10m	December 22, 1941	
Weather Forecasting	Miles Harris	color	22m	March 5, 1975	video
Weather Satellites		color	15m	October 4, 1965	
The Web of Life, Pt. I: The Strands Grow	(Conservation Foundation); George Brewer (producer) - John H. Storer & John Walker	color	14m	September 29, 1950	video
The Web of Life, Pt. II: A Strand Breaks	(Conservation Foundation); George Brewer (producer) - John H. Storer	color	16m	September 29, 1950	video
Weed: The Story of Marijuana	(Concept Films); Brian Kellman (producer)	color	24m	March 5, 1971	video
Weight Events	(ERPI); Lawson Robertson	B&W	10m	April 15, 1938	video
Weight Events (2nd edition)	Lawson Robertson, Dean Cromwell & Brutus Hamilton	B&W	11m	June 24, 1946	
Weights and Measures		B&W	14m	May 28, 1954	video
The Well of the Saints, by John M. Synge	Larry Yust & Clifton Fadiman; camera: Isidore Makofsky; cast: Jack Aranson, Peggy Webber, Patrick Campbell, Sean McClory & Judith McGilligan)	color	40m	December 12, 1975	Short Play Showcase; video
West Africa (Nigeria)	Paul Bohannan	color	22m	March 13, 1963	video
The West Indies	William Deneen & Douglas Hall	color	22m	July 6, 1965	
The West Indies		B&W	11m	June 28, 1944	
The Westward Movement	(ERPI)	B&W	10m	October 22, 1941	video
Whales: Can They Be Saved?	(Avatar Learning); Donald R. Patten	color	23m	November 10, 1976	
What Color Are You?	Amram Scheinfeld	color	15m	December 22, 1967	video
What Do You Do While You Wait?	Maclovia Rodriguez	color	11m	July 18, 1973	
What Does Huckleberry Finn Say?	Larry Yust; writer: Clifton Fadiman; camera: Isidore Mankofsky	color	27m	December 15, 1965	
What Is a Bird?	Milan Herzog & John Walker (producer); Kenneth C Parkes	color	16m	June 18, 1962	Biology program, unit 3: Animal life; video
What Is a Fish?		color	22m	1963	Biology program, unit 3: Animal life; video
What Is a Mammal?	Bert Van Bork (producer);	color	14m	July 27, 1962	Biology program, unit 3: Animal life
What Is a Mammal? (2nd edition)	Bert Van Bork (producer); camera: Mike Westphal; animation: David Alexovich	color	15m	1987	video
What Is a Reptile?	John Walker (producer); Bert Van Bork, Karl Patterson Schmidt & Neil D Richmond	color	18m	October 11, 1961	Biology program, unit 3: Animal life; video
What Is a Short Story?	Bert Van Bork & Clifton Fadiman	color	14m	1980	
What Is An Amphibian?	Bert Van Bork (producer); Ralph Buchsbaum	color	11m	February 28, 1962	Biology program, unit 3: Animal life; video
What Is Art?	Paul Burnford	color	6m	August 18, 1954	Art in Action; video
What Is Ecology?	Ralph Buchsbaum	color	11m	January 26, 1962	Biology program, unit 1: Ecology
What Is Ecology? (2nd edition)	Bert Van Bork & Michael V. Wade	color	20m	July 5, 1977	video
What Is Electric Current?	Larry Yust & Albert V. Baez; camera: Isidore Mankofsky	color	13m	August 15, 1961	
What Is Electricity?	(Guild Holdings); O. W. Eshbach	B&W	13m	December 28, 1953	video
What Is Science?	Philip Stockton (producer); Gary Lopez & David J. McGowan; consultants: Lawrence F. Lowery & Alan McCormack; animation: Steve Boyer	color	8m	1988	
What Is Space?	Larry Yust & Albert V. Baez; camera: Isidore Mankofsky	color	10m	September 19, 1961	video
What Is Uniform Motion?	Larry Yust & Albert V. Baez; camera: Isidore Mankofsky	color	12m	July 5, 1961	video
What Makes Clouds?	(American Geological Institute); Stanley Croner (producer); Warren Brown & John S Shelton	color	17m	February 10, 1965	video
What Makes Rain?	(American Geological Institute); William Kay; animation: David Alexovich	color	20m	September 16, 1975	video
What Makes the Wind Blow?	(American Geological Institute); Stanley Croner (producer); Warren Brown	color	16m	March 4, 1965	revised 1987; video
What Makes Weather?	David Jay	color	14m	1981	
What Plants Need for Growth	Milan Herzog (producer); Walter Thurber	color	10m	May 29, 1959	revised 1982
What's Your Authority?	Greg Heimer (producer); Lawrence Kohlberg	color	11m	April 10, 1972	
Whazzat? (Six Blind Men and the Elephant)	(Crocos Productions); Arthur Pierson	color	10m	March 19, 1975	clay animation; video
The Wheat Farmer	(ERPI); H. B. Hartwig	B&W	11m	September 20, 1938	video
The Wheat Farmer (2nd edition)	Nicholas Dancy (producer); H.P. Hartwig	color	13m	February 28, 1956	video
When the Earth Explodes (Volcanoes)	Bert Van Bork (producer)	color	22m	1983	
Where Is Dead?	Jackie Rivett-River (producer); Maria W. Piers	color	19m	September 10, 1975	video
Where's Your Loyalty?	Greg Heimer (producer); Lawrence Kohlberg	color	11m	April 11, 1972	
Which Way Is North?		color	14m	November 2, 1961	
Who Needs Rules?	Greg Heimer (producer); Lawrence Kohlberg	color	11m	April 10, 1972	
Why Did Europe Discover America in 1492?		color	11m	1991	
Why Do Peacocks Have Elaborate Trains?		color	25m	1991	
Why Do We Still Have Mountains?	(American Geological Institute); Stanley Croner (producer); Warren Brown; camera: Isidore Mankofsky	color	20m	June 10, 1964	video
Why Fathers Work	Emilie U. Lepthien	color	14m	July 3, 1969	video
Why Foods Spoil: Molds, Yeasts, Bacteria	Milan Herzog (producer); Wilson G. Smillie	color	14m	July 26, 1957	
Why Mothers Work	William Kay (producer); Elizabeth Janeway	color	17m	April 14, 1976	
Why Not Accounting?	(AWSCPA Educational Corp.)	color	15m	August 11, 1971	
Why Say No to Drugs?	(Chuck Olin Associates); Chuck Olin	color	15m	1986	
Why Seasons Change	(Elettra Films)	color	11m	October 25, 1960	video
Why Vandalism?	Hal Kopel (producer); Bruno Bettelheim	B&W	17m	August 30, 1955	video
Wild Science: Communicating with Animals	Lee Mendelson (producer); Ric Gentry	color	11m	March 18, 1977	
Wild Science: Mind and Body	Lee Mendelson (producer); Ric Gentry; narrator: Peter Falk	color	10m	March 18, 1977	
Wildebeeste	Jane & Peter Chermayeff	color	10m	1984	Silent Safari
William Shakespeare (Shakespeare's Stratford)	John Barnes; writer: Gilbert Aberg; cameramen Michael Livesey; cast: Vaughn Kimber, Richard Coe & Ray Westwell	color	25m	October 26, 1955	video
Wind and What It Does		color	11m	January 23, 1963	
The Wind: The Power and the Promise	(Avatar Learning); Alan P. Sloan (producer); Phil Content	color	13m	1980	
The Winds of Change	David & William Kay	color	22m	1983	
The Wine of the Tetrarch'	John Barnes (producer); John Walker	B&W	27m	May 29, 1959	
The Winged World, Instinct and Intelligence in Birds'	National Geographic Society	color	24m	April 16, 1968	
Winter on the Farm	E. Laurence Palmer	color	11m	July 9, 1948	video
The Wolf and the Seven Kids	(Greatest Tales Inc.); Fred Ladd	color	10m	January 3, 1978	animated cartoon
Women at Work: Change, Choice, Challenge	William Kay (producer); Elizabeth Janeway	color	17m	April 27, 1977	video
Wonder Walks: A Time for Rain	Warren Brown (producer); John S. Shelton & Charles L. Hogue	color	7m	July 12, 1971	
Wonder Walks: A Time for Sun	Warren Brown (producer); John S. Shelton & Charles L. Hogue	color	7m	July 12, 1971	
Wonder Walks: Bending and Reflecting Sunlight	Warren Brown (producer); John S. Shelton & Charles L. Hogue	color	7m	July 12, 1971	
Wonder Walks: How Do They Move?	Warren Brown (producer); John S. Shelton & Charles L. Hogue	color	7m	August 1, 1971	
Wonder Walks: Let's Find Life	Warren Brown (producer); John S. Shelton & Charles L. Hogue	color	10m	June 10, 1971	
Wonder Walks: Some Friendly Insects	Warren Brown (producer); John S. Shelton & Charles L. Hogue	color	7m	June 10, 1971	
Wonder Walks: The World Up Close	Warren Brown (producer); John S. Shelton & Charles L. Hogue	color	7m	July 21, 1971	
Wonder Walks: What Do They Eat?	Warren Brown (producer); John S. Shelton & Charles L. Hogue	color	7m	July 14, 1971	
Wonder Walks: Where Does Life Come From?	Warren Brown (producer); John S. Shelton & Charles L. Hogue	color	7m	June 28, 1971	
Wondering About Air	Paul Buchbinder	color	13m	1986	video (4 minute version)
Wondering About Sound	Paul Buchbinder	color	10m	1986	
Wood - Portable Power Tools: The Circular Saw	(Eothen Films)	color	series of 8mm film loops	1969	
The Woodwind Choir	(ERPI); James Brill, revised with Peter W. Dykema	B&W	10m	December 10, 1930	revised 1938
The Woodwind Choir (2nd edition)	Milan Herzog (producer); Ralph E. Rush; music: Hans Swarowsky & Vienna Symphony	color	11m	September 20, 1956	
Woodworking		B&W	10m	September 3, 1953	video
Woody Woodchuck's Adventure	John Walker (producer); Charles C. Carpenter	color	11m	January 17, 1961	
Wool, from Sheep to Clothing	John Walker, Robert Homer Burns & Alexander Johnston	B&W	11m	November 17, 1947	
The Work of Rivers	(ERPI); Carey Croneis	B&W	10m	October 30, 1935	video
The Work of the Atmosphere	(ERPI); Carey Croneis	B&W	10m	October 30, 1935	video
The Work of the Atmosphere (2nd edition)		B&W	11m	June 11, 1946	
Work of the Blood	George E. Wakerlin	color	13m	June 19, 1957	video (black & white copy)
The Work of the Heart	Charles F. Finance (producer); Forrest H. Adams & Ralph Buchsbaum; camera: Isidore Mankofsky	color	19m	1967	Biology program, unit 4: Physiology
Work of the Heart (2nd edition)	David Alexovich	color	21m	1987	video
The Work of the Kidneys	(ERPI); Anton J. Carlson, H. G. Swann & F. J. Mullin	B&W	10m	September 20, 1940	video
The Work of the Kidneys (2nd edition)	Charles F. Finance & Benjamin H. Barbour	color	20m	January 4, 1973	Biology program, unit 4: Physiology
World Balance of Power	John T. Bobbitt (producer); William T. R. Fox Jr.	B&W	20m	November 24, 1952	
The World of Plant and Animal Communities	Paul Buchbinder	color	13m	1981	
World Trade for Better Living	Clair Wilcox & Eugene Staley	color	17m	August 10, 1951	video
World War I: A Documentary on the Role of the U.S.A.		B&W	28m	July 9, 1957	video
World War II: Prologue, U.S.A.	Hal Kopel (producer); Henry Steele Commager	B&W	28m	September 25, 1956	video
Worms, the Annelida: Leeches, Earthworms, and Sea Worms	William A. Anderson (producer); Lester Ingle & John Walker	color	13m	December 7, 1955	
Writing through the Ages	(Ministry of Education of UK)	B&W	10m	October 18, 1950	video

== X ==
Title	Major credits	B&W or color	Running time	Year/copyright date	Notes
Xth Olympiad Track Events	(ERPI)	B&W	20m	August 13, 1932	

== Y ==
Title	Major credits	B&W or color	Running time	Year/copyright date	Notes
Yeasts and Molds		color	15m	1993	
Yellowstone in Winter	Wolfgang Bayer	color	27m	1983	
Yosemite	(Atwater Kent Foundation); Ted Phillips	color	18m	1952	video
You Are Growing Day By Day	Hugh & Suzanne Johnston (producers); Barbara Wehr	color	8m	1980	
Your Body and Its Parts: Introduction		color	6m	September 15, 1964	Basic Life Science, Your Health
Your Ears		color	6m	September 15, 1964	Basic Life Science, Your Health
Your Ears (2nd edition)	Bruce Hoffman & Jon W. Hisgen	color	11m	1989	
Your Eyes		color	6m	September 15, 1964	Basic Life Science, Your Health
Your Eyes (2nd edition)	Bruce Hoffman & Jon W. Hisgen	color	11m	1989	
Your Food		color	6m	September 15, 1964	Basic Life Science, Your Health
Your Friend, the Forest: Save It or Destroy It	(Conservation Foundation); George Brewer (producer); John H. Storer	color	7m	July 26, 1954	video
Your Friend, the Soil: Keep It or Lose It	(Conservation Foundation); George Brewer (producer); John H. Storer	color	7m	July 26, 1954	video
Your Friend, the Water: Clean or Dirty	(Conservation Foundation); George Brewer (producer); John H. Storer	color	7m	July 26, 1954	video
Your Pets		B&W	11m	February 18, 1948	
Your Protection Against Disease		color	6m	September 15, 1964	Basic Life Science, Your Health
Your Sleep and Rest		color	6m	September 15, 1964	Basic Life Science, Your Health; video
Your Teeth		color	6m	September 15, 1964	Basic Life Science, Your Health
Your Voice	William J. Temple & Delinda Roggensack	B&W	11m	November 16, 1949	video
Yours Is the Land	(Conservation Foundation); George Brewer (producer); John H. Storer	color	11m	January 6, 1950	
Youth Builds a Nation in Tanzania	Brian Kellman (producer)	color	18m	September 11, 1970	
Youth, Maturity, Old Age	(Crocos Productions); John Barnes; camera: Adam Gifford; cast: Marcel Marceau	color	8m	April 1, 1975	Art of Silence; video
Yugoslav Boy: Story of Frane	(Octavian Pictures); Milan Herzog (producer); Niksa Fulgosi	color	16m	January 24, 1968	

== Z ==
Title	Major credits	B&W or color	Running time	Year/copyright date	Notes
Zebra	Jane & Peter Chermayeff	color	11m	1971	Silent Safari, video
Zenith	(Aesop Films); William Van Horn	c	1977	animated cartoon	
The Zoo	Robert Bean	B&W	11m	January 24, 1949	video
The Zoo (2nd edition)	Paul Witty (producer); George Rabb & Paul Buchbinder; narrator: Randy Brill	color	11m	1979	
Zoo Baby Animals (Baby Zoo Animals)	John Walker (producer); Marlin Perkins	color	11m	January 4, 1961	
A Zoo's Eye View Dawn to Dark	Milan Herzog (producer); Charles A. McLaughlin	color	11m	May 25, 1973	
