= Centron =

Centron may refer to:

- a brand name for ormeloxifene
- Centron Corporation, a former industrial and educational film production company
- Centron (weevil), a beetle genus in the tribe Alophini
