= Weisenborn =

Weisenborn is a surname of German origin, originating as a habitational name for someone from any of numerous places named Weissenborn. Notable people with the surname include:

- Clara Weisenborn (1907–1985), American politician
- Gordon Weisenborn (1923–1987), American director, producer, writer, and cinematographer
- Günther Weisenborn (1902–1969), German writer and resistance fighter
- Rudolph Weisenborn (1881–1974), American artist
- Hellmuth Weissenborn (1898–1982), German artist

== See also ==
- Weissenborn, a brand of lap slide guitar
