= Margaret (Trudy) Carlile Travis =

Margaret (Trudy) Carlile Travis (1921-2011) was an American film director and screenwriter of documentaries, and educational, industrial, and sponsored films. She wrote the script for the short film Leo Beuerman, which was nominated for an Academy Award for Best Documentary short in 1970.

== Personal life ==
Travis was born in Collinsville, Oklahoma, and attended Coffeyville Junior College. She had lived in Baltimore and in Waynesville, NC, and worked in defense plants during World War II. She married Kenneth A. Travis, of Coffeyville, in 1941. She and her husband moved to Lawrence, Kansas in 1946. She had three sons. She died in Lawrence in September 2011.

== Career ==
She was one of the first four employees of Centron Corporation in Lawrence from 1947-1985, where she was a motion picture scriptwriter and director, working on a reported but still to be researched almost 100 short educational and commercial films, According to leading scholar of US industrial films Rick Prelinger, Travis was one of relatively few women who worked in the field during this time period.

Many of her pictures for Young America Films pioneered the use of classroom educational films in the 1950s and 1960s. This period was the heyday for films designed to be shown to students on proper behavior.

The film Leo Beuerman on which Travis served as scriptwriter was nominated for an Academy Award for Best Documentary short in 1970. She retired as Centron’s vice president of creative services.

== Filmography ==
- I Like Bikes, But. . . (1978), as co-creator, for General Motors
- Leo Beuerman (1969), as writer
- Showdown! (1958), as writer; "Intended for free showing before civic, fraternal, religious, professional and women's organizations in the state. Showdown! is a documentary-type presentation which stresses the advantages of the proposed amendment in giving individuals freedom of choice as to whether or not they will join any labor union, with "its featured actor Cecil B. deMille, a strong proponent of right-to-work legislation from his personal experiences in the radio-tv field."
- The Case of the Doubting Doctor (1957), as writer; "The doctor's case is specifically that of mythical Dr. Kap Lambert and through his obstinate insistence on finding out exactly how the AMA [sponsor, American Medical Association; runs things, the work of the Association is made plain for viewers within and outside the profession."
- The Last of Grass (1957), as writer, color picture that aims to sell its viewers on the merits of the sponsor's (Monsanto) grassy-weed spray, Randox; a sequel to The Most in Posts
- Let's Try Choral Reading (1957), released by Young America Films, "Several demonstrations of choral reading are given in the film. The readings used are from three unpublished poems by Margaret Carlile Travis. The final sequence is devoted to one of these entitled "Surabachi" using special lighting effects to give the poetry a dramaitic staging."
- Principles of Biology, Set 1 and 2 (1955), as writer, released by Young America Films
- Why Study Science? (1955), as writer, released by Young America Films
- Words of Courtesy (1954), as writer, released by Young America Films
- Health: Your Food (1953), as writer
- Snakes Can Be Interesting (1952), as writer, released by Young America Films
- Sewing: Fitting a Pattern (1951), as writer, released by Young America Films; part of Sewing Series
- A Day of Thanksgiving (1951), as writer; also as Neighbor who borrows a cup of flour
