= Rod Freedman =

Australian documentary filmmaker

Rod Freedman is an Australian documentary filmmaker.

== Early life and education ==
Rod Freedman was born in Botswana and grew up in Johannesburg, South Africa. Freedman's grandparents were all Jewish Lithuanian and his parents were born in South Africa. The family migrated to Australia in 1965.

Freedman attended Vaucluse Boys' High School in Sydney. After completing a Bachelor of Economics at Sydney University, Freedman changed tack and studied film and television production techniques.

== Career ==
Freedman joined Film Australia as a production assistant, where he learnt about the Australian film industry as he worked on a wide variety of films in various roles. Inspired by the Challenge for Change program at the National Film Board of Canada which used video as a tool for social change, Freedman helped to start Film Australia's first video production unit.

He then travelled for five years in Europe, North Africa, and the Middle East, including working as a teacher for two years in Southern Sudan.

Returning to Australia in 1985, Freedman helped form Summer Hill Films, specialising in discussion-starter videos known as trigger films. In 1998, Freedman and his partner Lesley Seebold formed Change Focus Media to produce corporate videos and TV documentaries.

Freedman's personal film about his Lithuanian great uncle, Uncle Chatzkel (1999, SBS), had two AFI Award nominations and screened in many film festivals. One Last Chance (2000, SBS), about a Lithuanian war criminal, won three awards in the US.

He initiated and produced the Tudawali Award-winning series, Everyday Brave (2002, SBS), working with emerging Aboriginal directors to tell stories of unknown Aboriginal people who have made a difference to their communities.

Freedman co-produced Welcome to the Waks Family (2003, SBS) about an orthodox Jewish family with 17 children. After this he produced and directed three series of Australian Biography (2003–2008, SBS), featuring significant Australians reflecting on their lives. He produced Crossing the Line (2005, ABC) about two medical students working in a remote Aboriginal community (Best Documentary Social and Political Issues, ATOM Awards and other awards).

He returned to South Africa in 2004 as producer/director of Wrong Side of the Bus (2010, ABC), which screened in Australia, USA, Canada, Israel, UK, and South Africa, and won Best African Documentary, International Film Festival South Africa.

Freedman was producer of the 2014 feature documentary Once My Mother, directed by Sophia Turkiewicz. Robert Connolly was associate producer in Australia. The film won multiple Australian and international awards.

== Production company ==
Freedman's partner is Lesley Seebold, and they run Change Focus Media, established in 1977. It is located in Balmain, Sydney.
