= Centron Corporation =

Defunct American education company and distributor (1947-1994)

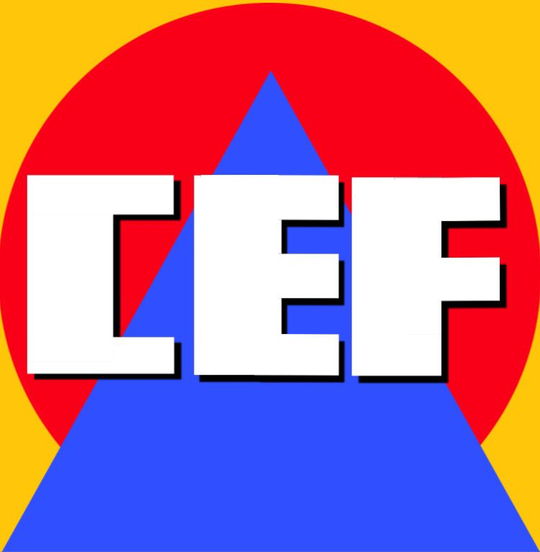
- Type: Private
- Industry: Educational Film Distribution
- Founded: 1947; 79 years ago
- Founder: Arthur H. Wolf; Russell A. Mosser
- Defunct: 1994; 32 years ago
- Fate: Sold to The University of Kansas
- Headquarters: Lawrence, Kansas, United States
- Owner: Coronet Films (1981–1984); University of Kansas (1991–1994)

Centron Corporation was an American industrial and educational film production company, that specialized in classroom and corporate 16mm films and VHS videocassettes. A slightly smaller company than its contemporaries such as Encyclopædia Britannica Films, Coronet Films and Learning Corporation of America, it operated from 1947 until 1994, gaining added fame with the Academy Award-nominated Leo Beuerman in 1969.

== Overview ==
Analyzing Advertising (1973) by Centron Educational

Founded in 1947 in Lawrence, Kansas, by boyhood friends Arthur H. Wolf, a veteran of Calvin Films, another Kansas film company, and Russell A. Mosser of Boeing-Wichita. The name was chosen to incorporate the key words "central", given that the company was located in the center of the United States, and "electronic" in honor of the "electronic age of the future".

Centron successfully competed with large companies on both coasts, and was widely known for its high quality films, coming in on time and under budget. The company kept afloat for decades making many technical instructions, cooking and sewing demonstrations, teacher aides and safety reels. It added some social guidance films in the 1950s to compete with Coronet Films, along with zoological and geographic topics that held stronger interest among school students.

Harold "Herk" Harvey was a principal director at Centron. His 1962 feature Carnival of Souls was produced with several people associated with Centron. John Clifford, a Centron screenwriter, wrote the script for Carnival of Souls.

One of his most popular educational series covered the land and people "south of the border", as the Middle America Regional Geography and La América del Sur series. Scripted by Peter Schnitzler and shot in many locations by cameraman Bob Rose, they were made under some political difficulties for that time. At one point, the series almost had to exclude Chile when government officials initially prevented film stock from leaving the country.

One of Centon's most prolific scriptwriters was Margaret (Trudy) Carlile Travis, and Linda K. (Sam) Haskins also wrote and directed, two of the relatively few women working in the sponsored film industry.

It was during this period that the company expanded its distribution of outside productions, including a number of National Film Board of Canada titles. The 1970s was a particularly golden age for nature documentaries, especially the Elementary Natural Science series of the team of Karl and Stephen Maslowski.

In 1981, Wolf and Mosser sold Centron to the Coronet division of Esquire, Inc. Production carried on, mostly in Illinois, under the Coronet banner for a few years with Bob Kohl as primary head. In 1984, the Gulf and Western Industries conglomerate took over the mother company and, in a swift move, Kohl successfully purchased Centron from Gulf and moved production back to Lawrence, Kansas.

After continuing through to the end of the 1980s, including a series of instructional films for Encyclopædia Britannica, Kohl sold the company facilities to the University of Kansas in 1991, with the library of post-1984 films added to their archive by the time the company folded in 1994. Today, The Phoenix Learning Group has distribution rights to the Coronet library, including most of Centron's pre-1981 catalogue.

== Legacy ==
Centron won many awards for its films, the most famous being the Oscar nominated Leo Beuerman. This simple profile of a short handicapped man with his tractor in downtown Lawrence was produced on a budget of $12,000 and eventually became one of the most popular classroom films of all time, selling an impressive 2,300 prints.

Some of their films were satirized on the cult TV series Mystery Science Theater 3000, including Cheating, Why Study Industrial Arts? and What About Juvenile Delinquency?, each directed by Herk Harvey.

== List of films ==
This list is incomplete; you can help by expanding it.

Title	Major credits	black & white or color (& running time)	year / copyright date	Notes
AC - You Have a Part in It	(General Motors)	c-19m	1980	
AC Adventure 70	(AC Sparkplug); writer: John Clifford	c-23m	1970	
The Age of Exploration and Expansion		c-17m	© February 1, 1971	European History
AgriAmerica 2003 AD	(Production Credit Associations of America)	c-19m	1983	
Aids to Speaking	Will A. Linkugel	c-15m	1979	Art of Communication; video
Airplanes and How They Fly	(Young America Films)	bw-10m	© October 26, 1950	
Airplanes and How They Fly (updated)	William S. LaShier Jr.	c-14m	1967	
Alaska: America's Northern Frontier	(McGraw-Hill)	c-16m	© August 31, 1965	United States Geography
All My Tomorrows	Gordon-kerchoff Productions	c-20m	1979	Drugs and alcohol causing brain damage to a teenage girl
The American Phoenix		c-20m	© September 2, 1975	
Americana: The Rural Telephone		c-15m	© May 17, 1974	
Analyzing Advertising	Nancy L. Garland	c-13m	© October 3, 1973	video
And Women Must Weep!	(National Right to Work Committee)	c-24m	1962	
Animal Babies Grow Up	(Coronet Films); advisors: Dennis A, Merritt & Sheryle M. Roche	c-10m	1983	
Animals and Their Homes		c-10m	© December 31, 1957, revised 1978	
Animals of Africa	Karl & Peter Maslowski	c-12m	1978	Elementary Natural Science; video
Animals of Australia		c-20m	1979	Elementary Natural Science; video
Animals of North America	Karl & Peter Maslowski	c-12m	1979	Elementary Natural Science; video
Animals of South America	(Chatsworth Film); writer: Michael Boorer	c-17m	1980	
Animals of the Arctic	Karl & Peter Maslowski	c-16m	1979	Elementary Natural Science; video
Animals Through the Winter	(McGraw-Hill)	c-11m	© January 16, 1958	
Argentina	(McGraw-Hill); Harold "Herk" Harvey; writer: Peter Schnitzer; camera: Bob Rose	c-16m	© December 29, 1961	Visitas a La América Del Sur
Are You Really Listening?	(Encyclopædia Britannica Films); Robert Kohl (producer)	c-14m	1987	Managing People Problems
Art of the Persian Carpet	Paul Shaper	c-13m	© September 16, 1975	
Athletes At Risk	Robert Kohl (producer); David Cook & Ray Tricker	c-15m	1988	Drugs and the College Athlete
The Avatex Story	(Monsanto Chemical)	bw-15m	1961	
Avoiding Slips, Trips and Falls	(Encyclopædia Britannica Films); Donald L. Leonard (producer); Charles M. Weber & John M. Sanger	c-10m	1990	Safety in the Work Place
Baby Birds and Their Parents	Karl & Peter Maslowski	c-11m	1981	Elementary Natural Science
Bali: Isle of Temples		c-27m	1973	
Bananas: Gold From the Tropics		c-10m	© November 11, 1969	
Basic Breadmaking		c-20m	1981	Cooking and Baking Skills
Basic Hand Tools: Screwdrivers, Hammers, Pliers, Wrenches		c-10m	1982	
Becoming a Pro on the Phone	(Coronet Films); Joel Marks (producer); Lillian Spina; production manager: Rachel Goodstein	c-13m	1983	Telemarketing
Beef: The Steak in the Grass	(Iowa Beef Industry Council)	c-11m	© November 1, 1973	
The Best You Possible		c-14m	1981	
Bicycle Safety		bw-10m	© August 31, 1950	video
Bicycle Safety: The Rules of the Road		c-12m	© November 18, 1976	video
Bidding Your Money Hello	(Caterpillar Inc.)	c-21m	1982	
Bike-wise, To Be Sure		c-15m	© October 21, 1974	
Brazil	(McGraw-Hill); Harold "Herk" Harvey; writer: Peter Schnitzer; camera: Bob Rose	c-16m	© December 29, 1961	Visitas a La América Del Sur
Budgeting Personal Income		c-18m	1981	Personal Finances and Effective Consumership
The Bully	(Young America Films)	bw-11m	© December 28, 1951	Discussion Problems in Group Living; video
But We Don't Have a Contract	(Caterpillar Inc.); Maurice Prather; writer: Margaret Travis	bw-20m	1959	
Cakes: Basic Techniques		c-20m	1981	Cooking and Baking Skills
Cargoes on the Move	(American Iron & Steel Institute); Douglas Poulter; writer: Trudy Travis	c-10m	1983	
Caring for Your Toys	(Young America Films); Margaret C. Travis	bw-13m	© July 12, 1954	
Caught in a Rip-Off	writer, director: Margaret "Trudy" Travis; original music, narration: Jim Stringer	c-15m	© November 1, 1974	
Cave Ecology	James L. Koevenig & Mrs. Sue Hall (advisors)	c-13m	© December 1, 1970	video
Central America: The Coastal Lowlands	(McGraw-Hill); Harold "Herk" Harvey; writer: Peter Schnitzer; camera: Bob Rose	c-19m	© December 31, 1964	Middle America Regional Geography
Central America: The Crowded Highlands	(McGraw-Hill); Harold "Herk" Harvey; writer: Peter Schnitzer; camera: Bob Rose	c-19m	© December 31, 1964	Middle America Regional Geography
Central Farming Region: Food for a Nation	(McGraw-Hill); Clyde F. Kohn	c-19m	© May 21, 1963	United States Geography
Chain Saw Safety	(Outdoor Power Equipment Institute)	c-18m	1981	
Characters in Conflict	John W. Clifford	c-13m	1972	Creative Writing
Cheating	(Young America Films)	bw-12m	© January 30, 1952	Discussion Problems in Group Living; featured on an episode of Mystery Science Theater 3000; video
Chemical Change	(McGraw-Hill)	c-12m	1958	
Chemistry in Nature	(Education Media Australia); Takashi Ino, Shiro Takagi & Shin Muto	c-15m	1974	
The Chess Game	Erik Wright	c-7m	1971	
Children of the Fort	(McGraw-Hill)	c-17m	© April 30, 1968	Children of American History
Children of the Wagon Train	(McGraw-Hill)	bw-18m	© September 7, 1960	Children of American History
Chile	(McGraw-Hill); Harold "Herk" Harvey; writer: Peter Schnitzer; camera: Bob Rose	c-16m	© December 29, 1961	Visitas a La América Del Sur
Cindy Goes to a Party	(Young America Films)	bw-20m	© November 1, 1955	video
The Circulatory System	(Seabourne Enterprises); Donald Walton	c-7m	1972	Basic Anatomy and Physiology of the Mammal
A Citizen Makes a Decision	(Young America Films)	bw-18m	© June 2, 1954	video
A Citizen Participates	(Young America Films); Arthur H. Wolf	bw-26m	© August 5, 1953	video
The Climber	(General Motors); director, editor: James Pearce; script: Trudy Travis; camera: John English; original music: Jim Stringer	c-25m	ca. 1975	
Coal: The Rock That Burns	William C. Mauk, script	c-14m	© August 23, 1976	
Coffee Production in Latin America		c-10m	© January 25, 1969, revised 1976	
Coins of the World	Clain Stefanneli & James E. Seaver	c-13m	© October 19, 1976	
Colan, Semicolan and Quotation Marks	Betty Child	c-14m	© October 25, 1977	Fearless Punctuation
Colombia	(McGraw-Hill); Harold "Herk" Harvey; writer: Peter Schnitzer; camera: Bob Rose	c-16m	© December 29, 1961	Visitas a La América Del Sur
Communication By Voice and Action	E. Christian Buehler & Will A. Linkugel	c-14m	© November 19, 1969	Art of Communication
Community Helpers: Overview		c-11m	1980	Community Helpers
The Compass	(Young America Films & (McGraw-Hill)	c-16m	© June 7, 1960	
Controlling the Collector	(Coronet Films); Joel Marks (producer); Lillian Spina; production manager: Rachel Goodstein	c-17m	1985	Telemarketing
Cooking: Kitchen Safety	Charles E. Lacey & Edna A. Hill	bw-11m	© September 28, 1949	
Cooking: Measuring	Arthur H. Wolf & Edna A. Hill	bw-11m	© May 2, 1949	
Cooking: Planning and Organization	Arthur H. Wolf & Edna A. Hill	bw-11m	© April 11, 1949	
Cooking: Terms and What They Mean	Charles E. Lacey & Edna A. Hill	bw-11m	© September 22, 1949	video
Corn: The Plants with Ears	Donald G. Woolley	c-11m	1972	
The Crusades: 1095-1291		c-16m	© November 11, 1969	European History
Customer Services, a Backup Sales Force	(Coronet Films)	c-14m	1983	Telemarketing
Dairy Products: From Moo to You	Neil A. Jorgensen	c-14m	© October 28, 1975	
Dance, Little Children	(Kansas Board of Health); Harold "Herk" Harvey; writer: Margaret Travis; cast: Leonard Belove, Maurice Copeland & Tom McGinnis	bw-20m	1961	
Danish Farm Family	(McGraw-Hill)	c-16m	© April 19, 1967	
A Day of Thanksgiving		bw-13m	© April 20, 1951	video
The Day That Sang and Cried	Dale Smallin	c-29m	1968	
Days of the Week	(Encyclopædia Britannica Films); consultants: Carol Elsholz & Jane Polcyn	c-5m	1988	First Things First: Early Literacy Skills
The Dealer's Choice	Maurice Prather; writer: Margaret Travis	bw-14m	1960	
Dealing with Criticism	Arthur H. Thomas & Edward J. Heck; script: John Clifford	c-11m	© August 27, 1975	Handling Information At a Personal Level
Dealing with Customer Objections	(Coronet Films); script: John Clifford	c-17m	1984	Telemarketing
Dealing with Different Personalities	(Encyclopædia Britannica Films); Robert Kohl (producer)	c-14m	1987	Managing People Problems
Dealing with the Unexpected	Arthur H. Thomas & Edward J. Heck; script: John Clifford	c-11m	© August 27, 1975	Handling Information At a Personal Level
Deciding	Nancy L. Garland	c-14m	© February 7, 1973	
A Different River	(U.S. Army Corps of Engineers)	c-20m	1982	
The Digestive System	(Seabourne Enterprises); Donald Walton	c-7m	1972	Basic Anatomy and Physiology of the Mammal
Drawing Conclusions Is a Tricky Art	Arthur H. Thomas & Edward J. Heck; script: John Clifford	c-11m	© August 27, 1975	Handling Information At a Personal Level
Drinking Driver: What Can You Do?		c-13m	© November 29, 1977	
Drugs and Athletic Performance	Robert Kohl (producer); David Cook & Ray Tricker	c-15m	1988	Drugs and the College Athlete
Ears: Have You Heard the Latest?	Ann Schaechtele Ailor	c-11m	1981	
Eastern Cottontail	Karl & Peter Maslowski	c-11m	© February 3, 1976	Elementary Natural Science
Economic Stability: The Quest and the Questions	(American Bankers Association)	c-23m	© October 1, 1970	
Egypt: Gift of the Nile	(Chatsworth Film); narrator: Anthony Quayle	c-27m	1973	People & Places of Antiquity
Electric Currents and Circuits	(Coronet Films)	c-14m	1985	The Physical Sciences; video clip
Electrical Safety	George W. Eiche & David L. Little	c-13m	© February 17, 1976	
Electricity and Magnetism	(Coronet Films)	c-14m	1985	The Physical Sciences
The Emerging Eskimo	(Brayton-Kendall); Niilo Koponen & Yutaka Okamoto	c-15m	1972	
Energy and Living Things	(Cinema Associate); James L. Koevenig & Sue Hall	c-11m	1971	Basic Biology
Energy Seekers	(American Iron & Steel Institute)	c-12m	1980	
Engagement: Romance and Reality	(McGraw-Hill); Paul H. Landis	c-15m	© December 31, 1964	Marriage and Family Living Series
Engineering Investigation of 620 Oil Cooler Outlet Design	(Cessna); writer: John Clifford	c-23m	1972	
Engineering Investigation of T-37 Stalls and Spins	(Cessna); writer: John Clifford	c-23m	1972	
Environmental Enrichment: What You Can Do About It	William Stapp & W. Augustus Rentsch	c-21m	1972	
European Culture Region: Its People At Work	(McGraw-Hill)	c-23m	© November 7, 1966	Modern Europe Geography
Everything Rides on Roads	(Caterpillar Inc.)	c-27m	1978	
Eyes: Seeing the Light	Ann Schaechtele Ailor	c-11m	1981	
The Face of Korea	Tere Lee & Chae Jin Lee	c-23m	1979	
Fences and Gates	(General Motors); director: James Pearce; script: Trudy Travis; original music: Jim Stringer and Tide	c-25m	1973	video
Fire Safety Is Your Problem	(Young America Films)	bw-10m	© April 15, 1957	
Fire Safety Is Your Problem (updated)	Nicholas G. Tacinas	c-16m	© October 3, 1975	
Firefighters		c-11m	1980	Community Helpers
Fish: The Food with a Catch		c-12m	© February 10, 1978	
France: New Horizons	(McGraw-Hill)	c-20m	© November 7, 1966	Modern Europe Geography
Frogs and Toads	(Young America Films)	bw-10m	© August 1, 1956	
George Tackles the Land	(Spencer Chemical Company); Harold "Herk" Harvey; writer: Margaret Travis) bw-10m	Billy Barty, Frances Feist & Dan Palmquest	1954	
Getting a Pro on Your Side	(Caterpillar Inc.); Maurice Prather; writer: Margaret Travis	bw-23m	1957	
Getting Ideas to Write About	(Coronet Films); advisor: John R. Searles) c-10m	Effective Writing	1983	
Getting the Order	(Coronet Films); Joel Marks (producer); Lillian Spina; production manager: Rachel Goodstein	c-17m	1984	Telemarketing
Gettysburg: 1863	James Whitefield	c-27m	© March 13, 1974	
Gone with the Antennas	(Coleman Film Productions);Erik Wright	c-5m	1971	
The Good Loser	(Young America Films); Arthur H. Wolf	bw-14m	© November 1, 1953	Discussion Problems in Group Living; video
Goodbye Lynn		c-21m	1972	
The Gossip	(Young America Films)	bw-11m	© June 23, 1955	Discussion Problems in Group Living; video
Grassland Ecology: Habitats and Change	(Cinema Associate); James L. Koevenig & Sue Hall	c-13m	© December 1, 1970	Basic Biology
The Gray Squirrel's Neighborhood	Karl & Peter Maslowski	c-11m	© February 17, 1978	Elementary Natural Science
The Great Lakes Area: Men, Minerals and Machines	(McGraw-Hill); Clyde F. Kohn	c-19m	© May 21, 1963	United States Geography
Greece: So Rich, So Poor	(McGraw-Hill)	c-20m	© November 7, 1966	Modern Europe Geography
The Griper	(Young America Films) Harold Harvey	bw-12m	© April 1, 1954	Discussion Problems in Group Living; video
Growing Up on the Farm Today		c-16m	1972	Real World
The Gulf Coast Region: The South's Land of Opportunity	(McGraw-Hill); Clyde F. Kohn	c-15m	© May 21, 1963	United States Geography
Gulp and Glee! Science and Roller Coasters	Robert D. Townsend	c-13m	© March 25, 1977	
Halloween Safety	adviser: Richard C. Clement	c-11m	© May 20, 1977	videoes 1 & 2
Halloween Safety (updated)	(Coronet Films); advisor: W. Roland Olin	c-14m	1985	video
Handling Dangerous Chemicals: Acids	Clark E. Bricker	c-9m	© May 1, 1970	Fundamentals of Chemistry
Handling Dangerous Chemicals: Bases	Clark E. Bricker	c-9m	© May 1, 1970	Fundamentals of Chemistry
Handling Fire Extinguishers	(Encyclopædia Britannica Films); Robert Kohl (producer); Ralph Mizia; writer: Andrea Warren; consultant: Vernon Speiser	c-13m	1990	Safety in the Work Place (series 2)
Handling Marital Conflicts	(McGraw-Hill); Paul H. Landis	c-15m	© December 31, 1964	Marriage and Family Living Series; (BW version) video
Harvest	(American Iron & Steel Institute)	c-8m	1977	
Hawaii: America's Tropical State	(McGraw-Hill)	c-16m	© August 31, 1965	United States Geography
Hawks	Karl & Peter Maslowski	c-13m	© May 27, 1977	Elementary Natural Science
Health: Your Cleanliness	writer: Margaret Travis	bw-10m	July 1953	
Health: Your Clothing	Harold "Herk" Harvey; writer: Margaret Travis; narrator: Arden Booth	bw-12m	July 1953	
Health: Your Food	(Young America Films) Margaret Carlile Travis	bw-18m	© November 1, 1953	video
Health: Your Posture	(Young America Films)	bw-11+m	© November 24, 1953	video
Heat and Energy Transfer	(Coronet Films); Douglas L. Liebman; advisor: John Davik	c-14m	1985	The Physical Sciences
Heat, Temperature and the Properties of Matter	(Coronet Films)	c-17m	1985	The Physical Sciences
Henry Moore: Art and the Art of Living		c-12m	© January 22, 1976	
Henry Moore: Master Sculptor		c-24m	January 1976	1977 CINE Golden Eagle Award
Holding Them Spellbound	John W. Clifford	c-17m	1972	Creative Writing
Holding Them Spellbound	(Coronet Films); advisor: John R. Searles	c-11m	1983	Effective Writing; 2nd edition of a 1972 title
Home for Christmas		c-11m	1981	
Home Management: Buying Food		bw-11m	© January 3, 1950	video
Home Management: Why Budget?		bw-11m	© March 31, 1950	
Home Safety: It's Up to You		c-12m	© October 13, 1976	
The House of Accidents	Robert L. Marshall & Robert L. Baldwin	c-16m	© November 18, 1977	
How Animals Help Us	(Young America Films)	bw-10m	© January 4, 1957	
How Long Does It Take?	(Encyclopædia Britannica Films); consultants: Carol Elsholz & Jane Polcyn	c-5m	1988	First Things First: Early Literacy Skills
How Plants Help Us	(Young America Films)	bw-10m	© January 4, 1957	
How Plants Reproduce	(Young America Films)	bw-10m	© January 4, 1957	
How Seeds Are Scattered	(Young America Films & McGraw-Hill)	c-11m	© November 18, 1957	
How Things Dissolve	(McGraw-Hill)	c-16m	© January 9, 1969	
How to Conduct a Meeting	E. Christian Buehler & Will A. Linkugel	c-12m	© November 19, 1969	Art of Communication; video
How to Read a Book	(Coronet Films); Mel Waskins	c-14m	1984	video
How to Say "Good Buy"		c-18m	1981	Personal Finances and Effective Consumership
How to Succeed in School	(Young America Films)	bw-10m	© February 20, 1956	
How to Take a Test	(Young America Films)	bw-10+m	© August 20, 1956	video
I Like Bikes... But	(General Motors); Bob Deaton, Loren Dolezal, Dennis Hess, Oscar Rojas, Robert Rose, Trudy Travis, Jim Stringer	c-14m	1978	
Ice Harvest	(John Deere); Ken Boltz; writer: Trudy Travis; original music: Jim Stringer	c-6m	1985	
If You Knew How I Feel: Brad's Learning Disability	(Coronet Films)	c-18m	1982	video
If You Knew How I Feel: Jana and the Crowing Hen	(Coronet Films)	c-16m	1983	
If You Knew How I Feel: Scott's Old Friend	(Coronet Films)	c-22m	1983	
Improving Your Worth	(Caterpillar Inc.); Harold Harvey; writer: John Clifford	c-19m	1983	
Industrial Arts - A Safe Shop	(Young America Films); Charles E. Lacey	bw-12m	© February 28, 1955	video
Industrial Arts - Boring and Drilling Tools	(Young America Films); Charles E. Lacey	bw-12m	© April 4, 1954	
Industrial Arts - Chisel and Gouges	(Young America Films); Charles E. Lacey	bw-13m	© March 1, 1954	
Industrial Arts - Hand Saws	(Young America Films); Charles E. Lacey	bw-9m	© April 15, 1953	
Industrial Arts - Joining and Gluing	(Young America Films); Charles E. Lacey	bw-10m	© April 26, 1956	
Industrial Arts - Planes	(Young America Films); Charles E. Lacey	bw-12m	© April 15, 1953	
Industrial Arts - Using Nails and Screws	(Young America Films); Charles E. Lacey	bw-13m	© June 1, 1953	
Industrial Arts - Wood Furnishings	(Young America Films); Charles E. Lacey	bw-11m	© February 20, 1956	
The Innocent Party	(Kansas State Board of Health)	c-12m	© May 22, 1959	video
The Innovator: Producing Powerful Ideas	(Encyclopædia Britannica Films); Robert Kohl (producer); Timothy Rebman; script: John Clifford	c-23m	1988	Handling Creativity
Insect Life Cycles	Karl & Peter Maslowski	c-15m	1980	Elementary Natural Science; video clip
Internal Theft: Stealing on the Job	(Coronet Films); Linda Haskins; writer: John Clifford; camera: John English	c-16m	1982	
Into the World	Starring Don Johnson A Centron Production Presented by the National Merit Scholarship Corp In Corporation with the Sears-Roebuck Foundation	c- 27m	1968	Don Johnson's film debut while attending the University of Kansas.
Iran: Landmarks in the Desert	(Chatsworth Film); narrator: Anthony Quayle	c-27m	1973	People & Places of Antiquity
Iraq: Stairway to the Gods	(Chatsworth Film); narrator: Anthony Quayle	c-27m	1973	People & Places of Antiquity
Italian Farm Family	(McGraw-Hill)	c-16m	© December 30, 1966	Modern Europe Geography
The Italian Renaissance: Its Mind and Its Soul	Amerose Saricks & Jeff Weinberg	c-14m	1971	European History
Italy: Progress Amidst the Past	(McGraw-Hill)	c-20m	© November 7, 1966	Modern Europe Geography
It's a Thought		c-22m	1980	
It's All Music	(Cinema Associate)	c-26m	1970	
It's Up To Laurie		c-21m	1979	video
Jamaica, Haiti and the Lesser Antilles	(McGraw-Hill); Harold "Herk" Harvey; writer: Peter Schnitzer; camera: Bob Rose	c-19m	© December 31, 1964	Middle America Regional Geography
Janie Sue and Tugaloo	Douglas MacDonald	c-10m	© May 1, 1971	Real World
The Job Interview Pro-Bowl	Will A. Linkugel	c-13m	1979	Art of Communication
Jobs in the City: Construction	Douglas MacDonald	c-9m	© June 1, 1971	Real World
Jobs in the City: Distribution	Douglas MacDonald	c-9m	© March 1, 1971	Real World
Jobs in the City: Distribution	Douglas MacDonald	c-9m	1971	Real World
Jobs in the City: Manufacturing	Douglas MacDonald	c-11m	1972	Real World
Jobs in the City: Mass Media	Douglas MacDonald	c-11m	1972	Real World
Jobs in the City: Medical and Health	Douglas MacDonald	c-14m	1972	Real World
Jobs in the City: Services	Douglas MacDonald	c-11m	1972	Real World
Jobs in the City: Women At Work	Douglas MacDonald	c-11m	1972	Real World
John's Train		c-13m	1972	
Keeping Your Mind on the Job	(Coronet Films); Douglas Poulter; writer: John Clifford	c-13m	1982	
Knowing Woods and Their Uses		bw-10m	© December 27, 1957	
Korea, Ancient Culture, Modern Spirit	(Korea National Tourism Corp.); Han'guk Kwan'gwang Kongsa	c-20m	1987	
Korea: Overview	Harold "Herk" Harvey; writer: John Clifford	c-10m	1980	
Korea: Performing Arts, the Wonderful World of Kim Dung Hee	Tere Lee & George M. Beckmann	c-19m	1979	
Korea: Rich Heritage, Land of Morning Calm	Tere Lee & George M. Beckmann	c-19m	1979	video
Korea: The Circle of Life	Tere Lee & George M. Beckmann	c-19m	1979	
Korea: The Family	Tere Lee & Chae Jin Lee	c-23m	1980	
La Feria: Regocijo De Sevilla	(McGraw-Hill); Robert Lado	c-12m	© March 30, 1967	Modern Europe Geography
Lakes: Aging and Pollution	(Cinema Associate); James L. Koevenig & Sue Hall	c-15m	© January 1, 1971	Basic Biology
The Leader: Encouraging Team Creativity	(Encyclopædia Britannica Films); Robert Kohl (producer); Timothy Rebman; script: John Clifford	c-23m	1988	Handling Creativity
Learning to Look At Hands	(McGraw-Hill)	c-8m	© April 29, 1959	
Leo Beuerman	director: Gene Boomer; writer: Margaret "Trudy" Travis	c-13m	© May 1, 1969	Academy Award for Best Documentary (Short Subject); video
Let's Try Choral Reading	(Young America Films)	bw-10m	© April 12, 1957	
Letters A-Z	(Encyclopædia Britannica Films); consultants: Carol Elsholz & Jane Polcyn	c-6m	1988	First Things First: Early Literacy Skills
Life Force	(Farm Bank Services)	c-24m	1982	video
A Life to Save	(American Medical Association); Harold "Herk" Harvey; writer: Margaret Travis; narrator: Arden Booth; cast: Frances Feist, Art Ellison & Shelby Stork	bw-10m	May 1954	
Light and Images	(Coronet Films); Joel Marks (producer); Mel Waskin; designer: Ellen Bowen	c-11m	1986	The Physical Sciences
Light and Its Story		c-14m	1961	
Light and the Electromagnetic Spectrum	(Coronet Films)	c-14m	1986	The Physical Sciences
Light, Color & the Visible Spectrum	(Coronet Films); Mel Waskin	c-13m	1986	The Physical Sciences
The Low Countries: Very Much Alive	(McGraw-Hill)	c-18m	© November 7, 1966	Modern Europe Geography
Lugano, Switzerland	(Young America Films)	bw-12m	© November 1, 1953	
The Lunatic (VD)	original music: Jim Stringer	c-10m	1972	
The Magic Moth		c-22m	© February 12, 1976	
The Maharajahs	(Chatsworth Film)	c-27m	1973	People & Places of Antiquity
Majority Minority		c-23m	© December 5, 1974	
Make Your Home Safe	(Young America Films)	bw-11m	© May 10, 1957	
Manners in Public	(Young America Films & McGraw-Hill)	c-12m	© April 9, 1959	
Manners in School	(Young America Films & McGraw-Hill)	bw-13m	© January 9, 1959	video
Many Hear, Some Listen	Arthur H. Thomas & Edward J. Heck	c-11m	© August 27, 1975	Handling Information At a Personal Level
Maria of the Pueblos	(Coleman Film Enterprises); J. Donald McIntyre	c-15m	© March 1, 1971	Native American Indians Today
Matter into Energy	(McGraw-Hill)	c-9m	© October 25, 1968	video
Me	James Stachowiak	c-17m	1972	
Meal Planning and Preparation		c-20m	1981	Cooking and Baking Skills
Meat Cookery		c-20m	1981	Cooking and Baking Skills
Medical and Health Workers		c-11m	1980	Community Helpers
Metal Shop Safety	(Young America Films & McGraw-Hill)	bw-17m	© April 22, 1959	
Mexico: Central and Gulf Coast	(McGraw-Hill); Harold "Herk" Harvey; writer: Peter Schnitzer; camera: Bob Rose	c-19m	© December 31, 1964	Middle America Regional Geography
Mexico: Northern and Southern Regions	(McGraw-Hill); Harold "Herk" Harvey; writer: Peter Schnitzer; camera: Bob Rose	c-17m	© December 31, 1964	Middle America Regional Geography
Microphone Speaking	E. Christian Buehler & Will A. Linkugel	c-15m	© November 21, 1969	Art of Communication
The Microscope and Its Use	Arthur H. Wolf	c-9m	© December 31, 1948	(BW version) video
The Middle Atlantic Seaboard Region: Great Cities, Megalopolis	(McGraw-Hill); Clyde F. Kohn	c-16m	© May 21, 1963	United States Geography
Minor Electrical Repairs of Small Appliances	Georg Owen	c-21m	1981	Home Repairs; video
The Mischievous Marks	Betty Child	c-15m	© September 30, 1977	Fearless Punctuation
Mission Nutrition	(Astra Films)	c-15m	1976	
Modern Engines and Energy Conversion	(McGraw-Hill)	c-11m	© January 9, 1969	
Money, Taxes and Imagination	(H & R Block)	c-19m	© August 5, 1976	
The Monster	Arthur H. Wolf	c-15m	© November 9, 1976	
Motivating Employees: Trapped on a Plateau	(Encyclopædia Britannica Films); Robert Kohl (producer)	c-14m	1987	Managing People Problems
Motorcycle Safety and Courtesy in Traffic	James Newman	c-23m	© October 3, 1973	
Musical Forms: The Canon	writer: B. Eugene Koskey	c-18m	© May 19, 1978	
Musical Forms: The Fugue	writer: B. Eugene Koskey	c-19m	© February 3, 1976	
Navajo Boy: The Summer of Johnson Holiday	(Coleman Film Productions)	c-12m	© May 1, 1971	Native American Indians Today
Navajos of the 70s	(Coleman Film Enterprises); J. Donald McIntyre	c-15m	© June 30, 1971	Native American Indians Today
The Nervous System	(Seabourne Enterprises); Donald Walton	c-7m	1972	Basic Anatomy and Physiology of the Mammal
New Breed of Deere	(John Deere); Maurice Prather; writer: Margaret Travis	bw-17m	1959	
A New England Fall Folio	(Maupintour Travel Services); Linda Haskins; script: Trudy Travis	c (video)-27m	1984	
No Deposit, No Return	cast: Edward Morgan, Buffy Sainte-Marie, Mark Van Doren & Kim Hunter	c-10m	1971	
None for the Road	(Young America Films); Harold "Herk" Harvey; writer: Margaret Travis; cast: Keith Painton	bw-15m	1957	video
Norwegian Fisherman-Farmer		c-10m	January 23, 1969	
Numbers 1-10	(Encyclopædia Britannica Films); consultants: Carol Elsholz & Jane Polcyn	c-6m	1988	First Things First: Early Literacy Skills
Nutrition: Some Food for Thought	Ann Schaechtele Ailor	c-11m	1981	
Office Safety: The Thrill Seekers	(Coronet Films); Ralph Mizia; writer: Roger Oliphant	c-10m	1983	
Oil: From Fossil to Flame		c-13m	© April 26, 1976	
On Baking: Math for Bakers		c-20m	1981	Cooking and Baking Skills
One Species Among Many	Charlotte C. & Lee F. Anderson	c-18m	© October 3, 1975	
Operation Grass Killer	(Monsanto Chemical Co.); Harold "Herk" Harvey; writer: Margaret Travis	c-23m	June 3, 1961	
The Other Fellow's Feelings	(Young America Films)	bw-11m	© February 15, 1951	Discussion Problems in Group Living
Other People's Property	(Young America Films)	bw-11m	© September 26, 1951	Discussion Problems in Group Living; video
Our Part in Conservation	(Young America Films & McGraw-Hill)	bw-14m	© April 22, 1959	
The Outsider	(Young America Films)	bw-11m	© November 5, 1951	Discussion Problems in Group Living
Owls	Karl & Peter Maslowski	c-13m	© October 11, 1976	Elementary Natural Science
The Pacific Northwest: Putting Water to Work	(McGraw-Hill)	c-16m	© August 31, 1965	United States Geography
Pakistan: Mound of the Dead	(Chatsworth Film); narrator: Anthony Quayle	c-27m	1973	People & Places of Antiquity
Paper Bandits: Checks, Counterfeit, Credit Cards	(Coronet Films)	c-13m30s	1982	
Paragraphs: Like Scenes in a Film	John W. Clifford	c-15m	1981	video
Paris, the Ageless City	(Young America Films)	bw-12m	© November 1, 1953	
Paris, Un Reve Pour Tous	(McGraw-Hill)	c-16m	© March 17, 1967	Modern Europe Geography
Parts of Our Body	(Encyclopædia Britannica Films); consultants: Carol Elsholz & Jane Polcyn	c-5m	1988	First Things First: Early Literacy Skills
Peanuts and the Peanut Butter Plant		c-10m	© March 13, 1974	
Personal Safety: The Voices of Victims	Lois Wintergreen	c-19m	1979	
Peru	(McGraw-Hill); Harold "Herk" Harvey; writer: Peter Schnitzer; camera: Bob Rose	c-16m	© December 29, 1961	Visitas a La América Del Sur
Peru: People of the Sun	(Chatsworth Film); narrator: Anthony Quayle	c-25m	1973	People & Places of Antiquity
Phillip's Tire	(Phillips); writer: Margaret Travis	c-23m	1966	
Phillips 66, Dealer’s Choice with Ed Ames	(Phillips 66 Petroleum)	c-62m	1966	video
Planning Your Speech	Will A. Linkugel	c-13m	1979	Art of Communication
Playground Safety - As Simple as A, B, C		c-14m	© September 3, 1976	
Poetry for Fun: Dares and Dreams	Nita Wyatt Sundbye	c-13m	© March 17, 1974	
Poetry for Fun: Poetry About Animals	Nita Wyatt Sundbye	c-13m	1972	
Poetry for Fun: Trulier Coolier	Nita Wyatt Sundbye	c-13m	1978	video
Police Officers		c-11m	1980	Community Helpers
The Political Animal	(Gin & Company)	c-15m	© August 1, 1973	
Populations	(Cinema Associate); James L. Koevenig & Sue Hall	c-16m	1972	Basic Biology
Pork: The Meal with a Squeal	(John Deere); Harold "Herk" Harvey; writer: Margaret Travis	c-23m	1963 (revised © June 3, 1977)	
Portrait of a Vandal	Joy Haralick	c-13m	1978	
Postal Workers		c-11m	1980	Community Helpers
Poultry- Laying It on the Line		c-11m	© April 22, 1975	
Pow Wow!	(Haskell Indian Junior College Alumni Association); Archie L. Hawkins & Cheevers Coffey	c-16m	1980	video clip
Power Lawn Mower Safety	(Outdoor Power Equipment Institute)	c-18m	1981	
Preparing a Class Report	(Young America Films & (McGraw-Hill)	c-16m	© June 7, 1960	
Preventing Back Injuries	(Encyclopædia Britannica Films); Robert Kohl (producer); Ralph Mizia; writer: Andrea Warren; consultant: Vernon Speiser	c-13m	1990	Safety in the Work Place (series 2)
Prevention and Intervention	Robert Kohl (producer); David Cook & Ray Tricker	c-15m	1988	Drugs and the College Athlete
Primary School Bus Safety	David H. Soule & Robert A. Larsen	c-15m	© October 6, 1976	
The Procrastinator	(Young America Films)	bw-10m	© December 30, 1952	Discussion Problems in Group Living; video
Protecting Your Head	(Encyclopædia Britannica Films); Robert Kohl (producer); Ralph Mizia; writer: Andrea Warren; consultant: Vernon Speiser	c-12m	1989	Safety in the Work Place (series 1)
Protecting Your Ears	(Encyclopædia Britannica Films); Robert Kohl (producer); Ralph Mizia; writer: Andrea Warren; consultant: Vernon Speiser	c-12m	1989	Safety in the Work Place (series 1)
Protecting Your Feet	(Encyclopædia Britannica Films); Robert Kohl (producer); Ralph Mizia; writer: Andrea Warren; consultant: Vernon Speiser	c-12m	1989	Safety in the Work Place (series 1)
Protecting Your Eyes	(Encyclopædia Britannica Films); Robert Kohl (producer); Ralph Mizia; writer: Andrea Warren; consultant: Vernon Speiser	c-12m	1989	Safety in the Work Place (series 1)
Protecting Your Hands	(Encyclopædia Britannica Films); Robert Kohl (producer); Ralph Mizia; writer: Andrea Warren; consultant: Vernon Speiser	c-12m	1989	Safety in the Work Place (series 1)
Psychological Differences Between the Sexes	(McGraw-Hill); Paul H. Landis	c-19m	© December 31, 1964	Marriage and Family Living Series
Punctuation: Mischievous Marks	Betty Child	c-16m	© 1977	Fearless Punctuation
Putting Commas Between	Betty Child	c-18m	© July 20, 1977	Fearless Punctuation
Raccoon!	Karl & Peter Maslowski	c-11m	1981	Elementary Natural Science
A Rainy Day Story	James Stachowiak	c-13m	1972	
Reaching Your Reader	John W.Clifford	c-17m	© July 30, 1971	Creative Writing
Reaching Your Reader	(Coronet Films); advisor: John R. Searles	c-10m	1983	Effective Writing, 2nd edition of 1971 title
Reading and Critical Thinking	(McGraw-Hill)	c-13m	© November 17, 1967	Effective Reading
Reading Financial Reports: The Income Statement	(Coronet Films)	c-12m	1985	
Reading in the Humanities	(McGraw-Hill)	c-13m	© November 17, 1967	Effective Reading
Reading in the Math and Science Areas	(McGraw-Hill)	c-13m	© November 17, 1967	Effective Reading
Reading Rainbow			1983	
Rebound	Harold "Herk" Harvey	c-21m	1958	video
Recourse for the Consumer		c-18m	1981	Personal Finances and Effective Consumership
Recreational Drugs	Robert Kohl (producer); David Cook & Ray Tricker	c-15m	1988	Drugs and the College Athlete
Reducing Office Injury	(Encyclopædia Britannica Films); Robert Kohl (producer); Ralph Mizia; writer: Andrea Warren; consultant: Vernon Speiser	c-13m	1990	Safety in the Work Place (series 2)
Reporting and Explaining (Reporting and Briefing)	E. Christian Buehler & Will A. Linkugel	c-14m	© May 1, 1970	Art of Communication; video
The Reproductive System	(Seabourne Enterprises); Donald Walton	c-7m	1972	Basic Anatomy and Physiology of the Mammal
The Respiratory System	(Seabourne Enterprises); Donald Walton	c-7m	1972	Basic Anatomy and Physiology of the Mammal
Response for the Consumer		c-18m	1981	Personal Finances and Effective Consumership
Responsibility	(Young America Films)	bw-10m	© March 12, 1953	Discussion Problems in Group Living; video
Retirement Planning: Thinking Ahead	(Coronet Films)	c-13m	1985	
Rice: Biggest Small Grain in the World		c-12m	1980	
The Road From Mandalay: Rudyard Kipling	(Chatsworth Film); Robert Fuest	c-30m	1977	
The Rocky Mountain Area: Backbone of the Nation	(McGraw-Hill); Clyde F. Kohn	c-16m	© May 21, 1963	United States Geography
The Role of the Congressman	Howard D. Mehlinger & John J. Patrick	c-23m	© August 15, 1971	
Role of the Interest Group Leader	Gin & Company	c-16m	© April 14, 1973	
Roosevelt and U.S. History: 1882-1929		bw-28m	1974	video clip
Roosevelt and U.S. History: 1930-1945		bw-28m	1974	video clip
Rough Diamond: Ernest Hemingway	Richard Marquand & Jesse Lasky Jr.; cast: Larry Hoodekoff	part c-30m	1978	
Rowan and Martin on the Driveway One Fine Day	(Phillips 66 Petroleum); Harold "Herk" Harvey; writer: Margaret Travis	c-23m	1960	
Safety on Street and Sidewalk	David H. Soule	c-11m	© May 25, 1976	
Safety on the School Bus	(Young America Films)	bw-10m	© August 15, 1950	
Scandinavia: The Rewards of Excellence	(McGraw-Hill)	c-18m	© November 7, 1966	Modern Europe Geography
School Bus Safety and Courtesy		c-15m	© October 17, 1974, revised 1983	Video
School Lunchroom Manners	Martha & Paul Buchanan, J. S. Pruett	c-10m	1979	
School Workers		c-11m	1980	Community Helpers
Seasonal Changes in Plants	(McGraw-Hill)	c-11m	© December 27, 1957	
Seasons: Autumn		c-11m	1980	video
Seasons: Spring		c-11m	1980	
Seasons: Summer		c-11m	1980	
Seasons: Winter		c-11m	1980	video
The Secret to the Sixties	(Phillips); writer: Margaret Travis; cast: Eddie Albert & Anita Bryant	c-23m	1965	video
Sentences: Many Ways to Begin	John W. Clifford	c-15m	1981	
Sewing Advanced Seams	(Young America Films); Arthur H. Wolf	bw-11m	© October 27, 1947	
Sewing Fundamentals	(Young America Films); Helen Lohr & Arthur H. Wolf	bw-10m	© December 15, 1947	
Sewing Pattern Interpretation	(Young America Films); Helen Lohr & Arthur H. Wolf	bw-11m	© December 30, 1947	
Sewing Simple Seams	(Young America Films); Arthur H. Wolf	bw-11m	© October 10, 1947	video
Sewing Slide Fasteners	(Young America Films); Helen Lohr & Arthur H. Wolf	bw-11m	© December 29, 1947	
Sewing: Characteristics and Handling of Materials	(Young America Films); Helen Lohr & Arthur H. Wolf	bw-11m	© April 9, 1948	
Sewing: Fitting a Pattern	(Young America Films)	bw-11m	© May 24, 1951	
Shake Hands with Danger	(Caterpillar Inc. & National Safety Council); Harold "Herk" Harvey; script: John Clifford; original music: Jim Stringer	c-23m	September 1979	video
Shoplifters: The Criminal Hordes		c-15m	1983	
Show-Off	(Young America Films) Harold Harvey	bw-12m	© February 1, 1954	Discussion Problems in Group Living; video
Signals: Read 'Em Or Weep	(Caterpillar Inc.) Harold "Herk" Harvey; writer: John Clifford	c-6m	1981	
Simple Plumbing Repairs	Harley P. Gover	c-21m	1981	Home Repairs
Simple Techniques in Shaping Glass	writer: John Clifford	c-23m	© May 1, 1970	
Sir John on the Spot		c-12m	© April 19, 1974	
Skin: Your Amazing Birthday Suit	Ann Schaechtele Ailor	c-11m	1981	
Small Predatory Mammals	Karl & Peter Maslowski	c-13m	© February 2, 1973	Elementary Natural Science
Snakes Can Be Interesting	(Young America Films) Margaret Carlile Travis	bw-12m	© December 4, 1952	
The Snob	(Young America Films & McGraw-Hill)	c-15m	© September 8, 1958	Discussion Problems in Group Living; (color print) video
Solid Gold Customer	(Conoco); writer: Margaret Travis	c-23m	1966	
Songbirds	Karl & Peter Maslowski	c-13m	© March 15, 1974	Elementary Natural Science
Sound of a Stone	(Board of Economic Relations of the Methodist Church)	bw-27m	© February 22, 1955	
Sound, Acoustics and Recording	(Coronet Films); Mel Waskin	c-14m	1986	The Physical Sciences; video clip
Sound, Energy and Wave Motion	(Coronet Films)	c-14m	1986	The Physical Sciences; video clip
The Southern New England Region: New Industries	(McGraw-Hill); Clyde F. Kohn	c-13m	© May 21, 1963	United States Geography
The Southwest: Land of Promise	(McGraw-Hill); Clyde F. Kohn	c-13m	© May 21, 1963	United States Geography
Soybeans: The Magic Beanstalk	E. L. Mader	c-18m	© October 3, 1975	
Spain and Portugal: on the Threshold of Success	(McGraw-Hill)	c-19m	© November 7, 1966	Modern Europe Geography
The Specific Is Terrific	John W. Clifford	c-12m	© October 1, 1971	Creative Writing
The Specific Is Terrific	(Coronet Films); advisor: John R. Searles	c-9m	1983	Effective Writing; 2nd edition of a 1971 title
Speech: Conducting a Meeting	(Young America Films)	bw-11m	© April 16, 1952	
Speech: Conversation	(Young America Films); Harold Harvey	bw-12m	© May 1, 1953	
Speech: Effective Listening	(McGraw-Hill)	bw-15m	1959	
Speech: Function of Gestures	(Young America Films)	bw-11m	December 1949	video
Speech: Group Discussion	(Young America Films) Harold Harvey	bw-12m	© April 1, 1954	
Speech: Planning Your Talk	(Young America Films)	bw-13m	© August 31, 1951	
Speech: Platform Posture and Appearance	(Young America Films)	bw-11m	© November 11, 1949	video
Speech: Stage Fright and What to Do About It	Arthur H. Wolf	bw-11m	© October 28, 1949	video
Speech: Using Your Voice	(Young America Films)	bw-11m	© August 31, 1950	
Speech: Using Visuals In Your Speech	(McGraw-Hill)	bw-15m	© March 15, 1960	
The Speed Klect Collator	writer: John Clifford	c-23m	1974	
Splash! Science and Swimming	Robert D. Townsend	c-16m	© February 13, 1976	
The Springfield Gun	(National Right to Work Committee)	c-26m	© May 1, 1971	Creative Writing
Stage Fright: What You Can Do About It	E. Christian Buehler & Will A. Linkugel	c-11m	© November 21, 1969	Art of Communication
Stalin and Russian History		part c-30m	1974	
Static and Current Electricity	(Coronet Films)	c-16m	1985	The Physical Sciences
Steel, the Metal Giant		c-12m	1981	Video
Stop That Period! Period That Stop!	Betty Child	c-18m	© September 14, 1977	Fearless Punctuation
Street and Sanitation Department Workers		c-11m	1980	Community Helpers
Street Safety Is Your Problem	(Young America Films) Charles Evans Lacey	bw-10m	© September 15, 1952	
The Struggle for Vicksburg		c-19m	© July 12, 1974	
Sugar and the Cane		c-9m	© November 11, 1969	
Suicide: The Warning Signs	(Coronet Films & American Association of University Women, Kansas City)	c (video)-24m	1982	
Survival After High School		c-18m	1981	Personal Finances and Effective Consumership
Swish! Science and Curveballs	Robert D. Townsend	c-10m	© December 8, 1976	
Switzerland and Austria: The Mountain Countries	(McGraw-Hill)	c-20m	© November 7, 1966	Modern Europe Geography
Take a Letter... From A to Z	Harold "Herk" Harvey; writer: Margaret Travis	c-15m	1967	
Taking Care of Your School Building	Martha & Paul Buchanan, J. S. Pruett	c-10m	1979	
Taking Commas Aside	Betty Child	c-18m	© July 20, 1977	Fearless Punctuation
The Team of Your Life	(Caterpillar Inc.); Maurice Prather; writer: Margaret Travis	bw-21m	1958	
The Team of Your Life (updated)	(Caterpillar Inc.); Donald Peterson & Gene Carr (producers); Harold "Herk" Harvey; writer: John Clifford	c-19m	1982	
Technique of Polycentric-Type Knee Arthroplasty	(Zimmer USA)	c-32m	© December 18, 1972	
Techniques for the Phone Sales	(Coronet Films)	c-12m	1982	Telemarketing
Techniques in Hanging Wallpaper	Tim Notah	c-21m	1981	Home Repairs
Techniques of Organic Chemistry	(Young America Films); Louis F. Fieser	c-4 shorts (10m each)	© December 10, 1956	
Techniques: Tritration of an Acid with a Base	Clark E. Bricker	c-8m	© April 1, 1970	Fundamentals of Chemistry
Techniques: Use of Volumetric Glassware	Clark E. Bricker	c-8m	© April 1, 1970	Fundamentals of Chemistry
Technology of Trash	(Caterpillar Inc.)	c-10m	1984	
Teenagers Create an Animated Film		c-10m	© February 1, 1971	
Teeth: Some Facts to Chew On	Ann Schaechtele Ailor	c-11m	1981	video clip
Tell It Like It Is	(American Vocational Association); Harold "Herk" Harvey; writer: Margaret Travis: original music: The Upside Dawne	c-27m	1968	
Thailand: Land of Smiles		c-27m	1977	
Themes: The Day When Nothing Made Sense	John W. Clifford	c-15m	1981	
They	Len Schneider	c-16m	1972	video
Things Dissolve		bw-10m	© August 27, 1957	
Things Expand When Heated	(Young America Films); Arthur H, Wolff & Gerald S. Craig	bw-11m	© June 24, 1949	
This Is KS	(Travel Industry Association of Kansas); Ralph Mizia; writer: Trudy Davis	c-16m	1983	
Thonk! Science and Hitting a Ball	Robert D. Townsend	c-20m	© September 30, 1976	
The Time Bomb Within	(Coronet Films); advisor: Howard Baumgartel	c-14m	1984	Managing Stress
To Save a Life: Choking	(Encyclopædia Britannica Films); Thomas G. Smith (producer)	c-11m	© May 27, 1977	
To Save a Life: CPR	(Encyclopædia Britannica Films); Thomas G. Smith (producer)	c-11m	© August 4, 1977	
To Save a Life: Survival Swimming	(Encyclopædia Britannica Films); Thomas G. Smith (producer)	c-15m	© July 27, 1977	
Tommy the Lion	(Young America Films)	bw-10m	© March 30, 1952	
Tomorrow Mind	(General Motors)	c-22m	1980	
Tomorrow's Spark Plug Day	(AC Delco Co.); writer: Margaret Travis	c-23m	1964	
Topeka is a People Place	Centron	c-22m	1970	Topeka Chamber of Commerce and Southwestern Bell promotional film
Transportation By Air	(Young America Films & McGraw-Hill)	bw-10m	© December 30, 1957	
Transportation By Land	(Young America Films)	bw-10m	© May 10, 1957	
Transportation By Water	(Young America Films)	bw-10m	© December 3, 1957	
The Troublemaker	(Young America Films & McGraw-Hill)	c-12m	© March 30, 1959	Discussion Problems in Group Living; (BW version) video
Turkey: Crossroads of the Ancient World	(Chatsworth Film); narrator: Anthony Quayle	c-27m	1973	People & Places of Antiquity
Twelve Month Summer	(American Dehydrators Association)	c-18m	1960	
Two Indians: Red Reflections of Life		c-26m	1972	Native American Indians Today
U.S. Trade and Farm Products		c-12m	© November 20, 1975	
Uhh! Whoosh! and Thud! Science in Throwing and Catching	Robert D. Townsend	c-14m	© September 17, 1976	
Understanding Others	(Young America Films & McGraw-Hill)	bw-11m	© January 7, 1959	video
Unfriendly Fauna and Flora	Karl & Peter Maslowski	c-15m	1980	Elementary Natural Science
The United Kingdom: Crowded Islands	(McGraw-Hill)	c-19m	© November 7, 1966	Modern Europe Geography
Use and Care of Books	Martha & Paul Buchanan, J. S. Pruett	c-10m	1979	video
Using a Pocket Calculator	Thomas H. Metos & Gary G. Bitter	c-17m	1978	
Using and Caring for Art Materials		c-11m	© April 26, 1973	
Using Ladders	(Encyclopædia Britannica Films); Robert Kohl (producer); Ralph Mizia; writer: Andrea Warren; consultant: Vernon Speiser	c-13m	1990	Safety in the Work Place (series 2)
Using the Pocket Calculator		c-16m	© September 14, 1978	
Utility Workers		c-11m	1980	Community Helpers
Vegetables - From Garden to Table		c-20m	1981	Cooking and Baking Skills; video
Venezuela	(McGraw-Hill); Harold "Herk" Harvey; writer: Peter Schnitzer; camera: Bob Rose	c-16m	© December 29, 1961	Visitas a La América Del Sur
Venice	(Young America Films)	bw-12m	© November 1, 1953	
A Voter Decides	(Gin & Company)	c-16m	© April 4, 1973	
Water Mills: Monuments to the Past	(John Deere); Ken Boltz; writer: Trudy Travis	c-7m	1984	
Water Safety	(Young America Films) Harold Harvey	bw-10m	© November 1, 1953	
Water Safety: The Basics	Robert L. Baldwin & Tom Hairabedian	c-17m	1979	
The Weather Station	(Young America Films)	bw-10m	© March 15, 1957	
Weaving: Frame Looms	(Spinners Guild of Australia); Erika Semler	c-11m	1977	
Weaving: Inkle Looms	(Spinners Guild of Australia); Erika Semler	c-11m	1977	
Weaving: Simple Looms	(Spinners Guild of Australia); Erika Semler	c-11m	1977	
Weaving: Table Looms	(Spinners Guild of Australia); Erika Semler	c-11m	1977	
Weaving: The Rigid Heddle Frame	(Spinners Guild of Australia); Erika Semler	c-11m	1977	
West Germany: Industrial Giant	(McGraw-Hill)	c-19m	© November 7, 1966	Modern Europe Geography
What About Drinking? (What About Alcoholism?)	(Young America Films)	bw-10m	© November 10, 1954	Discussion Problems in Group Living
What About Juvenile Delinquency?	(Young America Films) Gene Courtney	bw-12m	© April 8, 1955	Discussion Problems in Group Living; featured on an episode of Mystery Science Theater 3000
What About Prejudice?	(Young America Films & McGraw-Hill)	c-12m	© April 9, 1959	Discussion Problems in Group Living; (BW version) video
What About School Spirit?	(Young America Films & McGraw-Hill)	bw-12m	© March 20, 1959	Discussion Problems in Group Living; video
What Ecologists Do	(Cinema Associate); James L. Koevenig & Sue Hall	c-16m	© February 1, 1971	Basic Biology
What Is Active and Creative Reading?	(McGraw-Hill); writer: Margaret Travis	bw-10m	1958	
What Is Active and Creative Reading? (updated)	(McGraw-Hill)	c-13m	© November 17, 1967	Effective Reading
What Is Effective Reading?	(McGraw-Hill)	c-13m	© November 17, 1967	Effective Reading
What the World Dishes Out	(Coronet Films); advisor: Howard Baumgartel	c-14m	1985	Managing Stress
What They Have: The Balance Sheet	(Coronet Films)	c-15m	1985	
What They've Been Doing: The Income Statement	(Coronet Films)	c-12m	1985	
What You Bring to Yourself	(Coronet Films); advisor: Howard Baumgartel	c-14m	1985	Managing Stress
Wheat - From Field to Flour	E. L. Mader	c-11m	© October 12, 1973	video
Where Has the Warrior Gone?	(Coleman Film Enterprises); J. Donald McIntyre	c-13m	© April 1, 1971	Native American Indians Today
Who Pays the Fiddler?		c-7m	© April 1, 1971	
The Who and Why of Reading	(McGraw-Hill)	c-13m	© November 17, 1967	Effective Reading
Who's Who in the Zoo	(Beacon Films); Gary Clarke	c-12m	© October 2, 1974	
Why Handle It Twice?	(Caterpillar Inc.)	c-10m	1979	
Why Punctuate?	(Young America Films); Hardy R. Finch	bw-11m	© November 20, 1948	
Why Study Home Economics?	(Young America Films)	bw-9m	© November 15, 1955	video
Why Study Industrial Arts?	(Young America Films)	bw-9m	© April 26, 1956	Featured on an episode of Mystery Science Theater 3000; video
Why Study Science?	(Young America Films); Margaret C. Travis	bw-12m	© January 31, 1955	
Why Study Speech?	(Young America Films); Harold Harvey	bw-10m	© November 15, 1954	
Winning Moves in Maintenance	(Caterpillar Inc.); Maurice Prather; writer: Margaret Travis	bw-22m	1956	
Wise and Responsible Consumership	Nancy L. Garland	c-14m	© October 12, 1973	
Words of Courtesy	(Young America Films) Margaret C. Travis	bw-12m	© May 24, 1954	
Work Is Child's Play	(Texas Education Agency)	c-27m	1973	
You	James Stachowiak	c-16m	1973	
You Asked About Topeka	Centron	c-20m	1960	Topeka Chamber of Commerce and Southwestern Bell promotional video
You and KU	(Kansas University)	c-10m	1983	
Your Cleanliness	(Young America Films)	bw-10m	© June 15, 1953	
Your Heritage in Old Miss	(University of Mississippi)	bw-10m	1948	
Your Junior High Days	(McGraw-Hill); Harold "Herk" Harvey; writer: Margaret Travis	bw-11m	1961	
Your Table Manners	(Young America Films)	bw-10m	© November 15, 1955	
Your University	(University of Kansas)	bw-10m	1948	

== See also ==
- Educational film
- Social guidance film
- Travel documentary
