= Larkin Smith (Virginia politician) =

American politician

10th Speaker of the Virginia House of Delegates
- In office 1799–1802 Serving with Edmund Byne
- Preceded by: John Wise
- Succeeded by: Edmund Harrison

Member of the Virginia House of Delegates from King and Queen County
- In office December 2, 1799-December 4, 1803 Serving with Richard Corbin, Benjamin Dabney
- Preceded by: Henry Young
- Succeeded by: Thomas G. Smith
- In office December 1, 1797-December 22, 1798 Serving with Richard Brooke
- Preceded by: Henry Young
- Succeeded by: Henry Young
- In office October 1, 1792-November 11, 1794 Serving with John Walker Semple
- Preceded by: Benjamin Dabney
- Succeeded by: Benjamin Dabney
- In office June 23, 1788-October 17, 1790 Serving with Anderson Scott, William Roane
- Preceded by: William Dudley
- Succeeded by: Benjamin Dabney
- In office May 3, 1784-October 16, 1785
- Preceded by: Henry Todd
- Succeeded by: William Dudley

Personal details
- Born: 10 July 1745 Rickahock, Virginia
- Died: 28 September 1813 (aged 68) Fredericksburg, Virginia
- Spouse(s): Mary Eleanor Hill (m. 1781; died 1797) Sophia Ann Tazewell Taliaferro
- Children: 1

Military service
- Allegiance: United States
- Branch/service: Virginia Militia; Continental Army
- Years of service: 1777–1783 (Continental Army; 1775-1807 (Virginia militia)
- Rank: Colonel(Virginia militia); Captainl(Continental Army)
- Battles/wars: American Revolutionary War

Larkin Smith (10 Jul 1745 — 28 Sep 1813) was a Virginia officer, planter and politician who represented King and Queen County in the Virginia House of Delegates, and served as that body's Speaker from 1799 until 1802.

== Early and family life ==
Born at Richahock (or Rick-a-hoc) plantation in King and Queen County to Mary Chew and her planter husband, John Smith. A member of the First Families of Virginia, he could trace his ancestors in the colony several generations back to immigrants from England.

== Military service ==
Smith enlisted in November 1775 as a private in a company of minutemen. He was promoted to cadet in the 6th Virginia Regiment on February 10, 1776, then cornet of the 4th Regiment Continental Light Dragoons on August 1, 1777. His first officer's commission was issued on September 4, 1778, when he became a lieutenant. He was promoted to captain on April 1, 1780, and received land in southern Virginia as partial compensation for his patriotic service. Following the conflict, Smith became a member of the Society of the Cincinnati and continued in the Virginia militia, retiring as Colonel of the Regiment of Dragoons in 1807.

== Career ==
Following the war, on September 30, 1784, Smith became one of the Justices of the Peace which collectively ruled his native King and Queen County.

King and Queen County voters elected Smith as their (part-time) representative in the Virginia House of Delegates in 1784-1785 and both re-elected him and failed to re-elect him many times. In the period June 7, 1794 until 1797 he was ineligible for legislative service because fellow legislators elected him as a member of the Governor's Privy Council which governed the Commonwealth's small executive branch. During their joint Privy Council service, he and Edmund Harrison (who would succeed him as speaker) on October 7, 1794, issued a report to the Governor on the condition of the State Treasury. Smith again won election to the Virginia House of Delegates in 1797, and was re-elected several times. Fellow delegates elected and re-elected him as their Speaker beginning in 1799, and he served until 1802.

Smith moved to Norfolk, Virginia after President Jefferson appointed him tax Collector for the Port of Norfolk, serving from October 12, 1807, until his death on September 28, 1813. During the War of 1812, despite his age and retirement from the militia in 1807, Smith commanded troops at Norfolk.

Larkin Smith was taxed on 19 enslaved adults and 20 children in King and Queen County in 1787, as well as 11 horses, 34 cattle and a four-wheeled chariot. Probably the grant based on his military service was in Cumberland County whose tax rolls in 1787 showed him as nonresident but owning three slaves, four horses and seven cattle.

== Personal life ==
Smith married twice. On April 21, 1781, he married Mary Eleanor Hill, who bore a son, John Hill Smith (1783-1843), who would continue his father's political and legal careers in Lynchburg and Richmond. Following her death, on May 25, 1804, Smith married Sophia Ann Tazewell Taliaferro (widow of Benjamin Taliaferro) at the home of her brother, Littleton Waller Tazewell, who would become Governor of Virginia in 1834–36. Her father was U.S. Senator Henry Tazewell of Williamsburg, who had died in 1799. A family member in South Carolina may have honored Larkin Smith by naming a son in his honor, who gave birth to a daughter, Nancy Smith Cantrell (1808-1881) five years before his death but decades after his first wife's death, who eventually married in Tennessee and then moved to Missouri.

== Death and legacy ==
Smith died in Fredericksburg, the nearest city north of King and Queen County, in 1813. He is buried considerably south, in Dinwiddie County, as is his son, both in a rock wall cemetery with various names (including Village View, Diamon Springs or Smith Farm). His former home, Rickahoc, burned late in the century, long after the remaining Smiths left the county. Further complicating matters, King and Queen County records were burned in the fire during the Confederate evacuation of Richmond in April 1865; one of the few records mentioning this man lists him as an executor of the estate of Henry Gaines.
