= Trichalophus simplex =

Scientific classification
- Kingdom: Animalia
- Phylum: Arthropoda
- Class: Insecta
- Order: Coleoptera
- Suborder: Polyphaga
- Infraorder: Cucujiformia
- Family: Curculionidae
- Genus: Trichalophus
- Species: T. simplex

Binomial name
- Trichalophus simplex LeConte, 1876

Species of beetle

Trichalophus simplex is a species of broad-nosed weevil in the beetle family Curculionidae. It is found in North America.
