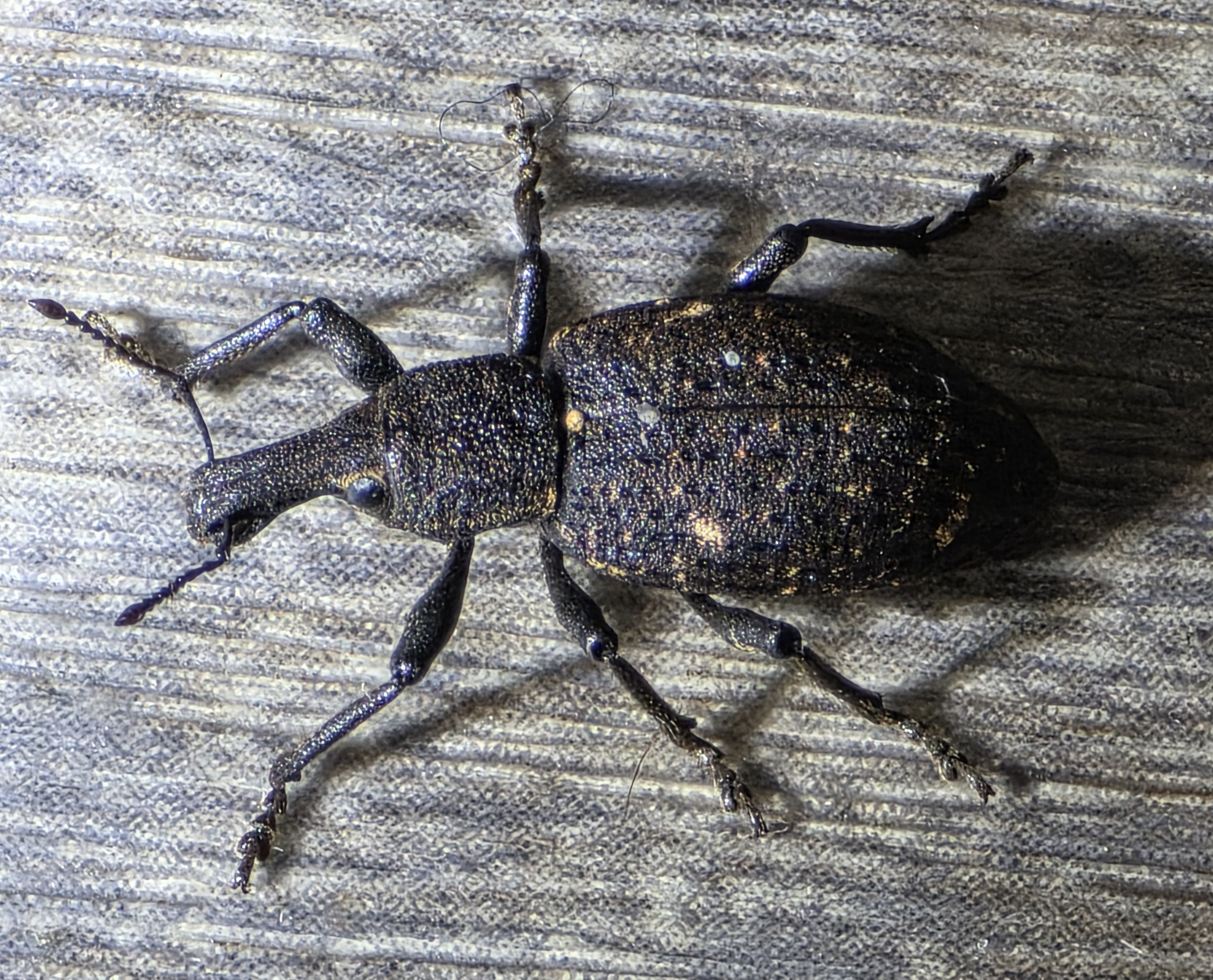

Scientific classification
- Kingdom: Animalia
- Phylum: Arthropoda
- Class: Insecta
- Order: Coleoptera
- Suborder: Polyphaga
- Infraorder: Cucujiformia
- Family: Curculionidae
- Genus: Plinthodes
- Species: P. taeniatus

Binomial name
- Plinthodes taeniatus (LeConte, 1857)

= Plinthodes taeniatus =

Species of beetle

Plinthodes taeniatus is a species of broad-nosed weevil in the beetle family Curculionidae. It is found in North America.
