= John Barnes (film producer) =

American film director and producer (1920–2000)

John Wadsworth Barnes (March 25, 1920 – June 27, 2000) was an American film director and producer. He was most active in the educational film industry, producing, directing and writing for Encyclopædia Britannica Films. In his career he worked on and helped create over 100 film projects. He produced the Academy Award nominated documentary The Living City. He wrote for a radio drama series, made experimental Bolex films, and produced the film To Live Together.

== Biography ==
John Barnes was born on March 25, 1920, in Belford, New Jersey. He came from a blue-collar, East Coast background of craftsmen. In elementary school Barnes had rheumatic fever that sparked a love for books and learning which was very influential on him. Another early influence was his teenage rebellion against his mother that influenced his attitude towards people he thought of as inferior intellectually and those who caused inconvenience or challenged his choices artistically and professionally.

In 1939 Barnes graduated from Monmouth Junior College in Long Branch New Jersey. He later went on to attend the University of Chicago. John Barnes worked as an editor for the literary magazine of the university. He did not end up graduating.

John Barnes died in the New York University Medical Center on June 27, 2000. He was 80 years old at the time of his death.

== Career ==
Following his time at the University of Chicago, Barnes went on to pursue writing for CBS, the local radio station. One of the main projects he worked on with CBS was a short radio-drama series, featuring Ken Nordine as the host. He was fiercely protective of this films and would demand those who asked for changes to his scripts and films to defend their request before considering it.

Barnes' works frequently starred notable actors such as Judi Dench, Douglass Campbell, Richard Kiley, as well as Frances Sternhagen. Barnes wrote and directed a series titled Shaw v. Shakespeare that featured George Bernard Shaw as played by actor Donald Moffat. The three part series has been accepted by many as Barnes's magnum opus. Barnes put much weight on casting actors who were excellent at their craft and even with budget constraints he avoided casting lesser actors.

Barnes worked with Encyclopædia Britannica for over 20 years. His immense amount of educational films remain screened, circulated, and present today. After going from making documentary film to academic, he stayed in educational film from the early 1950s and persevered into the late 1970s when educational film experienced a golden era. Educational films were typically used to ignite classroom discussions after the screening, that meant that the context, history, and complete story had to be told in a short period of time. These discussion periods, according to educational theorists, engage with students better than lectures and reading by allowing students to express their opinions and learn from speaking to each other. Later, Barnes moved away from film making and wrote plays, some were produced in the U.S. and Canada.

=== Encyclopaedia Britannica ===
In 1952 he embarked on his first project with EB Films, with Gordon Weisenborn as director and Barnes as writer and producer. People Along the Mississippi is said to be one of the first portrayals of the interaction between black and white children on film. Barnes fought against institutional censorship in southern schools which helped expand production and distribution of integrated educational films.

His Oscar nominated documentary The Living City, about urban issues mainly in Chicago. Despite what Oscar nominations may allude to, those filmmakers who produced educational films made very little and relied on others to finance them so that they could continue with this career. He is known for the abundance of social themes in his films, like in the films he made for Encyclopædia Britannica's 'Bill of Rights' series.

Barnes continued to produce and direct iconic literary adaptations like Macbeth: The Politics of Power (1964) as well as more politically oriented works such as Equality under the Law: The Lost Generation of Prince Edward County (1966) and People along the Mississippi (1951) that have interracial themes, which was influenced by his mother's racist actions towards a teenage friend of Barnes.

== Awards ==
- The Living City (1953) was nominated for an Academy Award for Best Documentary Short Film
- NET Festival (1966) won a primetime Emmy in 1970 for the episode "Cinderella: National Ballet of Canada" for Outstanding Variety or Musical Program - Classical Music
