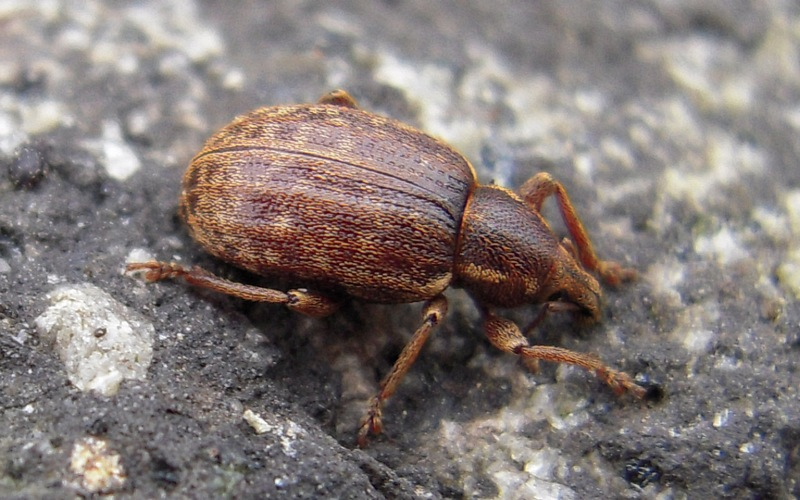

Scientific classification
- Domain: Eukaryota
- Kingdom: Animalia
- Phylum: Arthropoda
- Class: Insecta
- Order: Coleoptera
- Suborder: Polyphaga
- Infraorder: Cucujiformia
- Family: Curculionidae
- Genus: Lepidophorus
- Species: L. inquinatus

Binomial name
- Lepidophorus inquinatus (Mannerheim, 1852)

= Lepidophorus inquinatus =

Species of beetle

Lepidophorus inquinatus is a species of broad-nosed weevil in the family Curculionidae. It is found in North America.
