= Plinthodes =

Scientific classification
- Kingdom: Animalia
- Phylum: Arthropoda
- Class: Insecta
- Order: Coleoptera
- Suborder: Polyphaga
- Infraorder: Cucujiformia
- Family: Curculionidae
- Tribe: Alophini
- Genus: Plinthodes; LeConte, 1876

Genus of beetles

Plinthodes is a genus of broad-nosed weevils in the beetle family Curculionidae. There are at least two described species in Plinthodes.

== Species ==
These two species belong to the genus Plinthodes:

- Plinthodes foveirostris (Chittenden, 1925)^{i c}
- Plinthodes taeniatus (LeConte, 1857)^{i c g b}

Data sources: i = ITIS, c = Catalogue of Life, g = GBIF, b = Bugguide.net
