= Gordon Weisenborn =

American film director

Gordon Weisenborn (March 20, 1923 – October 4, 1987) was an American director, producer, writer, and cinematographer specializing in sponsored and educational films. His works express a style that blends naturalism and lyricism with modernist abstraction. Many of Weisenborn's films address race and issues of diversity, and his film People Along the Mississippi (1952), produced with John Barnes, is credited as being the first classroom film to depict interracial friendship. He worked with John Barnes on the Academy Award-nominated film The Living City (1953), and won over 70 national and international awards for films and productions. He was listed as one of the top 20 makers of specialized film by the Directors Guild.

== Personal life ==
Weisenborn was born in Chicago to Rudolph and Fritzie Weisenborn, who were both figures in the arts communities. Weisenborn's father was an internationally recognized Chicago Modernist painter and art instructor who is credited with creating the first abstract painting to be exhibited at the Art Institute of Chicago. His mother, Fritizie, was an art critic for Chicago Sunday Times. Weisenborn attended the University of Chicago, where he majored in theatre. The Weisenborns befriended John Grierson who was known as the father of the documentary film. Weisenborn married Selma Revsin, with whom he partnered on a number of films until her death in 1980. Weisenborn died at Michael Reese Hospital and Medical Center, at 64 years of age. Before his death, Weisenborn gave the rights to his films to Jack Behrend, an industrial filmmaker who he was good friends with. The rights to both Weisenborn's films and Behrend's films are currently held by the Chicago Film Archives.

== Career ==
Weisenborn began his filmmaking career at the age of 19 as an assistant to pioneering documentary filmmaker John Grierson. Under Grierson's wing, Weisenborn began making films for the National Film Board of Canada, and built important relationships with other documentary filmmakers, including George Stoney. Over the course of his career, Gordon Weisenborn tried his hand as director, cinematographer, editor, writer, and producer, specializing in educational and sponsored films. He worked closely with his wife, Selma Revsin, on numerous films, including Mural Midwest Metropolis (1960), Girls Are Better Than Ever (1967), and Facing Up To Vandalism (1973), and with John Barnes, with whom he made numerous films, including People Along the Mississippi (1952), The Living City (1953), and various films to accompany "Dick and Jane" stories in the early 1950s. Weisenborn's career was highly influenced through his friendship with John Barnes and his wife Selma Revsin, and with them he created several films. Weisenborn and Barnes ended up splitting ways after a while of working together. The split geared Weisenborn towards sponsored films as well as industrial ones. Weisenborn began teaching at Columbia College Chicago in the 1960s. In 1970, Weisenborn started his own production company, Gordon Weisenborn Productions, Inc. Under his company, Weisenborn continued to produce sponsored and educational films.

=== Important films ===
Weisenborn directed When Asia Speaks (1944) with producer Stuart Legg throughout his early career while he worked at the National Film Board of Canada. It was produced towards the end of WWII, and presents a Western perspective on Asian nationalism. The film also discusses ending colonialism.

Another important work Gordon Weisenborn filmed was Feeling All Right (1948), which was sponsored by the Mississippi Board of Health and the United States Public Health Service as part of a multimedia campaign. Weisenborn was cinematographer for the work, and he worked alongside Fred Lasse and George Stoney in the creation of this piece. The award-winning film was considered semidocumentary narrative in form and intended to promote public health within the African American community and, more specifically, educated the community about syphilis and its prevention. It was seen by as many an estimated one million viewers and incorporated into mobile testing units to drive testing for and treatment of the condition. Film director Raymond Spottiswoode praised the work for treating the usually overdramatized subject through a simple and frank approach, but the NAACP opposed the distribution of the film for fear it would worsen stigmatization, segregation, and inequality.

Weisenborn worked alongside John Barnes in the creation of several films. One of these films is People Along the Mississippi (1952), a film Weisenborn shot and directed which is notable for its focus on social and ethnic diversity in the United States and is credited as being the first educational film to present children of diverse races interacting with each other. Although the film makes use of stylistic techniques typical of a documentary, it incorporates a somewhat mythic storyline as it traces ethnicities down the Mississippi River.

Another film Weisenborn worked on with John Barnes was the Academy Award nominated film The Living City (1953). The film was produced for Encyclopædia Britannica Films and explored the solutions to city planning issues and other urban problems in American cities.

Weisenborn worked as associate producer for another Academy Award nominee, The Naked Eye (1956), alongside director Louis Clyde Stoumen. The film was nominated for "Best Documentary Feature" at the 29th Academy Awards in 1957, and won the Robery J. Flaherty Award at the Edinburgh Film Festival and a Special Award at the Venice Film Festival. The film discusses the history of the camera and photography from invention through development. In 1956, he wrote and directed A Changing Liberia, a promotional film for Firestone Rubber Plantations.

Mural Midwest Metropolis (1960) is considered one of Weisenborn's better known films. Weisenborn directed the film, and cowrote it with his wife, Selma Revsin. The award-winning film, which was shot in and around Chicago, was produced by the Fred A. Niles Communications Center and sponsored by S&H Green Stamps for the purpose of promoting the city of Chicago as a major tourist destination.

Weisenborn also directed the feature-length horror exploitation film Prime Time (1960) alongside producer Herschell Gordon Lewis. The film placed an emphasis on plot and character, and is credited as being the first feature film to be shot and produced entirely out of Chicago after the closing of Essanay studios.

Weisenborn shot and directed Water is Wet (1969) for the television program The Metooshow, which aired on Chicago Public TV. The film is one of four short educational films that were produced by the Erikson Institute for Early Childhood Learning. The optimistic film is shot around Chicago and uses experimental methods and media. Using water as a motif, the film was intended to inspire children to learn through experience and connect them with their feelings.

A full filmography can be found on the Academic Film Archive of North America.
