= Lepidophorus lineaticollis =

Scientific classification
- Domain: Eukaryota
- Kingdom: Animalia
- Phylum: Arthropoda
- Class: Insecta
- Order: Coleoptera
- Suborder: Polyphaga
- Infraorder: Cucujiformia
- Family: Curculionidae
- Genus: Lepidophorus
- Species: L. lineaticollis

Binomial name
- Lepidophorus lineaticollis Kirby, 1837

Species of beetle

Lepidophorus lineaticollis is a species of broad-nosed weevil in the beetle family Curculionidae. It is found in North America.
