= Encyclopædia Britannica Films =

Producer and distributor of educational films

Encyclopaedia Britannica Educational Corporation (EBEC)
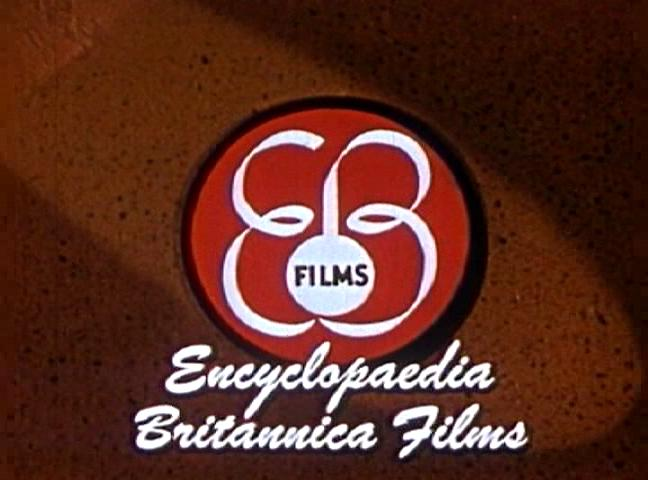
- Encyclopædia Britannica logo, 1952
- Type: Private
- Industry: 16mm educational films
- Founded: 1943; 83 years ago
- Founder: John E. Otterson
- Defunct: 1995; 31 years ago
- Fate: Production Halted; Select Assets were integrated to other companies
- Headquarters: Wilmette, United States

Encyclopædia Britannica Films (also named EB Films for short) was an American Film distributor of educational 16 mm films and later VHS videocassettes for schools and libraries from 1943 until 1995. Prior to 1943, the company operated under the name of Electrical Research Products Inc. (ERPI) Classroom Films.

== History ==
=== Early years as ERPI Classroom Films ===
In November 1928, John Otterson of Electrical Research Products Inc. decided to make use of the latest sound technology in 35mm motion pictures and apply it to the 16mm format that was gradually being adopted by colleges and schools with easier-to-use projectors. The company had already been involved with many Hollywood studios including Warner Bros. and boasted an operating business of $20 million leasing equipment to theaters. The headquarter offices were shared with its parent company AT&T in New York City, with the Bell Labs as the research staff and Western Electric as its manufacturer.

At first, there was much skepticism of the value of motion pictures as an educational tool in public schools, despite mogul William Fox's willingness to spend $9 million in putting projectors into the nation's classrooms. As lampooned in The New Yorker (November 9, 1929): "We doubt if any director could photograph Bunker Hill for the kiddies without stopping the fighting at least once for Major Pitcairn to sing 'Sonny Boy'. We doubt if any director could photograph a major operation without interrupting it for a mandolin solo by one of the surgeons. Also, we are troubled by the haunting dread of living in a completely canned civilization where everyone will look like Clara Bow and talk like Eddie Leonard. Without doubting Mr. Fox's honorable intention, we are nonetheless anxious to know whether the talkies are going to approach science and education the way they have approached life. We want to know whether they intend to give truth a happy ending!"

During its first year of operation, Otterson appointed "Colonel" Frederick L. Devereux as company head, along with Varney Clyde Arnspiger, a former superintendent of schools. Under Arnspiger, a special team of experts was assembled, among them researchers Howard Gay, Max Brunstetter and Miss Laura Kreiger, along with Dr. Melvin Brodshaug from Columbia University who would stay with the company for over two decades. Among others involved, Howard Stokes and Arthur Edwin Krows (famous for an earlier Yale Chronicles of America educational series) became leading production supervisors.

In its early years, ERPI had competition with both the Pathé Exchange, which entered the educational market in conjunction with Harvard University, and Eastman Teaching Films, an offspring of Eastman Kodak that had invented the 16mm format along with DuPont in 1923. The latter company had made an estimated 300 silent (with title cards) films by the 1930s (with eventually 270 silent and later sound films officially registered for copyright between 1927 and 1943). An often repeated story involved Arnsiger getting invited to an alley fist fight with an Eastman representative who feared losing a fortune with their silent films already in circulation. (Later, in the 1940s, Eastman's film library would be sold to them.)

Newark, New Jersey, was among the first public school systems to incorporate sound movie projectors in their classrooms in 1930. During the early years, projectors were often sold with films initially, until the national total reached a thousand by 1936. Until many technical problems were fixed (the best 16mm projectors were manufactured after 1933), ERPI sold both 16mm and 35mm formats.

James Brill, an artist, unofficially became narrator on the majority of ERPI films (and later many early EB films through the mid-fifties). His stentorian style made science and geography topics easy to understand for children. In 1930, he also helped supervise the company's first major series, profiling the musical instruments of an orchestra (i.e. The Brass Choir, The String Choir, The Woodwind Choir, The Percussion Group). These were all successfully reissued in later years before being redone in color in 1956.

Among the first films to be sold with text brochures to aid teachers were nature documentaries focusing on the time-lapse photography of plants and close-up footage of animals. These were credited to (George) Clyde Fisher of the American Museum of Natural History, borrowing much footage from earlier British Instructional Films. Other early films of importance included a Yale University backed Arnold Gesell covering early child development and a slow motion study of football techniques with popular coaches like Biff Jones of West Point and Harry von Kersburg of Harvard. Dr. Carey Croneis supervised some geology subjects and also worked on the science pavilion at the Century of Progress fair of 1933–34, which (in turn) inspired another newcomer, Edward Shumaker, to join the company and fine-tune the title logos. A renewed slogan read "ERPI Films bring the world to the classroom".

In the spring of 1937, ERPI scored a surprise "blockbuster" with Adventures of Bunny Rabbit. Its widespread appeal was partly due to narrator James Brill ending with a question directed towards the kindergarten and first grade students watching, one that was repeated by their teachers: "And now Bunny is once more with his mother. What do YOU think he is telling Mother Gray Rabbit – and what do YOU think Mother Rabbit is telling Bunny?" Animal pictures were among ERPI's (and later Britannica's) best sellers with popular late 1930s and 1940s titles as Three Little Kittens, Snapping Turtle and a post-war dramatization of Aesop's The Hare and the Tortoise (later redone in animation).

Geography was covered with a series called "Children of Many Lands", which compared the similarities and differences of daily life outside of the United States. A typical title like Children of Japan made sure children were seen in a classroom not unlike one at home. More exotic was Attilio Gatti's filming of the "Dark Continent" in Pygmies of Africa and Amos Burg's portrait of People of Western China shortly before the Japanese invasion. However, World War II curtailed international travel and the films of this type for a while.

John Walker got his start with 1938's Navajo Indians and remained a prolific producer through the early 1970s, with a particular emphasis in his later decades with animal subjects and a late 1960 "Problems of Conservation" series.

Back in 1932, heads Devereaux and Arnspiger had established a very close relationship with Beardsley Ruml and Robert Maynard Hutchins of the University of Chicago, providing the films the extra prestige of scholarly credits. A promotional book The Educational Talking Picture was published by Devereaux through the University in 1933, followed four years later by Max Brunstetter's How to Use the Educational Sound Film. The close relationship between ERPI and the university tightened considerably more after John Otterson had left the company to work for Paramount Pictures in 1935.

When Hutchins appointed William B. Benton as the university's vice president, his involvement with the films was much like that of a production head. By this time, the Federal Communications Commission had started pressuring the parent company AT&T to divest its highly profitable subsidiary. After an attempt to get the Rockefeller Foundation to purchase ERPI, Benton made another unsuccessful effort with Henry Luce of Life (although the magazine giant initially saw little future in educational films, Time-Life would belatedly enter the market in the 1960s).

=== Merging with Encyclopædia Britannica ===
William Benton and Robert Hutchins had established a successful relationship with chairman Colonel Robert E. Wood of the Sears, Roebuck and Company. Over a lunch meeting held December 9, 1941, Benton managed to persuade Wood to donate Sears' profitable, but aging, subsidiary Encyclopædia Britannica, Inc. to the University of Chicago outright as a tax write-off. The process of this transaction took more than a year to complete, culminating on February 1, 1943. Benton also acquired the services of EB editor Walter Yust. (His son Larry would later become a top filmmaker for the company.)

In a second move, Walter Page of AT&T and Kennedy Stevenson of Western Electric sold their interests in ERPI Classroom Films to Benton for $1 million, to be paid over the next decade. The University itself did not own the company outright, but had the option to acquire half of Benton's stock (and soon decided not to).

Benton changed the name over to Encyclopædia Britannica Films because he had once heard a school child call the films "burpy" on account of the rhyming. The first titles to sport the new name were released in November 1943. Later on, titles sported a simplified "EB Films" logo. After expanding the facilities with $1.5 million invested, William Benton temporarily left to become Assistant Secretary of State for Public Affairs under President Harry Truman, then as a senator and arch adversary of Joseph McCarthy before returning in 1952. With Beardsley Ruml mostly in charge, a prestigious board of directors was set up. Operating as president for a time was the future Ford Fund for Adult Education head Cyril Scott Fletcher.

Although production was curtailed during the war (with only two brand-new titles registered for copyright in the year 1945), profits increased dramatically as 150,000 16mm projectors were in operation by 1946. During this mid-decade period, a great many previously released titles were given new soundtracks in Spanish, French, Portuguese, Italian and other languages for foreign export.

Milan Herzog began a long association with EB in 1946 with The Mailman and other portraits of common occupations. He eventually became one of the most prolific producers. Popular titles later in the 1950s and 1960s include Tobacco and the Human Body and The Passenger Train (2nd edition), along with a series on the Soviet Union co-directed by Arnold Michaelis.

In an effort to keep the films in line with their educational goals, music scores were rarely used prior to the late 1940s and then only selectively used with a greater focus on narration. While this occasionally made them seem a bit static and lecture-like, it also prevented them from aging fast on account of changing musical tastes (a problem with rival educational films of the period).

Curiously the company was slow to make the transition to color, despite the Kodachrome 16mm process being popular with rival companies like Bailey Films and Coronet Films (starting before the war). The first color EB films were not made until 1946–47, covering painting lectures by Eliot O'Hara and scenic portraits of farm life (i.e. Spring on the Farm and Winter on the Farm). As quoted in the silver jubilee anniversary title Making Films That Teach, "Color is pretty but sometimes expensive for the teaching value you might get from it." Nonetheless, color soon became quite mainstream in the middle fifties, as EB was soon updating popular early titles with all-color remakes such as The Woodwind Choir and Spiders.

In cooperation with Emerson Films, a couple dramatic biographies on famous people were produced economically in Hollywood, marking the first time hired actors were used. For a brief period, it was decided to move forward in this route and a former movie director Walter Colmes once affiliated with Republic Pictures headed the company for a two-year period before being succeeded by Maurice B. Mitchell who would bring EB Films into its most successful years.

Although the overall quality of EB's product was already ahead of the competition, it had gained further esteem with the arrival of John Barnes, a veteran of CBS radio writing and some stage work. In 1951, Barnes collaborated with producer Gordon Weisenborn in People Along the Mississippi, one of the earliest school films to address the sticky topic of race relations. (One key scene shows a light-skinned Paul stop playing with his darker-skinned friend due to peer pressure.) Passionate about social rights, Barnes once personally protested the censorship of his biography Sir Francis Drake: The Rise of England Sea Power (featuring an interracial friendship) in Georgia schools.

Before Brown v. Board of Education (and even years after), many public schools in the United States were still segregated by race. Therefore, EB was initially reluctant to cover many social studies subjects for fear of offending top purchasers in southern U.S. states. As reported to historian Geoff Alexander, Thomas G. Smith stated as late as the 1960s: "if they were filming in a classroom and there were a couple black children in the room, they'd just frame the other way. If they had to choose several kids to be featured and the black kids were taller than the rest, they'd ask for the shorter children."

=== EB's Golden Age ===
With Maurice Mitchell leading as company supervisor (starting in 1953), business doubled to $4,500, 000 in a few short years. Westinghouse Broadcasting and Trans-Lux (which distributed some of the films on 35mm for theaters) made some of the company's catalog available to television stations for the first time. During this same period, Metro-Goldwyn-Mayer and other Hollywood studios utilized Britannica's subsidiary, Films Incorporated (owned since 1951, they later became a subsidiary of Public Media Incorporated in 1967), to handle the 16mm educational distribution of their theatrical material.

Adding to the fortunes of the educational film industry in general was the Cold War panic imposed by the Soviet launching of Sputnik, which prompted the U.S. government to spend more federal money on America's schools in an effort to keep the nation in fierce competition. In 1958, Mitchell held a special meeting in Washington, D.C., with the Senate Committee on Labor and Public Affairs to include motion pictures and other visual media in federal budgets. (He is seen lecturing on the importance of cinematic education in the following year's The Unique Contribution.) William Benton also campaigned passionately enough and helped get FCC chairman Newt Minnow, Anna Rosenberg Hoffman and Adlai Stevenson II to pressure Congress to pass the National Defense Education Act. (Stevenson soon became a chairman with Encyclopædia Britannica Enterprises and not the only high-profile politician to do so. Hubert Humphrey also joined after losing the 1968 United States presidential election.)

One of John Barnes' 1953 contributions, The Living City, earned an Academy Award nomination. The following year, he filmed a series of historical subjects in England, among them the socially conscious The Pilgrims, Captain John Smith, Founder of Virginia, and Roger Williams: Founder of Rhode Island. Some of these gained praise even by mainstream theatrical film critics who traditionally ignored school films, like Howard Thompson of The New York Times (July 3, 1955).

In addition to many artistic subjects and some of the best school films covering The Renaissance: Its Beginnings, Leonardo da Vinci and Michelangelo, he also spearheaded a "Humanities" series sponsored in part by the Ford Foundation (which had previously backed an equally ambitious, but less successful financially, Physics: The Complete Introductory Course that was co-scripted by future president Warren Everote). His coverage of Thorton Wilder's Our Town, Charles Dickens and Plato's Apology, the Life and Teachings of Socrates were all typical of Barnes' knack for making classics more entertaining to middle and high schools. Occasionally he would battle the front office for this reason, since sometimes "entertainment" was questioned in regards to "education". As Geoff Alexander profiled in a series of letters regarding his and director Douglas Campbell's treatment of Macbeth, president Maurice Mitchell had plenty to say in a letter written June 24, 1964:

I know that there are great pressures from EBF's men in the field to keep these films entertaining, to make sure that we have lots of drama and action in them, to minimize the lecturing or to clothe it in attractive terms. I have already argued this case in another memorandum—I remind you now that what happened with Macbeth is the inevitable result of a loose rein in this regard. It would be a great tragedy if the series degenerated into an entertaining Sunday evening lecture series for the whole family instead of the highly-disciplined attack on the Humanities that it started out to be.

Barnes successfully fought back.

So, if Mitch's idea is that a director cannot have anything interesting or significant to say to high school students about Shakespearean plays, he can say so of course; perhaps we ought to have got this reaction specifically to begin with on the scripts. But if he says that what Campbell has to demonstrate about Macbeth is not serious—I feel that he simply wasn't looking at the film with an open mind. Campbell's approach is highly serious. It is not at the level of beer commercial or Sunday evening lecture.

Ever the idealist, he once stated in a 1966 interview: "I have an idea—a faith, I suppose it really is—that some of my films—or a single film, or even a single sequence in a film or a shot in a film—will light up a young mind somewhere, light it up so that nothing—unsympathetic teachers, lack of a decent place to live or lack of love—can ever plunge it into darkness."

Meanwhile, William's son Charles Benton had troubles of his own, often dealing with his cautious father. He had joined in 1953 as an assistant to top producer Milan Herzog (and later vice president in the mid-1960s), moving up through the ranks by organizing the company's mailing lists. As marketer for Films Inc. (a subsidiary of EB) and later president of filming, Charles was most enthusiastic in adding both profits and prestige by outsourcing major companies like David L. Wolper and National Geographic Society under the EB banner. Neither the senior Benton nor co-head Mitchell was particularly supportive. Father to son (in a January 7, 1966 letter): "As you know, I am exceedingly uneasy about your preoccupation with products which do not carry the EBF imprimatur. I have the feeling that you hope to get something for nothing."

Charles left in 1967 (partly pressured out by the elder Benton and Mitchell) and soon convinced EB to split off Films Inc. as a separate company with him in charge. That same year saw two other upsets to the company hierarchy. Mitchell himself accepted a chancellor job with the University of Denver that summer and was replaced by the more disciplined (keeping films under budget) Warren Everote, a veteran at EB since 1946 and previously president for a short period earlier that decade.

In July 1967, William "Bill" Deneen left EBF to start up the Learning Corporation of America, a rival company with Columbia Pictures. It would quickly become one of EB's biggest rivals in the 16mm field. During his past decade with EB, William Deneen's specialty was geography films, being owner of an independent film company since 1950 that was distributing through EB until they absorbed his company and made him vice president. Among his most famous in-depth looks of everyday life overseas were a series on Japan, Hungary and Communism and a trio shot on Samuel Bronston's sets of Fall of the Roman Empire, including Claudius: Boy of Ancient Rome. These were certainly the most expensive looking school films of the era, despite being made very economically.

Despite dramatic changes in management, combined with some cost-cutting, the 1960s and early seventies produced many memorable classics. A Bill of Rights series both dramatized and explained major legal battles that school students often take for granted (examples include Freedom to Speak, People of New York Vs. Irving Feiner and Free Press Vs. Fair Trial By Jury- the Sheppard Case, latter produced by Stanley Croner). John Barnes, who also contributed to some of these, tackled Shaw vs. Shakespeare on the historical accuracy and personality of Julius Caesar; this was filmed in 1969 with the cast and sets of a failed British play Her First Roman. Larry Yust and Clifton Fadiman adapted Shirley Jackson's controversial short story The Lottery despite its shocking (for 1969 school students) ending.

In addition, throughout the late 1950s and 1960s, were a wide assortment of full color biology films covering everything from protozoa to hummingbirds to veracious army ants on the hunt; many of these were produced by John Walker and Bert Van Bork. Also of particular interest was a 1971 Silent Safari series on African animals shot by Jane and Peter Chermayeff, but ignoring the usual narration so that viewers can make their own assessments of the animals' behavior. (A second series was released a dozen years later, including ostriches and wildebeest.)

As the times changed, so did the popular subjects in demand. A large part of America's population and their history that had been overlooked before the civil rights movement finally got its due, such as Henry McNeal Turner in Bishop Turner: Black Nationalist and American Indian Speaks, the latter produced by longtime veteran Thomas G. Smith. The impact of the sexual revolution on teenagers opened the market for provocative subjects like Venereal Disease: The Hidden Epidemic, another Smith production and among the earliest to advocate condom use. This was another of EB's top sellers that the company had to keep pressing prints of, in part because of the uproar in the news media it caused with the more religious and conservative districts.

=== Post Benton Era: from 16mm movies to video to internet ===
With William Benton's death in March 1973 and ownership of Encyclopædia Britannica moving to the Benton Foundation the following year, EB's film department entered its last two "twilight" decades as the industry leader. The gradual decline of the films' market was not noticed at first since virtually every public school system was well stocked with 16mm projectors and both EB and its rivals (Coronet, Time-Life, Learning Corporation of America and others all in fierce competition) were busy keeping up with the demand. In fact, the seventies were probably the peak decade for 16mm classroom instruction, which made the rapid decline a decade later all the more surprising. VHS and Betamax video cassettes were merely a new mid-decade novelty that was only rarely used prior to the Reagan years. Although the federal government had gradually been decreasing the amount spent on education when Carter was president, it was the mid and late eighties that saw the most rapid decline as the Cold War drew to a close and the Soviet Union was no longer a threat.

After two back-to-back and very brief tenures with Jim Parton (succeeding Warren Everote) and Jack Saunders, Ross Sackett took over the same year as Benton's death. Among the popular releases of the period included Energy: A Matter of Choices (one of many ephemerals of the decade covering that "hot topic", this one produced by Charles Finance), John Barnes profiling John Keats and The Bible As Literature, a comedy pantomime series "Bip" featuring Marcel Marceau and many featurette (25+ minutes) co-productions with Avatar Learning covering earthquakes, dinosaurs and sharks. Thomas G. Smith capped off a long career with EB with the 1976–77 production of The Solar System with special computer generated effects not unlike those being used in the early Star Wars films.

Sackett was followed in 1977 as president by Ralph Wagner, who had married William Benton's daughter Louise. With a tighter eye on budgets, there were increasing clashes with the filmmakers. The star director, John Barnes, particularly did not get along well with Wagner and left soon after completing one of his most popular films, a glossy adaptation of Walter van Tilburg Clark's apocalyptic sci fi tale told in flashbacks, The Portable Phonograph.

This last film of his was part of an ongoing series of short story adaptations featuring established actors (more familiar on TV and stage) and often released with an additional "part 2" reel that covered the director's commentary on the story in question. Others included The Hunt (adapted from The Most Dangerous Game by Richard Connell), J. M. Synge's Well of the Saints and Guy de Maupassant's La Paurure. Unfortunately, these ambitious miniature dramas ultimately proved too expensive to survive into the next decade.

By 1980, VHS videos were beginning to be marketed alongside the 16mm films and would quickly overtake the other. A new problem soon erupted: teachers copying films to video and impacting the company's income. On June 25, 1982, New York's Board of Cooperative Educational Services was prosecuted for doing this not only by EB, but also Time-Life and the Learning Corporation of America. Although the film companies won, historian Geoff Alexander points out that "perhaps the most disturbing element of the case was that, more than 15 years after the halcyon days of post-Sputnik government largesse, BOCES found it financially more viable to defend a costly lawsuit than to simply buy films and tapes from film companies as it once did."

Not that educational film making showed any decline in quality as the revenue dried up. Particularly popular throughout the eighties was Bruce Hoffman's cluster of "inside the human body" titles that benefited from the ever advancing developments in microphotography combined with expert animation by David Alexovich.

Later that decade, the Benson Foundation donated all Britannica properties to the University of Chicago. Ralph Wagner left the presidency at the end of 1987, with an ex-Coronet Films Joe Elliott now taking over. By this time, 16mm films had pretty much been replaced by video cassettes although a few (mostly foreign language versions of older titles) films continued to be distributed to libraries and schools as late as 1991. Longtime vice president assistant Philip Stockton remained as vice president of film/video production under Elliott until 1994 (being succeeded by William Bowe) and kept an ongoing, if declining, annual output that included a multi-part short subject series Science Essentials (written by Gary W. Lopez, a few produced by Stockton and many featuring animation by Steve Boyer), Viruses: What They Are And How They Work (a latter day production from veteran Bert Van Bork, written by Gary Lopez, with animation by Bill Gudmundson), 'Problems of Conversation Series' (written and produced by Gary Lopez), Judith Conaway's For Your Baby (which continued a tradition going back the early ERPI era with Arnold Gesell), David Wood and Scott Shearer's Mathsense series and, co-produced with York Films, A Galactic Encyclopedia

The shrinking market for educational media eventually hit the company hard and production came to a halt in 1995. The University of Chicago sold its financially struggling EB properties in January 1996 to Jacqui Safra for $135 million. CEO Don Yannias, appointed the following year, refocused attention to CD-ROM and the internet (with limited DVD attention). This officially ended an era.

=== Renewed interest ===
In recent years, the higher-than-average quality of EB films have enjoyed renewed interest as some titles gradually fell into public domain and are easily viewed on YouTube and the Internet Archive. Because the company made comparatively fewer social guidance films than rivals like McGraw-Hill and Coronet (the type that are often ridiculed today with the changing social customs) and the producers were very cautious in their choices of narration and music, many of these films tend to be viewed as less "dated" today than other non-theatrical ephemerals.

== DVD compilations ==
- Our Living Earth Volume 1 UPC 798936839312: Volcano Birth of a Mountain (1977) / Fossils Exploring the Past (1978)
- Our Living Earth Volume 2 UPC 798936839329: Evolution of Landscapes (1986) / Life in the Grasslands (1978) / Aging of Lakes (1971) / The Everglades (1987)
- The Biology of Plants and Flowers UPC 798936840585: Plant Physiology (1995) / Photosynthesis (1981) / Plant Reproduction (1995)
- Animals and Insects UPC 798936840530: How Nature Protects Animals (1958) / Some Friendly Insects (1971) / Problems of Conservation: Wildlife (1970) / Animals in the City (1978)
- Wildlife Worlds UPC 798936839343: What is Ecology? (1977) / The Everglades (1987) / The Desert (1988) / Life in the Grasslands (1978) / Programs of Conservation: Wildlife (1970)
- The Amazing Human Body Volume 1 UPC 798936840561: The Human Brain (1983) / Your Eyes (1989) / Your Ears (1989) / The Skin: Its Structure and Function (1983)
- The Amazing Human Body Volume 2 UPC 798936840578: Muscles: Their Structure and Function (1986) / The Respiratory System (1987) / Work of the Heart (1987) / Genetic Fingerprinting (1992) / The Ears of King Midas (1977)
- Time Will Tell The Sun and the Moon UPC 798936839336: Reflections on Time (1970) / Eclipses of the Sun and the Moon (1989) / The Moon: A Giant Step in Geology (1975)
- Habitat Earth Landscape and Life UPC 798936839305: Evolution of Landscapes (1986) / Life in the Grasslands (1978) / Aging of Lakes (1971) / The Everglades (1987)
- H2O The Water Cycle UPC 798936839299: The Water Cycle (1979) / What Makes Clouds? (1965) / The Aging of Lakes (1971)
- Great Americans: U.S. Presidents UPC 798936840547: George Washington (1980) / Thomas Jefferson (1980) / Abraham Lincoln (1982)
- Medieval and Renaissance Europe UPC 798936840554: The Medieval Manor (1956) / Chaucer's England (1956) / Martin Luther: Beginning of Reformation (1973) / Hamlet: The Age of Elizabeth (1959)
- The Constitution of the United States UPC 798936840592: The Constitution of the United States (1982) / Thomas Paine (1975) / George Washington (1980) / Thomas Jefferson (1980)

== See also ==
- Britannica's Tales Around the World
- Educational Film
- Social guidance film
- Travel documentary
