= Trichalophus =

Scientific classification
- Kingdom: Animalia
- Phylum: Arthropoda
- Class: Insecta
- Order: Coleoptera
- Suborder: Polyphaga
- Infraorder: Cucujiformia
- Family: Curculionidae
- Tribe: Alophini
- Genus: Trichalophus; LeConte, 1876

Genus of beetles

Trichalophus is a genus of broad-nosed weevils in the beetle family Curculionidae. There are more than 50 described species in Trichalophus.

== Species ==
These 58 species belong to the genus Trichalophus:

- Trichalophus albonotatus (Motschulsky, 1860)
- Trichalophus alternans (Say, 1831)
- Trichalophus alternatus (Say, 1831)
- Trichalophus arcuatus Fall, 1907
- Trichalophus arrogatus (Faust, 1883)
- Trichalophus arrogatusurbanus (Faust, 1883)
- Trichalophus boeberi (Schoenherr, 1826)
- Trichalophus brunneus Van Dyke, 1927
- Trichalophus caudiculatus (Fairmaire, 1886)
- Trichalophus cinereus (Ballion, 1878)
- Trichalophus constrictus (LeConte, 1857)
- Trichalophus didymus (LeConte, 1856)
- Trichalophus eximius (Faust, 1885)
- Trichalophus ferganensis Reitter, 1913
- Trichalophus foveirostris Chittenden, 1925
- Trichalophus globicollis Reitter, 1913
- Trichalophus granicollis (Van Dyke, 1927)
- Trichalophus humeralis (Gebler, 1834)
- Trichalophus hylobinus (LeConte, 1876)
- Trichalophus incarinatus Reitter, 1913
- Trichalophus juldusanus Reitter, 1913
- Trichalophus kashgarensis (Faust, 1887)
- Trichalophus korotyaevi Zherikhin & Nazarov, 1990
- Trichalophus krauseanus Bajtenov, 1975
- Trichalophus latefasciatus Reitter, 1913
- Trichalophus lentus (Faust, 1883)
- Trichalophus leucon (Mannerheim, 1834)
- Trichalophus lineatus (Gebler, 1841)
- Trichalophus lituratus (Faust, 1881)
- Trichalophus lixomorphus Bajtenov, 1974
- Trichalophus maklini (Faust, 1890)
- Trichalophus marginatus (Faust, 1886)
- Trichalophus multivittatus Reitter, 1913
- Trichalophus nigrofemoralis Reitter, 1913
- Trichalophus nutakkanus Kono, 1936
- Trichalophus ocularis Reitter, 1913
- Trichalophus pacatus (Faust, 1890)
- Trichalophus planirostris LeConte, 1876
- Trichalophus pubifer Reitter, 1913
- Trichalophus quadrifasciatus Faust, 1881
- Trichalophus quadriguttatus (Gebler, 1829)
- Trichalophus quadripunctatus Kraatz, 1884
- Trichalophus regularis Reitter, 1913
- Trichalophus rubripes Zherikhin & Nazarov, 1990
- Trichalophus rudis (Boheman, 1842)
- Trichalophus scylla Grebennikov, 2015
- Trichalophus seminudus Van Dyke, 1938
- Trichalophus seriatus (Mannerheim, 1853)
- Trichalophus simplex LeConte, 1876
- Trichalophus siplex Leconte, 1876
- Trichalophus stefanssoni Leng, 1919
- Trichalophus steffansoni Leng, 1919
- Trichalophus subcostatus (Ballion, 1878)
- Trichalophus subnudus (Faust, 1885)
- Trichalophus sulcirostris (Ballion, 1878)
- Trichalophus tibetanus (Suvorov, 1915)
- Trichalophus vittatoides Reitter, 1913
- Trichalophus vittatus (Faust, 1881)
