= Social guidance film =

Educational film genre

Social guidance films constitute a genre of propaganda films attempting to influence children and adults to behave in certain ways. Social guidance films, particularly popular in the mid-20th century, were designed to address various social issues and promote positive behavior among audiences, especially young people. Often produced by government agencies or educational institutions, these films tackled topics such as peer pressure, substance abuse, and moral decision-making, using relatable narratives and characters to convey their messages. Produced by the U.S. government as "attitude-building films" during World War II, the genre grew to be a common source of indoctrination in elementary and high school classrooms in the United States from the late 1940s to the early 1970s. The films covered topics including courtesy, grammar, social etiquette and dating, personal hygiene and grooming, health and fitness, civic and moral responsibility, sexuality, child safety, national loyalty, racial and social prejudice, juvenile delinquency, drug use, and driver safety; the genre also includes films for adults, covering topics such as marriage, business etiquette, general safety, home economics, career counseling and how to balance budgets. A subset is known as hygiene films addressing mental hygiene and sexual hygiene.

== History ==
Social guidance films were typically produced by educational filmmakers, government agencies, and private organizations, reflecting the postwar anxiety over social change and the desire for conformity in an era of rapid modernization. These films were often produced by corporations such as Coronet Instructional Films, Centron Corporation for Young America Films, Encyclopædia Britannica Films, and occasionally by better-known companies such as Ford Motor Company and Crawley Films for McGraw-Hill Book Company. Many were made by independent producers, most notably the prolific maverick independent filmmaker Sid Davis. Few of these films featured notable actors, and only a few were produced by a major Hollywood studio, such as the films made by Walt Disney Productions and Warner Bros. In rare instances, the films were sponsored by a major company such as Kotex or General Motors. Ken Smith, in his seminal 1999 book on the genre, Mental Hygiene: Classroom Films 1945 - 1970, estimates that there were "around three thousand" films made that fall into the "social guidance" film genre. Aimed at schoolchildren, the films used a combination of didactic storytelling and visual imagery to impart moral lessons, promoting ideals such as proper conduct, emotional control, and the American dream.

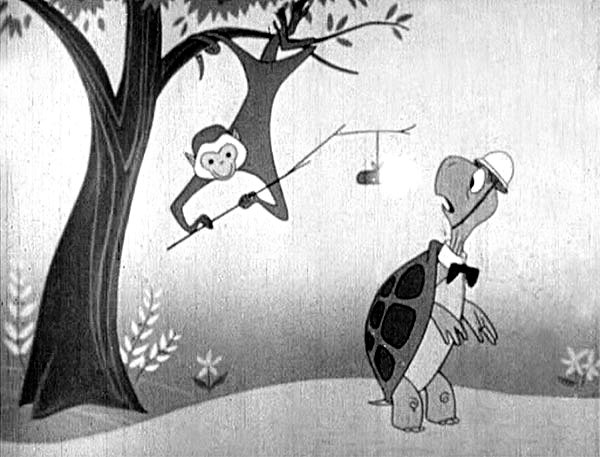
Duck and Cover, 1952 film

While many of the films were merely instructional (like 1941's Posture and Exercise, 1949's Posture and Personality and 1952's Duck and Cover), others ended with an invitation for a classroom discussion of the topic (1956's What About Alcoholism?; 1959's What About Prejudice?), whereas others were presented as striking cautionary tales (1959's Signal 30; 1961's Seduction of the Innocent; 1967's Narcotics: Pit of Despair).

== Description ==
Social guidance films discussed issues such as etiquette in regards to family, school and dating. Studios such as Coronet films strayed away from voice-over and portrayed their social guidance films by having their protagonist play out real life scenarios as a way to connect with their audience. Often, these films portrayed a life of the "ideal Human", this would fall along the lines of the model of nuclear families. With a mix of drama and instructional content, they aimed to foster a sense of community responsibility and personal integrity. While their simplistic portrayals and moralistic tones may seem dated today, these films reflect a cultural effort to navigate the complexities of social norms and encourage ethical conduct in an evolving society.

Social guidance films address their audience to relate with their protagonist. Protagonist or social guidance films are typically depicted as part of the white, middle-class, ignoring and prioritizing other identities. The antithesis of social guidance films, these works served as tools of social control and social engineering, designed to help shape the behavioral patterns of young audiences.

== Reception and goal ==
Social guidance films were accessible for people of all ages. They were typically shown to children in schools. These films were included into the classrooms and utilized to create class discourse. Social guidance films were used so extensively in classrooms that only a few of these films remain today. When a film reel would be too damaged to be played in the classrooms, educators would dispose of them and order newer reels from production companies. The overall goal of the social guidance films was to help shape younger generations to stay within accepted social boundaries. Although sometimes viewed as conservative or reactionary by today's standards, Smith points out that these films were not made by conservatives or reactionaries but instead "by some of the most liberal and progressive-minded people of their time." When shown in the classroom, many had felt that a teachers scope of practice should not exceed reading, writing and basic arithmetic. According to Smith, the social guidance films were viewed as harmful in more rural and poorer areas, "the moral education was seen as a territory for parents and the church."

Dating Dos and Donts (1949)

The goal of social guidance films were to provide guidance for their audience to become adapted into society and fit the mold of societal norms. Social guidance films also had a goal of control and conformity of their audience. Qualities such as self-control and temper were some of the main topics of these films. Specifically elements of control were confounded in the mental hygiene film; presenting ideologies surrounding women's appearance, child care, and home cooking. Within the goal of control, there was additionally a plan for normalcy. The lessons taught within social guidance films echoed themes of maintaining within "normal" boundaries.

== Appearances in other media ==
As films in this genre are largely in public domain, they have been used in modern productions outside of their intended purpose, usually as a means of unintentional comedy. A number of short social guidance films, such as Posture Pals (1952) and Are You Ready for Marriage? (1950), were featured and lampooned on the television comedy series Mystery Science Theater 3000 to provide padding for episodes in which the featured movie segments did not fill out the program's roughly 90-minute running time. On The Weird Al Show, clips from still other films were taken and edited together with new voiceovers to make parodies.

The 1999 feature film The Iron Giant, set in 1957, features a social guidance film-within-a-film titled Atomic Holocaust, the style and tone of which emulate 1952's Duck and Cover.

A fifth-season episode of the AMC series Mad Men, which takes place between July 1966 and August 1966, uses the title of 1959's Signal 30 as the episode title.

== See also ==
- Social problem film
- Trigger film
