= Trichalophus alternatus =

Scientific classification
- Domain: Eukaryota
- Kingdom: Animalia
- Phylum: Arthropoda
- Class: Insecta
- Order: Coleoptera
- Suborder: Polyphaga
- Infraorder: Cucujiformia
- Family: Curculionidae
- Genus: Trichalophus
- Species: T. alternatus

Binomial name
- Trichalophus alternatus (Say, 1831)

Species of beetle

Trichalophus alternatus is a species of broad-nosed weevil in the beetle family Curculionidae. It is found in North America.
