= Alophini =

Scientific classification
- Kingdom: Animalia
- Phylum: Arthropoda
- Clade: Pancrustacea
- Class: Insecta
- Order: Coleoptera
- Suborder: Polyphaga
- Infraorder: Cucujiformia
- Family: Curculionidae
- Subfamily: Entiminae
- Tribe: Alophini; LeConte, 1874

Genera
- See text

Tribe of beetles

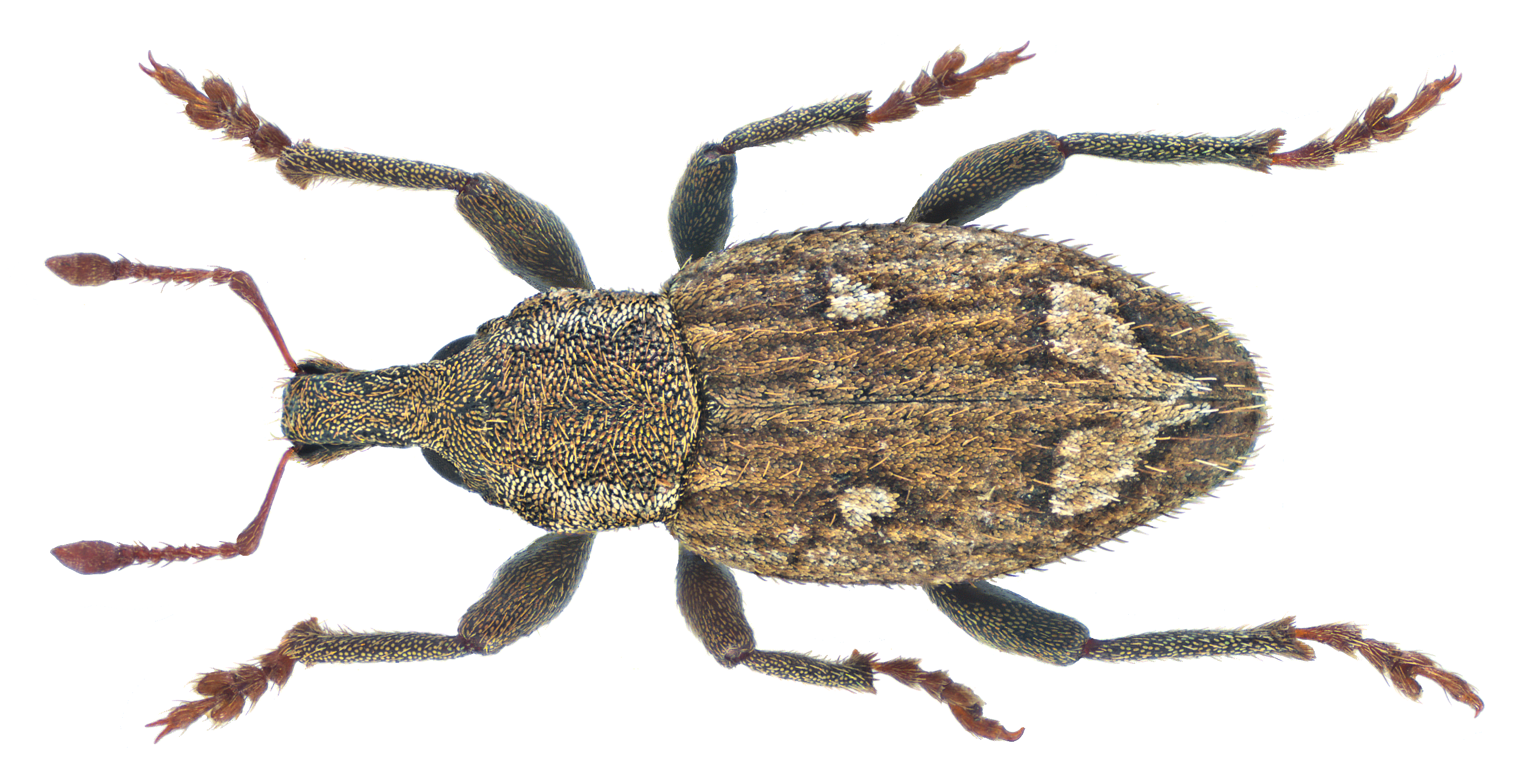
Graptus triguttatus

The Alophini are a weevil tribe in the subfamily Entiminae.

== Genera ==
- Acmaegenius
- Centron
- Ctenolobus
- Geralophus
- Graptus
- Lepidophorus
- Limalophus
- Plinthodes
- Pseudalophus
- Pseudobarynotus
- Rhytideres
- Seidlitzia
- Trichalophus
- Triglyphulus
- Xeralophus
