= Acmaegenius =

Scientific classification
- Kingdom: Animalia
- Phylum: Arthropoda
- Clade: Pancrustacea
- Class: Insecta
- Order: Coleoptera
- Suborder: Polyphaga
- Infraorder: Cucujiformia
- Superfamily: Curculionoidea
- Family: Curculionidae
- Tribe: Alophini
- Genus: Acmaegenius; LeConte, 1876

Genus of beetles

Acmaegenius is a genus of broad-nosed weevils in the beetle family Curculionidae. There are at least two described species in Acmaegenius.

== Species ==
These two species belong to the genus Acmaegenius:

- Acmaegenius granicollis Van Dyke, 1927^{i c}
- Acmaegenius hylobinus LeConte, 1876^{i c b}

Data sources: i = ITIS, c = Catalogue of Life, g = GBIF, b = Bugguide.net
