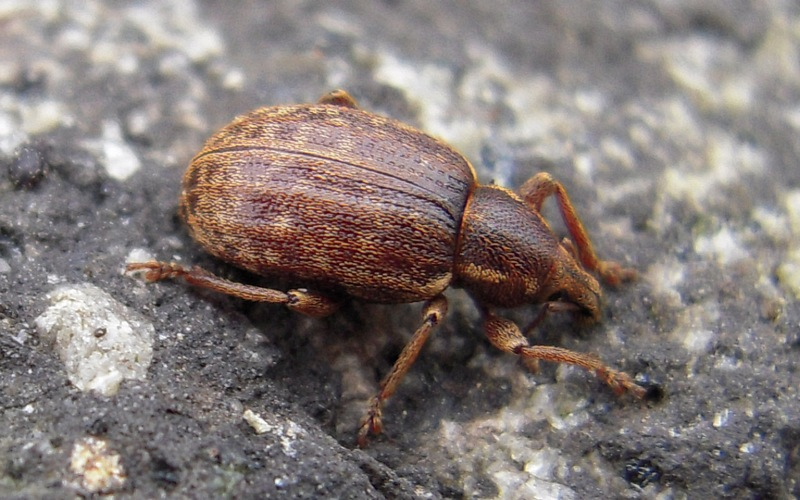
- Lepidophorus inquinatus

Scientific classification
- Domain: Eukaryota
- Kingdom: Animalia
- Phylum: Arthropoda
- Class: Insecta
- Order: Coleoptera
- Suborder: Polyphaga
- Infraorder: Cucujiformia
- Family: Curculionidae
- Genus: Lepidophorus; W. Kirby, 1837

= Lepidophorus =

Genus of beetles

Lepidophorus is a genus of broad-nosed weevils in the family Curculionidae. There are about 13 described species in Lepidophorus.

== Species ==
- Lepidophorus alternatus Van Dyke, 1930
- Lepidophorus angulatus Buchanan, 1936
- Lepidophorus bakeri Buchanan, 1936
- Lepidophorus inquinatus (Mannerheim, 1852)
- Lepidophorus lineaticollis Kirby, 1837
- Lepidophorus pilifrons Kirsh, 1889
- Lepidophorus plumosus Buchanan, 1936
- Lepidophorus pumilus Buchanan, 1936
- Lepidophorus raineri Van Dyke, 1930
- Lepidophorus rainieri Van Dyke, 1930
- Lepidophorus setiger Hamilton, 1895
- Lepidophorus thulius (Kissinger, 1974)
- Lepidophorus transmarino (Mannerheim, 1852)
