= Leo Beuerman =

1969 film

- Directed by: Gene Boomer
- Written by: Margaret Travis
- Produced by: Russell A. Mosser; Arthur H. Wolf
- Edited by: Larry Bixby
- Distributed by: Centron Productions
- Release date: 1969
- Country: United States
- Language: English

Leo Beuerman (1969)

Leo Beuerman is a 1969 American short documentary film directed by Gene Boomer. It was nominated for an Academy Award for Best Documentary Short.

== Summary ==
It tells the story of Leo Beuerman (1902 – 1974), a diminutive, disabled man who sold pencils and became a fixture on the downtown sidewalks of Lawrence, Kansas in the 1950s and 1960s thanks to his determination.

== Production ==
The film was produced by Russell A. Mosser and Arthur H. Wolf of Centron Corporation. The simple profile of a short handicapped man with his tractor in downtown Lawrence was produced on a budget of $12,000 and eventually became one of the most popular classroom films of all time, selling an impressive 2,300 prints.
