= Trigger film =

Type of educational film

A trigger film is a type of short social guidance educational film intended for student audiences. It is often presented in elementary and middle school classrooms and carry themes that are often about topics such as morality, ethics, and safety. The movies often carry a loose, disconnected, plot that intentionally lacks a conclusion or even a moral.

== Format ==
Trigger films are usually very short and only have a few scenes. They are usually not accompanied by narration or any prologue (except, perhaps, to introduce the situation), instead the audience only observes the characters' behaviors and actions.

The intention of a trigger film is to "trigger" a discussion about the short scenes presented in the movie and how the characters reacted to the situation, and how each viewer would handle that situation differently. The teacher often serves as a mediator, perhaps offering his or her own insights, but most of the discussion is left to the students.

== Example ==
A trigger film about cheating on a school test would be presented as follows:

The film would start in a classroom with the protagonist, a struggling student who would like to pass an exam. The student, worried that he will not pass the test without help, resorts to looking at a neighboring students' exam and completes it. The film ends.

Note that unlike "non-trigger" educational films about similar topics, there is no narration of what the student is doing, nor does it conclude that the student was caught and subsequently disciplined nor does it disclose if the student got a good or bad grade on the test. The film instead tries to trigger the audience to come to its own conclusions of whether it was right or wrong to copy off someone's test and whether, if the viewer was in the place of the protagonist, they would have done the same thing.

== Effectiveness ==
Studies have been conducted to determine how effective trigger films are to change students' perceptions of morality and ethics. Proponents believe trigger films succeed in invoking thoughts and conclusions that come straight from the viewer instead of having a narrator dispense the moral to students, and that lessons learned firsthand are much more valuable than lessons learned from a character in a short film. Supporters also believe that other social guidance films tended to emphasize not the morality, but the disciplinary consequences for the immoral behavior. As such, the viewers learn only not to get caught committing the behavior.

== Use in Higher Education ==
Trigger films are not only used in grade school, but also in colleges and universities; especially those curricula that greatly involve ethics, such as medical fields, law enforcement, business, and public relations.

== See also ==
- Social guidance film
- Ethics
- Morality
