= The Living City =

1953 film

- Directed by: Haskell Wexler
- Produced by: John Barnes
- Narrated by: James Brill
- Production companies: Encyclopædia Britannica Films; Twentieth Century Fund
- Release date: 1953
- Country: United States
- Language: English

The Living City is a 1953 American short documentary film about Chicago, directed by Haskell Wexler and produced by John Barnes. It is narrated by James Brill.

== Accolades ==
The film was nominated for an Academy Award for Best Documentary Short.
