= Thomas G. Smith =

American planter and politician

Member of the Virginia House of Delegates for King and Queen County
- In office December 4, 1820 – December 1822 Serving with Humphrey Walker, Francis Row, Edwin Upshaw
- Preceded by: Thomas Faulkner
- Succeeded by: Archibald R. Harwood

Member of the Virginia Senate for Essex County King William County and King and Queen Counties
- In office Nov 30, 1812 – Nov. 10, 1817
- Preceded by: John Horrice Upshaw
- Succeeded by: Thomas C. Hoomes

Member of the Virginia House of Delegates for King and Queen County
- In office December 5, 1803 – November 30, 1806 Serving with Anderson Scott, Henry Gaines
- Preceded by: Larkin Smith
- Succeeded by: Mann Page

Personal details
- Born: Thomas Gregory Smith; January 17, 1778 Westmorland County, Colony of Virginia
- Died: April 5, 1823 (aged 45) Bellevue plantation, King and Queen County
- Spouse: Ann Dabney
- Parents: Rev. Thomas Smith (father); Mary Jaquelin Smith (mother)
- Relatives: Benjamin Dabney (father and brother in law)
- Education: College of William & Mary

Military service
- Allegiance: United States
- Branch/service: Virginia Militia
- Rank: major

Thomas Gregory Smith (January 17, 1778 – April 5, 1823) was an Virginia planter, militia officer and politician in Virginia who served in both houses of the Virginia General Assembly. He represented King and Queen County in the Virginia House of Delegates both several years before and several years after the War of 1812, and Essex County, King William County and King and Queen Counties in the Virginia Senate during that conflict. One of three men of the same name to serve in the Virginia General Assembly around the turn of the 19th century, his familial relationship to Thomas Smith Jr. and Thomas Smith of nearby Gloucester County, and to Sir Thomas Smith, Treasurer of the Virginia Company in the 17th century (and namesake of Smith's Hundred on the James River) is unknown, for several indentured servants of the same common surname emigrated to Virginia in the colony's early years.

== Early life, education and family life ==
The middle son of the former Mary Jacquelin and her husband Rev. Thomas Smith (1741–1789) of Cople Parish in Westmoreland County was born during the American Revolutionary War. His name likely reflects that of his grandfather (who lived somewhat to the south in King and Queen County) as well as his elder brother who had just died as a boy. Descended from the First Families of Virginia through both parents, his family also included four sisters and a younger brother. His slightly older sister Ann was killed by falling bricks after lightning struck their house when this Thomas was a boy, but his sister Sarah became the second of three wives of attorney, planter and politician Benjamin Dabney, who owned plantations in Gloucester and King and Queen Counties and served several terms in the House of Delegates. This man ultimately married Ann Dabney, that sister's step-daughter (Dabney's daughter from his first marriage). The remaining Smith sister to reach adulthood moved to Durhamville, Tennessee after her marriage to Philip Lee. This Thomas Smith likely attended William and Mary College like his younger brother Dr. John Augustine Smith (1782–1865), because their uncle (also) John Augustine Smith was president (as would be Dr. Smith before he returned to the College of Physicians and Surgeons of New York after this man's death). In Virginia's 1787 tax census, Rev. Thomas Smith owned twenty slaves under 16 and 24 enslaved adults, as well as eight horses, 27 cattle and a four wheeled carriage.

== Career ==
By 1805 Smith lived at Bellevue plantation in King and Queen County at the mouth of Hockley Creek, which he presumably farmed using enslaved labor although many relevant tax and property records were destroyed during the Civil War decades after this man's death. The property had been acquired by his brother in law Benjamin Dabney, who moved to Gloucester County around 1803 and died in 1803.

King and Queen County voters first elected Thomas G. Smith as one of their representatives to the Virginia House of Delegates in 1803 and twice elected him and Anderson Scott, although in 1805 Henry Gaines replaced Scott. In 1812 Smith won election to the Virginia Senate, representing nearby Essex and King William Counties as well and King and Queen County. Smith again represented King and Queen County in the Virginia House of Delegates in the 1820 and 1821 sessions.

== Death and legacy ==
Smith died at Bellevue in 1823 and was probably buried there. His sister Sarah Smith Dabney Macon survived him and two husbands, dying in 1851. About 1837, shortly after his namesake (Sarah's eldest son) Thomas Gregory Smith Dabney, who operated Elmington plantation in Gloucester County, moved to Mississippi, Beverley Anderson acquired Bellevue from Edmund Ruffin, the husband of this man's daughter Mary. It remained in the Anderson family for more than a century, in what had become King and Queen County's Buena Vista district (translating his plantation's name into Spanish). Occupied by a widow, it was decrepit by 1973. Most of its outbuildings had been burned in the Civil War, but one remaining structure (used as slave quarters but perhaps the original residence of Richard Major circa 1700) was believed to be the oldest existing structure in King and Queen county.
