= List of University of Nevada, Reno people =

Over the years, the University of Nevada, Reno has had an assortment of people gain regional, national, and international prominence in various fields of study.

== Education ==
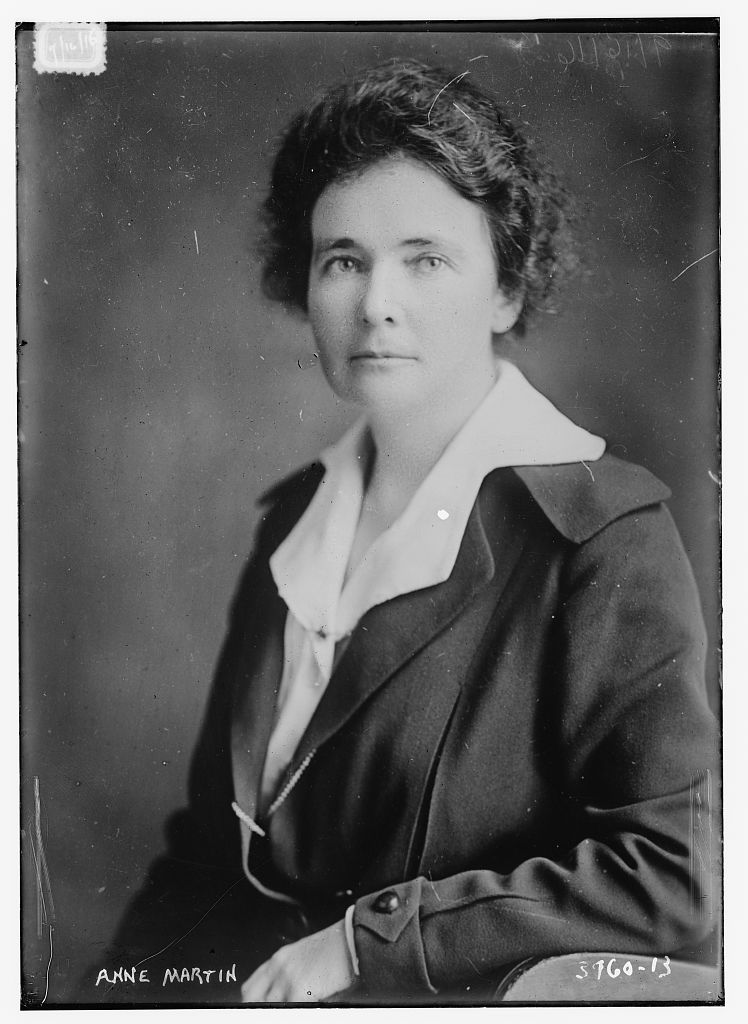
Anne Henrietta Martin

- William Dwight Billings – ecologist who served as faculty in the Department of Biology from 1938 to 1952 and is known as the father of physiological ecology and for his contributions in desert and arctic ecology; in 1989, received the Nevada medal presented by Governor Bob Miller
- Bryan E. Bledsoe – clinical professor, School of Medicine Emergency Department; emergency physician, University Medical Center
- T. Brian Callister – associate professor, Internal Medicine; physician; health care quality and policy expert
- James E. Church – best known for having developed the Mount Rose snow sampler (1906), the first instrument for measuring snow water content
- Nellie Shaw Harnar – historian of Native American history
- Steven C. Hayes – foundation professor, clinical psychology; developer of acceptance and commitment therapy; also known for his work on relational frame theory
- John Marini, professor of political science at the University of Nevada, Reno and senior fellow at the Claremont Institute
- Anne Henrietta Martin – established the university's department of history; first woman to run for the United States Senate
- James Richardson – sociologist, critic of "cultic brainwashing" theories
- Wolfram Samlowski – clinical professor of medicine; member of the Research Developmental Therapeutics and Genitourinary Committees for the US Oncology Network
- James G. Scrugham – professor of mechanical engineering, 1903-1914; dean, 1914-1917; served as governor, representative, and senator from Nevada
- C. Richard Tracy – professor of biology; director of the Biological Resources Research Center; Vada Trimble Outstanding Mentor (1999); UNR Graduate Advisor of the Year (2008); Nevada System of Higher Education Most Outstanding Graduate Advisor (2008)
- Glenn Wilson – adjunct professor of Psychology, 1994–2002; taught and established the field of psychology for performing artists; produced the standard text on the topic
- Esmail Zanjani – in 2007, led scientists at the School of Medicine and created a sheep with 15% human cells and 85% animal cells, the world's first "human-sheep chimera", which has the body of a sheep but half-human organs

== Arts and media ==
- Myram Borders – UPI bureau chief and reporter, Las Vegas News Bureau chief
- Johanna Burton – director of the Museum of Contemporary Art, Los Angeles
- Walter Van Tilburg Clark – author of The Ox-Bow Incident
- Gabriel Damon – actor, RoboCop 2, Newsies
- Frederic Joseph DeLongchamps, 1904 – Nevada State Architect, 1919–1926
- Charley Douglass, 1933 – sound engineer, created the first TV laugh track
- Peter Epstein – jazz musician, alto saxophone
- Grant Harvey – actor, The Secret Life of the American Teenager
- Kane Hodder (attended) – stuntman and actor known for role as Jason Voorhees
- Jamie Iredell – writer, author of Last Mass
- Lorie Line – classical pianist; performer and composer
- William D. Lutz, Ph.D. 1971 – author of The World of Doublespeak
- Nick Rattigan – singer-songwriter in Surf Curse and Current Joys
- Francine Rivers – novelist
- Peter Santenello – videomaker, traveler and entrepreneur
- Geoff Schumacher, 1981 – journalist and author, Howard Hughes: Power, Paranoia & Palace Intrigue
- Cathy Scott – adjunct journalism instructor, 2000–2005; journalist and true-crime author, The Killing of Tupac Shakur
- Benjamin Wade – reality television personality
- Daliah Wachs talk show host, media personality, author
- Claire Vaye Watkins – author of Battleborn
- Dolora Zajick – opera mezzo-soprano

== Politics and public service ==
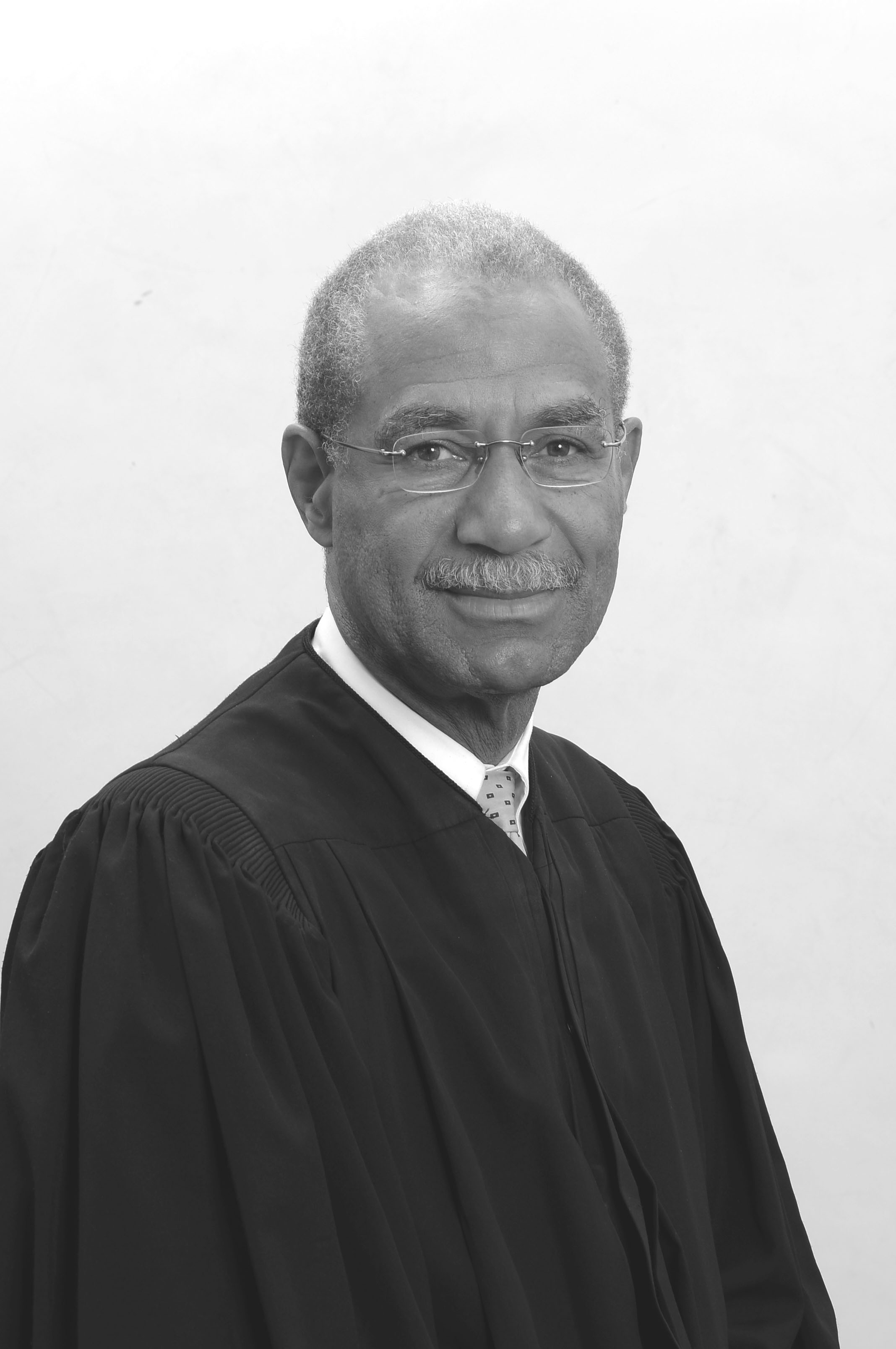
Judge Gershwin A. Drain

- Mark E. Amodei – current U.S. representative from Nevada, Nevada State Assembly, 1996–1998; Nevada State Senate, 1998–2010
- Thomas Atkinson – former mayor of Green Bay, Wisconsin
- Helen Delich Bentley – former congresswoman from Maryland
- Alan Bible, 1930 – U.S. senator from Nevada (1954–1974)
- Emmet D. Boyle, 1898 – former governor of Nevada
- Ernest S. Brown, 1926 – U.S. senator from Nevada
- Richard Bryan, 1959 – former governor of Nevada and US senator (Alpha Tau Omega)
- Catherine Cortez Masto, 1986 – current U.S. senator; first Latina U.S. senator; former attorney general of Nevada
- Frankie Sue Del Papa, 1971 – first female Nevada state attorney general; first female secretary of state
- Gershwin A. Drain – U.S. federal judge
- Frank J. Fahrenkopf, Jr., 1962 – chairman of the Republican National Committee; 1983–1989 American Gaming Association chairman; currently co-chairman of the Commission on Presidential Debates, which conducts the United States general election presidential and vice presidential debates in presidential election years (Alpha Tau Omega)
- Jason Frierson – current U.S. attorney from the District of Nevada; Nevada State Assembly, 2016-2022; Nevada State Assembly, 2011-2015; Nevada Speaker of the Assembly, 2017-2022 (Kappa Alpha Psi)
- Jim Gibbons – 28th governor of Nevada (Sigma Nu)
- Matt Griffin – current deputy secretary of State of Nevada (Alpha Tau Omega)
- Steven Horsford – current U.S. representative from Nevada and chair of the Congressional Black Caucus; Nevada State Senate, 2005-2013; Nevada State Senate Majority Leader, 2009-2013
- Procter Ralph Hug, Jr. – judge, Court of Appeals for the Ninth Circuit (Alpha Tau Omega)
- Myron E. Leavitt, 1952 – lieutenant governor of Nevada; justice, Nevada Supreme Court
- Sheila Leslie, 1979 – M.A. in Spanish Language and Literature; current member of the Nevada State Assembly representing AD 27 (Washoe County)
- Pat McCarran, attended but did not graduate – Democratic United States senator from Nevada, 1933-1954; noted for his strong anti-Communist stance
- Donald R. Mello – Democratic member of the Nevada Assembly
- William Raggio – former Nevada state senator (Alpha Tau Omega)
- Clark L. Reber – member of the Utah House of Representatives
- Sig Rogich, 1967 – political adviser to President Reagan and Bush; former US Ambassador to Iceland (Sigma Alpha Epsilon)
- Brian Sandoval, 1986 – former U.S. District Court judge and former governor of Nevada (Sigma Alpha Epsilon)
- James David Santini – U.S. representative from Nevada (Alpha Tau Omega)
- Grant Sawyer – former governor of Nevada (Alpha Tau Omega)
- Robin L. Titus – Republican member of the Nevada Assembly
- Harvey Whittemore – lawyer, businessman, lobbyist
- Jason Woodbury, 1995 – former district attorney of Carson City, Nevada, current judge of the First District of Nevada Department I

== Sports ==
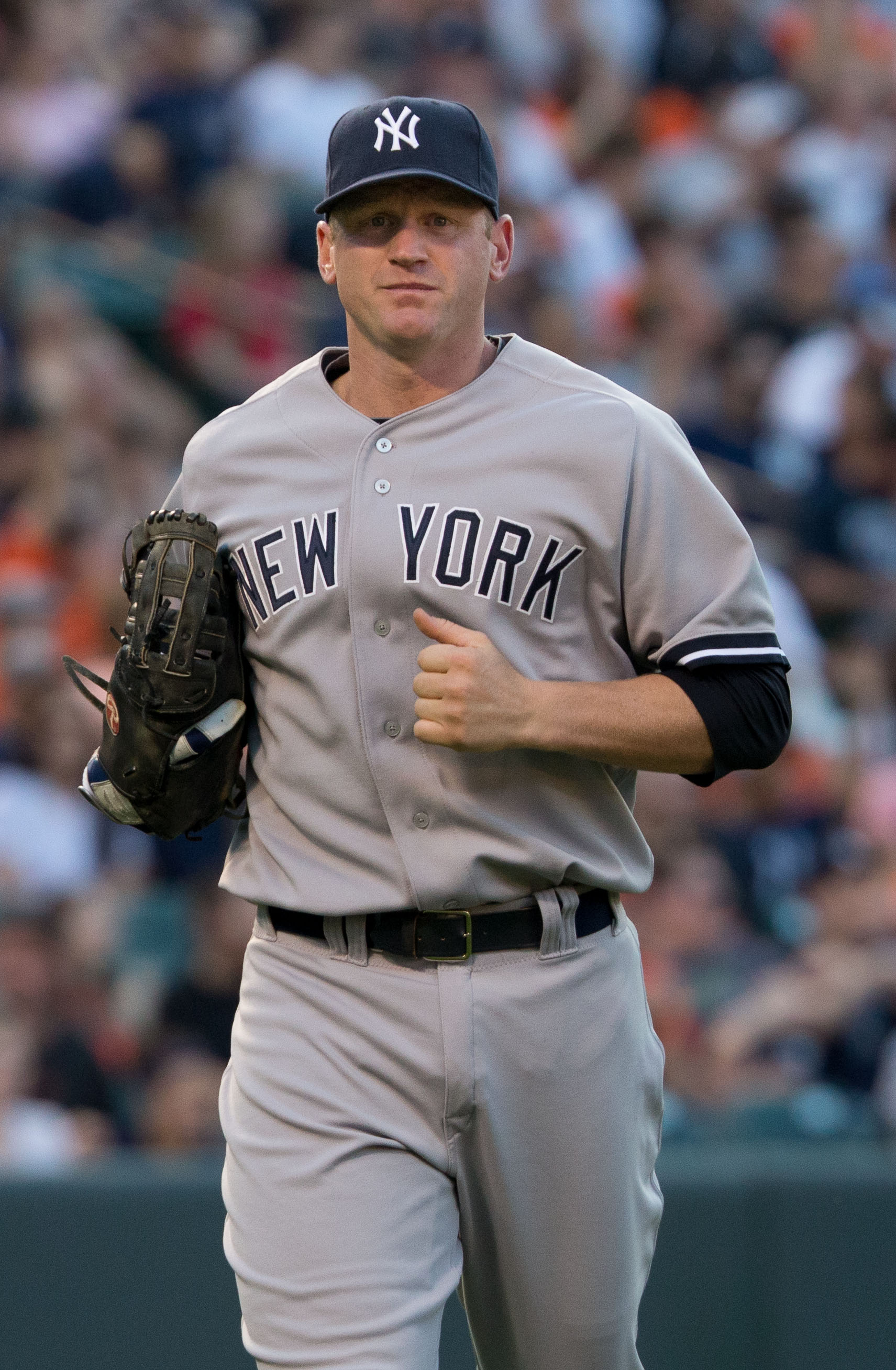
Lyle Overbay

- Chris Ault, 1969 – former head coach of Wolf Pack football team (Sigma Alpha Epsilon)
- Rob Awalt – professional football player; transferred after his first season
- Luke Babbitt (class of 2012; left in 2010) – basketball player, Miami Heat
- Eric Beavers – professional football player
- Doug Betters, 1977 – professional football player and Pro Bowler, Miami Dolphins
- Joel Bitonio, 2014 – professional football player, Cleveland Browns
- Nate Burleson, 2003 – wide receiver, Detroit Lions
- Kaelin Burnett, 2012 – professional football player
- Gina Carano (attended) – retired professional mixed martial artist; actress, television personality, and fitness model
- Ryan Church, 2000 – former Major League Baseball outfielder, New York Mets
- Todd Clever, 2004 – international rugby player
- Jorge Cordova – professional football player
- Andy Dominique, 1996–1997 – former Major League Baseball player
- Forey Duckett – professional football player
- Cody Fajardo – quarterback for the Saskatchewan Roughriders
- Nick Fazekas, 2007 – basketball player, Denver Nuggets
- Lucius Floyd, 1987 – Canadian Football League player, Grey Cup champion.
- Isaiah Frey, 2012 – professional football player
- Joseph Salvatore Gilbert – boxer on reality tv show The Contender (Sigma Alpha Epsilon)
- Virgil Green, 2011 – professional football player, Denver Broncos
- Bob Hamm – NFL player
- Frank Hawkins, 1981 – NFL running back, Oakland/Los Angeles Raiders, 1981–87
- Stan Heath, 1949 – first NCAA quarterback to throw for more than 2,000 yards in a season
- Terry Hermeling – former offensive lineman for the Washington Commanders
- Jeff Horton, 1958 – NFL assistant coach, St. Louis Rams
- Dario Hunt (born 1989) – basketball player for Hapoel Haifa of the Israeli Basketball Premier League
- Joe Inglett, 1997–2000 – former Major League Baseball player, Toronto Blue Jays
- Trevor Insley, 1999 – NCAA Division I-A all-time receiving yards leader
- Bill Ireland, 1960–67 – "father of UNLV Athletics", graduated from University of Nevada, Reno (Alpha Tau Omega)
- James-Michael Johnson, 2012 – professional football player, Kansas City Chiefs
- Edgar Jones, 1979 – former professional basketball player, drafted by the Milwaukee Bucks in 1979.
- Colin Kaepernick, 2011 – NFL quarterback, San Francisco 49ers, 2017 Time "Person of the Year" Finalist (Kappa Alpha Psi)
- Kevin Kouzmanoff, 2003 – former Major League Baseball player, Oakland Athletics
- Mills Lane, 1963 – NCAA boxing champion, boxing referee, lawyer, judge
- Mike Legarza, 1983 – leadership coach, public speaker, basketball coach
- Lisé Mackie, 1995–1998 – 1996 Olympic swimming bronze medalist (800m freestyle relay team, Australia)
- Charles Mann, 1980–82 – former professional football player and Pro Bowler, Washington Redskins
- Brock Marion, 1989–92 – professional football player, Detroit Lions
- Brandon Marshall, 2012 – professional football player, Denver Broncos
- Rishard Matthews, 2012 – professional football player
- Vladimir Matyushenko, 1999 – retired mixed martial artist formerly fighting in the UFC and Bellator MMA
- Josh Mauga, 2009 – professional football player
- JaVale McGee, 2008 – professional basketball player, Washington Wizards, Denver Nuggets, Philadelphia 76ers, Golden State Warriors, Los Angeles Lakers, Cleveland Cavaliers, and currently on the Phoenix Suns
- Corky Miller, 1997–1998 – former Major League Baseball catcher, Chicago White Sox
- Marko Mitchell, 2009 – professional football player with Washington Redskins
- Dontay Moch, 2011 – professional football player, Tennessee Titans
- Marion Motley, 1940–42 – professional Football Hall of Famer
- David Neill, 1999–2002 – set the NCAA freshman record for most touchdown passes in a season
- Lyle Overbay, 1996–1999 – former Major League Baseball first baseman, Toronto Blue Jays
- Cameron Oliver, 2015–2017 – basketball power forward/center in the Israeli Basketball Premier League
- Krysta Palmer, 2012-2016 – 2020 Olympics bronze medalist in diving (3-m springboard)
- Dodie Post, 1947 – Olympic skier
- Shar Pourdanesh, 1989–1992 – professional football player, NFL 1996–2001; CFL 1994, 1995
- Chad Qualls, 1999–2000 – former Major League Baseball pitcher, Arizona Diamondbacks
- Darrell Rasner, 2000–2002 – former Major League Baseball pitcher, New York Yankees
- Jeff Rowe, 2007 – professional football player, New England Patriots
- Ramon Sessions, 2007 – professional basketball player, Milwaukee Bucks, April 2008 NBA Rookie of the Month
- Grant Sherfield (born 1999) – basketball player in the Israeli Basketball Premier League
- Chris Singleton, 1992–1993 – former Major League Baseball outfielder, current ESPN commentator
- Kirk Snyder, 2004–2011 – basketball player, Minnesota Timberwolves
- Cal Stevenson (born 1996) – baseball outfielder for the San Francisco Giants
- Zach Sudfeld, 2013 – professional football player
- Domingo Tibaduiza, 1974 – elite long distance runner
- Kirk Triplett – professional PGA Tour golfer
- Duke Williams, 2013 – professional football player, Buffalo Bills
- Khalid Wooten, 2013 – professional football player
- Charles Wright – professional wrestler (gimmicks included The Godfather, Kama, and Papa Shango)
- Tony Zendejas, 1983 – professional football player

== Other notables ==
- Alice Baltzelle Addenbrooke – historian and clubwoman
- Bill Boyd – businessman and co-founder of Boyd Gaming
- Susan Desmond-Hellmann – CEO of the Bill & Melinda Gates Foundation, first woman to hold position of chancellor at University of California, San Francisco (UCSF)
- John Etchemendy – philosopher and Stanford provost
- Jennifer Harman – professional poker player; first woman to win two bracelets in World Series of Poker open events
- Laurie Helgoe – clinical psychologist, educator
- Diane Kennedy – CPA, speaker, and financial writer
- Charlton Laird – linguist and writer; created the 1971 edition of the Webster's New World Thesaurus, which became the standard edition still used today
- Adriano B. Lucatelli – Swiss entrepreneur and investor in the financial services industry
- Jennifer Mabus – YouTuber, hiker
- Irena Scott – author and physiologist
- Ron Toomer, 1961 – developed the first upside-down roller coaster, the Corkscrew
- Washoe – first chimpanzee to successfully learn American Sign Language

== See also ==
- List of people from Reno, Nevada
