= List of people from Reno, Nevada =

The following is a list of people from Reno, Nevada:

- Amadour, artist, musician, writer
- Mädchen Amick, actress, Twin Peaks, Sleepwalkers, Dream Lover, Riverdale
- Chris Ault, Hall of Fame NCAA football coach, retired head coach of University of Nevada, Reno Wolf Pack
- Luke Babbitt, basketball player for Miami Heat, previously Portland Trail Blazers 2010–2013
- Ryan Bader, professional MMA artist and heavyweight champion of Bellator MMA
- Shannon Bahrke, skier, silver medalist at 2002 Winter Olympics, bronze medalist at 2010 Winter Olympics, and 2003 World Cup champion
- Raymond Belknap (1967-1985) suicide, one of the two subjects with fellow participant James Vance of the 1990 subliminal messages civil trial held in the city against heavy metal's Judas Priest
- Brent Boyd, pro football player of Minnesota Vikings
- Johanna Burton, director of the Museum of Contemporary Art, Los Angeles
- T. Brian Callister, physician and health care quality expert
- Chris Carr, pro football player
- Bob Cashell, former mayor of Reno and lieutenant governor
- Walter Van Tilburg Clark, author of The Ox-Bow Incident
- Doug Clifford, Creedence Clearwater Revival drummer
- Kimberley Conrad, Playboy Playmate of the Year (1989), Hugh Hefner's second ex-wife
- Heidi Cortez, Sunset Tan, The Howard Stern Show
- David Coverdale, singer-songwriter, former frontsinger of heavy metal's Deep Purple and Whitesnake
- Gabriel Damon, actor
- Joe Flanigan, actor
- Rudy Galindo, figure skater
- Matt Gallagher, author and Iraq War veteran
- Bud Gaugh, drummer of the band Sublime
- Jim Gibbons, former governor and U.S. representative
- Mark Gilmartin, golfer, entrepreneur
- Garrett Hampson, professional baseball player
- Sean Hamilton (Hollywood Hamilton), nationally syndicated radio personality
- Curtis Hanson, producer-director of films 8 Mile, L.A. Confidential, The Hand That Rocks the Cradle
- Jennifer Harman, professional poker player
- Wilder W. Hartley (1901–1970), Los Angeles City Council member, 1939–1941, born in Reno
- Martin Heinrich, U.S. senator from New Mexico since 2013; was considered for vice president for nominee Hillary Clinton for the 2016 election
- Procter Ralph Hug, Jr., federal judge
- Terri Ivens, actress on All My Children
- Kevin Jepsen, professional baseball player, attended Bishop Manogue High School
- Armon Johnson, professional basketball player
- Colin Kaepernick, football quarterback, University of Nevada, Reno and San Francisco 49ers
- Mike Krukow, MLB pitcher and broadcaster, Reno resident
- Mills Lane, boxing referee, district judge, television personality on Judge Mills Lane
- Adam Laxalt, former Nevada attorney general
- Paul Laxalt, former governor and U.S. senator from Nevada
- Greg LeMond, former professional road racing cyclist, three-time winner of the Tour de France
- Greg London, entertainer
- Jeremy Loughman, Irish professional rugby union player, born in Reno
- Jennifer Mabus, YouTuber, hiker
- Julia Mancuso, skier, Olympic gold medalist 2006
- Rich Marotta, boxing commentator, Los Angeles radio personality
- Anne Henrietta Martin, first woman to run for U.S. Senate
- Pat McCarran, U.S. senator, namesake of McCarran International Airport
- April Meservy, singer-songwriter
- Tom Mylan, butcher, author
- Jessica Nigri, cosplay celebrity, promotional model, YouTuber, voice actress and fan convention interview correspondent
- Frank Herbert Norcross, judge
- Roger Norman, off-road racer and owner of Norman Motorsports
- Ivan Passer, director
- Carl Ravazza, bandleader and talent agent
- Red Leather, rock/country singer
- Stephanie Rovetti, professional rugby player and bronze medalist 2024 Olympics, attended Reno High School
- Chuck Ruff, drummer, Edgar Winter Group
- Brian Sandoval, former governor
- Gene Savoy, Peru explorer, discoverer of Vilcabamba, Gran Pajaten, Gran Vilaya, Gran Saposoa
- Nate Schierholtz, professional baseball player, born in Reno
- Hillary Schieve, mayor of Reno
- Will Schusterick, professional disc golfer and three-time winner of the United States Disc Golf Championship
- Jason-Shane Scott, soap opera actor
- Ken Shamrock, mixed martial artist, UFC Hall of Famer, professional wrestler
- Simons & Cameron (Gordon Simons and Lane Cameron), singers and songwriters
- Jeanmarie Simpson, theatre and film artist, peace activist, founder of the Nevada Shakespeare Company and Universal Access Productions
- Shannyn Sossamon, actress in A Knight's Tale, 40 Days and 40 Nights and The Rules of Attraction
- Kevin Stadler, pro golfer, born in Reno
- David Taylor, American freestyle and folkstyle wrestler, won gold medal at 2020 Summer Olympics, current head coach of Oklahoma State
- Inga Thompson, professional cyclist
- Domingo Tibaduiza, elite long distance runner
- Kyle Van Noy, professional football player, born in Reno
- James Vance (1965-1988), suicide, another subject with fellow suicide Raymond Belknap in 1990 subliminal messages civil trial against heavy metal's Judas Priest
- Willy Vlautin, novelist, lead vocalist and songwriter for alt-country band Richmond Fontaine
- J. Buzz Von Ornsteiner, forensic psychologist, television personality
- Michael Weiss, competitive swimmer
- Dawn Wells, Miss Nevada 1959, actress on TV series Gilligan's Island
- Joe Wieland, professional baseball player
- Duke Williams, professional football player
- Gabby Williams, French-American professional basketball player, bronze medalist at Tokyo 2020 and silver medalist at Paris 2024
- Taylor Wilson, nuclear scientist; previously held record for being youngest person to achieve nuclear fusion
- David Wise, five-time World Cup medalist and Olympic gold medalist in half pipe skiing
- Dolora Zajick, dramatic mezzo-soprano

== See also ==
- List of University of Nevada, Reno people
