= Walter Clark =

Walter Clark may refer to:

- Walter Clark (Canadian politician) (1890–1987), Canadian politician, served in the Legislative Assembly of Manitoba
- Bill Clark (screenwriter) (Walter Clark, born 1944), American police detective and television writer and producer
- Walter Eli Clark (1869–1950), American politician, governor of Alaska
- Walter Clark (judge) (1846–1924), North Carolina jurist
- Walter Van Tilburg Clark (1909–1971), American author of short stories, poetry and novels
- Walter Ernest Clark (1873–1955), president of the University of Nevada, father of Walter Van Tilburg Clark
- Walter Leighton Clark (1859–1935), American businessman, inventor and artist
- Walter Eugene Clark (1881–1960), American philologist
- Walter H. Clark (1902–1994), professor of psychology of religion at Andover Newton Theological School
- Walter Appleton Clark (1876–1906), artist and illustrator
- Walter Hugh Clark (1929–2017), member of the South Carolina House of Representatives
- Wally Clark (zoologist) (Walter Clive Clark), New Zealand zoologist

== See also ==
- Wally Clark (disambiguation)
- Walter Clarke (disambiguation)
- Edward Walter Clark Jr. (1857–1946), Philadelphia businessman and banker
