= Wallace Clark (disambiguation) =

Wallace Clark (1926–2011) was a British sailor, author and businessman from Northern Ireland.

Wallace Clark can also refer to

- Wallace H. Clark Jr. (1924–1997), pathologist, cancer researcher
- Henry Wallace Clark (1880–1948), American consulting engineer
- Wally Clark (English footballer) (Wallace Clark, 1896–1975), English professional footballer
- Wallace Clark (baseball)

== See also ==
- Wallace Clark Award
- Wally Clark (disambiguation)
- Walter Clarke (disambiguation)
