= Legarza =

Legarza is a surname. Notable people with the surname include:

- Mike Legarza, American basketball coach
- Vince Legarza, American basketball coach
