= Senator Mello =

Senator Mello may refer to:

- Donald R. Mello (born 1934), Nevada State Senate
- Heath Mello (born 1979), Nebraska State Senate
- Henry J. Mello (1924–2004), California State Senate

== See also ==
- Bob Mellow (born 1943), Pennsylvania State Senate
