= Charles Potter =

Charles Potter may refer to:

- Charles E. Potter (1916–1979), U.S. Representative and Senator from Michigan
- Charles Potter (philosopher) (1634–1663), English philosopher
- Charles Potter (entomologist) (1907–1989), English entomologist
- Charles Francis Potter (1885–1962), American Unitarian minister, theologian and author
- Tommy Potter (Charles Thomas Potter, 1918–1988), jazz double bass player
- Charles Brandon Potter (born 1982), American voice actor, ADR director, and script writer
- Chuck Potter, character in The Rage: Carrie 2
- Charles Potter Jr., American politician and member of the Delaware House of Representatives
- Charles N. Potter (1852–1927), Justice of the Wyoming Supreme Court
- Charles Potter (cricketer) (1851–1895), English cricketer
