= Wally Clark =

Wally Clark may refer to:

- Wally Clark (Australian footballer) (born 1936), Australian rules footballer
- Wally Clark (English footballer) (1896–1975), English association football (soccer) forward
- Wally Clark (zoologist) (1927–2019), New Zealand zoologist

== See also ==
- Wallace Clark (1926–2011), Northern Irish sailor and writer
- Walter Clark (disambiguation)
