= The Watchful Gods and Other Stories =

1950 book by Walter Van Tilburg Clark

First edition (publ. Random House)

The Watchful Gods and Other Stories is a collection of fictional stories by Walter Van Tilburg Clark that was first published in 1950. The book contains several short stories, as well as a single novella (the title story). Three of the stories had already appeared in the annual anthology of O. Henry Award-winning stories, most notably "The Wind and the Snow of Winter" which was selected by that anthology in 1945 as their "first-place winner." Since this book's publication, two other stories have remained notable: "The Portable Phonograph" and "Hook" have both been widely anthologized since they were published.

The Watchful Gods and Other Stories is the only short story collection that Clark ever published. Along with a few of the stories in this book, Clark is most well-known for his first novel, the classic Western The Ox-Bow Incident, which was published in 1940.

== Contents ==
The stories in the book appear in the following sequence:

- "Hook" (Atlantic Monthly, August 1940)
- "The Wind and the Snow of Winter" (Yale Review, Winter 1945) (Note: The narrative strings together various memories that filter through the mind of Mike Braneen as he makes his way into the town of Gold Rock for the winter: "Braneen spends eight months of every year—from April to December—in the mountains, and when the first snow falls he takes refuge in the little mining town of Gold Rock. For eight months, Mike is alone, with only his burro for company. However, in his loneliness be perpetually relives the social phase of his life. Though comfortable with his solitary life, Mike’s self-identity is clearly defined by his human relationships.")
- "The Rapids" (Accent, Winter 1941)
- "The Anonymous" (Virginia Quarterly Review, Summer 1941)
- "The Buck in the Hills"* (Rocky Mountain Review, Spring/Summer 1943)
- "Why Don't You Look Where You're Going?"* (Accent, Summer 1941)
- "The Indian Well" (Accent, Spring 1943)
- "The Fish Who Could Close His Eyes" (Tomorrow, February 1946)
- "The Portable Phonograph" (Yale Review, Spring 1941) (Note: Clark's short story "The Portable Phonograph" is also well-known. It’s a depiction of the last survivors in the world after the total destruction of a war. Clark gives hints of this destruction throughout the beginning of the story in a narrative voice that describes the scene in dark war-like terms. The characters are then introduced as a group of men huddled around a fire. One of them, a doctor, has a portable phonograph.)
- "The Watchful Gods"

== Background ==
- Of the written works contained in The Watchful Gods and Other Stories, all but one had been previously published in periodicals prior to the collection's publication: "Hook" first appeared in The Atlantic Monthly; "The Wind and the Snow of Winter" and "The Portable Photograph" were first published in The Yale Review; "The Rapids", "Why Don't You Look Where You're Going?", and "The Indian Well" had previously been published in Accent; "The Anonymous" had been published in The Virginia Quarterly Review; "The Buck in the Hills" was first published in The Rocky Mountain Review; and "The Fish Who Could Close His Eyes" initially saw publication in Tomorrow. The single novella in the volume, "The Watchful Gods", was the sole work published for the first time in the collection.
- Clark dedicated this book: for A.E. Hill.

== Reception ==
After they began appearing in national magazines during the 1940s, Clark's short stories gained national recognition, and earned five O. Henry Prize's between 1941 and 1945. These were:

1. "Hook" in 1941.
2. "The Portable Photograph" in 1942. Note that this story was published 3 years before the first atomic bomb was dropped. It’s often speculated that the plot of this story occurs after a nuclear war.
3. "The Return of Ariel Goodbody" in 1943. Note that this story was not republished in The Watchful Gods and it remains uncollected.
4. “The Buck in the Hills” in 1944.
5. "The Wind And The Snow Of Winter" in 1945, and was the O. Henry anthology "first prize winner" for that year.

Since this initial success, some of these stories, notably "Hook" and "The Wind And The Snow Of Winter," have consistently been anthologized as classic examples of the genre.

== See also ==
(Amazon | wp gwp g)
