= Gregor W. Yeates =

New Zealand zoologist and soil biologist (1944–2012)

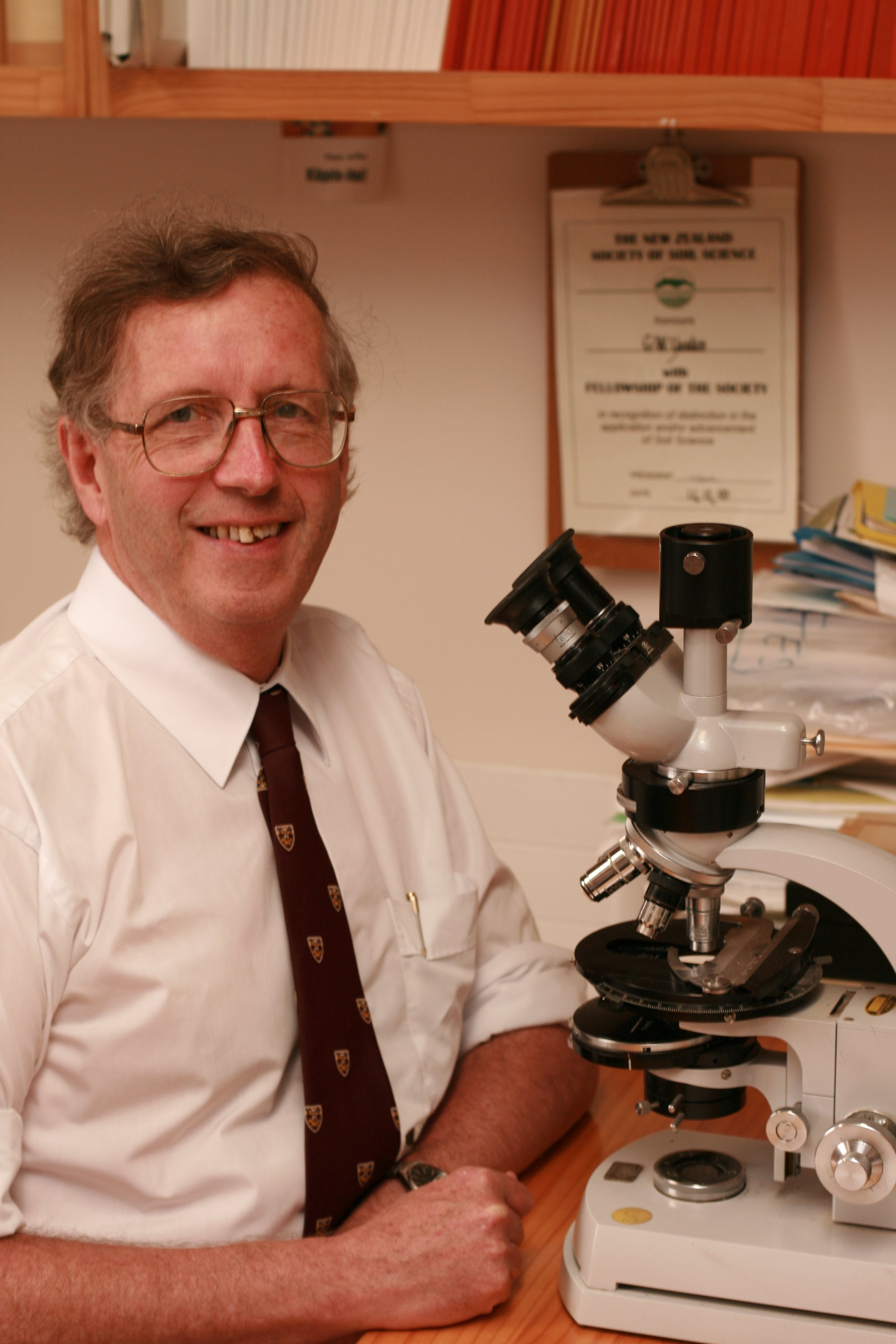
- Yeates in 2007
- Born: Gregor William Yeates; 19 May 1944; New Zealand
- Died: 6 August 2012 (aged 68); Palmerston North, New Zealand
- Education: University of Canterbury
- Scientific career
- Fields: Soil nematode ecology
- Workplaces: New Zealand Soil Bureau
- Thesis: Studies on nematodes of dune sands (1968)
- Doctoral advisor: Wally Clark

Gregor William Yeates, publishing as GW Yeates (19 May 1944 – 6 August 2012), was a New Zealand soil zoologist and ecologist. He was "considered the world's leading authority in soil nematode ecology, a subject of economic and ecological importance."

== Scientific career and contributions ==
As a student Yeates counted Adélie penguins at Cape Royds in 1964–65 and 1965–66. His PhD (under Wally Clark) was on nematodes of dune sands, and was completed in 1968 at the University of Canterbury. His DSc was also at the University of Canterbury. Yeates's early work on nematodes in sand dunes represented some of the first detailed work on nematodes in non-agricultural settings, and 'representing some of the most detailed assessments of nematode communities ever conducted in natural environments.'

Yeates spent most of his working life at Soil Bureau, a division of DSIR, which became Landcare Research. He published over 200 papers and described over 100 species in genera including Longidorus, Xiphinema, Hemicycliophora, Trischistoma and Dorylaimida. Holotypes of his are the earliest in the National Nematode Collection of New Zealand. He was awarded a Nuffield Foundation Commonwealth Travelling Fellowship to study at Rothamsted in 1977–1978. He conducted long-term work on CO_{2} enrichment in pasture. He studied the New Zealand flatworm Arthurdendyus triangulatus in its native environment, supporting work in the United Kingdom where it became established as an invasive pest.

== Family and civic life ==
Yeates was the son of Massey University founding staff member John Stuart Yeates. He and wife Judy lived in Upper Hutt and Palmerston North, with two children. He was elected to the Rimutaka ward of the Upper Hutt City Council (1973–1977) and the Hutt Valley Drainage Board (1973–1977). He was later involved with Te Manawa in Palmerston North and the Royal Society of New Zealand at both a local and a national level.

== Honours and offices ==
- Nuffield Travelling Scholarship (1977)
- Fellow of the Royal Society of New Zealand (1998)
- Fellow of the New Zealand Society of Soil Science (1995)
- Fellow of the Society of Nematologists (2007)
- Editorial Board of Journal of Nematology.
- Office holder in the Royal Society of New Zealand Manawatu Branch
- Officeholder in the Royal Society of New Zealand Wellington Branch from 1981, including 1987–88
- Upper Hutt City Councillor and Hutt Valley Drainage Board member from 1973 to 1977
- Council of the New Zealand Rhododendron Association 1997–2000
- Heritage Park Rhododendron Charitable Trust Trustee
- President of the New Zealand Society of Parasitology 1990–1991

== Publications ==
- Feeding Habits in Soil Nematode Families and Genera—An Outline for Soil Ecologists by G. W. Yeates, T. Bongers, R. G. M. De Goede, D. W. Freckman, and S. S. Georgieva in J Nematol. 1993 September; 25(3) has 901 citations according to google scholar. The paper is a study in the ecological role of nematodes structured by taxa.
- Gregor Yeates. Earthworms, Te Ara: The Encyclopedia of New Zealand, updated 27-Sep-11
- Plains' Science: Inventions, Innovations and Discoveries from the Manawatu v1. (2011), co-edited by Vince Neall and Gregor Yeates, Royal Society of New Zealand Manawatu Branch and the Science Centre Inc., ISBN 9780473187033.
