= The City of Trembling Leaves =

1945 semi-autobiographical novel by Walter Van Tilburg Clark

- First edition (publ. Random House)
- Author: Walter Van Tilburg Clark
- Genre: Semi-autobiographical novel
- Publisher: Random House
- Publication date: May 1, 1945

The City of Trembling Leaves (1945) is a semi-autobiographical novel by Walter Van Tilburg Clark. The novel is a series of parallel narratives detailing the lives and work of a group of redacted characters named Tim Hazard, Lawrence Black, Mary Turner, Rachel Wells, Marjory Hale, "Walt", (the narrator) and assorted other side-characters.

== Plot summary ==
The book opens over Reno, Nevada, the principal location for most of the stories. Clark describes the city as a scene, composed of several themes brought about by the physical structures of the city's districts. It is the early Twentieth Century. Reno is a bustling small town on the edge of a mountain range, with fantastic scenery all around. The vast majority of the book's elements are introduced by way of the primary character, Tim Hazard, and it is with him that the human narrative of the story begins. We find Tim in grade school and follow his adventures through childhood and adolescence until he becomes a man.

It is composed of so many stories and precious elements contained within, that even if the reader knows everything about the book, its whole storyline, from beginning to end, it is possible to observe countless elements not described in terms of the master narrative. Clark's fondness for the surroundings is not surprising—he grew up in Reno, son of a University of Nevada president. This familiarity with the underlying subject matter of the setting leads the book to evoke a sense of place not readily found in other works.

== Themes ==
The narrative touches on a variety of themes, seeming to center around the inevitability of tomorrow and the pursuit of human interests through spirituality, creativity, and friendship. It touches on ideas of inevitability of purpose and futility of wrongly-directed effort.
