= Charlton Laird =

American novelist

Charlton Grant Laird (1901–1984) was an American linguist, lexicographer, novelist, and essayist. Laird created the 1971 edition of the Webster's New World Thesaurus that became the standardized edition still used today. During his lifetime, he was probably best known for his language studies: books, textbooks, and reference works elucidating the English language for the layman along with his numerous contributions to dictionaries and thesauruses.

Laird wrote many other works of non-fiction and fiction, including two novels. He also published literary criticism, was a university instructor, and a leading expert and scholar on the life and work of Western novelist (and fellow Nevada writer) Walter Van Tilburg Clark. (see "Selected bibliography" below)

According to Webster's New World Thesaurus, it was Laird who created this "eminently successful work":

Professor Laird's thesaurus, first published in 1971 and revised in 1985 and 1997, has over the years proved itself to be the most usable and useful thesaurus available.

Laird was born in Nashua, Iowa and received his undergraduate education at the University of Iowa and went on to Columbia, Stanford, and Yale. He taught at Drake University and at the University of Nevada at Reno where he was professor of English from 1945–1968.

Charlton Laird was inducted into the Nevada Writers Hall of Fame in 1990.

== Selected bibliography ==
Novels

- Thunder on the River. Boston: Little, Brown, 1949.
- West of the River. Boston: Little, Brown, 1953.

Nonfiction

- The Miracle of Language. The World Publishing Company, 1953.
- A Basic Course in Modern English. Englewood Cliffs, NJ: Prentice-Hall, 1963. (Co-authors: Robert M. Gorrell and Raymond J. Pflug)
- Walter Van Tilburg Clark. Reno: Black Rock Press, 1972.
- Walter Van Tilburg Clark, Critiques. Reno, NV: Univ. of Nevada Press, 1983.
- Collins New World Thesaurus. London: Collins, 1979. new ed.
