= Market-Adjusted Performance Indicator =

Performance of company management through relative performance indicator

The Market-Adjusted Performance Indicator (MAPI) measures the performance of a company's management using a relative performance indicator designed to capture management performance as holistically as possible by covering both short-term success and long-term impact. The MAPI is an important element for targeted corporate governance. Bengt Holmström, with his economic research and his findings, for which he was awarded the Nobel Prize for Economics in 2016, laid the theoretical foundation for the application of a relative performance indicator. It states that top management should be incentivised with a long-term relative performance indicator for its variable compensation.

In the context of a research project of the University of Zurich under the direction of Ernst Fehr, the MAPI was developed and implemented with the consultancy firm Fehr Advice & Partners. To do this, a listed company's total shareholder return (TSR) is compared with the TSR of a customised, relevant peer group. This way external market shocks, for which the management should be neither rewarded nor penalised, can be excluded. The difference between the TSR of the company and that of its peer group provides insights into the actual performance of the CEO and top management. This makes management performance transparent.

Ernst Fehr and Adriano B. Lucatelli calculated the MAPI for all the firms in the Swiss Performance Index. The compensation model of the Liechtensteinische Landesbank is mainly based on the concept of the MAPI.
