= Walter Clarke =

Walter Clarke may refer to:

- Walter Clarke (linguist), Manx Gaelic speaker who undertook to record the surviving native Manx speakers
- Walter Clarke (governor) (1640–1714), Governor of the Colony of Rhode Island and Providence Plantations
- Walter Clarke (footballer) (1883–1939), Australian rules footballer
- Walter Clarke of Joe Thompson vs Walter Clarke

== See also ==
- Walter Clark (disambiguation)
