= Simons & Cameron =

- Origin: Reno, Nevada, U.S.
- Years active: 2002 – present
- Labels: Lane Gordon Music Company
- Members: Gordon Simons; Lane Cameron

The Simons & Cameron recording group, from Reno, Nevada, was formed in 2002 and is made up of the songwriting team of Gordon Simons and Lane Cameron, as well as singers and musicians from California and Nevada. The group has also established the Lane Gordon Music Company to publish and promote their music worldwide.

== Recording highlights ==
The musical group specializes in Christmas and Halloween music. Their songs are played on radio and television stations around the globe, including the Dr. Demento show and RW's Fireside Christmas Show. The recording group's Christmas CD, “Peace On Earth”, was spotlighted on news shows across the US. Rachel Eamigh, lead singer of the Simons & Cameron band, was interviewed by Jim Taylor of CBS in New York about their new Christmas CD.

The Simons & Cameron song "Monster Halloween Rap" was featured on America's number one soap opera, CBS's The Young and the Restless on October 29 and October 30, 2008.

== About the founders ==
Gordon Simons, an accomplished writer and producer, graduated Phi Beta Kappa from UCLA in 1990. Simons wrote and produced jingles and promos at KLA Radio in Los Angeles. The songwriter won the KLOS “Mark and Brian Show” comedy contest with the Lucky Butt song.

Lane Cameron attended the prestigious Berklee College of Music in the early 1970s and has performed across America. Cameron plays guitar, piano, bass, and blues harp. He has shared the stage with the Allman Brothers Band and Steven Stills.

Lane Cameron completed production and rhythm guitar work on three tracks of the new Craig Chaquico CD Follow The Sun. Chaquico is the former lead guitarist for Jefferson Starship, with 20 gold albums to his credit.

== Projects ==
Simons & Cameron is currently producing new music, jingles, and music videos in the Reno/Lake Tahoe area. The recording group is working with young, new singers, like Jerelle Manse, Erika Davidson and Brittanie Walten. Simons & Cameron has over 30 popular songs to their credit. They have just released a new Washington D.C. theme song: “America’s First Hometown”.
