= Walter Hugh Clark =

American politician

Member of the South Carolina House of Representatives
- In office 1961–???

Personal details
- Born: December 4, 1929
- Died: April 27, 2017 (aged 87)

Walter Hugh Clark (December 4, 1929 – April 27, 2017) was an American politician. He served as a member of the South Carolina House of Representatives.

== Life and career ==
Clark attended Johnston High School.

In 1961, Clark was elected to the South Carolina House of Representatives, representing Edgefield County, South Carolina.

Clark died in April 2017, at the age of 87.
