= Walter Ernest Clark =

American academic (1873–1955)

Walter Ernest Clark (June 9, 1873 – May 1, 1955) was president of the University of Nevada, 1918–1938.

Clark was born in Defiance, Ohio to Lemen Talor and Marth (Robinson) Clark, and graduated from Ohio Wesleyan University in 1896. From 1893 to 1897 he was a sergeant in the signal corps of Company K, Fourth Ohio National Guard. And from 1896 to 1899 Clark was instructor in mathematics at Ohio Wesleyan. In 1903 Clark was awarded a Doctor of Philosophy degree from Columbia University. From 1901 to 1907 he was instructor in economics and politics at the College of the City of New York. Between 1903 and 1908 he was a resident and settlement worker of Greenwich House, a settlement house with the mission to improve the living conditions among the predominantly immigrant population in Greenwich Village. He became professor and head of the department of political science City College from 1907 to 1918.

In 1908 he married Euphemia Murray Abrams, of Hartford, Connecticut and together they had a son, Walter Van Tilburg Clark on August 3, 1909, in East Orland, Maine.

In 1918 Clark accepted the position of president at the University of Nevada, and moved his family to Reno, Nevada. During his time as president, the university expanded, surpassing 500 students for the first time in 1921, and 1,000 students in 1936. The School of Education was organized, as well as an Engineering Experimental Station. The Memorial Library was completed in 1927, with an approximate cost of $250,000 donated by William A. Clark in memory of his wife. Another gift of $415,000 from Clarence Mackay led to the construction of Mackay Science Hall in 1930, which housed the Departments of Chemistry, Physics, and Mathematics. Additionally donations of land by Clarence Mackay increased campus acreage by nearly fifty percent.

The administration of President Clark ended on September 30, 1938, when Dr. Leon W. Hartman became acting president.

== Works ==
- Clark, Walter E. 1903. Josiah Tucker, economist: a study in the history of economics. New York: Columbia University Press.
- Clark, Walter E. 1915. The cost of living. Chicago : A. C. McClurg & Co.
