= Sunset Tan =

- Genre: Reality
- Country of origin: United States
- Original language: English
- No. of seasons: 2
- No. of episodes: 19

Production
- Executive producers: Mechelle Collins; Kevin Dill; Jay James
- Running time: 30 minutes
- Production companies: E! Studios; Intuitive Entertainment

Original release
- Network: E!
- Release: May 28, 2007 – September 29, 2008

Sunset Tan is an American reality television series on E!, which debuted on May 28, 2007. The series chronicles the lives of the managers and employees of a tanning salon in Los Angeles called Sunset Tan. On April 3, 2008, E! renewed the series for a second and final season.

== Synopsis ==
An ongoing theme throughout the show is competition between employees, specifically the battle to be selected by Devin and Jeff as the manager of the new Las Vegas salon, located at Palms Casino Resort. Janelle is ultimately selected for the position. By the end of the first season, Holly and Molly (The Olly Girls) are allegedly fired after throwing a party at Jeff's house while he was out of town. However, at the beginning of the second season after the girls have a meeting with Devin and Jeff, the two decide to rehire them.

== Cast ==
- Devin Haman, one of the founders and owners of the Sunset Tan salon
- Jeff Bozz, one of the founders and owners of the Sunset Tan salon
- "The Olly Girls", aka company promoters Holly Huddleston and Molly Shea
- Erin Tietsort, manager of the Santa Monica store, originally from Oklahoma
- Nick D'Anna, the manager of the West Hollywood store
- Janelle Perry, manager of the Santa Monica store, and eventually the Las Vegas location
- Keely Williams, West L.A. manager
- Adam Ouf, top sales associate
- Ania Migdal, Nick's girlfriend and sales associate
- Heidi Cortez, the new girl joining Sunset Tan who previously opened her own salon in Reno. Heidi is a successful model, author & radio host. Controversy arose as her fellow cast members question whether or not she is qualified for the job. She quits Sunset Tan in the beginning of Season 2.

=== Celebrity guests ===
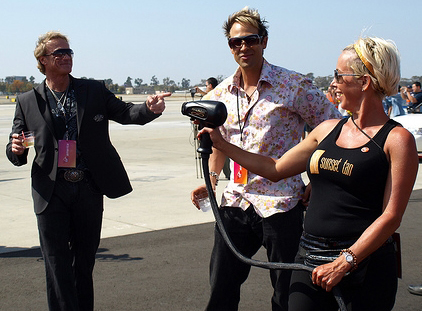
Devin Haman and Jeff Bozz in April 2009

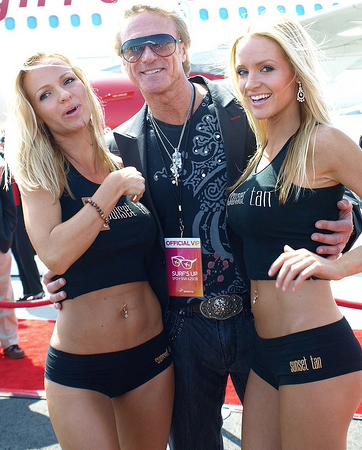
Kenndra Warren, Devin Haman, and Marsha Warren in April 2009

- Traci Bingham
- Jessica Canseco, ex-wife of José Canseco
- Chelsea Handler
- Jenna Jameson
- Kato Kaelin
- Maria Kanellis, WWE Diva
- Chris Kattan
- Kim Kardashian
- Mario Lopez
- Candice Michelle, Former WWE Diva
- Tito Ortiz, mixed martial artist and boyfriend of Jenna Jameson
- Daniel Puder
- Shauna Sand-Lamas, Playboy Playmate and ex-wife of Lorenzo Lamas
- Pauly Shore
- Karina Smirnoff
- Britney Spears
- Eve Torres WWE Diva
- Maryse Ouellet, WWE Diva

== Episodes ==
=== Series overview ===
Season	Episodes	Originally released	
Season	Episodes	First released	Last released
1	12	May 28, 2007	September 30, 2007
2	7	August 3, 2008	September 14, 2008

=== Season 1 (2007) ===
No.	Title	Original release date
1	"Welcome to Sunset Tan"	May 28, 2007
2	"Vegas, Baby"	June 3, 2007
3	"Oklahoma!"	June 10, 2007
4	"Miss Sunset Tan"	June 17, 2007
5	"Olly's Follies"	June 24, 2007
6	"The Reveal"	July 1, 2007
7	"New Kid on the Block"	August 19, 2007
8	"All Work, No Play"	August 26, 2007
9	"Guess Who's Coming to Sunset Tan?"	September 2, 2007
10	"Relationship Woes"	September 9, 2007
11	"Ollies vs. Oakies"	September 23, 2007
12	"Employees Gone Wild!"	September 30, 2007

=== Season 2 (2008) ===
No.	Title	Original release date
13	"Summer Lovin'"	August 3, 2008
14	"Meet the Parent"	August 10, 2008
15	"World Tanning Convention"	August 17, 2008
16	"Horse Play"	August 31, 2008
17	"He Said/She Said"	September 1, 2008
18	"The Big Grand Opening"	September 7, 2008
19	"30 Is the New 20"	September 14, 2008

== Home releases ==
The complete first season of Sunset Tan on DVD was released by Lionsgate on Region 1 DVD on August 5, 2008. Both seasons have been released uncensored by Shock Records in Australia. The show was also available to download on iTunes and Amazon on October 30, 2007.

Season	Release dates		Discs
Season	Region 1	Region 4	Discs
1	August 5, 2008	December 6, 2008	2
2		September 25, 2009	2
