= Walter H. Clark =

Walter Houston Clark (1902 – December 15, 1994) was a professor of psychology of religion at Andover Newton Theological School. He explored religion, mystical experience and use of psychedelics.

Clark was born in Westfield, N.J. He graduated from Williams College in 1928 and received a doctorate in psychology and education from Harvard University in 1944.

In 1962 he joined Harvard Psychedelic Drug Project. Later he worked at the Worcester Foundation for Experimental Biology and at the Maryland Psychiatric Research Center at Spring Grove State Hospital investigating the effects of psychedelic drugs.

Clark was a co-founder and president of the Society for the Scientific Study of Religion. He received the APA William James Memorial Award for contributions to the psychology of religion.

== Books ==
- The Oxford Group: Its History and Significance (1951)
- The Psychology of Religion (1958)
- Chemical Ecstasy (1969)
- Religious Experience: Its Nature and Function in the Human Psyche (1973)
