= Walter Clarke (footballer) =

Australian rules footballer

Personal information
- Full name: Walter Verdun Clarke
- Born: 3 February 1883; Williamstown, Victoria
- Died: 23 April 1939 (aged 56); Williamstown North, Victoria
- Original team: Northcote Juniors

Playing career^{1}
Years	Club	Games (Goals)
1902	St Kilda	1 (0)
- ^{1} Playing statistics correct to the end of 1902.

Walter Verdun Clarke (3 February 1883 – 23 April 1939) was an Australian rules footballer who played with St Kilda in the Victorian Football League (VFL).
