= Linguistics in the United States =

The history of linguistics in the United States began to discover a greater understanding of humans and language. By trying to find a greater ‘parent language’ through similarities in different languages, a number of connections were discovered. Many contributors and new ideas helped shape the study of linguistics in the United States into what we know it as today. In the 1920s, linguistics focused on grammatical analysis and grammatical structure, especially of languages indigenous to North America, such as Chippewa, Apache, and more. In addition to scholars who have paved the way for linguistics in the United States, the Linguistic Society of America is a group that has contributed to the research of linguistics in America. The United States has long been known for its diverse collection of linguistic features and dialects that are spread across the country. In recent years, the study of linguistics in the United States has broadened to include nonstandard varieties of English speaking, such as Chicano English and African American English, as well as the question if language perpetuates inequalities.

== Important Linguists in the United States ==
William Dwight Whitney, the first U.S.-taught academic linguist, founded the American Philological Association in 1869. During Whitney's professional career he served as president of the Convention of American Philologists. He was also the first editor-in-chief of The Century Dictionary, 1889–1891. He has also written many books including 'A Sanskrit Grammar' (1879), 'A Compendious German Grammar' (1869), 'A German Reader' (1869), 'The Life and Growth of Language' (1875), and more can be found listed in The Encyclopedia Americana.

Leonard Bloomfield (1878–1949), professor at the University of Chicago from 1927-1940, founded the Linguistic Society of America in 1924 as presented in the A History of the American Philological Association. Other linguists active in the first half of the 20th century include Edward Sapir and Benjamin Whorf.

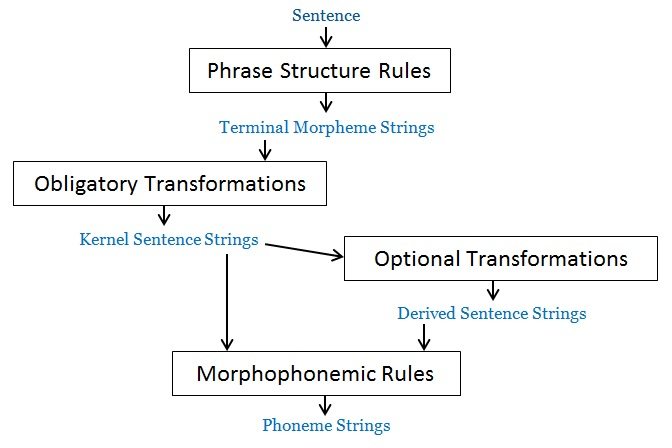
The grammar model from Syntactic Structures (1957) by Noam Chomsky, an American linguist

Noam Chomsky is an American linguist who is often described as the "father of modern linguistics". He theorized on language from a biological standpoint, and referred to it as a cognitive ""module"" in the human brain. Chomsky outlined key differences between language cognition in humans and in other animals as head author of "The Language Faculty", published in 2002. He also contributed the theory of Universal Grammar. From the 1950s, American linguistic tradition began to diverge from the de Saussurian structuralism taught in European academia, notably with Noam Chomsky's "nativist" transformational grammar and successor theories, which during the 1970s "linguistics wars" gave rise to a wide variety of competing grammar frameworks.

American linguistics outside the Chomskyan tradition includes functional grammar with proponents including Talmy Givón, and cognitive grammar advocated by Ronald Langacker and others. John McWhorter, who has a background in teaching African-American studies, is another American linguist.

Linguistic typology, and controversially mass lexical comparison, was considered by Joseph Greenberg. Winfred P. Lehmann introduced Greenbergian typological theory to Indo-European studies in the 1970s.

== Indigenous Languages and Linguistics ==
In early studies of linguistics in the 1920s, it was incredibly common for an American linguist to focus on grammar and structure of languages native to North America, such as Chippewa, Ojibwa, Apache, Mohawk, and many other indigenous languages. Due to the origins of the study, there is extensive information on the dialects and structure of indigenous languages.

== Linguistic Society of America ==
The Linguistic Society of America has over 4000 members across the globe. It is made up of students, teachers, and individuals with a passion for linguistics and its field of study. Most of the Linguistic Society of America's members are either working towards a degree in the field or have already earned one. Members of LSA who have earned their PhD work at colleges or universities where they can improve their research, hold research studies, and teach courses. An increasing number of LSA members are working in government fields and are using their expansive knowledge of linguistics to create products and technologies to be used by the general public. The Linguistic Society of America also has sister organizations that they work closely with such as the American Dialect Society and the Society for the Study of the Indigenous Languages of the Americas.

== Inequalities in Linguistics ==
Inequalities in language are due to different languages and dialects being seen as having less value than others, this can also be viewed as Linguistic discrimination. For example, the Oakland School District implemented Ebonics, also referred to as African American Vernacular English, as the 'primary' language of African American students in 1996. Ebonics is not a language, but a dialect commonly used by black Americans. This implementation of Ebonics as a new language sought to teach students a 'standard' variety of English and showed the outlook of the lesser value assigned to the variation in language.

=== See also ===
- Indigenous languages of the Americas, for the study of American languages
- American Association for Applied Linguistics
