= Myram Borders =

American journalist (born 1936)

- Born: May 21, 1936; Kentucky
- Occupation: News reporter
- Writing career
- Genre: Journalism
- Literary movement: Mob era

Myram Borders (born in Kentucky in 1936) is an American journalist, a former United Press International reporter, and was the wire service's Las Vegas bureau manager from 1965 to 1990. Upon retirement, she was appointed Nevada commissioner of consumer affairs and, after two years, in 1992 was named chief of the Las Vegas News Bureau, a post she held for a decade.

== Early life and education ==
Borders moved with her family from Kentucky to Nevada in 1940 when she was 4 years old. She attended the historic Fifth Street School, and graduated in 1954 from Las Vegas High School (now a performing arts academy) in downtown Las Vegas, where she reported for the school newspaper.

In March 1957 during her senior year, she was elected to the top women's position at UNR as president of Associated Women Students while a member of Pi Beta Phi.

On a Harold's Club scholarship, she graduated from the University of Nevada, Reno's school of journalism with a bachelor of arts degree.

== Career ==
Also during her senior year at UNR, she interned at United Press International in Reno and, upon graduation, went to work for UPI full-time, later transferring to the San Diego bureau, then Los Angeles and, ultimately, to Las Vegas as the bureau manager, from the time it was mob influenced into the large corporate era of the 1990s. Borders was the first female wire service manager in the western United States. In 1986, UPI appointed Borders as news manager for Nevada, Idaho and Montana.

After leaving UPI, she opened the first full-time Las Vegas office for Gannet Newspapers before accepting her appointment as Nevada commissioner of Consumer Affairs. After that short stint, Borders headed the Las Vegas News Bureau before retiring in 2002.

While with UPI, Borders covered the Beatles' arrival in Las Vegas in 1964 when they performed at the Las Vegas Convention Center. She also broke the news story of Elvis Presley's 1967 wedding to girlfriend Priscilla Beaulieu at the Aladdin hotel-casino wedding chapel after getting a tip. She went to the Aladdin Hotel Casino and waited all night. At 8 o'clock in the morning, Borders noticed a Nevada Supreme Court justice walking into the casino and asked if he was there to marry Elvis, and he confirmed it. She was first reporter to file the story about the wedding.

In 1969, she wrote a review of Presley's opening night at the International Hotel in Las Vegas for UPI. In the article titled "Elvis Swings Into Action in Vegas," she wrote, "During the performance, Presley went through 15 selections including some of his top records, 'Blue Suede Shoes,' 'Love Me Tender,' 'Jailhouse Rock,' and 'Heartbreak Hotel.' He also strummed his guitar and slithered through his recent recording, 'In The Ghetto'."

In 1981, Borders was the first reporter on the scene of the car bombing on Sahara Blvd. involving mob connected bookmaker and casino operator Frank "Lefty" Rosenthal. During her career with UPI, Borders also covered the Watts riots in Los Angeles, the assassination of Robert F. Kennedy, the indictment of Sirhan Sirhan, and the Charles Manson murder trial.

In 2015, Borders was featured as a "Nevada Maker" as part of its KLVX Documentaries series.

In 2019, upon receiving the Nevada Press Association award in Carson City, Nevada, she told the audience, "Nevada was and is an ideal place to be a news reporter ... You won't get bored."

== Awards ==
In September 2019, Borders was inducted into the Nevada Press Association's Hall of Fame.

== Affiliations ==
She served three terms as president of the Las Vegas chapter of the Society of Professional Journalists and was instrumental in helping get Nevada's open meeting law on the books, which passed at the 11th hour by the Nevada Legislature and was signed into law in 1977 by then-Gov. Mike O'Callaghan.
