= Adriano B. Lucatelli =

Swiss entrepreneur (born 1966)

Adriano B. Lucatelli (born 1966) is a Swiss entrepreneur and investor in the financial services industry.

== Life ==
Adriano Lucatelli was born on 23 February 1966 in Uster near Zurich and is a dual citizen of Switzerland and Italy. His father’s side of the family originated from Apulia in southern Italy and was primarily active in agriculture and the textile industry. His mother’s side of the family originated in Central Switzerland. His great-grandfather was the entrepreneur and pioneer in electricity Zeno Durrer, and his great uncle was Ludwig von Moos, a member of the Swiss federal government (the Swiss Federal Council) and President of the Swiss Confederation (1964 and 1969).

== Education and training ==
Adriano Lucatelli attended high school in Zurich, where he graduated at the top of his class. Prior to his studies, he trained as a foreign exchange dealer at Union Bank of Switzerland in Zurich and Berne.

Lucatelli studied international affairs and economics at the University of Nevada, Reno (BA) and at the London School of Economics (MSc). Before completing his doctorate at the University of Zurich, he did a six-month stint at the General Secretariat of Amnesty International.

While working, Lucatelli completed an MBA program at the University of Rochester (N.Y.), an advanced management program at the Wharton School and an executive program at the Singularity University in Silicon Valley.

== Career ==
Lucatelli started his career in 1994 at former Credit Suisse, where he held various managerial positions in Zurich and London. From 2002 to 2009, he was managing director and member of the management committee at UBS Switzerland in Lugano and Zurich.

Since 2009, Lucatelli has been an entrepreneur and investor in financial services and is considered a Swiss fintech pioneer. Lucatelli was the first external investor in the software company Additiv AG, where he also served as chairman until the sale of his stake for an undisclosed sum.

In 2015, Lucatelli launched Descartes Finance AG, now a FINMA-approved WealthTech firm, which mainly offers banking as a service (BaaS). Its clients include the largest Swiss Neobanks Yuh AG (product of Swissquote) and Neon, Glarner Regionalbank and Investas AG.

From 2012 to 2018, he lectured part-time at the University of Zurich.

== Publications ==
He is the author the book Finance and World Order (1997), which has been widely cited, including by sociologist Ulrich Beck in his standard work World at Risk (2008). He is also the author of investor guides such as Off-Target Corporate Governance (2013), and The Fine Art of Efficient Investing (2015). In 2018, he co-authored with Lucienne C. Vaudan “Eine kurze Reise durch die Finanzmärkte.”

== Investment expertise ==
Lucatelli's main research interest lies in determining the main factors influencing the increase in company value. In this context, Lucatelli, together with Ernst Fehr, calculated the Market-Adjusted Performance Indicator (MAPI) for listed Swiss companies for the first time and showed that good corporate governance systematically generates shareholder value, as evidenced by the fact that the shares of these companies have in some cases achieved significantly better results than the market average as measured by the broad-based Swiss Performance Index (SPI).

== Awards and recognition ==
- Distinguished Alumni Award from the College of Liberal Arts, University of Nevada (2011)
- Nominated by EY Switzerland for the Entrepreneur of the Year Award (2011)
- Bilanz: Top 100 Bankers in Switzerland (2017–2021)
- DigitalSwitzerland: Digital Shaper in the “Fintechies” category (2026)

== Personal life ==
Lucatelli is an honorary member of Pi Sigma Alpha (American Political Science Association) and a member of the Athenaeum Club in London. Lucatelli is interested in aviation and holds a pilot's licence for helicopters (Jet Ranger and Bell 407). His favourite movies are Forrest Gump (1994) and The Big Short (2015). In sports, he supports the Grasshopper Club Zurich and AC Milan.

== Quotes ==
"If finance can't improve the lives of people, we have no use for it."

"Visions also have to be solidly financed."

"What is wrong economically can't be right politically."
