= Mike Legarza =

American basketball coach and former player

Playing career
- 1978-1980: Menlo College
- 1980-1982: Nevada

Mike Legarza is an American Leadership Coach, public speaker, basketball coach, and former player. Legarza is the Founder of Legarza Basketball Camps, the largest day basketball camp in the country, with over 250,000 players having attended. Legarza was a small college All American basketball player at Menlo College where he led the nation in free throw percentage shooting over 91%. Legarza played college basketball for the Nevada Wolfpack from 1980 to 1982.

Legarza also wrote a coaching curriculum for the Positive Coaching Alliance at Stanford University. These coaching techniques have been taught in all 50 states to over eight million youth athletes. A former college basketball coach, at Canada College in Redwood City, CA. His teams won 249 games while losing only 59. He was named the California Community College State Coach of the Year. In March 2012, Coach Legarza was inducted into the California Community College Coaches Hall of Fame. Legarza and his wife Kim have raised three children; Vince Legarza a professional basketball coach in the NBA, Alex a rising star in the Silicon Valley Tech Industry and Isabella a collegiate volleyball player at Michigan State University.

== Early life, education and athletic career ==
The son of a coach, John Legarza and schoolteacher, Nadine. Legarza was an All-State and All-American football player and All-State basketball player at Reno High School in Reno, Nevada, graduating in 1978. He then attended Menlo College, a 2-year college in California, where he played basketball for Bud Presley, and was an All-American guard who led the nation in free throw percentage, shooting 91%. He then transferred to the Nevada, where he was a part-time starter and earned a BS in Physical Education 1983. Legarza earned a master's degree in Educational Leadership from the University of San Diego in 1986, and spent a year at Stanford University 1990, where he worked with Positive Coaching Alliance developing a youth sports coaching model.

== Coaching career ==
=== Assistant coach ===
Legarza entered into the coaching profession as a graduate assistant coach at the University of Nevada 1983. In 1984- 85 he served as an unpaid volunteer assistant for Boyd Grant at Fresno State, where the Bulldogs made it the NCAA Tournament. In 1985 Legarza became the assistant coach for Hank Egan at the University of San Diego, where he was the recruiting coordinator. While at San Diego, the Torrero's won the league and made it to the NCAA Tournament in 1987.

=== Head coach ===
After his success at San Diego, Legarza became the Head Coach at Canada College, California Community College in Redwood City California in 1989. Legarza built a program that had only won a combined 3 games in the 3 years prior to his arrival into a state power. Over his 11 years at Canada Legarza’s teams won 259 games while losing only 59, an 81% winning percentage. His teams won multiple league championships, made it to postseason playoffs 10 straight years, was named Conference coach of the year, State Coach of the Year in 2000. While at Canada Legarza developed 11 All American players and 59 of 60 players who played for him graduated and transferred to 4-year colleges. In March 2012 Coach Mike Legarza was inducted into the California Community College Coaches Hall of Fame.
