= The Ox-Bow Incident (novel) =

1940 western novel by Walter Van Tilburg Clark

- First edition
- Author: Walter Van Tilburg Clark
- Genre: Western
- Publisher: Random House
- Publication date: 1940
- Pages: 309
- OCLC: 5721011

The Ox-Bow Incident is a 1940 western novel by Walter Van Tilburg Clark in which two cattlemen are drawn into a lynch mob that hangs three men presumed to be rustlers and the killers of a man. It was Clark's first published novel.

In 1943, the novel was adapted into an Academy Award–nominated movie of the same name, directed by William A. Wellman and starring Henry Fonda and Harry Morgan.

== Synopsis ==
The Ox-Bow Incident takes place in 1885, and it begins with two cowboys, Art Croft and Gil Carter, riding into the town of Bridger's Wells. They go into Canby's Saloon and find the atmosphere is tense, partly due to recent incidents of cattle rustling. News is brought that a local named Kinkaid has been murdered and a large number of cattle have been stolen from Drew, the largest cattle rancher in Bridger's Wells. The townspeople begin to form a posse. Judge Tyler arrives and tries to defuse the situation. Then rancher Tetley incites the posse into action. As the posse sets out, the judge warns that the posse must bring suspects back alive to stand trial.

The posse finds cattle bearing Drew's brand and three men sleeping on the ground around a campfire: an old, raving man named Alva Hardwick; a Mexican named Juan Martinez, who claims to be unable to understand English; and the young Donald Martin. Tetley interrogates them. Martin says that he purchased the cattle and that Drew was to send the bill of sale at a later date. No one believes him, and the mob decides the men should be hanged.

The execution is postponed until dawn. Martin, as his last wish, writes a private letter to his wife, asking Davies to deliver it. Hoping to save Martin's life, Davies tries to have everyone read the letter. When Martin learns of this, he becomes angry at Davies for the breach of his privacy. Taking advantage of the distraction caused by the argument, Martinez tries to escape and is shot in the leg. The riders then discover that Juan is able to speak "American" and has a pistol engraved with Kinkaid's name.

A vote is taken on whether the men should be hanged or taken back to face justice in the town. Of the group, only five are opposed to the hanging, with Tetley's son Gerald among them. When sunrise approaches, the condemned men are placed upon their horses with nooses around their necks. Tetley orders three people including his son to tend to the horses. When the command is given, Gerald balks and the horse simply walks out from under Martin, leaving him to slowly strangle until he is shot. In anger, Tetley pistol whips his son to the ground.

After the lynching, the posse head back toward town, where they meet Sheriff Risley, Judge Tyler, Drew, and – much to their surprise – the supposedly murdered Lawrence Kinkaid. Drew confirms that he had sold the cattle to Martin, who was not a rustler. The infuriated judge declares he will charge the entire posse for murder. However, after staring down each member of the lynch mob one at a time, Sheriff Risley declares that he will pretend he saw nobody and knows nothing. He forms a posse, and they go out in search of the real rustlers.

Back in town, Tetley returns to his house and locks out his son. Gerald, horrified by his participation in the lynchings, goes into the barn and hangs himself. When Tetley hears of his son's death, he takes his own life as well by falling on his old cavalry sword. Later, Davies confesses to Art that he feels he is responsible for the deaths of three innocent men. The novel ends with Gil saying "I'll be glad to get out of here." Art says "Yeh."

== Reviews ==
Clifton Fadiman wrote an introduction to the Readers Club edition in which he called it a "mature, unpitying examination of what causes men to love violence and to transgress justice," and "the best novel of its year".

== Adaptations ==
The novel was adapted in 1943 into a movie of the same name, directed by William A. Wellman and starring Henry Fonda and Harry Morgan.

The book was adapted in 1976 into a theatrical stage version by actor Jim Beaver.

An abridged version of the book was released as a recording by Caedmon Records in 1979, narrated by Henry Fonda. It was nominated for a Grammy Award for Best Spoken Word, Documentary or Drama Recording.

Classics Illustrated featured the book as its 125th issue.
