= Las Vegas News Bureau =

Promotional agency within the Convention and Visitors Authority

- Established: 1949
- Purpose: Tourism promotion
- Headquarters: Las Vegas Valley, Nevada
- Parent organization: Las Vegas Convention and Visitors Authority (LVCVA)
- Formerly called: Desert Sea News Bureau (1949–1955)

The Las Vegas News Bureau is a promotional agency within the Las Vegas Convention and Visitors Authority (LVCVA). It is based in the Las Vegas Valley. It was created as the Desert Sea News Bureau in 1949, originally as a promotional branch of the local chamber of commerce. It consisted of a team of photographers and writers, who would chronicle local attractions for publication in national newspapers and magazines.

The current name was adopted in 1955, and the LVCVA has operated the bureau since 1992. The bureau's collection, including historic film footage and more than 7 million photographs, is stored in a vault at the Las Vegas Convention Center.

== History ==
=== Early years ===
Throughout the later half of the 1940s, the Las Vegas chamber of commerce hired various advertising firms to promote the city to tourists. The most successful of these firms was Steve Hannagan and Associates, hired in 1948. Hannagan had previously led promotional campaigns for Sun Valley, Idaho and Miami Beach, Florida. In 1949, the chamber of commerce created a promotional branch known as the Desert Sea News Bureau. The name was a reference to nearby Lake Mead. Hannagan led the agency with a small team of photographers and writers.

The bureau would place stories in major newspapers and magazines to promote Las Vegas, and also sent photos and stories to travel editors. For example, bureau photographers would typically snap images of tourists enjoying themselves at Las Vegas resorts, and then send the photos to the visitors' local newspaper for publication. Because Las Vegas was already known for its gambling, Hannagan primarily focused on other amenities that the city had to offer. The bureau also promoted nearby nature attractions such as Death Valley, Lake Mead, and Zion National Park. Although the bureau sought to convey a family image of Las Vegas, it also relied on an excess of cheesecake photos featuring young women. Visiting celebrities were also featured regularly. Singer Frank Sinatra and the Rat Pack were frequent subjects of photographs and video footage shot by the bureau. Sinatra would later perform for one of the agency's promotional films.

Hannagan departed the bureau later in 1949, as the chamber of commerce could not afford to keep him on. However, his advertising methods would continue to be used. Ken Frogley took over management, and the bureau continued its focus on non-gaming attractions. Frogley would regularly travel to Los Angeles, hoping to convince local writers to publish more positive stories of Las Vegas. The bureau also provided assistance to visiting reporters, giving them tours of the city while persuading resorts to offer them free rooms and meals.

In 1953, the Sands hotel-casino installed a floating craps table in its pool. A bureau photo of gamblers, playing the game in swimming suits, was published around the world through United Press International. The popular photo was taken by chief photographer Don English, and it helped to propel Las Vegas' tourism industry. Frank Wright, curator for the Nevada State Museum in Las Vegas, said, "It's one of those icon photographs; something catchy that captured American imaginations". Another popular photo, also by English, involved Sands showgirl Lee Merlin dressed in cotton which resembled a miniature mushroom cloud. The 1957 photo, known as Miss Atomic Blast, reflected the atomic testing that was common in Nevada at the time.

The agency was renamed the Las Vegas News Bureau in May 1955, emphasizing its association with the city. That year, the Las Vegas Sun wrote that the chamber of commerce, through the bureau, deserved "a major share of the credit for Las Vegas's status as a tourist capital of the world". During the 1950s, the bureau worked with film studios and Las Vegas hotels to put together premiere events for several films. It also created a 13-minute promotional film in 1956, titled Las Vegas: Playground USA. It was produced on a $10,000 budget.

By the late 1950s, the bureau had sent nearly 30,000 photographs to national newspapers and magazines, which had published around 15,000 stories and images. Don Payne took over management in the 1960s. By the end of the decade, Las Vegas had become well known among the general public, and the bureau gradually shifted to become a liaison, working with hotel publicists and travel writers.

=== Recent years ===
Closure of the Las Vegas News Bureau was announced in May 1992, after funding was pulled. The agency had been spending $650,000 a year. The chamber of commerce determined that the bureau was duplicating promotional efforts already undertaken by individual resorts. The LVCVA took over the bureau later that year and kept it open, albeit with a reduced budget. Journalist Myram Borders was announced as the new head of the agency, taking over for Payne. Borders retired from the position in 2002.

As of 2004, the Las Vegas News Bureau had more than 1 million negatives stored in its vault. That year, the agency exhibited 70 images from its collection, depicting noteworthy moments from the city's history. In 2007, the bureau sought to exhibit more of its collection for educational purposes. The agency hoped to digitally archive much of the collection within five years, allowing for preservation and display of the items. Borders praised these efforts and said that prior to that point, there was little public demand to see the collection. She also noted that the bureau previously did not have enough staff and time to exhibit the items.

Two exhibits opened later in 2007, and others would follow in the years to come. As of 2021, the Las Vegas News Bureau has more than 7 million photos in its collection, which is stored in a temperature-controlled vault at the Las Vegas Convention Center.
