= Heidi Cortez =

American entrepreneur

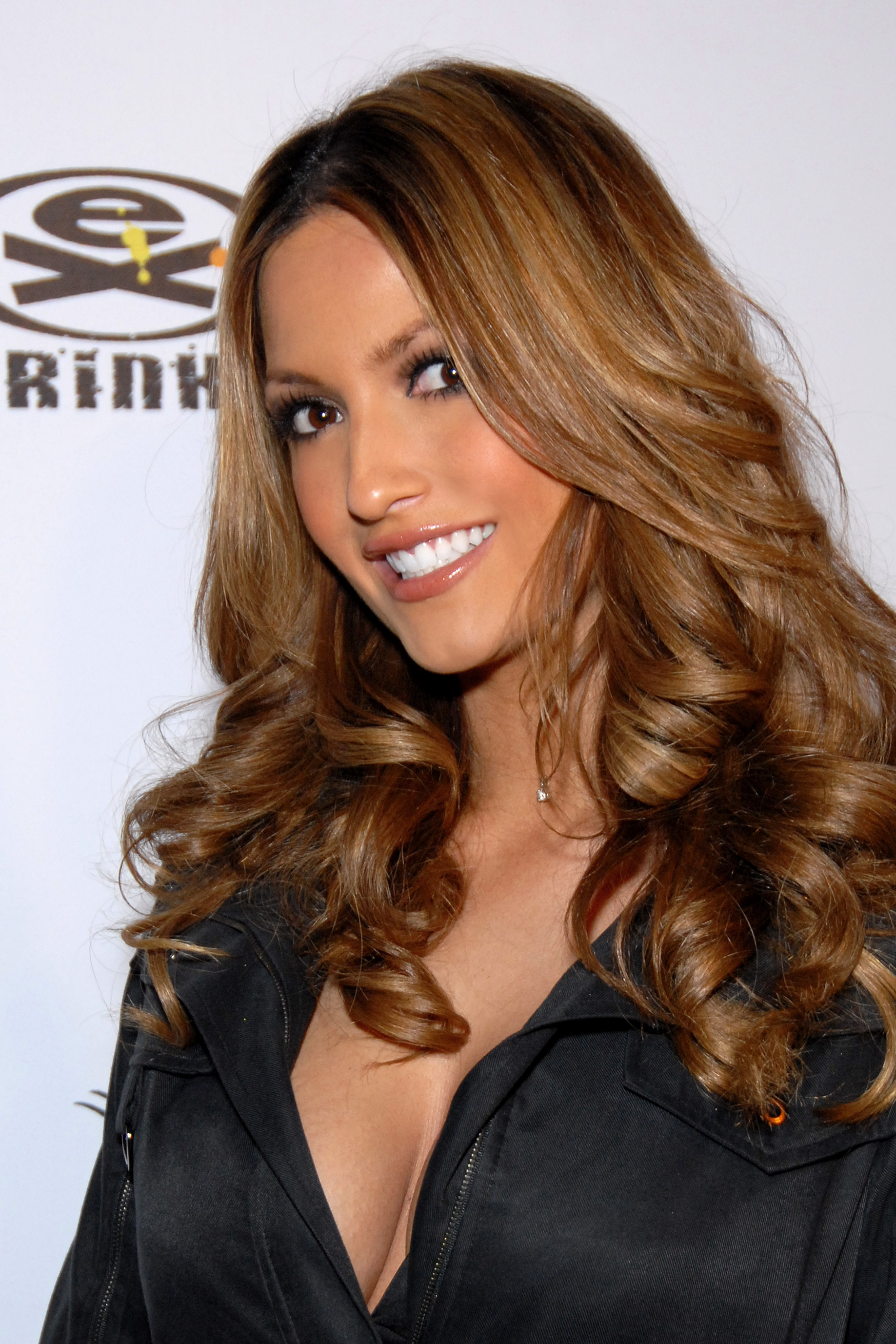
- Heidi Cortez attending the Sunset Tan Holiday Party at Area, Hollywood, CA in 2007
- Born: March 11, 1981 (age 45); San Bernardino, California
- Website: https://www.heidicortez.com

Heidi Cortez (born March 11, 1981) is an American entrepreneur, coach, speaker, writer, and advisor. In November 2005, Cortez was hired by Howard Stern to be the radio host and co-writer on a segment on his SiriusXM satellite channel. On the show, Cortez would read bedtime stories to the listeners at the end of the day. As of August 2006, the segment was canceled.

She released her first book Heidi's Bedtime Stories on November 7, 2006, through Simon & Schuster. The book immediately made the Barnes & Noble's Best Sellers List. In June 2007, the book was published again in paperback.

Her acting and modeling career took off internationally in print, including Maxim Magazine, and several TV commercials, and music videos. In 2007–2008, Cortez was cast and appeared on the American reality television show Sunset Tan on the E! Network for two seasons.

She wrote her second book titled, For Somebody Who Knows Nobody: How to Start Your Modeling Career in 2014 after helping many aspiring models launch their careers.

In 2022 Cortez wrote her 4th book, Get Verified And Profit Like A Boss.
