= Wally Clark (zoologist) =

New Zealand zoologist (1927–2019)

- Born: Walter Clive Clark; 22 October 1927; Christchurch, New Zealand
- Died: 21 November 2019 (aged 92); Christchurch, New Zealand
- Education: Imperial College, London
- Scientific career
- Fields: Zoology
- Workplaces: Department of Scientific and Industrial Research; Massey University; University of Canterbury
- Thesis: Systematic and morphological studies on some Enoplida Nematoda, with special reference to the soil fauna of New Zealand (1961)
- Doctoral advisors: Bernard Peters; Charles Potter
- Doctoral students: Gregor Yeates

Walter Clive Clark (22 October 1927 – 21 November 2019) was a New Zealand zoologist who specialised in the study of nematodes and pycnogonids. He was a professor at Massey University and later the University of Canterbury.

== Early life, family, and education ==
Born in Christchurch on 22 October 1927, Clark was the son of Clive Harold Clark and Ellen Martha Clark (née Baldwin). He had his early education at Bruce Bay, where his academic potential was first recognised, before moving back to Christchurch about the end of 1942. Clark later studied at Canterbury University College, graduating MSc with first-class honours in 1957. He was an assistant lecturer in biology at Christchurch Teachers' College from 1954 to 1955 and an assistant lecturer in zoology at Canterbury from 1956 to 1957. He was then a principal scientific officer in nematology in the entomology division of the Department of Scientific and Industrial Research (DSIR) in Nelson from 1957 to 1964. The DSIR supported Clark to undertake doctoral studies, and he completed a PhD at Imperial College London, supervised by Bernard Peters and Charles Potter, in 1961. The title of his doctoral thesis was Systematic and morphological studies on some Enoplida Nematoda, with special reference to the soil fauna of New Zealand.

In 1958, Clark married Gwenda Bellamy Goodman.

== Academic career ==
Clark was appointed professor of zoology at Massey University in 1964, but in 1967 he returned to Department of Zoology at the University of Canterbury as a reader (equivalent to associate professor). He rose to the rank of professor and also served as head of department. His main research interests were nematodes and pycnogonids. On his retirement from Canterbury in 1988, Clark was conferred the title of professor emeritus.

Among the research students supervised by Clark was Gregor Yeates, who completed his PhD on the ecology of nematodes in sand dunes in 1968.

== Later life and death ==
In retirement, Clark lived in the small town of Woodend. His first wife died in 1999, and he later remarried, to Clover. He died on 21 November 2019.
