= T. Brian Callister =

American physician

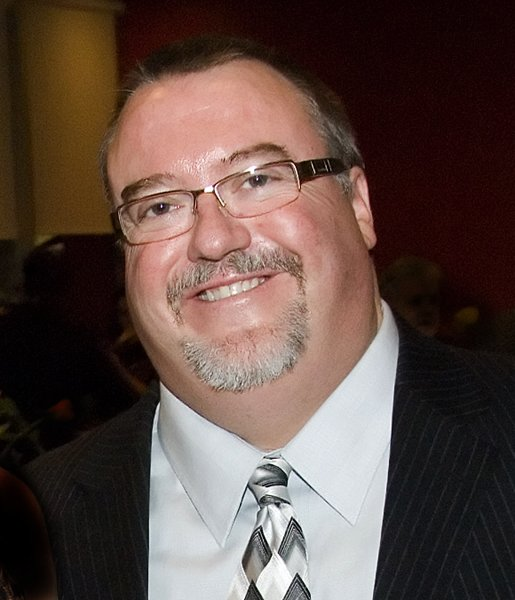
- Education: Stanford University
- Occupations: Physician and healthcare quality expert
- Employer: University of Nevada, Reno School of Medicine
- Known for: Outspoken critic of assisted suicide and euthanasia
- Website: www.doctorcallister.com

T. Brian Callister is an American physician who works on care transitions. He is a critic of assisted suicide and euthanasia. Callister was the National Medical Director, Chief Medical Officer and Senior Physician Executive at The LifeCare Family of Hospitals (now known as "LifeCare Health Partners"), a system of specialty care hospitals, from 2004 – 2016. He was an academic hospitalist and associate professor of internal medicine in Reno, Nevada. and is the governor-elect of Nevada for the American College of Physicians. Much of his work is focused on healthcare policy, quality improvement, and end-of-life issues.

== Education and career ==
Callister graduated from Stanford University with a degree in Economics, and received his M.D. from the University of Utah School Of Medicine. After finishing his residency at UCLA, he went to the Nye Regional Medical Center, where he also worked as a rural doctor in Tonopah. In 1995, he moved to Reno, where he co-founded the Sierra Hospitalists medical group. He also served as the Chief of the Medical Staff and as a Board Member for Catholic Healthcare West's St. Mary's Regional Medical Center.

In 2004, Callister was named the National Medical Director and Senior Physician Executive for LifeCare Hospitals, a position he held until 2016. Callister is an outspoken opponent of physician assisted suicide and euthanasia. Callister serves in a full-time academic role at the University of Nevada, Reno School of Medicine and is also an author and speaker.

== Offices and expert positions ==
As the Chairman of the Clinical Committee for the Acute Long Term Hospital Association (ALTHA), Callister led the effort to develop the first nationwide LTAC quality outcomes benchmark study, and he served on the association board. He has held office in the Nevada State Medical Association, first as treasurer and later as president. He was also president of the northern Nevada district of the American College of Physicians. He has served on the Technical Expert Panels for quality measure development at the Center for Medicare and Medicaid Services (CMS) and for the National Healthcare Safety Network (NHSN). He was the Nevada State Chairman for the American Medical Association's (AMA) Organized Medical Staff Section and the Healthcare Acquired Infection (HAI) antibiotic stewardship program. In 2018, Callister was elected as the next Governor of Nevada for the American College of Physicians and was named a Senior Fellow of the Society of Hospital Medicine.

== Awards and honors ==
In 2011, Callister was awarded the Volunteerism and Community Service Award by the American College of Physicians. In 2012, he was nominated by Modern Healthcare as one of "50 Most Influential Physician Executives in Healthcare". He was also selected to speak at the American Hospital Association's 2012 Leadership Summit. Callister received the 2018 "Hero for Life" award at the 12th Annual Friends for Life Dinner for his work against physician assisted suicide.
