= Vince Legarza =

American basketball player and coach (born 1989)

Milwaukee Bucks
- Position: Assistant coach
- League: NBA

Personal information
- Born: October 13, 1989 (age 37)

Career information
- High school: St. Ignatius Prep (San Francisco, California)
- College: Miami (Ohio) (2009–2013)
- NBA draft: 2013: undrafted
- Coaching career: 2013–2026

Career history

Coaching
- 2013–2015: Atlanta Hawks (player development)
- 2015–2018: Minnesota Timberwolves (player development)
- 2018–2022: Utah Jazz (assistant)
- 2022–2023: Milwaukee Bucks (assistant)
- 2024–2026: Phoenix Suns (assistant)
- 2026–present: Milwaukee Bucks (assistant)

Vincent Michael Legarza (born October 13, 1989) is an American professional basketball assistant coach for the Milwaukee Bucks of the National Basketball Association (NBA).

== College career ==
Legarza played at Miami University in Ohio from 2009 to 2013. Legarza's RedHawks didn't qualify for the NCAA tournament in his four years at the school. He averaged 1.2 points per game during his four-year college career at Miami. In three seasons, Legarza was team captain of the basketball team.

Legarza made his collegiate debut on November 13, 2009, in a 82–71 loss to Towson. He recorded a career high in scoring on March 5, 2013, in a 72–58 loss to Akron, scoring 10 points. Legarza's college career ended with a March 13, 2013, loss to Eastern Michigan in the second round of the 2013 MAC tournament.

== Coaching career ==
Legarza began his NBA coaching career in 2013 as a player development coach with the Atlanta Hawks under head coach Mike Budenholzer.

In 2015, Legarza was named as a player development coach for the Minnesota Timberwolves. With the Timberwolves, Legarza worked closely with future All-Star Karl-Anthony Towns.

In 2018, Legarza joined the Utah Jazz as an assistant coach under head coach Quin Snyder.

In 2022, Legarza was hired as an assistant coach for the Milwaukee Bucks under head coach Mike Budenholzer.

In 2024, Legarza was hired as an assistant coach for the Phoenix Suns, reuniting with Budenholzer in Phoenix. Legarza was the Suns coach for the 2024 NBA Summer League in Las Vegas. He left the team in January 2026 to become a consultant for the Atlanta Hawks.

On August 7, 2026, Legarza returned to the Bucks as an assistant coach under head coach Taylor Jenkins.
