= The Ox-Bow Incident =

1943 film

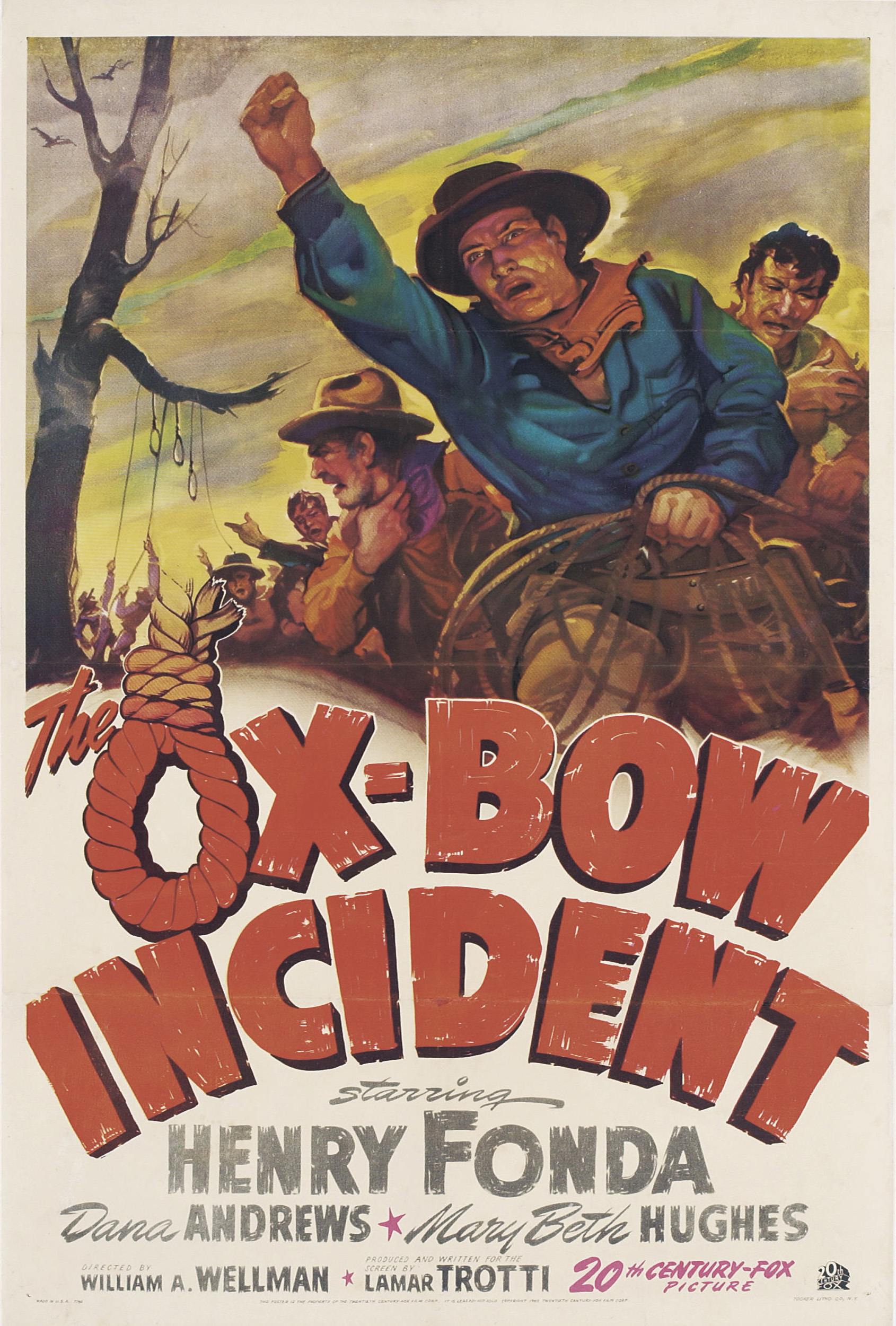
- Theatrical release poster
- Directed by: William A. Wellman
- Written by: Lamar Trotti
- Based on: The Ox-Bow Incident by Walter Van Tilburg Clark
- Produced by: Lamar Trotti
- Starring: Henry Fonda; Dana Andrews
- Cinematography: Arthur C. Miller
- Edited by: Allen McNeil
- Music by: Cyril J. Mockridge
- Distributed by: 20th Century Fox
- Release dates: May 8, 1943 (New York City); May 21, 1943 (USA)
- Running time: 75 minutes
- Country: United States
- Language: English
- Budget: $565,000
- Box office: $750,000 (rentals)

The Ox-Bow Incident is a 1943 American Western film directed by William A. Wellman, starring Henry Fonda, Dana Andrews and Mary Beth Hughes, with Anthony Quinn, William Eythe, Harry Morgan and Jane Darwell.

Two cowboys arrive in a Western town, when news arrives that a local rancher has been murdered and his cattle stolen. The townspeople, joined by the two cowboys and cowboys from other ranches, form a posse to catch the perpetrators. They find three men in possession of the cattle, and are determined to see justice done on the spot. The Ox-Bow Incident and The Outlaw (also produced in 1943) are the earliest films in the AllMovie list of psychological Westerns.

The film premiered in May 1943 to positive reviews from critics. It is one of a select group of films to secure its only Oscar nomination in the Best Picture category—it received no other nominations in any other Oscar category. This particular circumstance happened 16 times between 1927 and 1943, but as of 2025 and beyond, the Ox-Bow Incident is the last film whose sole Oscar nomination was in the Best Picture category.^{A}

In 1998, the film was selected for preservation in the United States National Film Registry by the Library of Congress as being "culturally, historically, or aesthetically significant". The film was adapted from the 1940 novel of the same name, written by Nevadan Walter Van Tilburg Clark.

== Plot ==
In Bridger's Wells, Nevada, in 1885, two cowboys, Art Croft and Gil Carter, hitch up their horses and enter Darby's Saloon. There, it is learned that a rancher, Larry Kinkaid, has been murdered. The townspeople immediately form a large posse to pursue the murderers. Art and Gil join. Davies, fearing a lynching, also joins, hoping he can prevent such an occurrence. Major Tetley, dressed in an old Civil War uniform, assumes leadership. His son, Gerald, comes with him. Soon, news arrives that three men with cattle bearing Kinkaid's brand have just entered Bridger's Pass.

Later that night in Ox-Bow Canyon, the posse find three men sleeping, with what are presumed to be stolen cattle nearby. The posse interrogate them: a young, well-spoken man, Donald Martin; a Mexican, Juan Martínez; and an old man, Alva Hardwicke, who is clearly senile. Martin claims that he purchased the cattle from Kinkaid but received no bill of sale. No one believes Martin, and the posse decide to hang the three men at sunrise. As a final request, Martin writes a letter to his wife and asks Davies to deliver it. When dissent develops among some members of the group, a vote is taken on whether to hang the trio or take them to town to stand trial. Only seven vote for a trial, including Major Tetley's son, Gerald. The rest support a hanging.

After the lynching, the posse returns to Bridger's Wells. On the way, they encounter the town's sheriff, Risley, who reveals Kinkaid is not dead and that the men who shot him have been arrested. Risley then asks Davies who is responsible for the lynching. “All but seven,” Davies replies, and the sheriff angrily declares, “God better have mercy on you. You won't get any from me.” Later, the posse gather in Darby's Saloon. In silence, they listen as Gil quietly reads Martin's letter aloud to Art. Meanwhile, Major Tetley returns to his house, locks his son out after calling him a coward, and commits suicide. In the end, Gil and Art head out of town to deliver the letter, $500 raised by those in the posse for Martin's wife, and to look after her and the children.

== Cast ==
- Henry Fonda as Gil Carter
- Dana Andrews as Donald Martin
- Harry Morgan as Art Croft (as Henry Morgan)
- Frank Conroy as Major Tetley
- Harry Davenport as Mr. Arthur Davies
- Anthony Quinn as Juan Martínez / Francisco Morez, The Mexican
- Francis Ford as Alva Hardwicke, The Old Man
- William Eythe as Gerald Tetley
- Mary Beth Hughes as Rose Mapen / Rose Swanson
- Jane Darwell as "Ma" Jenny Grier
- Marc Lawrence as Jeff Farnley
- Paul Hurst as Monty Smith
- Chris-Pin Martin as Poncho
- Leigh Whipper as Sparks (uncredited)
- Stanley Andrews as Bartlett (uncredited)
- Victor Kilian as Darby, bartender
- Matt Briggs as Judge Daniel Tyler
- Willard Robertson as Sheriff Risley
- Dick Rich as Deputy Butch Mapes (uncredited)
- George Meeker as Mr. Swanson, Rose's husband (uncredited)
- Billy Benedict as young man with news (uncredited)
- Margaret Hamilton as Judge Tyler's housekeeper (uncredited)
- Hank Bell as Red (uncredited)

== Production ==
Director William A. Wellman loved the novel and wanted to adapt it into a film and then interested Darryl F. Zanuck in producing it. Zanuck agreed in producing the story, on the condition that Wellman would also direct two other films for the studio, Thunder Birds (1942) and Buffalo Bill (1944).

There are several differences between the film and the novel, notably the fate of the Tetleys and the fate of the lynch mob. In the book, young Gerald commits suicide by hanging himself in the barn. This leads his father to fall on his cavalry sword. The sheriff stares down each member of the mob, but then he says he will forget everything.

The role of Gil Carter, played by Henry Fonda, was originally offered to Gary Cooper, who turned it down. Fonda was generally unhappy with the quality of the films he was cast in while under contract with 20th Century Fox. This was one of only two films from that period that he was enthusiastic about acting in (the other was The Grapes of Wrath, made in 1940). Fonda regarded this film as one of his favorites.

Filming was done from late June to early August 1942, mostly in studio back-lots and sound stages; a limited amount of location shooting was done at a ranch in Chatsworth and in Lone Pine, both in California. Additional sequences and retakes were done mid-August to late August. The production on the film would be shut down for a week or ten days "due to the $5,000-per-film limit on new construction materials" imposed by the War Production Board. During the shutdown, already used sets were torn down so their materials could be used to build the mountain pass set. Studio publicity noted that the Ox-Bow Valley setting was "the largest set ever constructed" by Fox, covering 26,703 sq ft (2,480.8 m^{2}; 0.6130 acres).

The western street set seen in this film was subsequently duplicated in another western, The Gunfighter (1950), which starred Gregory Peck.

After the film was completed, it was kept on the shelf for months because Fox executives were uncertain how to market a film with such a sobering theme.

== Reception ==
The film received mostly positive reviews. Bosley Crowther of The New York Times wrote that it "is not a picture which will brighten or cheer your day. But it is one which, for sheer, stark drama, is currently hard to beat." Variety called it a "powerful preachment against mob lynching ... Director William Wellman has skillfully guided the characters and driven home the point that hanging is unwarranted. Fonda measures up to star rating ... He helps hold together the loose ends of the rather patent plot." David Lardner of The New Yorker called it a "rather good piece of work". Harrison's Reports printed a negative review, calling it a "depressing, unpleasant, at times horrible, melodrama ... Whoever is responsible for selecting such sordid material for the screen should be awarded a 'booby' prize." In The Nation in 1943, critic James Agee wrote, "Ox-Bow is one of the best and most interesting pictures I have seen for a long time, and it disappointed me ... It seems to me that in Ox-Bow artifice and nature got jammed in such a way as to give a sort of double focus ... Here was a remarkably controlled and intelligent film; and in steady nimbus, on every detail, was the stiff over-consciousness of those who made it of the excellence of each effect, to such a degree that the whole thing seemed a mosaic of over-appreciated effects which continually robbed nature of its own warmth and energy, and the makers of the ambitious claims which they had made on nature."

In his 1957 book, Novels into Film: The Metamorphosis of Fiction into Cinema, George Bluestone cited the film as one of Hollywood's most perfect examples of adapting a great novel, concluding that "William Wellman and Lamar Trotti were able to accomplish cinematically what Walter Van Tilburg Clark accomplished in language." More recently, La Furia Umana's Toshi Fujiwara said the film is "one of the most important westerns in the history of American cinema". Clint Eastwood has stated this is his favorite film. However, Darryl F. Zanuck, head of Twentieth Century-Fox 1935–1956, recalled the film as "a flop. In spite of its significance and its dramatic value, our records showed that it had failed to pay its way. In fact, its pulling power was less than that of a Laurel and Hardy comedy we made about the same time."

The movie earned $750,000 in the United States.

== Awards and honors ==
The film was nominated for the Academy Award for Best Picture at the 16th Academy Awards, losing to Casablanca. As of 2025 and beyond, it is the last film to have been nominated for Best Picture and nothing else. The February 2020 issue at Vulture lists The Ox-Bow Incident on a list of "The Best Movies That Lost Best Picture at the Oscars".

An outdoor mural at Twentieth Century Fox Studios, Century City, depicts the filming of The Ox-Bow Incident.

== See also ==
- Trial movies

== Notes ==
A. The only film to win Best Picture, and be nominated in no other Oscar category, was Grand Hotel (1932).
