= Jennifer Mabus =

American YouTuber and hiker

- Born: November 6, 1989 (age 36); Reno, Nevada, United States
- Other names: "The Whimsical Woman", "Starburst"
- Education: University of Nevada, Reno
- Occupations: YouTuber; hiker; engineer
- Known for: Thru-hiking the Pacific Crest Trail
- Spouse: Owen Frederick (m. 2019)
- Children: 1
- Website: thewhimsicalwoman.com

Jennifer Mabus (born November 6, 1989) is an American YouTuber and hiker. She spent 173 days thru-hiking the Pacific Crest Trail solo in 2018, filming every day of the journey, and posting vlogs to her YouTube channel covering every day of the journey as she hiked. She competed collegiately in cheerleading for the Nevada Wolf Pack.

== Background ==
Mabus was born November 6, 1989, in Reno, Nevada, United States. As a child she was a gymnast and dreamed of competing at the Olympic Games. Due to multiple injuries she took an alternate pathway, instead graduating in 2012 with her bachelor's degree in mechanical engineering from the University of Nevada, Reno where she was a student athlete, competing as part of the Nevada Wolf Pack as a cheerleader.

== Career ==
=== 2017–2018 ===
In 2017, Mabus started blogging and publishing videos on her YouTube channel. On October 15, 2017, she filmed a thru-hike with her friend Emma at The Enchantments, publishing her first vlog of a thru-hike on YouTube three days later, October 18, of their hike.

==== 2018 Pacific Crest Trail northbound thru-hike ====
For 173 days in 2018 she thru-hiked the Pacific Crest Trail, PCT, from south (United States-side of the United States–Mexico border) to north (Canada), making the 2,653-mile journey on foot on her own (solo) and vlogging the journey as she hiked. She started hiking the trail with her father on Saturday April 14, 2018, and finished the trail solo on Wednesday October 3, 2018. The trail name she earned during the journey was "Starburst" in allusion to her brightly colored backpack. Video footage of the hike she published on YouTube as she hiked included every day of her 173 day journey, she edited her own videos, and posted the vlogs as she hiked with a few of the videos delayed in posting due to trail conditions, such as a lack of internet/cell phone connectivity, as well as running out of storage space on her filming device. She was one of 1,186 hikers to make history in 2018 by setting an all-time record for the most number of hikers to cross the finish line in a given year of the trail's over 65 years of existence, which is a record that remains unbroken as of mid-April 2022. The total thru-hike cost her $8,446.81, which included supplies, food and lodging, and miscellaneous expenses such as excursions to the spa and to see a SpaceX rocket launch.

From the duration of the thru-hike, Mabus published 130 videos on YouTube that she filmed while hiking on-trail between day one and day 173, inclusive.

Video type	# of videos	First video published date	First video publishing delay	Last video published date	Last video publishing delay
Vlog of day(s) on-trail	124	April 17, 2018	3 days	November 14, 2018	42 days
Update while on-trail	2	May 30, 2018	–	September 2, 2018	–
List of supplies (hiking gear for on-trail)	1	June 10, 2018	–	June 10, 2018	–
Question and answer	2	June 20, 2018	–	September 21, 2018	–
Compilation of highlights from a section of the trail	1	July 8, 2018	–	July 8, 2018	–
Total	130	April 17, 2018	3 days	November 14, 2018	42 days

=== 2019–2021 ===
October 2019 she married U.S. Navy diver Owen Frederick and in October 2021 they had a son, Finley "Finn" Mabus Frederick, together. Following their marriage, Mabus coped with his deployment through the COVID-19 pandemic by continuing her joined thru-hiking and YouTube pursuits, vlogging her thru-hike of the 171-mile Tahoe Rim Trail in August 2020, which she accomplished hiking with fellow thru-hiker and YouTuber Dyana Carmella for the entirety of the trail. On August 14, 2020, she competed the trail and was inducted into the "165 mile club" of hikers who had completed the thru-hike by the Tahoe Rim Trail Association.

==== 2020 Tahoe Rim Trail thru-hike YouTube documentation ====
The following videos Mabus published on YouTube documenting her 2020 Tahoe Rim Trail thru-hike.

No.	Day	Date (hiking)	Miles	Video duration	Date (video published)	Video title
1	1	August 1, 2020	0 – 7.5	24:10	August 23, 2020	"Tahoe Rim Trail // Tahoe City to Ward Creek - Part 1"
2	2	August 2, 2020	7.5 – 19.4	20:51	August 27, 2020	"Tahoe Rim Trail // Ward Creek to Bear Lake Outlet - Part 2"
3	3	August 3, 2020	19.4 – 33.3	21:40	September 2, 2020	"Tahoe Rim Trail // Bear Lake Outlet to Fontanillis Lake - Part 3"
4	4	August 4, 2020	33.3 – 42.8	14:05	September 6, 2020	"Tahoe Rim Trail // Fontanillis Lake to Lake Aloha (Desolation Wilderness) - Part 4"
5	5	August 5, 2020	42.8 – 54.0	15:29	September 13, 2020	"Tahoe Rim Trail // Lake Aloha to Echo Chalet for Resupply - Part 5"
6	6	August 6, 2020	54.0 – 69.4	13:28	September 18, 2020	"Tahoe Rim Trail // Saying Goodbye to the PCT - Part 6"
7	7	August 7, 2020	np^{[a]}	15:06	September 26, 2020	"Tahoe Rim Trail // Star Lake - Part 7"
8	8	August 8, 2020	np^{[a]}	16:12	October 10, 2020	"Tahoe Rim Trail // Epic Campsite - Part 8"
9	9	August 9, 2020	np^{[a]}	9:11	October 20, 2020	"Tahoe Rim Trail // Spooner Lake Trailhead - Part 9"
10	10	August 10, 2020	np^{[a]}	11:57	October 28, 2020	"Tahoe Rim Trail // Spooner Summit Trailhead to Marlette Peak Campground - Part 10"
11	10	August 10, 2020	np^{[a]}	12:48	November 4, 2020	"Tahoe Rim Trail // Water Pumps and Thunderstorms - Part 11"
12	11	August 11, 2020	np^{[a]}	18:22	November 16, 2020	"Tahoe Rim Trail // Relay Peak - Part 12"
13	12	August 12, 2020	np^{[a]}	16:19	December 2, 2020	"Tahoe Rim Trail // Relay Peak to Brockway Trailhead - Part 13"
14	13	August 13, 2020	np^{[a]}	12:37	December 14, 2020	"Tahoe Rim Trail // Last Full Day - Part 14"
15	14	August 14, 2020	np^{[a]}	13:27	December 22, 2020	"Tahoe Rim Trail // FINAL DAY: Tahoe City Bound - Part 15"

^{a} Miles hiked not in video documentation.

== YouTube documented thru-hikes ==
No.	Name	Location	Direction	Miles	Type	Status	Date started	Date finished	# of days	# of videos	Ref
1	The Enchantments	Washington	Out-and-back	20.0	Duo (2 people)	Finished	October 15, 2017	October 15, 2017	1	1	
2	Pacific Crest Trail	United States, Canada	Northbound	2,652.8	Solo (1 person)	Finished	April 14, 2018	October 3, 2018	173	130	
3	Tahoe Rim Trail	Nevada, California	Counterclockwise	171.0	Duo (2 people)	Finished	August 1, 2020	August 14, 2020	14	15	

== Influence ==
=== Making the unknown visible ===
One of the full-time hikers Mabus has influenced is Lily Tagariello, who in part derived her motivation and confidence for successfully thru-hiking the Pacific Crest Trail in 2021 from watching Mabus's vlogs, which made a trail she had not been to before tangible virtually from afar, stating to Kinute of the impact, Lily Tagariello said, "Thru-hiking became the only thing I cared about, even before I ever stepped foot on the PCT."
