= Wally Clark (English footballer) =

English footballer

Personal information
- Full name: Wallace Clark
- Date of birth: 14 July 1896
- Place of birth: Jarrow, England
- Date of death: 20 December 1975 (aged 79)
- Place of death: Jarrow, England
- Height: 5 ft 6 in (1.68 m)
- Position: Outside forward

Senior career*
Years	Team	Apps	(Gls)
- Durham City
1919–1921	Middlesbrough	8	(0)
1921–1923	Leeds United	13	(0)
1923–1924	Birmingham	32	(0)
1924–1925	Coventry City	8	(0)
1925–1926	Boston Town		
1926–1927	Barrow	16	(2)
1930–193?	Connah's Quay & Shotton		
- * Club domestic league appearances and goals

Wallace Clark (14 July 1896 – 20 December 1975) was an English professional footballer who played as an outside forward. He scored two goals in 80 appearances in the Football League playing for Middlesbrough, Leeds United, Birmingham, Coventry City and Barrow.

Clark was born in Jarrow, County Durham, and began his football career with Durham City before joining Middlesbrough when the Football League resumed after the First World War. Two seasons later he was transferred to Leeds United for a fee of £460, and in March 1923 moved on to Birmingham. He played regularly until he suffered an injury towards the end of the 1923–24 season, and did not play for the first team again, moving on to Coventry City in October 1924. After that he spent no more than a year with any club, playing for Boston Town in the Midland League, returning to the Football League with Barrow, then the Cheshire County League with Connah's Quay & Shotton. He went on to play bowls, and became vice-president of Jarrow Bowling Club.

He died in his native Jarrow aged 79.
