= Donald R. Mello =

American politician

Member of the Nevada General Assembly
- In office 1963–1982

Member of the Nevada Senate from the 2nd district
- In office 1982–1989

Personal details
- Born: Donald Ray Mello; June 22, 1934 (age 92) Owensboro, Kentucky, U.S.
- Party: Democratic
- Spouse: Barbara Jane Woodhall

Donald Ray Mello (born June 22, 1934), was an American politician who was a Democratic member of the Nevada Assembly. He is an alumnus of the University of Nevada-Reno and the B.F. Goodrich Management School. Mello is a former conductor with the Southern Pacific Transportation Company.
