= Charles Potter (entomologist) =

English entomologist

Charles Potter FRES (3 January 1907 – 10 December 1989) was an English entomologist known for his work on stored product insects and their management. He devised a laboratory technique for standardized insecticide treatment using an atomized spray to cover a surface uniformly. The equipment he designed for this purpose is now known as the Potter spray tower.

Potter was born in England and worked on stored product insects at the Imperial College in London. In order to study insecticides and conduct bioassays he designed a precision spray applicator at Rothamsted Experimental Station where he was the head of the Insecticides and Fungicides Department. He identified and studied the photodegradation of natural pyrethroids and their synthetic analogs.

Potter received a Congressional Medal at the Third International Congress of Crop Protection, and from the UNESCO for his work on synthetic pyrethroids. He served as a president of the Association of Applied Biologists and as vice president of the Royal Entomological Society.
