= Walter Van Tilburg Clark =

Novelist, short story writer, educator

- Born: August 3, 1909; East Orland, Maine, US
- Died: November 10, 1971 (aged 62); Virginia City, Nevada, US
- Education: University of Nevada, Reno (BA, MA)
- Occupations: Writer, college teacher
- Spouse: Barbara Frances Morse (d. 1969)
- Children: 2
- Writing career
- Years active: 1932–1971
- Genres: Novel, short story
- Notable works: The Ox-Bow Incident, The Watchful Gods and Other Stories
- Notable awards: O. Henry Prize, Nevada Writer's Hall of Fame

Walter Van Tilburg Clark (August 3, 1909 – November 10, 1971) was an American novelist, short story writer, poet, and educator. He ranks as one of Nevada's most distinguished literary figures of the 20th century, and was the first inductee into the 'Nevada Writers Hall of Fame' in 1988, together with Robert Laxalt, Clark's mentee and Nevada's other heralded twentieth century author. Two of Clark's novels, The Ox-Bow Incident and The Track of the Cat, were made into films. As a writer, Clark taught himself to use the familiar materials of the western saga to explore the human psyche and to raise deep philosophical issues.

== Biography ==
Clark was born in East Orland, Maine, but grew up in Reno, Nevada and graduated from Reno High School in 1926. Clark went to college at the University of Nevada, Reno, where his father Walter Ernest Clark was president. In 1933 Clark married Barbara Frances Morse and moved to Cazenovia, New York, where he taught high school English and began his fiction-writing career.

Clark's first published novel, The Ox-Bow Incident (1940), was successful and is often considered to be the first modern Western, without the usual clichés and formulaic plots of the genre. The novel is a story about a lynch mob mistaking three innocent travelers for cattle rustlers suspected of murder. After the travelers are hanged, the lynch mob finds that they killed the wrong suspects. The novel's themes include an examination of frontier law and order, as well as culpability. The novel was well-received, gave Clark literary acclaim that was unusual for a writer of Westerns, and in 1943 was adapted into a movie starring Henry Fonda and Harry Morgan.

Over the next decade, Clark published two more novels: The City of Trembling Leaves (1945) and The Track of the Cat (1949). In 1950, a collection of short stories, The Watchful Gods and Other Stories, was released. Since they began appearing in national magazines during the 1940s, Clark's short stories gained national recognition and earned the O. Henry Prize five times, in quick succession, between 1941 and 1945. After this initial success in the short story format, some of these stories (notably "Hook" and "The Wind And The Snow Of Winter") have been repeatedly anthologized as classic examples of the genre. Clark's short story, "The Portable Phonograph" - a poignant depiction of survivors in the aftermath of a war (and not a nuclear war as some claim, since it was written in 1941) - is also well known. Two Hollywood films were inspired by Clark's writings, and one of these (The Ox-Bow Incident) received an Academy Award nomination for Best Picture. The other film was Track of the Cat, based on Clark's novel The Track of the Cat. (Note that the film's title drops the definite article used in the novel's title).

Although he continued to write more sporadically after 1950, Clark published no more fiction works during the remaining two decades of his life. Thereafter, Clark devoted his creative energies to teaching and lecturing. From 1954 to 1956, he was a professor of creative writing at the University of Montana in Missoula, where he was noted by his students for his teaching skills and for his eccentric clothing which consisted of a blue turtleneck shirt, maroon corduroy jacket, grey slacks and blue socks which never varied throughout the term. Clark began teaching at a writer's workshop at San Francisco State University during the summer of 1955, moving to San Francisco in 1956 after he was hired there full-time to establish a formal Creative Writing Program. He remained there until 1962.

Clark would return to Reno to serve as the writer-in-residence at the university from 1962 until his death from cancer in Virginia City, Nevada, on November 10, 1971, at age 62. He spent the last ten years of his life editing The Journals of Alfred Doten. He died almost two years after the death of his wife Barbara (Frances Morse) Clark. Both of them died of cancer, as Clark's biographer Jackson J. Benson noted in his biography of Clark, The Ox-Bow Man. Clark was chosen, along with Robert Laxalt, to be the first writer inducted into the Nevada Writers Hall of Fame when it was established in 1988 by the Friends of the University of Nevada Libraries.

== Books by Clark ==
Fiction

- The Ox-Bow Incident, Random House (New York, NY), 1940; published with an introduction by Clifton Fadiman, Heritage, 1942; published with an afterword by W. P. Webb, Armed Services Edition, 1943, New American Library (New York, NY), 1960; reprinted, Modern Library Paperback Classics (New York, NY), 2001.
- The City of Trembling Leaves, Random House (New York, NY), 1945; published as Tim Hazard, Kimber (England), Armed Services Edition, 1946; 1951(an abridged version). Reprinted as part of the Western Literature Series, University of Nevada Press (Reno, NV), 1991, 2003. With a "Foreword" by Robert Laxalt.
- The Track of the Cat, Random House (New York, NY), 1949, reprinted, University of Nevada Press (Reno, NV), 1993, 2003, with an "Afterword" by Walter Van Tilburg Clark.
- The Watchful Gods and Other Stories, Random House (New York, NY), 1950. (contains "Hook," "The Wind and the Snow of Winter," "The Rapids," "The Anonymous," "The Buck in the Hills," "Why Don't You Look Where You're Going?," "The Indian Well," "The Fish Who Could Close His Eyes," "The Portable Phonograph," and "The Watchful Gods"). Reprinted, University of Nevada Press (Reno, NV), 2004. With a "Foreword" by Ann Ronald

Poetry

- Christmas Comes to Hjalsen (1930)
- "Dawn, Washoe Valley; Big Dusk; Pyramid Lake" (1932)
- Ten Women in Gale's House: And Shorter Poems (1932)
- "To a Friend with New Shoes" (1934)

Other

- (Author of foreword) Robert Cole Caples: A Retrospective Exhibition, 1927-63 (catalog), [Reno, NV], 1964.
- (Editor) The Journals of Alfred Doten, 1849-1903, three volumes, University of Nevada Press (Reno, NV), 1973. Online edition username and password: doten
- Walter Van Tilburg Clark: Critiques, edited by Charlton Laird; University of Nevada Press (Reno, NV), 1983. In this volume, some of Clark's works were collected and grouped with essays about Clark and his writings
