= Bibliography of encyclopedias =

This is a comprehensive list of every encyclopedic or biographical dictionary ever published in any language, excluding reprinted editions, organized alphabetically by theme and language. It includes any work resembling A–Z encyclopedias or encyclopedic dictionaries in both print and online formats. All entries are in English unless specified. Some works may be listed under multiple topics due to thematic overlap.

For a simplified list without bibliographical details, see Lists of encyclopedias.

== Archaeology ==
- Collins Dictionary of Archaeology. Edited by Paul G. Bahn. Glasgow: HarperCollins, 1992.
- Bahn, Paul G. The new Penguin dictionary of archaeology. Penguin, 2004. ISBN 0-14-051447-3.
- Encyclopedia of the Archaeology of Ancient Egypt. Edited by Kathryn A. Bard. Abingdon, Oxon.: Routledge, 1999.
- Companion Encyclopedia of Archaeology. Edited by Graeme Barker. London: Routledge, 1999.
- Blackwell Encyclopedia of Industrial Archaeology. Blackwell, 1993.
- Champion, Sara. A dictionary of terms and techniques in archaeology. Phaidon, 1980. ISBN 0-7148-2117-9.
- Cottrell, Leonard. The concise encyclopedia of archaeology. Hutchinson, 1974. ISBN 0-09-118450-9.
- Crabtree, Pam J. Medieval archaeology: An encyclopedia. Garland, 2001. ISBN 0-8153-1286-5.
- Darvill, Timothy. The concise Oxford dictionary of archaeology. Oxford University Press, 2002. ISBN 0-19-211649-5.
- Ellis, Linda. Archaeological method and theory: An encyclopedia. Garland, 2000. ISBN 978-0-8153-1305-2.
- Evans, Susan Toby, David L. Webster. Archaeology of ancient Mexico and Central America: An encyclopedia. Garland, 2001. ISBN 0-8153-0887-6.
- Ghosh, A. An Encyclopedia of Indian Archaeology. Munshiram Manoharlal, 1989.
- Leroi-Gourham, André, José Garanger, Dominique Baffier. Dictionnaire de la préhistoire. Presses universitaires de France, 1988. ISBN 2-13-041459-1. (French)
- Lobban, Richard (2004). Historical Dictionary of Ancient and Medieval Nubia. Scarecrow Press. ISBN 978-0-8108-4784-2.
- The Oxford Encyclopedia of Archaeology in the Near East. Edited by Eric M. Meyers. Oxford University Press, 1997. Also available at https://www.oxfordreference.com/
- Murray, Tim. Encyclopedia of archaeology: History and discoveries. ABC-CLIO, 2001. ISBN 1-57607-198-7.
- Murray, Tim. Milestones in archaeology: A chronological encyclopedia. ABC-CLIO, 2007. ISBN 978-1-57607-186-1.
- Pearsall, Deborah M. Encyclopedia of archaeology. Elsevier, 2007. ISBN 978-0-12-548030-7.
- Renfrew, Colin, Paul G. Bahn. Archaeology: The key concepts. Routledge, 2005. ISBN 0-415-31757-6.
- Saunders, Nicholas J. Peoples of the Caribbean: An encyclopedia of archeology and traditional culture. ABC-CLIO, 2005. ISBN 1-57607-701-2.
- The Cambridge Encyclopedia of Archaeology. Edited by Andrew Sherratt. Cambridge University Press, 1980.
- Whitehouse, Ruth. The Facts on File dictionary of archaeology. (British title: The Macmillan dictionary of archaeology.). Facts on File, 1984. ISBN 0-87196-048-6.

=== Biblical archaeology ===
- Avi-Yonah, Michael, ed. (1975–1978). Entsiklopedyah la-hafrot arke'ologiyoi be-Erets Yisrael [Encyclopedia of Archaeological Excavations in the Holy Land]. Englewood Cliffs, NJ: Prentice-Hall.
- Blaiklock, Edward M. and R. K. Harrison, ed. (1983). The New International Dictionary of Biblical Archaeology. Grand Rapids, MI: Regency Reference Library, Zondervan.
- Cabrol, Fernand, Henri Leclercq, Henri Marrou. Dictionnaire d'archéologie chrétienne et de liturgie. Letouzey et Ané, 1907–[1953].
- Negev, Avraham, ed. (1972). Archaeological Encyclopedia of the Holy Land. New York: Putnam's.
- Pfeiffer, Charles F., ed. (1966). The Biblical World: A Dictionary of Biblical Archaeology. Grand Rapids, MI: Baker Book House.
- Stern, Ephraim. The New Encyclopedia of Archaeological Excavations in the Holy Land. rev. ed., Simon & Schuster, 1993.

=== Classical archaeology ===
- De Grummond, Nancy Thomson. An encyclopedia of the history of classical archaeology. Greenwood Press, 1996. ISBN 0-313-22066-2.
- Stillwell, Richard. Princeton Encyclopedia of Classical Sites. Princeton University Press, 1976.

== Area studies ==
- Kurian, George Thomas. Encyclopedia of the First, Second, and the Third World. 4th ed., Facts on File, 1991.

=== Africa ===
- Shoup, John A. Ethnic groups of Africa and the Middle East: an encyclopedia. ABC-CLIO, 2011. ISBN 978-1-59884-363-7 .
- Stanton, Andrea L. Cultural sociology of the Middle East, Asia, & Africa: an encyclopedia. Sage Publications, 2012. ISBN 978-1-4129-8176-7.

=== Americas ===
==== Latin America and the Caribbean ====
- Carrasco, David. The Oxford encyclopedia of Mesoamerican cultures: The civilizations of Mexico and Central America. Oxford University Press, 2001. ISBN 0-19-510815-9. (3 vols.)
- Steward, Julian Haynes, Jay I. Kislak Reference Collection (Library of Congress). Handbook of South American Indians. U.S. Government Printing Office, 1946–59.
- Taylor, Patrick, Frederick Ivor Case, Sean Meighoo, Joyce Leung. The encyclopedia of Caribbean religions. University of Illinois Press, 2013. ISBN 978-0-252-03723-8.
- Tenenbaum, Barbara A. Encyclopedia of Latin American History and Culture. New York: Charles Scribner's Sons 1996. (5 vols.)
- Wauchope, Robert, ed. Jay I. Kislak Reference Collection (Library of Congress). Handbook of Middle American Indians. University of Texas Press, [1964–76]. ISBN 0-292-70014-8.
- Werner, Michael. Encyclopedia of Mexico. Chicago: Fitzroy Dearborn, 1997. (2 vols.)

==== North America ====
- Alderfer, Jonathan K., National Geographic Society (U. S.). National Geographic complete birds of North America. National Geographic, 2006. ISBN 0-7922-4175-4.
- Bailey, L. H., Ethel Zoe Bailey, Liberty Hyde Bailey, Hortorium. Hortus third: A concise dictionary of plants cultivated in the United States and Canada. Macmillan, 1976. ISBN 0-02-505470-8.
- Beacham, Walton, Frank V. Castronova, Suzanne Sessine. Beacham's guide to the endangered species of North America. Gale Group, 2001. ISBN 0-7876-5028-5.
- Burns, Russell M., Barbara H. Honkala, U.S. Dept. of Agriculture, Forest Service. Silvics of North America. U.S. Dept. of Agriculture, Forest Service, 1990. .
- Burrows, George E. Toxic plants of North America. Wiley-Blackwell, 2012. ISBN 978-0-8138-2034-7, doi:10.1002/9781118413425.
- Clark, William S., Brian K. Wheeler. A field guide to hawks of North America. Houghton Mifflin, 2001. ISBN 0-395-67067-5.
- Dunn, Jon, Jonathan K. Alderfer, National Geographic Society (U.S.). National Geographic field guide to the birds of North America. National Geographic, 2006. ISBN 0-7922-5314-0.
- Ernst, Carl H. Evelyn M. Ernst. Snakes of the United States and Canada. Smithsonian Books, 2003. ISBN 1-58834-019-8.
- Eschmeyer, William N., Earl Stannard Herald, Howard Hammann. A field guide to Pacific Coast fishes of North America: From the Gulf of Alaska to Baja, California. Houghton Mifflin, 1983. ISBN 0-395-33188-9.
  - Flora of North America Association. Flora of North America. Flora of North America Association. .
- Little, Elbert Luther, Sonja Bullaty, Angelo Lomeo, National Audubon Society. The Audubon Society field guide to North American trees. Knopf, 1980. ISBN 0-394-50761-4.
- Mitchell, Alan. Trees of North America. Facts on File, 1987.
- Page, Lawrence M., Brooks M. Burr, Eugene C. Beckham III, National Audubon Society. A field guide to freshwater fishes: North America north of Mexico. Houghton Mifflin, 1991. ISBN 0-395-91091-9.
- Reid, Daniel G. Dictionary of Christianity in America: A Comprehensive Resource on the Religious Impulse That Shaped a Continent. Intervarsity, 1990.
- Reid, Fiona, National Audubon Society. A field guide to mammals of North America, north of Mexico. Houghton Mifflin, 2006. ISBN 0-395-93596-2.
- Robbins, Chandler S., Bertel Bruun, Herbert Spencer Zim. Birds of North America: A guide to field identification. St. Martin's Press, 2001. ISBN 1-58238-091-0.
- Rushforth, Keith, Charles Hollis. National Geographic field guide to the trees of North America. National Geographic, 2006. ISBN 0-7922-5310-8.
- Scharpf, Robert, U. S. Forest Service. Diseases of Pacific Coast conifers. Forest Service, U.S. Dept. of Agriculture, 1993. ISBN 0-16-041765-1.
- Sibley, David. The Sibley field guide to birds of eastern North America. Alfred A. Knopf, 2003. ISBN 0-679-45120-X.
- Sibley, David. The Sibley field guide to birds of western North America. Alfred A. Knopf, 2003. ISBN 0-679-45121-8.
- Sibley, David. The Sibley guide to birds. Alfred A. Knopf, 2000. ISBN 0-679-45122-6.
- Terres, John K. Audubon Society Encyclopedia of North American Birds. Knopf, 1991.
  - Wilson, Don E., Sue Ruff, American Society of Mammalogists. The Smithsonian book of North American mammals. Smithsonian Institution Press, 1999. ISBN 1-56098-845-2.

===== United States =====
- Arany, Lynne, Archie Hobson. Little museums: Over 1,000 small and not-so-small American showplaces. H. Holt, 1998. ISBN 0-8050-4823-5.
- Association of Collegiate Schools of Architecture. Guide to architecture schools. Association of Collegiate Schools of Architecture Press, 1998. ISSN 1097-2552.
- Babcock, Barbara A., Nancy J. Parezo. Daughters of the desert: Women anthropologists and the native American southwest, 1880–1980: An illustrated catalogue. University of New Mexico Press, 1988. ISBN 0-8263-1087-7.
- Becker, William H. The Encyclopedia of American Business History and Biography. Facts on File/Bruccoli Clark Layman, 1988–.
- The Britannica Encyclopedia of American Art. Encyclopædia Britannica Educational Corp., 1973.
- Browne, Ray Broadus, Pat Browne. The guide to United States popular culture. Bowling Green State University Popular Press, 2001. ISBN 0-87972-821-3.
- Butcher, Russell D., Stephen E. Adair, Lynn A. Greenwalt. America's national wildlife refuges: A complete guide. Roberts Rinehart Publishers in cooperation with Ducks Unlimited, 2003. ISBN 1-57098-379-8.
- Cuff, David J. and William J. Young. The United States Energy Atlas. 2nd ed., Macmillan, 1986.
- Davis, Richard C. Encyclopedia of American forest and conservation history. Macmillan; Collier Macmillan, 1983. ISBN 0-02-907350-2.
- Fairbanks, Jonathan and Elizabeth Bidwell Bates. American Furniture: 1620 to the Present. Marek, 1981.
- Fernett, Gene. American Film Studios: An Historical Encyclopedia. McFarland, 1988.
- Filipelli, Ronald L. Labor Conflict in the United States: An Encyclopedia. Garland, 1990.
- Goulart, Ron. The Encyclopedia of American Comics. Facts on File, 1990.
- Grassy, John, Theodore E. Roosevelt IV, National Audubon Society. Audubon guide to the national wildlife refuges: Colorado, Idaho, Montana, Utah, Wyoming. St. Martin's Griffin, 2000. ISBN 0-312-24574-2.
- Hitchcock, H. Wiley & Stanley Sadie. The New Grove Dictionary of American Music. Grove's Dictionaries of Music Inc, 1986.
- Hixson, Richard. Mass Media and the Constitution: An Encyclopedia of Supreme Court Cases. Garland, 1989.
- Hudson, Robert V. Mass Media: A Chronological Encyclopedia of Television, Radio, Motion Pictures, Magazines, Newspapers, and Books in the United States. Garland, 1987.
- Kurian, George Thomas. Encyclopedia of American studies. Grolier Educational, 2001. ISBN 0-7172-9222-3.
- Lester, Walter. American Shelter: An Illustrated Encyclopedia of the American Home. Overlook Press, 1981.
- Lissauer, Robert. Lissauer's Encyclopedia of Popular Music in America. Paragon House, 1981.
- Magill, Frank N. Magill's American Film Guide. Salem Press.
- Mariani, John F. The Dictionary of American Food and Drink. 2nd ed., Hearst, 1994.
- Olson, James S. and Susan Wladaver-Morgan. Dictionary of United States Economic History. Greenwood, 1992.
- Packard, Robert T. and Balthazar Korab. Encyclopedia of American Architecture. McGraw-Hill, 1994.
- Porter, Glenn. Encyclopedia of American Economic History: Studies of the Principal Movements and Ideas. Scribner's, 1980.
- Schapsmeier, Edward L. and Frederick H. Schapsmeier. Encyclopedia of American Agricultural History. Greenwood, 1975.
- Shavit, David. The United States in the Middle East: A historical dictionary. Greenwood Press, 1988. ISBN 0-313-25341-2.
- Slide, Anthony. The American Film Industry: A Historical Dictionary. Greenwood, 1986.

====== South America ======
- Twyman, Robert W. and David C. Roller. The Encyclopedia of Southern History. Louisiana State University Press, 1979.
- Wilson, Charles R and William Ferris. Encyclopedia of Southern Culture. University of North Carolina Press, 1989.

=== Asia ===
- Stanton, Andrea L. Cultural sociology of the Middle East, Asia, & Africa: an encyclopedia. Sage Publications, 2012. ISBN 978-1-4129-8176-7.

==== Middle East ====
- Shavit, David. The United States in the Middle East: A historical dictionary. Greenwood Press, 1988. ISBN 0-313-25341-2.
- Shoup, John A. Ethnic groups of Africa and the Middle East: an encyclopedia. ABC-CLIO, 2011. ISBN 978-1-59884-363-7 .

==== Southeast Asia ====
===== India =====
- Ghosh, A. An Encyclopedia of Indian Archaeology. Munshiram Manoharlal, 1989.
- Meister, Michael W., Madhusudan A. Dhaky American Institute of Indian Studies. Encyclopedia of Indian temple architecture. Philadelphia: American Institute of Indian Studies; University of Pennsylvania Press, 1983–. ISBN 0-8122-7840-2.
- Saletore, Rajaram N. Encyclopedia of Indian Culture. Sterling Publishers, 1983.

=== Europe ===
- Cole, Jeffrey E. Ethnic groups of Europe: an encyclopedia. ABC-CLIO, 2011. ISBN 978-1-59884-303-3. .

==== British Isles ====
- Stace, Clive A., Hilli Thompson. New flora of the British Isles. Cambridge University Press, 1997. ISBN 0-521-58935-5.

=== Oceania ===
- Oliver, Douglas L. Oceania: The native cultures of Australia and the Pacific islands. University of Hawaii Press, 1989. ISBN 0-8248-1019-8.

== Automotive ==
- Lane, Keith (2002). "Amber Gambler". Automotive A–Z: Lane's Complete Dictionary of Automotive Terms. Veloce Publishing. ISBN 978-1-903706-40-4.

== Books, publishing, and printing ==
- Ascarelli, Fernanda. La tipografia cinquecentina italiana. Sansoni antiquariato, 1953. (Italian)
- Ahsley, Perry J. American newspaper publishers, 1950–1990. Gale Research, 1993. ISBN 0-8103-5386-5.
- Casado, Juan Delgado. Diccionario de impresores españoles, siglos XV–XVII. Arco-Libros, 1996. ISBN 84-7635-198-4.
- Duff, E. Gordon. A century of the English book trade: Short notices of all printers, stationers, book-binders, and others connected with it from the issue of the first dated book in 1457 to the incorporation of the Company of stationers in 1557. Printed for the Bibliographical Society by Blades, East and Blades, 1905.
- Geldner, Ferdinand. Die deutschen Inkunabeldrucker. A. Hiersemann, 1968–1970.
- Halkasch, Hans-Jürgen. Biografisches Lexikon des Druck- und Verlagswesens. Beruf + Schule, 1993. ISBN 3-88013-526-6. (German).
- Houfe, Simon. The dictionary of 19th century British book illustrators and caricaturists. Antique Collectors' Club, 1996. ISBN 1-85149-193-7.
- McKerrow, R. B. Dictionary of printers and booksellers in England, Scotland and Ireland and of foreign printers of English books, 1557–1640. 1910.
- Mellot, Jean-Dominique, Elisabeth Quebal. Répertoire d'imprimeurs/libraires XVIe–XVIIIe siècle: État en 1995 (4000 notices). Bibliothèque nationale de France, 1997. ISBN 2-7177-2007-3.
- Menato, Marco, Ennio Sandal, Guiseppina Zappella. Dizionario dei tipografi e degli editori italiani. Editrice Bibliografica, 1997–. ISBN 88-7075-364-6.
- National Library of Scotland. Scottish book trade index. National Library of Scotland. Available online here.
- Nemec, Krešimir, Dunja Fališevac, Darko Novaković. Leksikon hrvatskih pisaca. Školska knj, 2000. ISBN 953-0-61107-2.
- Müller, Jean. Dictionnaire abrégé des imprimeurs-éditeurs français du seizième siècle. Verlag Librairie Heitz, 1970.
- Plomer, H. R. Dictionary of the printers who were at work in England, Scotland and Ireland, from 1641 to 1667. 1907.
- Plomer, H. R. Dictionary of the printers and booksellers who were at work in England, Scotland and Ireland from 1668 to 1725. 1922.
- Plomer, H. R., G. H. Bushnell, E. R. McClintock Dix. Dictionary of the printers and booksellers who were at work in England, Scotland and Ireland from 1726 to 1775. 1932.
- Préaud, Maxime. Dictionnaire des éditeurs d'estampes à Paris sous l'Ancien Régime. Promodis/Editions du Cercle de la librairie, 1987. ISBN 2-903181-60-8.
- Renouard, Philippe. Imprimeurs and librairies parisiens du XVIe siècle: Ouvrage publié d'après les manuscrits de Philippe Renouard par le Service des travaux historiques de la ville de Paris avec la concours de Bibliotheque nationale. [Bibliothèque Nationale], 1964–1991.
- Renouard, Philippe, Henri-Jean Martin, Dominique Renouard. Répertoire des imprimeurs parisiens: Libraires et fondeurs de caractères en exercice à Paris au XVIIe siècle. Libr. des arts et métiers-éditions, 1995. ISBN 2-85497-050-0.
- Reske, Christoph, Josef Benzing. Die Buchdrucker des 16. und 17. Jahrhunderts im deutschen Sprachgebiet: Auf der Grundlage des gleichnamigen Werkes von Josef Benzing. Harrassowitz, 2007. ISBN 978-3-447-05450-8.
- Rouzet, Anne, Micheline Colin-Boon. Dictionnaire des imprimeurs, libraires et éditeurs des XVe et XVIe siècles dans les limites géographiques de la Belgique actuelle. B. de Graaf, 1975. ISBN 90-6004-322-7.
- Sonnenschein, William Swan (1891). The Best Books (2nd ed.). London: Routledge.

== Dogs ==
- Alderton, David (2008). Encyclopedia of Dogs (Hardcover). Bath: Parragon Inc. p. 384. ISBN 978-1-4075-2438-2.
- Coile, D. Caroline (April 1, 2005). Encyclopedia of Dog Breeds: Profiles of More than 150 Breeds (2nd ed.). Barron's Educational Series, Incorporated. p. 368. ISBN 978-0-7641-5700-4.
- De Prisco, Andrew; Johnson, James B. (1993). Canine Lexicon. T. F. H. Publications. p. 886. ISBN 978-3-929545-60-9.
- De Vito, Dominique (2005). World Atlas of Dog Breeds (Print) (6th ed.). Neptune City, NJ Lanham, MD: TFH Publications, Inc. Distributed in the U.S. to the Bookstore and library trade by National Book Network. p. 960. ISBN 978-0-7938-0656-0.
- DK Publishing (2013). The Dog Encyclopedia (Hardcover) (1st ed.). DK Adult. p. 360. ISBN 978-1-4654-0844-0.
- Wilcox, Bonnie; Walkowicz, Chris (1995). Atlas of Dog Breeds of the World (Print) (5th ed.). Neptune City, NJ; Lanham, MD: TFH Publications, Inc. Distributed in the U.S. to the Bookstore and library trade by National Book Network. p. 912. ISBN 978-0-7938-1284-4.

== Education ==
- Alkin, Marvin C. Encyclopedia of Educational Research. 6th ed., Macmillan, 1992.
- Altbach, Philip. International Higher Education: An Encyclopedia. Garland, 1991.
- Association of Collegiate Schools of Architecture. Guide to architecture schools. Association of Collegiate Schools of Architecture Press, 1998. ISSN 1097-2552.
- Barrow, Robin and Geoffrey Milburn. A Critical Dictionary of Educational Concepts: An Appraisal of Selected Ideas and Issues in Educational Theory and Practice. 2nd ed., Teachers College Press, 1990.
- Chambliss, J. J. Philosophy of education: An encyclopedia. Garland Pub., 1996. ISBN 0-8153-1177-X.
- Clark, Burton R. and Guy Neave. Encyclopedia of Higher Education. Pergamon Press, 1992.
- Concise Encyclopedia of Special Education. Wiley, 1990.
- Encyclopedia of Education. Macmillan, 1971.
- Gatti, Richard and Daniel. New Encyclopedic Dictionary of School Law. Parker Publishing, 1983.
- Gordon, Peter, Richard Aldrich. Biographical dictionary of North American and European educationists. Woburn Press, 1997. ISBN 0-7130-0205-0.
- Gorton, Richard A. Encyclopedia of School Administration and Supervision. Oryx Press, 1988.
- Gutek, Gerald Lee. Historical and philosophical foundations of education: A biographical introduction. Merrill, 2001. ISBN 0-13-013141-5.
- Husen, Torsten and T. Neville Postlethwaite. The International Encyclopedia of Education.. 2nd ed, Pergamon Press, 1994.
- International Encyclopedia of Educational Technology. Pergamon Press, 1989.
- International Where+How. The international who's who in distance learning. International Where+How, 1998–. ISBN 3-925144-11-0.
- Jaeger, Hans. Kürschners deutscher Gelehrten-Kalender. K. G. Saur, 1925–.
- Kapel, David E. American Educators' Encyclopedia. Rev. ed., Greenwood, 1991.
- Kent, Allen. Encyclopedia of Library and Information Science. Marcel Dekker, 1968–1983.
- Knowles, Asa. International Encyclopedia of Higher Education. Jossey-Bass, 1977.
- Kurian, George Thomas. World Education Encyclopedia. Facts on File, 1988.
- Marquis Who's Who. Who's who in American education. Marquis Who's Who, 1988–.
- National Reference Institute. Who's who in American education. National Reference Institute, 1988–. ISSN 1046-7203.
- Ohles, John F. (1978). Biographical Dictionary of American Educators. Greenwood Publishing Group. ISBN 978-0-8371-9893-4.
- Ohles, Frederik; Ohles, Shirley M.; Ramsay, John G. (1997). Biographical Dictionary of Modern American Educators. Greenwood Publishing Group. ISBN 978-0-313-29133-3.
- Palmer, Joy, Liora Bresler, David Edward Cooper. Fifty major thinkers on education: From Confucius to Dewey. Routledge, 2003. ISBN 0-415-23125-6.
- Palmer, Joy, David Edward Cooper, Liora Bresler. Fifty modern thinkers on education: From Piaget to the present day. Routledge, 2001. ISBN 0-415-22408-X.
- Palmer, Joy, Liora Bresler, David Edward Cooper. Fifty major thinkers on education: From Confucius to Dewey. Routledge, 2003. ISBN 0-415-23125-6.
- Peltzman, Barbara R. Pioneers of early childhood education: A bio-bibliographical guide. Greenwood Press, 1998. ISBN 0-313-30404-1.
- Reynolds, Cecil R. and Lester Mann. Encyclopedia of Special Education: A Reference for the Education of the Handicapped and Other Exceptional Children and Adults. Wiley, 1987.
- Seller, Maxine. Women educators in the United States, 1820–1993: A bio-bibliographical sourcebook. Greenwood Press, 1994. ISBN 0-313-27937-3.
- Squire, Latty R. Encyclopedia of Learning and Memory. Macmillan, 1992.
- Unwin, Derick and Ray McAleese. The Encyclopedia of Educational Media Communications and Technology. 2nd ed., Greenwood, 1988.
- Wedgeworth, Robert. World Encyclopedia of Library and Information Services. 3rd ed., American Library Association, 1993.
- Wiegland, Wayne and Donald Davis. Encyclopedia of Library History. Garland, 1993.
- Williams, Leslie R. and Doris Pronin Fromberg. Encyclopedia of Early Childhood Education. Garland, 1992.
- Winch, Christopher, John Gingell. Philosophy of education: The key concepts. Routledge, 2008. ISBN 978-0-415-42892-7.

=== Religious education ===
- Cully, Iris V. & Kendig Brubaker. Harper's Encyclopedia of Religious Education. HarperCollins, 1990.

== Fashion and clothing ==
- Eicher, Joanne Bubolz. Encyclopedia of world dress and fashion. Oxford University Press/Berg Publ., 2010. ISBN 978-0-19-537733-0.

== General reference ==
- Britannica Global Reference Center. Encyclopædia Britannica, 2013. Available online here.
- Dalby, Andrew. South East Asia: A guide to reference material. Hans Zell Publishers, 1993. ISBN 1-873836-00-7.
- Infoplease.com. Information Please LLC, [1998– ]. Available online here.
- Kister, Kenneth F. Kister's best encyclopedias: A comparative guide to general and specialized encyclopedias. Oryx Press, 1994. ISBN 0-89774-744-5.
- Reference universe. Paratext, 2002– . Available online here.
- Walsh, S. Padraig. Anglo-American general encyclopedias AK: A historical bibliography, 1703–1967. Bowker, 1968.
- World book online reference center. World Book, 2005–b. Available online here.

=== Almanacs ===
- Thomas, Robert Bailey. Old Farmer's Almanac. Old Farmer's Almanac, 2014. ISBN 978-1-57198-603-0. Available online here.
- Whitaker, Joseph. Whitaker's almanack. A. & C. Black, 1869–. ISBN 0-7136-7659-0.
- The world almanac and book of facts. World Almanac Books, 1868–. ISBN 0-88687-995-7. ISSN 0084-1382.

=== Compendia ===
- Brahms, William H. Notable Last Facts: A Compendium of Endings, Conclusions, Terminations, and Final Events. Reference Desk Press, 2005. ISBN 978-0-9765325-0-7.
- Ghazanfar, Shaikh M. Islamic civilization: History, contributions, and influence: A compendium of literature. Scarecrow Press, 2006. ISBN 0-8108-5264-0.
- Guinness world records. Guinness World Records Ltd., 1956–. ISBN 1-904994-12-1. Some content available online here.
- Kane, Joseph Nathan, Steven Anzovin, Janet Podell. Famous first facts: A record of first happenings, discoveries, and inventions in American history. H. W. Wilson, 2006. ISBN 0-8242-1065-4.

=== Encyclopedias ===
- A First Dictionary of Cultural Literacy: What Our Children Need to Know. Hirsch, J. D., ed. (1989). Houghton Mifflin.
- Academic American Encyclopedia. Grolier Electronic Publishing. 1983.
- American Educator: A Comprehensive Encyclopedia to Meet the Needs of Home, School, and Library. United Educators. 1919–77.
- The American Family Encyclopedia: A Concise and Comprehensive Reference Work. Books, Inc. 1963.
- The American Peoples Encyclopedia: A Modern Reference Work. Excelsior Trading Corp. 1948–76.
- The American Spectrum Encyclopedia: The New Illustrated Home Reference Guide. American Booksellers Assn. and Spectrum Database Publishing B.V. 1991.
- Appleton's new practical cyclopedia. Appleton, 1910.
- The Barnes & Noble Encyclopedia: Based on the Cambridge Encyclopedia. Barnes & Noble, Inc. 1993.
- Barnes & Noble New American Encyclopedia. Grolier Inc. 1991–.
- Barron's Junior Fact Finder: An Illustrated Encyclopedia for Children. Barron's Educational Series. 1989.
- Barron's New Student's Concise Encyclopedia. Barron's Educational Series. 1988–.
- Basic Everyday Encyclopedia. Random House. 1954.
- The Book of Knowledge. New York: Grolier. 1912.
- Britannica Instant Research System. Encyclopædia Britannica. 1993.
- Britannica Junior Encyclopedia for Boys and Girls. Encyclopædia Britannica. 1934–84.
- Britannica Online. Encyclopædia Britannica. scheduled for 1994.
- Britannica online Japan (Buritanika onrain Japan (BOLJ)). Encyclopædia Britannica. Available online here Archived 2015-04-15 at the Wayback Machine. (Japanese).
- The Cadillac Modern Encyclopedia: The World of Knowledge in One Volume. Cadillac Publishing. 1973.
- The Cambridge Encyclopedia. Cambridge University Press. 1990–.
- Cambridge Paperback Encyclopedia. Cambridge University Press. 1993–.
- Century dictionary and Cyclopedia. Century, 1909.
- Chamber's Encyclopedia. Oxford and New York: Pergamon. 1923.
- Chambers's Encyclopedia. International Learning Systems. 1973.
- Charlie Brown's 'Cyclopedia. Funk & Wagnalls. 1980.
- Childcraft: The How and Why Library. World Book. 1934–.
- Children's Britannica. Encyclopædia Britannica. 1960–.
- The Children's Encyclopædia. A.S. Barnes. 1959.
- The Child's World. Standard Education Corp. 1974.
- Collier's Encyclopedia with Bibliography and Index, 1950.
- Collins Gem Encyclopedia. William Collins Sons & Company. 1979.
- The Columbia Electronic Encyclopedia. Franklin Electronic Publishers. 1991.
- The Columbia Encyclopedia. Columbia University Press. 1985.
- Compton's by Britannica. Encyclopædia Britannica, 1922–. ISBN 978-1-59339-298-7.
- Compton's Concise Encyclopedia. Compton's NewMedia. 1991.
- Compton's Encyclopedia. Compton's NewMedia. 1992.
- Compton's Encyclopedia & Fact-Index. Compton's Learning Company. 1968–.
- Compton's Family Encyclopedia. Compton's NewMedia. 1991.
- Compton's Interactive Encyclopedia. Compton's NewMedia. 1993.
- Compton's Multimedia Encyclopedia. Compton's NewMedia. 1989.
- Compton's Precyclopedia. Encyclopædia Britannica. 1973–.
- The Concise Columbia Encyclopedia. Columbia University Press. 1983.
- The Concise Columbia Encyclopedia. Columbia University Press. 1992.
- The Cultural Library. Parents Magazine Educational Press. 1965.
- The Dictionary of Cultural Literacy. Houghton Mifflin. 1988.
- Disney's Wonderful World of Knowledge. Danbury Press. 1973.
- Dunlop's Illustrated Encyclopedia of Facts. Doubleday. 1969
- Enciclopedia universal en Español. Encyclopædia Britannica, 2003–. (Spanish). Available online here.
- Encyclopædia Britannica (12th ed.). Chicago: Encyclopædia Britannica. 1922.
- Goetz, Philip W.; McHenry, Robert; Hoiberg, Dale, eds. (2010). Encyclopædia Britannica, 32 vols (15th ed.). Encyclopædia Britannica. ISBN 978-1-59339-292-5.. Subscription-based online access is available.
- Encyclopædia Britannica online. Encyclopædia Britannica, 2001–. Available online here.
- Encyclopaedia Universalis. Encyclopaedia Universalis, 2002–. Available online here. (French).
- Lieber, Francis (1831), Encyclopedia Americana
- Encyclopedia Americana. Chicago: Encyclopedia Americana. 1918–1920.
- Encyclopedia International. Lexicon Publications. 1963–82.
- Encyclopedia of World Knowledge. Encyclopedia of World Knowledge, Inc. 1969.
- Encyclopédie; ou Dictionnaire raisonné des sciences, des arts et des métiers. Diderot, Denis, Jean Le Rond d'Alembert, Pierre Mouchon, Briasson [etc.], 1751–1765.
- The Everyday Reference Library: An Encyclopedia of Useful Information. J.G. Ferguson. 1964.
- Girling, D. A. (1978). Everyman's Encyclopaedia. Dent. ISBN 978-0-460-04098-3.
- Everyman's Encyclopedia. J. M. Dent & Sons Ltd. 1985.
- Facts Plus: An Almanac of Essential Information. Instructional Resources Company. 1991–.
- Finding Out: Silver Burdett's Children's Encyclopedia. Silver Burdett, 1981.
- First Connections: The Golden Book Encyclopedia. Hartley Courseware. 1993.
- Funk & Wagnall's New Encyclopedia. Funk & Wagnalls. 1971–.
- Global International Encyclopedia. Grolier Inc. 1991–.
- The Golden Book Encyclopedia. Western Publishing. 1959–.
- The Great World Encyclopedia. Two Continents Publishing, 1976.
- Grolier Academic Encyclopedia. Grolier Inc. 1983–.
- The Grolier Children's Encyclopedia. Grolier Educational Corporation. 1993.
- Grolier Encyclopedia. Grolier Society, 1944–63.
- Grolier Encyclopedia of Knowledge. Grolier Inc. 1983–.
- Grolier Incorporated (1998). Academic American Encyclopedia. Grolier Inc. ISBN 978-0-7172-2068-7.
- Grolier Universal Encyclopedia. Grolier, 1965–1972.
- The Hamlyn Younger Children's Encyclopedia. Hamlyn Publishing, 1972.
- Harver Junior World Encyclopedia. Harver Educational, 1972.
- Harver World Encyclopedia: Alphabetical Encyclopedia in 20 Volumes. Harver Educational, 1973–75.
- Home University Encyclopedia: An Illustrated Treasury of Knowledge, with Special Plates and Articles and Departmental Supervision by 462 Leading Editors, Educators and Specialists in the United States and Europe. Books, Inc., 1941–61.
- Hutchinson Encyclopedia, Hutchinson, ed., (2007), Hodder & Stoughton, 1,062 pages. ISBN 0-340-88690-0.
- Hutchinson Encyclopedia of Ireland, Brady, Ciaran (2000), Oxford, Helicon, 384 pages. ISBN 978-1-85986-320-6.
- The Illustrated Encyclopedia of Learning in 12 Fact-Filled Accurate Volumes Illustrated with more than 6,000 Dramatic Full-Color Pictures. Comet Press, 1969.
- The Illustrated Libraries of Human Knowledge. Charles E. Merrill Publishing, 1968.
- Illustrated World Encyclopedia. Bobley Publishing, 1958–73.
- Information Finder. World Book. 1989.
- The Junior Encyclopedia of General Knowledge. Octopus Books Ltd., 1978.
- Junior Pears Encyclopedia. Pelham Books Ltd., 1961–.
- The Kingfisher Children's Encyclopedia. Kingfisher Books. 1992.
- Knowledge Encyclopedia. Arco Publishing. 1984.
- The Kussmaul Encyclopedia. Delphi Internet Services. 1983.
- The Ladies' Home Journal Children's Illustrated Encyclopedia for Learning. Ladies Home Journal and Comet Press, 1970.
- Larousse Illustrated International Encyclopedia and Dictionary. World Publishing, 1972.
- Lexicon Universal Encyclopedia. Lexicon Publications. 1982–.
- The Lincoln Library of Essential Information. Frontier Press, 1924–85.
- Little and Ives Illustrated Ready Reference Encyclopedia. Little and Ives, 1961.
- The Macmillan Family Encyclopedia. Grolier Inc. 1980–.
- The McKay One-Volume International Encyclopedia. McKay, 1970.
- Merit Students Encyclopedia. Macmillan Educational, 1967–91.
- Microsoft Encarta Multimedia Encyclopedia. Microsoft Corporation. 1993.
- Modern Century Illustrated Encyclopedia. Modern Century Illustrated Encyclopedia, Inc., 1972.
- My First Encyclopedia. Snow, Alan (1992). Troll Associates.
- My First Encyclopedia. Watson, Carol (1993). Dorling Kindersley.
- My First Encyclopedia A–Z. Silver Burdett, 1988.
- My First Golden Encyclopedia. Golden Press, 1969.
- National Encyclopedia. P.F. Collier, 1932–60.
- Ekman, Arne (2000). Nationalencyklopedin: ett uppslagsverk på vetenskaplig grund utarbetat på initiativ av Statens kulturråd (in Swedish). Bra Böcker. ISBN 978-91-7133-736-8.. A subscription-based online version is also available.
- Nelson's Encyclopedia for Young Readers. Thomas Nelson, 1980.
- Nelson's Perpetual Loose Leaf Encyclopedia: An International Work of Reference, Original (conventionally bound) edition: 1904; loose-leaf edition: 1907–1934.
- The New American Desk Encyclopedia. New American Library. 1984.
- The New American Encyclopedia: A Treasury of Information on the Sciences, the Arts, Literature, and General Knowledge. The Publishers Agency, 1973.
- The New Book of Knowledge. Grolier Inc. 1966–.
- The New Caxton Encyclopedia. Caxton Publications, 1979.
- New Century Book of Facts: A Handbook of Ready Reference. Continental Publishing, 1909–64.
- The New College Encyclopedia. Galahad Press, 1978.
- New Golden Encyclopedia. Golden Press, 1963.
- The New Grolier Multimedia Encyclopedia. Grolier Electronic Publishing. 1985.
- The New Grolier Student Encyclopedia. Grolier Educational Corporation. 1988–.
- New Human Interest Library. Books, Inc., 1928–68.
- The New Illustrated Columbia Encyclopedia. Rockville House, 1978–80.
- New Knowledge Library: Universal Reference Encyclopedia. Bay Books, 1981.
- New Standard Encyclopedia. Standard Educational Corporation. 1930–.
- The New Talking Cassette Encyclopedia. Troll Associates, 1984.
- The New Universal Family Encyclopedia. Random House, 1985.
- New Universal Standard Encyclopedia. Funk & Wagnalls, 1968.
- The New University One-Volume Encyclopedia. Grosset Dunlap, 1968.
- Our Wonderful World: An Encyclopedic Anthology for the Entire Family. Grolier, 1955–72.
- Oxford Children's Encyclopedia. Oxford University Press. 1991.
- Oxford Illustrated Encyclopedia. Oxford University Press. 1985–1993.
- Oxford Junior Encyclopedia. Oxford University Press, 1948–76.
- Pears Cyclopaedia: A Book of Background Information and Reference for Everyday Use. Pelham Books, 1897–.
- Penguin Encyclopedia. Penguin Books, 1966.
- Picture Encyclopedia for Children. Grosset & Dunlap, 1987.
- Pictured Knowledge: The Full-Color Illustrated Encyclopedia for the Family. Little and Ives, 1956–58.
- Pocket Encyclopedia. Random House, 1989.
- Purnell's First Encyclopedia in Colour. Purnell & Sons, 1974.
- Purnell's Pictorial Encyclopedia. Purnell & Sons, 1979.
- The Quick Reference Handbook: Basic Knowledge and Modern Technology. Varsity Company, 1987.
- Raintree Children's Encyclopedia. Raintree Publishers, 1988.
- Rand McNally Student Encyclopedia in Color. Rand McNally, 1972.
- Rand McNally's Children's Encyclopedia. Rand McNally, 1977.
- The Random House Children's Encyclopedia. Troll Associates. 1991.
- Random House Electronic Encyclopedia. SelecTronics. 1990.
- The Random House Encyclopedia. Random House. 1977.
- The Random House Encyclopedia: Electronic Edition. MicroLytics. 1990.
- The Random House Library of Knowledge: First Encyclopedia. Williams, Brian and Brenda (1992). Random House.
- Richards Topical Encyclopedia. Grolier, Inc., 1939–62.
- Routledge's every man's cyclopedia. Routledge; Dutton, 1910.
- Running Press Cyclopedia: The Portable, Visual Encyclopedia. Running Press. 1993.
- The Software Toolworks Illustrated Encyclopedia. Grolier Electronic Publishing. 1990.
- Troll Student Encyclopedia., Dempsey, Michael and Keith Lye (1991), Troll Associates.
- Unified Encyclopedia: A Modern Reference Library of Unified Knowledge for the Parent, Student and Young Reader. Unified Encyclopedia Press, 1960–64.
- The Universal World Reference Encyclopedia. Consolidated Book Publishers, 1945–70.
- The Usborne Children's Encyclopedia. Elliott, Jane (1987). EDC Publishing.
- The Volume Library: A Modern, Authoritative Reference for Home and School Use. The Southwestern Company. 1911–962, 1970.
- Webster's Beginning Book of Facts., Dennis, John (1978), Merriam-Webster.
- Webster's Family Encyclopedia. Ottenheimer Publishers. 1989–.
- Webster's New World Encyclopedia. Prentice Hall. 1992.
- Webster's New World Encyclopedia College Edition. Prentice Hall. 1993.
- Webster's New World Encyclopedia: Pocket Edition. Prentice Hall. 1993.
- Wikipedia: The free encyclopedia. Wikimedia Foundation, 2001–. Available online here.
- Wonderland of Knowledge. Publishers Publications, 1937–73.
- The World Almanac Infopedia: A Visual Encyclopedia for Students. World Almanac. 1990.
- The World Book Encyclopedia. World Book, Inc. 1917–.
- World Wide Encyclopedia. Books, Inc., 1967.
- The Young Children's Encyclopedia. Encyclopædia Britannica. 1970–.
- Young People's Illustrated Encyclopedia. Children's Press, 1972.
- Young Students Learning Library. Weekly Reader Books. 1988–.
- Young World: A Child's First Encyclopedia. Random House, 1992.

==== Encyclopedias by country/region ====
===== Albania =====
- Hoxha, Abaz (1999). Enciklopedi E Kinematografise Shqiptare (in Albanian). Seksioni i Akademisë Shqiptaro-Amerikane të Shkencave dhe Arteve. ISBN 978-99927-643-0-5.
- Meçaj, Nasip; Çelaj, Xhemil; Toçi, Fatmir (2009). Enciklopedi e Kurveleshit (in Albanian). Botimet Toena. ISBN 978-99943-1-496-6.
- Pango, Apostol (2002). Enciklopedia e Delvinës dhe e Sarandës (in Albanian). Botimet Toena. ISBN 978-99927-1-597-0.
- Plaku, Zylyftar (2009). Berati enciklopedi (in Albanian). SHB "Jonalda". ISBN 978-99943-751-8-9.
- Tole, Vasil S. (2001). Folklori muzikor: Enciklopedia e muzikës popullore shqiptare (in Albanian). Shtëpia Botuese e Librit Universitar.
- Fjalor enciklopedik shqiptar (in Albanian). Akademia e Shkencave e RPSSH. 1985.

===== Arab world =====
- Ameri, Anan; Ramey, Dawn; Services, Arab Community Center for Economic and Social (2000). Arab American encyclopedia. U X L. ISBN 978-0-7876-2952-6.
- Armes, Roy (2010). Arab Filmmakers of the Middle East: A Dictionary. Indiana University Press. ISBN 978-0-253-35518-8.
- Delgado, Jorge Lirola; Vílchez, José Miguel Puerta; Árabes, Fundación Ibn Tufayl de Estudios (2009). Biblioteca de al-Andalus (in Spanish). Fundación Ibn Tufayl de Estudios Árabes. ISBN 978-84-934026-6-2.
- Hillauer, Rebecca (2005). Encyclopedia Of Arab Women Filmmakers. American Univ in Cairo Press. p. 4. ISBN 978-977-424-943-3.
- Khallikān, Ibn (1871). Ibn Khallikan's biographical dictionary. Printed for the Oriental translation fund of Great Britain and Ireland.
- Marzolph, Ulrich; Leeuwen, Richard Van; Wassouf, Hassan (2004). The Arabian Nights Encyclopedia. ABC-CLIO. ISBN 978-1-57607-204-2.
- Mattar, Philip (2005). Encyclopedia of the Palestinians. Infobase Publishing. ISBN 978-0-8160-6986-6.
- Oweis, Fayeq (2008). Encyclopedia of Arab American Artists. ABC-CLIO. ISBN 978-0-313-33730-7.
- Rāshid, Rushdī; Morelon, Régis (1996). Encyclopedia of the History of Arabic Science. Routledge. ISBN 978-0-415-12410-2.
- Reich, Bernard (1996). An Historical Encyclopedia of the Arab-Israeli Conflict. Greenwood Press. ISBN 978-0-313-27374-2.
- Tucker, Spencer C.; Roberts, Priscilla Mary (2008). The Encyclopedia of the Arab-Israeli Conflict: A Political, Social, and Military History: A Political, Social, and Military History. ABC-CLIO. ISBN 978-1-85109-842-2.
- Versteegh, Kees (2008). Encyclopedia of Arabic language and linguistics. Brill. ISBN 978-90-04-14476-7.

===== Armenia =====
- Soviet Armenian Encyclopedia (1974–87)
- Armenian Concise Encyclopedia (1990–2003)

===== Australia =====
- Horton, David; Australian Institute of Aboriginal and Torres Strait Islander Studies (1994). The Encyclopaedia of Aboriginal Australia: Aboriginal and Torres Strait Islander history, society and culture. Aboriginal Studies Press for the Australian Institute of Aboriginal and Torres Strait Islander Studies. ISBN 978-0-85575-250-7.

===== Bangladesh =====
- Banglapedia, the National Encyclopedia of Bangladesh.

===== Benin =====
- Houngnikpo, Mathurin C.; Decalo, Samuel (2013). Historical Dictionary of Benin. Rowman & Littlefield. ISBN 978-0-8108-7171-7.

===== Brazil =====
- Jackson, W. M., ed. (1919). Encyclopedia e diccionario internacional (in Portuguese). Rio de Janeiro: Lisboa.

===== Canada =====
- "De Smet Range". Bivouac Mountain Encyclopedia. Bivouac.com.

===== Cape Verde =====
- Lobban, Richard Andrew; Lobban, Richard; Saucier, Paul Khalil (2007). Historical dictionary of the Republic of Cape Verde. Scarecrow Press. ISBN 978-0-8108-4906-8.

===== Chad =====
- Decalo, Samuel (1997). Historical dictionary of Chad. Scarecrow Press. ISBN 978-0-8108-3253-4.

===== China =====
- The Chinese-Language Concise Encyclopædia Britannica or Bu lie dian xiu zhen bai ke. (in Chinese). Encyclopædia Britannica & Taiwan Chung Hwa Book Publishing, 1988. Available online here.
- The New Encyclopædia Britannica in 32 Volumes. Encyclopædia Britannica, Inc., 1974–.

===== Czech Republic =====
- Ottův slovník naučny (in Czech). V Praze: Otto. 1888–1909.

===== Denmark =====
- Bang, J., ed. (1977). Gyldendals tibinds leksikon 1–10 + supplement (in Danish). Gyldendal. ISBN 978-87-00-55391-0.
- Gyldendal (to present), Den Store Danske Encyklopædi, a general purpose encyclopedia based on Gyldendals tibinds leksikon freely accessible online. (in Danish)
- Hagerups Illustrerede Konversations Leksikon (in Danish) (1st ed.). Copenhagen: Hagerup. 1892–1900.
- Hartmann, Sys (2000). Weilbach – Dansk Kunstnerleksikon (in Danish). Munksgaard. ISBN 978-87-16-11206-4.. The work contains the biographies of some 8,000 Danish artists and architects. A freely accessible online version is available.
- Jensen, Jensen, Hansson, Finn, Langergaard, Luise Li, Busch, Busch (editorial committee) (1998 to present): Leksikon for det 21. århundrede (Encyclopedia for the 21st century). Freely accessible online. Based on the socialist Pax Leksikon from Norway but now expanded to over 3,200 articles. (in Danish)
- Langer, Torben W. (1969). Lademanns leksikon. 22 vols (in Danish). Lademann. ISBN 978-87-15-06000-7.
- Salmonsens Koversationsleksikon (in Danish) (1st ed.). V Praze: Otto. 1893–1911.

===== Djibouti =====
- Alwan, Daoud Aboubaker; Mibrathu, Yohanis (2000). Historical Dictionary of Djibouti. Scarecrow Press. ISBN 978-0-8108-3873-4.

===== Ecuador =====
- Enciclopedia del Ecuador, freely accessible online (in Spanish)

===== Eritrea =====
- Connell, Dan; Killion, Tom (2010). Historical Dictionary of Eritrea. Scarecrow Press. ISBN 978-0-8108-7505-0.
- Prouty, Chris; Rosenfeld, Eugene (1994). Historical Dictionary of Ethiopia and Eritrea. Scarecrow Press. ISBN 978-0-8108-2663-2.

===== Estonia =====
- Estonian Institute (2000 to present): Estonica, freely accessible online encyclopedia about Estonia.

===== France =====
- Marchand, Pierre; De Farcy, Élisabeth, eds. (1986). Découvertes Gallimard [Gallimard Discoveries] (in French). Paris: Éditions Gallimard. OCLC 638040265.
- Dictionnaire Encyclopédique Larousse (in French). Larousse, 1993.
- Diderot, Denis; et al., eds. (1751–1765). The ARTFL Encyclopédie (in French). Paris: Briasson, etc.
- Encyclopédie de L'Univers en Couleurs (in French). Larousse, 1989.
- Encyclopedia Universalis (in French). Encyclopedia Universalis France, 1990.
- Grand Dictionnaire Encyclopédique Larousse. Larousse, 1982–89.
- La grande encyclopedie (in French). Paris: Lamirault. 1886–1902.
- La Grande Encyclopédie (in French). Larousse, 1971–90.
- Grand Larousse Junior (in French). Larousse, 1992.
- Grand Larousse Universel en 15 Volumes (in French). Larousse, 1988.
- Larousse, Pierre, ed. (1865–1890). Grand dictionnaire universel du XIXe siecle ... (in French). Paris: Larousse.
- Larousse des Jeunes Encyclopédie (in French). Larousse, 1991.
- La Petit Larousse Illustré (in French). Larousse, 1993.
- Théma Encyclopédie Larousse (in French). Larousse, 1990–91.

===== Germany =====
- Das Bertelsmann Lexikon: Die Grosse Bertelsmann Lexikothek (in German). Bertelsmann Lexikon-Verlag, 1984–85.
- Der Brockhaus in fünfzehn Bänden. F. A. Brockhaus, 2002–. Available online here.
- Ersch, J. S. and J. G. Gruber, ed. (1818–1889). Allegemeine Encclopadie der Wissenschaften und Kunste (in German). Leipzig: Brockhaus.
- Der Grosse Brockhaus (in German) (13th ed.). Aufl. Wiesbaden: Brokhaus. 1928.
- Der Grosse Herder (in German) (1st ed.). Freiburg: Herder. 1854–1857.
- Grosses vollstandiges Universal=Lexicon (in German). Halle: J. H. Zedler. 1732–1750.
- Meyers Enzyklopädisches Lexikon (in German). Bibliographisches Institut Lexikonverlag, 1973–81.
- Meyers Konversations-Lexikon (in German). Leipzig, Mannheim: Var. 1840–55.
- Der Neue Herder (in German). Herder, 1973–75.

===== Guinea =====
- O'Toole, Thomas; Baker, Janice E. (2005). Historical Dictionary of Guinea. Scarecrow Press. ISBN 978-0-8108-6545-7.

===== Guinea-Bissau =====
- Lobban, Richard; Mendy, Peter Karibe Michael; Mendy, Peter Michael Karibe (1997). Historical dictionary of the Republic of Guinea-Bissau. Scarecrow Press. ISBN 978-0-8108-3226-8.

===== Hungary =====
- Élesztős, László, Sándor Rostás, Éva Barabás. Magyar nagylexikon. Akadémiai Kiadó; Magyar Nagylexikon Kiadó, 1993–2004. ISBN 963-05-6611-7. (Hungarian)
- Révai nagy lexikona (in Hungarian). Budapest: Révai Testvérek Irodalmi Intézet Részvénytársaság. 1911–1935.

===== Iceland =====
- Halfdanarson, Gudmundur (2008). Historical Dictionary of Iceland. Scarecrow Press. ISBN 978-0-8108-6274-6.

===== Italy =====
- Enciclopedia del Novecento (in Italian). Istituto della Enciclopedia Italiana, 1975–89.
- Enciclopedia Einaudi (in Italian). G. Einaudi, 1977–84.
- Enciclopedia Europea (in Italian). Garzanti, 1976–84.
- Enciclopedia Italiana di Scienze, Lettere ed Arti (in Italian). Istituto della Enciclopedia Italiana, 1929–.
- Grande Dizionario Enciclopedico UTET (in Italian). Unione Tipografico-Editrice Torinese, 1966–79.

===== Japan =====
- Britannica International Encyclopaedia (in Japanese). TBS-Britannica Company, 1975.
- Dai-Nihon Hyakka Jiten (in Japanese). Shôgakukan, 1972–73.
- Daijiten Desuku (in Japanese). Kodansha, 1983.
- Heibonsha Dai-Hyakka Jiten (in Japanese). Heibonsha, 1984–85.
- JapanKnowledge+ (JapanKnowledge purasu): Chishiki tansaku saito. Net Advance. Available online here.
- Kaito, Shuichi, Heibonsha. Sekai daihyakka jiten: Heibonsha's world encyclopedia. Heibonsha, 2007–2009. ISBN 978-4-582-03400-4 (set). (Japanese).
- Netto de Hyakka for Library. Heinbonsha. Available online here.
- Yahoo!Hyakka jiten. Yahoo!Japan. Available online here.

===== Kazakhstan =====
- Burkitbai, Ayaghan (2007). Kazakhstan: encyclopedic reference book. Kazakh Encyclopedia, Ministry of Culture and Information. ISBN 978-9965-893-00-1.
- Kassymova, Didar; Kundakbayeva, Zhanat; Markus, Ustina (2012). Historical Dictionary of Kazakhstan. Scarecrow Press. ISBN 978-0-8108-7983-6.

===== Korea =====
- Great Korean Encyclopedia (in Korean).
- Kwangmyong Encyclopedia (in Korean).
- The Britannica World Encyclopedia (in Korean). Korea Britannica Corporation, 1992–.

===== Mexico =====
- Álvarez, José Rogelio (2005). Enciclopedia de México: Campeche-Cordoba. Enciclopedia de México. ISBN 9781564090744.

===== Netherlands =====
- Grote Nederlandse Larousse Encyclopedie (in Dutch). Heideland-Oris, 1972–80.
- Grote Spectrum Encyclopedie (in Dutch). Het Spectrum, 1974–79.
- Grote Winkler Prins Encyclopedie (in Dutch). Elsevier, 1985–93.
- Spectrum Compact Encyclopedie (in Dutch). Het Spectrum.

===== Nepal =====
- Acharya, Madhu Raman (1986). Nepal concise encyclopedia: a comprehensive dictionary of facts and knowledge about the kingdom of Nepal ... Geeta Sharma.

===== Niger =====
- Idrissa, Abdourahmane; Decalo, Samuel (2012). Historical Dictionary of Niger. Scarecrow Press. ISBN 978-0-8108-7090-1.

===== Poland =====
- Benedykt Chmielowski, ed. (1745–1746). Nowe Ateny Albo Akademiia Wszelkiej Sciencyi Pełna, Na Różne Tytuły Jak Na Classes Podzielona, Mądrym Dla Memoryjału, Idiotom Dla Nauki, Politykom Dla Praktyki, Melankolikom Dla Rozrywki Erygowana (in Polish). Lviv (Lwów).
- Ignacy Krasicki, ed. (1781). Zbiór potrzebniejszych wiadomości (in Polish). Warsaw: Michael Gröll.
- Samuel Orgelbrand, ed. (1859–1868). S.Orgelbranda Encyklopedia Powszechna (1859) (in Polish). Vol. 28 vols. Warsaw: Orgelbrand.
- Hipolit and Mieczysław Orgelbrand (Samuel Orgelbrand), ed. (1872–1876). S.Orgelbranda Encyklopedia Powszechna (1872) (in Polish). Vol. 12 vols. Warsaw: Orgelbrand.
- Encyklopedia ogólna wiedzy ludzkiej (in Polish). Vol. 12 vols. Warsaw. 1872–1877.
- Hipolit and Mieczysław Orgelbrand (Samuel Orgelbrand), ed. (1898–1912). Orgelbranda Encyklopedia powszechna z ilustracjami i mapami (1898) (in Polish). Vol. 16 + 2 vols. Warsaw: Orgelbrand.
- Encyklopedia Powszechna Kieszonkowa (in Polish). Warsaw: Nakład druk i własność Noskowskiego. 1888.
- Zygmund Gloger, ed. (1900–1903). Encyklopedia staropolska ilustrowana (in Polish). Vol. 4 vols. Warsaw: P. Laskauer i W. Babicki.
- Saturnin Sikorski, ed. (1890–1914). Wielka encyklopedia powszechna ilustrowana (in Polish). Vol. 55 vols. Warsaw: Saturnin Sikorski.
- Encyklopedia podręczna ilustrowana według 2 najnowszego wydania "Macierzy Polskiej" we Lwowie, uzupełniona i opracowana do użytku naszych czytelników (in Polish). Vol. 4 vols. Warsaw. 1906.
- Encyklopedia popularna ilustrowana treść wszystkich gałęzi wiedzy ludzkiej, podana przystępnie (in Polish). Vol. 4 vols. Warsaw. 1909–1912.
- Trzaska, Evert I Michalski, ed. (1925–1938). Ilustrowana encyklopedia (in Polish). Vol. 6 vols.
- Encyklopedia Powszechna Ultima Thule (in Polish). Vol. 10 vols. Warsaw. 1927–1939.
- Wielka ilustrowana encyklopedia powszechna (in Polish). Vol. 20 vols. Cracow (Krakow): Gutenberg, Helge Fergo. 1929–1938.
- Wielka encyklopedia powszechna PWN (in Polish). Vol. 12 + 1 vols. Warsaw: PWN. 1962–1969.
- Encyklopedia powszechna PWN (in Polish). Vol. 4 + 1 vols. Warsaw: PWN. 1973–1976.
- Britannica (in Polish). Vol. 49 vols (Encyclopædia Britannica – polish ed.). Warsaw: Kurpisz S.A. 1997–2005.
- Wielka encyklopedia PWN (in Polish). Vol. 31 vols. Warsaw: PWN. 2001–2005.
- Encyklopedia białych plam (in Polish). Vol. 20 vols. Warsaw: Polskie Wydawnictwo Encyklopedyczne. 2000–2006.
- Nowa encyclopedia powszechna PWN (in Polish). Vol. 8 vols. Warsaw: PWN. 2004.
- Popularna encyklopedia powszechna (in Polish). Vol. 20 + 1 vols. Fogra. 1994–1998.
- Encyklopedia powszechna PWN (2009) (in Polish). Vol. 30 vols. Warsaw: PWN. 2009–2010.
- Wielka encyklopedia Oxford (in Polish). Vol. 20 vols. Warsaw: Wydawnictwo Polskie Media Amer.Com, E.M. Studio. 2008.
- Encyklopedia nowej generacji E2.0 (in Polish). Warsaw: PWN. 2008.

===== Russia/Soviet Union =====
- Bol'shaia Sovetskaia Entsiklopediia (in Russian). Sovetskaia Entsiklopediia, 1976–78.
- Novyi entsiklopedischeskii slovar' (in Russian). Leipzig: Izdateli F. A. Brokgaus. 1912–1917.
- Prokhorov, A. M. Great Soviet encyclopedia. Macmillan, [1973–1983].
- Yandex slovari. Yandex. Available online here. (Russian).

===== Spain =====
- Aula: Enciclopédia del Estudiante (in Spanish). Editorial Planeta, 1988.
- Diccionario Enciclopédico: Enseñanza General Básica (in Spanish). Encyclopædia Britannica, 1988.
- Diccionario Enciclopédico Espasa (in Spanish). Espasa-Calpe, 1985.
- Diccionario Enciclopédico Larousse (in Spanish). Editorial Planeta, 1990.
- Diccionario Enciclopédico Salvat (in Spanish). Editorial Salvat, 1906–20.
- Enciclopedia de los Niños (in Spanish). Editorial Everest, 1990.
- Enciclopedia de Oro (in Spanish). Novaro, 1984.
- Enciclopedia General Planeta (in Spanish). Editorial Planeta, 1992.
- Enciclopedia Hispánica (in Spanish). Encyclopædia Britannica, 1992–93.
- Enciclopédia Ilustrada Cumbre (in Spanish). Promotora Editorial, 1991.
- Enciclopedia Juvenil Ilustrada (in Spanish). Editorial Planeta, 1991.
- Enciclopedia Universal Ilustrada Europeo-Americana (in Spanish). Espasa-Calpe, 1907–33.
- Enciclopedia Universal Sopena (in Spanish). Editorial Ramon Sopena, 1982.
- Gran Enciclopedia Larousse (in Spanish). Editorial Planeta, 1992.
- Gran Enciclopedia Rialp: GER (in Spanish). Ediciones Rialp, 1989–1991.
- Imago: Enciclopedia Temática (in Spanish). Santillana, 1992.
- Mis Primeros Conocimientos (in Spanish). Grolier, 1989.

===== Sudan =====
- Lobban, Richard (2004). Historical Dictionary of Ancient and Medieval Nubia. Scarecrow Press. ISBN 978-0-8108-4784-2.
- Lobban, Richard; Kramer, Robert S.; Fluehr-Lobban, Carolyn (2002). Historical dictionary of the Sudan. Scarecrow Press. ISBN 978-0-8108-4100-0.

===== Togo =====
- Samuel Decalo (1996). Historical Dictionary of Togo: 3rd Ed. Scarecrow Press. ISBN 978-0-8108-3073-8.

===== United States =====
- Bakken, Gordon Moris; Farrington, Brenda (2003). Encyclopedia of Women in the American West. Sage Publications. ISBN 978-0-7619-2356-5.
- Detweiler, Justice Brown, Who's Who in California : a Biographical Directory, 1928–29

==== Encyclopedias by topic ====
===== Religion =====
- Johnston, William M. Recent reference books in religion: A guide for students, scholars, researchers, buyers and readers. InterVarsity Press, 1996. ISBN 0-8308-1440-X.

== Genealogy ==
- Carraffa, Alberto García, Arturo García Carraffa. Enciclopedia heráldica y genealógica hispano-americana. Impr. de A. Marzo, 1919–1963.
- Encyclopedia of genealogy. Eastman's Online Genealogy Newsletter, [2006]–. Available here.
- Evans, Barbara Jean. A to zax: a comprehensive dictionary for genealogists & historians. Hearthside Press, 1995. ISBN 0-945231-02-4.
- FitzHugh, Terrick V.H., Susan Lumas. The dictionary of genealogy. A and C Black, 1998. ISBN 0-7136-4859-7.
- Gates, Henry Louis Jr. Faces of America: how 12 extraordinary people discovered their pasts. New York University Press, 2010. ISBN 978-0-8147-3264-9.
- Grant, Neil. Scottish clans and tartans. Lyons Press, 2000. ISBN 1-58574-094-2.
- Hey, David. The Oxford companion to local and family history. Oxford University Press, 2002. ISBN 0-19-860667-2.
- Hinshaw, William Wade, Thomas Worth Marshall. Encyclopedia of American Quaker genealogy. Genealogical Pub., 1991. ISBN 0-8063-0178-3.
- Kurzweil, Arthur, Miriam Weiner. The Encyclopedia of Jewish genealogy. J. Aronson, 1991–. ISBN 0-87668-835-0.
- Mogrobejo, Endika, Alberto García Carraffa. Diccionario hispanoamericano de heráldica, onomástica y genealogía. Editorial Mogrobejo-Zabala, [1995]–<[2001]>.
- Richardson, John, Brian Christmas. The local historian's encyclopedia. Historical Publications, 2003. ISBN 0-948667-83-4.
- Riemer, Shirley J., Roger P. Minert, Jennifer A. Anderson. The German research companion. Lorelei Press, 2010. ISBN 978-0-9656761-6-8.
- Schaefer, Christina K. Genealogical encyclopedia of the colonial Americas: A complete digest of the records of all the countries of the Western Hemisphere. Genealogical, 1998. ISBN 0-8063-1576-8.
- Smith, Clifford Neal, Anna Piszczan-Czaja Smith. Encyclopedia of German-American genealogical research. Genealogical, 2003. ISBN 0-8063-1742-6.
- Spreti, Vittorio. Enciclopedia storico-nobiliare italiana. Ed. Enciclopedia storico-nobiliare italiana, 1928–1936.

=== Names ===
- Jones, George F. German-American names. Genealogical, 2006. ISBN 0-8063-1764-7.
- Madubuike, Ihechukwu. A handbook of African names. Three Continents Press, 1994. ISBN 0-89410-437-3.
- Musere, Jonathan. Traditional African names. Scarecrow Press, 2000. ISBN 0-8108-3643-2.
- Ó Corráin, Donnchadh, Fidelma Maguire. Irish names. Lilliput Press, 1990. ISBN 0-946640-66-1.
- Urdang, Laurence, Walter C. Kidney, George C. Kohn. Twentieth century American nicknames. H. W. Wilson, 1979. ISBN 0-8242-0642-8.

==== Family names ====
- Bahlow, Hans. Dictionary of German names. University of Wisconsin Press, 2002. ISBN 0-924119-36-5.
- Bardsley, Charles Wareing Endell. A dictionary of English and Welsh surnames: With special American instances. Genealogical, 1996; 1901. ISBN 0-8063-0022-1.
- Beider, Alexander. A dictionary of Jewish surnames from Galicia. Avotaynu, 2004. ISBN 1-886223-19-X.
- Beider, Alexander. A dictionary of Jewish surnames from the Kingdom of Poland. Avotaynu, 1996. ISBN 0-9626373-9-4.
- Beider, Alexander. A dictionary of Jewish surnames from the Russian Empire. Avotaynu, 1993. ISBN 0-9626373-3-5.
- Bell, Robert. The book of Scots-Irish family names. Blackstaff, 1998. ISBN 0-85640-602-3.
- Benson, Morton. Dictionary of Russian personal names: With a revised guide to stress and morphology. Cambridge University Press, 1992. ISBN 0-521-41165-3.
- Black, George Fraser. The surnames of Scotland. Birlinn Limited, 1996. ISBN 1-874744-83-1.
- Chao, Sheau-yueh J. In search of your Asian roots: Genealogical research on Chinese surnames Xun gen su yuan: Zhoungguo ren de xing shi. Printed for Clearfield Co. by Genealogical Publ. Co, 2000. ISBN 0-8063-4946-8.
- Dauzat, Albert, Marie-Thérèse Morlet. Dictionnaire étymologique des noms de famille et prénoms de France. Larousse, 1987. ISBN 978-2-03-340309-6.
- Fordant, Laurent. Tous les noms de famille de France et leur localisation en 1900. Archives & Culture, 1999. ISBN 2-911665-30-9.
- Fucilla, Joseph G. Our Italian surnames. Genealogical Publ. Co., 2003, 1949. ISBN 978-0-8063-1187-6.
- Guggenheimer, Heinrich W., Eva H. Guggenheimer. Etymologisches Lexikon der jüdischen Familiennamen. K. G. Saur, 1996. ISBN 3-598-11260-2.
- Hanks, Patricia. Dictionary of American family names. Oxford University Press, 2003. ISBN 0-19-508137-4.
- Hanks, Patrick, Flavia Hodges, David L. Gold. A dictionary of surnames. Oxford University Press, 1988. ISBN 0-19-211592-8.
- Herbillon, Jules, Jean Germain, F. Debrabandere. Dictionnaire des noms de famille en Belgique romane: Et dans les régions limitrophes (Flandres, France du Nord, Luxembourg). Crédit communal, 1996. ISBN 2-87193-228-X.
- Herz, Laurent. Dictionnaire étymologique de noms de famille français d'origine étrangère et régionale: avec l'étymologie de quelques noms étrangers célèbres. L'Harmattan, 2010. ISBN 978-2-296-11753-2.
- Kaganoff, Benzion C. A dictionary of Jewish names and their history. J. Aronson, 1996. ISBN 1-56821-953-9.
- MacLysaght, Edward. The surnames of Ireland. Irish Academic Press, 1999. ISBN 0-7165-2366-3.
- Martine, Roderick, Don Pottinger, Sir Malcolm Innes of Edingight. Scottish clan and family names: their arms, origins, and tartans. Mainstream Publ., 2008. ISBN 1-85158-418-8.
- Meir, Emil. Swiss surnames: A complete register. Picton Press, 1995. ISBN 0-89725-206-3.
- Morlet, Marie-Thérèse. Dictionnaire étymologique des noms de famille. Perrin, 1997. ISBN 2-262-01350-0.
- Navajas, Julio de Atienza y. Nobiliario español: diccionario heráldico de apellidos españoles y de títulos nobiliarios. Aguilar, 1959.
- Platt, Lyman D. Hispanic surnames and family history. Genealogical Publ. Co., 1996. ISBN 0-8063-1480-X.
- Reaney, Percy H., R. M. Wilson. A dictionary of British surnames. Routledge and Kegan Paul, 1976. ISBN 0-7100-8106-5.
- Reaney, Percy H., R. M. Wilson. A dictionary of English surnames. Oxford University Press, 1997. ISBN 0-19-860092-5.
- Robb, H. Amanda, Andrew Chesler. Encyclopedia of American family names. HarperCollins, 1995. ISBN 0-06-270075-8.
- Smith, Elsdon Coles. New dictionary of American family names. Gramercy Publishing, 1988. ISBN 0-517-66954-4.
- Unbegaun, Boris Ottokar. Russian surnames. Clarendon Press, 1972. ISBN 0-19-815635-9.
- Way, George, Romilly Squire. Collins Scottish clan and family encyclopedia. HarperCollins, 1998. ISBN 0-00-472223-X.
- Whyte, Donald. Scottish surnames. Birlinn, 2000. ISBN 1-84158-056-2.
- Woods, Richard Donovan, Grace Alvarez-Altman. Spanish surnames in the southwestern United States: A dictionary. G. K. Hall, 1978. ISBN 0-8161-8145-4.

==== Given names ====
- Beider, Alexander. A dictionary of Ashkenazic given names: Their origins, structure, pronunciation, and migrations. Avotaynu, 2001. ISBN 1-886223-12-2.
- Benson, Morton. Dictionary of Russian personal names: With a revised guide to stress and morphology. Cambridge University Press, 1992. ISBN 0-521-41165-3.
- Dauzat, Albert, Marie-Thérèse Morlet. Dictionnaire étymologique des noms de famille et prénoms de France. Larousse, 1987. ISBN 978-2-03-340309-6.
- Hanks, Patrick, Flavia Hodges. A concise dictionary of first names. Oxford University Press, 2001. ISBN 0-19-866259-9.
- Hanks, Patrick, Flavia Hodges. A dictionary of first names. Oxford University Press, 2003. ISBN 0-19-860764-4.
- Kaganoff, Benzion C. A dictionary of Jewish names and their history. J. Aronson, 1996. ISBN 1-56821-953-9.
- Kolatch, Alfred J. The comprehensive dictionary of English and Hebrew first names. Jonathan David Publishers, 2004. ISBN 0-8246-0455-5.
- Room, Adrian. Dictionary of first names. Cassell, 2002. ISBN 0-304-36226-3.
- Withycombe, Elizabeth Gidley. The Oxford dictionary of English Christian names. Clarendon, 1977. ISBN 0-19-869124-6.
- Woods, Richard Donovan. Hispanic first names: A comprehensive dictionary of 250 years of Mexican-American usage. Greenwood Press, 1984. ISBN 0-313-24193-7.

=== Heraldry ===
- Brooke-Little, J. P. An heraldic alphabet. Robson Books, 1998. ISBN 1-86105-077-1.
- Burke, John Bernard (1884). The General Armory of England, Scotland, and Ireland. London: Harrison.
- Carraffa, Alberto García, Arturo García Carraffa. Enciclopedia heráldica y genealógica hispano-americana. Impr. de A. Marzo, 1919–1963.
- Chesshyre, D.H.B, T. Woodcock. Dictionary of British arms: Medieval ordinary. Society of Antiquaries of London, 1992.
- Fairbairn, James (1993). Fairbairn's Book of Crests of the Families of Great Britain and Ireland (4th rev. and enlarged ed.). Baltimore, MD: Genealogical Publishing. ISBN 978-0-8063-0107-5.
- Fox-Davies, Arthur Charles. The art of heraldry: An encyclopaedia of armory. Bloomsbury Books, 1986. ISBN 0-906223-34-2.
- Fox-Davies, Arthur Charles (1915). The Book of Public Arms. London and Edinburgh: Jack.
- Franklyn, Julian, John Tanner. An encyclopaedic dictionary of heraldry. Pergamon Press, [1969]. ISBN 0-08-013297-9.
- Friar, Stephen. A Dictionary of heraldry. Harmony Books, 1987. ISBN 0-517-56665-6.
- Gough, Henry, James Parker. A glossary of terms used in heraldry. Gale Research, 1966.
- Rietstap, Johannes Baptist (1884–1887). Armorial general (in French). Gouda: van Goor.
- Rietstap, Johannes Baptist (1903–1926). Armoires des familles contenues dans l'Armorial general. Paris: Inst. Heraldique Universel.

=== Orders and decorations ===
- Burke, John Bernard (1858). The Book of Orders of Knighthood and Decorations of Honour of All Nations. London: Hurst and Blackett.
- Debrett's peerage and baronetage. Debrett's Peerage Ltd., 1802–. ISBN 0-333-66093-5.
- Nicolas, Nicholas Harris (1842). History of the Orders of Knighthood of the British Empire. London: Hunter.
- Snowden, James Ross (1809–1878) Director of the Mint: United States Mint. (1861) A Description of the Medals of Washington; And of Other Objects of Interest in the Museum of the Mint. Illustrated, to Which Are Added Biographical Notices of the Directors of the Mint from 1892 to the Year 1851. (Philadelphia: J. B. Lippincott & Co.), pp. 73-74.
- Wyllie, Robert E. (1921). Orders, Decorations and Insignia, Military and Civil. New York, London: Putnam.

== Government ==
- Broughton, Bradford B., Megan Broughton Blumbergs. Dictionary of medieval knighthood and chivalry. Greenwood Press, 1986. ISBN 0-313-24552-5.
- Hawkesworth, Mary & Maurice Kogan. Encyclopedia of Government and Politics. Routledge, 1992.
- Snyder, Louis. Encyclopedia of Nationalism. Paragon House, 1990.

=== American government and politics ===
- Council of State Governments. The book of the states. Council of State Governments, 1935–. ISSN 0068-0125.

==== American law ====
- Belli, Melvin & Allen P. Wilkinson. Everybody's Guide to the Law: The First Place to Look for the Legal Information You Need Most. Rev. ed., Harcourt Brace Jovanovich, 1986.
- Biographical directory of the federal judiciary, 1789–2000. Bernan, 2001. ISBN 978-0-89059-258-8.
- Chandler, Ralph C. The Constitutional Law Dictionary. ABC-CLIO, 1985–87.
- Corpus Juris Secundum: A Complete Restatement of the Entire American Law as Developed by All Recorded Cases. West Publishing Co., 1936–.
- Dobelis, Inge. Reader's Digest Family Legal Guide. Reader's Digest Association, 1981.
- Foner, Eric. Freedom's lawmakers: A directory of black officeholders during Reconstruction. Louisiana State University Press, 1996. ISBN 0-8071-2082-0.
- The Guide to American Law: Everyone's Legal Encyclopedia. West Publishing Co., 1983–1985.
- Hauser, Thomas. The Family Legal Companion. Rev. ed., Allworth Press, 1992.
- Janosik, Robert J. Encyclopedia of the American Judicial System. Scribner's, 1987.
- Johnson, Barnabas D. Almanac of the federal judiciary. Aspen Law and Business, [1984]–. ISBN 1-56706-154-0.
- Leadership Directories. Judicial yellow book: who's who in federal and state courts. Leadership Directories, 1995–. ISSN 1082-3298.
- Leonard, Arthur S. Sexuality and the Law: An Encyclopedia of Major Legal Cases. Garland, 1993.
- Levy, Leonard W. Encyclopedia of the American Constitution. Macmillan, 1986.
- Marquis Who's Who, Inc. Who's who in American law. Marquis Who's Who, Inc. 1977–. ISSN 0162-7880.
- Newman, Roger K. The Yale biographical dictionary of American law. Yale University Press, 2009. ISBN 978-0-300-11300-6.
- Reincke, Mary, Jeanenn C. Wilhelmi, Reginal Bishop Forster and Associates. The American bench: judges of the nation. Reginald Bishop Forster and Associates, 1977–. ISSN 0160-2578.
- Renstrom, Peter G. The American Law Dictionary. ABC-CLIO, 1991.
- Ross, Martin J. Handbook of Everyday Law. 4th ed., HarperCollins, 1981.
- Wallman, Lester and Lawrence Schwarz. Handbook of Family Law. Prentice-Hall, 1989.
- You and the Law. 3rd ed., Reader's Digest Association, 1984.

===== United States Supreme Court =====
- Congressional Quarterly's Guide to the U. S. Supreme Court. 2nd ed., Congressional Quarterly Books, 1990.
- Cushman, Clare. The Supreme Court justices: illustrated biographies, 1789–2012. CQ Press, 2013. ISBN 978-1-60871-832-0.
- Elliot, Stephen P. Reference Guide to the United States Supreme Court. Facts on File, 1986.
- Friedman, Leon, Fred L. Israel. Justices of the United States Supreme Court: their lives and major opinions. Facts On File, 2013. ISBN 978-0-8160-7015-2.
- Hall, Kermit L. The Oxford Companion to the Supreme Court of the United States. Oxford University Press, 1992.
- Hixson, Richard. Mass Media and the Constitution: An Encyclopedia of Supreme Court Cases. Garland, 1989.
- Johnson, John W. Historic U. S. Court Cases, 1690–1990: An Encyclopedia. Garland, 1992.
- Lieberman, Jethro K. The Evolving Constitution: How the Supreme Court Has Ruled on Issues from Abortion to Zoning. Random House, 1992.
- Supreme Court A to Z: A Ready Reference Encyclopedia. Congressional Quarterly Books, 1993.
- Urofsky, Melvin I. 100 Americans making constitutional history: A biographical history. CQ Press, 2004. ISBN 1-56802-799-0.
- Urofsky, Melvin I. Biographical encyclopedia of the Supreme Court: the lives and legal philosophies of the justices. CQ Press, 2006. ISBN 978-1-933116-48-8.
- Wagman, Robert J. The Supreme Court: A Citizen's Guide. Pharos Books, 1992.

==== American politics ====
- American political leaders, 1789–2005. CQ Press, 2005. ISBN 1-56802-967-5.
- Buhle, Mary Jo. Encyclopedia of the American Left. Garland, 1990.
- Buhle, Mari Jo, Paul Buhle, Dan Georgakas. Encyclopedia of the American left. Oxford University Press, 1998. ISBN 0-19-512088-4.
- Greene, Jack P. Encyclopedia of American Political History: Studies of the Principal movements and Ideas. Scribner's, 1984.
- Kestenbaum, Lawrence. The political graveyard: A database of historic cemeteries. Lawrence Kestenbaum, 1996–. available here.
- KnowWho, Inc. MyGovernment. Gale Cengage Learning, 2012. available online here.
- Krusche, Earl. Encyclopedia of Third Parties in the United States. ABC-CLIO, 1991.
- Kurian, George Thomas, Jeffrey D. Schultz. The encyclopedia of the Democratic Party. Sharpe Reference, 1997. ISBN 1-56324-729-1.
- Kurian, George Thomas, Jeffrey D. Schultz. The encyclopedia of the Republican Party. Sharpe Reference, 1997. ISBN 1-56324-729-1.
- Maisel, L. Sandy & Charles Bassett. Political Parties and Elections in the United States: An Encyclopedia. Garland, 1991.
- Marquis Who's Who. Who's who in American politics. Marquis Who's Who, 1967/68-.
- Mongillo, John F., Bibi Booth. Environmental activists. Greenwood Press, 2001. ISBN 0-313-30884-5.
- O'Dea, Suzanne. From suffrage to the Senate: America's political women: an encyclopedia of leaders, causes & issues. Grey House Publ., 2013. ISBN 978-1-61925-010-9.
- Plano, Jack C. & Milton Greenberg. The American Political Dictionary. 8th ed., Holt, 1989.
- Renstrom, Peter and Chester Rogers. Electoral Politics Dictionary. ABC-CLIO, 1989.
- Schenken, Suzanne O'Dea, Ann W. Richards. From suffrage to the Senate: An encyclopedia of American women in politics. ABC-CLIO, 1999. ISBN 0-87436-960-6.
- Shafritz, Jay. Dorsey Dictionary of American Government and Politics. Dorsey Press, 1988.
- Shafritz, Jay. HarperCollins Dictionary of American Government and Politics. HarperCollins, 1992.
- Theis, Paul A., Edmund Lee Henshaw. Who's who in American politics. Bowker. ISSN 0000-0205.
- Young, Michael. American Dictionary of Campaigns and Elections. Hamilton Press, 1987.

===== American diplomacy and foreign policy =====
- Brune, Lester. Chronological History of United States Foreign Relations. Garland, 1985, 1991.
- DeConde, Alexander. Encyclopedia of American Foreign Policy: Studies of the Principal Movements and Ideas. Scribner's, 1978.
- Findling, John E. Dictionary of American Diplomatic History. 2nd ed., Greenwood, 1989.
- Flanders, Stephen & Carl. Dictionary of American Foreign Affairs. Macmillan, 1993.

===== American legislature =====
- CQ's politics in America. CQ Press, 1999–. ISSN 1527-8913.
- Congress A to Z: A Ready Reference Encyclopedia. 2nd ed., Congressional Quarterly, 1993.
- Elliott, Jeffrey and Sheikh Ali. Presidential-Congressional Political Dictionary. ABC-CLIO, 1984.
- Silbey, Joel H. Encyclopedia of the American Legislative System: Studies of the Principal Structures, Processes, and Policies of Congress and State Legislatures Since the Colonial Era. Scribner's, 1994.
- Struglinski, Suzanne. The almanac of the unelected. Bernan Associates, 1988–. ISSN 1047-0999.

====== United States Congress ======
- Foerstel, Karen. Biographical dictionary of congressional women. Greenwood Press, 1999. ISBN 0-313-30290-1.
- Kaptur, Marcy. Women of Congress: A twentieth-century odyssey. Congressional Quarterly, 1996. ISBN 0-87187-989-1.
- Michael, W. H. Official congressional directory. U.S. Government Printing Office, 1888–. ISSN 0160-9890.
- Ragsdale, Bruce A., Joel D. Treese, Office of the Historian of the House of Representatives. Black Americans in Congress, 1870–1989. U. S. Government Printing Office, 1990.

===== American presidency =====
- American presidents: Life portraits. National Cable Satellite Corporation, 1999–. Available online here.
- De Gregorio, William. Complete Book of U. S. Presidents. 4th ed., Dembner Books, 1993.
- Elliott, Jeffrey and Sheikh Ali. Presidential-Congressional Political Dictionary. ABC-CLIO, 1984.
- Graff, Henry. The Presidents: A Reference History. Scribner's, 1984.
- Kane, Joseph Nathan. Facts About the Presidents. 6th ed., H. W. Wilson, 1993.
- Levy, Leonard W. & Louis Fisher. Encyclopedia of the American Presidency. Simon & Schuster, 1993.
- Montgomery-Massingberd, Hugh. Burke's presidential families of the United States of America. Burke's Peerage; British Book Center, 1981. ISBN 0-85011-033-5.
- Nelson, Michael. Guide to the presidency. CQ Press, 2008. ISBN 978-0-87289-362-7.
- Nelson, Michael. The Presidency A to Z: A Ready Reference Encyclopedia. Congressional Quarterly, 1992.
- Peters, Gerhard, John T. Woolley. The presidency A to Z. CQ Press, 2013. ISBN 978-1-60871-908-2.
- Whitney, David. American Presidents. 7th ed., Prentice-Hall Press, 1990.

=== Executive ===
- Opfell, Olga S. Women prime ministers and presidents. McFarland, 1993. ISBN 0-89950-790-5.
- Wigfall, Patricia Moss; Kalantari, Behrooz (2001). Biographical Dictionary of Public Administration. Greenwood Publishing Group. ISBN 978-0-313-30203-9.

==== Royalty ====
- Alexander, Marc. A companion to the royal heritage of Britain. Sutton, 2005. ISBN 978-0-7509-3268-4.

=== Law and the judiciary ===
- Jiles, Elena Caffarena de (1959). Diccionario de jurisprudencia Chilena (in Spanish). Editorial Jurídica de Chile.
- Gatti, Richard and Daniel. New Encyclopedic Dictionary of School Law. Parker Publishing, 1983.
- Kritzer, Herbert M. Legal systems of the world: A political, social, and cultural encyclopedia. ABC-CLIO, 2002. ISBN 1-57607-231-2.
- McCarthy, J. Thomas. McCarthy's Desk Encyclopedia of Intellectual Property. BNA Books, 1991.
- Walker, David M. The Oxford Companion to Law. Oxford University Press, 1980.

==== Women and the law ====
- Niles, Gayle and Douglas Snider. Women's Counsel: A Legal Guide for Women. Arden Press, 1984.
- The State-by-State Guide to Women's Legal Rights. McGraw-Hill, 1987.

==== Crime and law enforcement ====
- Dictionary of Crime: Criminal Justice, Criminology and Law Enforcement. Paragon House, 1992.
- Fay, John J. Police Dictionary and Encyclopedia. Charles C. Thomas, 1988.
- Greene, Jack R., ed. (2003). "Encyclopedia of Police Science: 2-Volume Set". The Encyclopedia of Police Science. Vol. 1 (3rd ed.). New York: Routledge/Amazon Digital Services, Inc. ISBN 978-0-415-64223-1.
- Kadish, Sanford H. The Encyclopedia of Crime and Justice. Free Press, 1983.
- Kurian, George Thomas. World Encyclopedia of Police Forces and Penal Systems. Facts on File, 1989.
- Nash, Jay Robert. Encyclopedia of World Crime: Criminal Justice, Criminology, and Law Enforcement. CrimeBooks, 1990.
- Sifakis, Carl. The Encyclopedia of American Crime. rev. ed., Smithmark, 1992.
- Sifakis, Carl. The mafia encyclopedia. Facts on File, 2005. ISBN 0-8160-5694-3.
- Williams, Vergil L. Dictionary of American Penology. Greenwood, 1987.

==== Legal rights ====
- Harer, John B. Intellectual Freedom: A Reference Handbook. ABC-CLIO, 1992.

===== Human and civil rights =====
- Bradley, David, Shelley Fisher Fishkin. The encyclopedia of civil rights in America. Sharpe Reference, 1998. ISBN 0-7656-8000-9.
- Cookson, Catharine. Encyclopedia of religious freedom. Routledge, 2003. ISBN 0-415-94181-4.
- Lawson, Edward. Encyclopedia of Human Rights. Taylor & Francis, 1991.
- Lowery, Charles D., John F. Marszalek, Thomas Adams Upchurch. The Greenwood encyclopedia of African American civil rights: From emancipation to the twenty-first century. Greenwood Press, 2003. ISBN 0-313-32171-X.
- Rosales, Francisco A. Dictionary of Latino civil rights history. Arte Público Press, 2006. ISBN 1-55885-347-2.

==== Philosophy of law ====
- Gray, Christopher Berry. The philosophy of law: An encyclopedia. Garland Publishing, 1999. ISBN 0-8153-1344-6.

=== Legislature ===
- Foerstel, Karen (1999). Biographical Dictionary of Congressional Women. Greenwood Publishing Group. ISBN 978-0-313-30290-9.

=== Politics and political science ===
- Benewick, Robert, Philip Green. The Routledge dictionary of twentieth-century political thinkers. Routledge, 1998. ISBN 0-415-15881-8.
- The Blackwell Encyclopedia of Political Institutions. Blackwell, 1988.
- Camp, Roderic A. Mexican political biographies: 1884–1935. University of Texas Press, 1991. ISBN 978-0-292-75119-4.
- Evans, Graham and Jefffey Newnham. Dictionary of World Politics: A Reference Guide to Concepts, Ideas and Institutions. Simon & Schuster, 1990.
- Gunson, Phil, Andrew Thompson, Greg Chamberlain. The dictionary of contemporary politics of South America. Routledge, 1989. ISBN 0-415-02808-6.
- Hawkesworth, Mary & Maurice Kogan. Encyclopedia of Government and Politics. Routledge, 1992.
- Joignant, Alfredo; Díaz, Francisco Javier; Navia, Patricio (2012). Diccionario de la política chilena (in Spanish). Sudamericana. ISBN 978-956-262-383-4.
- Krieger, Joel. The Oxford Companion to Politics of the World. Oxford University Press, 1993.
- Lane, A. T. (1995). Biographical Dictionary of European Labor Leaders. Greenwood Publishing Group. ISBN 978-0-313-29899-8.
- Law, Cheryl. Women, a modern political dictionary. I.B. Tauris, 2000. ISBN 1-86064-502-X.
- Miller, David. The Blackwell Encyclopedia of Political Thought. Blackwell, 1987.
- Ransley, John. Chambers dictionary of political biography. Chambers, 1991. ISBN 0-550-17251-3.
- Rees, Philip. Biographical dictionary of the extreme right since 1890. Simon & Schuster, 1990. ISBN 0-13-089301-3.
- Riff, M. A. Dictionary of Modern Political Ideologies. St. Martin's, 1987.
- Stevenson, John. The Columbia Dictionary of European Political History Since 1914. Columbia Univ. Press, 1992.
- Utter, Glenn H., Charles Lockhart, Robert Jervis. American political scientists: A dictionary. Greenwood Press, 2002. ISBN 0-313-31957-X.

==== African politics ====
- Williams, Gwyneth and Brian Hackland. The Dictionary of Contemporary Politics of Southern Africa. Simon & Schuster, 1989.

==== Asian politics ====
- Liefer, Michael. The Dictionary of Contemporary Politics of Southeast Asia. Simon & Schuster, 1993.
- Senate of the Philippines. Senate of the Philippines. Available online here.
- Stockwin, J. A. A. Dictionary of the modern politics of Japan. Routledge Curzon, 2003. ISBN 0-415-15170-8.
- Ziring, Lawrence. The Middle East: A Political Dictionary. 2nd ed, ABC-CLIO, 1992.

==== Latin American politics ====
- Gunson, Phil & Greg Chamberlain. The Dictionary of Contemporary Politics of Central America and the Caribbean. Simon & Schuster, 1991.
- Gunson, Phil & Greg Chamberlain. The Dictionary of Contemporary Politics of South America. Simon & Schuster, 1989.
- Kapiszewski, Diana, Alexander Kazan. Encyclopedia of Latin American politics. Oryx Press, 2002. ISBN 1-57356-306-4.
- Rossi, Ernest and Jack Plano. Latin America: A Political Dictionary. ABC-CLIO, 1992.
- Sanz, Rodolfo. Diccionario para uso de chavistas, chavólogos y antichavistas. Editorial Nuevo Pensamiento Crítico, 2004. ISBN 980-12-0652-7.

==== Diplomacy and international relations ====
- Burns, Richard Dean. Encyclopedia of Arms Control and Disarmament. Scribner's, 1993.
- DeConde, Alexander, Richard Dean Burns, Fredrik Logevall. Encyclopedia of American foreign policy. Scribner, 2002. ISBN 0-684-80657-6.
- Delury, George E. World Encyclopedia of Political Systems & Parties. 2nd ed., Facts on File, 1987.
- Hahn, Peter L. Historical dictionary of United States–Middle East relations. Scarecrow Press, 2007. ISBN 978-0-8108-5549-6.
- Laszlo, Ervin & Jong Youl Yoo. World Encyclopedia of Peace. Pergamon Press, 1986.
- Matray, James Irving. East Asia and the United States: An encyclopedia of relations since 1784. Greenwood Press, 2002. ISBN 0-313-30557-9.
- Phillips, Charles, Alan Axelrod. Encyclopedia of historical treaties and alliances. Facts On File, 2006. ISBN 0-8160-6075-4.
- Plano, Jack C. & Roy Olton. The International Relations Dictionary. 4th ed., ABC-CLIO, 1988.
- Sutter, Robert G. Historical dictionary of Chinese foreign policy. Scarecrow Press, 2011. ISBN 978-0-8108-6860-1.
- Van Sant, John E., Peter Mauch, Yoneyuki Sugita. Historical dictionary of United States–Japan relations. Scarecrow Press, 2007. ISBN 978-0-8108-5608-0.
- Weatherbee, Donald E. Historical dictionary of United States–Southeast Asia relations. Scarecrow Press, 2008. ISBN 978-0-8108-5542-7.

==== International organizations ====
- Clements, Frank. Historical dictionary of Arab and Islamic organizations. Scarecrow Press, 2001. ISBN 0-8108-3977-6.
- Humphreys, Norman R. Historical dictionary of the International Monetary Fund. Scarecrow Press, 1999. ISBN 0-8108-3659-9.
- Mays, Terr M., Mark DeLancey. Historical dictionary of international organizations in sub-Saharan Africa. Scarecrow Press, 2002. ISBN 0-8108-4257-2.
- Salda, Anne C. M. Historical dictionary of the World Bank. Scarecrow Press, 1997. ISBN 0-8108-3215-1.
- Union of International Associations. Yearbook of international organizations online. Union of International Associations, 2000–. Available online here.
- van Ginneken, Anique H. M. Historical dictionary of the League of Nations. Scarecrow Press, 2006. ISBN 0-8108-5473-2.

===== European Union =====
- Dinan, Desmond. Encyclopedia of the European Union. Lynne Rienner, 2000. ISBN 1-55587-904-7.
- The European Union encyclopedia and directory. Europa Publications, 1995–.
- Roy, Joaquin, Aimee Kanner. Historical dictionary of the European Union. Scarecrow Press, 2006. ISBN 0-8108-5314-0.

===== United Nations =====
- Fomerand, Jacques, A. LeRoy Bennett. Historical dictionary of the United Nations. Scarecrow Press, 2007. ISBN 978-0-8108-5494-9.
- Lee, Kelley, Jennifer Fang. Historical dictionary of the World Health Organization. Scarecrow Press, 2013. ISBN 978-0-8108-7858-7.
- Moore, John Allphin, Jerry Pubantz. Encyclopedia of the United Nations. Facts On File, 2002. ISBN 0-8160-4417-1.
- Osmanczyk, Edmund Jan. The Encyclopedia of the United Nations and International Agreements. 2nd ed., Taylor & Francis, 1990.
- Osmańczyk, Edmund Jan, Anthony Mango. Encyclopedia of the United Nations and international agreements. Routledge, 2003. ISBN 0-415-93920-8.
- Spaulding, Seth, Lin Lin. Historical dictionary of the United Nations Educational, Scientific and Cultural Organization (UNESCO). Scarecrow Press, 1997. ISBN 0-8108-3288-7.
- Stellman, Jeanne Mager, International Labour Organization. Encyclopaedia of occupational health and safety. International Labour Organization, 1998. ISBN 92-2-109203-8.
- Weiss, Thomas George, Sam Daws. The Oxford handbook on the United Nations. Oxford University Press, 2007. ISBN 978-0-19-927951-7.

==== Political ideologies ====
- Blamires, Cyprian, Paul Jackson. World fascism: A historical encyclopedia. ABC-CLIO, 2006. ISBN 1-57607-940-6.

===== Communism, Marxism, Socialism =====
- Bottomore, Tom. A Dictionary of Marxist Thought. 2nd ed., Blackwell, 1992.
- Carver, Terrell. A Marx Dictionary. Barnes & Noble, 1987.
- Klein, Donald W., Anne B. Clark. Biographic dictionary of Chinese communism, 1921–1965. Harvard University Press, 1971. ISBN 0-674-07410-6.
- Lamb, Peter, J. C. Docherty. Historical dictionary of socialism. Scarecrow Press, 2006. ISBN 978-0-8108-5560-1.
- Pons, Silvio, Robert Service, Mark Epstein, Charles Townsend. A dictionary of 20th-century communism. Princeton University Press, 2010. ISBN 978-0-691-13585-4.
- Wildzynski, Jozef. Encyclopedic Dictionary of Marxism, Socialism and Communism. Walter de Gruyter, 1981.

===== Conservatism and Libertarianism =====
- Ashford, Nigel and Stephen Davies. Dictionary of Conservative and Libertarian Thought. Routledge, 1991.
- Hamowy, Ronald, ed. (2008). The Encyclopedia of Libertarianism. Sage; Cato Institute. doi:10.4135/9781412965811. ISBN 978-1-4129-6580-4.

== Human sexuality, reproduction, and child care ==
- Adamec, Christine & William L. Pierce. The Encyclopedia of Adoption. Facts on File, 1991.
- Bechtel, Stefan. The Practical Encyclopedia of Sex and Health: From Aphrodisiacs and Hormones to Potency, Stress and Yeast Infection. Rodale Press, 1993.
- Bullough, Vern L. Human Sexuality: An Encyclopedia. Garland, 1993.
- Carrera, Michael. Language of Sex: An A-to-Z Guide. Facts on File, 1992.
- Clark, Robin E. & Judith Freeman Clark. The Encyclopedia of Child Abuse. Facts on File, 1989.
- The Columbia University College of Physicians and Surgeons Complete Guide to Pregnancy. Crown, 1989.
- Ellis, Albert & Albert Arabanel. Encyclopedia of Sexual Behavior. rev. ed., Aronson, 1973.
- Francoeur, Robert A. A Descriptive Dictionary and Atlas of Sexology. Greenwood, 1991.
- International Encyclopedia of Sexuality (ISBN 0-8264-1274-2)
- Kahn, Ada P. & Linda Hughey Holt. The A-to-Z of Women's Sexuality: A Concise Encyclopedia. rev. ed., Hunter House, 1992.
- Leonard, Arthur S. Sexuality and the Law: An Encyclopedia of Major Legal Cases. Garland, 1993.
- Lerner, Richard M. Encyclopedia of Adolescence. Garland, 1991.
- Monger, George P. Marriage customs of the world: an encyclopedia of dating customs and wedding traditions. ABC-CLIO, 2013. ISBN 978-1-59884-663-8.
- Rothman, Barbara Katz. Encyclopedia of Childbearing: Critical Perspectives. Oryx Press, 1993.

=== Child care ===
- Franck, Irene & David Brownstone. The Parent's Desk Reference: The Ultimate Family Encyclopedia from Conception to College. Prentice Hall, 1991.
- Leach, Penelope. Child Care Encyclopedia. Knopf, 1984.
- Lovejoy, Frederick H. & David Estridge. The New Child Health Encyclopedia: The Complete Guide for Parents, prepared by the Boston's Children's Hospital. rev. ed., Delacorte Press, 1987.
- Martin, April. Lesbian and Gay Parenting Handbook: Creating and Raising Our Families. HarperCollins, 1993.
- Spock, Benjamin and Michael Rothenberg. Dr. Spock's Baby and Child Care. rev. ed., Dutton, 1985.
- Subak-Sharpe, Genell. The Columbia University College of Physicians and Surgeons Complete Guide to Early Child Care. Crown, 1990.

=== Homosexuality ===
- Aldrich, Robert, Garry Wotherspoon. Who's who in gay and lesbian history: From antiquity to World War II. Routledge, 2002. ISBN 0-415-15982-2.
- Dynes, Wayne R., Warren Johansson, William A. Percy. Encyclopedia of homosexuality. Garland, 1990. ISBN 0-8240-6544-1.
- Martin, April. Lesbian and Gay Parenting Handbook: Creating and Raising Our Families. HarperCollins, 1993.

== Labour and Industrial Relations ==
- Blanpain, R. (ed.). The International Encyclopaedia for Labour Law and Industrial Relations. Archived from the original on June 9, 2014.
- Docherty, J. C., Jacobus Hermanus, Antonius van der Velden. Historical dictionary of organized labor. Scarecrow Press, 2012. ISBN 978-0-8108-6196-1.
- Maitron, Jean, Georges Haupt. Dictionnaire biographique du mouvement ouvrier international. Editions ouvrières, 1971–.
- Maitron, Jean, Claude Pennetier. Dictionnaire biographique du mouvement ouvrier français. Editions Ouvrières, [1964]–1997. ISBN 2-7082-2424-7. (French).
- Roberts, Harold S. (1986). Roberts' Dictionary of Industrial Relations (3rd ed.). Washington D.C.: Bureau of National Affairs. ISBN 978-0-87179-488-8.
- Stellman, Jeanne Mager, International Labour Organization. Encyclopaedia of occupational health and safety. International Labour Organization, 1998. ISBN 92-2-109203-8.

== Language and linguistics ==
- Asher, R. E. and J. M. Y. Simpson. Encyclopedia of Language and Linguistics. Pergamon Press.
- Bright, William. International Encyclopedia of Linguistics. Oxford University Press, 1991.
- Brown, E. K.; Asher, R. E.; Simpson, J. M. Y. (2006). Encyclopedia of Language and Linguistics. Elsevier. ISBN 978-0-08-044299-0.
- Campbell, George L. Compendium of the World's Languages. Routledge, 1991.
- Chapman, Siobhan, Christopher Routledge. Key thinkers in linguistics and the philosophy of language. Oxford University Press, 2005. ISBN 978-0-19-518767-0.
- Collinge, N. E. Encyclopedia of Language. Routledge, 1990.
- Comrie, Bernard. World's Major Languages. Oxford University Press, 1987.
- Crystal, David. The Cambridge Encyclopedia of Language. Cambridge University Press, 1987.
- Crystal, David (2010), The Cambridge Encyclopedia of Language, Cambridge University Press, 524 pages. ISBN 978-0-521-73650-3.
- Ducrot, Oswald and Tzvetan Todorov. Encyclopedic Dictionary of the Sciences of Language. Johns Hopkins University Press, 1979.
- Frawley, William J. (2003). International Encyclopedia of Linguistics: 4-Volume Set. Oxford University Press. ISBN 978-0-19-513977-8.
- Houdé, Olivier Daniel Kayser, Vivian Waltz, Christian Cav. Dictionary of cognitive science: Neuroscience, psychology, artificial intelligence, linguistics, and philosophy. Psychology Press, 2004. ISBN 1-57958-251-6.
- Katzner, Kenneth. Languages of the World. Rev. ed., Routledge, 1986.
- Malmkjaer, Kirsten and James M. Anderson. Linguistics Encyclopedia. Routledge, 1991.
- McArthur, Tom (ed) (1992), The Oxford Companion to the English Language, Oxford University Press, 1,184 pages. ISBN 978-2-643-45183-8.
- Stammerjohann, Harro, Sylvain Auroux. Lexicon Grammaticorum: a bio-bibliographical companion to the history of linguistics. Max Niemeyer Verlag, 2009. ISBN 978-3-484-73068-7.

== Libraries and information science ==
- Ash, Lee, Bernhard A. Uhlendorf, Council of National Library Associations. A biographical directory of librarians in the United States and Canada. American Library Association, 1970. ISBN 0-8389-0084-4.
- Bates Marcia J and Mary Niles Maack. 2010. Encyclopedia of Library and Information Sciences. 3rd ed. Boca Raton FL: CRC Press.
- Beran, Robert J., Sandra Whiteley, Joel M. Lee, American Library Association. Who's who in library and information services. American Library Association, 1982. ISBN 0-8389-0351-7.
- Drake, Miriam A. 2003. Encyclopedia of Library and Information Science. 2nd ed. New York: Marcel Dekker.
- Kent, Allen, Harold Lancour and Jay E. Daily. Encyclopedia of Library and Information Sciences (1st Edition, 73 Volumes), 1968–2003.
- McDonald John D and Michael Levine-Clark. 2018. Encyclopedia of Library and Information Sciences Fourth ed. Boca Raton FL: CRC Press.
- Pioneers of library and information science. University of South Carolina, College of Library and Information Science, 1996?. Available online here.
- Wilhite, Jeffrey M., Todd J. Kosmerick, Laurie Scrivener, Susan Houck. International biographical directory of national archivists, documentalists, and librarians. Scarecrow Press, 2000. ISBN 0-8108-3780-3.
- Zhou, Peter X. Collecting Asia: East Asian libraries in North America, 1868–2008. Association for Asian Studies, 2010. ISBN 978-0-924304-56-9.

== Maritime and Nautical ==
- Hattendorf, John B. The Oxford encyclopedia of maritime history. Oxford University Press, 2007. ISBN 978-0-19-513075-1.

=== Nautical dictionaries and encyclopædias ===
- A naval encyclopædia: comprising a dictionary of nautical words and phrases; biographical notices, and records of naval officers; special articles of naval art and science. Philadelphia, Pennsylvania: L.R. Hamersly & Co. 1881. Archived from the original on March 7, 2015. "[Consulted while compiling this work:] Smyth's Sailor's Word-book, Falconer's Marine Dictionary, Burn's Naval and Military Technical Dictionary, Cooper's Naval History, Bedford's Sailor's Pocket-book, Luce's Seamanship, Nares's Seamanship, Totten's Naval Textbook, Dana's Seaman's Friend, Harbord's Glossary of Navigation, Bowditch's Navigator, Loomis s Astronomy, Peabody's Astronomy, Proctor's Handbook of the Stars, Cooke's Naval Gunnery, Ordnance Instructions (1880), Lippincott's Gazetteer, Wilson's Ship-building, Very's Navies of the World, King's War-ships and Navies of the World, Knight's Mechanical Dictionary, Sleeman's Torpedoes and Torpedo Warfare (Electricity), Myer's Manual of Signals, Navy Regulations, Webster's Dictionary, Worcester's Dictionary, Brande's Encyclopaedia, Chambers's Encyclopaedia, Appleton's Encyclopaedia, Johnson's Encyclopaedia, Kent's Commentaries, Sharswood's Blackstone."at Internet Archive
- Bathe, Basil W.; Villiers, Alan (1978). The Visual Encyclopedia of Nautical Terms Under Sail. New York: Crown Publishers Inc. ISBN 978-0-517-53317-8.
- Bedford, Frederick George D. (1885). The sailor's pocket book: A collection of rules, notes and tables for the use of the Royal Navy, the Mercantile Marine, and yacht squadrons (PDF) (Hardcover) (4th ed.). Portsmouth: Griffin & Co.
- Blackburn, Graham (2002). The Illustrated Encyclopaedia of Ships and Boats (Hardcover). London: I.B. Tauris. p. 263. ISBN 1-86064-839-8.
- Blackmore, David S.T. (2009). The Seafaring Dictionary: Terms, Idioms and Legends of the Past and Present (illustrated ed.). McFarland, Incorporated, Publishers. ISBN 978-0-7864-4266-9.
- Blume, Kenneth J. (2012). Historical Dictionary of the U.S. Maritime Industry (Print). Lanham, Maryland: Scarecrow Press. ISBN 978-0-8108-7963-8.
- boatcourse.com. "Nautical Dictionary" (PDF). boatcourse.com.
- Bowditch's American Practical Navigator
- Burney, William (January 1, 1815). A New Universal Dictionary of the Marine: With a Vocabulary of French Sea-phrases (PDF). T Cadell & W Davies – via Google book.
- Chapman, Charles Frederick (1917). Practical motor boat handling, seamanship and piloting; a handbook containing information which every motor boatman should know. New York: MoToR Boating/Internet Archive.
- Chapman Piloting & Seamanship, published by Hearst Books, a Division of Sterling Publishing Co., Inc.
- Chatterton, Edward Keble (1912). Fore and aft, the story of the fore & aft rig from the earliest times to the present day. Philadelphia, London: J. B. Lippincott company, Seeley, Service & Co. Ltd. pp. vii, 232–233. at Internet Archive
- Cutler, Deborah W.; Cutler, Thomas J. (March 2005). Dictionary of Naval Abbreviations (Fourth ed.). Annapolis, Maryland: U.S. Naval Institute. ISBN 978-1-59114-152-5.
- Dana, Richard Henry (December 31, 1847). The Seaman's Friend: Containing a treatise on practical seamanship, with plates, a dictionary of sea terms, customs and usages of the merchant service (PDF) (1st ed.). T. Groom.
- Dana, Richard Henry (November 25, 2019) [1847]. The Seaman's Friend: Containing a treatise on practical seamanship, with plates, a dictionary of sea terms, customs and usages of the merchant service (Kindle ed.). BiblioBazaar. ISBN 978-1-240-42312-5.
- Falconer, William (December 31, 1805). The Mariner's Dictionary, Or American Seaman's Vocabulary of Technical Terms, and Phrases Used in the Construction, Equipment, Management and Military Operations. of Ships and Vessels of All Descriptions: Improved from an English Work [i.e. W. F.'s Marine Dictionary] (PDF) (Illustrated, with Copperplates, descriptive of all objects appertaining to seamanship ed.). Washington City.
- "Flagship Glossary of Nautical Terms" (PDF). Flagship Maritime Training. September 13, 2009. Archived from the original (PDF) on February 22, 2014.
- Glickman, Todd S., ed. (June 2000). Meteorology Glossary (electronic) (2nd ed.). Cambridge, Massachusetts: American Meteorological Society.
- Gustavo Herrera, Roberto; García-Herrera, Ricardo; Prieto, Luis; Gallego, David; Hernández, Emiliano; Gimeno, Luis; Können, Gunther; Koek, Frits; Wheeler, Dennis; Wilkinson, Clive; Del Rosario Prieto, Maria; Báez, Carlos; Woodruff, Scott. A Dictionary of Nautical Meteorological Terms: CLIWOC Multilingual Dictionary of Meteorological Terms; An English/Spanish/French/Dutch Dictionary of Windforce Terms Used by Mariners from 1750 to 1850 (PDF). CLIWOC. Archived from the original (PDF) on April 21, 2021.
- Harbord, J.B. (1865). Definitions of Astronomy and Navigation Made Easy (PDF) (Hardbound). Glasgow, London: William Blackwood & Sons.
- Jeans, Peter D. (1998). An Ocean of Words: A Dictionary of Nautical Words and Phrases (illustrated, annotated ed.). Carol Publishing Group. ISBN 978-1-55972-450-0.
- Hope, Ranger (2007). "A Seaman's Dictionary" (PDF). Hope Ranger.
- Layton, C.W.T.; Clissold, Peter; Miller, A. G. W. (1994). Dictionary of Nautical Words and Terms: 8000 Definitions in Navigation, Seamanship, Rigging, Meteorology, Astronomy, Naval Architecture, Average, Ship Economics, Hydrography, Cargo Stowage, Marine Engineering, Ice Terminology, Buoyage, Yachting, etc (PDF) (Revised Fourth ed.). Glasgow: Brown, Son & Ferguson. Archived from the original (PDF) on February 27, 2014.
- Luce, S. B.; Ward, Aaron; Seabury, S. (1997–2007) [1834]. Text-Book of Seamanship: The Equipping and Handling of Vessels Under Sail or Steam for the Use of the United States Naval Academy (Revised and enlarged ed.). New York: Van Nostrand Company for U.S. Naval Academy/Smith & McDougal, Electrotypers/maritime.org.
- MacEwen, W. A.; Lewis, A. H. (1953). Encyclopedia of Nautical Knowledge Hardcover (hardcover). Cambridge, Maryland: Cornell Maritime Pr/Tidewater Pub. p. 626. ISBN 978-0-87033-010-0.
- MacKenzie, Mike (2005–2012). "Home page". Sea Talk Nautical Dictionary: The Dictionary of English Nautical Language. Archived from the original on February 17, 2006.
- Mayne, Richard (2000). The Language of Sailing (Print). Chicago: Fitzroy Dearborn; Taylor & Francis. p. 282. ISBN 1-57958-278-8.
- "Naval Terms & Abbreviations Dictionary". Ermilogic. – Android App
- Roebuck, Thomas; Smythe, William Carmichael (1848). An English and Hindoostanee Naval Dictionary of Technical Terms and Sea Phrases ... (4th ed.).
- Rousmaniere, John (1998). The Illustrated Dictionary of Boating Terms: 2000 Essential Terms for Sailors and Powerboaters (Paperback). W. W. Norton & Company. pp. 174. ISBN 978-0-393-33918-5.
- Smith, John (2010) [1692]. The sea-mans grammar and dictionary explaining all the difficult terms in navigation: and the practical navigator and gunner: in two parts by John Smith (Paperback). BiblioBazaar. ISBN 978-1-240-42312-5.
- Smyth, W. H.; Belcher, E. (1867). The sailor's word-book: An alphabetical digest of nautical terms, including some more especially military and scientific as well as archaisms of early voyagers, etc. London: Blackie and Son. pp. 747.
- Tuffley, David (2014). Nautical Terms: A Dictionary. Createspace Independent Pub. ISBN 978-1-4952-6781-9. 9781495267819.
- Tucker, Spencer C., ed. (2010). The Civil War Naval Encyclopedia (Hardcover). Vol. 2. Santa Barbara, California: ABC-CLIO. ISBN 978-1-59884-338-5.
- Wedertz, Bill (1984). Dictionary of Naval Abbreviations. Annapolis, Maryland: Naval Institute Press. ISBN 0-87021-155-2.
- West, Niels (2004). Marine Affairs Dictionary: Terms, Concepts, Laws, Court Cases, and International Conventions and Agreements. Greenwood Publishing Group. ISBN 978-0-313-30421-7.
- "World War II Naval Dictionary". U.S.S. Abbot DD-629. Archived from the original on December 12, 2013.
- Young, Arthur; Brisbane, James (1863). Nautical Dictionary. The Technical Language Relative to the Building and Equipment of Sailing Vessels and Steamers, Seamanship, Navigation, Nautical Astronomy, Naval Gunnery, Maritime Law and Commerce, General and Particular Average and Marine Insurance, and Other Terms Relating to Maritime Affairs. With an Appendix Containing the International Regulations for Preventing Collisions at Sea, and a Vocabulary of French Terms (PDF) (2nd ed.). London: Longman, Roberts & Green. courtesy of Columbia University

== Mathematics ==
- Bendick, Jeanne. Mathematics Illustrated Dictionary: Facts, Figures and People. rev. ed. Franklin Watts, 1989.
- Gellert, W. The VNR Concise Encyclopedia of Mathematics. 2nd ed., Van Nostrand, 1989.
- Grrattan-Guinness, Ivor. Companion Encyclopedia of the History and Philosophy of the Mathematical Sciences. Routledge, 1993.
- Hazewinkel, M. Encyclopedia of Mathematics. Kluwer Academic, 1988–93.
- Itô, Kiyosi. Encyclopedic Dictionary of Mathematics. 2nd ed., MIT Press, 1987.
- Prentice-Hall Encyclopedia of Mathematics. Prentice-Hall, 1982.
- Riddle, Larry. Biographies of women mathematicians. Agnes Scott College. Available online here.
- Rota, Gian-Carlo. Encyclopedia of Mathematics and Its Applications. Cambridge University Press, 1976–.
- Sloane, Neil J. A. The On-Line Encyclopedia of Integer Sequences. OEIS Foundation, Inc, 1964–, launched 1996. Available online here
- Soviet Mathematical Encyclopedia. 1977–85.
- Thomley, Jill E., Sarah J. Greenwald. Great mathematicians. Salem Press, 2013. ISBN 978-1-4298-3789-7.

== Meteorological ==
- Glickman, Todd S., ed. (June 2000). Meteorology Glossary (electronic) (2nd ed.). Cambridge, Massachusetts: American Meteorological Society.
- Gustavo Herrera, Roberto; García-Herrera, Ricardo; Prieto, Luis; Gallego, David; Hernández, Emiliano; Gimeno, Luis; Können, Gunther; Koek, Frits; Wheeler, Dennis; Wilkinson, Clive; Del Rosario Prieto, Maria; Báez, Carlos; Woodruff, Scott. A Dictionary of Nautical Meteorological Terms: CLIWOC Multilingual Dictionary of Meteorological Terms; An English/Spanish/French/Dutch Dictionary of Windforce Terms Used by Mariners from 1750 to 1850 (PDF). CLIWOC. Archived from the original (PDF) on April 21, 2021.
- "Meteorology Encyclopedia". Central Weather Bureau. Archived from the original on September 21, 2014.
- Rittner, Don. A to Z of scientists in weather and climate. Facts On File, 2003. ISBN 0-8160-4797-9.

== Music and dance ==
- Ammer, Christine. HarperCollins Dictionary of Music. 2nd ed, HarperCollins, 1987.
- Ardley, Neil. Music: An Illustrated Encyclopedia. Facts on File, 1986.
- Arnold, Denis. The New Oxford Companion to Music. Oxford 1983.
- Bayo, Javier (1997). Dicionario biográfico de la danza (in Spanish). Lib Deportivas Esteban Sanz. ISBN 978-84-85977-62-8.
- Bekker, Leander Jan De (2010). Stokes' Encyclopedia of Music and Musicians Covering the Entire Period of Musical History from the Earliest Times to the Season Of 1908–09. BiblioBazaar. ISBN 978-1-143-26991-2.
- Blom, Eric. New Everyman Dictionary of Music. 6th ed, Weidenfeld & Nicolson, 1989.
- Blume, Friedrich; Finscher, Ludwig, ed. (2007): Die Musik in Geschichte und Gegenwart, Kassel, Bärenreiter, 26 volumes (subjects 10 volumes, biographies 17 volumes, index), ISBN 978-3-476-41022-1. (in German)
- Claghorn, Charles Eugene. Women composers and hymnists: A concise biographical dictionary. Scarecrow Press, 1984. ISBN 0-8108-1680-6.
- Claghorn, Charles Eugene. Women composers and songwriters: A concise biographical dictionary. Scarecrow Press, 1996. ISBN 0-8108-3130-9.
- Cogan, Brian (2006). Encyclopedia of punk music and culture. Greenwood Press. ISBN 978-0-313-33340-8.
- Craggs, Stewart R. Soundtracks: An international dictionary of composers for film. Ashgate, 1998. ISBN 1-85928-189-3.
- Ficher, Miguel, Martha Furman Schleifer, John M. Furman. Latin American classical composers: A biographical dictionary. Scarecrow Press, 2002. ISBN 0-8108-4517-2.
- Grattan, Virginia L. American women songwriters: A biographical dictionary. Greenwood Press, 1993. ISBN 0-313-28510-1.
- Grove, George. Grove's dictionary of music and musicians. Macmillan, 1910.
- Hindley, Geoffrey (1994). Larousse Encyclopedia of Music. Barnes & Noble. ISBN 978-1-56619-571-3.
- Hitchcock, H. Wiley & Stanley Sadie. The New Grove Dictionary of American Music. Grove's Dictionaries of Music Inc, 1986.
- Horn, David; Laing, Dave; Oliver, Paul; Wicke, Peter (2003). Continuum Encyclopedia of Popular Music of the World Part 1 Media, Industry, Society. Continuum International Publishing Group. ISBN 978-0-8264-6321-0.
- Hubbard, W. L. (30 March 2005). The American History and Encyclopedia of Music: Musical Biographies Part Two. Kessinger Publishing. ISBN 978-1-4179-0713-7.
- Hurd, Michael. Oxford Junior Companion to Music. 2nd ed, Oxford, 1980.
- Kennedy, Michael. Oxford Dictionary of Music. Oxford University Press, 1985.
- Kuhn, Laura Diane (1999). Baker's Student Encyclopedia of Music: A-G. Schirmer Books. ISBN 978-0-02-865415-7.
- McNeil, W. K. (2005). Encyclopedia of American Gospel Music. Psychology Press. ISBN 978-0-415-94179-2.
- The Encyclopedia of Country Music. Oxford University Press. 4 January 2012. ISBN 978-0-19-992083-9.
- Morton, Brian, Pamela Collins. Contemporary composers. St. James Press, 1992. ISBN 1-55862-085-0.
- Moskowitz, David Vlado (2006). Caribbean Popular Music: An Encyclopedia of Reggae, Mento, Ska, Rock Steady, and Dancehall. Greenwood Publishing Group. ISBN 978-0-313-33158-9.
- Music Library, Stanford University. Music library association obituary index. Music Library, Stanford University. Available online here.
- Norman Lloyd (June 1968). The Golden Encyclopedia of Music. Golden Press. ISBN 9780307495198.
- Perone, James E. (2005). Woodstock: An Encyclopedia Of The Music and Art Fair. Greenwood Publishing Group. ISBN 978-0-313-33057-5.
- Randel, Don Michael. New Harvard Dictionary of Music. Rev. ed., Harvard University Press, 1996. ISBN 0-674-37299-9.
- Rehrig, William. The Harper Encyclopedia of Band Music: Composers and Their Music. Integrity Press, 1991.
- Sadie, Julie Anne, Rhian Samuel. The Norton/Grove dictionary of women composers. W.W. Norton, 1994. ISBN 0-393-03487-9.
- Sadie, Stanley; Latham, Alison (1994): The Norton/Grove Concise Encyclopedia of Music, W. W. Norton, 1994, 909 pages. ISBN 978-0-393-03753-1.
- Sadie, Stanley (1995), The New Grove Dictionary of Music and Musicians, 20 volumes, Oxford, Grove's Dictionaries of Music Inc, 180,000 pages, over 29,000 articles. ISBN 978-1-56159-174-9 (paperback) or ISBN 978-0-333-19174-3. Online access to the work as a component of Grove Music Online is available by subscription.
- Sadie, Stanley and Alison Latham. The Norton/Grove Concise Encyclopedia of Music, Norton, 1988.
- Slonimsky, Nicolas, Laura Diane Kuhn. Baker's biographical dictionary of musicians. Schirmer Books, 2001. ISBN 0-02-865525-7.
- Thompson, Oscar. The International Cyclopedia of Music and Musicians. 11th ed, Dodd, Mead, 1985.
- Wade-Matthews, Max; Thompson, Wendy (2010). The Encyclopedia of Music: Instruments of the Orchestra and the Great Composers. Southwater. ISBN 978-1-84476-892-9.
- Vignal, Marc, ed. (1996): Dictionnaire de la musique, Larousse-Bordas, 2 vols, 2,059 pages. ISBN 978-2-03-750013-5. (in French)

=== Classical music ===
- Butterworth, Neil. Dictionary of American classical composers. Routledge, 2005. ISBN 0-415-93848-1.
- Classical music reference library. Alexander Street Press, 2007. Available here.

=== Folk, country and western music ===
- Stamber, Irwin and Grelun Landon. The Encyclopedia of Folk Country & Western Music. 2nd ed, St Martin's Press, 1983.

==== Country music ====
- Harmony Illustrated Encyclopedia of Country Music. revised ed, Harmony Books, 1986.

=== Musical instruments ===
- Baines, Anthony. Oxford Companion to Musical Instruments. Oxford, 1992.
- Sadie, Stanley. The New Grove Dictionary of Musical Instruments. Grove's Dictionaries of Music Inc, 1984.

=== Opera ===
- Anderson, James. Harper Dictionary of Opera and Operetta. HarperCollins, 1990.
- Annesley, Charles. The standard opera-glass. Brentano, 1910.
- Hamilton, David. Metropolitan Opera Encyclopedia: A Comprehensive Guide to the World of Opera. Simon & Schuster, 1987.
- International Dictionary of Opera. St James Press, 1993.
- Kobbé, Gustave and the Earl of Harewood. The Definitive Kobbé's Opera Book. 1st American ed, Putnam, 1987.
- Mason, Leo Leop. The opera-goers' complete guide. Dodd, 1908.
- Orrey, Leslie. Encyclopedia of Opera. Scribner's, 1976.
- Rosenthal, Harold and John Warrack. Concise Oxford Dictionary of Opera. 2nd ed, Oxford, 1979.
- Sadie, Stanley. The New Grove Dictionary of Opera. Grove's Dictionaries of Music, 1992.
- Warrack, John and Ewan West. Oxford Dictionary of Opera. Oxford, 1992.

=== Popular music ===
- Clarke, Donald. Penguin Encyclopedia of Popular Music. Viking, 1989.
- Cowden, Robert H. Popular singers of the twentieth century: A bibliography of biographical materials. Greenwood Press, 1999. ISBN 0-313-29333-3.
- Gammond, Peter. Oxford Companion to Popular Music. Oxford, 1991.
- Herzhaft, Gérard. Encyclopedia of the Blues. Univ of Arkansas Press, 1992.
- Larkin, Colin. The Encyclopedia of Popular Music. Oxford University Press, 2006.
- Lax, Roger and Frederick Smith. The Great Song Thesaurus. 2nd ed, Oxford, 1989.
- Lissauer, Robert. Lissauer's Encyclopedia of Popular Music in America. Paragon House, 1981.
- Marshall Cavendish Illustrated History of Popular Music. Marshall Cavendish, 1990.
- Stambler, Irwin. Encyclopedia of Pop Rock and Soul. revised ed, St Martin's Press, 1989.

==== Jazz ====
- Feather, Leonard. Encyclopedia of Jazz. Horizon Press, 1960.
- Feather, Leonard. Encyclopedia of Jazz in the Seventies. Horizon Press, 1976.
- Feather, Leonard. Encyclopedia of Jazz in the Sixties. Horizon Press, 1967.
- Harmony Illustrated Encyclopedia of Jazz. Harmony Books, 1986.
- Kernfeld, Barry. The New Grove Dictionary of Jazz. Grove's Dictionaries of Music Inc, 1988.

==== Rock music ====
- Clifford, Mike. Harmony Illustrated Encyclopedia of Rock. 7th ed, Harmony Books, 1992.
- Hardy, Phil. Encyclopedia of Rock. rev. ed., Schirmer Books, 1988.
- Heatley, Michael. Ultimate Encyclopedia of Rock. HarperCollins, 1993.
- Nite, Norm N. Rock On: The Illustrated Encyclopedia of Rock 'n' Roll. HarperCollins, 1982–85.
- Pareles, Jon & Patricia Romanowski. Rolling Stone Encyclopedia of Rock & Roll. Simon & Schuster, 1983.

=== Regional music ===
==== American music ====
- Butterworth, Neil. Dictionary of American classical composers. Routledge, 2005. ISBN 0-415-93848-1.
- DuPree, Mary Herron. Musical Americans: A biographical dictionary, 1918–1926. Fallen Leaf Press, 1997. ISBN 0-914913-13-1.
- Southern, Eileen. Biographical dictionary of Afro-American and African musicians. Greenwood Press, 1982. ISBN 0-313-21339-9.

==== Canadian music ====
- Kallmann, Helmut. Encyclopedia of Music in Canada. 2nd ed, University of Toronto Press, 1992.

==== Cuban music ====
- Orovio, Helio. Cuban music from A to Z. Duke University Press, 2004. ISBN 0-8223-3186-1.

=== Religious music ===
- Foley, Edward, Mark Paul Bangert. Worship music: A concise dictionary. Liturgical Press, 2000. ISBN 0-8146-5889-X.
- Swain, Joseph Peter. Historical dictionary of sacred music. Scarecrow Press, 2006. ISBN 978-0-8108-5530-4.

==== Christian music ====
- Claghorn, Charles Eugene. Women composers and hymnists: A concise biographical dictionary. Scarecrow Press, 1984. ISBN 0-8108-1680-6.
- Poultney, David. Dictionary of Western Church Music. American Library Association, 1991.

=== Songs ===
- Claghorn, Charles Eugene. Women composers and songwriters: A concise biographical dictionary. Scarecrow Press, 1996. ISBN 0-8108-3130-9.
- Ewen, David. American songwriters: An H.W. Wilson biographical dictionary. H.W. Wilson, 1987. ISBN 0-8242-0744-0.

=== Dance ===
- Chujoy, Anatole; Manchester, Phyllis Winifred (1967). The Dance Encyclopedia. Touchstone. ISBN 978-0-671-22586-5. 992 pages. ISBN 978-0-671-24027-1
- Cohen, Selma Jean, ed. (1998, new edition 2004), The International Encyclopedia of Dance, Oxford University Press, 2,000 articles, 6 vols, 4,048 pages. ISBN 978-0-19-517369-7. Subscription-based access to the online version (2012), ISBN 978-0-19-518763-2.

==== Ballet ====
- Balanchine, George and Francis Mason. 101 Stories of the Great Ballets. Doubleday, 1989.
- Bremser, Martha. International Dictionary of Ballet. St. James Press, 1993.
- Clarke, Mary and Clement Crisp. Ballet Goer's Guide. Knopf, 1981.
- Koegler, Horst. The Concise Oxford Dictionary of Ballet. Oxford Univ. Press, 1982.

==== Kabuki ====
- Leiter, Samuel L. Art of Kabuki: Famous Plays in Performance. Univ. of California Press, 1979.
- Leiter, Samuel L. Kabuki Encyclopedia: An English-Language Adaptation of Kabuki Jiten. Greenwood, 1979.

=== Women composers ===
- Cohen, Aaron I. International Encyclopedia of Women Composers. R.R. Bowker. 1981.

== Organizations ==
- American Association for State and Local History. Directory of historical organizations in the United States and Canada. AASLH Press, 1990–. ISSN 1045-456X.

== Parapsychology and the occult ==
- Berger, Arthur and Joyce. Encyclopedia of Parapsychology and Psychical Research. Paragon House, 1991.
- Bletzer, June. Donning International Encyclopedic Psychic Dictionary. Donning, 1986.
- Cavendish, Richard. Encyclopedia of the Unexplained. McGraw-Hill, 1974.
- Clark, Jerome. Encyclopedia of Strange and Unexplained Physical Phenomena. Gale Research, 1993.
- Cohen, Daniel. The Encyclopedia of Ghosts. Dodd, Mead, 1984; Avon, 1992.
- Drury, Nevill. Dictionary of Mysticism and the Esoteric Tradition. ABC-CLIO, 1992.
- Encyclopedia of Witchcraft and Demonology. Crown, 1959.
- Guiley, Rosemary Ellen. Encyclopedia of Dreams: Symbols and Interpretations. Crossroad, 1993.
- Guiley, Rosemary Ellen. The Encyclopedia of Ghosts and Spirits. Facts on File, 1992.
- Guiley, Rosemary Ellen. The Encyclopedia of Witches and Witchcraft. Facts on File, 1989.
- Guiley, Rosemary Ellen. Harper's Encyclopedia of Mystical & Paranormal Experience. HarperCollins, 1991.
- Haining, Peter. Encyclopedia of Ghost Lore. Prentice-Hall, 1984.
- Lasne, Sophie and Andre Gaultier. Dictionary of Superstitions. Prentice-Hall, 1984.
- Miller, Gustavus Hindman. The Dictionary of Dreams:10,000 Dreams Interpreted. 1901; Prentice-Hall, 1985.
- Opie, Iona & Moira Tatem. A Dictionary of Superstitions. Oxford University Press, 1989.
- Radford, Edwin and Mona. Encyclopedia of Superstitions. Philosophical Library, 1949; Greenwood, 1969.
- Shepherd, Leslie. Encyclopedia of Occultism & Parapsychology: A Compendium of Information on the Occult Sciences, Magic, Demonology, Superstitions, Spiritism, Mysticism, Metaphysics, Psychical Science, and Parapsychology, with Biographical and Bibliographical Notes and Comprehensive Indexes. 3rd ed., Gale Research, 1993.

=== Astrology ===
- Larousse Encyclopedia of Astrology. McGraw-Hill, 1980.
- Lewis, James R. Astrology Encyclopedia. Gale Research, 1993.
- Parker, Derek & Julia Parker. The New Complete Astrologer: The Practical Encyclopedia of Astrological Science. 21st century ed., Harmony, 1984.

== Philology ==
=== Philologists ===
- Biogaphisches Jahrbuch für Alterumskunde (in German). Berlin: Calvary. 1879–1898.
- Biogaphisches Jahrbuch für Alterumskunde (in German). Leipzig: Reisland. 1899–1944.

== Philosophy ==
- Ast, Friedrich (1835–1838). Lexicon Platonicum. Lipsiae: Weidmann.
- Audi, Robert. The Cambridge dictionary of philosophy. Cambridge University Press, 1999. ISBN 0-521-63136-X.
- Ayer, A. J., Jane O'Grady. A dictionary of philosophical quotations. Blackwell Publishers, 1992. ISBN 0-631-17015-4.
- Baldwin, James Mark (1901–1905). Dictionary of philosophy and psychology. New York: Macmillan.
- Barker, Chris. The Sage dictionary of cultural studies. Sage, 2004. ISBN 0-7619-7340-0.
- Blanc, Elie (1906). Dictionnaire de philosophie ancienne, moderne and contemporaine (in French). Paris: Lethielleux.
- Borchert, Donald M. Encyclopedia of philosophy. Macmillan Reference USA, 2005–. ISBN 0-02-865780-2.
- Brown, Stephen F., Juan Carlos Flores. Historical dictionary of medieval philosophy and theology. Scarecrow Press, 2007. ISBN 0-8108-5326-4.
- Bullock, Alan & Stephen Trombley. Harper Dictionary of Modern Thought. rev. ed., HarperCollins, 1988.
- Burr, John. Handbook of World Philosophy: Contemporary Developments since 1945. Greenwood, 1980.
- Craig, Edward. Routledge encyclopedia of philosophy. Routledge, 1998. ISBN 0-415-07310-3.
- Craig, Edward. The shorter Routledge encyclopedia of philosophy. Routledge, 2005. ISBN 0-415-32495-5.
- Dematteis, Philip Breed, Leemon B. McHenry. American philosophers, 1950–2000. Gale Group, 2003. ISBN 0-7876-6023-X.
- Edwards, Paul. Encyclopedia of Philosophy. Free Press, 1967, 1973.
- Edgar, Andrew, Peter R. Sedgwick. Key concepts in cultural theory. Routledge, 1999. ISBN 0-415-11403-9.
- Eisler, Rudolf (1922). Handworterbuch der Philosophie (in German). Berlin: Mittler.
- Eisler, Rudolf (1889). Worterbuch der philosophischen Begriffe (in German). Berlin: Mittler.
- Fieser, James, Bradley Harris Dowden. The Internet encyclopedia of philosophy. The Internet Encyclopedia of Philosophy (IEP), n. d. available here.
- Goulet, Richard. Dictionnaire des philosophes antiques. Editions du Centre national de la recherche scientifique, 1989–[2005]. ISBN 2-222-04042-6.
- Grrattan-Guinness, Ivor. Companion Encyclopedia of the History and Philosophy of the Mathematical Sciences. Routledge, 1993.
- Harrington, Austin, Barbara L. Marshall, Hans-Peter Müller. Encyclopedia of social theory. Routledge, 2006. ISBN 0-415-29046-5.
- Honderich, Ted. The Oxford companion to philosophy. Oxford University Press, 2005. ISBN 0-19-926479-1.
- Horowitz, Maryanne Cline. New dictionary of the history of ideas. Charles Scribner's Sons, 2005. ISBN 0-684-31377-4.
- Houdé, Olivier Daniel Kayser, Vivian Waltz, Christian Cav. Dictionary of cognitive science: Neuroscience, psychology, artificial intelligence, linguistics, and philosophy. Psychology Press, 2004. ISBN 1-57958-251-6.
- Iannone, A. Pablo. Dictionary of world philosophy. Routledge, 2001. ISBN 0-415-17995-5.
- Jacob, André. Encyclopédie philosophique universelle. Presses universitaires de France, 1989–1998. ISBN 2-13-041441-9.
- Kersey, Ethel M., Calvin O. Schrag. Women philosophers: a bio-critical source book. Greenwood Press, 1989. ISBN 0-313-25720-5.
- Kohl, Herbert. From Archetype to Zeitgeist: Powerful Ideas for Powerful Thinking. Little, Brown, 1992.
- Mander, W. J., Alan P. F. Sell. The dictionary of nineteenth-century British philosophers. Thoemmes, 2002. ISBN 1-85506-955-5.
- Mautner, Thomas. A dictionary of philosophy. Blackwell Publishers, 1996. ISBN 0-631-18459-7.
- Mora, José Ferrater Josep-Maria Terricabras. Diccionario de filosofía. Editorial Ariel, S.A., 1994. ISBN 84-344-0500-8.
- Payne, Michael. A dictionary of cultural and critical theory. Blackwell Reference, 1996. ISBN 0-631-17197-5.
- Peters, F. E. Greek philosophical terms: a historical lexicon. New York University Press, 1967.
- Ritter, Joachim, Karlfried Gründer, Gottfried Gabriel. Historisches Wörterbuch der Philosophie. Schwabe, 1971–[2004]. ISBN 3-7965-0115-X.
- Ritzer, George. Encyclopedia of social theory. Sage Publications, 2005. ISBN 0-7619-2611-9.
- Routledge encyclopedia of philosophy online: Version 2.0. Routledge, 2000. Available online here.
- Shook, John R., Richard T. Hull. The dictionary of modern American philosophers. Thoemmes Continuum, 2005. ISBN 1-84371-037-4.
- Wagman, Morton.Historical dictionary of quotations in cognitive science: A treasury of quotations in psychology, philosophy, and artificial intelligence. Greenwood Press, 2000. ISBN 0-313-31284-2.
- Wiener, Philip P. Dictionary of the History of Ideas: Studies of Selected Pivotal Ideas. Scribner's, 1968–73.
- Winch, Christopher, John Gingell. Philosophy of education: The key concepts. Routledge, 2008. ISBN 978-0-415-42892-7.
- Winquist, Charles E., Victor E. Taylor. Encyclopedia of postmodernism. Routledge, 2000. ISBN 0-415-15294-1.
- Zalta, Edward N., Center for the Study of Language and Information. Stanford encyclopedia of philosophy. Stanford University, 1995–. ISSN 1095-5054. Available online here.
- Zeyl, Donald J., Daniel Devereux, Phillip Mitsis. Encyclopedia of classical philosophy. Greenwood Press, 1997. ISBN 0-313-28775-9.

=== Aesthetics ===
- Cooper, David Edward. A companion to aesthetics. Blackwell Reference, 1992. ISBN 0-631-17801-5.
- Kelly, Michael. Encyclopedia of aesthetics. Oxford University Press, 1998. ISBN 0-19-511307-1.

=== Epistemology ===
- Dancy, Jonathan and Ernest Sosa. Companion to Epistemology. Blackwell, 1992.

=== Ethics ===
- Becker, Lawrence C. & Charlotte B. Becker. Encyclopedia of Ethics. Garland, 1992.
- Chadwick, Ruth F. Encyclopedia of applied ethics. Academic Press, 1998. ISBN 0-12-227065-7.
- Mitcham, Carl. Encyclopedia of science, technology, and ethics. Macmillan Reference USA, 2005. ISBN 0-02-865831-0.
- Roth, John K. Ethics. Salem Press, 2005. ISBN 1-58765-170-X.

==== Bioethics ====
- Post, Stephen Garrard. Encyclopedia of bioethics. Macmillan Reference USA, 2003. ISBN 0-02-865774-8.
- Reich, Warren T. Encyclopedia of Bioethics. Free Press, 1982.

===== Medical ethics =====
- Boyd, Kenneth M., Roger Higgs, A. J. Pinching. The new dictionary of medical ethics. BMJ Publ., 1997. ISBN 0-7279-1001-9.

==== Christian ethics ====
- Childress, James F. & John Macquarrie. The Westminster Dictionary of Christian Ethics. rev. ed., Westminster, 1986.
- Harrison, R. K. Encyclopedia of Biblical and Christian Ethics. rev. ed., Thomas Nelson, 1992.

==== Environmental ethics ====
- Caldicott, J. Baird, Robert Frodeman. Encyclopedia of environmental ethics and philosophy. Macmillan Reference USA, 2009. ISBN 978-0-02-866137-7.

=== History of philosophy ===
- Brown, Stephen F., Juan Carlos Flores. Historical dictionary of medieval philosophy and theology. Scarecrow Press, 2007. ISBN 0-8108-5326-4.
- Gracia, Jorge J. E., Timothy B. Noone. A companion to philosophy in the Middle Ages. Blackwell, 2003. ISBN 0-631-21672-3.
- Kors, Alan Charles. Encyclopedia of the Enlightenment. Oxford University Press, 2005–. ISBN 0-19-518761-X. Available online here.

=== Metaphysics ===
- Burckhardt, Hans, Barry Smith. Handbook of metaphysics and ontology. Philosophia Verlag, 1991. ISBN 3-88405-080-X.
- Kim, Jaegwon, Ernest Sosa, Gary S. Rosenkrantz. A companion to metaphysics. Wiley-Blackwell, 2009. ISBN 978-1-4051-5298-3.

=== Ontology ===
- Burckhardt, Hans, Barry Smith. Handbook of metaphysics and ontology. Philosophia Verlag, 1991. ISBN 3-88405-080-X.

=== Philosophers ===
- Brown, Stuart C., Diané Collinson, Robert Wilkinson. Biographical dictionary of twentieth-century philosophers. Routledge, 1996. ISBN 0-415-06043-5.
- Hackett, Jeremiah. Medieval philosophers. Gale Research, 1992. ISBN 0-8103-7592-3.
- Kersey, Ethel M., Calvin O. Schrag. Women philosophers: a bio-critical source book. Greenwood Press, 1989. ISBN 0-313-25720-5.
- Martinich, Aloysius, David Sosa. A companion to analytic philosophy. Blackwell, 2001. ISBN 0-631-21415-1.
- Yolton, John W., John Valdimir Price, J. N. Stephens. The dictionary of eighteenth-century British philosophers. Thoemmes, 1999. ISBN 1-85506-123-6.

=== Philosophy by region ===
==== African philosophy ====
- Wiredu, Kwasi, W. E. Abraham, Abiola Irele. A companion to African philosophy. Blackwell, 2004. ISBN 0-631-20751-1.

==== American philosophy ====
- Lachs, John, Robert B. Talisse. American philosophy: an encyclopedia. Routledge, 2007.

===== American philosophers =====
- Dematteis, Philip Breed, Leemon B. McHenry. American philosophers, 1950–2000. Gale Group, 2003. ISBN 0-7876-6023-X.
- Shook, John R. The dictionary of early American philosophers. Continuum, 2012. ISBN 978-1-84371-182-7.
- Shook, John R., Richard T. Hull. The dictionary of modern American philosophers. Thoemmes Continuum, 2005. ISBN 1-84371-037-4.

==== Asian philosophy ====
- Carr, Brain, Indira Mahalingan. Companion encyclopedia of Asian philosophy. Routledge, 1997. ISBN 0-415-03535-X.
- Cua, A. S. Encyclopedia of Chinese philosophy. Routledge, 2003. ISBN 0-415-93913-5.
- Leaman, Oliver. Encyclopedia of Asian philosophy. Routledge, 2001. ISBN 0-415-17281-0.
- Potter, Karl H. The encyclopedia of Indian philosophies. Motilal Banarsidass, 1970–[2006]. ISBN 81-208-0307-8.

==== British philosophy ====
- Grayling, A. C., Andrew Pyle, Naomi Goulder, Stuart Brown, Isabel Iribarren. The Continuum encyclopedia of British philosophy. Thoemmes Continuum, 2006. ISBN 1-84371-141-9.

===== British philosophers =====
- Brown, Stuart C., Hugh Bredin. The dictionary of twentieth-century British philosophers. Thoemmes Continuum, 2005. ISBN 1-84371-096-X.
- Mander, W. J., Alan P. F. Sell. The dictionary of nineteenth-century British philosophers. Thoemmes, 2002. ISBN 1-85506-955-5.
- Pyle, Andrew. The dictionary of seventeenth-century British philosophers. Thoemmes Press, 2000. ISBN 1-85506-704-8.

==== Continental philosophy ====
- Critchley, Simon, William Ralph Schroeder. A companion to continental philosophy. Blackwell, 1998. ISBN 0-631-19013-9.
- Glendinning, Simon. The Edinburgh Encyclopedia of Continental philosophy. University Press, 1999. ISBN 0-7486-0783-8.

=== Philosophy by school ===
==== Cartesian philosophy ====
- Ariew, Roger. Historical dictionary of Descartes and Cartesian philosophy. Scarecrow Press, 2003. ISBN 0-8108-4833-3.

==== Feminist philosophy ====
- Jaggar, Alison M., Iris Marion Young. A companion to feminist philosophy. Blackwell, 1998. ISBN 1-55786-659-7.

==== Hegelian philosophy ====
- Burbridge, John W. Historical dictionary of Hegelian philosophy. Scarecrow Press, 2001. ISBN 0-8108-3878-8.

==== Heidegger's philosophy ====
- Denker, Alfred. Historical dictionary of Heidegger's philosophy. Scarecrow Press, 2000. ISBN 0-8108-3737-4.

==== Kantian philosophy ====
- Holzhey, Helmut, Vilem Murdoch. Historical dictionary of Kant and Kantianism. Scarecrow Press, 2005. ISBN 0-8108-5390-6.

==== Kierkegaard's philosophy ====
- Watkin, Julia. Historical dictionary of Kierkegaard's philosophy. Scarecrow Press, 2001. ISBN 0-8108-3817-6.

==== Nietzschean philosophy ====
- Diethe, Carol. Historical dictionary of Nietzscheanism. Scarecrow Press, 2007. ISBN 0-8108-5613-1.

==== Wittgenstein's philosophy ====
- Richter, Duncan. Historical dictionary of Wittgenstein's philosophy. Scarecrow Press, 2004. ISBN 0-8108-5059-1.

=== Philosophy of mind ===
- Gregory, R. L., O. L. Zangwill. The Oxford companion to the mind. Oxford University Press, 1987. ISBN 0-19-866124-X.
- Guttenplan, Samuel D. A companion to the philosophy of mind. Blackwell Reference, 1994. ISBN 0-631-17953-4.

=== Philosophy of religion ===
- MacGregor, Geddes.Dictionary of religion and philosophy. Paragon House, 1989. ISBN 1-55778-019-6.
- Quinn, Philip L., Charles Taliaferro. A companion to the philosophy of religion. Blackwell, 1997. ISBN 0-631-19153-4.
- Russell, Letty M., J. Shannon Clarkson. Dictionary of feminist theologies. Westminster John Knox Press, 1996. ISBN 0-664-22058-4.
- Thiselton, Anthony C. A concise encyclopedia of the philosophy of religion. Baker Academic, 2005. ISBN 0-8010-3120-6.
- Verkamp, Bernard J. Encyclopedia of philosophers on religion. McFarland, 2008. ISBN 978-0-7864-3286-8.

==== Christian philosophy ====
- Fitzgerald, Allan, John C. Cavadini. Augustine through the ages: An encyclopedia. W.B. Eerdmans, 1999. ISBN 0-8028-3843-X.
- Hill, Daniel J., Randal D. Rauser. Christian philosophy A–Z. Edinburgh University Press, 2006. ISBN 0-7486-2212-8.

==== Islamic philosophy ====
===== Islamic philosophers =====
- Leaman, Oliver. The biographical encyclopedia of Islamic philosophy. Thoemmes Continuum, 2006. ISBN 1-84371-148-6.

=== Philosophy of science ===
- Bynum, W. F., E. J. Browne, Ray Porter. Dictionary of the history of science. Princeton University Press, 1981. ISBN 0-691-08287-1.
- Durbin, Paul. Dictionary of Concepts in the Philosophy of Science. Greenwood, 1988.
- Newton-Smith, W. A companion to the philosophy of science. Blackwell, 2000. ISBN 0-631-17024-3.
- Sarkar, Sahotra, Jessica Pfeifer. The philosophy of science: an encyclopedia. Routledge, 2006. ISBN 978-0-415-93927-0.

=== Political philosophy ===
- Benewick, Robert, Philip Green. The Routledge dictionary of twentieth-century political thinkers. Routledge, 1998. ISBN 0-415-15881-8.
- Miller, David, Janet Coleman, William Connolly. The Blackwell encyclopaedia of political thought. B. Blackwell, 1987. ISBN 0-631-14011-5.

=== Pragmatism ===
- Shook, John R., Joseph Margolis. A companion to pragmatism. Blackwell, 2006. ISBN 1-4051-1621-8.

== Science and technology ==
- AccessScience: The McGraw-Hill encyclopedia of science and technology on the Web. McGraw-Hill, 2000–. ISSN 1097-8542. Available online here.
- Asimov, Isaac. Asimov's New Guide to Science. Basic Books, 1994.
- Bailey, Martha J. American women in science: a biographical dictionary. ABC-CLIO, 1994. ISBN 0-87436-740-9.
- Bailey, Martha J. American women in science: 1950 to the present: a biographical dictionary. ABC-CLIO, 1998. ISBN 0-87436-921-5.
- Blackburn, David and Geoffrey Holister. G. K. Hall Encyclopedia of Modern Technology. G.K. Hall, 1987.
- Brennan, Richard. Dictionary of Scientific Literacy. Wiley, 1991.
- Bunch, Bryan. The Henry Holt Handbook of Current Science & Technology: A Sourcebook of Facts and Analysis Covering the Most Important Events in Science and Technology. Holt, 1992.
- Cohen, I. Bernard. Album of Science. Scribner's, 1978–1989.
- Considine, Douglas M. Van Nostrand Reinhold Encyclopedia of Chemistry. 4th ed., Van Nostrand, 1984.
- Considine, Douglas M. & Glenn D. Considine. Van Nostrand's Science Encyclopedia. 7th ed., Van Nostrand, 1989.
- Cotterill, Rodney. The Cambridge Guide to the Material World. Cambridge University Press, 1984.
- Dorling Kindersley Science Encyclopedia. Dorling Kindersley, 1993.
- Gillespie, Charles Coulston, Frederic Lawrence Holmes. Dictionary of scientific biography. Scribner, 1980–1990. ISBN 0-684-16962-2.
- Golob, Richard and Eric Brus. Almanac of Science and Technology: What's New and What's Known. Harcourt Brace, 1990.
- Grolier Encyclopedia of Science and Technology. Grolier, 1993.
- Haven, Kendall F., Donna Clark. 100 most popular scientists for young adults: biographical sketches and professional paths. Libraries Unlimited, 1999. ISBN 1-56308-674-3.
- Headlam, Catherine. The Kingfisher Science Encyclopedia. CKG Publishers, 1993.
- Hunt, Candida & Monica Byles. The Encyclopedic Dictionary of Science. Facts on File, 1988.
- Kalte, Pam M., Katherine H. Nemeh, Noah Schusterbauer. American men and women of science: A biographical directory of today's leaders in physical, biological, and related sciences. Thomson Gale, 2005. ISBN 1-4144-0462-X. Available online here.
- Kessler, James H. Distinguished African-American scientists of the 20th century. Oryx Press, 1996. ISBN 0-89774-955-3.
- Knight, David. Companion to the Physical Sciences. Routledge, 1989.
- Macmillan Encyclopedia of Science. Macmillan, 1991.
- Marquis Who's Who. Who's who in science and technology. Marquis Who's Who, 1992–.
- McGraw-Hill Book Company (2002). McGraw-Hill encyclopedia of science and technology. McGraw-Hill. ISBN 978-0-07-913665-7.. Subscription-based online access is available.
- Meyers, Robert A. Encyclopedia of Physical Science and Technology. 2nd ed., Academic Press, 1992.
- Mitcham, Carl. Encyclopedia of science, technology, and ethics. Macmillan Reference USA, 2005. ISBN 0-02-865831-0.
- National Academy of Sciences. Biographical memoirs of the national academy of sciences. Available online here.
- The New Book of Popular Science. rev. ed., Grolier, 1992.
- Nybakken, James Willard, William W. Broenkow, T. L. Vallier. Interdisciplinary encyclopedia of marine sciences. Grolier Academic Reference, 2003. ISBN 0-7172-5946-3.
- Ogilvie, Marilyn; Harvey, Joy (2000). The Biographical Dictionary of Women in Science: Pioneering Lives From Ancient Times to the Mid-20th Century. Taylor & Francis US. ISBN 978-0-415-92038-4.
- Parker, Sybil P. McGraw-Hill Concise Encyclopedia of Science and Technology. 3rd ed., McGraw-Hill, 1994.
- Parker, Sybil P. McGraw-Hill Encyclopedia of Science and Technology. 7th ed., McGraw-Hill, 1992.
- Porter, Roy, Marilyn Bailey Ogilvie. The biographical dictionary of scientists. Oxford University Press, 2000. ISBN 0-19-521663-6.
- The Raintree Illustrated Science Encyclopedia. 3rd ed., Raintree/Streck-Vaughn, 1991.
- Smelser, Neil J; Baltes, Paul B, ed. (2001): International Encyclopedia of the Social & Behavioral Sciences, 26 volumes, Oxford: Elsevier. Contains 4,000 articles on a wide range of subjects. ISBN 978-0-08-043076-8. Various subscription-based online access facilities available.
- The Way Nature Works. Macmillan, 1992.
- Webster, Raymond B. African American firsts in science and technology. Gale Group, 1999. ISBN 0-7876-3876-5.
- World Book Encyclopedia of Science. World Book, 1990.
- Yule, John D. The Concise Encyclopedia of Science & Technology. Phaidon Press, 1978.

=== Chemistry ===
- Atwood, J. L., Jonathan W. Steed. Encyclopedia of supramolecular chemistry. M. Dekker, 2004. ISBN 0-8247-5056-X.
- Bretherick, L., P. G. Urben. Bretherick's handbook of reactive chemical hazards: An indexed guide to published data. Academic Press, 2006. ISBN 0-12-372563-1.
- CRC Handbook of Chemistry and Physics. Chemical Rubber Company, 1913–.
- Chapman and Hall/CRC Press. CHEMnetBASE: Chemical databases online. Chapman and Hall/CRC Press, 1999–. .
- Concise Encyclopedia of Polymer Science and Engineering. Wiley-Interscience, 1990.
- Considine, Douglas M. Van Nostrand Reinhold Encyclopedia of Chemistry. Wiley Interscience, 2005. ISBN 0-471-61525-0.
- Dean, John A. Lange's Handbook of Chemistry. McGraw-Hill, 1992.
- Emsley, John. The elements. Oxford: Clarendon Press; Oxford University Press, 1998. ISBN 0-19-855819-8.
- Farber, Eduard. Great chemists. Interscience, 1961.
- Gerhartz, Wolfgang. Ullmann's Encyclopedia of Industrial Chemistry. 5th ed., VCH, 1985–.
- Inczedy, J. T. Lengyel, A. M. Ure. Compendium of analytical nomenclature: Definitive rules 1997. International Union of Pure and Applied Chemistry, 2002. ISBN 0-86542-615-5. .
- Kalte, Pam M., Katherine H. Nemeh, Noah Schusterbauer. American men and women of science: A biographical directory of today's leaders in physical, biological, and related sciences. Thomson Gale, 2005. ISBN 1-4144-0462-X. .
- King, R. Bruce. Encyclopedia of inorganic chemistry. Wiley, 2005. ISBN 978-0-470-86078-6.
- Kirk-Othmer Concise Encyclopedia of Chemical Technology. Wiley-Interscience, 1985.
- Kirk, Raymond E., Donald F. Othmer. Kirk-Othmer Encyclopedia of Chemical Technology. Wiley-Interscience, 1985.
- Kroshwitz, Jacqueline I. Encyclopedia of Polymer Science and Engineering. 2nd ed., Wiley-Interscience, 1985–90.
- Kroshwitz, Jacqueline I. and Mary Howe-Grant. Kirk-Othmer Encyclopedia of Chemical Technology. 4th ed., Wiley-Interscience, 1991–.
- Lagowski, J. J. Chemistry: Foundations and applications. Macmillan Reference USA, 2004. ISBN 0-02-865721-7.
- Leroy, Francis. A century of Nobel prize recipients: Chemistry, physics, and medicine. Marcel Dekker, 2003. ISBN 0-8247-0876-8.
- Lindon, John C., George E. Tranter, John L. Holmes. 1.Encyclopedia of spectroscopy and spectrometry. Academic Press, 2000. ISBN 0-12-226681-1. .
- Mackay, Donald, Wan Ying Shiu, Kuo-Ching Ma. Handbook of physical-chemical properties and environmental fate for organic chemicals. CRC/Taylor and Francis, 2006. ISBN 1-56670-687-4.
- McKetta, John J. & William A. Cunningham. Encyclopedia of Chemical Processing and Design. Marcel Dekker, 1976–.
- Meyers, Robert A. Encyclopedia of analytical chemistry: Applications, theory, and instrumentation. Wiley, 2000. ISBN 0-471-97670-9.
- Miles, Wyndham D., Robert F. Gould. American chemists and chemical engineers. American Chemical Society, 1976–1994. ISBN 0-8412-0278-8.
- O'Neill, Maryadele J., Patricia E. Heckelman, Peter H. Dobbelaar, Kristin J. Roman, Catherine M. Kenny, Linda S. Karaffa, Royal Society of Chemistry (Great Britain). Merck Index Online. Royal Society of Chemistry. ISBN 978-1-84973-670-1. .
- Paquette, Leo A. Encyclopedia of reagents for organic synthesis. Wiley, 1995. ISBN 0-471-93623-5.
- Parker, Sybil P. McGraw-Hill Encyclopedia of Chemistry. 2nd ed., McGraw-Hill, 1993.
- Parker, Sybil P. McGraw-Hill Encyclopedia of Science and Technology. 7th ed., McGraw-Hill, 1992.
- Rayner-Canam, Marelene F., Geoffrey Rayner-Canham. Women in chemistry: Their changing roles from alchemical times to the mid-twentieth century. American Chemical Society; Chemical Heritage Foundation, 1998. ISBN 0-8412-3522-8.
- Rogers, David, Royal Society of Chemistry. Nobel laureate contributions to 20th century chemistry. Royal Society of Chemistry, 2006. ISBN 0-85404-356-X.
- Ulický, Ladislav, T. J. Kemp. Comprehensive dictionary of physical chemistry. E. Horwood; PTR Prentice Hall, 1992. ISBN 0-13-151747-3.
- Ullmann, Fritz. Ullmann's encyclopedia of industrial chemistry. Wiley-VCH; J. Wiley & Sons, 2005–..
- Winter, Mark J. WebElements periodic table. University of Sheffield; WebElements, 1993–. .
- Worsfold, Paul, A. Townshend, C. F. Poole. Encyclopedia of analytical science. Elsevier Academic Press, 2005. ISBN 0-12-764100-9.

==== Biochemistry ====
- Scott, Thomas A. & Mary Brewer. Concise Encyclopedia of Biochemistry. Walter de Gruyter, 2nd ed., 1988.

=== Cognitive science ===
- Houdé, Olivier Daniel Kayser, Vivian Waltz, Christian Cav. Dictionary of cognitive science: Neuroscience, psychology, artificial intelligence, linguistics, and philosophy. Psychology Press, 2004. ISBN 1-57958-251-6.
- Nadel, Lynn. Encyclopedia of cognitive science. John Wiley, 2005. ISBN 0-470-01619-1.
- Wagman, Morton.Historical dictionary of quotations in cognitive science: A treasury of quotations in psychology, philosophy, and artificial intelligence. Greenwood Press, 2000. ISBN 0-313-31284-2.
- Wilson, Robert W., Frank C. Keil. The MIT encyclopedia of the cognitive sciences. MIT Press, 1999. ISBN 0-262-23200-6.

=== Computer and electronic sciences ===
- Birnes, William J. McGraw-Hill Personal Computer Programming Encyclopedia: Language and Operating Systems. 2nd ed., McGraw-Hill, 1989.
- Bitter, Gary G. Macmillan Encyclopedia of Computers. Macmillan, 1992.
- Concise International Encyclopedia of Robotics. Wiley, 1990.
- Dorf, Richard C. International Encyclopedia of Robotics: Applications and Automation. Wiley, 1988.
- Douglas-Young, John. Illustrated Encyclopedic Dictionary of Electronic Circuits. Prentice-Hall, 1983.
- Edmunds, Robert A. The Prentice-Hall Encyclopedia of Information Technology. Prentice-Hall, 1987.
- Gibilison, Stan and Neil Sclater. Encyclopedia of Electronics. 2nd ed., TAB Books, 1990.
- Graf, Rudolf F. The Encyclopedia of Electronic Circuits. TAB Books, 1985–1994.
- Henderson, Harry. A to Z of computer scientists. Facts on File, 2003. ISBN 0-8160-4531-3.
- Lee, John A. N. Computer pioneers. IEEE Computer Society Press, 1995. ISBN 0-8186-6357-X.
- Meyers, Robert A. Encyclopedia of Telecommunications. Academic Press, 1988.
- Morgan, Christopher. Wizards and their wonders: Portraits in computing. Association for Computing Machinery Press, 1997. ISBN 0-89791-960-2.
- Parker, Sybil P. McGraw-Hill Encyclopedia of Electronics and Computers. 2nd ed., McGraw-Hill, 1988.
- Parker, Sybil P., ed. McGraw-Hill Encyclopedia of Science and Technology. 7th ed., McGraw-Hill, 1992.
- Ralston, Anthony and Edwin D. Reilly. Encyclopedia of Computer Science. 3rd ed., Van Nostrand, 1993.
- Stokes, Adrian. Concise Encyclopedia of Information Technology. Prentice-Hall, 1983.

==== Artificial intelligence ====
- Houdé, Olivier Daniel Kayser, Vivian Waltz, Christian Cav. Dictionary of cognitive science: Neuroscience, psychology, artificial intelligence, linguistics, and philosophy. Psychology Press, 2004. ISBN 1-57958-251-6.
- Shapiro, Stuart C. Encyclopedia of Artificial Intelligence. 2nd ed., Wiley, 1992.
- Wagman, Morton.Historical dictionary of quotations in cognitive science: A treasury of quotations in psychology, philosophy, and artificial intelligence. Greenwood Press, 2000. ISBN 0-313-31284-2.

=== Earth sciences and environment ===
- Alexander, David E.; Fairbridge, Rhodes Whitmore (1999). Encyclopedia Of Environmental Science. Springer. ISBN 978-0-412-74050-3.
- Ashworth, William. The Encyclopedia of Environmental Studies. Facts on File, 1991.
- Becher, Anne, Joseph Richey. American environmental leaders: From colonial times to the present. Grey House, 2008. ISBN 978-1-59237-119-8.
- Britton, Gabriel. Encyclopedia of environmental microbiology. Wiley, 2002. ISBN 0-471-35450-3.
- Cevasco, G. A., Richard P. Harmond. Modern American environmentalists: A biographical encyclopedia. Johns Hopkins University Press, c2009. ISBN 978-0-8018-9152-6.
- Cheremisinoff, Paul N. Encyclopedia of Environmental Control Technology. Gulk Publishing, 1989–.
- Chesworth, Ward (2007). Encyclopedia of Soil Science. Springer. p. 197. ISBN 978-1-4020-3994-2.
- Fairbridge, Rhodes W. Encyclopedia of Earth Sciences. Van Nostrand, 1966–.
- Gates, Alexander E. A to Z of earth scientists. Facts on File, 2002. ISBN 0-8160-4580-1.
- Goudie, Andrew, David J. Cuff. Encyclopedia of global change: Environmental change and human society. Oxford University Press, 2002. ISBN 0-19-510825-6.
- Granck, Irene and David Brownstone. Green Encyclopedia. Prentice Hall, 1992.
- Hillel, Daniel and Jerry L. Hatfield. Encyclopedia of soils in the environment. Elsevier/Academic Press, 2005. ISBN 0-12-348530-4.
- Holton, James R., Judith A. Curry, J. A. Pyle. Encyclopedia of atmospheric sciences. Academic Press, 2003. ISBN 0-12-227090-8.
- Hosansky, David. The environment A to Z. CQ Press, 2001. ISBN 1-56802-583-1.
- Howard, Philip H. Hearth Taub Printup. Handbook of environmental degradation rates. Lewis, 1991. ISBN 0-87371-358-3.
- Jawadekar, N. (2007). Encyclopedia of Environmental Science. SBS Publishers & Distributors. ISBN 978-81-89741-51-8.
- Kusky, Timothy M.; Cullen, Katherine E. (2010). Encyclopedia of Earth and Space Science. Infobase Publishing. ISBN 978-1-4381-2859-7.
- Lal, R. Encyclopedia of soil science. Taylor & Francis, 2006. ISBN 0-8493-5053-0.
- McGraw-Hill Book Company (1980). McGraw-Hill encyclopedia of environmental science. McGraw-Hill Books Co. ISBN 978-0-07-045264-0.
- McGraw-Hill Encyclopedia of Environmental Sciences. 2nd ed., McGraw-Hill, 1980.
- McGraw-Hill (2005). McGraw-Hill concise encyclopedia of environmental science. McGraw-Hill. ISBN 978-0-07-143951-0.
- McGraw-Hill Encyclopedia of Environmental Science & Engineering. McGraw-Hill, 1993.
- Mongillo, John F.; Zierdt-Warshaw, Linda (2000). Encyclopedia of Environmental Science. University Rochester Press. ISBN 978-1-57356-147-1.
- Munn, R. E. Encyclopedia of global environmental change. Wiley, 2002. ISBN 0-471-97796-9.
- Nierenberg, William A. Encyclopedia of Earth System Science. Academic Press, 1992.
- Niergenberg, William Aaron, Edward O. Wilson, Peter H. Raven. Encyclopedia of environmental biology. Academic Press, 1995. ISBN 0-12-226730-3.
- Parker, Sybil P.; Corbitt, Robert A.; inc, McGraw-Hill (1993). McGraw-Hill encyclopedia of environmental science & engineering. McGraw-Hill. ISBN 978-0-07-051396-9.
- Parker, Sybil P. McGraw-Hill Encyclopedia of the Geological Sciences. 2nd ed., McGraw-Hill, 1988.
- Pfafflin, James R.; Ziegler, Edward N. (2006). Encyclopedia of Environmental Science and Engineering, Fifth Edition, Volumes One and Two. CRC Press. ISBN 978-0-8493-9843-8.
- Pinna, Giovanni. The Illustrated Encyclopedia of Fossils. Facts on File, 1990.
- Polunin, Nicholas, Lynn M. Curme. World who is who and does what in environment and conservation. St. Martin's Press; Foundation for Environmental Conservation, 1997. ISBN 0-312-17448-9.
- Smith, David G. Cambridge Encyclopedia of Earth Sciences. Cambridge, 1982.
- Sterling, Keir B. Biographical dictionary of American and Canadian naturalists and environmentalists. Greenwood Press, 1997. ISBN 0-313-23047-1.
- Venable, Shannon L. Gold: a cultural encyclopedia. ABC-CLIO, 2011. ISBN 978-0-313-38430-1.
- West, Jim. International Petroleum Encyclopedia. PennWell Boos, 1967.

==== Materials science ====
- Bever, Michael B. Encyclopedia of Materials Science and Engineering. Pergamon Press, 1986.

==== Minerals and gemstones ====
- Arem, Joel. Color Encyclopedia of Gemstones. 2nd ed., Van Nostrand, 1987.
- Carr, Donald D. and Norman Herz. Concise Encyclopedia of Mineral Resources. Pergamon Press, 1989.
- Dana's Manual of Mineralogy. 20th ed., Wiley, 1985.
- Holden, Martin. The Encyclopedia of Gemstones and Minerals. Facts on File, 1991.
- Larousse Encyclopedia of Precious Gems. Van Nostrand, 1992.
- O'Donoghue, Michael. VNR Color Dictionary of Minerals and Gemstones. Van Nostrand, 1982.
- Roberts, Willard L. and others. Encyclopedia of Minerals. 2nd ed., Van Nostrand, 1990.

=== Engineering and building construction ===
- Avallone, Eugene A. & Theodore Baumeister. Marks' Standard Handbook for Mechanical Engineers. 9th ed., McGraw-Hill, 1987.
- Bever, Michael B. Encyclopedia of Materials Science and Engineering. Pergamon Press, 1986.
- Brady, George S. and Henry R. Clauser. Materials Handbook: An Encyclopedia for Managers, Technical Professionals, Purchasing and Production Managers, Technicians, Supervisors, and Foremen. 13th ed., McGraw-Hill, 1991.
- Brooks, Hugh. Encyclopedia of Building and Construction Terms. Prentice-Hall, 1983.
- Carr, Donald D. and Norman Herz. Concise Encyclopedia of Mineral Resources. Pergamon Press, 1989.
- Cheremisinoff, Nicholas P. Encyclopedia of Fluid Mechanics. Gulf Publishing, 1986–93.
- Concise Encyclopedia of Building & Construction Materials. MIT Press & Pergamon Press, 1990.
- Concise Encyclopedia of Composite Materials. Pergamon Press, 1989.
- Concise Encyclopedia of Medical & Dental Materials. Pergamon Press, 1990.
- Cowan, Henry J. Encyclopedia of Building Technology. Prentice-Hall, 1988.
- Kroshwitz, Jacqueline I. and Mary Howe-Grant. Kirk-Othmer Encyclopedia of Chemical Technology. 4th ed., Wiley-Interscience, 1991–.
- Maxwell, W. H. and J. T. Brown, eds. Encyclopædia of municipal and sanitary engineering. Constable, 1910.
- National Academy of Engineering (U.S.). Memorial tributes. National Academy of Engineering, 1979–. ISSN 1075-8844.
- Oberg, Erik and Richard Green. Machnery's Handbook: A Reference Book for the Mechanical Engineer, Draftsman, Toolmaker, and Machinist. 24th ed., Industrial Press, 1992.
- Parker, Sybil P. McGraw-Hill Encyclopedia of Engineering. 2nd ed., McGraw-Hill, 1993.
- Parker, Sybil P. McGraw-Hill Encyclopedia of Science and Technology. 2nd ed., McGraw-Hill, 1993.
- Reader's Digest Book of Skills & Tools. Reader's Digest Association, 1993.
- Radford, William A., Johnson, Alfred Sidney. Radford's Cyclopedia of Cement Construction. Radford Publishing Company, 1910.
- Roysdon, Christine, Linda A. Khatri. American engineers of the nineteenth century: A biographical index. Garland, 1978. ISBN 0-8240-9827-7.
- Singh, Madan G. Systems and Control Encyclopedia: Theory, Technology, Applications. Pergamon Press, 1987.
- Turner, Roland, Steven L. Goulden, Barbara Sheridan. Great engineers and pioneers in technology. St. Martin's Press, 1981–. ISBN 0-312-34574-7.

==== Cleaning ====
- Aslett, Don. Cleaning Encyclopedia. Dell, 1993.
- Heloise from A to Z. Putnam, 1992.
- Moore, Alma C. How to Clean Everything: An Encyclopedia of What to Use and How to Use It. 3rd ed., Simon & Schuster, 1980.
- Pinkham, Mary Ellen and Dale Berg. Mary Ellen's Clean House! The All-in-One-Place Encyclopedia of Contemporary Housekeeping. Crown, 1993.

==== Do-it-yourself ====
- Complete Handyman Do-It-Yourself Encyclopedia. Rev. ed., H. S. Stuttman, 1983.
- Popular Mechanics Do-It-Yourself Encyclopedia. Rev. ed., Hearst Books, 1978.
- Reader's Digest New Complete Do-It-Yourself Manual. Rev. ed., Reader's Digest Association, 1991.

==== Metalworking ====
- Tottle, C. R. An Encyclopedia of Metallurgy and Meterials. Macdonald & Evans, 1984.

==== Woodworking ====
- Blackburn, Graham. Illustrated Encyclopedia of Woodworking Handtools, Instruments & Devices. Rev. ed., Globe Pequot Press, 1992.
- Concise Encyclopedia of Wood & Wood-Based Materials. Pergamon Press, 1989.
- Salaman, R. A., rev. by Philip Walker. Dictionary of Woodworking Tools c. 1700–1970 and Tools of Allied Trades. Rev. ed., Taunton Press, 1990.
- Taylor, Vic. Woodworker's Dictionary. Storey Communications, 1991.

=== History of science ===
- Asimov, Isaac. Asimov's Chronology of Science and Discovery. HarperCollins, 1989.
- Bynum, W. F., E. J. Browne, Ray Porter. Dictionary of the history of science. Princeton University Press, 1981. ISBN 0-691-08287-1.
- Gascoigne, Robert Mortimer. Chronology of the History of Science, 1450–1900. Garland, 1987.
- Hellemans, Alexander and Bryan Bunch. Timetables of Science: A Chronology of the Most Important People and Events in the History of Science. Simon & Schuster, 1988.
- History of Science and Technology: A Narrative Chronology. Facts on File, 1988.
- McNeil, Ian. An Encyclopedia of the History of Technology. Routledge, 1990.
- Mount, Ellis and Barbara List. Milestones in Science and Technology: The Ready Reference Guide to Discoveries, Inventions, and Facts. 2nd ed., Oryx, 1993.
- Parkinson, Claire. Breakthroughs: A Chronology of Great Achievements in Science and Mathematics, 1200–1930. G.K. Hall, 1985.

=== Philosophy of science ===
- Durbin, Paul. Dictionary of Concepts in the Philosophy of Science. Greenwood, 1988.

=== Physics ===
- Besançon, Robert M. The Encyclopedia of Physics. 3rd ed., Van Nostrand, 1985.
- CRC Handbook of Chemistry and Physics. Chemical Rubber Company, 1913–.
- Elert, Glenn, ed. (2009). The Physics Factbook: An Encyclopedia of Scientific Essays.
- Lerner, Rita G. & George L. Trigg. Encyclopedia of Physics. 2nd ed., VCH Publishers, 1991.
- Leroy, Francis. A century of Nobel prize recipients: Chemistry, physics, and medicine. Marcel Dekker, 2003. ISBN 0-8247-0876-8.
- McAinish, T. F. Physics in Medicine & Biology Encyclopedia. Pergamon Press, 1986.
- Meyers, Robert A. Encyclopedia of Lasers and Optical Technology. Academic Press, 1991.
- Meyers, Robert A. Encyclopedia of Modern Physics. Academic Press, 1990.
- Meyers, Robert A. Encyclopedia of Physical Science and Technology. 2nd ed., Academic Press, 1992.
- Parker, Sybil. McGraw-Hill Encyclopedia of Physics. 2nd ed., McGraw-Hill, 1993.
- Thewlis, James. Encyclopedic Dictionary of Physics. Pergamon, 1961–75.
- Trigg, George L. Encyclopedia of Applied Physics. VCH Publishers, 1991–.

=== Science and religion ===
- Ecker, Ronald L. Dictionary of Science and Creationism. Prometheus Books, 1990.
- van Huyssteen, Wentzel. Encyclopedia of science and religion. Macmillan Reference, 2003. ISBN 0-02-865704-7.

=== Technology ===
==== Transportation ====
- Papageorgiou, Markos. Concise Encyclopedia of Traffic and Transportation. Pergamon Press, 1991.
- Rand-McNally Encyclopedia of Transportation. Rand McNally, 1976.
- Silver Burdett Encyclopedia of Transport. Silver Burdett, 1983.
- Singh, Madan G. Systems and Control Encyclopedia: Theory, Technology, Applications. Pergamon Press, 1987.

===== Automobiles =====
- 50 Years of American Automobiles, 1939–1989. Publications International, 1989.
- Georgano, G. N. The New Encyclopedia of Motor Cars, 1885 to the Present. Dutton, 1982.
- Moloney, James H. & George H. Dammann. Encyclopedia of American Cars, 1930–1942. Crestline Publishing, 1977.
- Moloney, James H. & George H. Dammann. Encyclopedia of American Cars, 1946–1959. Crestline Publishing, 1980.
- Standard Catalog of American Cars. Krause, 1989.

===== Aviation =====
- Angelucci, Enzo. World Encyclopedia of Civil Aircraft: From Leonardo da Vinci to the Present. Crown, 1982.
- Encyclopedia of Aviation. Scribner's, 1977.
- Garrison, Paul. The Illustrated Encyclopedia of General Aviation. TAB Books, 1990.
- Illustrated Encyclopedia of Aviation. Marshall Cavendish, 1979.
- Jane's All the World's Aircraft. Jane's Publishing, 1912–.
- Mondey, David. The International Encyclopedia of Aviation. Crown, 1988.
- Polking, Kirk. Private Pilot's Dictionary and Handbook. Arco, 1986.
- Rand McNally Encyclopedia of Military Aircraft, 1914–80. Rand McNally, 1983.

===== Railroads =====
- Drury, George H. Historical Guide to North American Railroads. Kalmbach Publishing, 1985.
- Drury, George H. Train-Watcher's Guide to North American Railroads. Kalmbach Publishing, 1984.
- Hubbard, Freeman. Encyclopedia of North American Railroading: 150 Years of Railroading in the United States and Canada. McGraw-Hill, 1981.

===== Ships =====
- Kemp, Peter. Encyclopedia of Ships and Seafaring. Crown, 1980.
- Kemp, Peter. The Oxford Companion to Ships and the Sea. Oxford Univ. Press, 1976.
- Visual Dictionary of Ships and Sailing. Dorling Kindersley, 1991.

== Social sciences ==
- Browne, Ray Broadus, Pat Browne. The guide to United States popular culture. Bowling Green State University Popular Press, 2001. ISBN 0-87972-821-3.
- Coulter, Michael L. Encyclopedia of Catholic social thought, social science, and social policy. Scarecrow Press, 2007. ISBN 978-0-8108-5906-7.
- DiCanio, Margaret. The Encyclopedia of Marriage, Divorce and the Family. Facts on File, 1989.
- Edgar, Andrew, Peter R. Sedgwick. Key concepts in cultural theory. Routledge, 1999. ISBN 0-415-11403-9.
- Kastenbaum, Robert. Encyclopedia of Adult Development. Oryx Press, 1993.
- Kastenbaum, Robert & Beatrice Kastenbaum. Encyclopedia of Death. Oryx, 1989.
- Kurian, George Thomas. Encyclopedia of the Future. Macmillan, 1994.
- Levinson, David. Encyclopedia of World Cultures. G.K. Hall, 1991–.
- Litoff, Judy Barrett, Judith McDonnell. European immigrant women in the United States: A biographical dictionary. Garland Publ., 1994. ISBN 0-8240-5306-0.
- Minahan, Anne. The Encyclopedia of Social Work. 18th ed., National Assn. of Social Workers, 1987.
- Payne, Michael. A dictionary of cultural and critical theory. Blackwell Reference, 1996. ISBN 0-631-17197-5.
- Petersen, William and Renee Petersen. Dictionary of Demography. Greenwood, 1985.
- Ramachandran, V. S. Encyclopedia of Human Behavior. Academic Press, 1994.
- Ross, John A. International Encyclopedia of Population. Free Press, 1982.
- Sills, David L., Robert King Merton. International encyclopedia of the social sciences. Macmillan, [1968]–1991. ISBN 0-02-895510-2.
- Sills, David L. International encyclopedia of the social sciences: Biographical supplement. The Free Press, 1979. ISBN 0-02-895510-2.

=== Aging ===
- Maddox, George L. The Encyclopedia of Aging. Springer, 1987.
- Roy, F. Hampton and Charles Russell. Encyclopedia of Aging and the Elderly. Facts on File, 1992.

=== Anthropology and ethnology ===
- Albala, Ken. Food cultures of the world encyclopedia. Greenwood, 2011. ISBN 978-0-313-37626-9.
- Amit, Vered. Biographical dictionary of social and cultural anthropology. Routledge, 2004. ISBN 0-415-22379-2.
- Babcock, Barbara A., Nancy J. Parezo. Daughters of the desert: Women anthropologists and the native American southwest, 1880–1980: An illustrated catalogue. University of New Mexico Press, 1988. ISBN 0-8263-1087-7.
- Bahn, Paul G. The new Penguin dictionary of archaeology. Penguin, 2004. ISBN 0-14-051447-3.
- Barker, Graeme. Companion encyclopedia of archaeology. Routledge, 1999. ISBN 0-415-06448-1.
- Barnard, Alan and Jonathan Spencer. Routledge encyclopedia of social and cultural anthropology. Routledge, 2010. ISBN 978-1-84972-800-3. .
- Bonte, Pierre, Michel Izard, Marion Abélès. Dictionnaire de l'ethnologie et de l'anthropologie. (Multilingual, some English). Quadrige/Presses universitaires de France, 2002. ISBN 2-13-050687-9.
- Brix, H. James. Encyclopedia of anthropology. Sage, 2006. ISBN 0-7619-3029-9.
- Brix, H. James. 21st century anthropology: a reference handbook. Sage Publications, 2010. ISBN 978-1-4129-5738-0.
- Carlisle, Richard. Illustrated Encyclopedia of Mankind. Marshall Cavendish, 1989.
- Carrasco, David. The Oxford encyclopedia of Mesoamerican cultures: The civilizations of Mexico and Central America. Oxford University Press, 2001. ISBN 0-19-510815-9.
- Cole, Jeffrey E. Ethnic groups of Europe: an encyclopedia. ABC-CLIO, 2011. ISBN 978-1-59884-303-3. .
- Danver, Steven Laurence. Native peoples of the world: an encyclopedia of groups, cultures, and contemporary issues. M.E. Sharpe, 2013. ISBN 978-0-7656-8222-2.
- Darvill, Timothy. The concise Oxford dictionary of archaeology. Oxford University Press, 2002. ISBN 0-19-211649-5.
- Eicher, Joanne Bubolz. Encyclopedia of world dress and fashion. Oxford University Press/Berg Publ., 2010. ISBN 978-0-19-537733-0.
- Ellis, Linda. Archaeological method and theory: An encyclopedia. Garland, 2000. ISBN 978-0-8153-1305-2.
- Encyclopedia of world cultures. G. K. Hall, 1991–1996. ISBN 0-8161-1840-X.
- Ethnic Groups of North, East and Central Asia. ABC-CLIO, 2014.
- Ethnic Groups of South Asia and the Pacific. ABC-CLIO, 2011.
- Farris, Phoebe. Women artists of color: A bio-critical sourcebook to 20th century artists in the Americas. Greenwood Press, 1999. ISBN 0-313-30374-6.
- Gacs, Ute. Women anthropologists: A biographical dictionary. Greenwood Press, 1988. ISBN 0-313-24414-6.
- Gaillard, Gérald, James Bowman. The Routledge dictionary of anthropologists. Routledge, 2004. ISBN 0-415-22825-5.
- Gordon, Robert J., Andrew P. Lyons, Harriet Lyons. Fifty key anthropologists. Routledge, 2011. ISBN 978-0-203-83879-2. .
- Gunter, Michael M. Historical dictionary of the Kurds. Scarecrow Press, 2004. ISBN 0-8108-4870-8.
- Hunter, David E. and Phillip Whitten. Encyclopedia of Anthropology. Harper & Row, 1976. ISBN 0-06-047094-1.
- Ingold, Tim. Companion encyclopedia of anthropology. Routledge, 1994. ISBN 0-415-02137-5.
- Koch, John T., Antone Minard. The Celts: history, life, and culture. ABC-CLIO, 2012. ISBN 978-1-59884-964-6.
- Kraig, Bruce and Colleen Taylor Sen. Street food around the world: an encyclopedia of food and culture. ABC-CLIO, 2013. ISBN 978-1-59884-954-7.
- Lee, Richard B., Richard Heywood Daly. The Cambridge encyclopedia of hunters and gatherers. Cambridge University Press, 1999. ISBN 0-521-57109-X.
- Levinson, David, Melvin Ember. Encyclopedia of cultural anthropology. Henry Holt, 1996. ISBN 0-8050-2877-3.
- Minahan, James B. Ethnic groups of the Americas: an encyclopedia. ABC-CLIO, 2013. ISBN 978-1-61069-163-5.
- Monger, George P. Marriage customs of the world: an encyclopedia of dating customs and wedding traditions. ABC-CLIO, 2013. ISBN 978-1-59884-663-8.
- Morris, Mike. Concise dictionary of social and cultural anthropology. Wiley-Blackwell, 2012. ISBN 978-1-4443-6698-3.
- Murray, Tim. Milestones in archaeology: A chronological encyclopedia. ABC-CLIO, 2007. ISBN 978-1-57607-186-1.
- Oliver, Douglas L. Oceania: The native cultures of Australia and the Pacific islands. University of Hawaii Press, 1989. ISBN 0-8248-1019-8.
- Olson, James Stuart. An ethnohistorical dictionary of China. Greenwood Press, 1998. ISBN 0-313-28853-4.
- Pearsall, Deborah M. Encyclopedia of archaeology. Elsevier, 2007. ISBN 978-0-12-548030-7.
- Peregrine, Peter N., Melvin Ember, Human Relations Area Files, Inc. Encyclopedia of prehistory. Kluwer Academic/Plenum, 2001–2002. ISBN 0-306-46264-8.
- Rapport, Nigel, Joanna Overing. Social and cultural anthropology: The key concepts. Routledge, 2007. ISBN 978-0-415-36750-9.
- Renfrew, Colin, Paul G. Bahn. Archaeology: The key concepts. Routledge, 2005. ISBN 0-415-31757-6.
- Seymour-Smith, Charlotte. Dictionary of Anthropology. G.K. Hall, 1986.
- Shoup, John A. Ethnic groups of Africa and the Middle East: an encyclopedia. ABC-CLIO, 2011. ISBN 978-1-59884-363-7 .
- Sol Tax. [s. n.] Fifth international directory of anthropologists. University of Chicago Press, 1975. ISBN 978-0-226-79077-0.
- Spencer, Frank. History of physical anthropology. Garland, 1997. ISBN 0-8153-0490-0.
- Stanton, Andrea L. Cultural sociology of the Middle East, Asia, & Africa: an encyclopedia. Sage Publications, 2012. ISBN 978-1-4129-8176-7.
- Stevenson, Joan. Dictionary of Concepts in Physical Anthropology. Greenwood. ISBN 0-313-24756-0.
- Stewart, William. Biographical dictionary of anthropologists. McFarland, 2009. ISBN 978-0-7864-3671-2.
- Tattersall, Ian. The Encyclopedia of Human Evolution and Prehistory. Garland. ISBN 0-8153-1696-8.
- Taylor, Patrick, Frederick Ivor Case, Sean Meighoo, Joyce Leung. The encyclopedia of Caribbean religions. University of Illinois Press, 2013. ISBN 978-0-252-03723-8.
- Thomas L. Mann Library-Anthropology Resource Group. Biographical directory of anthropologists born before 1920. Garland, 1988. ISBN 0-8240-5833-X.
- Venable, Shannon L. Gold: a cultural encyclopedia. ABC-CLIO, 2011. ISBN 978-0-313-38430-1.
- Weekes, Richard V. Muslim peoples: A world ethnographic survey. Greenwood Press, 1984. ISBN 0-313-23392-6.
- West, Barbara A. Encyclopedia of the peoples of Asia and Oceania. Facts On File, 2009. ISBN 978-0-8160-7109-8.
- Winters, Christopher, Michele Calhoun Library-Anthropology Resource Group (Chicago). International dictionary of anthropologists. Garland, 1991. ISBN 0-8240-5094-0.
- Winthrop, Robert H. Dictionary of Concepts in Cultural Anthropology. Greenwood, 1991. ISBN 0-313-24280-1.

==== African peoples ====
- Bute, E. L., H. J. P. Harmer. The Black handbook: The people, history, and politics of Africa and the African diaspora. Cassell, 1997. ISBN 0-304-33542-8.
- Dabydeen, David, John Gilmore, Cecily Jones. The Oxford companion to Black British history. Oxford University Press, 2007. ISBN 978-0-19-280439-6.
- Diagram Group. Encyclopedia of African peoples. Facts on File, 2000. ISBN 0-8160-4099-0.
- Olson, James Stuart. The peoples of Africa: An ethnohistorical dictionary. Greenwood Press, 1996. ISBN 0-313-27918-7.

==== American (U.S.) ethnic and cultural groups ====
- Cordasco, Francesco. Dictionary of American Immigration History. Scarecrow Press, 1990.
- Fogarty, Robert S. Dictionary of American Communal and Utopian History. Greenwood, 1980.
- Haines, David. Refugees in the United States: A Reference Handbook. Greenwood, 1985.
- Thernstrom, Stephan. Harvard Encyclopedia of American Ethnic Groups. Harvard University Press, 1980.
- Wynar, Lubomyr Roman. Guide to the American ethnic press: Slavic and East European newspapers and periodicals. Center for the Study of Ethnic Publications, School of Library Science, Kent State University, 1986.

===== African-Americans =====
- Appiah, Anthony, Henry Louis Gates. Africana: The encyclopedia of the African and African American experience. Oxford University Press, 2005. ISBN 0-19-517055-5.
- Asante, Molefi K. and Mark T. Mattson. Historical and Cultural Atlas of African Americans. Macmillan, 1991.
- Foner, Eric. Freedom's lawmakers: A directory of black officeholders during Reconstruction. Louisiana State University Press, 1996. ISBN 0-8071-2082-0.
- Gates, Henry Louis, Evelyn Brooks-Higginbotham. The African American national biography. Oxford University Press, 2013. ISBN 978-0-19-992077-8.
- Hine, Darlene Clark. Black Women in America: An Historical Encyclopedia. Carlson Publishing, 1993.
- Hine, Darlene Clark, Kathleen Thompson, Facts on File, Inc. Facts on File encyclopedia of black women in America. Facts on File, Inc., 1997. ISBN 0-8160-3425-7.
- Hornsby, Alton Jr.. Chronology of African-American History. Gale Research, 1991.
- Low, W. Augustus. Encyclopedia of Black America. McGraw-Hill, 1981.
- Lowery, Charles D. & John F. Marszalek. Encyclopedia of African-American Civil Rights: From Emancipation to the Present. Greenwood, 1992.
- Lowery, Charles D., John F. Marszalek, Thomas Adams Upchurch. The Greenwood encyclopedia of African American civil rights: From emancipation to the twenty-first century. Greenwood Press, 2003. ISBN 0-313-32171-X.
- Miller, Randall and John D. Smith. Dictionary of Afro-American Slavery. Greenwood, 1988.
- Ploski, Harry and James Williams. Negro Almanac: A Reference Work on the African American. 5th ed., Gale Research, 1989.
- Ragsdale, Bruce A., Joel D. Treese, Office of the Historian of the House of Representatives. Black Americans in Congress, 1870–1989. U. S. Government Printing Office, 1990.
- Smith, Jessie Carney, Shirelle Phelps. Notable black American women. Gale Research, 1992–2003. ISBN 0-8103-4749-0.
- Smythe, Mabel M. Black American Reference Book. Prentice-Hall, 1976.
- Who's who among African Americans. Gale Research, 1996–. ISSN 1081-1400.
- Williams, Michael W. The African American Encyclopedia. Marshall Cavendish, 1993.
- Wilson, Dreck Spurlock. African-American architects: A biographical dictionary, 1865–1945. Routledge, 2004. ISBN 0-415-92959-8.
- Wintz, Cary D., Paul Finkelman. Encyclopedia of the Harlem Renaissance. Routledge, 2004. ISBN 1-57958-389-X.

===== Asian-Americans =====
- Hirahara, Naomi. Distinguished Asian American business leaders. Greenwood Press, 2003. ISBN 978-1-57356-344-4.
- Kim, Hyung-Chan. Dictionary of Asian American History. Greenwood, 1986.
- Zia, Helen, Susan B. Gall, George Takei. Notable Asian Americans. Gale Research, 1995. ISBN 0-8103-9623-8.

====== Japanese Americans ======
- Niiya, Brian. Japanese American History: An A-to-Z Reference from 1868 to the present. Facts on File, 1993.

===== Latino Americans =====
- De La Torre, Miguel A. Hispanic American religious cultures. ABC-CLIO, 2009. ISBN 978-1-59884-139-8.
- Meier, Matt S., Conchita Franco Serri, Richard A. Garcia. Notable Latino Americans: A biographical dictionary. Greenwood Press, 1997. ISBN 0-585-38908-X.
- Ruíz, Vicki, Virginia Sánchez Korrol. Latinas in the United States: A historical encyclopedia. Indiana University Press, 2006. ISBN 0-253-34680-0.

===== Mexican-Americans =====
- Meier, Matt S. & Feliciano Rivera. Dictionary of Mexican-American History. Greenwood, 1981.

==== Canadian ethnic groups ====
- Magocsi, Paul R., Multicultural History Society of Ontario. Encyclopedia of Canada's peoples. University of Toronto Press, 1999. ISBN 0-8020-2938-8.

==== Diasporas ====
- Lal, Brij V., Peter Reeves, Rajesh Rai. The encyclopedia of the Indian diaspora. University of Hawaii Press, 2006. ISBN 0-8248-3146-2.
- Lopes, Nei. Enciclopédia brasileira da diáspora africana. Selo Negro Edições, 2004. ISBN 85-87478-21-4.
- Lynn Pan Chinese Heritage Center (Singapore). The encyclopedia of the Chinese overseas. Harvard University Press, 1999. ISBN 0-674-25210-1.
- Vilsaint, Féquière, Maude Heurtelou. Who is who in Haitian diaspora. Educa Vision, 2008. ISBN 978-1-58432-495-9.

==== Indigenous peoples of the Americas ====
- The American Indian: A Multimedia Encyclopedia. Facts on File, 1993.
- Brumble, H. David. An annotated bibliography of American Indian and Eskimo autobiographies. University of Nebraska Press, 1981. ISBN 0-8032-1175-9.
- Hamlin-Wilson, Gail. Biographical dictionary of Indians of the Americas. American Indian Publishers, 1991. ISBN 0-937862-29-0.
- Handbook of South American Indians. U.S. Government Printing Office, 1946–59.
- Hodge, Frederick Webb. Handbook of American Indians U. S. Bureau of American ethnology.
- Johnson, Troy R. Distinguished Native American spiritual practitioners and healers. Oryx Press, 2002. ISBN 1-57356-358-7.
- North American Indian thought and culture. Alexander Street Press, 2005–. Available online here.
- Olson, James S. Indians of Central and South America: An Ethnohistorical Dictionary. Greenwood, 1991.
- Steward, Julian Haynes, Jay I. Kislak Reference Collection (Library of Congress). Handbook of South American Indians. U.S. Government Printing Office, 1946–59.
- Sturtevant, William C. Handbook of North American Indians. Smithsonian Institution, 1978–.
- Waldman, Carl. Biographical dictionary of American Indian history to 1900. Facts on File, 2001. ISBN 0-8160-4252-7.
- Wauchope, Robert, Jay I. Kislak Reference Collection (Library of Congress). Handbook of Middle American Indians. University of Texas Press, [1964–76]. ISBN 0-292-70014-8.

==== Jews ====
- Abramson, Glenda, Dovid Katz. The Blackwell companion to Jewish culture: From the eighteenth century to the present. Blackwell Reference, 1989. ISBN 0-631-15111-7.
- Cohn-Sherbok, Dan. The dictionary of Jewish biography. Oxford University Press, 2005. ISBN 0-19-522391-8.
- Lapide, Pinchas, Hilmar Schmuck. Jüdisches biographisches archiv (Jewish biographical archive.). K. G. Saur, 1994. ISBN 3-598-33604-7.

=== Gender studies ===
- Aldrich, Robert, Garry Wotherspoon. Who's who in gay and lesbian history: From antiquity to World War II. Routledge, 2002. ISBN 0-415-15982-2.
- The Alyson Almanac. Alyson Publications. 1985. ISBN 978-1-55583-286-5.
- Benowitz, June Melby (1998). Encyclopedia of American women and religion. ABC-CLIO. ISBN 978-0-87436-887-1.
- Bullough, Vern L.; Lilli Sentz, eds. (2000). American nursing: a biographical dictionary. Springer. ISBN 978-0-8261-1147-0.
- Dynes, Wayne R.; Warren Johansson; William A. Percy, eds. (1990). Encyclopedia of Homosexuality. Garland Press. ISBN 978-0-8240-6544-7.
- Kaufman, Martin, ed. (1988). Dictionary of American nursing biography. New York: Greenwood Press. ISBN 978-0-313-24520-6.
- Keller, Rosemary Skinner; Rosemary Radford Ruether; Marie Cantlon (2006). Encyclopedia of Women and Religion in North America. Indiana University Press. ISBN 978-0-253-34685-8.
- Scrivener, Laurie, ed. (2002). A Biographical Dictionary of Women Healers: Midwives, Nurses, and Physicians. Oryx Press. ISBN 978-1-57356-219-5.
- Walter, Lynn; Manisha Desai; Cheryl Toronto Kalny; Amy Lind; Bahira Sherif-Trask; Aili Mari Tripp (2006). The Greenwood Encyclopedia of Women's Issues Worldwide. Greenwood. ISBN 978-0-313-32787-2.
- Windsor, Laura Lynn, ed. (2002). Women in medicine: An encyclopedia. Santa Barbara, CA: ABC-CLIO. ISBN 978-1-57607-392-6.
- Young, Serinity, ed. (1998). Encyclopedia of women and world religion. Macmillan Reference USA. ISBN 978-0-02-864608-4.

=== Peace ===
- Josephson, Harold, Sandi E. Cooper, Solomon Wank, Lawrence S. Wittner, Donald S. Birn. Biographical dictionary of modern peace leaders. Greenwood Press, 1985. ISBN 0-313-22565-6.
- Roberts, Nancy L. American peace writers, editors, and periodicals: A dictionary. Greenwood Press, 1991. ISBN 0-313-26842-8.

=== Psychology ===
- Baker Encyclopedia of Psychology. Baker Book House, 1985.
- Bruno, Frank. Dictionary of Key Words in Psychology. Routledge, 1986.
- Bruno, Frank J. The Family Mental Health Encyclopedia. Wiley, 1989.
- Catskardon, Mary A. Encyclopedia of Sleep and Dreaming. Macmillan, 1993.
- Corsini, Raymond J. Concise Encyclopedia of Psychology. Wiley, 1987.
- Corsini, Raymond J. & Bonnie D. Ozaki. Encyclopedia of Psychology. 2nd ed., Wiley, 1994.
- Doctor, Ronald M. & Ada P. Kahn. The Encyclopedia of Phobias, Fears, and Anxieties. Facts on File, 1989.
- Evans, Glen & Norman L. Farberow. The Encyclopedia of Suicide. Facts on File, 1988.
- Eysenck, H. J. Encyclopedia of Psychology. 2nd ed., Continuum, 1979.
- Gregory, R. L., O. L. Zangwill. The Oxford companion to the mind. Oxford University Press, 1987. ISBN 0-19-866124-X.
- Guiley, Rosemary Ellen. Encyclopedia of Dreams: Symbols and Interpretations. Crossroad, 1993.
- Harre, Ron and Roger Lamb. The Encyclopedic Dictionary of Psychology. MIT Press, 1983.
- A history of psychology in autobiography. American Psychological Association, 1930–. ISSN 0097-6091.
- Houdé, Olivier Daniel Kayser, Vivian Waltz, Christian Cav. Dictionary of cognitive science: Neuroscience, psychology, artificial intelligence, linguistics, and philosophy. Psychology Press, 2004. ISBN 1-57958-251-6.
- Howells, John G. & M. Livia Osborn. A Reference Companion to the History of Abnormal Psychology. Greenwood, 1984.
- Kahn, Ada P. & Jan Fawcett. The Encyclopedia of Mental Health. Facts on File, 1993.
- Kass, Frederic I. The Columbia University College of Physicians and Surgeons Complete Home Guide to Mental Health. Holt, 1992.
- Lasne, Sophie and Andre Gaultier. Dictionary of Superstitions. Prentice-Hall, 1984.
- The Marshall Cavendish Encyclopedia of Personal Relationships. Marshall Cavendish, 1990.
- Miller, Gustavus Hindman. The Dictionary of Dreams:10,000 Dreams Interpreted. 1901; Prentice-Hall, 1985.
- Noll, Richard. The Encyclopedia of Schizophrenia and the Psychotic Disorders. Facts on File, 1992.
- O'Connell, Agnes N., Nancy Felipe Russo. Models of achievement: Reflections of eminent women in psychology. Columbia University Press, 1983–2001. ISBN 0-231-05312-6.
- Opie, Iona & Moira Tatem. A Dictionary of Superstitions. Oxford University Press, 1989.
- Pettijohn, Terry F. Encyclopedic Dictionary of Psychology. Dushkin, 4th ed., 1991.
- Popplestone, John A. & Marion White McPherson. Dictionary of Concepts in General Psychology. Greenwood, 1988.
- Radford, Edwin and Mona. Encyclopedia of Superstitions. Philosophical Library, 1949; Greenwood, 1969.
- Roesch, Roberta. Encyclopedia of Depression. Facts on File, 1991.
- Sheehy, Noel (2002). Biographical Dictionary of Psychology. Taylor & Francis. ISBN 978-0-415-28561-2.
- Sheehy, Noel, Antony J. Chapman, Wendy A. Conroy. Biographical dictionary of psychology. Routledge Reference, 1997. ISBN 0-415-09997-8.
- Thorpy, Michael and Jan Yager. Encyclopedia of Sleep and Sleep Disorders. Facts on File, 1991.
- Wagman, Morton.Historical dictionary of quotations in cognitive science: A treasury of quotations in psychology, philosophy, and artificial intelligence. Greenwood Press, 2000. ISBN 0-313-31284-2.
- Wolman, Benjamin B. International Encyclopedia of Psychiatry, Psychology, Psychoanalysis, and Neurology. Aesculaius Publishers, 1977.

==== Psychoanalysis ====
- Eidelberg, Ludwig. Encyclopedia of Psychoanalysis. Free Press, 1968.
- Laplanche, Jean & J. B. Pontalis. Language of Psychoanalysis. Norton, 1973.
- Moore, Burness E. & Bernard D. Fine. Psychoanalytic Terms and Concepts. American Psychological Assn. & Yale, 1990.

=== Sociology ===
- Borgatta, Edgar F. & Marie L. Borgatta. Encyclopedia of Sociology. Macmillan, 1992.
- DeFronzo, James V. Revolutionary movements in world history: From 1750 to the present. ABC-CLIO, 2006. ISBN 1-85109-793-7.
- Jary, David and Julia Jary. HarperCollins Dictionary of Sociology. HarperCollins, 1991.
- Kagan, Jerome; Gall, Susan B. (1998). The Gale Encyclopedia of Childhood & Adolescence. Gale. ISBN 978-0-8103-9884-9.
- Lachmann, Richard. Encyclopedic Dictionary of Sociology. 4th ed., Dushkin, 1991.
- Mann, Michael. International Encyclopedia of Sociology: A Concise Encyclopedic Reference Work for all Students of the Social Sciences. Crossroad, 1984.
- Nordegren, Thomas (2002). The A–Z Encyclopedia of Alcohol and Drug Abuse. Universal-Publishers. ISBN 978-1-58112-404-0.
- Rappaport, Helen (2001). Encyclopedia of Women Social Reformers. ABC-CLIO. p. 335. ISBN 978-1-57607-101-4.
- George Ritzer (2007), The Blackwell Encyclopedia of Sociology, Malden, Mass; Oxford, Blackwell, 6,384 pages. ISBN 1-4051-2433-4. An online version is also accessible by subscription.
- Thompson, William Norman (2001). Gambling in America: An Encyclopedia of History, Issues, and Society. ABC-CLIO. ISBN 978-1-57607-159-5.
- Van Creveld, Martin L. The encyclopedia of revolutions and revolutionaries: From anarchism to Zhou Enlai. Facts on File, 1996. ISBN 0-8160-3236-X.

==== Crime and law enforcement ====
- Dictionary of Crime: Criminal Justice, Criminology and Law Enforcement. Paragon House, 1992.
- Fay, John J. Police Dictionary and Encyclopedia. Charles C. Thomas, 1988.
- Kadish, Sanford H. The Encyclopedia of Crime and Justice. Free Press, 1983.
- Kurian, George Thomas. World Encyclopedia of Police Forces and Penal Systems. Facts on File, 1989.
- Nash, Jay Robert. Encyclopedia of World Crime: Criminal Justice, Criminology, and Law Enforcement. CrimeBooks, 1990.
- Sifakis, Carl. The Encyclopedia of American Crime. rev. ed., Smithmark, 1992.
- Williams, Vergil L. Dictionary of American Penology. Greenwood, 1987.

=== Women's studies ===
- Adamson, Lynda G. Notable women in world history: A guide to recommended biographies and autobiographies. Greenwood Press, 1998. ISBN 0-313-29818-1.
- Babcock, Barbara A., Nancy J. Parezo. Daughters of the desert: Women anthropologists and the native American southwest, 1880–1980: An illustrated catalogue. University of New Mexico Press, 1988. ISBN 0-8263-1087-7.
- Bakken, Gordon Moris; Farrington, Brenda (2003). Encyclopedia of Women in the American West. Sage Publications. ISBN 978-0-7619-2356-5.
- Benowitz, June Melby. Encyclopedia of American women and religion. ABC-CLIO, 1998. ISBN 0-87436-887-1.
- Claghorn, Charles Eugene. Women composers and hymnists: A concise biographical dictionary. Scarecrow Press, 1984. ISBN 0-8108-1680-6.
- Claghorn, Charles Eugene. Women composers and songwriters: A concise biographical dictionary. Scarecrow Press, 1996. ISBN 0-8108-3130-9.
- Clinton, Catherine, Christine A. Lunardini. The Columbia guide to American women in the nineteenth century. Columbia University Press, 2000. ISBN 0-231-10920-2.
- Commire, Anne, Deborah Klezmer. Dictionary of women worldwide: 25,000 women through the ages. Thomson Gale, 2007. ISBN 0-7876-7585-7.
- Cook, Bernard A. Women and war: A historical encyclopedia from antiquity to the present. ABC-CLIO, 2006. ISBN 1-85109-770-8.
- Cullen-DuPont, Kathryn. Encyclopedia of women's history in America. Facts on File, 2000. ISBN 0-8160-4100-8.
- Foerstel, Karen. Biographical dictionary of congressional women. Greenwood Press, 1999. ISBN 0-313-30290-1.
- Grattan, Virginia L. American women songwriters: A biographical dictionary. Greenwood Press, 1993. ISBN 0-313-28510-1.
- Haan, Francisca de, Krasimira Daskalova, Anna Loutfi. Biographical dictionary of women's movements and feminisms in Central, Eastern, and South Eastern Europe: 19th and 20th centuries. CEU Press/Central European University Press, 2006. ISBN 978-963-7326-39-4.
- Hillauer, Rebecca (2005). Encyclopedia Of Arab Women Filmmakers. American Univ in Cairo Press. p. 4. ISBN 978-977-424-943-3.
- Hine, Darlene Clark. Black Women in America: An Historical Encyclopedia. Carlson Publishing, 1993.
- Hine, Darlene Clark, Kathleen Thompson, Facts on File, Inc. Facts on File encyclopedia of black women in America. Facts on File, Inc., 1997. ISBN 0-8160-3425-7.
- The international who's who of women. Europa Publications Ltd., 1992–. ISSN 0965-3775.
- Joseph, Suad, Afsaneh Najmabadi. Encyclopedia of women and Islamic cultures. Brill, 2003–2007. ISBN 978-90-04-13247-4.
- Keller, Rosemary Skinner, Rosemary Radford Ruether, Marie Cantlon. Encyclopedia of women and religion in North America. Indiana University Press, 2006. ISBN 0-253-34685-1.
- Krismann, Carol. Encyclopedia of American women in business: from colonial times to the present. Greenwood Press, 2005. ISBN 978-0-313-32757-5.
- Kuiper, Kathleen. The 100 most influential women of all time. Britannica Educational Pub. : Rosen Educational Services, 2010. ISBN 978-1-61530-010-5.
- Law, Cheryl. Women, a modern political dictionary. I.B. Tauris, 2000. ISBN 1-86064-502-X.
- Mankiller, Wilma Pearl. The reader's companion to U.S. women's history. Houghton Mifflin, 1998. ISBN 0-395-67173-6.
- Mays, Dorothy A. Women in early America: Struggle, survival, and freedom in a new world. ABC-CLIO, 2004. ISBN 1-85109-429-6.
- Netzley, Patricia D. (2001). The Encyclopedia of Women's Travel and Exploration. Oryx Press. ISBN 978-1-57356-238-6.
- O'Dea, Suzanne. From suffrage to the Senate: America's political women: an encyclopedia of leaders, causes & issues. Grey House Publ., 2013. ISBN 978-1-61925-010-9.
- Oldfield, Sybil. Collective biography of women in England, 1550–1900: A select annotated bibliography. Mansell, 1999. ISBN 0-7201-2321-6.
- Opfell, Olga S. Women prime ministers and presidents. McFarland, 1993. ISBN 0-89950-790-5.
- Rappaport, Helen (2001). Encyclopedia of Women Social Reformers. ABC-CLIO. p. 335. ISBN 978-1-57607-101-4.
- Riddle, Larry. Biographies of women mathematicians. Agnes Scott College. Available online here.
- Sadie, Julie Anne, Rhian Samuel. The Norton/Grove dictionary of women composers. W.W. Norton, 1994. ISBN 0-393-03487-9.
- Schenken, Suzanne O'Dea, Ann W. Richards. From suffrage to the Senate: An encyclopedia of American women in politics. ABC-CLIO, 1999. ISBN 0-87436-960-6.
- Schumaher, Schuma, Erico Vital Brazil. Dicionário mulheres do Brasil: De 1500 até a atualidade; Com 270 ilustrações. J. Zahar Editor, 2000. ISBN 85-7110-573-1.
- Seller, Maxine. Women educators in the United States, 1820–1993: A bio-bibliographical sourcebook. Greenwood Press, 1994. ISBN 0-313-27937-3.
- Sherrow, Victoria. A to Z of American women business leaders and entrepreneurs. Facts on File, 2002. ISBN 978-0-8160-4556-3.
- Tierney, Helen. Women's Studies Encyclopedia. Greenwood, 1989–1991.
- Tovar, Aurora. Mil quinientas mujeres en nuestra conciencia colectiva: Catálogo biográfico de mujeres de México. Documentación y Estudio de Mujeres, 1996. ISBN 968-6851-16-X.
- Tuttle, Lisa. Encyclopedia of Feminism. Facts on File, 1986.
- Uglow, Jennifer S., Frances Hinton, Maggy Hendry. The Palgrave Macmillan dictionary of women's biography. Palgrave Macmillan, 2005. ISBN 1-4039-3448-7.
- Walker, Barbara G. Woman's Encyclopedia of Myths and Secrets. Harper, 1983.
- Young, Serinity. Encyclopedia of women and world religion. Macmillan Reference USA, 1999. ISBN 0-02-864608-8.
- Zophy, Angela Howard. Handbook of American Women's History. Garland, 1990.

== Speech and rhetoric ==
- Brewer, David Josiah; et al. (1901). World's best orations. St. Louis: Kaiser.

== Sports and games ==
- Arlott, John. Oxford Companion to World Sports and Games. Oxford, 1975.
- Barnes, Dana R. Notable sports figures. Gale Group, 2004. ISBN 0-7876-6628-9.
- Botermans, Jack. The World of Games: Their Origins and History, How to Play Games, and How to Make Them. Facts on File, 1989.
- Hickok, Ralph. The Encyclopedia of North American Sports History. Facts on File, 1992.
- Hickok, Ralph. New Encyclopedia of Sports. McGraw-Hill, 1977.
- Menke, Frank, rev. by Pete Palmer. Encyclopedia of Sports. A.S. Barnes, 1977.
- Petzal, David E. Encyclopedia of Sporting Firearms. Facts on File, 1991.
- Porter, David L. (2000). Biographical Dictionary of American Sports: G-P. Greenwood Publishing Group. ISBN 978-0-313-31175-8.
- Porter, David L. A cumulative index to the biographical dictionary of American sports. Greenwood Press, 1993. ISBN 0-313-28435-0.
- Rules of the Game: The Complete Illustrated Encyclopedia of All Major Sports of the World. by the Diagram Group, St. Martin's Press, 1990.
- Smith, Stephen L. J. Dictionary of Concepts in Recreation and Leisure Studies. Greenwood, 1990.
- Sports illustrated ... almanac. Bishop Books, 2002–. ISSN 1056-7887,
- Suffolk and Berkshire, Henry Charles Howard, earl of. Encyclopedia of Sports and Games. Heinemann, 1910.
- Tver, David F. & Howard F. Hunt. Encyclopedic Dictionary of Sports Medicine. Routledge, Chapman & Hall, 1986.
- White, Jess R. Sports Rules Encyclopedia. Leisure Press, 1989.

=== American football ===
- Neft, David S. & Richard M. Cohen. The Football Encyclopedia. St. Martin's Press, 1991.
- Ours, Robert. College Football Encyclopedia: The Authoritative Guide to 124 Years of College Football. Prima Publishing, 1993.
- Riffenburgh, Beau. Official NFL Encyclopedia. NAL, 1986.
- The sporting news pro football register. Sporting News, 1966–.

=== Baseball ===
- Big League Baseball Electronic Encyclopedia. Franklin Electronic, 1992.
- Neft, David and Richard Cohen. Sports Encyclopedia: Baseball. St. Martin's Press, 1989.
- Nemec, David. The rank and file of 19th century major league baseball: biographies of 1,084 players, owners, managers and umpires. McFarland & Co., 2012. ISBN 978-0-7864-6890-4.
- Reichler, Joseph L. The Baseball Encyclopedia: The Complete and Official Record of Major League Baseball. Macmillan, 1993.
- Riley, James A. The biographical encyclopedia of the negro baseball leagues. Carroll & Graf, 1994. ISBN 0-7867-0065-3.
- Sporting News. Baseball register. Sporting News, 1940–. ISSN 0162-542X.
- Thorn, John and Pete Palmer. Total Baseball: The Ultimate Encyclopedia of Baseball. Warner Books, 1992.

=== Basketball ===
- Hollander, Zander & Alex Sachare. The Official NBA Basketball Encyclopedia: The Complete History and Statistics of Professional Basketball. Random House, 1989.
- Neft, David and Richard Cohen. Sports Encyclopedia: Pro Basketball. St. Martin's Press, 1989.
- Porter, David L. Basketball: A biographical dictionary. Greenwood Press, 2005. ISBN 0-313-30952-3.
- Savage, Jim. Encyclopedia of the NCAA basketball tournament. Dell, 1990.

=== Boxing ===
- Roberts, James B., Alexander G. Skutt International Boxing Hall of Fame. The boxing register: International boxing hall of fame official record book. McBooks Press, 2006. ISBN 1-59013-121-5.

=== Card games ===
- Ainslie, Tom. Ainslie's Complete Hoyle. Simon & Schuster, 1973.
- Scarne, John. Scarne's Encyclopedia of Card Games. HarperCollins, 1983.
- Scarne, John. Scarne's Encyclopedia of Games. HarperCollins, 1973.

==== Bridge ====
- Francis, Harry G. The Official Encyclopedia of Bridge. Crown, 1984.
- Reese, Terence and Albert Dormer. Bridge Player's Alphabetical Handbook. Farber & Farber, 1981.

=== Chess ===
- Divinsky, Nathan. Chess Encyclopedia. Facts on File, 1991.
- Hooper, David & Kenneth Whyld. The Oxford Companion to Chess. Oxford, 1992.

=== Fishing ===
- Bates, Joseph. Fishing: An Encyclopedic Guide to Tackle and Tactics for Fresh and Salt Water. Dutton, 1985.
- McClane, A. J. McClane's New Standard Fishing Encyclopedia and International Angling Guide. Holt, 1974.

=== Golf ===
- Campbell, Malcolm. Random House International Encyclopedia of Golf: The Definitive Guide to the Game. Random House, 1991.
- Peper, George. Golf Magazine's Encyclopedia of Golf. HarperCollins, 1993.

=== Hockey ===
- Fischler, Stan and Shirley Fischler. Hockey Encyclopedia. Macmillan, 1983.
- Hollander, Zander. The Complete Encyclopedia of Hockey. Gale Research, 1992.

=== Magic ===
- Waters, T. A. The Encyclopedia of Magic and Magicians. Facts on File, 1988.

=== Running ===
- Temple, Cliff. Running from A to Z. Stanley Paul, 1987.

=== Snooker and billiards ===
- Morrison, Ian (1985). The Hamlyn Encyclopedia of Snooker. Hamlyn. ISBN 978-0-600-50192-3.
- Shamos, Michael Ian (2002). The New Illustrated Encyclopedia of Billiards. The Lyons Press. ISBN 978-1-58574-685-9.

=== Soccer ===
- LeBlanc, Michael & Richard Henshaw. The World Encyclopedia of Soccer. Gale Research, 1993.

=== Tennis ===
- Collins, Bud & Zander Hollander. Bud Collins' Modern Encyclopedia of Tennis. Gale Research, 1993.
- Shannon, Bill. United States Tennis Association Official Encyclopedia of Tennis. HarperCollins, 1981.

=== Wrestling ===
- Chapman, Mike. Encyclopedia of American Wrestling. Leisure Press, 1990.
- Jesse, John. Wrestling: Physical Conditioning Encyclopedia. Athletic Press, 1974.
- Lentz, Harris M. Biographical dictionary of professional wrestling. McFarland & Co, 2003. ISBN 0-7864-1754-4.

== Technology and engineering ==
- Carey, Charles W., Ian C. Friedman. American inventors, entrepreneurs, and business visionaries. Facts On File, 2010. ISBN 978-0-8160-8146-2.
- Narayanan, V. K.; O'Connor, Gina Colarelli (2010). Encyclopedia of Technology and Innovation Management. John Wiley & Sons. ISBN 978-1-4051-6049-0.
- Skempton, A. W. (2002). A Biographical Dictionary of Civil Engineers in Great Britain and Ireland: 1500–1830. Thomas Telford. ISBN 978-0-7277-2939-2.

== Warfare ==
- "1914–1918-online. International Encyclopedia of the First World War". Brussels. October 8, 2014. Archived from the original on December 26, 2017.
- Adamec, Ludwig W. Historical dictionary of Afghan wars, revolutions, and insurgencies. Scarecrow Press, 2005. ISBN 0-8108-4948-8.
- Andrea, Alfred J. Encyclopedia of the crusades. Greenwood Press, 2003. ISBN 0-313-31659-7.
- Arnold, Guy. Historical dictionary of civil wars in Africa. Scarecrow Press, 2008. ISBN 978-0-8108-5766-7.
- Beckett, I. F. W. (2009). Encyclopedia of Guerrilla Warfare (Hardcover). Santa Barbara, California: Abc-CLIO Inc. ISBN 978-0-87436-929-8.
- Bennett, Matthew. The Hutchinson dictionary of ancient and medieval warfare. Fitzroy Dearborn, 1998. ISBN 1-57958-116-1.
- Bercuson, David, J. L. Granatstein. Canadian military history. Oxford University Press, 1992. ISBN 0-19-540847-0.
- Bradford, James C., Jeremy Black. International encyclopedia of military history. Routledge, 2006. ISBN 0-415-93661-6.
- Brogan, Patrick. World conflicts. Scarecrow Press, 1998. ISBN 0-8108-3551-7.
- Budge, Kent G. (2007–2013). "The Pacific War Online Encyclopedia".
- Calvert, Peter, John B. Allcock. Border and territorial disputes of the world. John Harper, 2004. ISBN 0-9543811-3-0.
- Charny, Israel W., Desmon M. Tutu, Simon Wiesenthal. Encyclopedia of genocide. ABC-CLIO, 1999. ISBN 0-87436-928-2.
- Ciment, James. Encyclopedia of conflicts since World War II. M.E. Sharpe, 2007. ISBN 978-0-7656-8005-1.
- Clements, Frank A. Conflict in Afghanistan: A historical encyclopedia. ABC-CLIO, 2003. ISBN 1-85109-402-4.
- Clodfelter, Micheal. Warfare and Armed Conflict. McFarland, 1982.
- Cook, Bernard A. Women and war: A historical encyclopedia from antiquity to the present. ABC-CLIO, 2006. ISBN 1-85109-770-8.
- Cortada, James W. Historical dictionary of the Spanish Civil War, 1936–1939. Greenwood Press, 1982. ISBN 0-313-22054-9.
- Dupuy, R. Ernest and Trevor N. Dupuy. The Harper Encyclopedia of Military History: From 3500 BC to the Present. 4th ed, HarperCollins, 1993.
- Dupuy, Trevor N. International Military and Defense Encyclopedia. Brassey's, 1993.
- Dupuy, Trevor Nevitt, Curt Johnson, David L. Bongard. The Harper encyclopedia of military biography. HarperCollins, 1992. ISBN 0-06-270015-4.
- Fremont-Barnes, Gregory. The encyclopedia of the French revolutionary and Napoleonic Wars: A political, social, and military history. ABC-CLIO, 2006. ISBN 978-1-85109-646-6.
- Grossman, Mark. Encyclopedia of the Persian Gulf War. ABC-CLIO, 1995. ISBN 1-57607-406-4.
- Heathcote, TA (1999). The British Field Marshals, 1763–1997: A Biographical Dictionary. Barnsley: Pen and Sword Books. ISBN 978-0-85052-696-7.
- "Encyclopedia: First World War". firstworldwar.com.
- Holmes, Richard, Martin Marix Evans. Battlefield: Decisive conflicts in history. Oxford University Press, 2006. ISBN 978-0-19-280653-6.
- Holmes, Richard, Hew Strachan, Christopher Bellamy. The Oxford companion to military history. Oxford University Press, 2001. ISBN 0-19-866209-2.
- Horvitz, Leslie Alan; Catherwood, Christopher (2011). Encyclopedia of War Crimes & Genocide (Hardcover). Vol. 2 (Revised ed.). New York: Facts on File. ISBN 978-0-8160-8083-0. ISBN 0-8160-8083-6
- Instituto Nacional de Estudios Históricos de la Revolución Mexicana. Diccionario histórico y biográfico de la Revolución Mexicana. Instituto Nacional de Estudios Históricos de la Revolución Mexicana, Secretaría de Gobernación, 1990–1994. ISBN 968-805-562-X.
- Jessup, John E. An encyclopedic dictionary of conflict and conflict resolution, 1945–1996. Greenwood Press, 1998. ISBN 0-313-28112-2.
- Jouanna, Arlette. Histoire et dictionnaire des guerres de religion. R. Laffont, 1998. ISBN 2-221-07425-4.
- Keegan, John; Wheatcroft, Andrew (1976). Who's Who in Military History: From 1453 to the present day. New York: William Morrow & Co. ISBN 978-0-688-02956-2.
- Kohn, George Childs. Dictionary of wars. Facts on File/Checkmark Books, 2007. ISBN 0-8160-6577-2.
- Kohut, David R., Olga Vilella, Beatric Julian. Historical dictionary of the "dirty wars". Scarecrow Press, 2003. ISBN 0-8108-4853-8.
- Kort, Michael. The Columbia guide to the Cold War. Columbia University Press, 1998. ISBN 0-231-10772-2.
- Kumaraswamy, P. R. Historical dictionary of the Arab-Israeli conflict. Scarecrow Press, 2006. ISBN 0-8108-5343-4.
- Martel, Gordon (1999–2014). Martel, Gordon (ed.). The Encyclopedia of War (Online). Vol. 5. Chichester, West Sussex, Malden, MA: Wiley-Blackwell/John Wiley and Sons. doi:10.1002/9781444338232. ISBN 978-1-4443-3823-2.
- Morkot, Robert. Historical dictionary of ancient Egyptian warfare. Scarecrow Press, 2003. ISBN 0-8108-4862-7.
- Murray, Alan V. The Crusades: An encyclopedia. ABC-CLIO, 2006. ISBN 1-57607-862-0.
- Perez, Louis G. Japan at war: an encyclopedia. ABC-CLIO, 2013. ISBN 978-1-59884-741-3.
- Phillips, Charles; Axelrod, Alan (2005). Encyclopedia of Wars (Hardcover). Vol. 3. New York: Fact on File Library of World History. ISBN 978-0-8160-2851-1.
- Pope, Stephen. Dictionary of the Napoleonic wars. Facts on File, 1999. ISBN 0-8160-4243-8.
- Scott, Samuel F. and Barry Rothaus. Historical Dictionary of the French Revolution 1789–1799. Greenwood, 1985. ISBN 0-313-21141-8.
- Suratteau, Jean-René, Francis Gendron, Jean Paul Bertaud. Dictionnaire historique de la Révolution française. Presses universitaires de France, 1989. ISBN 2-13-042522-4.
- Vance, Jonathan F. (2006). The Encyclopedia of Prisoners of War & Internment (Hardcover) (Second ed.). Millerton, NY: Grey House Pub, 2006. p. 800. ISBN 978-1-59237-120-4. ISBN 978-1-59237-120-4; EBook ISBN 978-1-59237-170-9
- Tobias, Norman. International Military Encyclopedia. Academic International, 1992–.
- Tucker, Spencer. Encyclopedia of the Cold War: A political, social, and military history. ABC-CLIO, 2007. ISBN 978-1-85109-701-2.
- Van Creveld, Martin L. The encyclopedia of revolutions and revolutionaries: From anarchism to Zhou Enlai. Facts on File, 1996. ISBN 0-8160-3236-X.
- Wagner, J. A. Encyclopedia of the Wars of the Roses. ABC-CLIO, 2001. ISBN 1-85109-358-3.
- Wortzel, Larry M., Robin D. S. Higham. Dictionary of contemporary Chinese military history. Greenwood Press, 1999. ISBN 0-313-29337-6.

=== Air forces and military aircraft ===
- Angelucci, Enzo. Rand McNally Encyclopedia of Military Aircraft 1914–1980. Rand McNally, 1981.
- Chant, Christopher. World Encyclopedia of Modern Air Weapons. Patrick Stephens, 1989.
- Gunston, Bill. Illustrated Encyclopedia of Major Military Aircraft of the World. Crescent, 1983.
- Jane's All the World's Aircraft. Jane's Publishing, 1908–.
- Taylor, Michael J. H. Encyclopedia of the World's Air Forces. Facts on File, 1968.
- Wortzel, Larry M., Robin D. S. Higham. Dictionary of contemporary Chinese military history. Greenwood Press, 1999. ISBN 0-313-29337-6.

=== Arms and weaponry ===
- Tarussuk, Leonid and Claude Bair. Complete Encyclopedia of Arms and Weapons. Simon & Schuster, 1979.
- Weapons: An International Encyclopedia from 5000 BC to 2000 AD. prepared by the Diagram Group, Revised ed, St Martin's, 1991.
- Willis, Chuck. The illustrated encyclopedia of weaponry: from flint axes to automatic weapons. Thunder Bay Press in association with the Berman Museum of World History, 2012. ISBN 978-1-60710-501-5.

==== Arms control and disarmament ====
- Burns, Richard Dean. Encyclopedia of Arms Control and Disarmament. Scribner's, 1993.

=== Battles ===
- Chandler, David. Dictionary of Battles: The World's Key Battles from 405 BC to Today. Holt, 1987.
- Eggenberger, David. An Encyclopedia of Battles: Accounts of Over 1560 Battles from 1479 BC to the Present. Rev ed, Dover, 1985.
- Harbottle's Dictionary of Battles. 3rd ed, rev. by George Bruce, Van Nostrand, 1987.
- Laffin, John. Brassey's Battles: 3500 Years of Conflict Campaigns and Wars from A–Z. Brassey's, 1986.

=== Espionage and intelligence ===
- Buranelli, Vincent and Nan. Spy/Counterspy: An Encyclopedia of Espionage. McGraw-Hill, 1982.
- Deacon, Richard. Spyclopedia: The Comprehensive Handbook of Espionage. Morrow, 1989.
- Lerner, K. Lee; Wilmoth, Brenda, eds. (2015) [2004]. "Encyclopedia of Espionage, Intelligence, and Security". Espionage Information: Encyclopedia of Espionage, Intelligence and Security (1st ed.). Detroit: Thomson/Gale, Advameg Inc. ISBN 978-0-7876-7546-2.
- Seth, Ronald (1972). Encyclopedia of espionage. London: New English Library. p. 683. ISBN 978-0-450-01319-5.
- Spies and Provocateurs: A Worldwide Encyclopedia of Persons Conducting Espionage and Covert Action 1946–1991. McFarland, 1992.

==== United States espionage and intelligence ====
- O'Toole, G. J. A. The Encyclopedia of American Intelligence and Espionage: From the Revolutionary War to the Present. Facts on File, 1988.
- United States Intelligence: An Encyclopedia. Garland, 1990.

=== Navies and military ships ===
- Conway's All the World's Fighting Ships. Naval Institute Press, 1979–1985.
- Gauppini, Gino. Warships of the World: An Illustrated Encyclopedia. Times Books, 1986.

=== Terrorism and political violence ===
- Almanac of Modern Terrorism. Facts on File, 1991.
- Anderson, Sean K., Stephen Sloan. Historical dictionary of terrorism. Scarecrow Press, 2009. ISBN 978-0-8108-6311-8. Available online here.
- Atkins, Stephen. Terrorism: A Reference Handbook. ABC-CLIO, 1992.
- Encyclopedia of Afghan Jihad
- Ciment, James. World terrorism: an encyclopedia of political violence from ancient times to the post-911 era. M.E. Sharpe, 2011. ISBN 978-0-7656-8284-0.
- Kumaraswamy, P. R. Historical dictionary of the Arab-Israeli conflict. Scarecrow Press, 2006. ISBN 0-8108-5343-4.
- Kushner, Harvey W (2002). Encyclopedia of Terrorism (Hardcover). Thousand Oaks, California: Sage Publications, Inc. ISBN 978-0-7619-2408-1.
- Lentz, Harris. Assassinations and Executions: An Encyclopedia of Political Violence 1865–1986. McFarland, 1988.
- Pilch, Richard F., Raymond A. Zilinskas. Encyclopedia of bioterrorism defense. Wiley-LISS, 2005. ISBN 0-471-46717-0.
- Thackrah, John Richard. Encyclopedia of Terrorism and Political Violence. Routledge, 1987.

=== United States military history ===
- Beede, Benjamin R. The War of 1898 and U.S. interventions, 1898–1934: An encyclopedia. Garland, 1994. ISBN 0-8240-5624-8.
- Chambers, John Whiteclay, Fred Anderson. The Oxford companion to American military history. Oxford University Press, 1999. ISBN 0-19-507198-0.
- Congressional Medal of Honor Society. Congressional Medal of Honor Society. Available online here.
- Heidler, David Stephen, Jeanne T. Heidler. Encyclopedia of the War of 1812. ABC-CLIO, 1997. ISBN 0-87436-968-1.
- Roberts, Robert. Encyclopedia of Historic Forts: The Military Pioneer and Trading Posts of the United States. Macmillan, 1987.
- Schrader, Charles R. Reference Guide to United States Military History. Facts on File, 1991.
- Tucker, Spencer D., James Arnold, Roberta Wiener, Paul G. Pierpaoli, Jack McCallum, Justin D. Murphy. The encyclopedia of the Spanish-American and Philippine-American wars: A political, social, and military history. ABC-CLIO, 2009. ISBN 978-1-85109-951-1.

==== American Revolution ====
- Blanco, Richard L. American Revolution: An Encyclopedia. Garland, 1993.
- Boatner, Mark Mayo. Encyclopedia of the American Revolution. McKay, 1974.
- Fremont-Barnes, Gregory, Richard Alan Ryerson, James A. Arnold. The encyclopedia of the American Revolutionary War: A political, social, and military history. ABC-CLIO, 2006. ISBN 978-1-85109-408-0.
- Greene, Jack and J. R. Pole. Blackwell Encyclopedia of the American Revolution. Blackwell, 1991.
- Purcell, L. Edward. Who was who in the American Revolution. Facts on File, 1993. ISBN 0-8160-2107-4.
- Selesky, Harold E. and Mark Mayo Boatner. Encyclopedia of the American Revolution: Library of military history. Charles Scribner's Sons, 2006. ISBN 0-684-31513-0.

==== American Civil War ====
- American Civil War homepage. . George H. Hoemann, 2004.
- Boatner, Mark Mayo, rev. ed. by McKay. Civil War Dictionary. Random House, 1988.
- Bowman, John. Civil War Almanac. Facts on File, 1982.
- Current, Richard Nelson, Paul D. Escott. Encyclopedia of the Confederacy. Simon & Schuster, 1993–. ISBN 0-13-275991-8.
- Denney, Robert E., Gregory J. W. Urwin. The Civil War years: A day-by-day chronicle of the life of a nation. Sterling, 1992. ISBN 0-8069-8519-4.
- Faust, Patricia L. Historical Times Illustrated Encyclopedia of the Civil War. HarperCollins, 1986.
- Heidler, David Stephen, Jeanne T. Heidler, David J Coles. Encyclopedia of the American Civil War: A political, social, and military history. ABC-CLIO, 2000. ISBN 1-57607-066-2.
- Monroe, Dan, Bruce Tap. Shapers of the great debate on the Civil War: A biographical dictionary. Greenwood Press, 2005. ISBN 0-313-31745-3.
- Ritter, Charles F., Jon L. Wakelyn. Leaders of the American Civil War: A biographical and historiographical dictionary. Greenwood Press, 1998. ISBN 0-313-29560-3.
- Wagner, Margaret E., Gary W. Gallagher, Paul Finkelman. The Library of Congress Civil War desk reference. Simon & Schuster, 2002. ISBN 0-684-86350-2.
- Wright, John D. The Routledge encyclopedia of Civil War era biographies. Routledge, 2013. ISBN 978-0-415-87803-6.

=== Korean War ===
- Lentz, Robert J. Korean War filmography: 91 English language features through 2000. McFarland, 2003. ISBN 0-7864-1046-9.
- Matray, James. Historical Dictionary of the Korean War. Greenwood, 1991.
- Summers, Harry G. Korean War Almanac. Facts on File, 1990.
- Spencer Tucker, Paul G. Pierpaoli, Jinwung Kim, Xiaobing Li, James Irving Matray. The encyclopedia of the Korean War: A political, social, and military history. ABC-CLIO, 2010. ISBN 978-1-85109-849-1.

=== Vietnam War ===
- Anderson, David L. The Columbia guide to the Vietnam War. Columbia University Press, 2002. ISBN 0-231-11492-3.
- Frankum, Ronald Bruce. Historical dictionary of the war in Vietnam. Scarecrow Press, 2011. ISBN 978-0-8108-6796-3.
- Kutler, Stanley. Encyclopedia of the Vietnam War. Simon & Schuster, 1994.
- Olson, James S. Dictionary of the Vietnam War. Greenwood, 1988.
- Summers, Harry. Vietnam War Almanac. Facts on File, 1985.
- Tucker, Spencer C, Paul G. Pierpaoli Jr., Merle L. Pribbenow II, James H. Willbanks, David T. Zabecki. The encyclopedia of the Vietnam War: A political, social, and military history. ABC-CLIO, 2011. ISBN 978-1-85109-960-3.

=== World War I ===
- Bourne, J. M. Who's who in World War One. Routledge, 2001. ISBN 0-415-14179-6.
- Ciment, James, Thaddeus Russell. The home front encyclopedia: United States, Britain, and Canada in World Wars I and II. ABC-CLIO, 2007. ISBN 978-1-57607-849-5.
- Nicolson, Colin. Longman companion to the First World War: Europe, 1914–1918. Longman, 2000. ISBN 0-582-28982-3.
- Pope, Stephen, Elizabeth-Anne Wheal, Keith Robbins. The dictionary of the First World War. St. Martin's Press, 1995. ISBN 0-312-12931-9.
- Tucker, Spencer, Priscilla Mary Roberts, Cole C. Kingseed. World War I: Encyclopedia. ABC-CLIO, 2005. ISBN 1-85109-420-2.
- Young, Peter & Barry Pitt. The Marshall Cavendish Illustrated Encyclopedia of World War I. Marshall Cavendish, 1984.

=== World War II ===
- Brinkley, Douglas, Michael E. Haskew, Eisenhower Center for American Studies. The World War II desk reference. HarperResource, 2004. ISBN 0-06-052651-3.
- Ciment, James, Thaddeus Russell. The home front encyclopedia: United States, Britain, and Canada in World Wars I and II. ABC-CLIO, 2007. ISBN 978-1-57607-849-5.
- D-Day Encyclopedia.Simon & Schuster, 1993.
- Dictionary of the Second World War. Peter Bedrick Books, 1990.
- Epstein, Eric Joseph, Philip Rosen, Henry R. Huttenbach. Dictionary of the Holocaust: Biography, geography, and terminology. Greenwood Press, 1997. ISBN 0-313-30355-X.
- Hogg, Ian V., Bryan Perrett. Encyclopaedia of the Second World War. Presidio Press, 1989. ISBN 0-89141-362-6.
- Louis L Snyder's Historical Guide to World War II. Greenwood, 1982.
- Parrish, Thomas, S. L. A. Marshall. The Simon and Schuster encyclopedia of World War II. Simon and Schuster, 1978. ISBN 0-671-24277-6.
- Perrett, Bryan and Ian Hogg. Encyclopedia of the Second World War. Presidio Press, 1989.
- Post, Peter, William H. Frederick, Iris Heidebrink, Shigeru Satō, William Bradley Horton, Didi Kwartanada, Nederlands Instituut voor Oorlogsdocumentatie. The encyclopedia of Indonesia in the Pacific War. Brill, 2010. ISBN 978-90-04-16866-4.
- Tucker, Spencer C., Priscilla Mary Roberts, Allan R. Millett. Encyclopedia of World War II: A political, social, and military history. ABC-CLIO, 2005. ISBN 1-57607-999-6.
- Young, Peter. The Marshall Cavendish Illustrated Encyclopedia of World War II: An Objective Chronological and Comprehensive History of the Second World War. Revised ed, Marshall Cavendish, 1985.
