= List of Beast Quest novels =

This is a list of all published books in the Beast Quest series by Working Partners Limited. All books were written under the collective pen name Adam Blade, and the names of the ghostwriters are listed where known.

== Beast Quest main series in order ==
#	Title	Series title	First published	ISBN	Publisher	Ghostwriter	Illustrator
1	Ferno the Fire Dragon	Series 1: Where It All Began	2007	ISBN 978-1-846-16483-5	Orchard Books & Walker Books	Stephen Cole	Tristan Lewis
2	Sepron the Sea Serpent	Series 1: Where It All Began	2007	ISBN 978-1-846-16482-8	Orchard Books & Walker Books	Cherith Baldry	
3	Arcta the Mountain Giant	Series 1: Where It All Began	2007	ISBN 978-1-846-16484-2	Orchard Books & Walker Books	Michael Ford	
4	Tagus the Horse-Man	Series 1: Where It All Began	2007	ISBN 978-1-846-16486-6	Orchard Books & Walker Books	Cherith Baldry	
5	Nanook the Snow Monster	Series 1: Where It All Began	2007	ISBN 978-1-846-16485-9	Orchard Books & Walker Books	Stephen Cole	
6	Epos the Flame Bird	Series 1: Where It All Began	2007	ISBN 978-1-846-16487-3	Orchard Books & Walker Books	Stephen Cole	
7	Zepha the Monster Squid	Series 2: The Golden Armour	2008	ISBN 978-1-846-16988-5	Orchard Books	Cherith Baldry	Steve Sims
8	Claw the Giant Monkey	Series 2: The Golden Armour	2008	ISBN 978-1-846-16989-2	Orchard Books	Lucy Courtenay	
9	Soltra the Stone Charmer	Series 2: The Golden Armour	2008	ISBN 978-1-846-16990-8	Orchard Books	Allan Frewin Jones	Steve Sims
10	Vipero the Snake Man	Series 2: The Golden Armour	2008	ISBN 978-1-846-16991-5	Orchard Books	Cherith Baldry	Steve Sims
11	Arachnid the King of Spiders	Series 2: The Golden Armour	2008	ISBN 978-1-846-16992-2	Orchard Books	Lucy Courtenay	Steve Sims
12	Trillion the Three-Headed Lion	Series 2: The Golden Armour	2008	ISBN 978-1-846-16993-9	Orchard Books	Allan Frewin Jones	
13	Torgor the Minotaur	Series 3: The Dark Realm	2008	ISBN 978-1-846-16997-7	Orchard Books	Cherith Baldry	Steve Sims
14	Skor the Winged Stallion	Series 3: The Dark Realm	2008	ISBN 978-1-846-16998-4	Orchard Books	Michael Ford	
15	Narga the Sea Monster	Series 3: The Dark Realm	2008	ISBN 978-1-408-30000-8	Orchard Books	Cherith Baldry	Steve Sims
16	Kaymon the Gorgon Hound	Series 3: The Dark Realm	2008	ISBN 978-1-408-30001-5	Orchard Books	Allan Frewin Jones	
17	Tusk the Mighty Mammoth	Series 3: The Dark Realm	2008	ISBN 978-1-408-30002-2	Orchard Books	Allan Frewin Jones	Steve Sims
18	Sting the Scorpion Man	Series 3: The Dark Realm	2008	ISBN 978-1-408-30003-9	Orchard Books	Lucy Courtenay	Steve Sims
19	Nixa the Death-Bringer	Series 4: The Amulet of Avantia	2009	ISBN 978-1-408-30376-4	Orchard Books	Cherith Baldry	Steve Sims
20	Equinus the Spirit Horse	Series 4: The Amulet of Avantia	2009	ISBN 978-1-408-30377-1	Orchard Books	Jan Burchett and Sara Vogler	
21	Rashouk the Cave Troll	Series 4: The Amulet of Avantia	2009	ISBN 978-1-408-30378-8	Orchard Books	James Noble	Steve Sims
22	Luna the Moon Wolf	Series 4: The Amulet of Avantia	2009	ISBN 978-1-408-30379-5	Orchard Books	Brandon Robshaw	
23	Blaze the Ice Dragon	Series 4: The Amulet of Avantia	2009	ISBN 978-1-408-30381-8	Orchard Books	Michael Ford	
24	Stealth the Ghost Panther	Series 4: The Amulet of Avantia	2009	ISBN 978-1-408-30380-1	Orchard Books	Cherith Baldry	Steve Sims
25	Krabb Master of the Sea	Series 5: The Shade of Death	2009	ISBN 978-1-408-30437-2	Orchard Books	Michael Ford	Steve Sims
26	Hawkite Arrow of the Air	Series 5: The Shade of Death	2009	ISBN 978-1-408-30438-9	Orchard Books	Lucy Courtenay	
27	Rokk the Walking Mountain	Series 5: The Shade of Death	2009	ISBN 978-1-408-30439-6	Orchard Books	James Noble	Steve Sims
28	Koldo the Arctic Warrior	Series 5: The Shade of Death	2009	ISBN 978-1-408-30440-2	Orchard Books	Michael Ford	Steve Sims
29	Trema the Earth Lord	Series 5: The Shade of Death	2009	ISBN 978-1-408-30441-9	Orchard Books	Cherith Baldry	
30	Amictus the Bug Queen	Series 5: The Shade of Death	2009	ISBN 978-1-408-30442-6	Orchard Books	Karen Ball	Steve Sims
31	Komodo the Lizard King	Series 6: The World of Chaos	2010	ISBN 978-1-408-30723-6	Orchard Books	Michael Ford	Steve Sims
32	Muro the Rat Monster	Series 6: The World of Chaos	2010	ISBN 978-1-408-30724-3	Orchard Books	Thea Bennett	Steve Sims
33	Fang the Bat Fiend	Series 6: The World of Chaos	2010	ISBN 978-1-408-30725-0	Orchard Books	Cherith Baldry	Steve Sims
34	Murk the Swamp Man	Series 6: The World of Chaos	2010	ISBN 978-1-408-30726-7	Orchard Books	J.N. Richards	Steve Sims
35	Terra Curse of the Forest	Series 6: The World of Chaos	2010	ISBN 978-1-408-30727-4	Orchard Books	Michael Ford	Steve Sims
36	Vespick the Wasp Queen	Series 6: The World of Chaos	2010	ISBN 978-1-408-30728-1	Orchard Books	Cherith Baldry	Steve Sims
37	Convol the Cold-Blooded Brute	Series 7: The Lost World	2010	ISBN 978-1-408-30729-8	Michael Ford	Steve Sims	
38	Hellion the Fiery Foe	Series 7: The Lost World	2010	ISBN 978-1-408-30730-4	Lucy Courtenay		
39	Krestor the Crushing Terror	Series 7: The Lost World	2010	ISBN 978-1-408-30731-1	J.N. Richards	Steve Sims	
40	Madara the Midnight Warrior	Series 7: The Lost World	2010	ISBN 978-1-408-30732-8	Allan Frewin Jones	Steve Sims	
41	Ellik the Lightning Horror	Series 7: The Lost World	2010	ISBN 978-1-408-30733-5	Lucy Courtenay		
42	Carnivora the Winged Scavenger	Series 7: The Lost World	2010	ISBN 978-1-408-30734-2	Cherith Baldry	Steve Sims	
43	Balisk the Water Snake	Series 8: The Pirate King	2011	ISBN 978-1-408-31310-7	Orchard Books	Michael Ford	Steve Sims
44	Koron Jaws of Death	Series 8: The Pirate King	2011	ISBN 978-1-408-31311-4	Orchard Books	Allan Frewin Jones	Steve Sims
45	Hecton the Body Snatcher	Series 8: The Pirate King	2011	ISBN 978-1-408-31312-1	Orchard Books	Elizabeth Galloway	Steve Sims
46	Torno the Hurricane Dragon	Series 8: The Pirate King	2011	ISBN 978-1-408-31313-8	Orchard Books	Cherith Baldry	
47	Kronus the Clawed Menace	Series 8: The Pirate King	2011	ISBN 978-1-408-31314-5	Orchard Books	Allan Frewin Jones	Steve Sims
48	Bloodboar the Buried Doom	Series 8: The Pirate King	2011	ISBN 978-1-408-31315-2	Orchard Books	J. N. Richards	Steve Sims
49	Ursus the Clawed Roar	Series 9: The Warlock's Staff	2011	ISBN 978-1-408-31316-9	Orchard Books	Michael Ford	Steve Sims
50	Minos the Demon Bull	Series 9: The Warlock's Staff	2011	ISBN 978-1-408-31317-6	Orchard Books	Allan Frewin Jones	
51	Koraka the Winged Assassin	Series 9: The Warlock's Staff	2011	ISBN 978-1-408-31318-3	Orchard Books	Cherith Baldry	Steve Sims
52	Silver the Wild Terror	Series 9: The Warlock's Staff	2011	ISBN 978-1-408-31319-0	Orchard Books	Allan Frewin Jones	
53	Spikefin the Water King	Series 9: The Warlock's Staff	2011	ISBN 978-1-408-31320-6	Orchard Books	Stephen Chambers	Steve Sims
54	Torpix the Twisting Serpent	Series 9: The Warlock's Staff	2011	ISBN 978-1-408-31321-3	Orchard Books	J.N. Richards	Steve Sims
55	Noctila the Death Owl	Series 10: Master of the Beasts	2012	ISBN 978-1-408-31518-7	Orchard Books	Michael Ford	Steve Sims
56	Shamani the Raging Flame	Series 10: Master of the Beasts	2012	ISBN 978-1-408-31519-4	Orchard Books	Allan Frewin Jones	
57	Lustor the Acid Dart	Series 10: Master of the Beasts	2012	ISBN 978-1-408-31520-0	Orchard Books	Troon Harrison	Steve Sims
58	Voltrex the Two-Headed Octopus	Series 10: Master of the Beasts	2012	ISBN 978-1-408-31521-7	Orchard Books	Allan Frewin Jones	
59	Tecton the Armoured Giant	Series 10: Master of the Beasts	2012	ISBN 978-1-408-31522-4	Orchard Books	Ellen Renner	Steve Sims
60	Doomskull the King of Fear	Series 10: Master of the Beasts	2012	ISBN 978-1-408-31523-1	Orchard Books	Troon Harrison	
61	Elko Lord of the Sea	Series 11: The New Age	2012	ISBN 978-1-408-32556-8	Orchard Books	Michael Ford	Steve Sims
62	Tarrok the Blood Spike	Series 11: The New Age	2012	ISBN 978-1-408-32557-5	Orchard Books	Troon Harrison	
63	Brutus the Hound of Horror	Series 11: The New Age	2012	ISBN 978-1-408-32558-2	Orchard Books	Allan Frewin Jones	Steve Sims
64	Flaymar the Scorched Blaze	Series 11: The New Age	2012	ISBN 978-1-408-32556-8	Orchard Books	Michael Ford	
65	Serpio the Slithering Shadow	Series 11: The New Age	2012	ISBN 978-1-408-32560-5	Orchard Books	Allan Frewin Jones	Steve Sims
66	Tauron the Pounding Fury	Series 11: The New Age	2012	ISBN 978-1-408-32561-2	Orchard Books	Troon Harrison	
67	Solak Scourge of the Sea	Series 12: The Darkest Hour	2013	ISBN 978-1-408-32703-6	Orchard Books	Michael Ford	Steve Sims
68	Kajin the Beast Catcher	Series 12: The Darkest Hour	2013	ISBN 978-1-408-32704-3	Orchard Books	Troon Harrison	Steve Sims
69	Issrilla the Creeping Menace	Series 12: The Darkest Hour	2013	ISBN 978-1-408-32705-0	Orchard Books	Tabitha Jones	
70	Vigrash the Clawed Eagle	Series 12: The Darkest Hour	2013	ISBN 978-1-408-32706-7	Orchard Books	Allan Frewin Jones	Steve Sims
71	Mirka the Ice Horse	Series 12: The Darkest Hour	2013	ISBN 978-1-408-32707-4	Orchard Books	Troon Harrison	
72	Kama the Faceless Beast	Series 12: The Darkest Hour	2013	ISBN 978-1-408-32708-1	Orchard Books	Allan Frewin Jones	Steve Sims
73	Skurik the Forest Demon	Series 13: The Warrior's Road	2013	ISBN 978-1-408-32402-8	Orchard Books	Michael Ford	Steve Sims
74	Targro the Arctic Menace	Series 13: The Warrior's Road	2013	ISBN 978-1-408-32403-5	Orchard Books	Gillian Philip	
75	Slivka the Cold-Hearted Curse	Series 13: The Warrior's Road	2013	ISBN 978-1-408-32404-2	Orchard Books	Michael Ford	Steve Sims
76	Linka the Sky Conqueror	Series 13: The Warrior's Road	2013	ISBN 978-1-408-32405-9	Orchard Books	Tabitha Jones	
77	Vermok the Spiteful Scavenger	Series 13: The Warrior's Road	2013	ISBN 978-1-408-32406-6	Orchard Books	Gillian Philip	Steve Sims
78	Koba Ghoul of the Shadows	Series 13: The Warrior's Road	2013	ISBN 978-1-408-32407-3	Orchard Books	Allan Frewin Jones	
79	Raffkor the Stampeding Brute	Series 14: The Cursed Dragon	2014	ISBN 978-1-408-32920-7	Orchard Books	Michael Ford	Steve Sims
80	Vislak the Slithering Serpent	Series 14: The Cursed Dragon	2014	ISBN 978-1-408-32921-4	Orchard Books	Tabitha Jones	Steve Sims
81	Tikron the Jungle Master	Series 14: The Cursed Dragon	2014	ISBN 978-1-408-32922-1	Orchard Books	Allan Frewin Jones	Steve Sims
82	Falra the Snow Phoenix	Series 14: The Cursed Dragon	2014	ISBN 978-1-408-32923-8	Orchard Books	Michael Ford	Steve Sims
83	Wardok the Sky Terror	Series 15: Velmal's Revenge	2015	ISBN 978-1-408-33487-4	Orchard Books	Conrad Mason	Steve Sims
84	Xerik the Bone Cruncher	Series 15: Velmal's Revenge	2015	ISBN 978-1-408-33489-8	Orchard Books	Tabitha Jones	Steve Sims
85	Plexor the Raging Reptile	Series 15: Velmal's Revenge	2015	ISBN 978-1-408-33491-1	Orchard Books	Allan Frewin Jones	Steve Sims
86	Quagos the Armoured Beetle	Series 15: Velmal's Revenge	2015	ISBN 978-1-408-33493-5	Orchard Books	Tabitha Jones	Steve Sims
87	Styro the Snapping Brute	Series 16: The Siege of Gwildor	2015	ISBN 978-1-408-33986-2	Orchard Books	Tabitha Jones	Steve Sims
88	Ronak the Toxic Terror	Series 16: The Siege of Gwildor	2015	ISBN 978-1-408-33996-1	Orchard Books	Conrad Mason	
89	Solix the Deadly Swarm	Series 16: The Siege of Gwildor	2015	ISBN 978-1-408-33988-6	Orchard Books	Tabitha Jones	Steve Sims
90	Kanis the Shadow Hound	Series 16: The Siege of Gwildor	2015	ISBN 978-1-408-33994-7	Orchard Books	Conrad Mason	Steve Sims
91	Gryph the Feathered Fiend	Series 17: The Broken Star	2016	ISBN 978-1-408-34076-9	Orchard Books	Tabitha Jones	Steve Sims
92	Thoron the Living Storm	Series 17: The Broken Star	2016	ISBN 978-1-408-34080-6	Orchard Books	J.N. Richards	
93	Okko the Sand Monster	Series 17: The Broken Star	2016	ISBN 978-1-408-34082-0	Orchard Books	Tom Easton	Steve Sims
94	Saurex the Silent Creeper	Series 17: The Broken Star	2016	ISBN 978-1-408-34084-4	Orchard Books	Allan Frewin Jones	
95	Krytor the Blood Bat	Series 18: The Trial of Heroes	2016	ISBN 978-1-408-34086-8	Orchard Books	Jasmine Richards	Steve Sims
96	Soara the Stinging Spectre	Series 18: The Trial of Heroes	2016	ISBN 978-1-408-34088-2	Orchard Books	Tabitha Jones	Steve Sims
97	Drogan the Jungle Menace	Series 18: The Trial of Heroes	2016	ISBN 978-1-408-34295-4	Orchard Books	Allan Frewin Jones	Steve Sims
98	Karixa the Diamond Warrior	Series 18: The Trial of Heroes	2016	ISBN 978-1-408-34309-8	Orchard Books	Tabitha Jones	Steve Sims
99	Quarg the Stone Dragon	Series 19: The Kingdom of Dragons	2017	ISBN 978-1-408-34311-1	Orchard Books	Tabitha Jones	Steve Sims
100	Korvax the Sea Dragon	Series 19: The Kingdom of Dragons	2017	ISBN 978-1-408-34313-5	Orchard Books	Allan Frewin Jones	Steve Sims
101	Vetrix the Poison Dragon	Series 19: The Kingdom of Dragons	2017	ISBN 978-1-408-34315-9	Orchard Books	Tabitha Jones	Steve Sims
102	Strytor the Skeleton Dragon	Series 19: The Kingdom of Dragons	2017	ISBN 978-1-408-34317-3	Orchard Books	Conrad Mason	Steve Sims
103	Zulok the Winged Spirit	Series 20: The Isle of Ghosts	2017	ISBN 978-1-408-34319-7	Orchard Books	Tabitha Jones	Steve Sims
104	Skalix the Snapping Horror	Series 20: The Isle of Ghosts	2017	ISBN 978-1-408-34321-0	Orchard Books	Allan Frewin Jones	Steve Sims
105	Okira the Crusher	Series 20: The Isle of Ghosts	2017	ISBN 978-1-408-34323-4	Orchard Books	Tabitha Jones	Steve Sims
106	Rykar the Fire Hound	Series 20: The Isle of Ghosts	2017	ISBN 978-1-40834325-8	Orchard Books	Conrad Mason	Steve Sims
107	Grymon the Biting Horror	Series 21: The Sorcerer's Revenge	2018	ISBN 978-1-408-34327-2	Orchard Books	Allan Frewin Jones	Steve Sims
108	Skrar the Night Scavenger	Series 21: The Sorcerer's Revenge	2018	ISBN 978-1-408-34329-6	Orchard Books	Conrad Mason	Steve Sims
109	Tarantix the Bone Spider	Series 21: The Sorcerer's Revenge	2018	ISBN 978-1-408-34331-9	Orchard Books	Tabitha Jones	Steve Sims
110	Lypida the Shadow Fiend	Series 21: The Sorcerer's Revenge	2018	ISBN 978-1-408-34333-3	Orchard Books	Conrad Mason	Steve Sims
111	Menox the Sabre-Toothed Terror	Series 22: The Lost Beasts of Makai	2018	ISBN 978-1-408-34336-4	Orchard Books	Tabitha Jones	Steve Sims
112	Larnak the Swarming Menace	Series 22: The Lost Beasts of Makai	2018	ISBN 978-1-408-34337-1	Orchard Books	J.N. Richards	Steve Sims
113	Jurog Hammer of the Jungle	Series 22: The Lost Beasts of Makai	2018	ISBN 978-1-408-34339-5	Orchard Books	Tabitha Jones	Steve Sims
114	Nersepha the Cursed Siren	Series 22: The Lost Beasts of Makai	2018	ISBN 978-1-408-34341-8	Orchard Books	Conrad Mason	Steve Sims
115	Querzol the Swamp Monster	Series 23: The Shattered Kingdom	2019	ISBN 978-1-408-34344-9	Orchard Books	Tabitha Jones	Steve Sims
116	Krotax the Tusked Destroyer	Series 23: The Shattered Kingdom	2019	ISBN 978-1-408-34345-6	Orchard Books	Allan Frewin Jones	Steve Sims
117	Torka the Sky Snatcher	Series 23: The Shattered Kingdom	2019	ISBN 978-1-408-34347-0	Orchard Books	Tabitha Jones	Steve Sims
118	Xerkan the Shape Stealer	Series 23: The Shattered Kingdom	2019	ISBN 978-1-408-34349-4	Orchard Books	Conrad Mason	Steve Sims
119	Electro the Storm Bird	Series 24: Blood of the Beast	2019	ISBN 978-1-408-35774-3	Orchard Books	Tabitha Jones	Steve Sims
120	Fluger the Sightless Slitherer	Series 24: Blood of the Beast	2019	ISBN 978-1-408-35777-4	Orchard Books	Allan Frewin Jones	Steve Sims
121	Morax the Wrecking Menace	Series 24: Blood of the Beast	2019	ISBN 978-1-408-35779-8	Orchard Books	Tabitha Jones	Steve Sims
122	Krokol the Father of Fear	Series 24: Blood of the Beast	2019	ISBN 978-1-408-35781-1	Orchard Books	Corad Mason	Steve Sims
123	Akorta the All-Seeing Ape	Series 25: The Prison Kingdom	2020	ISBN 978-1-408-36137-5	Orchard Books		Steve Sims
124	Lycaxa Hunter of the Peaks	Series 25: The Prison Kingdom	2020	ISBN 978-1-408-36186-3	Orchard Books		Steve Sims
125	Glaki Spear of the Depths	Series 25: The Prison Kingdom	2020	ISBN 978-1-408-36188-7	Orchard Books		Steve Sims
126	Diprox the Buzzing Terror	Series 25: The Prison Kingdom	2020	ISBN 978-1-408-36190-0	Orchard Books		Steve Sims
127	Teknos the Ocean Crawler	Series 26: The Four Masters	2021	ISBN 978-1-408-36214-3	Orchard Books		Steve Sims
128	Mallix the Silent Stalker	Series 26: The Four Masters	2021	ISBN 978-1-408-36217-4	Orchard Books		Steve Sims
129	Silexa the Stone Cat	Series 26: The Four Masters	2021	ISBN 978-1-408-36218-1	Orchard Books		Steve Sims
130	Kyron Lord of Fire	Series 26: The Four Masters	2021	ISBN 978-1-408-36220-4	Orchard Books		Steve Sims
131	Gorog the Fiery Fiend	Series 27: The Ghost of Karadin	2021	ISBN 978-1-408-36526-7	Orchard Books		Steve Sims
132	Devora the Death Fish	Series 27: The Ghost of Karadin	2021	ISBN 978-1-408-36529-8	Orchard Books		Steve Sims
133	Raptex the Sky Hunter	Series 27: The Ghost of Karadin	2021	ISBN 978-1-408-36532-8	Orchard Books		Steve Sims
134	Gargantua the Silent Assassin	Series 27: The Ghost of Karadin	2021	ISBN 978-1-408-36534-2	Orchard Books		Steve Sims
135	Ossiron the Fleshless Killer	Series 28: The Netherworld	2022	ISBN 978-1-408-36536-6	Orchard Books		Steve Sims
136	Styx the Lurking Terror	Series 28: The Netherworld	2022	ISBN 978-1-408-36538-0	Orchard Books		Steve Sims
137	Kaptiva the Shrieking Siren	Series 28: The Netherworld	2022	ISBN 978-1-408-36540-3	Orchard Books		Steve Sims
138	Velakro the Lightning Bird	Series 28: The Netherworld	2022	ISBN 978-1-408-36542-7	Orchard Books		Steve Sims
139	Kalderon the Iron Bear	Series 29: The New Protectors	2022	ISBN 978-1-408-36742-1	Orchard Books		Steve Sims
140	Garox the Coral Giant	Series 29: The New Protectors	2022	ISBN 978-1-408-36744-5	Orchard Books		Steve Sims
141	Draka the Winged Serpent	Series 29: The New Protectors	2022	ISBN 978-1-408-36746-9	Orchard Books		Steve Sims
142	Lukor the Forest Guardian	Series 29: The New Protectors	2022	ISBN 978-1-408-36748-3	Orchard Books		Steve Sims
143	Hyrix the Rock Smasher	Series 30: The Shape-Shifters	2023	ISBN 978-1-408-36967-8	Orchard Books		Steve Sims
144	Makoro the Blinding Stinger	Series 30: The Shape-Shifters	2023	ISBN 978-1-408-36969-2	Orchard Books		Steve Sims
145	Leptika the Nocturnal Nightmare	Series 30: The Shape-Shifters	2023	ISBN 978-1-408-36971-5	Orchard Books		Steve Sims
146	Selkara Monster of the Depths	Series 30: The Shape-Shifters	2023	ISBN 978-1-408-36973-9	Orchard Books		Steve Sims
147	Lupix the Ice Wolf	Series 31: Guardians of Tangala	2024	ISBN 978-1-408-37182-4	Orchard Books		Steve Sims
148	Pirano the Water Dragon	Series 31: Guardians of Tangala	2024	ISBN 978-1-408-37193-0	Orchard Books		Steve Sims
149	Heraxor the Fire Hawk	Series 31: Guardians of Tangala	2024	ISBN 978-1-408-37195-4	Orchard Books		Steve Sims
150	Petrok the Stone Warrior	Series 31: Guardians of Tangala	2024	ISBN 978-1-408-37197-8	Orchard Books		Steve Sims
151	Dolrus the Spiked Destroyer	Series 32: Battle on Kerodor	2025	ISBN 978-1-408-37199-2	Orchard Books		Steve Sims
152	Zynara the Striped Prowler	Series 32: Battle on Kerodor	2025	ISBN 978-1-408-37201-2	Orchard Books		Steve Sims
153	Makroxa the Tunnelling Terror	Series 32: Battle on Kerodor	2025	ISBN 978-1-408-37203-6	Orchard Books		Steve Sims
154	Kyropta the Skeleton Eagle	Series 32: Battle on Kerodor	2025	ISBN 978-1-408-37201-2	Orchard Books		Steve Sims

== Beast Quest Special Bumper Editions ==
#	Title	First published	ISBN	Publisher	Ghostwriter	Illustrator
1	Vedra and Krimon: Twin Beasts of Avantia	2008	ISBN 978-0-545-39774-2	Orchard Books	Allan Frewin Jones	
2	Spiros the Ghost Phoenix	2008	ISBN 978-0-545-13267-1	Orchard Books	Michael Ford	
3	Arax the Soul Stealer	2009	ISBN 978-1-408-30382-5	Orchard Books	Jan Burchett and Sara Vogler	Steve Sims
4	Kragos and Kildor: the Two-Headed Demon	2009	ISBN 978-1-408-30436-5	Orchard Books	Cherith Baldry	Steve Sims
5	Creta the Winged Terror	2010	ISBN 978-1-408-30735-9	Orchard Books	Lucy Courtenay	Steve Sims
6	Mortaxe the Skeleton Warrior	2010	ISBN 978-1-408-30736-6	Orchard Books	Michael Ford	Steve Sims
7	Ravira Ruler of the Underworld	2011	ISBN 978-1-408-31322-0	Orchard Books	Michael Ford	
8	Raksha the Mirror Demon	2011	ISBN 978-1-408-31323-7	Orchard Books	Michael Ford	Steve Sims
9	Grashkor the Beast Guard	2012	ISBN 978-1-408-31517-0	Orchard Books	Michael Ford	
10	Ferrok the Iron Soldier	2012	ISBN 978-1-408-31847-8	Orchard Books	Michael Ford	Steve Sims
11	Viktor the Deadly Archer	2013	ISBN 978-1-408-32408-0	Orchard Books	Michael Ford	Steve Sims
12	Anoret the First Beast	2013	ISBN 978-1-408-32410-3	Orchard Books	Michael Ford	Steve Sims
13	Okawa the River Beast	2014	ISBN 978-1-408-32928-3	Orchard Books	Cherith Baldry	Steve Sims
14	Skolo the Bladed Monster	2014	ISBN 978-1-408-32930-6	Orchard Books	Lucy Courtenay	Steve Sims
15	Jakara the Ghost Warrior	2015	ISBN 978-1-408-33497-3	Orchard Books	Michael Ford	Steve Sims
16	Yakorix the Ice Bear	2015	ISBN 978-1-408-33495-9	Orchard Books	Tabitha Jones	Steve Sims
17	Tempra the Time Stealer	2016	ISBN 978-1-408-34078-3	Orchard Books	Tabitha Jones	Steve Sims
18	Falkor the Coiled Terror	2016	ISBN 978-1-408-34297-8	Orchard Books	Michael Ford	Steve Sims
19	Kyrax the Metal Warrior	2017	ISBN 978-1-408-34299-2	Orchard Books	Tabitha Jones	
20	Magror Ogre of the Swamps	2017	ISBN 978-1-408-34301-2	Orchard Books	Michael Ford	Steve Sims
21	Verak the Storm King	2018	ISBN 978-1-408-34303-6	Orchard Books	Michael Ford	Steve Sims
22	Ospira the Savage Sorceress	2018	ISBN 978-1-408-34305-0	Orchard Books	Tabitha Jones	Steve Sims
23	Scalamanx the Fiery Fury	2019	ISBN 978-1-408-34307-4	Orchard Books	Michael Ford	Steve Sims
24	Petorix the Winged Slicer	2020	ISBN 978-1-408-35783-5	Orchard Books	Michael Ford	Steve Sims
25	Arkano the Stone Crawler	2020	ISBN 978-1-408-36135-1	Orchard Books	Tabitha Jones	
26	Bixara the Horned Dragon	2021	ISBN 978-1-408-36222-8	Orchard Books	Michael Ford	Steve Sims

Special of the World Book Day Special

#	Title	First published	ISBN	Publisher	Illustrator
1	Sephir the Storm Monster	2009	ISBN 978-5-555-00720-9	Orchard Books	Steve Sims

== Master Your Destiny series ==
The Master Your Destiny series is a series that lets the reader choose their own path, by turning to pages that decide a decision. Each book has ten different endings, eight of which are bad endings and two of which are the main endings. All three were written by the ghostwriter, Elizabeth Galloway.

Title	First published	ISBN	Publisher	Illustrator
The Dark Cauldron	2010	ISBN 978-1-408-30943-8	Orchard Books	Steve Sims
The Dagger of Doom	2011	ISBN 978-1-408-31406-7	Orchard Books	Steve Sims
The Pirate's Curse	2012	ISBN 978-1-408-31840-9	Orchard Books	Steve Sims

== Companion books ==
Title	First published	ISBN
Adventurer's Handbook	2010	ISBN 978-1-408-30944-5
Beast Quest Annual 2011	2011	ISBN 978-1-408-31261-2
Beast Quest Annual 2012	2012	ISBN 978-1-408-31405-0
A to Z of Beasts	2012	ISBN 978-1-408-31866-9

== The Chronicles of Avantia series ==
The Chronicles of Avantia series is a set of four books that take place several hundred years before the events of Beast Quest.

Title	First published	ISBN
First Hero	2010	ISBN 978-1-408-30747-2
Chasing Evil	2010	ISBN 978-1-408-30748-9
Call to War	2011	ISBN 978-1-408-30749-6
Fire and Fury	2011	ISBN 978-1-408-30750-2

== Battle of the Beasts series ==
In the Battle of the Beasts series, the main protagonist, Tom, starts a training camp where he invites some people who have performed heroic acts to help protect Avantia from evil. Each book has a different hero who uses a different beast to defeat a controlled beast.

Title	First published	ISBN	Ghostwriter
Ferno vs. Epos	2012	ISBN 978-1-408-31867-6	Edward Willet
Amictus vs. Tagus	2012	ISBN 978-1-408-31868-3	Troon Harrison
Sepron vs. Narga	2013	ISBN 978-1-408-32409-7	Michael Ford

== Sea Quest series ==
The Sea Quest series is a companion science fiction series with a new protagonist who battles robotic, marine creatures.

Title	Series	First published	ISBN
1 Cephalox the Cyber Squid	The First Adventures	2013	ISBN 978-1-408-31848-5
2 Silda the Electric Eel	The First Adventures	2013	ISBN 978-1-408-31849-2
3 Manak the Silent Predator	The First Adventures	2013	ISBN 978-1-408-31850-8
4 Kraya the Blood Shark	The First Adventures	2013	ISBN 978-1-408-31851-5
5 Shredder the Spider Droid	The Cavern of Ghosts	2013	ISBN 978-1-408-32411-0
6 Stinger the Sea Phantom	The Cavern of Ghosts	2013	ISBN 978-1-408-32412-7
7 Crusher the Creeping Terror	The Cavern of Ghosts	2013	ISBN 978-1-408-32413-4
8 Mangler the Dark Menace	The Cavern of Ghosts	2013	ISBN 978-1-408-32414-1
9 Tetrax the Swamp Crocodile	The Pride of Blackheart	2014	ISBN 978-1-408-32853-8
10 Nephro the Ice Lobster	The Pride of Blackheart	2014	ISBN 978-1-408-32855-2
11 Finaria the Savage Sea Snake	The Pride of Blackheart	2014	ISBN 978-1-408-32857-6
12 Chakrol the Ocean Hammer	The Pride of Blackheart	2014	ISBN 978-1-408-32859-0
13 Rekkar the Screeching Orca	The Lost Lagoon	2014	ISBN 978-1-408-32861-3
14 Tragg the Ice Bear	The Lost Lagoon	2014	ISBN 978-1-408-32863-7
15 Horvos the Horror Bird	The Lost Lagoon	2014	ISBN 978-1-408-32865-1
16 Gubbix the Poison Fish	The Lost Lagoon	2014	ISBN 978-1-408-32867-5
17 Sythid the Spider Crab	The Chaos Quadrant	2015	ISBN 978-1-408-33471-3
18 Brux the Tusked Terror	The Chaos Quadrant	2015	ISBN 978-1-408-33473-7
19 Venor the Sea Scorpion	The Chaos Quadrant	2015	ISBN 978-1-4083-3475-1
20 Monoth the Spiked Destroyer	The Chaos Quadrant	2015	ISBN 978-1-4083-3477-5
21 Fliktor the Deadly Conqueror	Master of Aquora	2015	ISBN 978-1-408-33480-5
22 Tengal the Savage Shark	Master of Aquora	2015	ISBN 978-1-408-33481-2
23 Kull the Cave Crawler	Master of Aquora	2015	ISBN 978-1-408-33483-6
24 Gulak the Gulper Eel	Master of Aquora	2015	ISBN 978-1-408-33485-0
25 Veloth the Vampire Squid	The Lost Starship	2016	ISBN 978-1-408-34064-6
26 Glendor the Stealthy Shadow	The Lost Starship	2016	ISBN 978-1-408-34066-0
27 Mirroc the Goblin Shark	The Lost Starship	2016	ISBN 978-1-408-34068-4
28 Blistra the Sea Dragon	The Lost Starship	2016	ISBN 978-1-408-34070-7
29 Gort the Deadly Snatcher	The Lord of Illusion	2016	ISBN 978-1-408-34090-5
30 Fangor the Crunching Giant	The Lord of Illusion	2016	ISBN 978-1-408-34099-8
31 Shelka the Mighty Fortress	The Lord of Illusion	2016	ISBN 978-1-408-34093-6
32 Loosejaw the Nightmare Fish	The Lord of Illusion	2016	ISBN 978-1-408-34095-0

== Sea Quest Special Bumper Editions ==
Title	First published	ISBN
1 Stengor the Crab Monster	2013	ISBN 978-1-408-31852-2
2 Skalda the Soul Stealer	2014	ISBN 978-1-4083-2851-4
3 Drakkos the Ocean King	2014	ISBN 978-1-408-31858-4
4 Octor Monster of the Deep	2015	ISBN 978-1-408-33467-6
5 Jandor the Arctic Lizard	2015	ISBN 978-1-408-33469-0
6 Repta the Spiked Brute	2016	ISBN 978-1-408-34072-1
7 Hydror the Ocean Hunter	2016	ISBN 978-1-408-34097-4

== Team Hero series ==
Title	Series	First published	ISBN
1 Battle for the Shadow Sword	The First Missions	2017	ISBN 978-1-408-34351-7
2 Attack of the Bat Army	The First Missions	2017	ISBN 978-1-408-34353-1
3 Reptile Reawakened	The First Missions	2017	ISBN 978-1-408-34355-5
4 The Skeleton Warrior	The First Missions	2017	ISBN 978-1-408-34357-9
5 Fight for the Hidden City	The Hidden City	2018	ISBN 978-1-408-34359-3
6 Scorpion Strike	The Hidden City	2018	ISBN 978-1-408-34362-3
7 Falcon of Fury	The Hidden City	2018	ISBN 978-1-408-34364-7
8 Rise of the Shadow Snakes	The Hidden City	2018	ISBN 978-1-408-34366-1
9 The Ice Wolves	The Dark Armies	2018	ISBN 978-1-408-35197-0
10 The Shadow Stallion	The Dark Armies	2018	ISBN 978-1-408-35207-6
11 Army of Darkness	The Dark Armies	2018	ISBN 978-1-408-35199-4
12 Revenge of the Dragon	The Dark Armies	2018	ISBN 978-1-408-35201-4
13 The Secret Jungle	The Ultimate Mission	2019	ISBN 978-1-408-35556-5
14 Ninja Strike	The Ultimate Mission	2019	ISBN 978-1-408-35558-9
15 The Night Thief	The Ultimate Mission	2019	ISBN 978-1-408-35560-2
16 An Army Awakens	The Ultimate Mission	2019	ISBN 978-1-408-35562-6

== Team Hero specials ==
Title	First published	ISBN
1 Lair of the Fire Lizard	2017	ISBN 978-1-408-34702-7
2 The Island of Doom	2018	ISBN 978-1-408-35203-8
3 Android Attack	2018	ISBN 978-1-408-35206-9
4 The Frozen Fortress	2019	ISBN 978-1-408-35564-0

== Beast Quest: New Blood ==
Title	First published	ISBN
1 The New Heroes	2019	ISBN 978-1-408-35785-9
2 The Dark Wizard	2019	ISBN 978-1-408-35787-3
3 The Lost Tomb	2020	ISBN 978-1-408-36141-2
4 The Ultimate Battle	2020	ISBN 978-1-408-36184-9

== Space Wars ==
Title	First published	ISBN
1 Curse of the Robo-Dragon	2021	ISBN 978-1-408-35789-7
2 Monster from the Void	2021	ISBN 978-1-408-35791-0
3 Cosmic Spider Attack	2022	ISBN 978-1-408-36800-8
4 Droid Dog Strike	2023	ISBN 978-1-408-36803-9

== Beast Quest Graphic Novel ==
Title	First published	ISBN
1 Rise of the Fire Dragon	2027	ISBN 978-1-536-25863-9
