= Fire and Fury (disambiguation) =

Fire and Fury: Inside the Trump White House is a 2018 book by Michael Wolff.

Fire and Fury may also refer to:

- Fire and Fury (game), a tabletop game based on the American Civil War
- "Fire and Fury", a song from the 2013 Skillet album Rise
- Fire and Fury, the fourth novel in The Chronicles of Avantia book series
- Fire and Fury: the Allied Bombing of Germany 1942–1945, a 2008 book by Randall Hansen
- Fire and Fury Records, a record label founded by Bobby Robinson
- Fire and Fury Corps, also known as the XIV Corps, a division of the Indian Army
