= Commodore User =

British video game magazine

- November 1988 issue
- Editor: Dennis Jarrett (Oct 83–Aug 84); Bohdan Buciak (Sep 84–Nov 84); Eugene Lacey (Dec 84–Jan 88); Mike Pattenden (Jan 88–Feb 90)
- Categories: Computer magazine
- Frequency: Monthly
- Circulation: 72,892 (July – Dec 1988)
- First issue: October 1983
- Final issue Number: February 1990; 77
- Company: Paradox, EMAP
- Country: United Kingdom
- Language: English
- ISSN: 0265-721X

Commodore User (also referred to as CU), later renamed to CU Amiga, is a British magazine initially published by Paradox Group before being acquired by EMAP.

== Timeline ==
Commodore User was launched in October 1983 with an initial preview issue in June 1983. Initially, the magazine contained information about in-depth computer information of its time, such as programming tutorials, machine code features, and business software reviews. The first issues were produced and written by editor Dennis Jarrett, writer and future editor Bohdan Buciak, and editorial assistant Nicky Chapman. Features were written by a range of contributors, and the issue sizes grew rapidly from 64 to 96 pages.

The first 12 issues of Commodore User were published by Paradox Group until September 1984; thereafter, publishing was handled by EMAP until the final issue in February 1990. Game coverage began to appear by the second issue. This consisted of a small section called Screen Scene from issue three. In 1985, the Commodore 64 became more popular. The amount of technical coverage decreased as gaming coverage increased. The circulation began to rise, and CU produced more color through the magazine. At the height of the C64's success, CU had a page count of 116.

In 1986, CU began to cover the new 16-bit computer: the Amiga. The magazine covered all the Commodore platforms, from the C16 to the Amiga. Circulation figures also showed an all-time high of over 70,000 for the 1988 period.

To establish that the magazine content was changing to include the Amiga platform, the magazine changed its title to "CU Commodore User Amiga-64" in the February 1989 issue. The Commodore User part was dropped quickly, and the name became CU Amiga-64. This period of the magazine was a transitional time between transferring coverage from C64 to the Amiga.

== CU Amiga ==
CU Amiga Magazine
- Editor: Steve James (Mar 90–Mar 92); Dan Slingsby (Apr 92–Feb 94); Alan Dykes (Apr 94–Nov 96); Tony Horgan (Dec 96–Oct 98)
- Categories: Computer and video games magazine
- Frequency: Monthly
- First issue: March 1990
- Final issue Number: October 1998; 104
- Company: EMAP
- Country: United Kingdom
- Website: http://www.cu-amiga.co.uk/
- ISSN: 0963-0090

In 1990, CU Amiga-64 removed the "64" from its name and relaunched it as CU Amiga with the March 1990 issue. The magazine gained circulation as a result of the internationalization.

In late 1994, the Amiga's popularity was declining. In its remaining years under the control of editor Tony Horgan, the magazine became highly technical. Some staff from sister magazine The One were moved to CU when the former closed in July 1995 and provided games coverage for CU readers. "THE ONE AMIGA you have known and loved is not dead, but It has changed somewhat. The previous writers and publishers have moved on to better things, and the magazine now lies in entirely new hands, at Maverick Magazines. So we'll take to opportunity to welcome all the original readers of The One to the new Maverick Edition, and to point out to them the new address."

The final issue was released in October 1998. CU Amiga Magazine's closure meant that the only remaining monthly Amiga newsstand magazine was its closest rival, Amiga Format.

A year after CU's closure in October 1999, the magazine Amiga Active was launched. It had several of the same staff and was competition for Amiga Format, which it ultimately outlived, by being published until November 2001.

Time Extension praised the magazine: "[...] they had some of the best screenshots, writing and layout in the business." and "[...] CU Amiga was the gold standard for UK computer game coverage circa 1990 [...]".
