= Seaquest =

seaQuest DSV is an American science fiction television series.

seaQuest, SeaQuest, Sea Quest, or Seaquest may also refer to:

- SeaQuest (aquariums), a U.S. chain of retail-mall-based aquaria.
- seaQuest DSV (video game), a 1994/1995 game based on the TV series
- Sea Quest (drilling rig), a semi-submersible oil platform
- Fermilab E-906/SeaQuest, a fixed target experiment at the Fermi National Accelerator Laboratory
- Seaquest (video game), an unrelated Atari 2600 game released in 1982
- Seaquest State Park, a state park located in the northwest US state of Washington
- SeaQuest, a brand of diving equipment affiliated with Aqua Lung International
- Sea Quest (novel series), a series of fantasy novels for children
