= Richard Jackson Books =

Richard Jackson Books was an imprint at:

- Orchard Books (1986-1996)
- DK Ink (1996-1999)
- Atheneum Books for Young Readers (1999-2019)
