= American Peoples Encyclopedia =

Discontinued encyclopedia published 1948–1976

The American Peoples Encyclopedia
- Title page for The American Peoples Encyclopedia (1948)
- Language: English
- Published: 1948
- Publisher: Spencer Press Inc.
- Publication place: United States

The American Peoples Encyclopedia is a discontinued general encyclopedia first published in 1948 by Spencer Press Inc., and, initially, marketed exclusively by Sears Roebuck and Company. A substantially revised edition, lauded for its concise, accurate articles, was published by Grolier Incorporated in 1962 and marketed by a Grolier subsidiary, The Richards Company, Inc.

== History ==
The 1948 edition of the American Peoples Encyclopedia was a 20-volume work, with more 10,000,000 words, written by 3,200 contributors, including 9 Nobel Prize winners. It covered 50,000 topics and included 15,000 illustrations, 500 in color, and a 160-page atlas in full color.

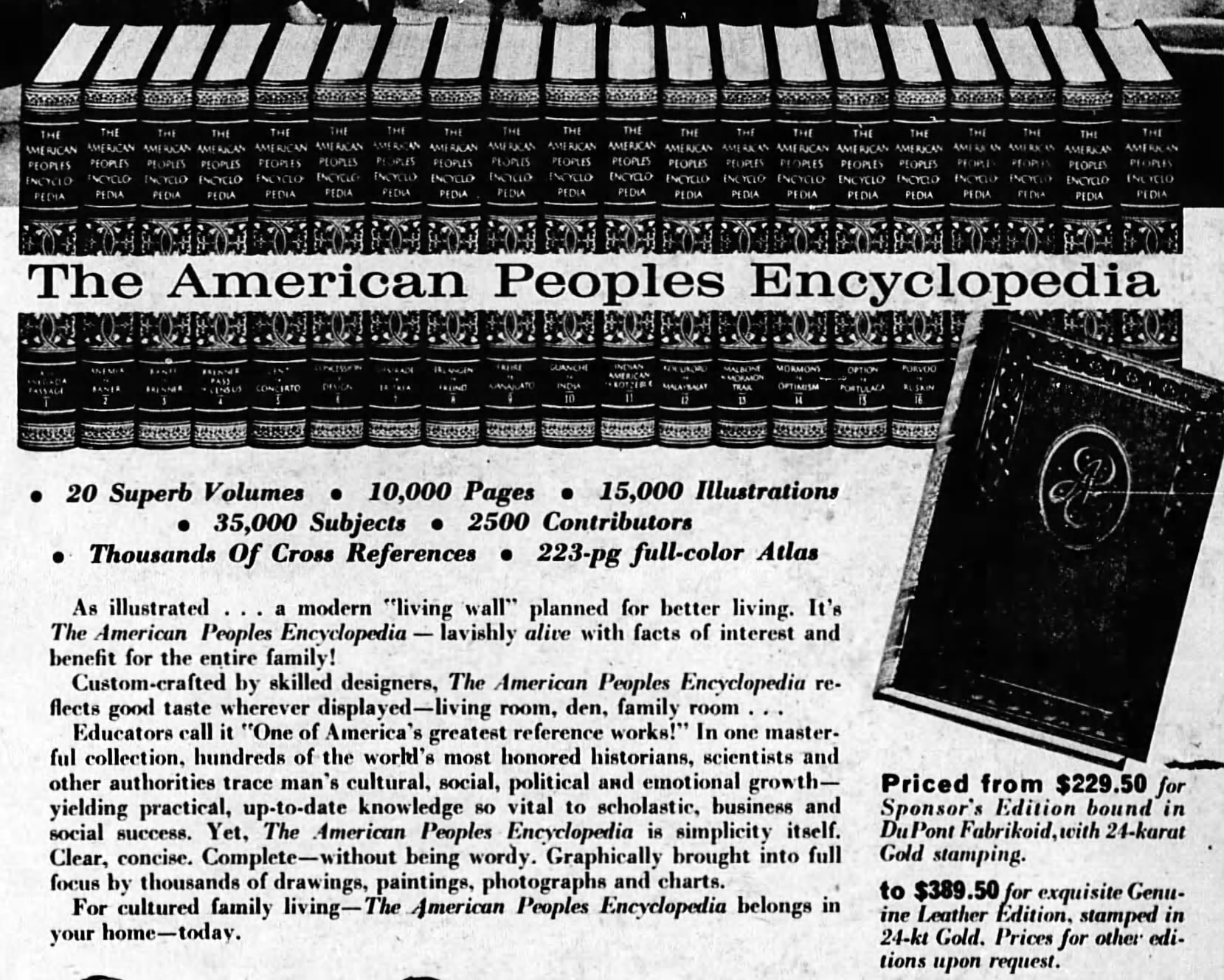
1961 Ad for the American Peoples Encyclopedia

The Chairman of the American Peoples Encyclopedia Editorial Board was Walter Dill Scott, President Emeritus of Northwestern University. The Editor-in-Chief was Franklin J. Meine. Sears Roebuck and Company conducted a national advertising campaign that supported both its retail store and its mail-order catalog encyclopedia sales. The company's group manager for American Peoples Encyclopedia sales was A.T. Cashman.

In 1961, Grolier, the largest publisher of encyclopedias in the United States, purchased Spencer Press Inc. and the American Peoples Encyclopedia. The encyclopedia was substantially revised by Grolier's encyclopedia editor, Lowell A. Martin, and a new edition was published in 1962. The 20 volume 1962 edition was designed for use by adults and older students, and featured 35,000 articles, and 13,000 illustrations.

A Grolier subsidiary, The Richards Company, Inc., marketed the newly revised encyclopedia. Under The Richards Company's president, John G. Ryan, sales of American Peoples Encyclopedia soared, and by 1968, its sales volume exceeded that of Grolier's Encyclopedia Americana division.

However, by the early 1970s, Grolier's editors gave higher priority to updating Encyclopedia Americana and other publications. American Peoples Encyclopedia received only modest yearly revisions. Then, in 1973, Ryan converted The Richards Company's worldwide sales executives into independent distributors and began marketing a wider variety of Grolier's reference books, including Encyclopedia International and New Book of Knowledge.

In 1976, with The Richards Company no longer selling American Peoples Encyclopedia, Grolier discontinued it, deciding not to underwrite the expense necessary for a needed updating.

== Assessment ==
A well-known analysis of major encyclopedias by Kenneth Kister included his perspectives on the American Peoples Encyclopedia. Kister noted its strengths, including concise, accurate articles. Articles on people and places accounted for a majority of the encyclopedia's entries. But Kister also found that the American Peoples Encyclopedia had dull illustrations, sparse bibliographies, a bland writing style, and superficial coverage of many topics. Kister concluded that the American Peoples Encyclopedia was a competent but not a distinguished work.
