= Golden Gate Killer =

1995 video game

- Cover art
- Developer: Interworks
- Publisher: Grolier Electronic Publishing Inc
- Director: Julie Marsh
- Designer: Paul Drexler
- Composer: Russell Lieblich
- Platforms: Windows 95, Windows 3.1, Mac OS
- Release: 1995
- Genres: First-person true-crime murder mystery video game, Adventure
- Mode: Single-player

Golden Gate Killer (marketed under SFPD Case File: The Body in the Bay in the UK and SFPD Homicide in the US) is an interactive police detective simulation developed by American studio Interworks and released in 1995, and published by Grolier Electronic Publishing Inc and 3 Prong Plus. The game is based on the real life murder case of Colvin McCright. The game was released for Macintosh, Windows 95, and Windows 3.1.

== Development ==
The game was developed by Julie Marsh and Paul Drexler, who consulted with Detective Falzon to receive fictionalized details on a real crime. Interworks began in 1991 out of Marsh and Drexler's cottage home and in March 1995 they relocated to an artists' warehouse. They filmed the game at 20 locations throughout San Francisco.

The game design incorporated both full motion video and photo graphics, while a narrative was crafted that saw the player takes up the role of a San Francisco Police Department detective tasked with clearing up a series of murders. Interworks states in their online company profile that the software is used to train detectives and insurance investigators.

The Body in the Bay was intended to the first title in a series called SFPD Homicide.

== Gameplay and plot ==
Marketed as a first-person true-crime murder mystery video game, the player takes the role of San Francisco's newest homicide detective who has teamed up with a real investigator for a partner and guide. A 50-something white male is found floating in the bay near Pier 91, bound and gagged.

Using evidence, clues and procedures from the actual case, the player must explore the victim's life, vices and secret passions. Along the way, the player can interact with more than 40 characters from the victim's life as the case takes the detective from the city's posh nightclubs to its deserted piers. The player's tasks encompass examining crime scenes and securing evidence as well as interrogating witnesses and suspects to uncover the identity of the serial killer.

It is notable that, like many other FMV games of the era, Golden Gate Killer uses Apple's QuickTime technology for its integration of movies and sound, and also comes on a hybrid Windows/Macintosh CD-ROM (i.e. a single disc containing both the Mac and Windows versions of the game).

SFPD Homicide uses an interface that allows the player to cross-reference clues from crime scenes, witness statements, as well as test results. The game requires interviewing, research, inductive and deductive reasoning, thoroughness, and following a set of steps with defined parameters.

== Critical reception ==
Reception

Review scores
Publication	Score
Next Generation	4/5
PC Joker	60%
PC Player	4/5
Generation 4	3/5

Awards
Publication	Award
Milia D'Or awards	Named "Prize of the Professionals" for 1996
New Media	American Bookseller's Spring Booksellers' Choice 1996

Next Generation reviewed the PC version of the game, rating it four stars out of five, and stated that "Finding a suspect, building a case, and then collaborating with the D.A. to make the case is a hearty request in the time allotted and is likely to have you reworking the case a few times before justice is served." PC Joker gave the game a rating of 60% while PC Player offered 4 stars and Generation 4 gave it 3 stars. Coming Soon Magazine said it was exciting, well done and mind-challenging. PC Me recommended the game for the "intellectually inclined".

The game won the popular vote award Prize of the Professionals at the Intermedia World 96 award ceremony.

== See also ==
- Golden State Killer, a serial killer and rapist
