= John G. Ryan =

American publisher (1910–1989)

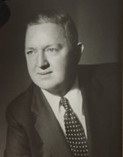
John G. Ryan in 1956

John Gerard Ryan (1910–1989) was an American publisher, president of P.F. Collier & Son Corporation and of The Richards Company, Inc., a subsidiary of Grolier Incorporated. He was pivotal to the 1950s and 1960s expansion of the American encyclopedia business that placed reference libraries in millions of homes. He published and marketed Collier's Encyclopedia, The Harvard Classics, the New Book of Knowledge, the American Peoples Encyclopedia, and other reference works. Ryan helped middle and low income families afford in-home libraries by permitting customers to pay over time with small monthly payments.

Ryan's profitable leadership of P.F. Collier & Son supplied the cash flow that kept its parent company, The Crowell-Collier Publishing Company (later renamed Macmillan, Inc), solvent in the 1950s as it closed its money-losing magazines, including Collier's, and grew into one of the world's largest book publishers. At P.F. Collier & Son, he employed the conservative intellectual William Terry Couch as editor of Collier’s Encyclopedia and instructed Couch to begin compilation of what became Collier’s Encyclopedia’s 24-volume 1962 edition. At Grolier, publishers of Encyclopedia Americana, he built The Richards Company, Inc., into Grolier's highest sales volume book division. Ryan also pioneered the sale of American encyclopedias in overseas markets.

== Personal life ==
John Gerard Ryan was born July 11, 1910, in South Boston, Massachusetts. He was the eldest son of Michael Ryan of Gortnacrusha, Ballinspittle, County Cork, Ireland and Julia McCarthy Ryan of Grange More, Timoleague, also in County Cork. He was educated in Boston’s public schools. In 1937, he married Veronica Conlon, of Brooklyn, New York. They had six children. A former resident of Teaneck, New Jersey, Ryan died in 1989 at his home in Tenafly, New Jersey.
