= Xenocracy =

1998 video game

- Developer(s): Simis
- Publisher(s): Grolier Interactive
- Platform(s): Windows, PlayStation
- Release: 1998
- Genre(s): Space combat simulator, strategy
- Mode(s): Single-player, Multiplayer

Xenocracy is a space simulator developed by Simis and published by Grolier Interactive in 1998. Xenocracy is a cross between a space combat action sim and a political strategy game.

== Story ==
The year is 10 600 of the Common Era. Mankind has colonised space, founding a Solar dominion on the power and wealth created by the mineral lycosite. Four great planetary superpowers - Earth, Mars, Venus and Mercury - wage a covert war for the outer colonies and their rich reserves of lycosite. Only the peacekeepers of the United Planet Nations can prevent these skirmishes and raids from erupting into all-out Solar War. You are the WingToucher commanding the elite U.P.N.

== Gameplay ==
In the far future, four planetary superpowers (the Earth Dominion, the Mercury League, the Venus Alliance and the Mars Combine) are vying for control of the Solar System and on the brink of all-out "thermostellar war". As commander of the United Planet Nations peacekeeping fighter squadron, the player's role is to maintain the balance and prevent cold war and localized conflicts from escalating into open interplanetary hostilities. The player also must deal with pirates and a looming alien threat.

As each planetary superpower launches low-intensity strikes (as opposed to open warfare) against the colonies and outposts of the other three, the player is presented with the choice, via a solar system map showing flaring geopolitical hotspots, of which to aid. If the player aids one superpower too much at the expense of the others, the power balance is upset and causes the war the player sought to prevent. After making a choice, the player is presented with complaints and political propaganda from the other three superpowers, and receives news broadcasts concerning the interplanetary geopolitical wrangling.

In addition to keeping the peace, the player manages research and development of newer and more powerful technologies, which will eventually prove crucial. Several fighter and weapon types are available, and the scenery varies from asteroid belts and dust clouds to planetary surfaces. The player may choose from several wingmen, each with a personal description and personality type, whom the player must try to keep alive. Missions include such tasks as defending mine complexes from attack (or attacking them) and protecting convoys (or destroying them).

== Multiplayer ==
The game allows multiplayer up to 8 players over TCP/IP or serial connections.
