= The 1995 Guinness Multimedia Disc of Records =

- Developer: Grolier Electronic Publishing
- Release: 1995
- Operating system: Windows; Macintosh

The 1995 Guinness Multimedia Disc of Records is a software CD-ROM from Grolier Electronic Publishing.

== Summary ==
The 1995 Guinness Multimedia Disc of Records consists of 15,000 records documented. It also contains more than 1000 images in addition to videos and Interviews.

== Reception ==
The Oregonian recommended The 1995 Guinness Multimedia Disc of Records to fans of Guiness. The Indianapolis Star gave The 1995 Guinness Multimedia Disc of Records a score of 2 out of 4. Computer Shopper called The 1995 Guinness Multimedia Disc of Records better at presenting entertaining facts than innovative multimedia. MacHome Journal gave Guinness Multimedia Disc of Records a score of 3 out of 5.
