= William Terry Couch =

William Terry Couch (1901–1988) was a U.S. intellectual and academic editor, known primarily for his work as director of the University of Chicago Press in the 1940s, and his work as Editor in Chief of Collier's Encyclopedia in the 1950s. He also wrote and commented extensively on encyclopedias, their organization and role in modern society and academia. Friends, family and colleagues knew him as Bill Couch.

== Biography ==
Couch was born in Pamplin City, Virginia in 1901. He was raised in Virginia and North Carolina. His family settled in Chapel Hill, North Carolina before 1920. He attended the University of North Carolina and after brief military service immediately following World War I, returned to Chapel Hill to work for the University of North Carolina Press where he rose to be the director of the press and therefore a member of the university faculty. His brother, John Couch was also a member of the University of North Carolina Biology Department faculty. In 1945, Couch was hired as Director and General Editor of the University of Chicago Press. In 1949, he was dismissed from that position by University of Chicago Chancellor Robert Maynard Hutchins after a significant public academic controversy over the publication of Morton Grodzins' book Americans Betrayed. Couch had published the book after refusing Hutchins' request to suppress the manuscript.

In September 1952, P. F. Collier and Son Corporation hired Couch as Editor-in-Chief of its 20-volume Collier's Encyclopedia, and of Collier's annual Year Book. Couch assumed his new job at a time of unprecedented consumer demand for encyclopedias. Under P. F. Collier President John G. Ryan, Collier's sales rose from $9 million in 1953 to $23 million in 1956 and over $25 million in 1957. As Editor-in-Chief, Couch sought to present multiple and varying perspectives on controversial issues addressed in the encyclopedia and in the annual Year Book. He quickly came under criticism from left-wing academics and librarians for soliciting article contributions from conservative and anti-communist writers. In Collier's widely acclaimed Year Book for 1957, covering the dramatic events of 1956, Couch edited articles from three hundred contributors, while addressing explosive topics, such as the Suez Crisis, and the anti-Communist Hungarian Revolution of 1956.

Ryan generally supported Couch's editorial policies and directed him to compile an expanded revision of Collier’s Encyclopedia by 1962. However, in 1957, outside investors seized full control of Crowell-Collier Publishing Company, P. F. Collier's parent company, and storm clouds began to gather for Couch. Already under a U.S. Securities and Exchange Commission investigation for an unregistered bond sale, Crowell Collier's new management also held insider stock options and would profit personally from manipulating an increase in Crowell Collier's stock price. Crowell Collier's new directors, paper bag company executives with no publishing experience, pressured Ryan to loosen encyclopedia sales practices, lower customer credit standards, and cut Couch's editorial budget. Ryan resisted, and despite generating record profits, was fired in April 1959.

With his friend and ally gone, Couch's days at P. F. Collier were numbered. Couch rebuffed a proposal by Crowell Collier's chairman that the expanded revision of Collier’s Encyclopedia include one volume of equal page length for each letter of the alphabet. Unwilling to compromise his editorial standards, Couch was fired, following Ryan out the door in July 1959.

In September 1959, after considering starting a new business with John Ryan, Couch joined publisher J. J. Little & Ives as Editorial Vice President. He left that position in 1966 and retired to North Carolina.

Couch married Elizabeth Calvert circa 1925 and had two children, Elizabeth and Jane. He died in 1988 in Charlottesville, Virginia after a prolonged illness.
