= The 1996 Grolier Multimedia Encyclopedia =

- Developer: Grolier Electronic Publishing
- Release: September 1995
- Operating system: Windows; Macintosh

The 1996 Grolier Multimedia Encyclopedia is a software CD-ROM from Grolier Electronic Publishing.

== Summary ==
The 1996 Grolier Multimedia Encyclopedia contains 1,200 new articles in addition to new 3-D models, interactive animations and layered diagrams called Reveal Art.

== Development ==
The Macintosh version of The 1996 Grolier Multimedia Encyclopedia was released in November 1995. It integrates CompuServe and CompuServe's popular Internet browser, is included on the Grolier Windows disc.

== Reception ==
CNET liked the new interface in The 1996 Grolier Multimedia Encyclopedia as well the addition of new maps, music, and other features. Computer Shopper called The 1996 Grolier Multimedia Encyclopedia not as flashy as its competitors Compton's Interactive and Microsoft Encarta but found the new interface attractive and simple to use.
