= Talisman (book series) =

Novel series by Allan Frewin Jones

Talisman is a series of four children's books written by Allan Frewin Jones and published in 2005. The main characters are Olivia (Olly) Christie and Josh Welles who live with Olly's father and Josh's brother, who are archæologists, and the plot concerns the hunt for the 'talismans of the moon'.

Although there are only four books currently in the series, there are more than four of the 'Talismans of the Moon'.

== The Tears of Isis ==
The cover of 'The Tears of Isis'

Olly and Josh are in Egypt, searching for the 'tears of Isis', the first of the talismans of the moon. The tears of Isis are sapphires, hidden away in an ancient Egyptian pyramid. But is someone else on the tears trail? Who will reach them first?
202 pages

== The Mooncake of Chang-O ==
The cover of 'The Mooncake of Chang-o'

This time, Olly and Josh are in China, on the hunt for the second talisman of the moon, the 'mooncake of Chang-O. They are there at the right time too-it's Chinese New Year! But will the celebrations help or deter the friends on their mission?
201 pages

== The Amulet of Quilla ==
The cover of 'The Amulet of Quilla'

Olly and Josh are looking for their third talisman of the moon, the 'Amulet of Quilla', in South American ruins. Signs appear all around them, but which do they follow?
200 pages

== The Elephant of Parvati ==
The cover of 'The Elephant of Parvati'

Olly and Josh are on the trail of another talisman of the moon-the 'Elephant of Parvati', in India. However, someone else seems to always be one step ahead of them on their quest...
202 pages
