= The Faerie Path =

2007 fantasy novel by Frewin Jones

- Author: Frewin Jones
- Language: English
- Genre: Young adult Fantasy
- Publisher: Eos/HarperCollins
- Publication date: February 6, 2007
- Publication place: United Kingdom
- Media type: Print (hardcover and paperback)
- Pages: 320
- ISBN: 978-0-06-087102-4
- OCLC: 70659892
- LC Class: PZ7.J71 Fae 2007
- Followed by: The Lost Queen

The Faerie Path is the first novel in a six-book series by the British author Frewin Jones. The story follows Anita Palmer, a teenager from two different parallel universes, and her struggle to maintain both lives.

== Plot ==
On the eve of her sixteenth birthday, Anita has an accident and ends up in hospital with her boyfriend Evan. To brighten her mood, at midnight her parents give her one of her presents, one sent to her by mail with no return address: it is a beautiful book, but the pages are blank.

Anita explores the book, which suddenly has a story written inside. It tells about a lost princess, the seventh of seven daughters, who has become trapped in the Mortal World on her sixteenth birthday, the night before she was to marry Lord Gabriel Drake. Suddenly Anita grows wings and she flies out of the window, above London. Suddenly, her wings wither away and she falls. Found in the hospital bathroom by a nurse, she is returned to her bed, still worried about Evan not waking. The nurse brings Anita a gift addressed to her, from Evan's belongings. The gift is a necklace that she quickly puts around her neck. She fell asleep, and when she woke up, Evan is gone. A ghostly image appears to Anita, the image of Gabriel Drake, calling her to follow him. Anita followed Lord Drake out onto a balcony where he urges her to focus strongly on him so that she can reach him. Anita tries her hardest to focus on him and suddenly their hands meet in the air. Lord Drake pulls Anita from the Mortal realm presents her to her father: as it turns out, Anita is also Tania, the seventh child of Oberon and Titania, king and queen of fairyland.

== Reception ==
The Faerie Path was viewed as a "floral Faerie tale may unspool at a measured pace, but girls will likely take to Anita. ... A well-executed reference to Romeo and Juliet gives the finale a bit more punch than most fantasy romances" and a "well-paced style that will communicate with today’s readers." It was rated as a book with good Christian values by Squeaky Clean Reviews who also found the "revelation of the villains horribly predictable." It was recommended for readers who enjoy romance and adventure.
