= Banzai Bug =

1996 video game

- Developer: Gravity
- Publisher: Grolier Interactive
- Platform: Windows
- Release: NA: December 2, 1996
- Genre: Action

Banzai Bug is a 1996 video game developed by American studio Gravity and published by Grolier for Microsoft Windows 95. It was marketed as "The Flight-Sim with an Attitude". The player controls Banzai Bug, to escape the house of an exterminator while avoiding deadly obstacles and collecting items for his eventual escape.

== Gameplay ==
Banzai Bug is a game in which the player controls Banzai Bug, to escape a house that an exterminator has trapped him in. The story, narrated by an older Banzai "as a grandfather's war story", involves Banzai, while vacationing from the countryside, surfing the wind in front of a moving car until he hits the car's grille, which eventually stops in the exterminator's garage. Banzai needs to fly underneath furniture and travel through air ducts while avoiding people, shooting robot bugs, and looking for food. Other threats are guns named Static Spitters, flying robots named Attack Spitters, machines named Zappers that shoot lightning bolts, and Biggies who are humans that can only be driven away. The house is reminiscent of a mixture between The Jetsons and Pablo Picasso paintings. The game includes the sound of "metallic dings and dizzying twitters" whenever Banzai crashes.

Characters that Banzai meets during his quest to escape include a small insect named Poolio who has a Cheech Marin accent and uses one-liners. The video game has 360-degree 3-D views and movement that was made using DirectX. The game has seven levels with the first one taking place in the garage and allowing the player to learn how to properly fly. A joystick with three buttons is an option to control Banzai. There are three flying modes which are the look-around, helicopter for collecting items, and plane as a normal flight system. The player can choose between a plain appearance and one that is more complex. The size of the screen can be changed along with the colors, music, and other details. Banzai has to search for items which will allow him to build an anti-human weapon named a Stinkulator so that he can escape. Each mission includes animated scenes.

Banzai Bug was created as "The Flight-Sim with an Attitude". It was published by Grolier for Microsoft Windows 95. The game requires a microprocessor of Pentium 90 or newer on Windows 95 with 8 megabytes of RAM. The music was recorded by New Dog Music. Paul Goodwin of New Dog Music said that they "recorded a full 11-piece big band doing eight original songs."

== Reception ==
Reception

Review scores
Publication	Score
Computer Gaming World	3.5/5
Génération 4	3/5
Joystick	80/100
Next Generation	3/5
PC Games (DE)	29%
PC Zone	63/100
PCMag	
The Cincinnati Enquirer	3.5/4
PC Player	4/5
PC Review	5/10
Power Play	64%

Next Generation reviewed the game, rating it three stars out of five, and stated that "Banzai Bug is a cute game that is deceptively deep. While it has clearly been aimed and marketed toward a younger audience, many missions are very reminiscent of X-Wing." PCMag wrote that the game has "very cool 3-D graphics" that "adds a solid visual punch to a very enjoyable game." Billboard stated that the game is "an innovative and fun title." Scott A. May of Computer Gaming World said, "Despite the funky controls and slightly repetitive gameplay, Banzai Bug has enough originality and offbeat style to be declared a winner."

Andy Grieser of Fort Worth Star-Telegram said, "This ultra-cartoon setting is fine for younger players, but older pilots will long for the smooth polygon textures of other games." Brian Pipa, writing for The Adrenaline Vault, concluded his review with "All things considered, the game falls short. The whole wise-cracking bug theme, harassing the Biggies, and making a Stinkulator is just too "cutesy" for the average gamer and seems to be geared more toward the younger gamer, but the difficulty of the missions is too much for a younger player." Craig Majaski of World Village said, "Banzai Bug proves that just because a game is semi-original (basically this game is your basic shooter disguised as a kids title) doesn't mean it's any fun." Charlie Brooker said in a PC Zone review that the game "can't fool the kids, who'll merely raise an eyebrow and then return to the gib-heavy action of Quake and company."
