= Wyatt Earp's Old West =

1994 video game

- Developer(s): Grolier Electronic Publishing
- Publisher(s): Grolier Electronic Publishing
- Platform(s): Windows, Macintosh
- Release: 1994

Wyatt Earp's Old West is a computer game developed by Grolier Electronic Publishing in 1994 for Windows 3.x and Macintosh.

== Plot ==
Wyatt Earp's Old West is an educational game within a multimedia encyclopedia. The package includes a "Shootout" game which is a stand-up arcade shooter. The majority of the program involves exploring an Old West town, while the narrator talks about life in that era. When the player leaves a building, the narrator asks a question related to the room, with the player earning money for correct responses.

== Reception ==
The game was reviewed in 1995 in Dragon #215 by Jay & Dee in the "Eye of the Monitor" column. Both reviewers gave the game 2½ out of 5 stars.
