= George Edwin Rines =

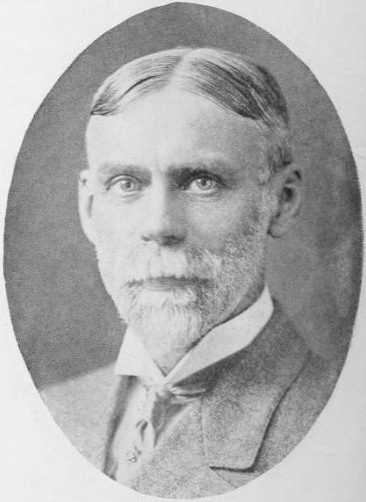
- Born: December 28, 1860; Maitland, Nova Scotia, British North America
- Died: November 30, 1951 (aged 90); New York City, US
- Education: Colgate University; Hamilton Theological Seminary
- Occupation: Editor

Signature
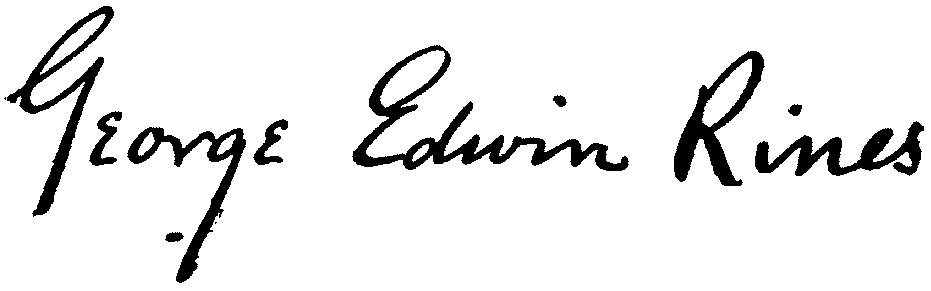

George Edwin Rines (December 28, 1860 (Note: According to his obituary in The Evening Star, "Reference books listed his birth at Maitland, Nova Scotia, at different dates between 1851 and 1860.") – November 30, 1951) was a British North America-born editor who grew up and worked in the United States.

== Biography ==
George Edwin Rines was born in Maitland, Nova Scotia on December 28, 1860. Coming to the United States when 11 years old, his early education was obtained in the public schools of Brooklyn, New York. For several years after graduation from the high school there he was engaged in mercantile life, but in 1887 resumed his studies at Colgate University in Hamilton, New York. In 1890, he entered the full Hebrew and Greek course in theology and was graduated from the Hamilton Theological Seminary in 1893.

He was for two years pastor at Binghamton, New York, afterward accepting a call to the pastorate of the First Baptist Church of Ridgewood, New Jersey, where he remained for three years. He resigned from the ministry in 1899 to devote himself to literary work, and has been a frequent contributor to religious and other periodicals. In 1903, he was appointed managing editor of the Encyclopedia Americana, to which he contributed many articles. Subsequently Rines was managing editor of the United Editors Encyclopedia, and in 1910-11 was general editor of The Foundation Library for Young People. From 1913 to 1915, Rines was managing editor of The German Classics, and after 1916 was editor-in-chief of the second edition of Encyclopedia Americana.

Rines was found dead in his hotel room in New York City on November 30, 1951.
