= Allan Frewin Jones =

English writer

- Born: 30 April 1954 (age 72); London, England
- Occupation: Writer
- Writing career
- Genres: Children's and young adult fantasy
- Notable works: The Faerie Path series; Talisman series
- Website: allanfrewinjones.com

Allan Frewin Jones (born 30 April 1954) is an English writer credited with more than 90 books for children and young adults. He has published under the alternate names: Fiona Kelly, A F Jones, Frewin Jones, Damien Graves, Adam Blade, Nick Shadow, and Allan Jones.

== Biography ==
=== Early years ===
Born in London, United Kingdom, Jones began writing at age nine. He grew up with his mother, father, and one older sister, and enjoyed art, music, reading, and writing from an early age. Jones worked various clerical and civil service jobs until obtaining a Fine Art Diploma of Higher Education from.

=== Writing career ===
Jones' first book, The Mole and Beverley Miller, was published by Hodder Books in 1987. Since then, he has published children's and young adult books and stories in multiple genres, including fantasy, romance, and speculative fiction.

Jones is a prolific author of novel series for young people. He was commissioned to write the first book of The Mystery Club series (published as written by non-existent author Fiona Kelly), after which he was given his own series, including The Hunter and Moon books, Dark Paths, the Little Sister books (as A F Jones), Talisman, Special Agents (under the pen name Sam Hutton), and the six volume fantasy series The Faerie Path and Warrior Princess (both as Frewin Jones). One of the Talisman books, The Tears of Isis, was shortlisted for the 2006 Stockton Children's Book of the Year literary prize.

In 2008, Jones met with the illustrator Gary Chalk and they produced a series for Hodder Children's Books, published in the UK as Sundered Lands and in America as The Six Crowns. This series was praised by the American Library Association's Booklist and well-reviewed in School Library Journal, Kirkus, and Bulletin of the Center for Children's Books, among other places. Following The Six Crowns, Jones was offered a six-volume spy-boy series by Orion, published as Codename Quicksilver, while continuing to do ‘writer-for-hire’ work and continuing to collaborate with Gary Chalk on new series ideas.

Jones is represented by Pam van Hylckama Vlieg of Foreword Literary, a hybrid literary agency based in California.

=== Personal life ===
Allan Frewin Jones lives in Cornwall with his wife and a cat called Tallulah Bankhead.

== Works ==
=== Novels ===
- The Mole & Beverley Miller (1987)
- The Cost of Going Free (1988)
- Dark Secrets Red Ink (as Steven Saunders) (1988)
- Rabbit Back And Doubled (1989)
- Kisschase (as Steven Saunders) (1989)
- Blind Ally (as Steven Saunders) (1989)
- Millions of Lisa (1990)
- Bad Penny (1990)
- The Half-Good Samaritan (1991)
- Tommy And The Sloth (1992)
- Burning Issues (1994)
- The Great Sister War (1995)
- Sneaking Out (1995)
- My Sister, My Slave (1995)
- Sister Switch (1995)
- Stacy the Matchmaker (1995)
- New Stacy (1996)
- Writing for Children and Getting Published (1997)
- Alien Fire File (1997)
- Skull Stone File (1997)
- The Weird Eyes File (1997)
- Annas Birthday Adventure (1997)
- The Feathered Tree (2026)

=== Poetry ===
- I've Got A Valentine (in the anthology Our Side of the Playground) (1991)

=== Short stories ===
- Confessions of a Bad Bear (in the anthology Teddy Bear Stories for Grown Ups) (1993)
- Karla (in the anthology Fantastic Space Stories) (1994)
- Dear Mum, Please Don’t Panic (in the anthology Dear Mum, Don’t Panic) (1995)
- The Cannibal Fiend of Rotherhithe (in the Steampunk anthology Corsets & Clockwork) (2011)

=== Story books ===
- Wishing Bird & Co. (illustrated by Larry Wilkes) (1993)
- Anna’s Birthday Adventure (illustrated by Judy Brown) (1997)

=== Picture book ===
- Meerkat in Trouble (illustrated by Adrienne Kennaway) (1997)

=== Non-fiction ===
- Teach Yourself Writing For Children (with Lesley Pollinger) (4 revised editions, most recent 2010)

=== Series ===
- The Hunter & Moon Mysteries (1997–1998)

The Weird Eyes File, The Alien Fire File, The Skull Stone File, the Time Traveler File, The Thunderbolt File, The Star Ship File.

- Dark Paths (1998–1999)

The Wicker Man, The Plague Pit, Unquiet Graves, the Phantom Pilot, The Wreckers, Blood Stone, The Monk's Curse, Ghostlight.

- Dark Paths – Heinemann ELT Guided Readers (2000)

The Phantom Airman, Unquiet Graves.

- Sundered Lands (UK)/The Six Crowns (USA) (co-created and illustrated by Gary Chalk) (2010–1011)

Trundle's Quest, Fair Wind to Widdershins, Fire Over Swallowhaven, The Ice Gate of Spyre, Sargasso Skies, Full Circle.

- Codename Quicksilver (as Allan Jones) (2012–2013)
- Beast Quest (as Adam Blade) (2008–2019)

In the Zone, The Tyrant King, Burning Sky, Killchase, Adrenaline Rush, End Game.

=== Working Partners series ===
The Mystery Club (as Fiona Kelly) (1993–1995)

- Secret Clues
- Dangerous Tricks
- Hide & Seek
- Secret Treasure
- Crossed Lines
- Crash Landing
- Poison!
- Out Of Control
- The Secret Room

The Mystery Kids (as Fiona Kelly) (1995–1996)

- Spy-catchers
- The Empty House
- Blackmail!
- Hostage!

Little Sister/Stacy & Co. (1995–1999)

- The Great Sister War
- Pippa's Problem Page
- My Sister My Slave
- My Real Best Friend
- Stacy The Matchmaker
- The New Guy
- Copycat
- Party Time
- Sneaking Out
- Scary Sleepover
- Sister Switch
- Summer Camp
- Star Search
- Fern Flips
- Full House
- You Look Great!
- Bad Boy
- The New Stacy!
- Pippa On Air
- Dream Sister

Internet Detectives (as Michael Coleman) (1997)

- Virus Attack
- Access Denied

Special Agents (as Sam Hutton) (2003–2005)

- Deep End
- Final Shot
- Countdown
- Kiss & Kill
- Full Throttle
- Meltdown

Talisman (2005)

- The Tears of Isis
- The Mooncake of Chang-O
- The Amulet of Quilla
- The Elephant of Parvati

The Faerie Path (as Frewin Jones) (2007–2011)

- The Faerie Path
- The Lost Queen
- The Sorcerer King/The Seventh Daughter
- The Immortal Realm
- The Enchanted Quest
- The Charmed Return

Warrior Princess (as Frewin Jones) (Published in the UK as Destiny’s Path and as Allan Frewin Jones) (2009–2012)

- Warrior Princess/Rhiannon of the Spring
- Destiny's Path/Govannon of the Wood
- The Emerald Flame/Merion of the Stones
- The Bright Blade/Caradoc of the North Wind
