= Kenneth Kister =

American academic and librarian (1935–2022)

Kenneth F. Kister (November 3, 1935 – September 21, 2022) was an academic, professor of library science and authority in the field of reference and information sources.

== Career ==
As an academic Kister taught in the 1960s on "Intellectual Freedom and Censorship". As an author, he edited Kister's Best Encyclopedias and Kister's Best Dictionaries, and wrote on the history of librarianship.

He was also the biographer of influential librarian and Library Journal editor, Eric Moon.

== Encyclopedia assessment ==
Kister in 1994 gave a qualitative and quantitative comparison of Collier's Encyclopedia with two comparable encyclopaedias, Encyclopædia Britannica and the Encyclopedia Americana. For the quantitative analysis, ten articles were selected at random (circumcision, Charles Drew, Galileo, Philip Glass, heart disease, IQ, panda bear, sexual harassment, Shroud of Turin and Uzbekistan) and letter grades (A–D, F) were awarded in four categories: coverage, accuracy, clarity, and recency. In all four categories and for all three encyclopaedias, the four average grades fell between B− and B+, chiefly because not one encyclopaedia had an article on sexual harassment in 1994. In the accuracy category, Collier's received one D and seven As. Encyclopedia Americana received eight As, and the Britannica received one D and eight As; thus, Collier's received an average score of 92% for accuracy to Americana's 95% and Britannica's 92%. In the timeliness category, Collier's averaged an 85% to Americana's 90% and Britannica's 86%. After a more thorough qualitative comparison of all three encyclopedias, Kister recommended Collier's Encyclopedia primarily on the strength of its writing, presentation and navigation.

Kister's reviewing career was assessed by Simon Garfield in 2023 in his book on the history of encyclopedias, All the Knowledge in the World: The Extraordinary History of the Encyclopedia.

== Books ==
- Kister's Atlas Buying Guide: General English-Language World Atlases Available in North America. Phoenix: The Oryx Press, 1984.
- Kister's Best Dictionaries for Adults & Young People: A Comparative Guide. Phoenix: The Oryx Press, 1992.
- Kister's Best Encyclopedias: A Comparative Guide to General and Specialized Encyclopedias, Second Edition. Phoenix: The Oryx Press, 1994.

"in-depth evaluations of 77 general encyclopedias, including electronic products; reviews of some 800 subject-specific encyclopedias (covering 29 subjects); and reviews of 44 foreign language encyclopedias covering nine languages."

- Eric Moon: The Life and Library Times. Jefferson: McFarland & Company, Inc., 2002.

"...well written, impeccably documented, and extensively indexed. It should be in the collections of academic libraries throughout the United States and the United Kingdom, particularly those serving institutions with graduate programs in library and information science."

- Florida on the Boil: Recommended Novels and Short-Story Collections Set in the Sunshine State. Philadelphia: Xlibris, 2007.
