= The 1995 Grolier Multimedia Encyclopedia =

- Developer: Grolier Electronic Publishing
- Release: 1994
- Operating system: Windows; Macintosh

The 1995 Grolier Multimedia Encyclopedia is a software CD-ROM from Grolier Electronic Publishing. It is for ages 14 and up.

== Summary ==
The 1995 Grolier Multimedia Encyclopedia contains 33,000 articles, 8000 pictures, 325 high-resolution maps and other features. The "Pathmakers" feature showcases contemporary figures such as Jackie Joyner-Kersee, Buzz Aldrin, and Kurt Vonnegut Jr. in video interviews.

== Development ==
The Macintosh version of The 1995 Grolier Multimedia Encyclopedia was released in December 1994.

== Reception ==
CNET called The 1995 Grolier Multimedia Encyclopedia a valuable resource for your CD-ROM library. The Indianapolis Star gave The 1995 Grolier Multimedia Encyclopedia a score of 3 out of 4.
