= The Chronicles of Avantia =

Book series by Adam Blade

The Chronicles Of Avantia
- First Hero; Chasing Evil; Call To War; Fire And Fury
- Author: Adam Blade
- Illustrator: David Wyatt, Steve Sims
- Country: United Kingdom
- Language: English
- Genre: Children's Fantasy
- Publisher: Orchard Books
- Published: 2010–present
- Media type: Print (hardcover and paperback)

The Chronicles of Avantia is a series of books by Adam Blade, a spin-off series of Beast Quest. The series is a prequel of Beast Quest, being set in ancient Avantia.

== Characters ==
=== Humans ===
- Tanner is the main character of the Chronicles of Avantia series. He is the Chosen Rider of a phoenix-Beast called Firepos. His father died while his mother was kidnapped in a savage attack on his home village, Forton, by the malevolent warlord called Derthsin, when he was seven years old. When he is 14 he sets out across Avantia to try to stop Derthsin from taking over the land, and meets some new people along the way. His weapon of choice is a sword. In Call to War he drinks beast blood making him stronger.
- Gwen is first encountered in Colweir, the nearest village to Forton, where Tanner goes after being told to "find the Mapmaker" by his grandmother, Esme, with her last breath. Gwen wields four throwing axes and a rapier that has the shape of a wolf head on the hilt. She is another Chosen Rider, of a wolf-Beast called Gulkien. She tags along with Tanner after Derthsin's armies destroy Colweir, but only because Gulkien, her beast, trusts Firepos, Tanner's beast.
- Grandmother Esme is Tanner's very wise grandmother. She is very good at healing wounds with herbs – this is proven when a horserider, Drew, who works on the fields outside the village, is severely injured coming back from Harron, a nearby town, and Esme heals his wounds in hours. She tells Tanner with her last words to go to Colweir and find the Mapmaker who lives there.
- Derthsin is the main antagonist of the Chronicles Of Avantia series. He is the warlord who destroys Forton in the prologue of the first book, with the control of the 4 Beasts of Avantia via the Mask Of Death. After years in the volcano he has learned how to control and create flames and lava making him immune to it. The warlord also has the ability to shoot black beams of energy.
- General Gor is Derthsin's underling, who tries to kill Tanner and the other Riders before they can get to Derthsin's lair. He rides a Dark Beast called Varlot, a horse-Beast.
- Castor is the Chosen Rider of Nera, a Beast that takes the shape of a puma. He is arrogant, and big-headed, but an expert swordsman, and decides to help Tanner and Gwen with their quest to defeat Derthsin. He is first encountered in the village of Colton, where the other two Riders end up after their Beasts discover Nera there.
- Rufus is the Chosen Rider of Falkor, a Beast that takes the form of a large snake. Rufus has the ability to shoot extremely powerful blue beams of magic, but this uses up most of his energy, so he only does this sparingly. A dark secret is revealed about him in the last book.
- Geffen is the twin brother of Gwen and betrayed the secrets of the map to general Gor. After dying in the old mines by an avalanche he was brought back to life as a living corpse, forced to obey orders.
- Vendrake is a dark wizard and a servant of Derthsin who rides in a vulture-drawn chariot and wields a cat-o-nine tails. He was tortured to death by Derthsin years ago and was turned into a living corpse, the same thing that he did to Geffen.
- Captain Brutus works for Derthsin and commands the soldiers in the old mines. When the boys stop working he whips them with his whip. He is last seen in "Chasing Evil".

=== Beasts ===
- Firepos is the young phoenix-Beast of whom Tanner is the Chosen Rider. She is ferocious, and can shoot fireballs from her talons at will. She heals her own wounds, however severe, by some of her flames enveloping the wound. She loses this ability after Tanner drinks her blood making her grow weaker. She trained Tanner after she first met him in the prologue of "First Hero" so that he was prepared to fight. By the time of Beast Quest, she is known as Epos.
- Gulkien is a wolf-Beast, whose Chosen Rider is Gwen, a girl of spirit. Gulkien attacks by means of his savage claws and razor-sharp fangs. Gulkien can also heal his wounds by sprouting fur over the area affected.
- Nera is a puma-Beast, and Castor is her Chosen Rider. Nera's characteristic is superb speed - she can race across vast landscapes in minutes, much faster than the other Beasts. It is discovered that she was trained by Firepos.
- Falkor is a snake-beast and his Chosen Rider is Rufus. Falkor can slither almost as fast as Nera runs. He fights by striking men and breaking their bones. The colour of his scales seems to reflect his mood.
- Varlot is a Dark Beast who can reject a Chosen Rider, which is normally impossible. Varlot can transform from a normal horse into a ferocious stallion with super strength. He is Derthsin's Beast, but Gor is his Rider. Each time he appears he grows stronger, becoming taller, having armour over his face, being able to talk and getting a huge sword.
- Troiden is a massive slug-like creature that digs the tunnels in the mines that Derthsin uses to make weapons. He has sensor orb the size of a head. Troiden was killed when the mines collapsed.
- Anoret is an extremely powerful beast that was made stronger when the other beast blended their blood. Years ago Derthsin tricked her and Anoret's face became the Mask of Death making her appearance became disgusting, and she then must obey the wearer. She has been part of the volcano wall ever since. Anoret is described as having a skeletal-like face, her eyes on stalks, spikes down her back, a long tail, being three times as tall as Firepos and having three claws on each hand.
- A giant vulture serves Vendrake that is almost as tall as Firepos and spits acid. It is unknown if it is actually a Beast or just something that Vendrake mutated. It pulls his flying chariot.

== Novels ==
=== First Hero ===
Avantia stands on the edge of an abyss. Dark armies, led by a malevolent warlord, are mustering on its borders. But destiny has chosen an unlikely hero to fight the threat… 15-year-old Tanner is no ordinary boy. Son of a murdered father, and abducted mother, his life is steeped in tragedy. As the "Chosen Rider" of a ferocious young flame bird called Firepos, it is up to him to turn the tide of war that threatens to engulf the land.

=== Chasing Evil ===
Tanner and his Flame Bird, Firepos, have met a companion, another Chosen Rider, Gwen, to a ferocious wolf-Beast, Gulkien. Together they must race against Derthsin, his Dark Beast, Varlot, Derthsin's underling General Gor, and Gor's army to locate the missing pieces of the Mask of Death. If evil Derthsin gets the mask first, Avantia will be destroyed in a reign of fire. Who will Tanner meet next on his journey? And what horrors lurk in the Hidden Mine’s endless tunnels? The Battle for Avantia is about to begin...

=== Call To War ===
Avantia burns in the fires of war. Derthsin’s evil armies swarm the land, and Tanner and the Chosen Riders are all that stand in their way. Will they encounter more Beasts on their treacherous journey to the Southern Caves? And will the dark forces that seek control of Tanner prevent the Riders from fulfilling their destiny...?

=== Fire and Fury ===
The war for Avantia has reached a terrifying climax. Tanner and his companions must face their nemesis, the warlord Derthsin, amongst the deadly flames of his volcanic lair. If they fail, Derthsin will wear the Mask of Death and Avantia will be destroyed. Can the companions brave the end together, or will Derthsin’s evil tear them apart?
