= Encyclopedia Americana =

Encyclopedia written in American English

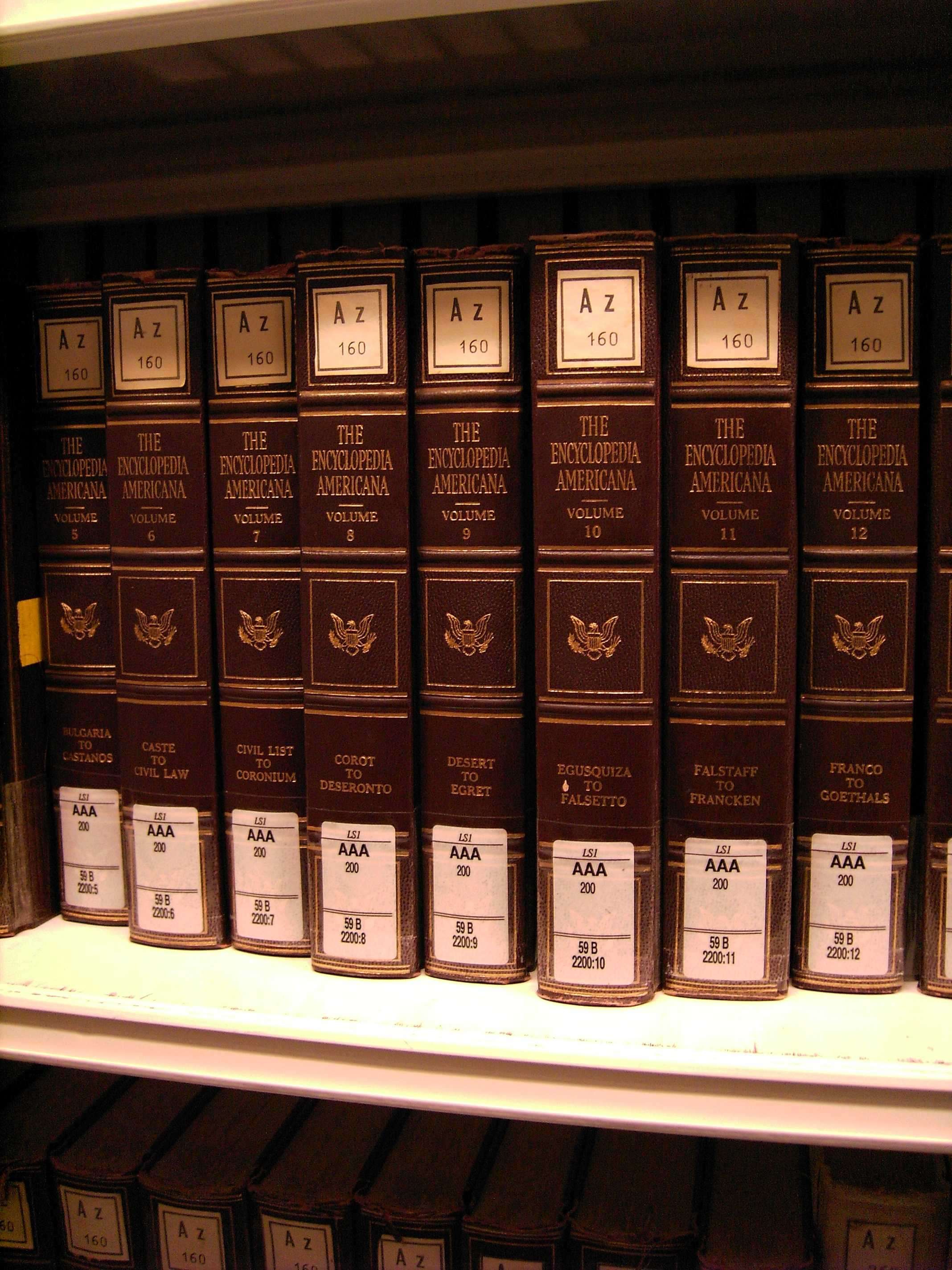
- Author: Francis Lieber (1800–1872)
- Language: English
- Subject: General
- Published: 1829–2018
- Publisher: Scholastic
- Media type: 1

The Encyclopedia Americana was a general encyclopedia written in American English. It was the first general encyclopedia of any magnitude to be published in North America. With Collier's Encyclopedia and Encyclopædia Britannica, Encyclopedia Americana became one of the three major and large English-language general encyclopedias; the three were sometimes collectively called "the ABCs of encyclopedias". Following the acquisition of Grolier in 2000, Scholastic took over production; in 2018, the Encyclopedia Americana was merged into the Scholastic GO! database.

The encyclopedia has more than 45,000 articles, most of them more than 500 words and many running to considerable length (the "United States" article is over 300,000 words). Americana is international in scope and is known for its detailed coverage of American and Canadian geography and history. Americana is also known for its strong bibliographic coverage, as well as scientific and technical subjects. Written by 6,500 contributors, the Encyclopedia Americana includes over 9,000 bibliographies, 150,000 cross-references, 1,000+ tables, 1,200 maps, and almost 4,500 black-and-white line art and color images. It also has 680 fact boxes. Major articles are signed by their contributors, many being scholars pre-eminent in their field.

Long available as a 30-volume print set, the Encyclopedia Americana is now marketed as an online encyclopedia requiring a subscription. In March 2008, Scholastic said that print sales remained good but that the company was still deciding on the future of the print edition. The company's final print edition was released in 2006.

== History and predecessors ==
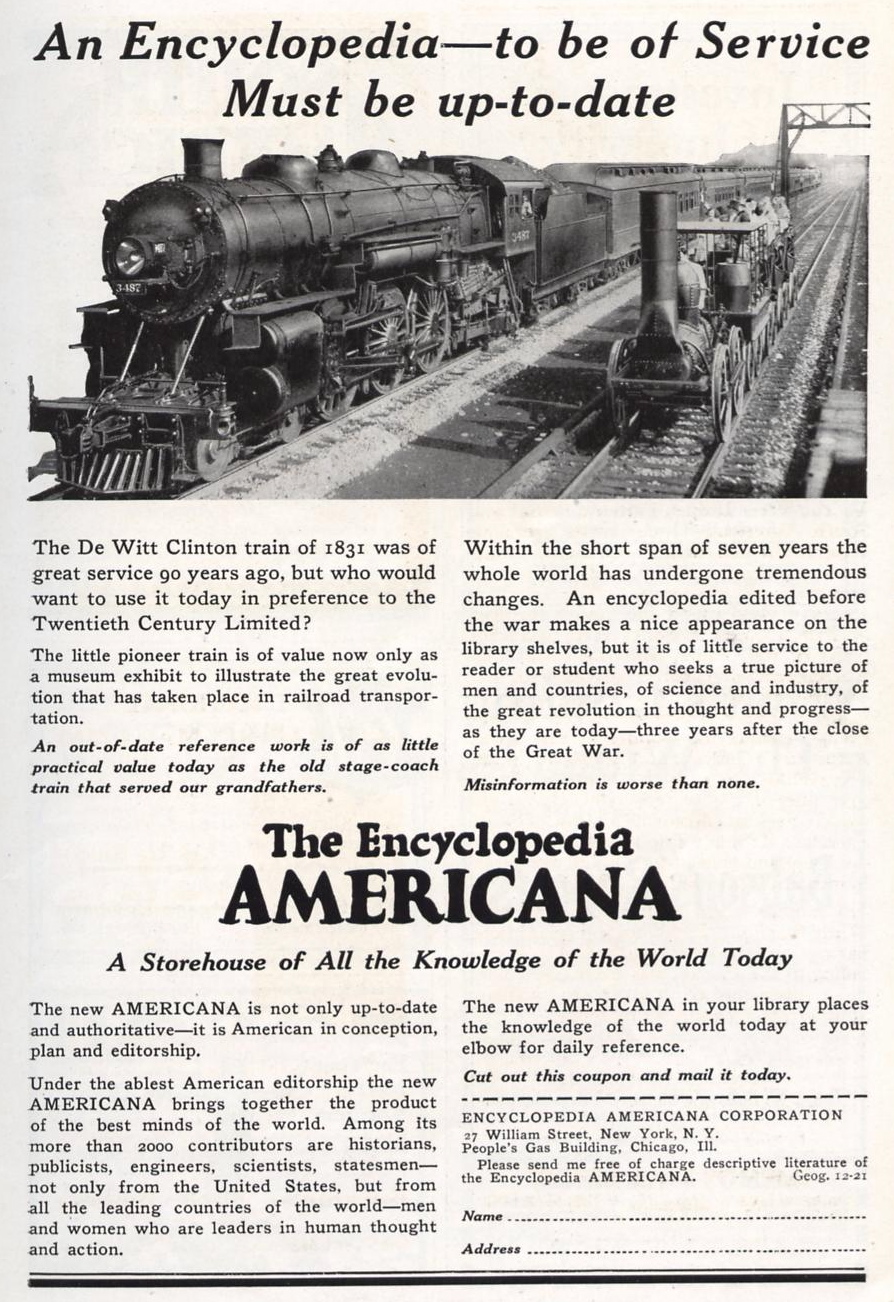
This 1921 advertisement for the Encyclopedia Americana suggests that other encyclopedias are as out-of-date as the locomotives of 90 years earlier.

There have been three separate works using the title Encyclopedia Americana.

The first work began publication in 1829 by Francis Lieber, an influential 19th century German-American scholar. The 13 volumes of the first edition were completed in 1833, and other editions and printings followed in 1835, 1836, 1847–1848, 1849 and 1858. According to one contemporary source, the original price in 1832, at which time several volumes had been issued, was to be $2.50 per volume for 12 volumes, or $30 in total. At first, Lieber planned only an English-language translation of the 7th edition of the popular German encyclopedia Konversations-Lexikon, familiarly known as Brockhaus after its publisher Friedrich Arnold Brockhaus. However, as work on the new encyclopedia progressed, Lieber sought and added original articles by leading U.S. writers and intellectuals of the day. United States Supreme Court Justice Joseph Story, for instance, contributed more than 120 pages of legal material to the 1st edition. Hence, when the Americana began appearing some 165 years ago, it represented a hybrid of 2 cultures, German and American.

A second Encyclopedia Americana was published by J.M. Stoddart between 1883 and 1889, as a supplement to American reprintings of the 9th edition of the Encyclopædia Britannica. It was four quarto volumes meant to "extend and complete the articles in Britannica". Stoddart's work, however, is not connected to the earlier work by Lieber.

In 1902, a new, 16-volume Encyclopedia Americana was published under the editorial supervision of Scientific American magazine. The magazine's editor, Frederick Converse Beach, was editor-in-chief, assisted by hundreds of eminent scholars and authorities as consulting editors and article authors. Beach also expanded the encyclopedia's coverage, especially in the area of the physical and life sciences. George Edwin Rines was appointed managing editor in 1903. Between 1903 and 1906 the publisher was R.S. Peale & Co. From 1906 through 1936, Encyclopedia Americana was published by the Americana Corporation, with the editorial support of Scientific American. The relationship with Scientific American was terminated in 1911. From 1907 to 1912, the encyclopedia was published as The Americana.

In 1918–20, the Americana Corporation published a new, International, 30-volume edition, with George Edwin Rines continuing as editor-in-chief. It was the last entirely new edition of the encyclopedia. A yearbook, which appeared under a variety of titles, was also published each year beginning in 1923 and continuing until 2008.

In 1936, the Americana Corporation was purchased by The Grolier Society, later renamed Grolier Incorporated. The Americana Corporation's president, J. Cooper Graham, became a vice president of Grolier. By the late1960s, Grolier's annual sales of Encyclopedia Americana and its sister publications under Grolier—The Book of Knowledge, the American Peoples Encyclopedia, the Book of Popular Science, and Lands and Peoples were over $181 million, and the company held a 30 percent market share as the leading publisher of encyclopedias in the United States. Grolier's corporate headquarters were in a large building (variously named the Americana Building and the Grolier Building) in Midtown Manhattan, at 575 Lexington Avenue. Sales during this period were accomplished primarily through mail-order and door-to-door operations. Telemarketing and third-party distribution of Encyclopedia Americana through Grolier's Lexicon Publications subsidiary added to sales volumes in the 1970s. By the late 1970s, Grolier had moved its operations to Danbury, Connecticut.

== Later developments ==
In 1988, Grolier was purchased by the French media company Hachette, which owned a well-known French-language encyclopedia, the Hachette Encyclopedia. Hachette was later absorbed by the French conglomerate the Lagardère Group.

A CD-ROM version of the encyclopedia was published in 1995. Although the text and images were stored on separate disks, it was in keeping with the standards current at the time. More importantly, the work had been digitized, allowing for the release of an online version in 1997. Over the next few years, the product was augmented with additional features, functions, supplementary references, Internet links, and a current events journal. A redesigned interface and partly re-engineered product, featuring enhanced search capabilities and a first-ever ADA-compliant, text-only version for users with disabilities, was presented in 2002.

The acquisition of Grolier by Scholastic for US$400 million, took place in 2000. The new owners projected a 30% increase in operating income, although historically Grolier had experienced earnings of 7% to 8% on income. Following the acquisition, Americana became part of a suite of educational resources, with those resources including The New Book of Knowledge, The New Book of Popular Science, America the Beautiful, Grolier Multimedia Encyclopedia, Amazing Animals of the World, and Lands and People. All of those resources formed Grolier Online (now called Scholastic GO!). Staff reductions as a means of controlling costs also followed soon thereafter, even while an effort was made to augment the sales force. Cuts occurred every year between 2000 and 2007, leaving a much-depleted workforce to carry out the duties of maintaining a large encyclopedia database.

In 2004, Scholastic stated that Americana's 2,500 online articles are being revised annually. Today, Americana lives on as an integral database within the Scholastic GO! product.

== Editors-in-Chief ==
- Frederick Converse Beach, 1902–1917. Engineer and editor of Scientific American magazine.
- George Edwin Rines, 1917–1920. Author and editor.
- A. H. McDannald, 1920–1948. Reporter (Baltimore News and Baltimore Evening Sun), editor, and author.
- Lavinia P. Dudley, 1948–1964. Editor (Encyclopædia Britannica and Encyclopedia Americana) and manager; first woman to head a major American reference publication.
- George A. Cornish, 1965–1970. Reporter (New York Herald Tribune) and editor.
- Bernard S. Cayne, 1970–1980. Educational researcher (Educational Testing Service, Harvard Educational Review), editor (Ginn & Co., Collier's Encyclopedia, Macmillan) and business executive (Grolier Inc.).
- Alan H. Smith, 1980–1985. Editor (Grolier/Encyclopedia Americana)
- David T. Holland, 1985–1991. Editor (Harcourt Brace, Grolier/Encyclopedia Americana).
- Mark Cummings, 1991–2000. Editor (Macmillan, Oxford University Press).
- Michael Shally-Jensen, 2000–2005. Editor (Merriam-Webster/Encyclopædia Britannica).
- K. Anne Ranson, 2005–2006. Editor (Academic American Encyclopedia, Grolier Multimedia Encyclopedia).
- Joseph M. Castagno, 2006–present. Editor (Grolier/Lands and Peoples, New Book of Popular Science).

== See also ==
- Lists of encyclopedias
