= PC Player (British magazine) =

British video game magazine

- PC Player, issue 3, February 1994
- Editor: John Davison
- Categories: Computer magazines
- Frequency: Monthly
- First issue: December 1993
- Final issue Number: October 1994; 11
- Company: Maverick Magazines
- Country: United Kingdom
- Based in: Oxford
- Language: English
- ISSN: 1351-0851

PC Player was a short lived PC videogaming magazine published in the UK by Maverick Magazines. Launched in December 1993 with John Davison as editor, PC Player devoted the majority of its pages covering simulation, adventure and strategy games and often featured games over six page spreads. Reviews featured a five star rating system and an independent expert from other magazines gave additional comments on the bigger reviews. Other more action orientated games were given smaller coverage in a dedicated round up section. Content wise, the magazine featured news, articles, reviews, previews, tips and columns on all things gaming. Hugh Gollner, publisher and owner of Maverick Magazines, granted Out-of-Print Archive permission to release digital versions of the magazine.
