= Fire and Fury (game) =

Miniatures wargame

Cover of first edition, 1990

Fire and Fury is a miniatures wargame about the American Civil War.

== Publication history ==
Fire and Fury, a miniatures wargame that simulates battles of the American Civil War, was designed by Richard W. Hasenauer and published as a 96-page hardcover book in 1990 by Dave Waxtel and Quantum Publishing. Over 10,000 copies of the book were sold. Two years later, a book of western battle scenarios was published.

In 2010, a second edition of the game, also written by Hasenauer, was published by Fire and Fury Games.

== Description ==
=== First edition ===
The first edition of Fire and Fury describes rules for miniatures wargames that simulates battles of the American Civil War at the tactical (brigade) level. The rules are designed for 15 mm figures, which represent brigades — 4–6 single battalion regiments, or a brigade of cavalry, or 6–8 artillery pieces. Casualty losses are calculated per 150 or 200 soldiers. The game uses a map scale of one inch to 45 or 60 yards, and a time scale of 20–30 minutes of real time per complete turn. Ten-sided dice are used to introduce randomness to the battlefield to simulate the fog of war at the brigade level. The movement and morale system also introduces random elements to movement and morale, based on a unit's experience and casualty-induced battle fatigue. This game was also the first to introduce modelled status markers to mark units that are disordered, low on ammunition, etc.

The 34-page Great Western Battles Scenario Book (1992) contains simulations of the Battles of Shiloh, Corinth, Stones River, Champion Hill, Chickamauga, and Atlanta.

=== Second edition ===
The second edition, published in 2010, is titled Brigade Fire and Fury. It updates the original edition, keeping the fog of war and movement/morale rules, but adding new rules for Double Quick movement, Cavalry Countercharge, and rules for garrisoning a town. It also adds a Fictional Army Generator for pickup games, rated for early, middle and late in the war. Included in the book are three scenarios: "First Battle of Bull Run", "First Day Battle of Gettysburg", and "Battle of Reams Station".

A second book of rules, Regimental Fire and Fury, was also published in 2010, and focusses on only portions of larger battles, using smaller units.

== Reception ==
In August 2017, Bill Gray reviewed the second edition for Wargamer, and stated that "Rich Hasenauer started a revolution of sorts in the tabletop (historical miniature) wargaming world" with the first edition of Fire and Fury. Gray pointed out that the original edition was one of the first games to have the full color, filled with photographs style rule-book that has dominated the market since then, and that it has "spawned dozens of duplications." In reviewing the second edition, Gray found much to like, including the replacement of the original black and white diagrams with full-color illustrations. He felt that the second edition had retained all of the important elements of the first edition that had been so ground-breaking — "game processes that made F&F so unique and so popular remain solidly intact" — while adding several significant improvements. Gray did disagree with the addition of more complex firing tables that broke down weapons into breechloaders, rifled muskets, etc. As Gray pointed out, historically "though the warring parties used a variety of weapons [...] it was the same general mixture on both sides [giving] an advantage to nobody." Despite this, Gray concluded that the second edition of Fire and Fury was "a top notch game in every respect and mandates a place on every [American Civil War] gamer's shelf [...] Overall I predict strong success."

Fire and Fury was chosen for inclusion in the 2007 book Hobby Games: The 100 Best. In the book, Phil Yates states that "Fire and Fury is one of the best miniature wargames to appear in the last 20 years. It has all of the elements that make a great tabletop game: flavor, simplicity, speed of play, and, most important of all, it feels right for its subject matter — in this case, the American Civil War."
