= Academic American Encyclopedia =

21-volume general English-language encyclopedia

Academic American Encyclopedia is a 21-volume general English-language encyclopedia published in 1980. It was first produced by Arête Publishing, the American subsidiary of the Dutch publishing company VNU (later acquired by Nielsen Media Research in 1999).

== Arête Encyclopedia ==
The initial product, Arête Encyclopedia, was created on a schedule that was too tight, resulting in many difficulties. The first Vice President of Editorial, Larry Lustig, came from Encyclopaedia Britannica and found the pressure too great. He was replaced by Michael Reed who came from World Book Encyclopedia. Reed asked several times to have the production schedule lengthened to straighten out what had already been produced and assure reasonable time for completion. After six months, with no schedule change, Reed resigned rather than have his name associated with the work.

Grolier acquired the encyclopedia in 1982. It has also been published under the names Grolier Academic Encyclopedia, Grolier International Encyclopedia, Lexicon Universal Encyclopedia, Macmillan Family Encyclopedia, Barnes & Noble New American Encyclopedia, and Global International Encyclopedia.

An abridged version was known as the Grolier Encyclopedia of Knowledge.

The full text of the encyclopedia was available to 200 homes in Columbus, Ohio in 1980, as part of an experiment sponsored by OCLC. A year later, the text was available to subscribers of The New York Times Information Bank, the Dow Jones News/Retrieval and CompuServe.

Arête Publishing's interactive version, including illustrations, video and audio stored on videodisk was shown at the Frankfurt Book Fair in 1982.

== Electronic version ==
Grolier published the text-only 1985 CD-ROM The Electronic Encyclopedia from Grolier, based on the Academic American Encyclopedia, which comprised 30,000 entries and 9 million words. Developed by Activenture, it was one of the first commercial CD-ROM titles, and could be navigated through hypertext links, a full text search engine, and a traditional bookshelf interface.

The CD-ROM version offers the complete text of the Academic American Encyclopedia, including illustrations, photographs, animated maps, music and videos. The CD-ROM edition was updated quarterly–a rate which outpaced the print edition. Eventually, the CD-ROM edition was quite different from the print edition.

In 1990, when it was called The New Grolier Electronic Encyclopedia (1988–1991), still pictures were added. This evolved into the 1992 The New Grolier Multimedia Encyclopedia, later named the Grolier Multimedia Encyclopedia.

Grolier published the encyclopedia with numerous name variations: The Electronic Encyclopedia (1986), The Grolier Electronic Encyclopedia (1987), The New Grolier Electronic Encyclopedia (1988–91), The New Grolier Multimedia Encyclopedia (1992). The 1990 edition was the first to feature pictures, and the 1992 edition was the first to deliver video and sound. The last CD-ROM edition published was the 2003 Grolier Multimedia Encyclopedia.

In co-operation with The Software Toolworks company was created The Software Toolworks Illustrated Encyclopedia.

== See also ==
- Grolier Multimedia Encyclopedia
- Lists of encyclopedias
- KnowledgeSet
