= Maverick Magazines =

- Type: Public
- Industry: Magazine publishing
- Founded: 1992
- Founder: Hugh Gollner
- Headquarters: Oxford, United Kingdom
- Area served: United Kingdom
- Key people: Hugh Gollner (Publisher)

Maverick Magazines was a British magazine publishing company during the 1990s.

== Overview ==
Maverick Magazines was founded by Hugh Gollner in 1992. Based in Oxford, Oxfordshire, the company published a handful of computer game and leisure magazines from the early to mid-1990s.

== See also ==
- Games-X
- Mega Drive Advanced Gaming
- PC Player (British magazine)
- The One (magazine) – publisher of this magazine in its final year (1995-1996)
