= Beast Quest =

Series of children's fantasy novels

- Cover of Ferno the Fire Dragon, the debut novel in the series.
- Multiple Series
- Author: "Adam Blade", a pseudonym for various ghostwriters
- Illustrator: David Wyatt, Steve Sims.
- Country: United Kingdom
- Language: English
- Genre: Children's fantasy
- Publisher: Orchard Books
- Published: 2007–present
- Media type: Print (hardback and paperback); E-book
- No. of books: 183

Beast Quest is a best-selling British series of children's fantasy–adventure novels produced by Working Partners Ltd and written by several authors all using the house name Adam Blade. As of October 2024, the main series had achieved a total of 154 books, Master Your Destiny and Special Editions published, and over 20 million copies of the books have been sold altogether since March 2007.

The series is published by Orchard Books in the UK and by Scholastic Corporation in the US and is aimed largely at boys and girls aged 7 and over. The books take place in a world called Avantia, and focus on a young boy named Tom and his friend Elenna as they attempt to restore peace to the land by stopping beasts from causing destruction. Kathryn Flett, writing in London's The Observer, has called the books "almost certainly a work of publishing (if not quite literary) genius...Narnia meets Pokémon via Potter." The books are among the most-borrowed from UK lending libraries.

There is also a companion science fiction series called Sea Quest. From 2021 to 2023, a short spin-off series called Space Wars consisting of four books was published. There is also a 2015 mobile video game based on the Beast Quest book series, and a 2018 version for Xbox One, Nintendo Switch and PS4 (Maximum Games). A new mobile version was released in May 2020 by Animoca.
