= Grolier =

Publisher of educational and reference books

- Parent company: Scholastic
- Founded: 1909; 117 years ago
- Founder: Walter M. Jackson
- Country of origin: United States
- Headquarters location: Danbury, Connecticut
- Publication types: Books
- Official website: go.scholastic.com

Grolier is one of the largest American publishers of general encyclopedias, including The Book of Knowledge (1910), The New Book of Knowledge (1966), The New Book of Popular Science (1972), Encyclopedia Americana (1945), Academic American Encyclopedia (1980), and numerous incarnations of a CD-ROM encyclopedia (1986–2003).

As an educational publishing company Grolier was known for its presence in school libraries and its in-home encyclopedia sales. It also had a strong presence among parents of children under six years old, the market for Grolier's direct mail-to-the-home business.

In June 2000, Grolier became part of Scholastic Corporation, which now maintains Scholastic GO, formerly Grolier Online. Since 2007, the Grolier imprint Orchard Books has published the Rainbow Magic and Beast Quest series in the United Kingdom.

== History ==
The company that became encyclopedia publisher Grolier Incorporated was founded by Walter M. Jackson (1863–1923) as the Grolier Society. Jackson had been the partner of Horace Everett Hooper in publishing the 10th edition of the Encyclopædia Britannica and in developing its 11th edition. He split with Hooper in 1908–1909 in a nasty legal fight after failing to wrest control of the Britannica from Hooper.

The Grolier Society specialized in publishing extra-fine editions of classics and rare literature. The Society was named after the Grolier Club, which had been founded in 1884 to advance the arts involved in making books and which was itself named after a well-known French bibliophile, Jean Grolier de Servières.

In 1910, Jackson purchased the rights to publish the British The Children's Encyclopædia under the name The Book of Knowledge.

In 1936, the company was acquired by its senior sales executive, Fred P. Murphy, who had joined the firm in 1912. Grolier's common stock began trading publicly in 1954, and it was listed on the New York Stock Exchange in 1965.

Under Murphy's leadership, by the mid-1940s, Grolier became one of the largest publishers of general encyclopedias, including The Book of Knowledge and the Encyclopedia Americana. Grolier also published the Grolier Encyclopedia (based on the Harmsworth's Universal Encyclopedia and the Doubleday's Encyclopedia) (1941), American Peoples Encyclopedia (1962), The New Book of Knowledge (1966), the Academic American Encyclopedia (1980), The New Grolier Electronic Encyclopedia (1985 CD-ROM), and the Grolier Multimedia Encyclopedia (1995).

Grolier conducted its encyclopedia sales through subsidiaries Americana Corporation; The Grolier Society; Inc.; R.H. Hinckley Company; Spencer International Press, Inc.; and The Richards Company, Inc. Each subsidiary distributed publications as designated by Grolier. Murphy encouraged a productive rivalry among the subsidiaries, giving their executives broad authority and profit-sharing incentives.

In 1959, Murphy hired John G. Ryan, formerly president of competitor P.F. Collier & Son, as president of The Richards Company. By 1968, Richards' sales, distributing the American Peoples Encyclopedia, exceeded that of the other Grolier encyclopedia subsidiaries.

In 1968, Grolier's annual sales were over $181 million, and the company held a 30 percent market share as the leading publisher of encyclopedias in the United States. Grolier also established a successful mail order subsidiary.

In the 1970s, Grolier declined financially. Fred Murphy retired, and the company merged the sales subsidiaries into what became a less profitable unitary sales force. Grolier also made ill-fated investments in non-publishing ventures, including mobile homes. In 1976, Grolier lost $77 million on sales of $247 million. It threatened to file for bankruptcy if its creditors did not agree to restructure its debts. In the 1980s, with its mail order business expanding, Grolier returned to profitability.

On August 8, 1986, Grolier announced a joint venture partnership with Hal Roach Studios and Robert Halmi, Inc. (both of these companies were later known as Qintex Entertainment) to set up a joint venture, Grolier Home Video, which was designed to set up adaptations of the Grolier book properties.

In 1988, Grolier was purchased by the French media company Hachette, which owned a well-known French-language encyclopedia, the Hachette Encyclopedia. The sale price was $450 million. Hachette was later absorbed by the French conglomerate, the Lagardère Group.

In 1995, Grolier acquired Children's Press, moving its operations from Chicago to New York City and Danbury, Connecticut.

In 1999, Grolier had revenues of $450 million and earnings of approximately $45 million, with $4.5 million in Internet revenues. It had a US$100 million international business, primarily located in the UK, Canada and Asia.

Grolier was purchased by Scholastic for US$400 million in June 2000. The new owners projected a 30% increase in operating income, although historically Grolier had experienced earnings of 7% to 8% on income.

Staff reductions as a means of controlling costs followed soon thereafter, even while an effort was made to augment the sales force. Cuts occurred every year between 2000 and 2007, leaving a much-depleted work force to carry out the duties of maintaining a large encyclopedia database. Scholastic, which specializes in works for the K-8 market (Kindergarten-to-8th grade), has sought to position the Encyclopedia Americana as a reference resource for schools. It remains to be seen whether that strategy, applied to a venerable upper-level (even adult-level) publication, will work in the long run.

The name Grolier is retained as the Scholastic website Scholastic GO. The company exists as Grolier Incorporated.

== Imprints ==
=== Franklin Watts ===
Franklin Watts Inc. was formed in 1942. The company was sold to Grolier in 1957. When the namesake founder retired in 1967, he moved to London to start Franklin Watts Ltd. in 1969. Franklin Watts retired again in 1976.

When Grolier acquired Children's Press in 1995, much of Franklin Watts were published under the Children's Press imprint. When Hachette sold Grolier to Scholastic Corporation in 2000, Scholastic took U.S. rights to Children's Press and Franklin Watts as well. The UK branch exists today as an imprint of Hachette UK's Hachette Children's Books.

=== Orchard Books ===
Orchard Books was founded in 1986 by Grolier as a children's publisher. When editors Neal Porter, Richard Jackson and Melanie Kroupa left Orchard for DK in 1996, Grolier sued the trio. DK and Grolier settled the lawsuit. When Hachette sold Grolier to Scholastic Corporation in 2000, they included the U.S. branch of Orchard Books while retaining the UK branch.

Publications by Orchard UK include the Rainbow Magic and Beast Quest series, as well as titles by Lauren Child, Giles Andreae, Catherine and Laurence Anholt, Cressida Cowell, James Mayhew, Anthony Horowitz, Shoo Rayner, Saviour Pirotta and Michael Lawrence.

Publications by Orchard US include titles by Jenny Nimmo, P. B. Kerr and Patrick Carman.

== CD-ROM editions ==
See Academic American Encyclopedia (Electronic version).

== Video games ==
In 1982, Grolier formed a subsidiary called Grolier Electronic Publishing Inc. Grolier Electronic Publishing Inc. was renamed Grolier Interactive Inc. in February 1996. They made electronic encyclopedias for the Amiga and video games for MS-DOS, Windows, Mac, and PlayStation.

The video games they released include:

Name	Platform(s)	Release date
Wyatt Earp's Old West	Windows, Mac	October 1994
Golden Gate Killer	Windows, Mac	1995
Terror T.R.A.X.: Track of the Vampire	MS-DOS	1995
SFPD Homicide Case File: The Body in the Bay	Windows	1995
Greg Norman Ultimate Challenge Golf	Windows	January 31, 1996
Time Warriors	MS-DOS, Windows	1997
Banzai Bug	Windows	1997
Grolier's Cornerstone Home	Windows, Mac	April 1997
Perfect Assassin	Windows, PlayStation	November 1997
Xenocracy	Windows, PlayStation	1998
V2000 (Also known as Virus 2000)	Windows, PlayStation	October 1998
Asghan: The Dragon Slayer	Windows	December 1998
Tank Racer	Windows, PlayStation	March 26, 1999

Grolier Interactive ceased releasing video games when Grolier was bought by Scholastic.

== Software ==
- The 1995 Grolier Multimedia Encyclopedia
- The 1995 Guinness Multimedia Disc of Records
- The 1996 Grolier Multimedia Encyclopedia

== See also ==
- List of online encyclopedias
