= List of encyclopedias in Spanish =

This is a list of encyclopedias in the Spanish language, also known as Castilian. Some encyclopedias in this list are (originally) written in different languages used in Spain, such as Catalan, Basque, Aragonese or Asturian, and only later translated into Spanish. Many others were first published in Spanish, but in Latin America.

Printed (paper)
Digital (online)
Both*

*This usually means that volumes of the encyclopaedia were originally printed on paper, but at some point (usually in the 1990s or early 2000s), the encyclopaedia has been digitised and made available in whole or in part in electronic form (usually online, but not necessarily). New entries may or may not be added, while old entries (originally printed) may or may not be updated. Usually, publication of paper-printed editions has been discontinued.

Title in Spanish	Title in English	Published
Wikipedia en aragonés	Aragonese Wikipedia	2004–present
Wikipedia n'asturianu	Asturian Wikipedia	2004–present
Enciclopedia Auñamendi	Auñamendi Encyclopedia	1969–present
Biblioteca de al-Andalus	Library of al-Andalus	2004–2017
Diccionario enciclopédico hispano-americano de literatura, ciencias y artes	Spanish-American Encyclopaedic Dictionary of Literature, Sciences and Arts	1887–1899
Enciclopedia Heráldica Hispano-Americana	Encyclopedia of Spanish-American Heraldry	1919–1963
Enciclopedia moderna	Modern Encyclopedia	1851–1855
Enciclopedia Universal Micronet	Micronet Universal Encyclopedia	1995–2012 (DVD)
Enciclopedia de la cultura popular coreana (Note: Originally launched online in February 2001 in Korean. Since then translated into several other languages, including English, Chinese, and Spanish.)	Encyclopedia of Korean Folk Culture	2001–present
Enciclopedia de la vida (Note: Available online in 19 languages, one of which is Spanish.)	Encyclopedia of Life	2008–present
Enciclopedia universal ilustrada europeo-americana	European-American Illustrated Universal Encyclopaedia	1908–2003
Focus (Note: Originally written in Swedish, later translated to Danish, Norwegian, French, Portuguese, and Spanish.)	Focus	1958–1960
Gran Enciclopedia de Andalucía	Great Encyclopaedia of Andalusia	1979–1981
Gran Enciclopedia Galega Silverio Cañada	Great Galician Encyclopaedia Silverio Cañada	1974–2005
Llibre de les dones (Note: Originally written in Catalan, later translated into Spanish in 1542.)	Book of Women	c. 1390–1542
Lo Crestià (Note: Written in Catalan.)	The Christian	c. 1379–1484
El Tesoro de la Juventud (Note: Originally published in English as Book of Knowledge in 1915, itself a U.S. adaption of The Children's Encyclopædia edition of 1912, published in London.)	The Treasure of Youth	c. 1920s
El Nuevo Tesoro de la Juventud (Note: Originally published in English as The New Book of Knowledge in 1966.)	The New Treasure of Youth	c. 1968–1984
Arbre de Sciència (Note: Originally written in Catalan under the title Arbre de la ciència, later translated into Latin as Arbor Scientiae (e.g. in 1505) and into Spanish as Arbre de Sciència.)	Tree of Science	c. 1295–1505
Wikipedia en español	Spanish Wikipedia	2001–present
