= Seogwipo Rural Five-Day Market =

Traditional market in Seogwipo, South Korea

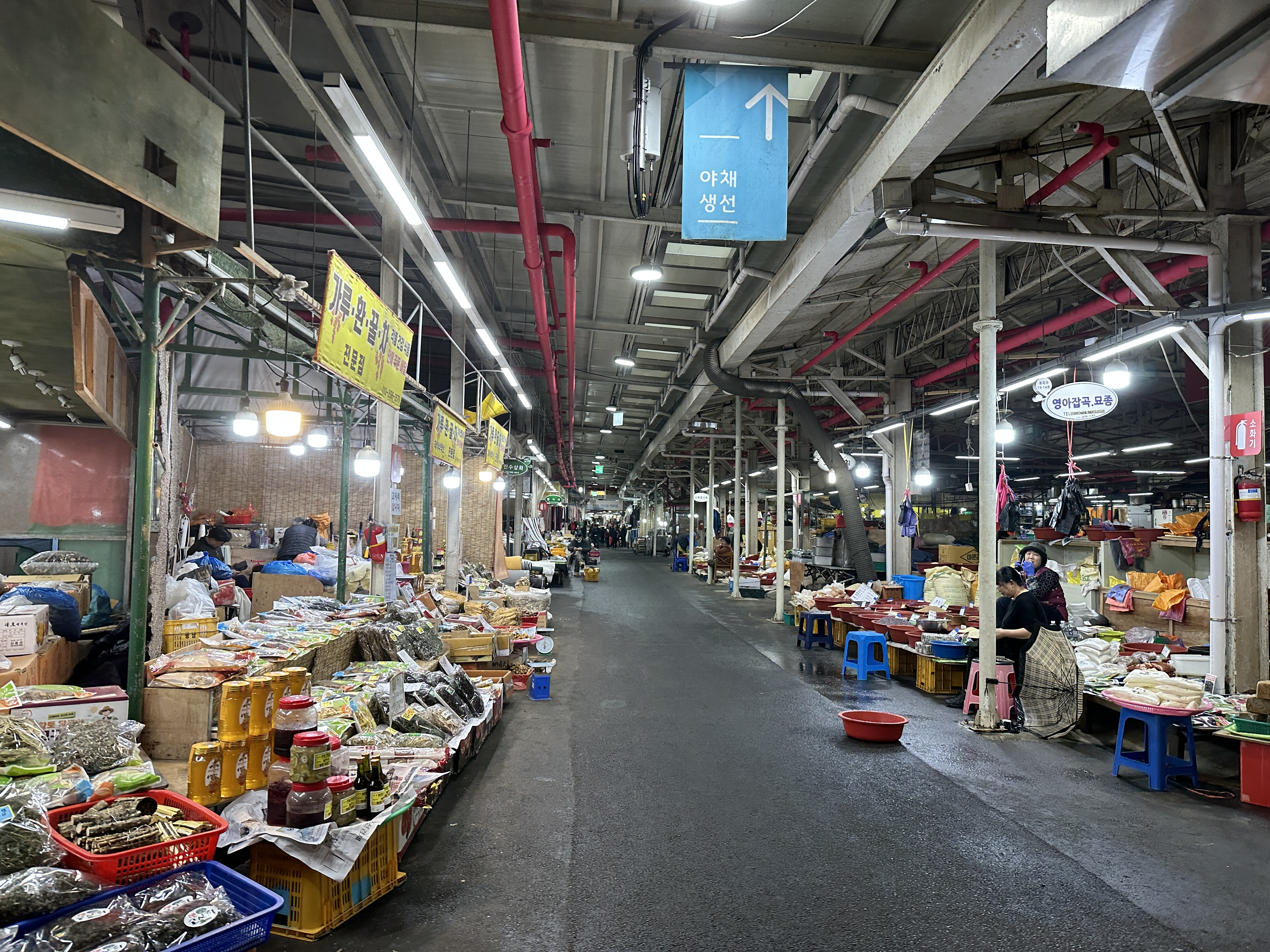
- Part of the market (2023)
- Location: Donghong-dong, Seogwipo, Jeju Province, South Korea; 33.2672°N 126.5737°E
- Opening date: September 1995
- Parking: 1,000
- Website: sgp5.market.jeju.kr
- Interactive map of Seogwipo Rural Five-Day Market

Seogwipo Rural Five-Day Market (Korean: 서귀포시 향토 오일장; Hanja: 西歸浦鄕土五日市場) is a traditional market that operates once every five days, located in Donghong-dong, Seogwipo, South Korea.

The market operates on the 4th, 9th, 14th, 19th, 24th, and 29th of each month. It is the largest such five-day market in Seogwipo (the southern half of Jeju Island).

== Description ==
The market's concept is based on a Joseon-era model, where market days are spaced out every five days. The market sells a wide variety of foods, souvenirs, clothing, art, and crafts. The market has hosted events such as raffles for its customers. It reportedly has a monthly concert and performance.

The market was approved to be created on March 22, 1974, initially for a different location, in Seohong-dong. It eventually opened in September 1995 at its current location. The market was renovated beginning in 1999. More land for it was purchased in 2002. It was expanded in 2006, and the parking lot was expanded in 2007. An undated Encyclopedia of Korean Local Culture article claimed that a performance hall and other facilities were being built for the market. The market reportedly experienced a lull in business during the COVID-19 pandemic.

It has an area of 32,784 m^{2} (352,880 ft^{2}), with businesses occupying 10,916 m^{2} (117,500 ft^{2}) of space. It has parking capacity for 1,000 cars, reportedly the most for a market in South Korea. It had 534 businesses in 2022. Its average daily sales in 2022 was reportedly ₩287.69 million. It reportedly had an average of 28,833 visitors per day. The market is reportedly popular for both tourists and locals, who appreciate its low prices. The high volume of visitors has led to a reported consistent shortage of parking. In 2017, it was announced that a new parking structure for 300 more vehicles would be constructed for the market.

== Gallery ==
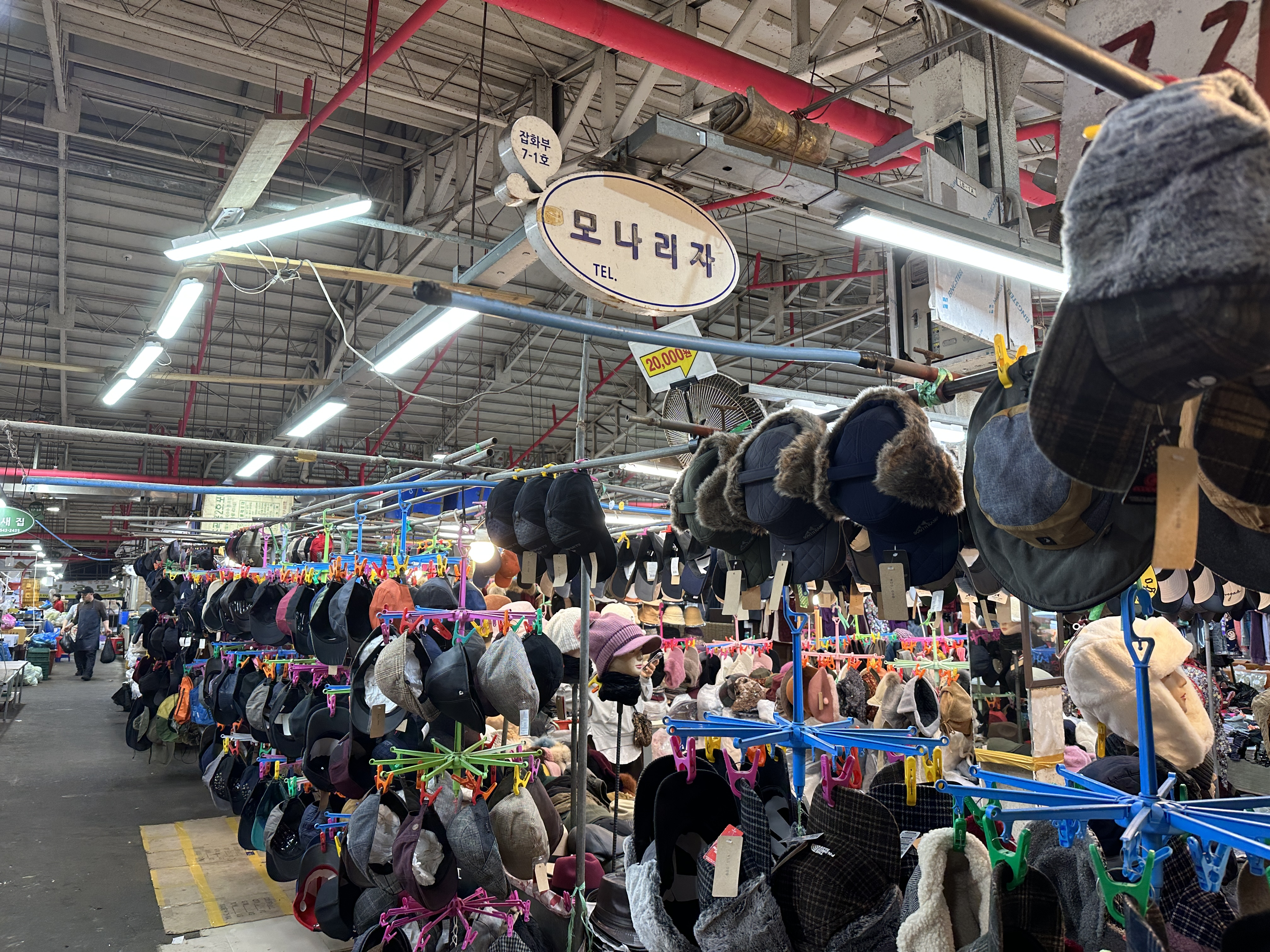
A hat store (2023)

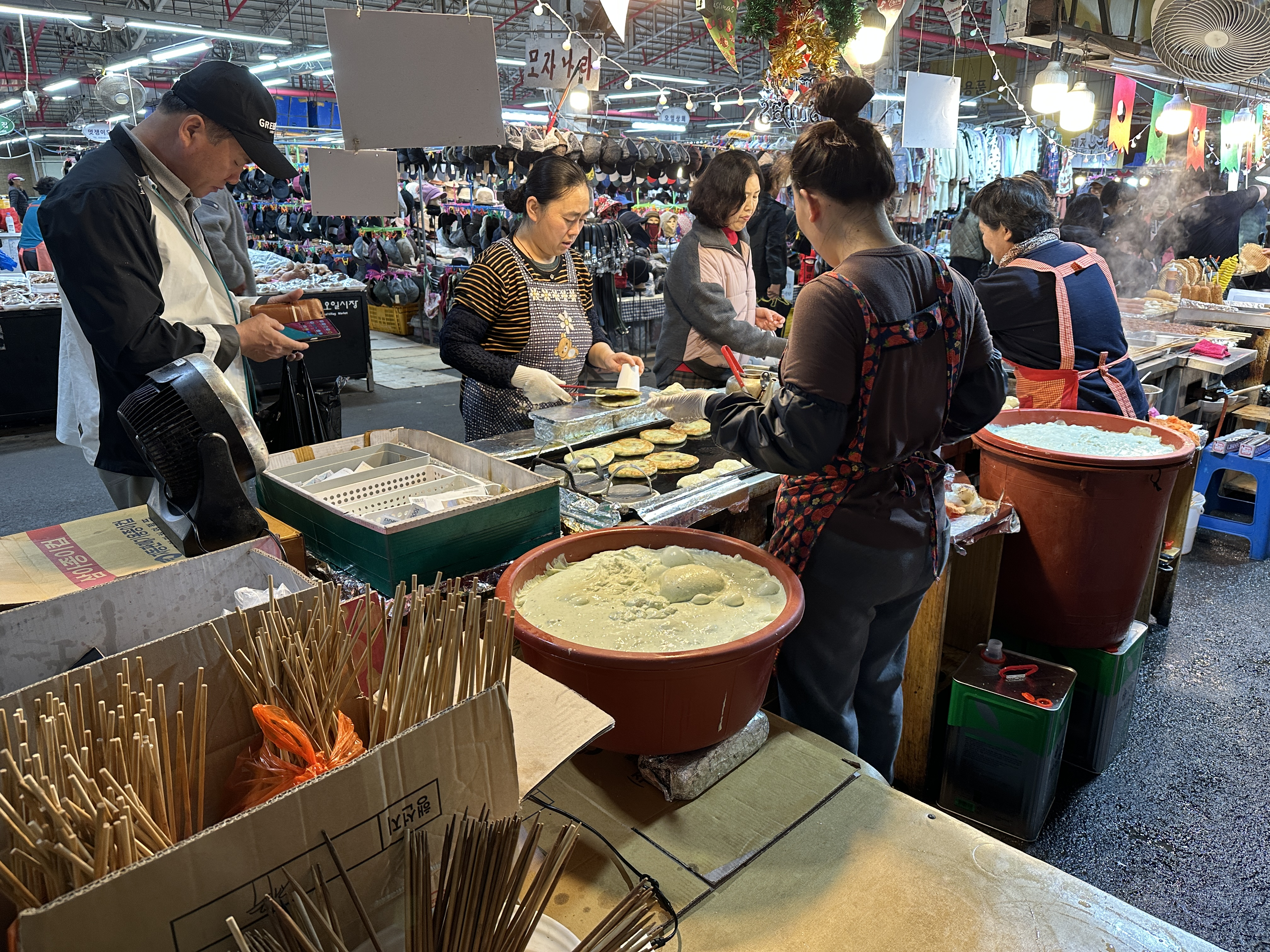
A hotteok vendor (2023)

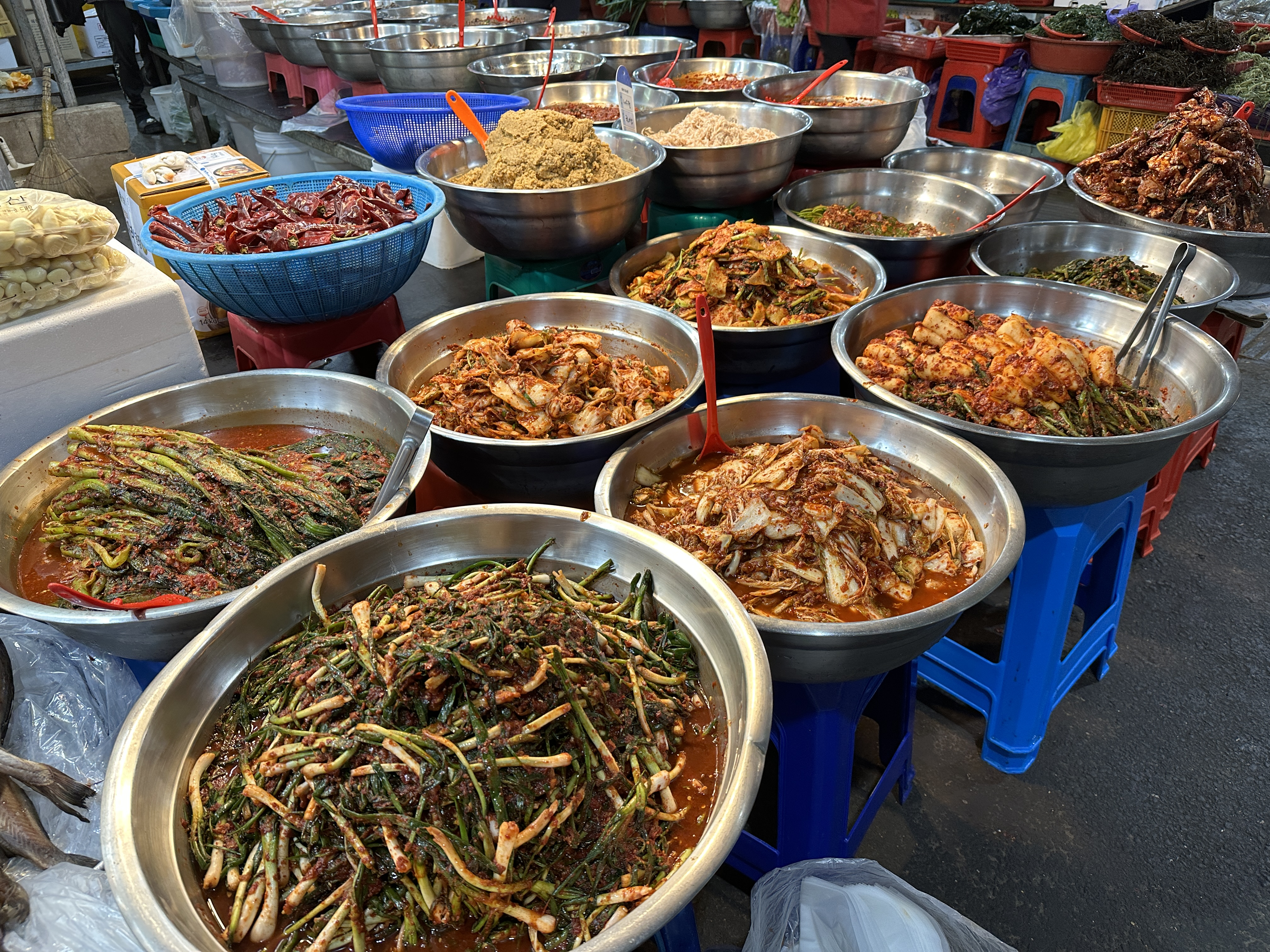
Banchan for sale (2023)

== See also ==
- List of markets in South Korea
- Seogwipo Maeil Olle Market
