= El Nuevo Tesoro de la Juventud =

Spanish-language encyclopedia published by Grolier

- Author: Jackson Grolier
- Language: Spanish
- Subject: General
- Genre: Reference encyclopedia
- Publisher: Grolier International, Inc.
- Publication date: 1968–1984
- Publication place: Mexico
- Media type: 20 Hardback Volumes

El Nuevo Tesoro de la Juventud: Enciclopedia de conocimientos (English: The New Treasure of Youth: Encyclopaedia of Knowledge; tesoro could also mean "thesaurus") is a general Spanish-language encyclopedia for children, published by Grolier International, Inc. in Mexico City. While the Nuevo Tesoro covers general knowledge, it also offers a comprehensive narrative of the history of Mexico in the Spanish language, amongst other things. Various editions, containing 20 hardback volumes, were published between 1968 and 1984. Most chapters are titled El Libro de... ("The Book of...") or Historia de la... ("History of the...").

The Nuevo Tesoro is an updated and expanded version of its predecessor, the 20-volume El Tesoro de la Juventud ("The Treasure of the Youth"), first published in Argentina in the 1920s as a Spanish-language translation of Grolier founder Walter Montgomery Jackson's Book of Knowledge of 1915 (itself a U.S. adaptation of The Children's Encyclopædia, originally published in London). The 1966 English edition of The New Book of Knowledge served as the direct source for the material of El Nuevo Tesoro de la Juventud. It was intended for the Latin American market, but could also be purchased in the United States and Canada.

== Bibliography ==
- Kister, Kenneth F. (1994). Kister's Best Encyclopedias. Phoenix, Arizona: Greenwood. ISBN 0-89774-744-5.
