= Seogwipo Maeil Olle Market =

Traditional market in Seogwipo, South Korea

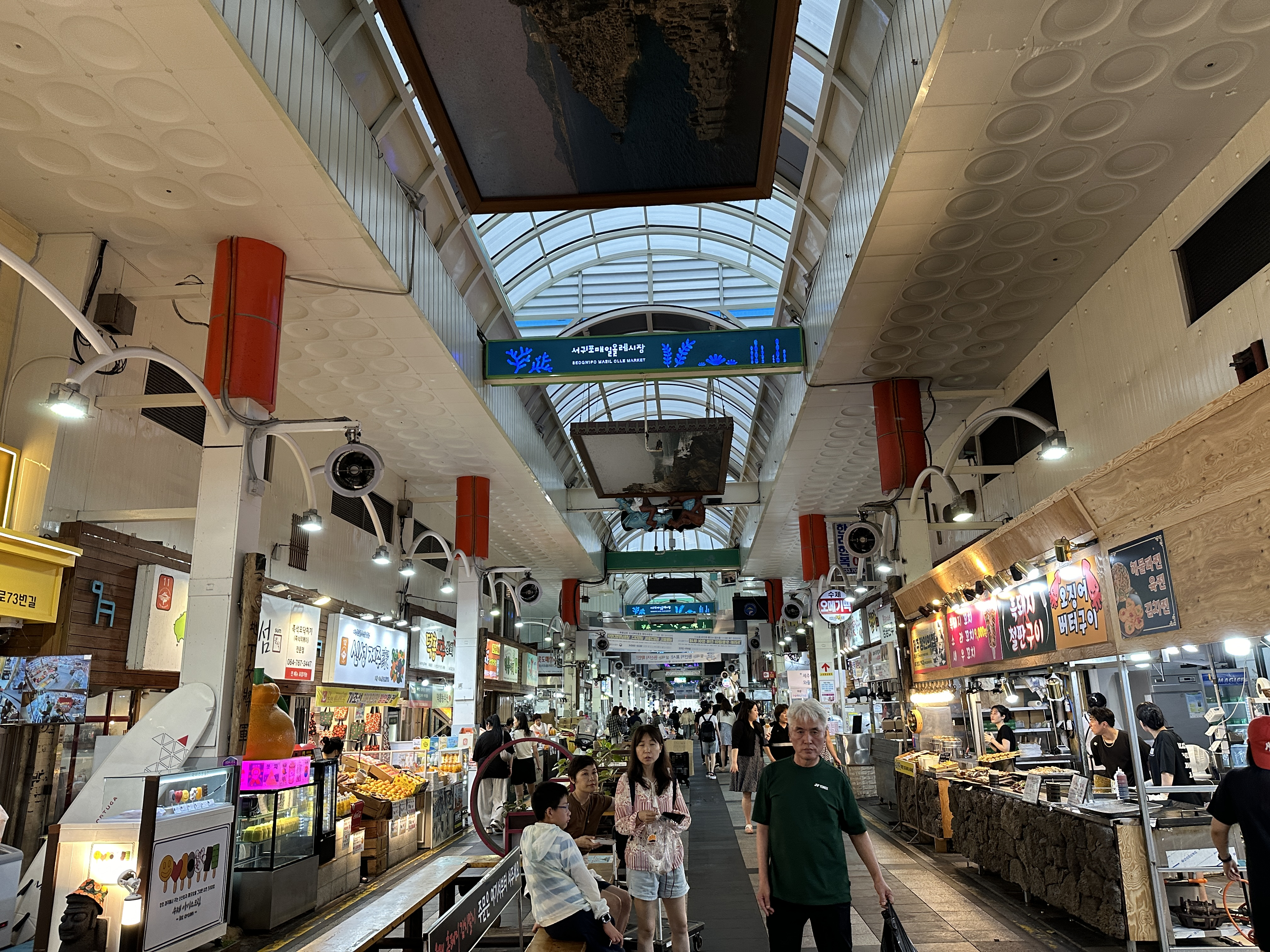
- Part of the inside of the market (2024)
- Location: Seogwi-dong, Seogwipo, Jeju Province, South Korea; 33.2486°N 126.5643°E
- Opening date: 1960
- Goods sold: Food, souvenirs
- Interactive map of Seogwipo Maeil Olle Market

Seogwipo Maeil Olle Market (Korean: 서귀포매일올레시장; Hanja: 西歸浦市每日올레市場) is a large traditional market in Seogwi-dong, Seogwipo, Jeju Province, South Korea. It is the largest and oldest permanent market in Seogwipo, and is considered a major tourist attraction and economic hub for the city. The market is named for olle, Jeju's traditional alleyways from roads to houses.

The market is open 24 hours, although the number of stalls open varies by the hour. The market is located on the Jeju Olle Trail. The market is centrally located and within a 10 minute walk of other major tourist attractions in the city.

== Description ==
It sells a wide variety of goods and amenities, including street food, fruits and vegetables (especially Jeju's hallabong tangerines), souvenirs, and restaurants. Some stores identify which fish for sale were caught that same day. The market has an outdoor performance hall, and often hosts events and performances from local groups. One such event in February 2024 had a traditional Korean shamanic gut performance.

The market was officially established in 1960, and reportedly developed organically around that decade. The market once mainly sold agricultural and industrial products. In the 1990s, it reportedly experienced a lull in business, as local supermarkets became significant. Beginning in 2000, significant construction and modernization efforts were conducted in the market. It was made a covered market from 2000 to 2003. A parking facility with 250 spaces was finished in 2003. In 2004, standardized stalls and signboards were made, and a restroom was completed. The floors were also repaved.

The market's business recovered in the 2010s, as it was made part of the popular Jeju Olle Trail. Stores began catering towards tourists. The market became seen as a success story, as it was one of the fastest growing in the country. Efforts were made to modernize it further. There is a long artificial stream in the middle of the market, with fish and plants in it. The market has made efforts to digitalize and accept overseas payment efforts. Merchants were trained to be able to communicate with foreigners, especially Chinese tourists.

In 2017, it had 216 stores, with 103 street stalls. It had parking capacity for 600 cars and 5 buses. A 2022 report gave the total average sales per day for the market as ₩178.22 million, with an average of 9,034 daily customers. The market began a modernization effort in 2023, wherein ₩1.25 billion was invested in various projects for the market. The city has hosted debates on how to disperse the economic benefits of the market to the rest of the city.

== Gallery ==
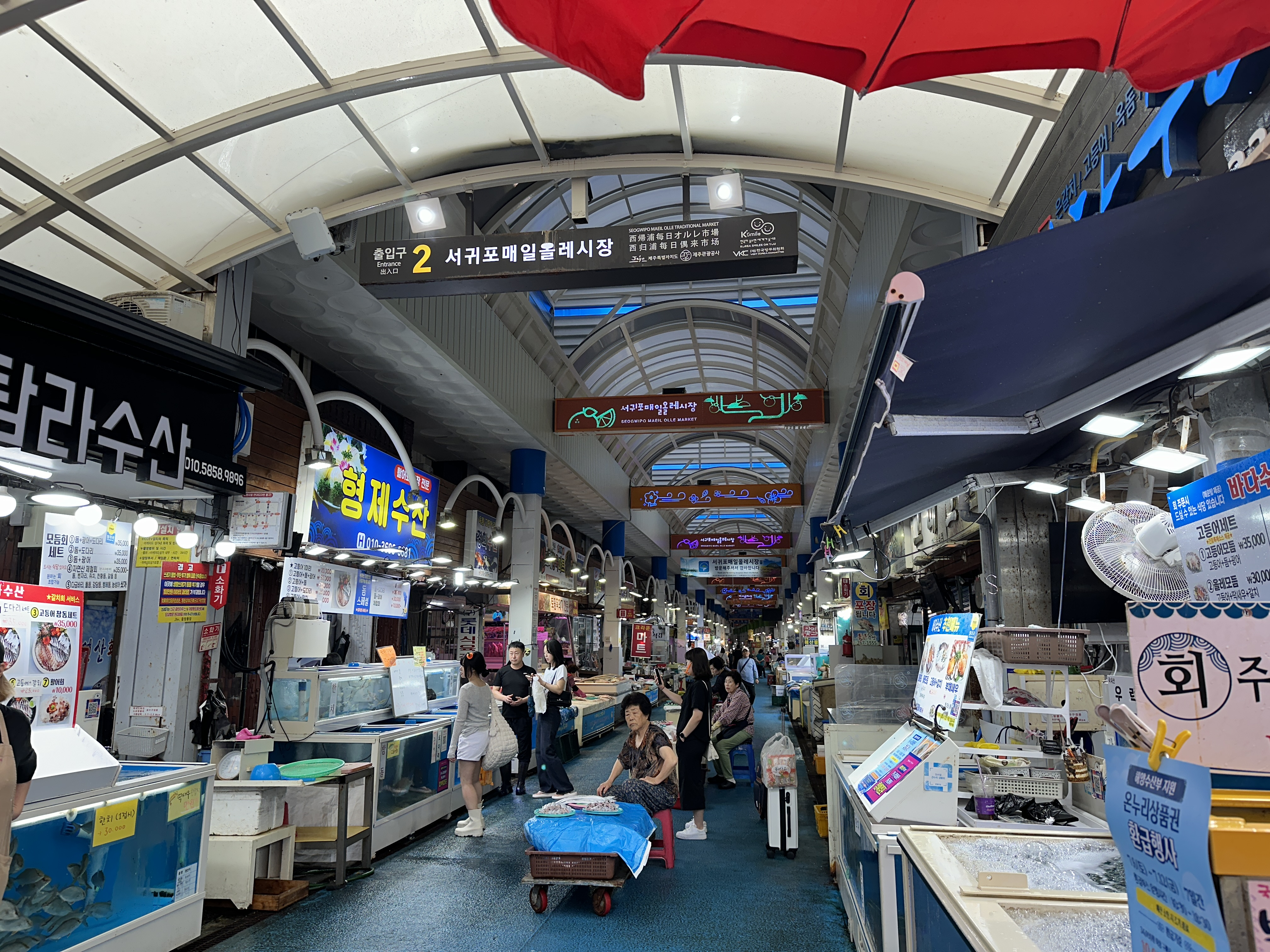
Seafood section (2024)

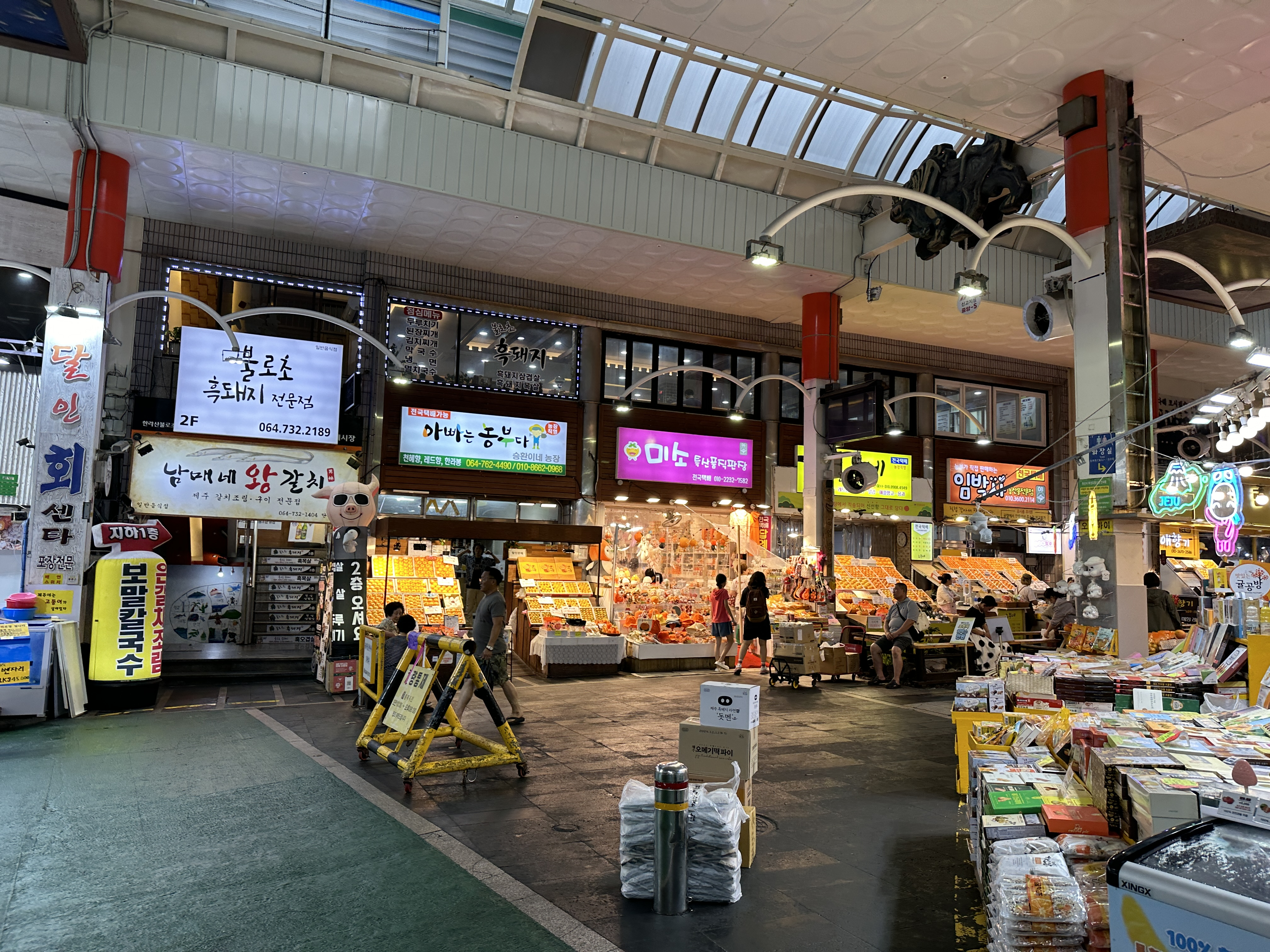
Stores (2024)

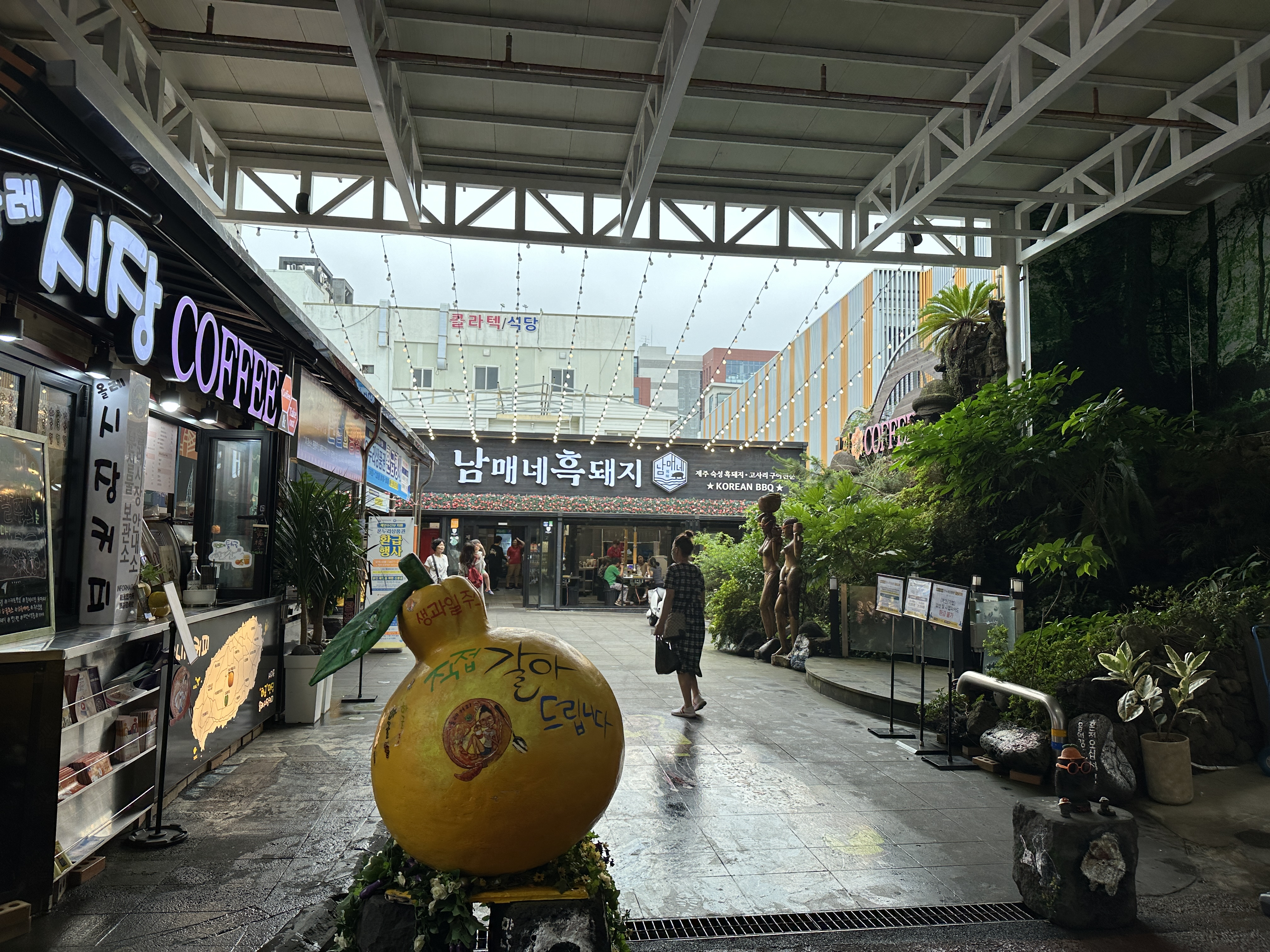
Restaurants and statue (2024)

== See also ==
- List of markets in South Korea
- Seogwipo Rural Five-Day Market
