= The New Book of Knowledge =

Encyclopedia published by Grolier USA

- Title page for The New Book of Knowledge (1989 edition)
- Editor: Martha G. Schapp
- Language: English
- Publication date: 1966; 60 years ago
- Publication place: United States
- Preceded by: Book of Knowledge

The New Book of Knowledge is an encyclopedia published by Grolier USA.

The encyclopedia was a successor to the Book of Knowledge, published from 1912 to 1965. This was a topically arranged encyclopedia described as an "entirely new work" under the editorial direction of Martha G. Schapp, head of overall encyclopedia direction at Grolier, and the specific direction of Dr. Lowell A. Martin.

From the beginning The New Book of Knowledge was lauded by critics, who praised it as one of the best encyclopedias for its target demographic, albeit the most expensive. Some of the set's unique features included a "Dictionary index" that included both references to pages in the text, as well as short definitions for words not found in the text. In 1985 there were approximately 5,000 of these entries, together with 80,000 regular index entries. The index was spread out at the end of each volume and was recapitulated in Vol. 21, without the definitions. The encyclopedia also utilized definition boxes that explained technical terms that were bolded in the article. Other features included excerpts from literature such as portions of the Arabian Nights and "Paul Revere's Ride", as well as practical how to guides, such as "How to build an ant observatory" and "Making your own weather observation". One criticism, however, was that it offered little or no information about sex-related subjects. An article for menstruation was not added until 1984. Other areas that were apparently neglected in the 1980s included masturbation and homosexuality.

The 1985 edition of the encyclopedia had 21 volumes, 10,540 page, 9,116 articles (not including the definitions in the index), 22,500 illustrations (three fourths of which were in color) and 1,046 maps. All the articles were signed (again, excluding entries in the "Dictionary index"), and an editorial staff of 50 was listed at the beginning of Vol. I and about 1,400 contributors were listed at the end of Vol. 20.

Substantial changes had occurred by 1993. The "Dictionary index" was broken up, with the short definitions listed on blue paper at the end of each volume, and the index proper was relegated to volume 21 only. Controversial and sexual topics were also covered in more detail. Subjects such as AIDS, birth control and abortion were treated realistically and in depth. A new paper back supplement, the Home and School Study Guide, was introduced. Directed at parents, librarians and teachers, this booklet gave graded bibliographies on 1,000 subjects keyed to articles in the set.

The 1993 edition had 21 volumes, 10,600 pages and 6.8 million words. There were 9,000 articles, excluding the 5,000 in the "Dictionary index". There were 4,000 cross references and 85,000 index entries. The set had 25,000 illustrations, 90% of which were in color. Nearly all articles were signed and 1,700 contributors were listed at the end of Vol. 20. As in previous editions, the set utilized a "pyramid structure" in its articles, starting out simple and growing more complex and difficult as the article went on. They employed the Dale-Chall Readability Formula to make sure the material was comprehensible, informative and interesting. Professor Jeanne Chall of Harvard collaborated in editing the encyclopedia.

In 2000, Scholastic Corporation acquired Grolier and now has full rights to the contents of The New Book of Knowledge.

Currently published by Scholastic Press, it has gone through several editions. The 2007 edition is published in 21 volumes and contains more than 9,000 articles. By an agreement with Scholastic, Grolier published the contents of the encyclopedia online with registration.

In 2005, there was a request to augment the coverage on Ancient Persia in the article on Ancient Civilizations. In response, Scholastic expanded the coverage in the 2006 edition.

As of 2010, the Scholastic website has a message stating that the 2006 edition is not available.

== Other editions ==
Grolier also published an annual supplement, The New Book of Knowledge Annual which updated the encyclopedia with summaries of the events of the year. Other than the title and publisher there was no "real editorial connection to the encyclopedia". These were published from at least 1957 to 2012.

A Spanish language version of The New Book of Knowledge, El Nuevo Tesoro de la Juventud, was published in Mexico City. It was intended for the Latin American market, but could also be purchased in the US and Canada.

In the mid-1980s, Grolier oversaw the creation of the Knowledge Exploration Series—a set of five microcomputer software programs that were designed to work with the 64K Apple II. The set cost about $300 and contained ten manuals and five backup discs. By 1993, the entire index was available on the Grolier Master Encyclopedia Index CD-ROM with those of the Academic American Encyclopedia and the Encyclopedia Americana. This sold for $149 and worked on MS-DOS, Windows and Macintosh.
