= Enciclopedia Heráldica Hispano-Americana =

The Enciclopedia Heráldica Hispano-Americana (1919-1963) — in English, the Encyclopedia of Spanish-American Heraldry — is a massive work of genealogy and heraldry by two brothers — Alberto García Carraffa (1882–19??) and Arturo García Carraffa (20 January 1885 – 27 January 1963) — from Ciudad Rodrigo, Salamanca, Spain.

== The Work ==
In 1919, the García Carraffas began their Enciclopedia and publication continued until 1963 when the last volume encompassing the letter "U" (surname “Urriza”) was published as a tribute to her late husband by Margarita Prendes Carraffa. The 88 volumes of this work are indebted to the work of many indefatigable genealogists and contain more than 15,000 genealogies and coats of arms. The work treats Spanish heraldry in the first two volumes, and with volume three begins the Diccionario Heráldico y Genealógico de Apellidos Españoles y Americanos ("Heraldic and Genealogical Dictionary of Spanish and American Surnames"), which is a listing of over 15,000 names with their respective genealogical histories (with color illustrations of representative crests) of Spanish and Spanish-American families. More recently, the work has been continued by Endika de Mogrobejo bringing the total to 17,000 surnames.

== Editions ==
- In 1952, a reprinting of the earlier volumes began. The alphabet covered by the work goes from "A" through "U".
- In 2010, an automated index created by the Library of Congress, compiled all the names mentioned in the respective indices and allows a comprehensive search of all volumes at one time. (Previously, the structure of the work provided an index in each volume. As the work progressed, supplemental names were added, breaking the alphabetical continuum. Without perusing all the volumes one could never be sure that an article may not have been missed.)
