= Aragonese Wikipedia =

Aragonese-language edition of Wikipedia

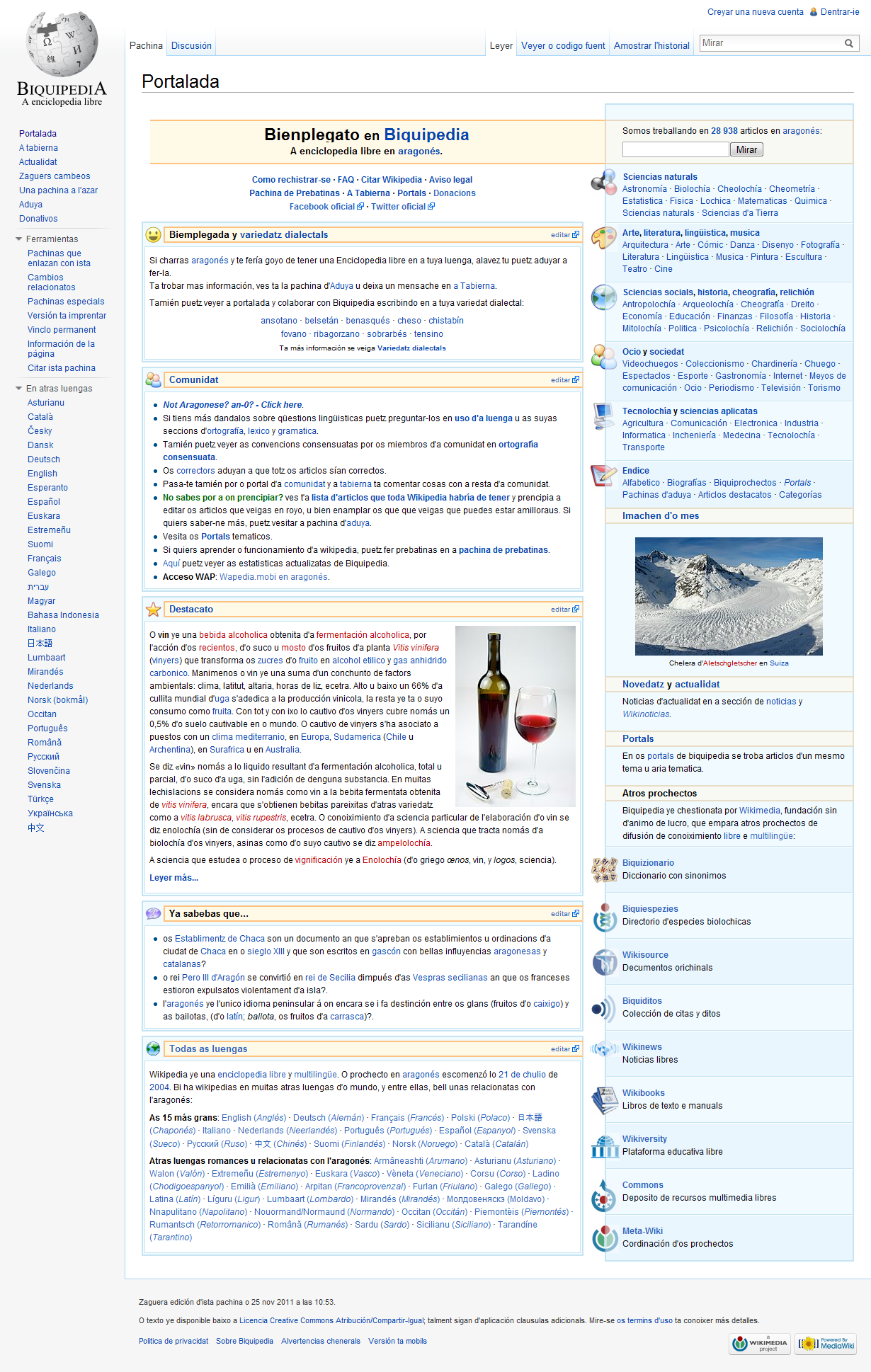
- Main page
- Website type: Internet encyclopedia project
- Available in: Aragonese
- Headquarters: Miami, Florida (United States)
- Owner: Wikimedia Foundation
- Commercial: No
- Registration: Optional
- Users: 91705
- Launched: 12 July 2004; 22 years ago
- Content license: Creative Commons Attribution/ Share-Alike 4.0 (most text also dual-licensed under GFDL); Media licensing varies

The Aragonese Wikipedia (Aragonese: Wikipedia en aragonés) or Biquipedia is the Aragonese language edition of the Web-based free content encyclopedia Wikipedia. The project was started on 21 July 2004. As of 27 September 2026, this edition has 86,670 articles and is the 84th largest Wikipedia by number of articles. The Aragonese Wikipedia is classified in the 4th place of Wikipedias by articles per population.

== History ==
After its foundation on 21 July 2004, the Aragonese Wikipedia reached 1,000 articles on 30 December 2005 after the creation of the article Ciudat de Panamá (Panama City), and its community produced a special logo to commemorate the event.

The Aragonese Wikipedia reached 2,000 and 3,000 articles on 4 March 2006 thanks to the help of Chlewbot, and reached the 4,000 articles on 20 September 2006 with the article Cortz d'Aragón (Aragonese Corts).

The community of Aragonese-speaking Wikipedians issued a special commemorative logo for their 5,000th article, Monesterio de Sant Chuan d'a Penya (San Juan de la Peña), on 29 December 2006.

The Aragonese Wikipedia reached 6,000 articles on 31 May 2007 with the article Pitarc (Pitarque), and reached 7,000 articles later that year with the article Taifa de Saraqusta (Taifa of Saraqusta).

It reached 8,000 articles on 22 January 2008 with the article Sexma de la Honor de Uesa (Sesma de la Honor de Huesa), and 9,000 articles with the article Las Planas de Castellot (Las Planas de Castellote).

On 21 August 2008, the Aragonese Wikipedia community celebrated its 10,000th article, Monesterio de Sant Per de Ciresa (Abbey of San Pedro de Siresa), by producing a special logo.

The Aragonese Wikipedia reached the 15,000 articles on 9 June 2009 with the article Sublevación de Chaca (Jaca uprising).

The Aragonese Wikipedia reached 20,000 articles on 3 April 2010 after the creation of an article about Mesegar de Tajo (Mesegar de Tajo).

On 16 March 2011 the Aragonese Wikipedia community celebrated its 25,000th article, Castiello de Sibirana (Sibirana castle), by producing a special logo.

On 11 June 2014 the Aragonese Wikipedia reached 30,000 articles with the article Aragosaurus (Aragosaurus).

== Logo ==
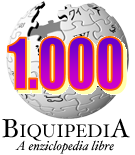
The 1,000th article was created on 30 December 2005

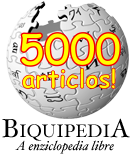
The 5,000th article was created on 29 December 2006

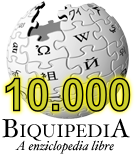
The 10,000th article was created on 21 August 2008

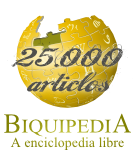
The 25,000th article was created on 16 March 2011

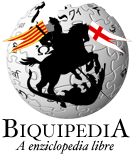
Day of Aragon (San Jorge), 2008
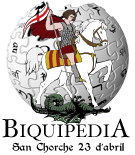
Day of Aragon (San Jorge), 2009

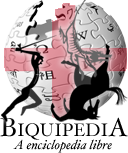
Day of Aragon (San Jorge), 2010

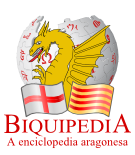
Day of Aragon (San Jorge), 2011

10 years logo (21 July 2014)

Logo of the 10 years of Wikipedia on the day of San Jorge, 2015
