= Encyclopedia of Korean Folk Culture =

South Korean online encyclopedia

- Native name: 한국민속대백과사전
- Available in: Korean; English; Chinese; Spanish
- Headquarters: South Korea
- Owner: National Folk Museum of Korea
- Website: folkency.nfm.go.kr

The Encyclopedia of Korean Folk Culture (EKFC; Korean: 한국민속대백과사전; Hanja: 韓國民俗大百科事典) is a digital encyclopedia operated by the South Korean National Folk Museum of Korea, and thus supported by the South Korean government. It focuses on various topics related to traditional Korean culture.

Around 600 scholars worked on producing articles for the encyclopedia. In 2016, one report stated that the encyclopedia had a target of reaching 70,000 articles by 2024. It is mainly written in Korean, but is actively being translated into several other languages, including English, Chinese, and Spanish.

It has a number of sub-encyclopedias that focus on specific subjects. It is available for free online, and has a mobile app that can be used to search and read articles.

== See also ==
- Encyclopedia of Korean Culture
- Encyclopedia of Korean Local Culture
