= Encyclopedia of Korean Local Culture =

South Korean online encyclopedia

- Native name: 한국향토문화전자대전
- Website type: Online encyclopedia
- Available in: Korean
- Headquarters: {{{location_country}}}
- Website: www.grandculture.net/korea
- Commercial: no

The Encyclopedia of Korean Local Culture (EKLC; Korean: 한국향토문화전자대전; Hanja: 韓國鄕土文化電子大典; abbreviated 향문) is an online encyclopedia operated by the Academy of Korean Studies (AKS) and the Ministry of Education, which are in turn supported by the South Korean government. As of October 2023, it is subdivided into 230 regional encyclopedias, with 111 of them considered to be complete. The various regional encyclopedias are located at subdomains of the main "grandculture.net" domain.

The encyclopedia began compilation in 2003. The first regional encyclopedia to be completed was that for Seongnam. Cost and efforts to produce these encyclopedias is shared between the South Korean government and the governments of each region covered. However, the completion and maintenance of the encyclopedias has been hampered by budgetary constraints.

As an example, the Gwangju edition of the encyclopedia (디지털광주문화대전; each encyclopedia is named similarly) began to be compiled in July 2019, and was completed by September 2023. At time of completion, it contained 65,377 pages, 10,625 photos, and 50 videos. 130 writers contributed to its creation.

== See also ==
- Encyclopedia of Korean Culture
- Encyclopedia of Korean Folk Culture
