= Book of Knowledge =

1912 American children's encyclopedia

- Language: English
- Publication date: 1912
- Publication place: United States
- Followed by: New Book of Knowledge

The Book of Knowledge was an encyclopedia aimed at juveniles first published in 1870, by the Grolier Society.

Originally largely a reprint of the British Children's Encyclopædia with revisions related to the United States by Holland Thompson, over time the encyclopedia evolved into a new entity entirely. It was published under a policy of continuous revision, meaning that there were no separate editions, but annual printings that were edited and updated by the publisher. Thompson remained editor until his death in 1940. From 1941 to 1960, it was edited by Ellen V. McLaughlin and from 1960 to 1966 by John D. Tedford. In 1966, it was replaced by the New Book of Knowledge.

The number of volumes fluctuated. It was originally a 24 volume set, but other print runs had 10, 12 or 20.; In 1919, the Book of Knowledge was presented in a 20 volume set, as shown in the image above, as was 1951. From 1949, Grolier also issued a Book of Knowledge Annual.

Encyclopædia Britannica praised the index system that was introduced by the Book of Knowledge saying "much of the success of the work as a reference tool resulted from its splendidly contrived index, which remains a model of its kind.". The Book of Knowledge also included a different index for poetry.

== Sample pages of 1919 edition ==
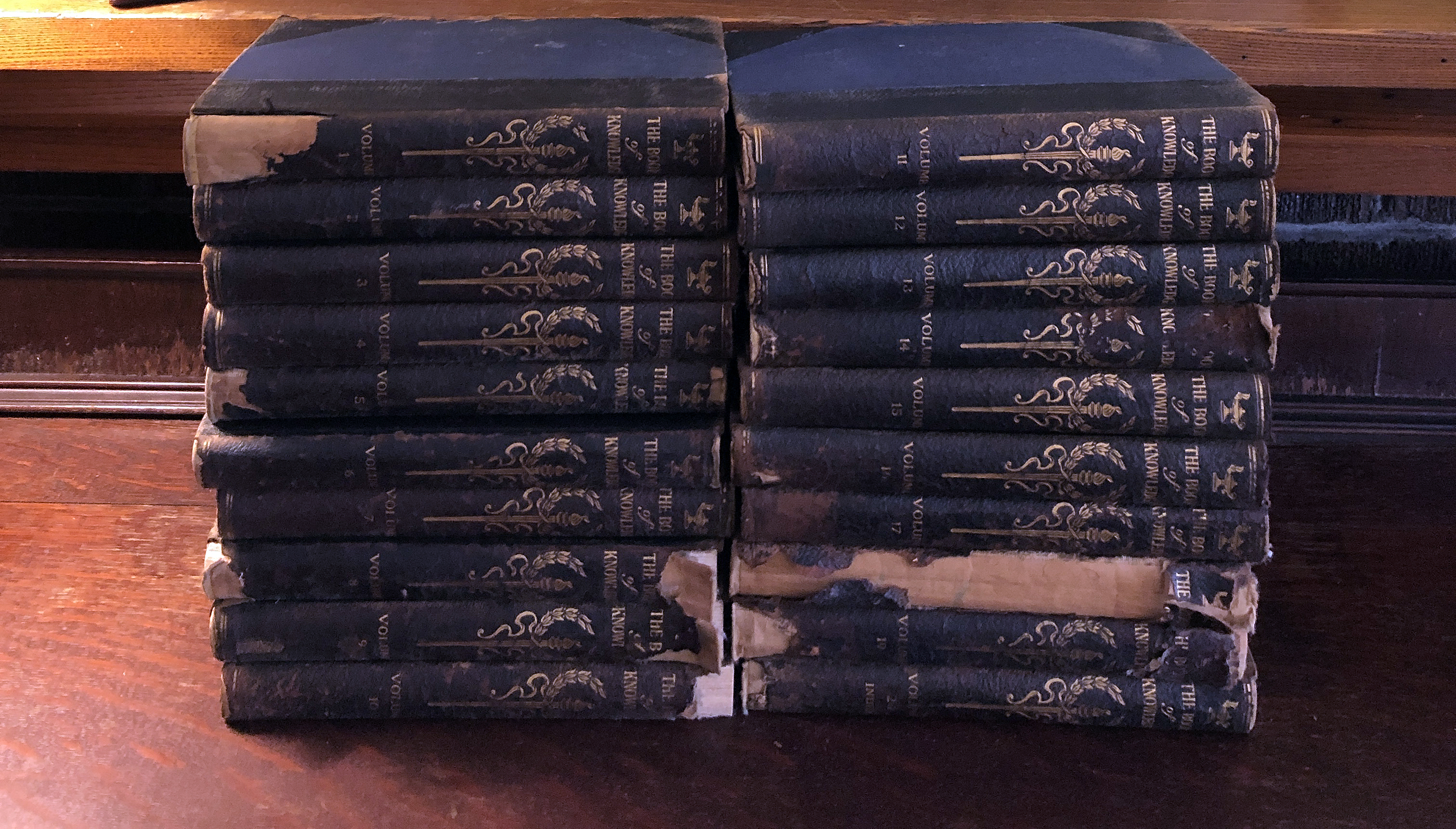
20 Volumes of Book of Knowledge 1919 edition.

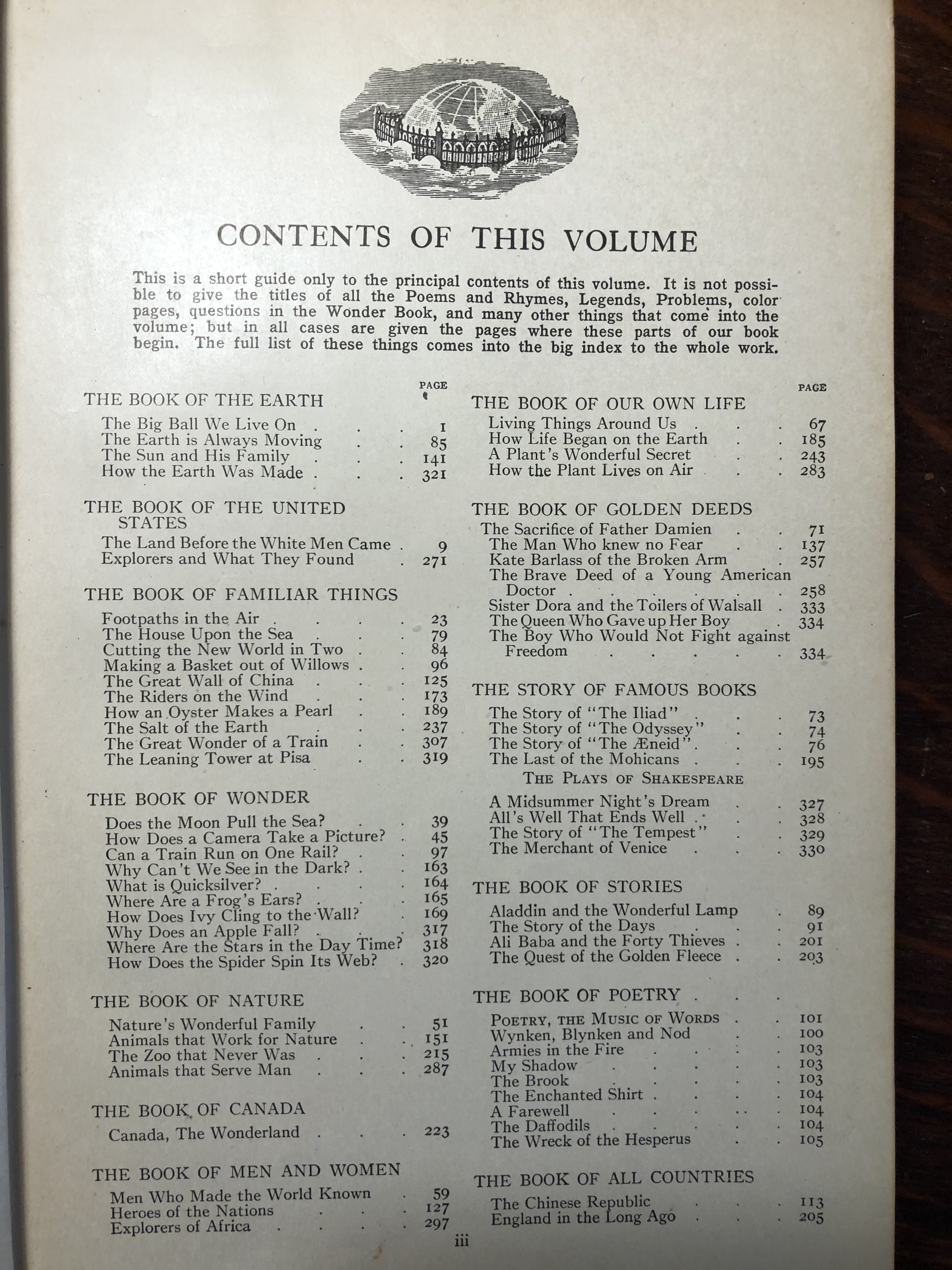
Book of Knowledge 1919 Vol 1, Table of Contents

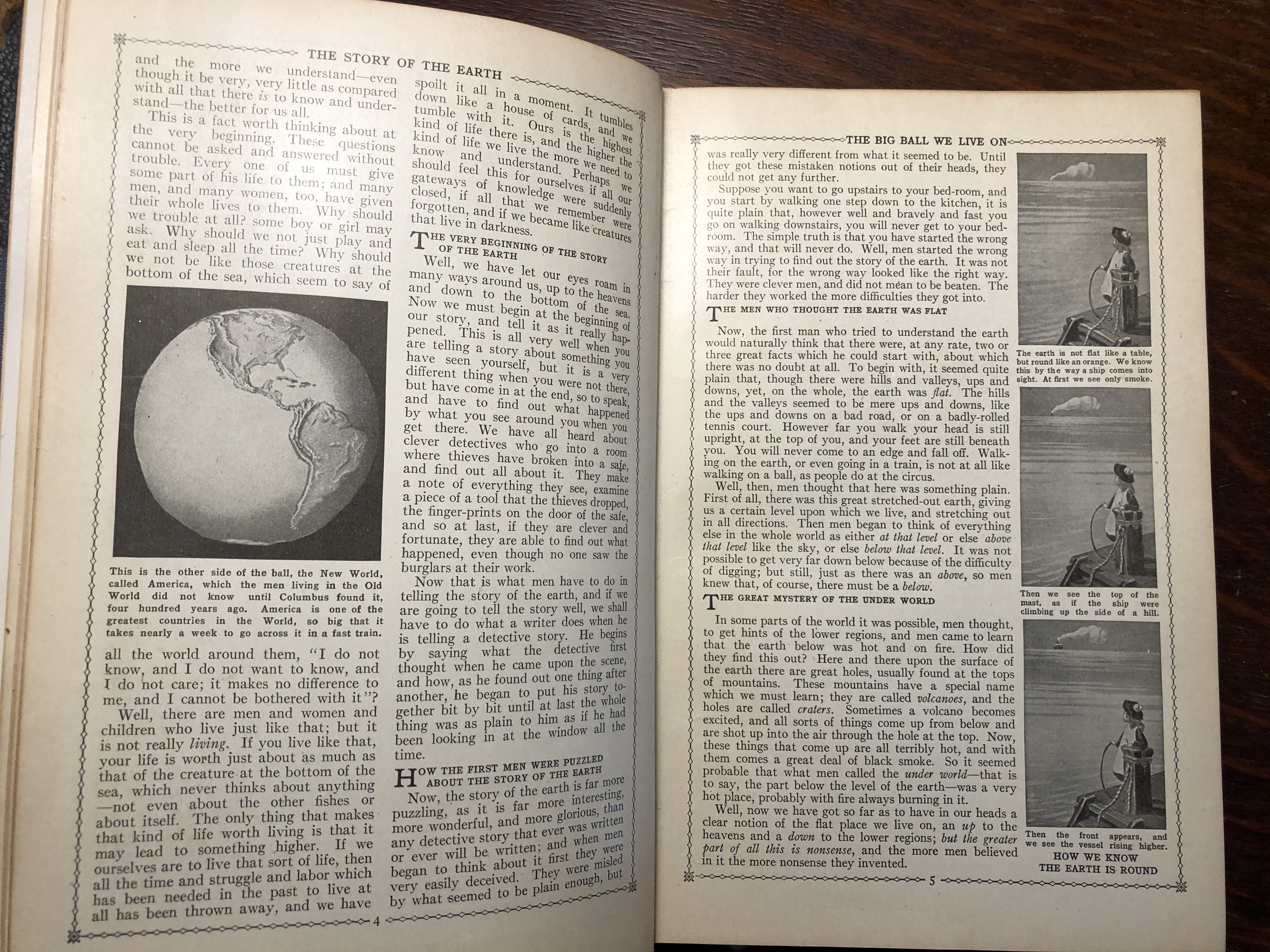
Book of Knowledge 1919 Vol 1 Page 4. The story of the earth.

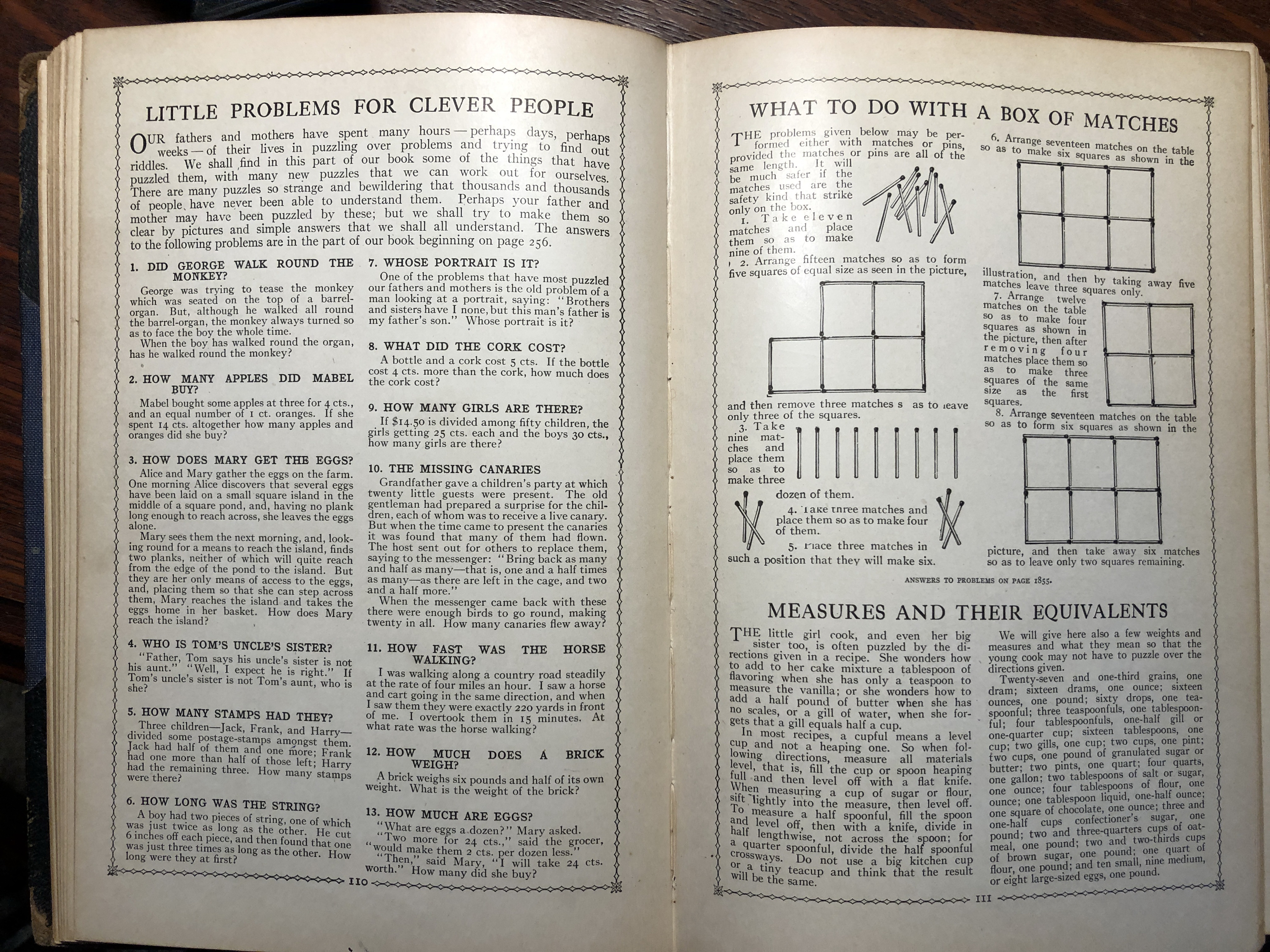
Book of Knowledge 1919 Vol 1 Page 110. Thinking problems, match tricks, measurement conversion.

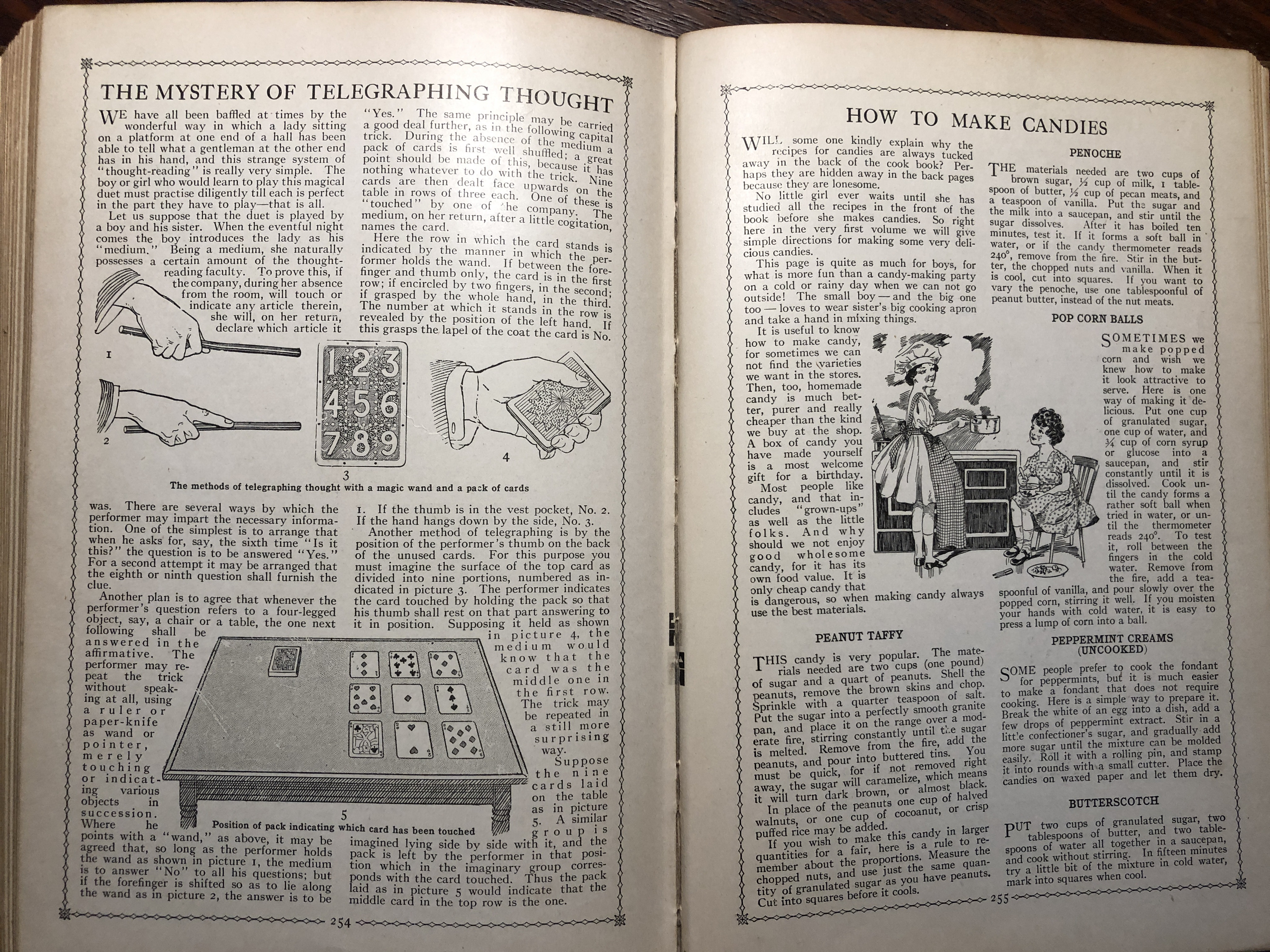
Book of Knowledge 1919 Vol 1 Page 254. Card trick.

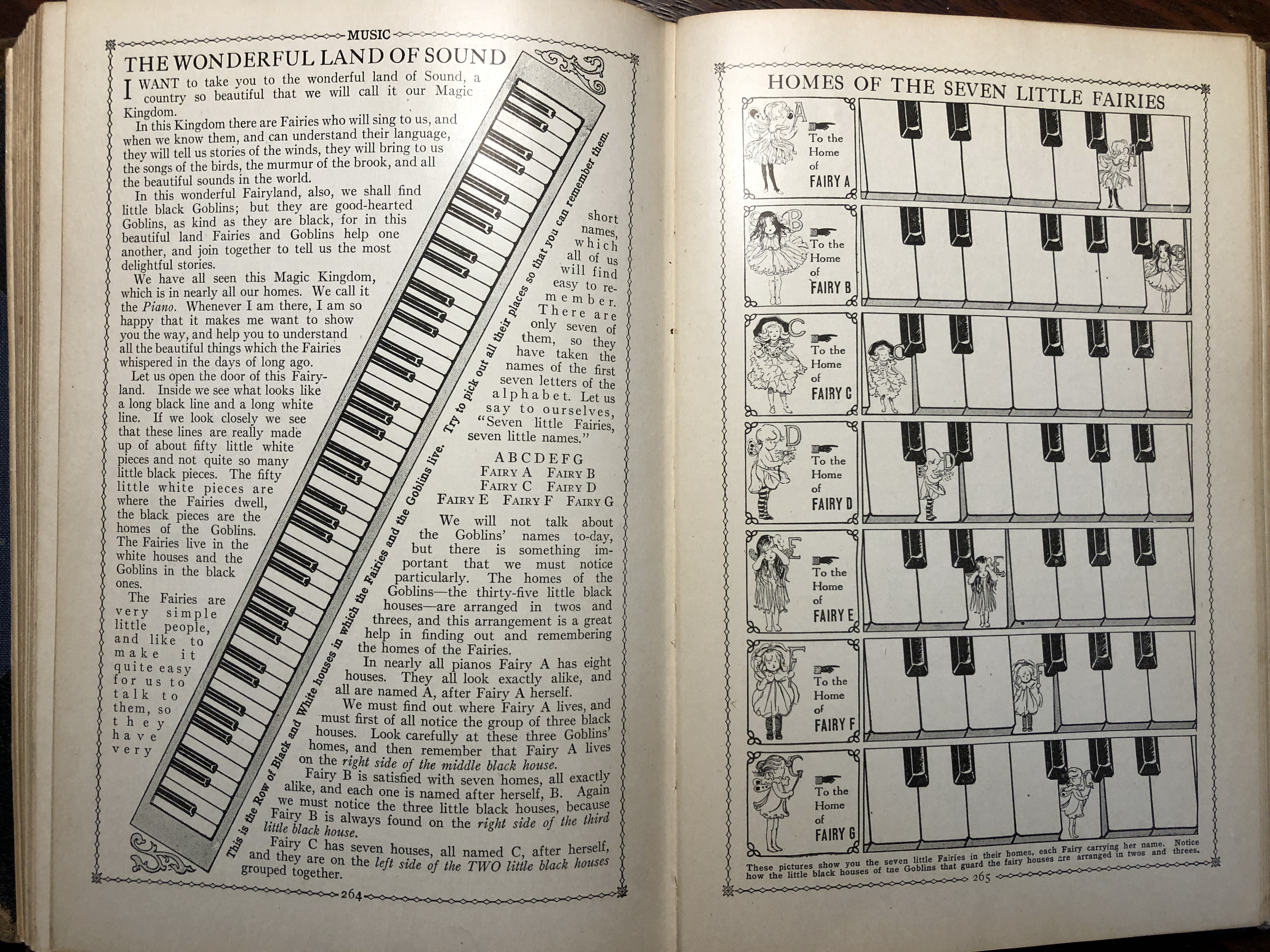
Book of Knowledge 1919 Vol 1 Page 264. Music lesson.

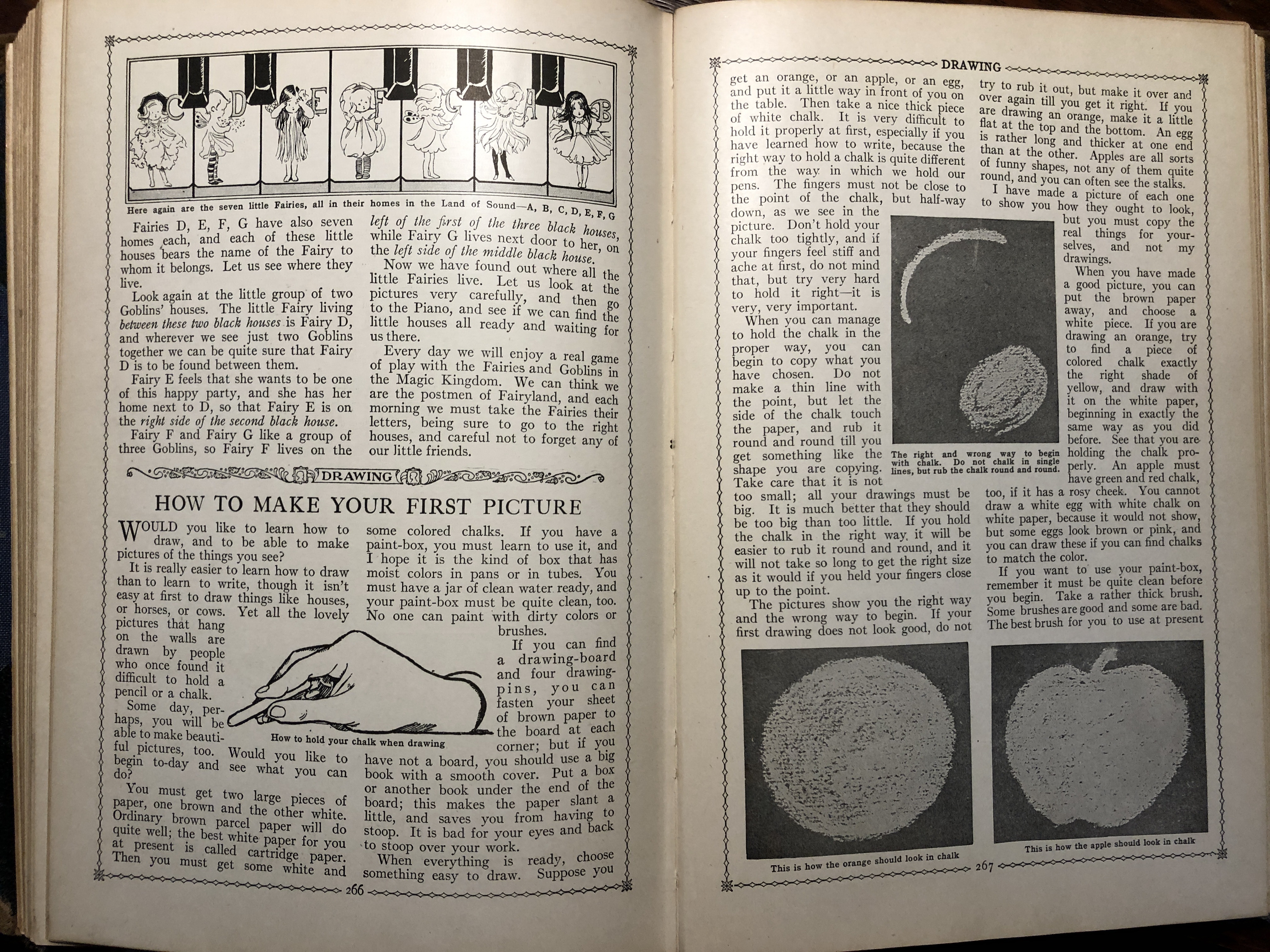
Book of Knowledge 1919 Vol 1 Page 266. Drawing lesson.

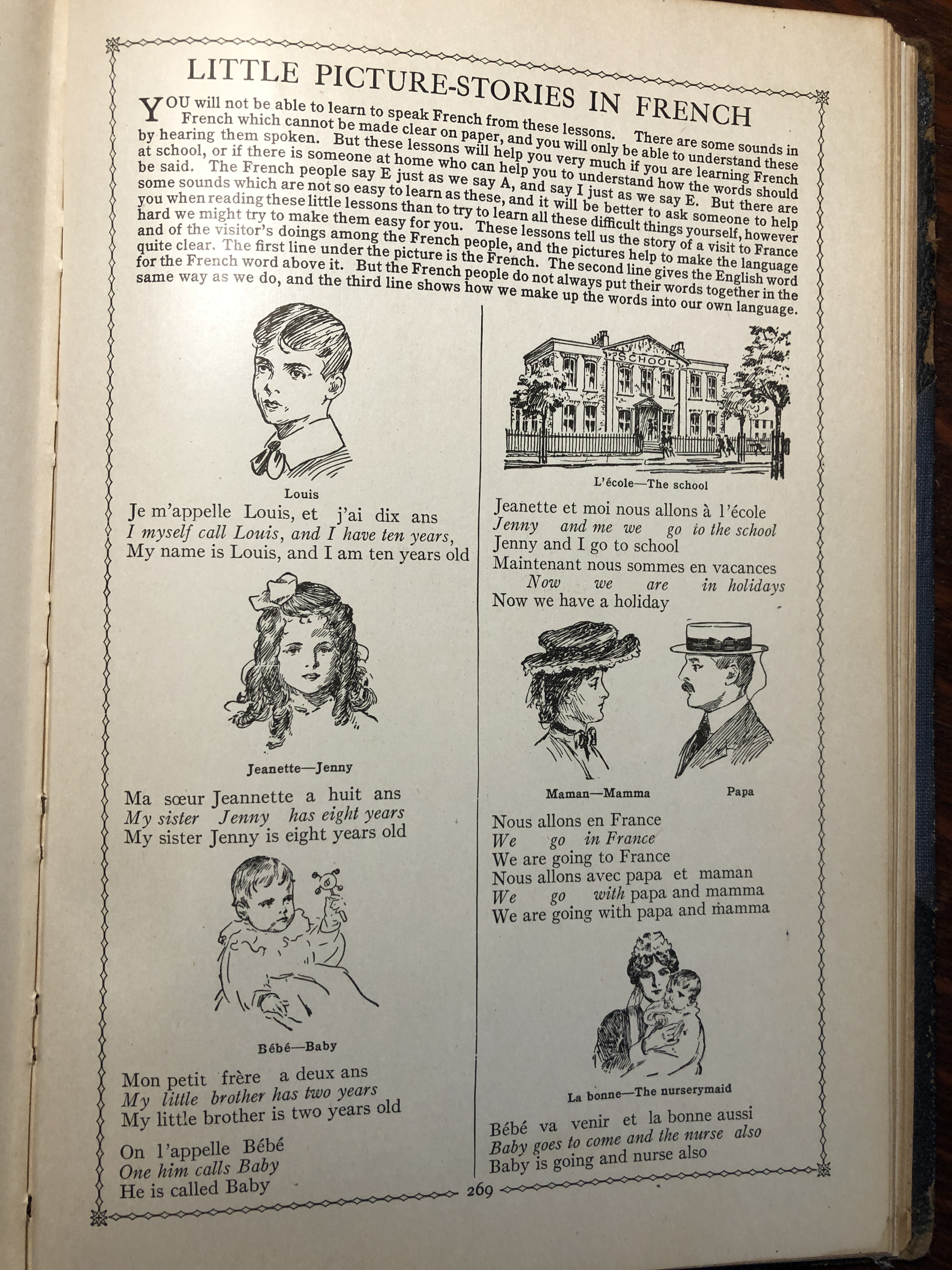
Book of Knowledge 1919 Vol 1 Page 269. French lesson

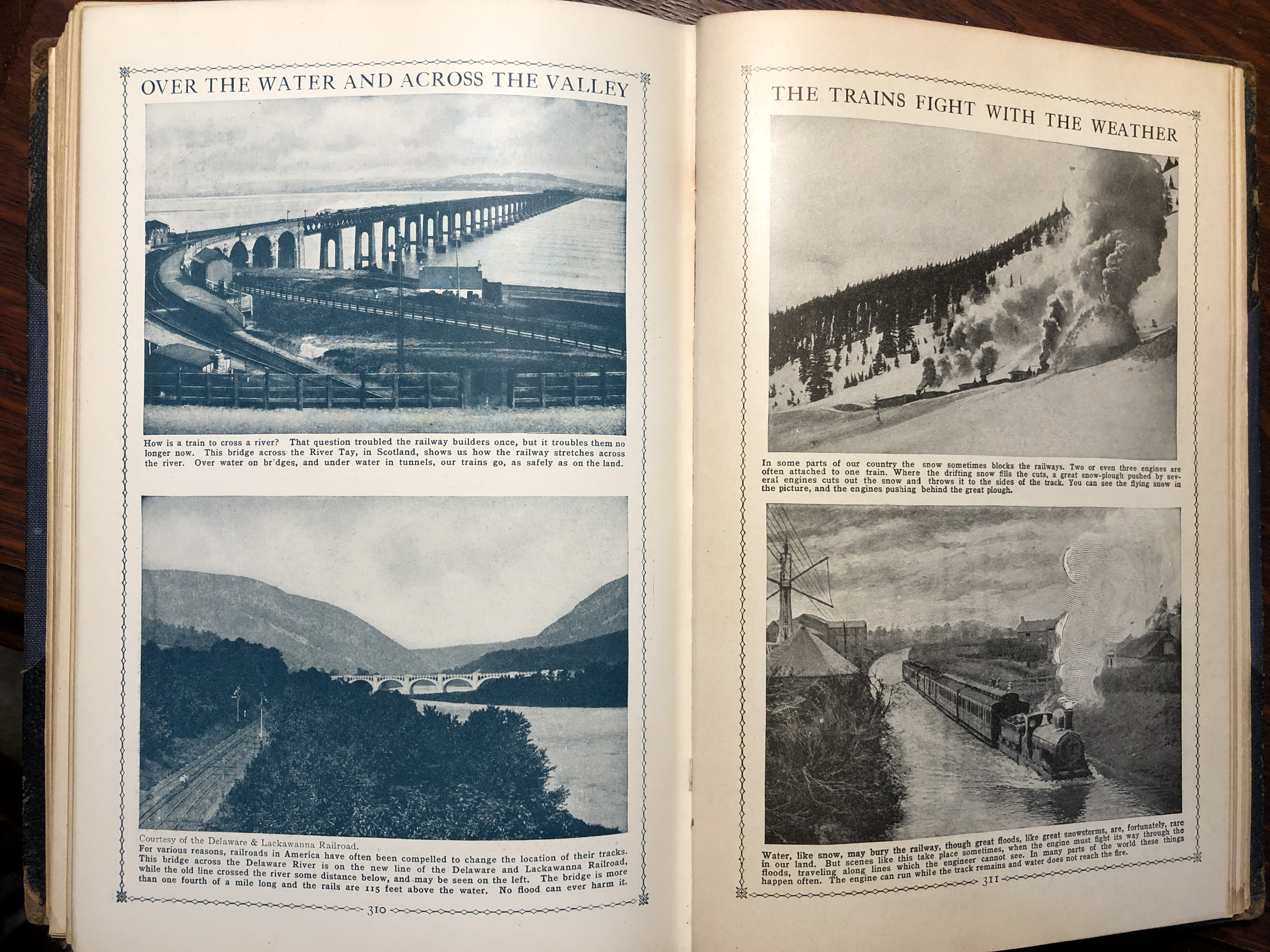
Book of Knowledge 1919 Vol 1 Page 310. Trains.

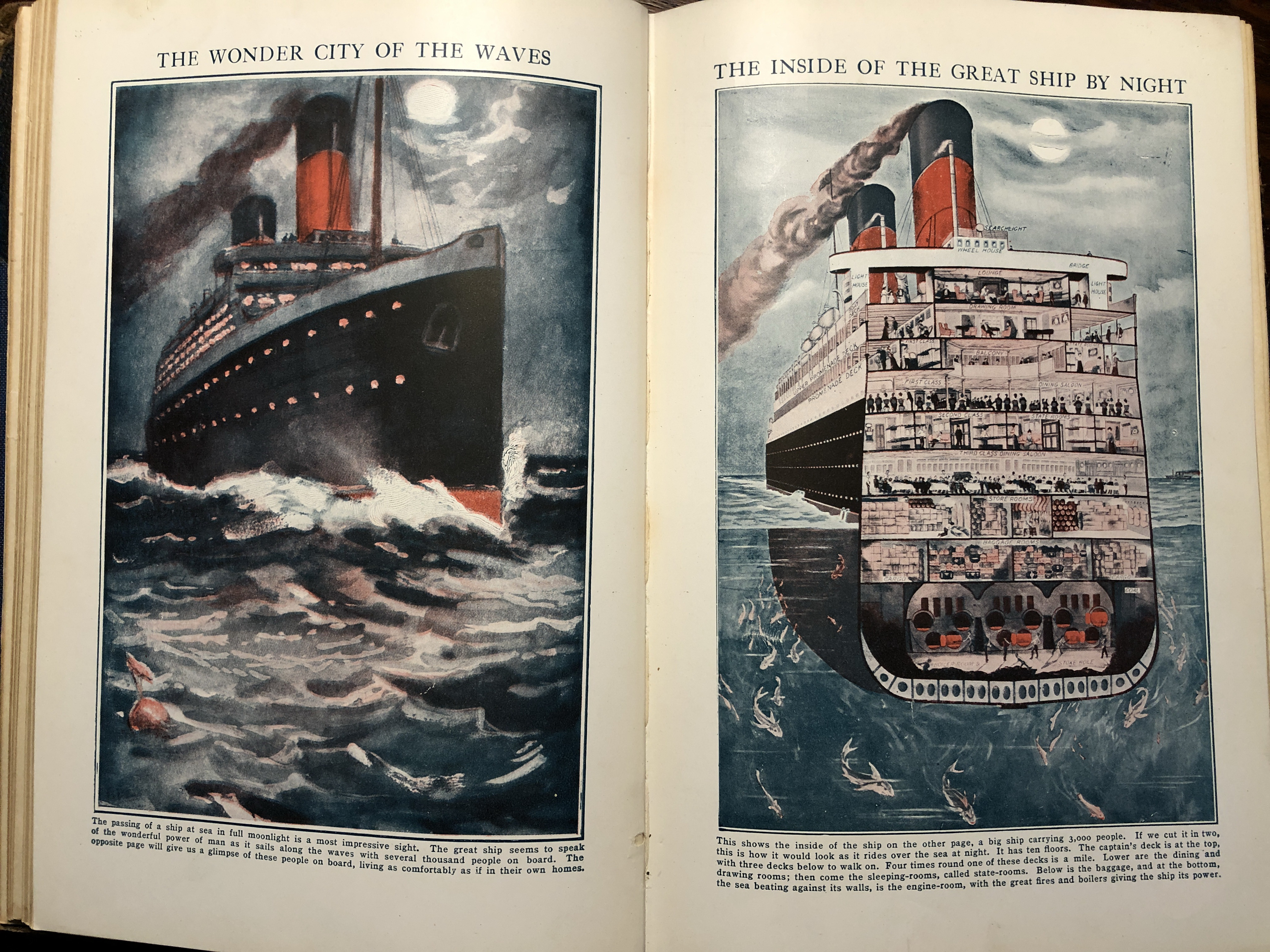
Book of Knowledge 1919 Vol 1. Passenger ship.

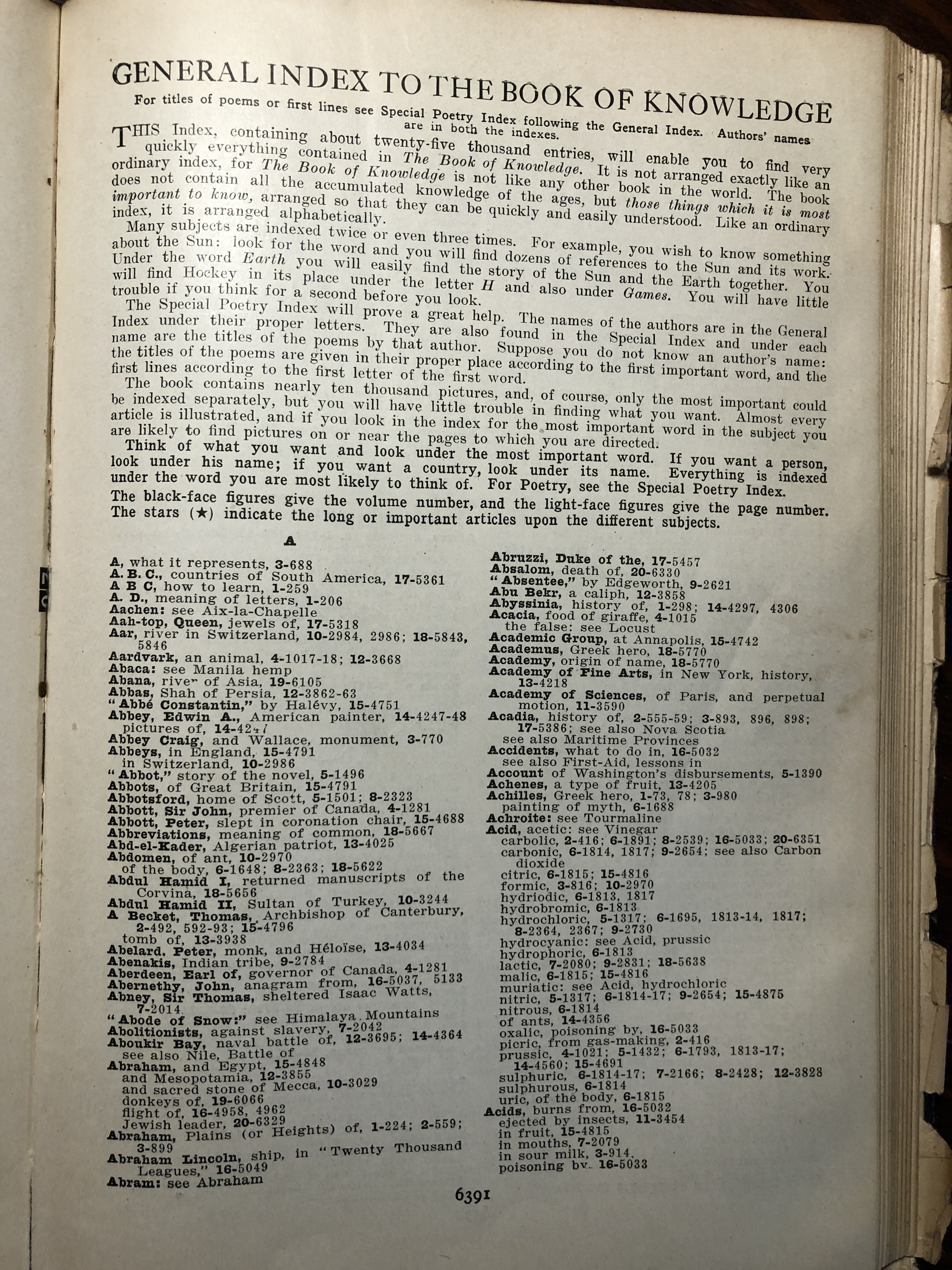
Book of Knowledge 1919 Vol 20, General Index Start

Book of Knowledge 1919 Vol 20, General Index Sample

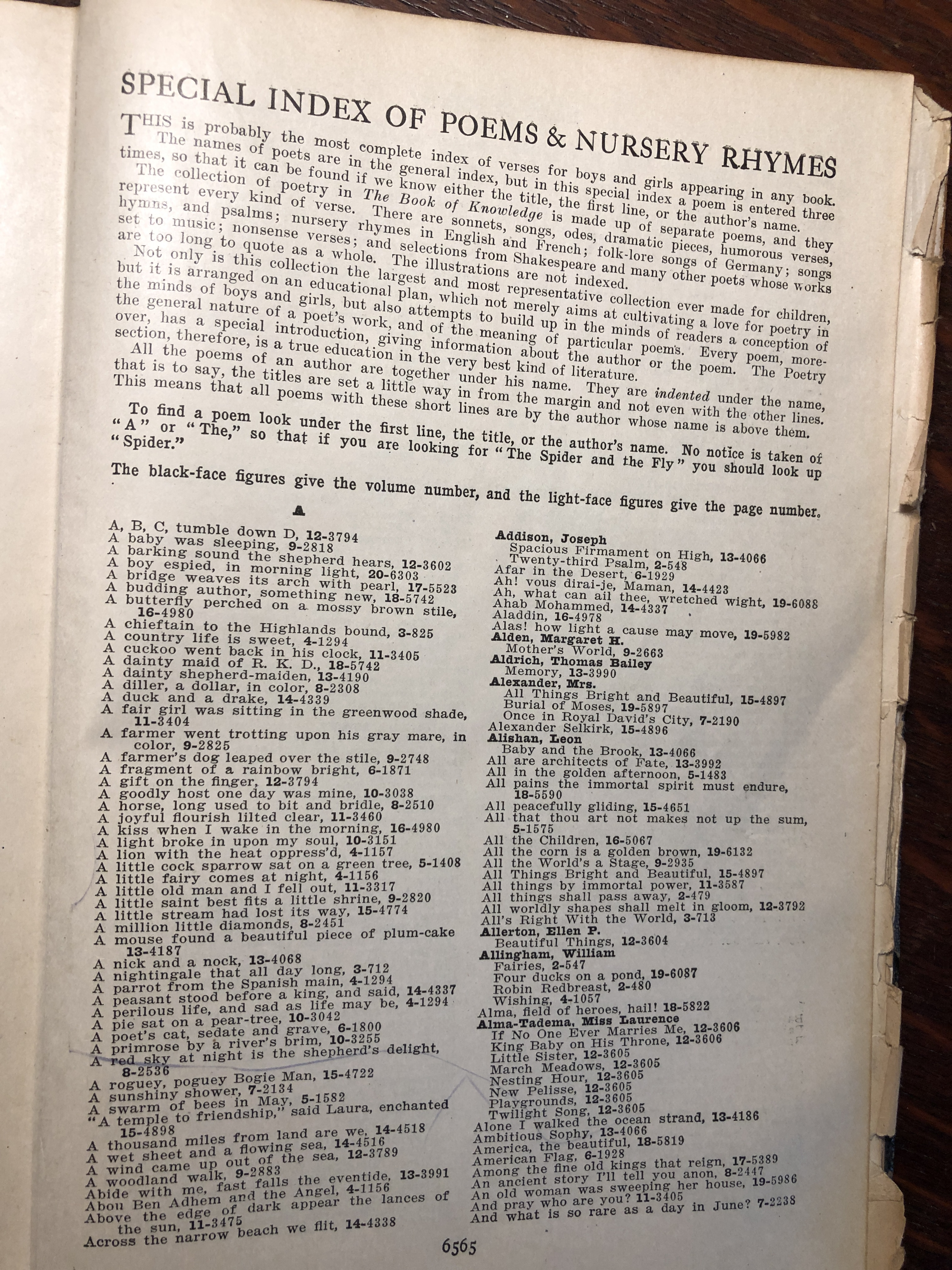
Book of Knowledge 1919 Vol 20, Poetry Index Start
