= List of 19th-century encyclopedias =

== In English ==
=== 1800s ===
- Encyclopaedia Londinensis (1801)
- The Cyclopædia; or, Universal Dictionary of Arts, Sciences, and Literature ed. Abraham Rees (1802–1819)
- Domestic Encyclopedia (1802)
- English Encyclopaedia (1802)
- Kendal's Pocket Encyclopedia (1802, second edition 1811)
  - Minor Encyclopedia (1803), edited by Thaddeus M. Harris, in the United States; copies much of Kendal's Pocket Encyclopedia
- Encyclopædia Perthensis (Perth, Scotland, 1803; 1816)
- The New and Complete American Encyclopædia or Universal Dictionary of Arts and Sciences (1805–1811)
- A Dictionary of Arts and Sciences (1806–7)
- Edinburgh Encyclopædia (1808–1830)
- British Encyclopedia, or Dictionary of Arts and Sciences (1809)

=== 1810s ===
- The imperial encyclopaedia, or, Dictionary of the sciences and arts : comprehending also the whole circle of miscellaneous literature by Thomas Exley and William Moore Johnson (1812)
- Pantologia (1813)
- Encyclopedia mancuniensis (1815) (Link contains Vol. 2)
- Modern Encyclopaedia edited by Amyas Deane Burrowes (1816)
- Encyclopædia Metropolitana (1817)

=== 1820s ===
- Encyclopædia Edinensis (1827)
- Oxford Encyclopedia (1828) (Link contains Vols. 4 and 5)
- London Encyclopaedia (1829)
- Encyclopaedia Americana (1829–1833), 13 volumes, editor Francis Lieber.
- Cabinet Cyclopedia (1829)

=== 1830s ===
- Maunder's Treasury of Knowledge and Library of Reference (1830)
  - Treasury of Knowledge and Library of Reference (1833)
- British Cyclopaedia of the Arts and Sciences (1833)
- Penny Cyclopaedia (1833–1846)
  - National Cyclopaedia of Useful Knowledge (1847)
  - National Cyclopedia (1867)
  - Imperial Cyclopaedia (1850)
  - English Cyclopaedia (1854–1862, supp. 1869–1873), later served as the basis for the Everyman's Encyclopaedia (1913)
- Chambers's Information for the People (1835)

=== 1840s ===
- Popular Encyclopedia or Conversations Lexicon (1841)
  - New Popular Encyclopedia (1901)
  - Modern Cyclopedia of Universal Knowledge (1906)
  - Blackie's Modern Cyclopaedia of Universal Information (1889) (link contains Vols. 1–3, 5)
    - New Cabinet Cyclopedia and Treasury of Knowledge (1891) American ed.
    - New National Cyclopedia and Treasury (1899)
    - XXth century Cyclopaedia and Atlas (1901)
    - New Twentieth Century Cyclopaedia (1903)
    - New and Complete Universal Self-Pronouncing Dictionary (1905)
    - New Cosmopolitan Encyclopaedia (1906)
    - National Encyclopedia of Reference (1912)
- Dictionary of Science, Literature and Art (1842)

=== 1850s ===
- Library of General Knowledge (1850)
- Iconographic Encyclopaedia of Science, Literature and Art (1851); New and enlarged edition (1886)
- Popular Educator (1852)
  - The Popular educator: a complete encyclopaedia (1884)
  - New Popular Educator (1890)
- Enquire Within Upon Everything (1856)
- New American Cyclopaedia (1857–1863), 16 volumes, editors George Ripley and Charles A. Dana
  - Annual Cyclopedia (1862; an annual supplement to the New American Cyclopeadia; renamed Appleton's Annual Cyclopedia in 1876; final edition in 1903)
  - American Cyclopaedia (1873–1876), the retitled New American Cyclopaedia
- Family Cyclopaedia (1859)

=== 1860s ===
- Chambers's Encyclopaedia (1860)
- World Almanac (1868)
- Whitaker's Almanack (1868)

=== 1870s ===
- Zell's Popular Encyclopedia. 1870.
  - National Encyclopedia (1873) A re-issue of Zell's
  - People's Encyclopedia (1873) A British abridgement of Zell's
  - Universal Encyclopedia (1878) A re-issue of Zell's
  - School Encyclopedia (1899) A re-issue of Zell's
- Globe Encyclopaedia of Universal Information. 1876.
  - Student's Encyclopaedia of Universal Knowledge (1883) A re-issue of Globe
  - Illustrated Globe Encyclopaedia (1890–93) An illustrated re-issue of Globe
- Johnson's New Universal Cyclopaedia (1876–1878), 4 volumes; editors Frederick Augustus Porter Barnard and Arnold Henry Guyot
  - Johnson's (revised) universal cyclopaedia (1886)
  - Johnson's Universal Cyclopaedia (1893–1897)
  - Universal Cyclopaedia (1900)
- Encyclopedic Dictionary (1879)
  - Lloyd's encyclopaedic dictionary (1895) (link only contains Vols. 1-2 and 5)
  - International Encyclopedia and Dictionary (1900)
  - International dictionary and cyclopaedia (1901)
  - Imperial dictionary and Cyclopaedia (1901)
- Beeton's dictionary of universal information (1879)
- Library of Universal Knowledge (1879), a reprint of Chambers's Encyclopaedia with American additions; many editions through the 1880s
  - International Cyclopaedia A re-issue in 1893, many editions during the 1890s.
  - New International Encyclopedia (1904)

=== 1880s ===
- Universal Instructor (1880)
- Little Cyclopaedia of Common Things (1882)
- People's Cyclopedia of Universal Knowledge (1883)
  - New People's Cyclopedia of Universal Knowledge 1889 re-issue (Three of four vols. in link)
- Cassell's Concise Cyclopaedia (1883)
  - Cassell's Cabinet Encyclopedia (1904)
- Peale's Popular Educator and Cyclopedia (1883)
  - Home Library of Useful Knowledge 1886 re-issue
- Library of National Information and Popular Knowledge Vols 3-4, Vols 5-6 (1884)
- Home Teacher (1886)
- Cassell's Miniature Cyclopaedia (1888)
- Pocket Encyclopaedia (1888)
- Century Dictionary (1889)
  - Century Dictionary and Cyclopedia (1901)

=== 1890s ===
- Ready Reference. 1890.
- World Wide Encyclopedia and Gazetteer (1890)
- Cassell's Storehouse of General Information (1891)
  - Cassell's Encyclopedia of General Information (1908)
- The Complete Compendium of Universal Knowledge (1891)
- Ogilvie's Encyclopedia of Useful Information (1891)
- Chamber's Condensed Encyclopedia (1895)
- Harper's Book of Facts (1895)
- Pears Cyclopaedia (1897), originally named Pears' Shilling Cyclopaedia
- The People's Select Cyclopedia (1897), by Charles Nisbett
- Standard Cyclopaedia (1897)
  - X-Rays of Intellectual Light (1899)
  - Standard American Book of Knowledge (1900)
  - World's Book of Knowledge (1901)
  - 20th Century Book of Universal Knowledge (1901)
  - American Educator and Library of Knowledge (1902)
  - New Century Cyclopedia of Universal Knowledge (1902)
  - American Home Educator and Book of Universal Knowledge (1903)
  - Standard Library of Knowledge (1904)
- Chandler's Encyclopedia (1898)
  - New Complete Condensed Encyclopedia (1909)
- Universal Cyclopaedia and Dictionary edited by Charles Morris (1898)
  - International Library of Reference (1899)
  - Universal Reference Library (1900)
  - Twentieth Century Encyclopedia link goes to vols. 2, 5 and 6 (1901)
  - Imperial Reference Library (1901)
- Columbian Cyclopaedia (1899)
  - Imperial Encyclopedia and Dictionary (1903)
  - New Imperial Encyclopedia and Dictionary (1906)
  - United Editors Encyclopedia and Dictionary (1909)
  - United Editors Perpetual Encyclopedia (1911)
- Werner's Universal Encyclopedia (1899)

=== Britannica ===
- Supplement to the third edition (1801, 1803)
- Fourth edition (1810)
- Fifth edition (1817)
- Sixth edition (1823)
- Supplement to the fifth edition, (later known as the supplement to the fourth, fifth and sixth editions) (1824)
- Seventh edition (1842)
- Eighth edition (1860)
- Ninth edition (1889)

== In Arabic ==
- Al-Muhit al Muhit ("The ocean of oceans"), Butrus al-Bustani (1867)

== In Czech ==
- Riegrův slovník naučný (11 volumes, 1860–1874; supplement vol. 1890. Online)
- Stručný všeobecný slovník věcný (9 volumes, 1874–1885, online)
- Příruční slovník všeobecných vědomostí (2 volumes, 1882–1887, editor Josef Rank, vol 1 online)
- Otto's encyclopedia (Ottův slovník naučný, 28 vols., 1888–1909, 12 supplement vols., Ottův slovník naučný nové doby (incomplete), 1930–1943, volumes 1–28 online)

== In Danish ==
- Salmonsens Konversationsleksikon (19 volumes, 1893–1911)

== In Dutch ==
- Winkler Prins Geïllustreerde Encyclopaedie (1870–1882; 2nd ed. 1884–1888)

== In French ==
- Dictionnaires généraux, universels, encyclopédiques, et autres… - a bibliography of French encyclopedias up to Larousse
- Encyclopédie Méthodique (Panckoucke), 1782–1832
- Encyclopédie nouvelle (Pierre Leroux and Jean Reynaud), 1839–1840
- Petite Encyclopédie du jeune âge, Larousse (1853)
- Grand dictionnaire universel du XIXe siècle by Pierre Larousse (17 volumes 1866–1877), really an encyclopedia despite its name
- La Grande Encyclopédie, general secretaries of the editorial board: Ferdinand-Camille Dreyfus and André Berthelot (31 volumes 1886–1902)

== In German ==
- Oekonomische Encyklopädie (General System of State, City, Home and Agriculture), Editor Johann Georg Krünitz (242 Volumes 1773–1858)
- Allgemeine Encyclopädie der Wissenschaften und Künste (Ersch–Gruber; 1818–1889, uncompleted)
- Brockhaus (eds. 1–14 by 1900)
- Pierers Universal-Lexikon (1824–1836; 7th ed. 1888–1893)
- Meyers Konversations-Lexikon (1839–1855; 5th ed. 1893–1897)
- Herders Konversations-Lexikon (1854–1857; 2nd ed. 1875–1879)

== In Hungarian ==
- Egyetemes magyar encyclopaedia (1859–1876) (→ hu)
- A Pallas Nagy Lexikona (1893–1897)

== In Italian ==
- Piccola Enciclopedia (1853)
- Nuova Enciclopedia Italiana (1875)
- Enciclopedia universale illustrata (1887) by Francesco Vallardi

== In Japanese ==
- Gunsho Ruijū (1819)
- Koji Ruien (1896–1914)

== In Persian ==
- Yadgar-i-Bahaduri (1834)

== In Polish ==
- Encyklopedia Powszechna or Encyklopedia Orgelbranda (1st Edition, 28 volumes, 1859–1868)
- Encyyklopedia Kościelna (33 volumes, 1873–1933)

== In Romanian ==
- Enciclopedia română (Editor: Constantin Diaconovich, 3 volumes, 1896–1904)

== In Russian ==
- Plyushar's Encyclopedic Lexicon (17 volumes, 1834–1841)
- Starchevsky's Spravochny entsiklopedichesky slovar (12 volumes, 1847–55)
- Brockhaus and Efron Encyclopedic Dictionary (86 volumes, 1890–1906)
- Granat Encyclopedic Dictionary (9 volumes, 1891–1903)

== In Spanish ==
- Enciclopedia moderna (1851), Francisco de P. Mellado

== In Swedish ==
- Conversations-lexicon (4 volumes, 1821–1826), a translation of Brockhaus 2nd edition
- Svenskt konversationslexikon (4 volumes, 1845–1851), by Per Gustaf Berg
- Nordisk familjebok (20 volumes, 1876–1899; 2nd ed. 1904–1926)

== In Telugu ==
- Pedda Bala Siksha (1832)

== In Turkish ==
- Kamus-ül-Ulûm ve’l-Maarif Editor Ali Suavi, 1870
- Lûgaat-i Tarihiye ve Coğrafiye Editor Ahmet Rıfat Efendi, 1881 (7 volumes)
- Sicil-i Osmani Editor Mehmet Süreyya Bey, 1890
- Kamus-ül-Alam Editor » : Şemsettin Sami, 1899 (6 volumes)

== In Welsh ==
- Encyclopaedia Cambrensis (1854)

== Specialist encyclopedias ==
- The Engineer's and Mechanic's Encyclopaedia (1836/1837; 2nd ed. 1849; often cited as Hebert's Encyclopaedia)
- Cyclopaedia of Useful Arts and Manufactures (1852; often cited as Tomlinson's Cyclopaedia)
- Dictionary of Greek and Roman Antiquities (1842)
- Dictionary of Greek and Roman Biography and Mythology (1870)
- Cyclopaedia of Political Science - Cyclopaedia of Political Science, Political Economy, and the Political History of the United States by the Best American and European Writers] (1881–1899), John J. Lalor
- The Cyclopedia of New Zealand (1897–1908, mainly self-published)
- Brewer's Dictionary of Phrase and Fable (1870)
- Dictionary of Political Economy (1894–1899), by Inglis Palgrave
- Hastings' Dictionary of the Bible (1898–1904)
- Cyclopedia of Universal History (1880–1884), world history
- Ridpath's Universal History (1895), world history
- Biographie universelle des musiciens et bibliographie générale de la musique, François-Joseph Fétis (1835–1844)
- Dictionnaire de chimie pure et appliquée, Charles-Adolphe Wurtz (1874–1878)
- Dictionnaire de botanique, Henri Ernest Baillon (1876–1892)
- Nouvelle Biographie Générale, Ferdinand Hoefer (1853–1866)
- Realencyclopädie der Classischen Altertumswissenschaft, "Pauly–Wissowa" (1839–1852, 2nd ed. 1890–1980)
- Realencyklopädie für protestantische Theologie und Kirche, Johann Jakob Herzog (1853–1868)
- Handbuch der Organischen Chemie, Friedrich Konrad Beilstein (1880–1882)
- Lexikon der gesamten Technik, Otto Lueger (1st Edition 1894–1899)
- Encyklopädie der mathematischen Wissenschaften, Felix Klein (1898–1933)
- Enzyklopädie der philosophischen Wissenschaften im Grundrisse, G. F. W. Hegel (1817)
- Diccionario geográfico, estadístico, histórico, de la isla de Cuba (1863–66)
- Military Encyclopedic Lexicon (15 volumes, 1837–1852)
- Encyclopedia of Military and Marine Sciences (8 volumes, 1883–1897)

== See also ==
- History of the Encyclopædia Britannica
