= List of encyclopedias by date =

This is a list of encyclopedias, arranged by time period. For other arrangements, see Lists of encyclopedias.

== Encyclopedias before 1700 ==
- Nine Books of Disciplines by Marcus Terentius Varro (116 BC-27 BC)
- Naturalis Historia by Pliny the Elder (AD 77-79); highly influential through the Middle Ages, the oldest encyclopedia for which there is an extant copy
- De verborum significatione by Sextus Pompeius Festus (2nd century AD)
- Onomasticon by Julius Pollux (2nd century AD)
- The Emperor's Mirror (Huanglan), Wei dynasty (220-265), Chinese
- De compendiosa doctrina, by Nonius Marcellus (probably AD 4th century)

=== 5th century ===
- Martianus Capella, De nuptiis Mercurii et Philologiae, introduced the division in seven liberal arts

=== 6th century ===
- Bṛhatsaṃhitā of Varāhamihira (c. 505 – c. 587)
- Cassiodorus' Institutiones (full title: Institutiones Divinarum et Saecularium Litterarum), AD 560; first Christian encyclopedia

=== 7th century ===
- Yiwen Leiju (622), Tang dynasty, Chinese
- St. Isidore of Seville's Etymologiae, AD 636; Christian encyclopedia, most influential encyclopedia of the early Middle Ages
- Fayuan Zhulin, AD 668, a Buddhist encyclopedia of 100 volumes, compiled by Tao-shih

=== 8th century ===
- Venerable Beda, De natura rerum

=== 9th century ===
- Adab al-katib (The book of knowledge) by Ibn Qutayba (828–889); the earliest Arabic work that could be called an encyclopedia
- Bibliotheca by Patriarch Photius (9th century), the earliest Byzantine work that could be called an encyclopedia
- Hrabanus Maurus, 842. De rerum naturis (On the nature of things), derived from Isidore's text
- De Administrando Imperio, a domestic and foreign policy manual by emperor Constantine VII

=== 10th century ===
- Suda (10th century)
- Four Great Books of Song (Song Sida Shu) (10th to 11th century), Song dynasty, Chinese
- Wamyō Ruijushō

=== 11th century ===
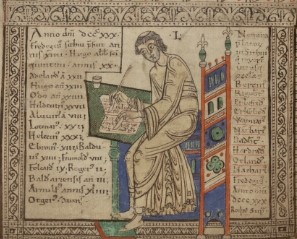
Lambert at work. Excerpt from the manuscript "Liber Floridus". Preserved in the Ghent University Library.

- De omnifaria doctrina, by Michael Psellos
- Speculum universale, by Radulfus Ardens

=== 12th century ===
- De diversis artibus, compiled 1100-1120 by Theophilus Presbyter
- Manasollasa composed by king Someshvara III of the Western Chalukya Empire of India.
- Liber Floridus, compiled in 1120 by Lambert of St. Omer
- Imago mundi, treaty of cosmography and history by Honorius Augustodunensis, about 1110
- De philosophia mundi, written about 1125–35 by William of Conches
- Didascalicon, by Hugues de Saint-Victor (1096-1141), proposal of a new classification of sciences and a new method of lecture of the Bible
- Hortus deliciarum, written by Herrade of Landsberg, the first woman to write an encyclopedia, between 1159 and 1175

=== 13th century ===
- Otia Imperialia by Gervase of Tilbury, 1214
- Guillaume d'Auvergne, De universo creaturarum, 1231.
- Gautier de Metz L’Image du monde, 1246, in Lorrain dialect, based on Honorius Augustodunensis
- Bartholomeus Anglicus, De proprietatibus rerum, 1240; the most widely read and quoted encyclopedia in the late-medieval period.
- Thomas of Cantimpré, Liber de natura rerum, 1256.
- Vincent of Beauvais, Speculum Majus, 1260, the most ambitious encyclopedia in the late-medieval period, with over 3 million words
- Brunetto Latini, Li Livres dou Trésor, in French

=== 14th century ===
- Al-Nuwayri, The Ultimate Ambition in the Arts of Erudition (1314–33)
- Ranulf Higden, Polychronicon (c.1344)
- Conrad of Megenberg, Buch der Natur (c.1349)
- James le Palmer, Omne Bonum
- Moses ben Judah (or Moses Nagari), Love in Delights (Ahavah ba-Ta'anugim, 1353–56)

=== 15th century ===
- Ming dynasty Chinese, Yongle Encyclopedia, 1403–08
- Domenico Bandini of Arezzo, Fons memorabilium universi, early 15th century
- Werner Rolevinck, Fasciculus temporum, 1474
- Alfonso de la Torre, Visio delectable, c.1484
- Jacob Meydenbach, Hortus Sanitatis, 1491

=== 16th century ===
- Giorgio Valla, De expetendis et fugiendis rebus, 1501
- Domenico Nani Mirabelli, Polyanthea nova, 1503
- Gregor Reisch, Margarita philosophica, 1503
- Johannes Aventinus, Encyclopedia orbisque doctrinarum, hoc est omnium artium, scientiarum, ipsius philosophiae index ac divisio, 1517
- Juan Luis Vives, De disciplinis libri XX, 1531
- Conrad Gessner, Historia animalium (Gessner book), 1551–58, 1587
- Charles Estienne, Dictionarium historicum, geographicum et poeticum, 1553
- Theodor Zwinger (1533–1588), Theatrum Humanae Vitae, 1565
- Paul Skalich, philosopher born in Zagreb, first to use the term encyclopedia in the current sense. Encyclopediae seu orbis disciplinarum tam sacrarum quam profanarum epistemon, 1559 (Basel, Switzerland), 1571 (Köln, Germany)
- Bernardino de Sahagún: La Historia General de las Cosas de Nueva España, 1545-1590
- Joachim Sterck van Ringelbergh, Lucubrationes vel potius absolutissima kyklopaideia (Basel), 1588
- Antonio Possevino, Bibliotheca selecta, 1593
- Bencao Gangmu (Compendium of Materia Medica) (1596), Ming dynasty, Chinese

=== 17th century ===
==== In Chinese ====
- Sancai Tuhui, compiled by Wang Qi and Wang Siyi (1609)
- Song Yingxing, Tiangong Kaiwu (The Exploitation of the Works of Nature), 1637

==== In English ====
- Sir Thomas Browne: Pseudodoxia Epidemica 1646-1672
- John Dunton: The ladies dictionary..., 1694

==== In French ====
- Dictionnaire théologique, historique, poétique, cosmographique et chronologique (1643) by Daniel de Juigné-Broissinière an adaptation of Charles Estienne's Dictionarium historicum, geographicum et poeticum (1553)
- Le portrait de la sagesse universelle, avec l'idée générale des sçiances et leur plan représenté en cent tables by Léon de Saint-Jean (1655) an extract in French of the authors Latin Enciclopaediae praemessum (1635)
- L'Encyclopédie des beaux esprits, contenant les moyens de parvenir à la connoissance des belles sciences by Saunier (1657)
- La science universelle by Jean Magnon (1663)
- Louis Moréri Le Grand Dictionnaire historique (The Great Historical Dictionary), 1671
- Antoine Furetière, Dictionnaire universel contenant généralement tous les mots françois, tant vieux que modernes, et les termes de toutes les sciences et des arts 1690.
- Pierre Bayle: Dictionnaire Historique et Critique (Historical and Critical Dictionary), 1695

==== In Hungarian ====
- János Apáczai Csere: Magyar encyclopaedia, c. 1655

==== In Latin ====
- Antonio Zara: Anatomia ingeniorum et scientiarum, 1615
- Johann Heinrich Alsted: Encyclopaedia septem tomi distincta 1630
- Laurentius Beyerlinck, Magnum Theatrum Vitae Humanae, 1631
- Peter Lauremberg, Pansophia, 1633
- Athanasius Kircher, Ars magna sciendi, 1669
- Michael Pexenfelder, Apparatus eruditionis tam rerum quam verborum per omnes artes et scientias, 1670
- Ivan Belostenec, Gazophylacium, seu Latino-illyiricorum onomatum aerarium, c. 1674 (completed in manuscript), published in Zagreb, 1740
- Johann Jacob Hofmann, Lexicon universale, historico-geographico-chronologico-poetico-phîlologicum‘, Basel, 1677
- Johann Christoph Wagenseil: Pera librorum iuvenilium, 1695

== Encyclopedias published 1700–1800 ==
=== In Chinese ===
- Complete Classics Collection of Ancient China (1725–26), Qing dynasty
- Complete Library of the Four Treasuries (1782), Qing dynasty

=== In English ===
==== American encyclopedias ====
- Dobson's Encyclopædia (1789–1798; largely a reprint of the Britannica's 3rd edition)

==== British encyclopedias ====
- The great historical, geographical, genealogical and poetical dictionary by Jeremy Collier (1701)
- An Universal, Historical, Geographical, Chronological and Poetical Dictionary (1703)
- Lexicon Technicum (1704)
- Chambers's Cyclopaedia, or an Universal Dictionary of Arts and Sciences (1728)
- An Universal History of Arts and Sciences by Dennis de Coetlogon (1745)
- Encyclopædia Britannica (1768, editions 2 and 3 by 1797)
- Chemical Dictionary by William Nicholson (1795)
- Encyclopædia Perthensis (1796–1806, ed 2 by 1816)

=== In French ===
- Dictionnaire de Trévoux (1704–1771)
- Encyclopédie, by Diderot and D'Alembert (1751–1772)
- Descriptions des Arts et Métiers (1761–1788)
- Encyclopédie ou dictionnaire universel raisonné des connaissances humaines, Yverdon, (1770–1780)
- Encyclopédie Méthodique by Charles-Joseph Panckoucke (1782–1832)

=== In German ===
- Reales Staats- und Zeitungs-Lexicon by Philipp Balthasar Sinold von Schütz (1704)
- Curieuses Natur- Kunst- Gewerk- und Handlungs-Lexicon by Paul Jacob Marperger (1712)
- Allgemeines Lexikon Der Künste und Wissenschaften by Johann Theodor Jablonski (1721)
- Musicalisches Lexicon by Johann Gottfried Walther (1732)
- Allgemeines Gelehrten-Lexicon by Christian Gottlieb Jöcher (1733–1751)
- Grosses vollständiges Universal-Lexicon by Johann Heinrich Zedler (1751–1754)
- Oekonomische Encyklopädie by Johann Georg Krünitz (1773–1858)
- Deutschen Encyclopädie (1788)
- Historisch-biographisches Lexikon der Tonküstler by Ernst Ludwig Gerber (1790–1792)
- Conversations-Lexikon mit vorzüglicher Rücksicht auf die gegenwärtigen Zeiten (1796–1808; see Brockhaus)

=== In Italian ===
- Vincenzo Coronelli Biblioteca Universale Sacro-Profana (1701–1707)
- Gianfrancesco Pivati Nuovo dizionario scientifico e curioso, sacroprofano (1746–1751)
- Lorenzo Hervás y Panduro Idea dell'Universo (1778–1792)

=== In Japanese ===
- Wakan Sansai Zue (1712)

=== In Polish ===
- Nowe Ateny (1745)
- Zbiór potrzebniejszych wiadomości (1781)

== Encyclopedias published 1800–1900 ==
=== In Arabic ===
- Muhit al-Muhit ("The ocean of oceans"), Butrus al-Bustani (1867)

=== In Czech ===
- Riegrův slovník naučný (11 volumes, 1860–1874; supplement vol. 1890)
- Otto's encyclopedia (28 volumes, 1888–1909)

=== In Danish ===
- Salmonsens Konversationsleksikon (19 volumes, 1893–1911)
- Den Store Danske Leksikon - several editions, up to 26 volumes (or more)

=== In Dutch ===
- Winkler Prins Geïllustreerde Encyclopaedie (1870–1882; 2nd ed. 1884–1888)

=== In English ===
==== American encyclopedias ====
- Minor Encyclopedia (1803), edited by Thaddeus M. Harris, copies much of Kendal's Pocket Encyclopedia
- Domestic Encyclopedia (1803–1804), first American edition, expanded to 5 volumes (4 in the British); second American edition 1821
- Low's Encyclopaedia (1805–1811), the first true American encyclopedia
- Encyclopaedia Americana (1829–1833), 13 volumes, editor Francis Lieber.
- New American Cyclopaedia (1857–1863), 16 volumes, editors George Ripley and Charles A. Dana
- American Cyclopaedia (1873–1876), the retitled New American Cyclopaedia
- Johnson's New Universal Cyclopaedia (1876–1878), 4 volumes; editors Frederick Augustus Porter Barnard and Arnold Henry Guyot
- Cyclopedia of Universal History (1880–1884), world history
- The Complete Compendium of Universal Knowledge (1891)
- Ridpath's Universal History (1895), world history
- Johnson's Universal Cyclopaedia (1893–1897), the retitled Johnson's New Universal Cyclopaedia, edited by Charles Kendall Adams.
- Alden's Library of Universal Knowledge (1879), a reprint of Chambers's Encyclopaedia with American additions
- International Cyclopaedia (1884), initially largely a reprint of Alden's Library of Universal Knowledge, but later editions were improved by editors Harry Thurston Peck, Selim Peabody, Frank Moore Colby, and Daniel Coit Gilman
- People's Cyclopedia of Universal Knowledge (1881), 3 volumes, 700 pages each, editor W. H. De Puy. Contains much from Chambers's Encyclopaedia. The 1898 title was The New People's Cyclopedia of Universal Knowledge.
- Barkham Burroughs' Encyclopaedia (1889), miscellany

==== British encyclopedias ====
- Encyclopaedia Londinensis (1801)
- English Encyclopaedia (1802)
- Domestic Encyclopedia (1802)
- Kendal's Pocket Encyclopedia (1802, second edition 1811)
- Rees's Cyclopædia (1802–1819)
- Encyclopædia Perthensis (Perth, Scotland, 1803;1816)
- Encyclopædia Britannica (fourth edition, 1810; ninth edition by 1889)
- Edinburgh Encyclopædia (1808–1830)
- British Encyclopedia, or Dictionary of Arts and Sciences (1809)
- Encyclopædia Edinensis (1816)
- Pantologia (1813)
- Encyclopædia Metropolitana (1822–1845)
- Penny Cyclopaedia (1833–1846)
- English Cyclopaedia (1854–1862, supp. 1869–1873)
- Chambers's Encyclopaedia (1860; no relation to Chambers's Cyclopaedia of the 18th century)
- Brewer's Dictionary of Phrase and Fable (1870)
- Dictionary of Political Economy (1894–1899), by Inglis Palgrave
- Pears Cyclopaedia (1897), originally named Pears' Shilling Cyclopaedia
- The People's Select Cyclopedia (1897), by Charles Nisbett
- Hastings' Dictionary of the Bible (1898–1904)

=== In French ===
- Dictionnaires généraux, universels, encyclopédiques, et autres… - a bibliography of French encyclopedias up to Larousse
- Encyclopédie Méthodique (Panckoucke), (1782–1832)
- Biographie universelle des musiciens et bibliographie générale de la musique, François-Joseph Fétis (1835–1844)
- Encyclopédie nouvelle (Pierre Leroux and Jean Reynaud) (1839–1840)
- Petite Encyclopédie du jeune âge, Larousse (1853)
- Nouvelle Biographie Générale, Ferdinand Hoefer (1853–1866)
- Grand dictionnaire universel du XIXe siècle by Pierre Larousse (17 volumes 1866–1877), really an encyclopedia despite its name
- Dictionnaire de chimie pure et appliquée, Charles-Adolphe Wurtz (1874–1878)
- Dictionnaire de botanique, Henri Ernest Baillon (1876–1892)
- La Grande Encyclopédie, general secretaries of the editorial board: Ferdinand-Camille Dreyfus and André Berthelot (31 volumes 1886–1902)

=== In German ===
- Oekonomische Encyklopädie (General System of State, City, Home and Agriculture), Editor Johann Georg Krünitz (242 Volumes 1773–1858)
- Enzyklopädie der philosophischen Wissenschaften im Grundrisse, G. F. W. Hegel (1817)
- Allgemeine Encyclopädie der Wissenschaften und Künste (Ersch–Gruber; 1818–1889, uncompleted)
- Brockhaus (eds. 1–14 by 1900)
- Pierers Universal-Lexikon (1824–1836; 7th ed. 1888–1893)
- Realencyclopädie der Classischen Altertumswissenschaft, "Pauly–Wissowa" (1839–1852, 2nd ed. 1890–1980)
- Meyers Konversations-Lexikon (1839–1855; 5th ed. 1893–1897)
- Realencyklopädie für protestantische Theologie und Kirche, Johann Jakob Herzog (1853–1868)
- Herders Konversations-Lexikon (1854–1857; 2nd ed. 1875–1879)
- Handbuch der Organischen Chemie, Friedrich Konrad Beilstein (1880–1882)
- Lexikon der gesamten Technik, Otto Lueger (1st Edition 1894–1899)
- Encyklopädie der mathematischen Wissenschaften, Felix Klein (1898–1933)

=== In Hungarian ===
- Fejér György: A tudományok encyclopaediája rövid rajzolatban (2 vol.), Pest (1818)
- Lánghy István: A tudományok ismeretére tanító könyv, Pest (1827)
- Nyiry István: A tudományok öszvessége (3 vol.), Sárospatak (1829–1831)
- Közhasznú Esmeretek Tára (12 vol.), Pest (1831–1834) (→ hu)
- Ifjúsági ismeretek (4 vol.), Bécs (1840)
- Vállas Antal: Nemzeti encyclopaedia (7 vol.), Pest (1845–1848)
- Ujabb kori ismeretek tára (6 vol.), Pest (1850–1855) (→ hu)
- Ismerettár. Nélkülözhetetlen segédkönyv a történelem, természet s egyéb tudományok köréből (10 vol.), Pest (1858–1864) (→ hu)
- Egyetemes magyar encyclopaedia (1859–1876) (→ hu)
- Magyar lexikon (16 vol.), Budapest (1879–1885) (→ hu)
- A Pallas Nagy Lexikona (1893–1897)

=== In Japanese ===
- Koji Ruien (1896–1914)

=== In Polish ===
- Encyklopedia Powszechna or Encyklopedia Orgelbranda (1st Edition, 28 volumes, 1859–1868)
- Encyyklopedia Kościelna (33 volumes, 1873–1933)

=== In Romanian ===
- Enciclopedia română (Editor: Constantin Diaconovich, 3 volumes, 1896–1904)

=== In Russian ===
- Plyushar's Encyclopedic Lexicon (17 volumes, 1834–1841)
- Military Encyclopedic Lexicon (15 volumes, 1837–1852)
- Starchevsky's Spravochny entsiklopedichesky slovar (12 volumes, 1847–1855)
- Encyclopedia of Military and Marine Sciences (8 volumes, 1883–1897)
- Brockhaus and Efron Encyclopedic Dictionary (86 volumes, 1890–1906)
- Granat Encyclopedic Dictionary (9 volumes, 1891–1903)

=== In Spanish ===
- Enciclopedia moderna (1851), Francisco de P. Mellado
- Diccionario geográfico, estadístico, histórico, de la isla de Cuba (1863–1866)

=== In Swedish ===
- Conversations-lexicon (4 volumes, 1821–1826), a translation of the German Brockhaus 2nd edition
- Svenskt konversationslexikon (4 volumes, 1845–1851), by Per Gustaf Berg
- Nordisk familjebok first edition 20 volumes 1876–1899 (of which the two last ones are supplementary volumes)
- Nordisk familjebok second edition 38 volumes 1904–1926 (of which the last four and a part of number 34 are supplementary volumes)
- Nordisk familjebok third edition 26 volumes 1924–1939 (of which the end of number 25 and the entire 26th volume are supplementary, covering history until summer of 1939. The Spanish Civil War is covered until its end, but nothing on the Second World War)
- Nordisk familjebok third edition 26 volumes, second printing, including not so few coloured posters (like national maps, city maps a poster of all the flags of the world etc) and a huge number of full page black and white portraits. These The additional pages are not enumerated. 1942–1944. The second printing also got a new binder, but not even errors are corrected inside the work. Still a notable enough difference when compared to the first printing.
- Nordisk familjebok fourth edition 22 volumes 1951–1955.
- Svensk Uppslagsbok first edition 30 volumes 1929–1937
- Svensk Uppslagsbok second edition 32 volumes 1947–1955
- Bonniers Lexikon 15 volumes 1961–1967. Known as "Äpplet", "The Apple". Perhaps the most widely spread encyclopedia ever, written in the Swedish language. Looks nice on the shelf.
- Reflex 4 volumes for children age 10 and older. 1968–1971. A regular inventory in many Swedish class rooms during the 1970's.
- The new Bonniers Lexikon 24 volumes, 1993–1998.
- Nationalencyklopedin or NE 20 volumes, 1989–1996. DVD versions in 1996 and 2000. Online today.

=== In Turkish ===
- Kamus-ül-Ulûm ve’l-Maarif Editor Ali Suavi, 1870
- Lûgaat-i Tarihiye ve Coğrafiye Editor Ahmet Rıfat Efendi, 1881 (7 volumes)
- Sicil-i Osmani Editor Mehmet Süreyya Bey, 1890
- Kamus-ül-Alam Editor » : Şemsettin Sami, 1899 (6 volumes)

=== Encyclopedias about religion ===
- The Coptic Encyclopedia (1993)
- The Jewish Encyclopedia (1901–1906)
- Encyclopaedia Judaica
- Catholic Encyclopedia (1913)
- Schaff–Herzog Encyclopedia of Religious Knowledge (1914; public domain since 2004)
- St. Thomas Christian Encyclopaedia of India (1973,82,2010)
- Encyclopedia of Mormonism (1992)
- Orthodox Encyclopedia (Serbe)
- Encyclopaedia of Islam
- Hastings, James: Encyclopædia of Religion and Ethics (1908–1926)
- Unitarian-Universalist Encyclopedia

=== Specialist encyclopedias ===
- The Engineer's and Mechanic's Encyclopaedia (1836/1837; 2nd ed. 1849; often cited as Hebert's Encyclopaedia)
- Tomlinson's Cyclopaedia of Useful Arts (1852; often cited as Tomlinson's Cyclopaedia)
- A Dictionary of Greek and Roman Antiquities (1842)
- Dictionary of Greek and Roman Biography and Mythology (1870)
- Cyclopaedia of Political Science - Cyclopaedia of Political Science, Political Economy, and the Political History of the United States by the Best American and European Writers] (1881–1899), John J. Lalor
- The Cyclopedia of New Zealand (1897–1908, mainly self-published)

== See also ==
- Lists of encyclopedias
- List of encyclopedias by branch of knowledge
- List of encyclopedias by language (English)

== Bibliography ==
- Collison, Robert, Encyclopaedias: Their History Throughout the Ages, 2nd ed. (New York, London: Hafner, 1966)
