= Low's Encyclopaedia =

Early American encyclopedia

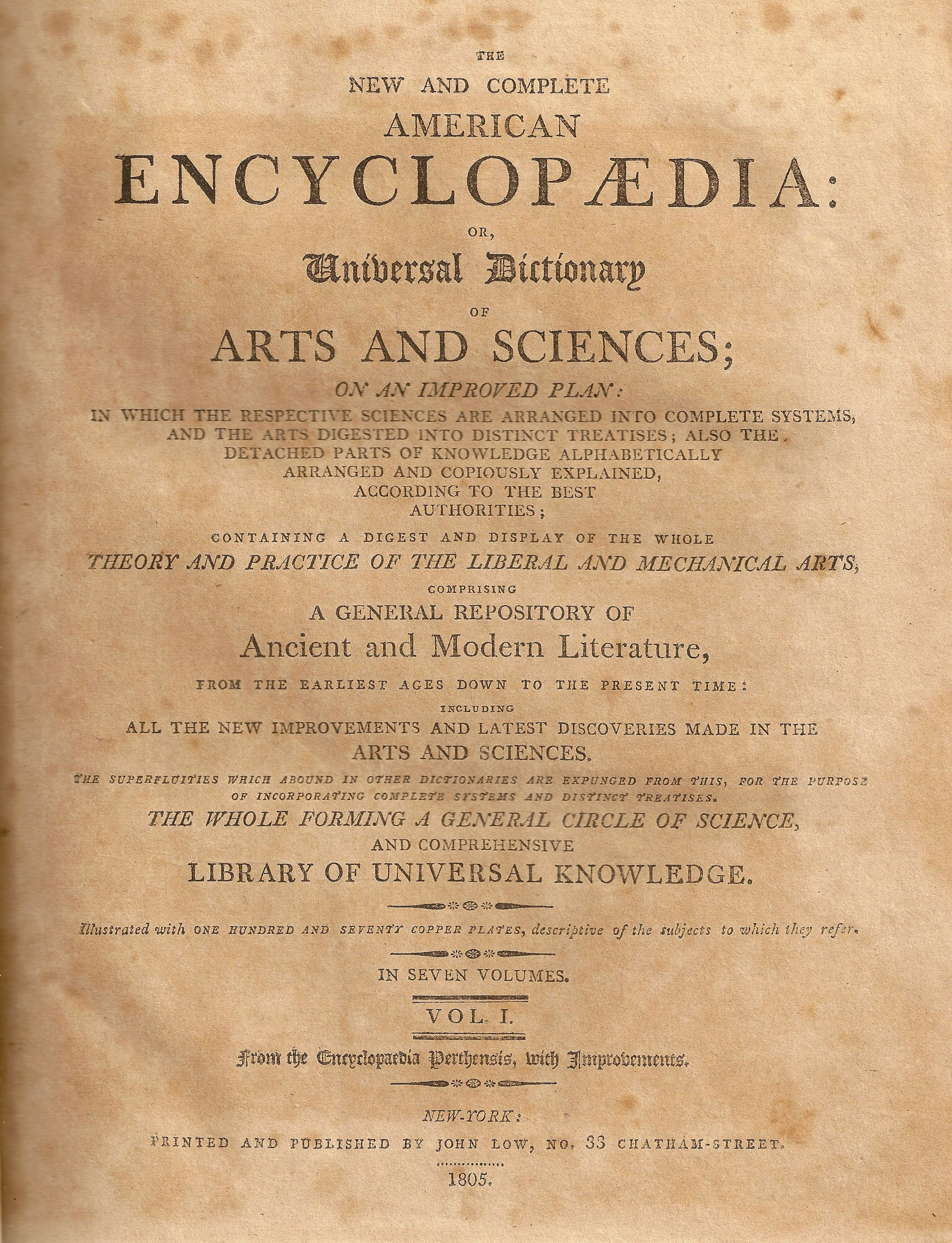
Low's Encyclopædia

Low's Encyclopædia is an early American encyclopedia, titled The New and Complete American Encyclopædia or Universal Dictionary of Arts and Sciences. It was published in New York City, from 1805 to 1811. Consisting of seven volumes quarto, it is noteworthy among America's earliest encyclopedias for having been written in the United States, as opposed to being an American reprint of a British work, as were, for examples, Dobson's Encyclopedia (1789–1798), the Bradford printing (1806–1820) of Rees's Cyclopædia (1802–1820), Samuel A. Mitchell's American printing (1816) of the British Encyclopedia, or Dictionary of Arts and Sciences (1809), or the Birch and Small printing (A. F. M. Willich and James Mease, Philadelphia, 1803) of the Domestic Encyclopedia (A. F. M. Willich, London, 1802).

== History ==
The first five volumes of the encyclopedia were published by John Low (1763–1809), and the final two by his widow and successor, Esther Prentiss Low (1762–1816). John Low was born in London and immigrated to America with Esther shortly after the birth of their son John (c. 1790–1829). By 1795, John Low had established himself as a printer and bookseller in New York City. Upon his death, Esther ran their printing establishment, and the younger John Low carried on in the printing business. She continued issuing the encyclopedia and printing maps posthumously until at least 1831.

- Vol. 1 – A (1805)
- Vol. 2 – B-C (1806)
- Vol. 3 – C-G (1807)
- Vol. 4 – G-J (1808)
- Vol. 5 – K-M (1808)
- Vol. 6 – M-P (1810)
- Vol. 7 – P-Z (1811)

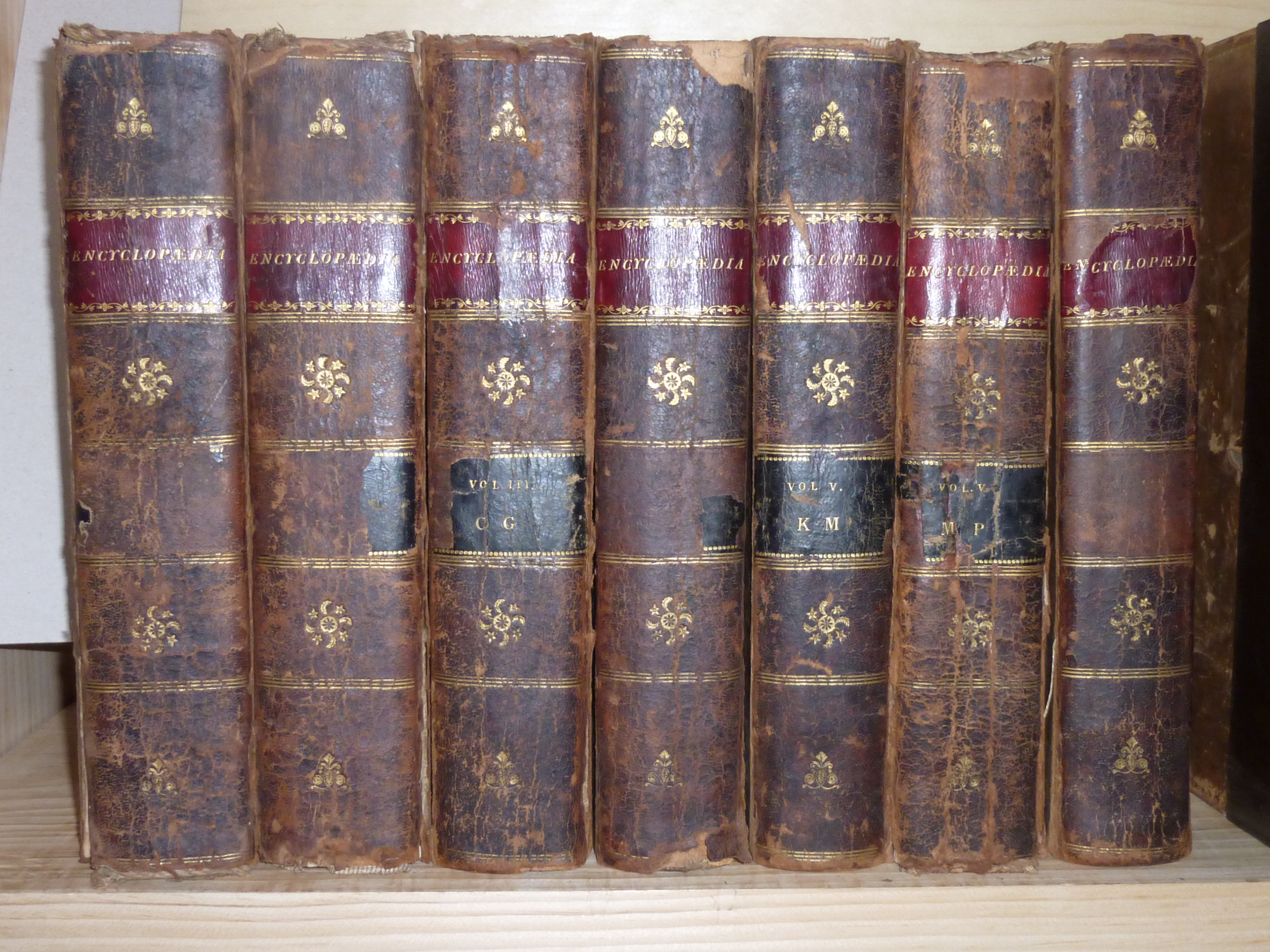
Low's Encyclopædia, 1805-1811

== Content ==
Low's Encyclopedia is primarily an American work. Although the title page says it was taken from the Encyclopædia Perthensis, this does not appear to be the case, as this work is seven volumes of around 650 pages each, while the latter work was 23 volumes of 800 pages each. Many of the minor definitional entries are borrowed from Perthensis or Britannica, usually with changes in wording, but a roughly equal number are original, and the articles are disproportionately of American concern: London takes up half a page while New York City gets five, when populations at the time were nearly 1 million for the former city and 80,000 for the latter. By comparison, Encyclopædia Britannica's fourth edition of 1810 gives the two cities 42 pages versus one and one half, respectively. Scotland receives four pages, while each of the states of the United States get equally long articles, and most maps are of the various states. The American Revolutionary War gets a 30-page treatment, while the British revolution of 1688 gets a paragraph. The article "New York" describes Sir William Johnson as being a land jobber and an enemy of the nation, for example.

Almost every American city, town, and county is listed, there are many biographies of Americans, and all the maps and most of the plates are original, a few plates being taken from Britannica. They are found with an inconsistent number of maps, usually around 30, and plates. Although the title page says there would be 170 copperplates, the copy in the Library of Congress only has 149. Most of the maps appear to have been published earlier by John Low; many are dated 1799 and 1800, and some appear to be even older. The map of Kentucky and Tennessee calls Kentucky a state, but Tennessee was called Southwestern Territory. This dates the map to the mid-1790s. It is known that John Low published and sold John Payne's A New and Complete System of Universal Geography in 1798-1800, with maps that re-appeared in this encyclopedia. From this we can credit Payne as cartographer for the maps which were not updated for the encyclopedia except in the inscriptions, which say "Engraved for the New Encyclopedia" where "Engraved for Payne's Universal Geography" had been. Other maps are newer, such as Pennsylvania, dated 1810, which was engraved and published by Esther Low. A reprint of the encyclopedia by Esther between 1811 and 1815 includes some new maps.

== Production and authorship ==
Plans for the encyclopedia were begun, and subscriptions began being taken, much earlier than the original publication date, as it is known that around 1802, Thomas Jefferson subscribed to a set, which was delivered in 1811 for $75. Its intention was to compete with Dobson's Encyclopedia, as stated in the "Preface", which was written in 1811 by Esther Low:

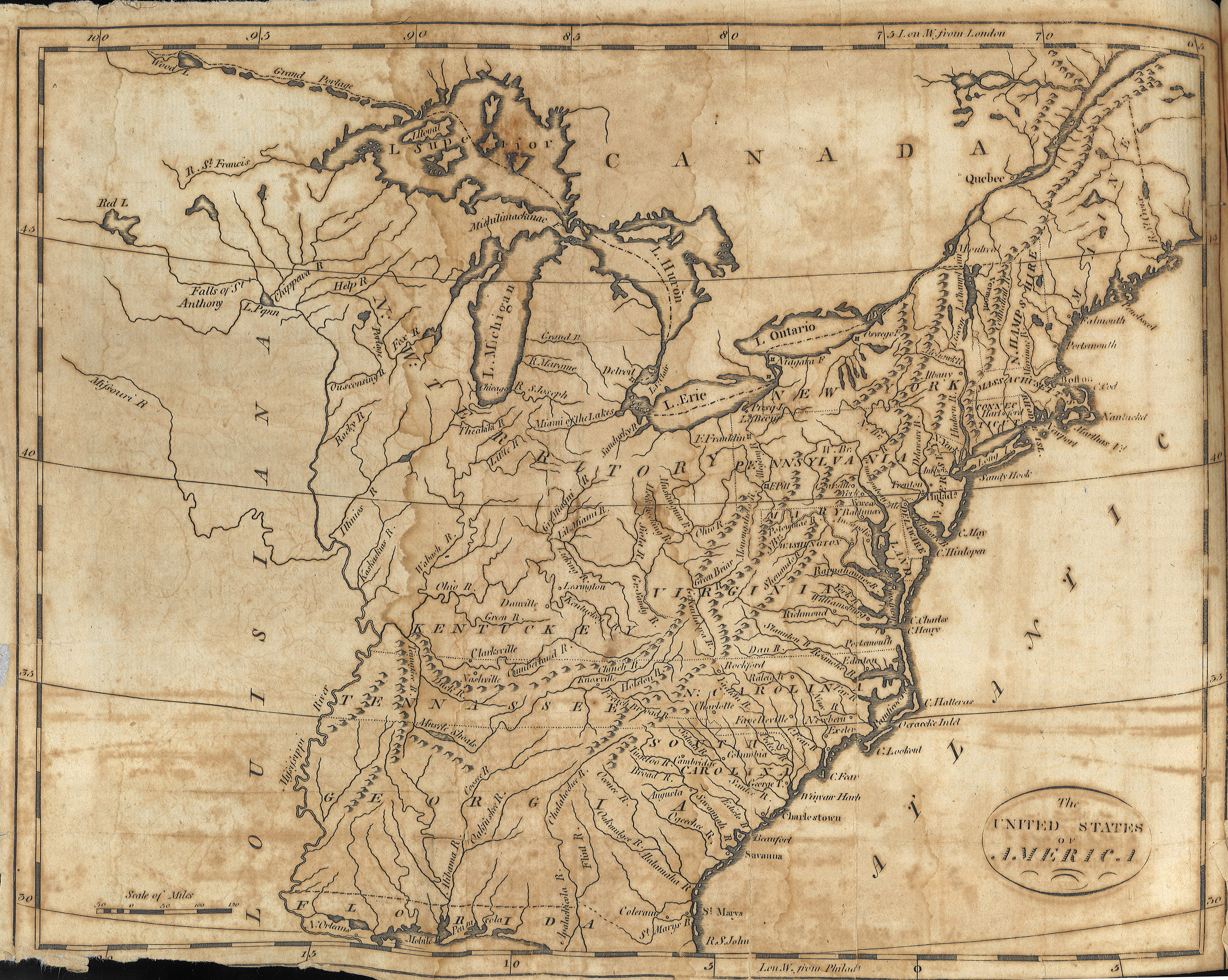
Map of United States. After the statehood of Tennessee (1796) but before that of Ohio (1803)

The motive that produced the publication of this Encyclopædia originated in the general voice of a numerous class of readers; who, although they might have been ever so anxious for the promulgation of literature, were yet induced to express their regret, that another similar work which had been published at Philadelphia, was of too voluminous and expensive a nature to answer the beneficial purposes of a general circulation. To remedy this complaint, they chose to decide in favor of another compilation; which, whilst it should embrace all the utility without the diffuseness of the former, would nevertheless, prove equally interesting, and at the same time more conveniently portable, and might be procured at nearly one-fourth of the expense.

No author or editor is mentioned in the preface, only:

...although it may be considered as a compilation of all the best dictionaries and books of science extant, yet it may justly claim in other respects, a right to originality; as a vast mass of matter has been generously supplied by men of the first eminence in the various pursuits of literature, as well natives of America as foreigners of distinction; who were well versed in the Mathematical, Theological, Physical, and other departments. To enumerate their names would be impracticable in the present instance, and to particularise (sic) any, might be thought invidious; they are all of them entitled to the warmest thanks of the publishers for their communications on the several topics on which they have so ably written. The Geographical, Botanical, and Chemical parts are nearly all original; as well as those of Agriculture, Gardening, etc.

== Other maps ==
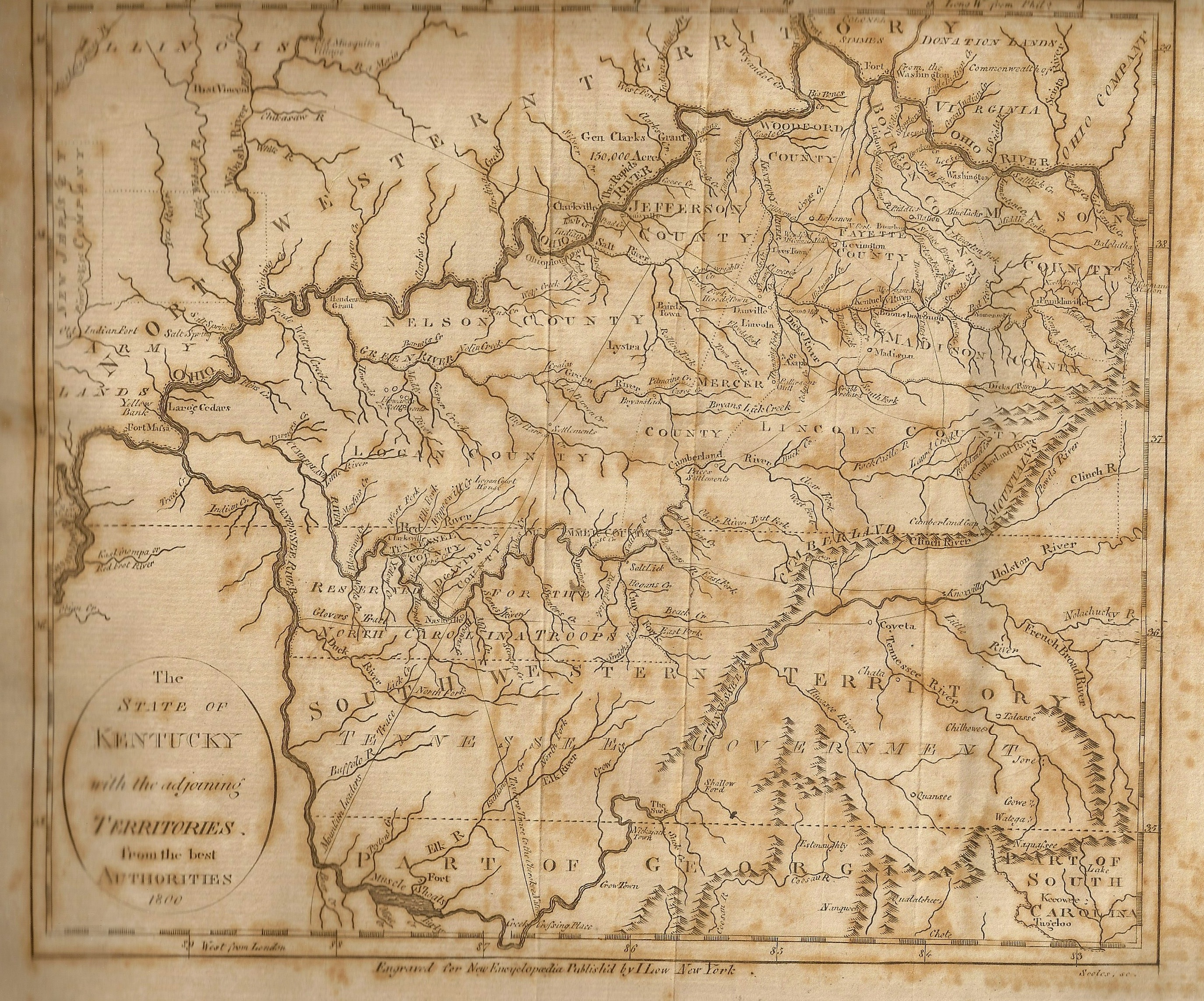
1800 "The State of Kentucky and adjoining Territories"

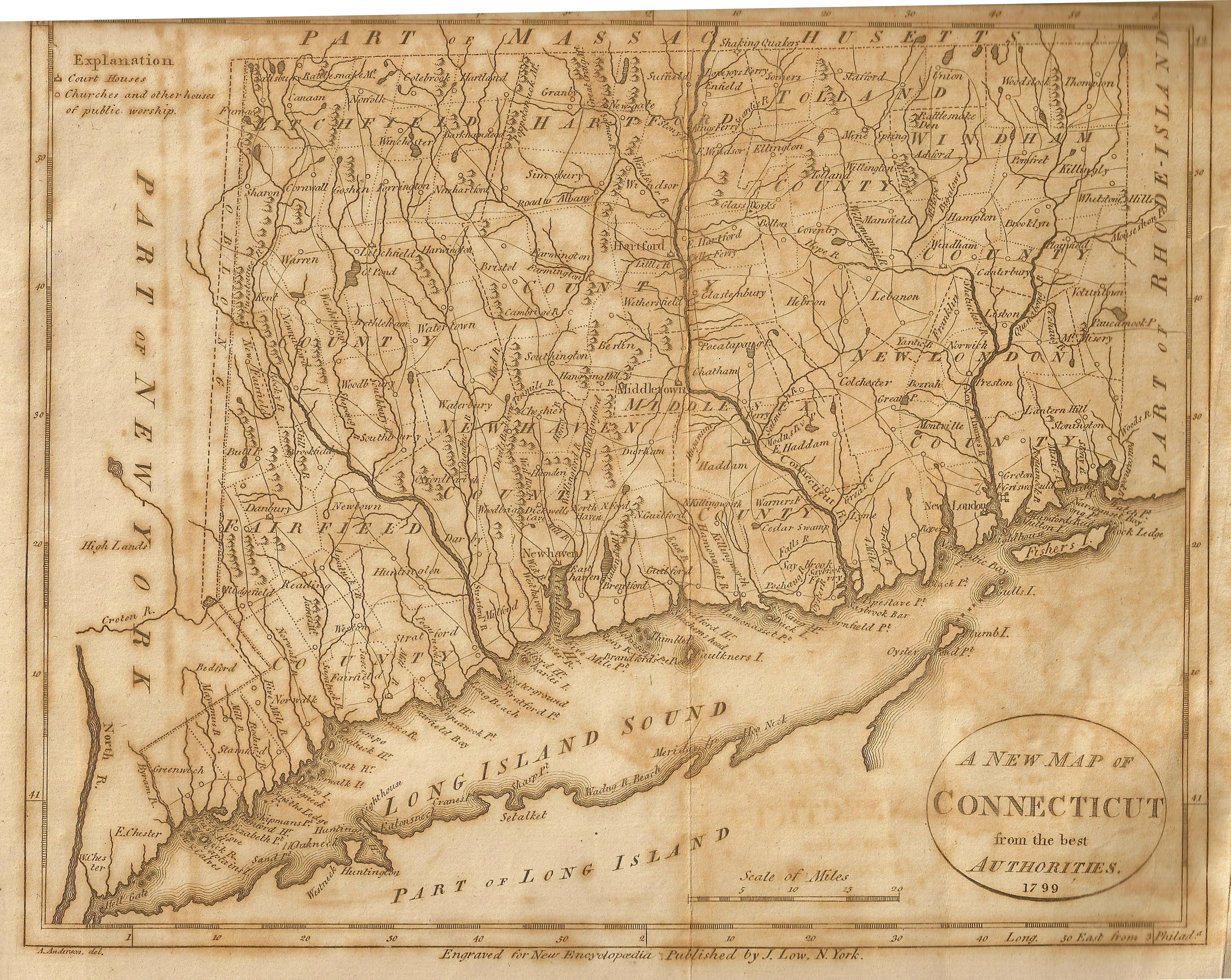
1799 map of Connecticut

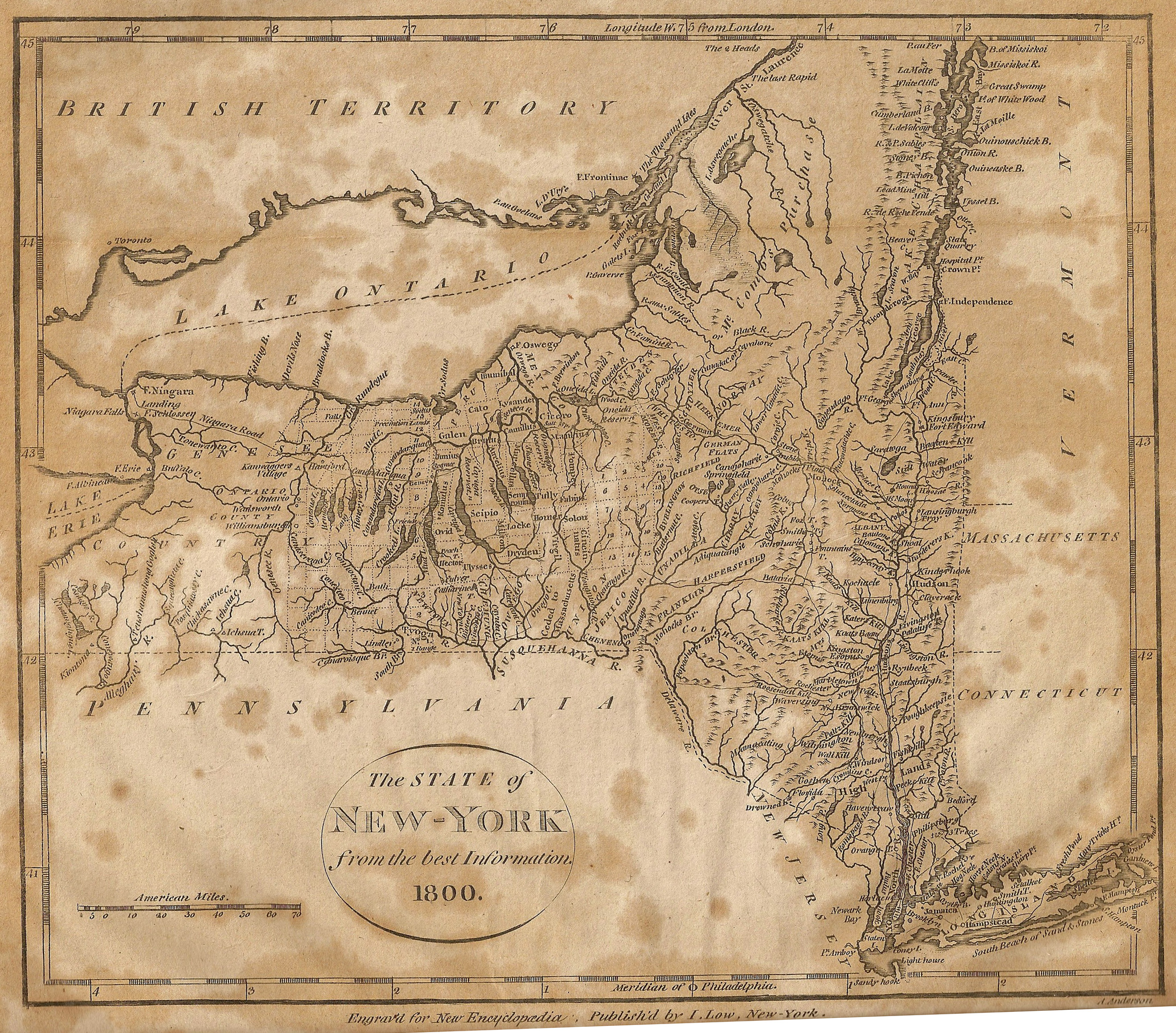
1800 map of New York

== See also ==
- Encyclopedia
- Encyclopedists
- List of historical encyclopedias
