= William Heap =

English engineer

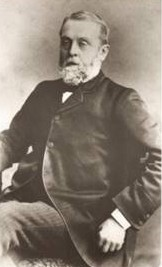
William Heap 1826–1912

William Heap III (23 September 1826 – 10 March 1912) was an English civil engineer and industrialist who principally worked on the building of railway lines in Britain, Europe, Canada and India through his work alongside manufacturer Thomas Brassey.

Brassey's firm was responsible for building one-third of the railways in Britain. Alongside Brassey, Heap oversaw the construction of major railway bridges such as Victoria Bridge in Montreal. Victoria Bridge was the longest bridge in the world at the time of its opening in 1860. After his work with Brassey, Heap founded Heap & Partners in 1866, which manufactures, supplies and distributes engineering equipment throughout the UK and around the world.

== Family ==
Heap was one of six children born to William Heap II and Mary née Smith at Isles House in Padiham, Lancashire. His grandfather, William Heap I, was a grocer in Padiham. William Heap II originally began work as a weaver in a cotton mill, and married Mary Smith of Burnley on 29 August 1822. Following the death of his father he took over the family grocery business as his elder brother John had died three years before. With the growth of the cotton, mining and quarrying industries, the population of Padiham grew significantly and the grocery business flourished with demand. Now as a prosperous merchant, William Heap II moved to Isles House where William Heap III was born.

== Education and family ==
William Heap III was educated at Whalley Grammar School, a boarding school four miles from his home in Padiham.

In June 1859 he married Eliza Mackenzie Burn Stuart Crichton at St Paul's Church, Seacombe in the Parish of Wallasey, Wirral. They remained in Seacombe, moving in 1870 to Liscard, Wirral with their eldest son William dying a year later. They had three sons who died in their early years, and two daughters. Their only surviving son, Charles, died five years later in 1891, leaving only two daughters: Mary and Elizabeth Ann.

== Career ==
Despite his father wanting him to go into the family business, Heap aspired to be an engineer and served an engineering apprenticeship after completing his education. He did his apprenticeship for 'William Evans of Cambridge, and worked on the Conwy.

Following the apprenticeship, Evans offered him a position as a junior engineer. Evans had just secured a contract to build the tubular Conway Railway Bridge. Conwy from 1846 – 1848 and Heap moved to Conwy to assist on the project. Here he met prominent figures in the industrial revolution including Robert Stephenson, who led the construction of the bridge, George Stephenson, Brunel and William Fairbairn.

Following the construction of the bridge at Conwy, Heap was brought in periodically in to assist the construction of the Britannia Bridge across the Menai Straits. Designed and built by Robert Stephenson, who Heap had worked with in Conwy, the bridge connected the island of Anglesey and the mainland of Wales. The bridge formed a critical link of the Chester and Holyhead Railway's route, enabling trains to directly travel between London and the Port of Holyhead.

At the age of 33 Heap became unemployed after William Evans of Cambridge fell into liquidation. Heap joined Thomas Brassey's new factory in Birkenhead which he had named The Canada Works. The machine shop was 900 feet (270 m) in length and included a blacksmith's shop with 40 furnaces, anvils and steam hammers, a coppersmith shop, and fabrication, woodwork and pattern shops. A library and reading room for all the workforce was also part of the site.

Heap became manager at the Bridge Department at Canada Works in 1856, a post he would hold for ten years. He worked on construction of the Victoria Bridge, Montreal, the longest bridge in the world at the time. The bridge represented a sizable challenge, with over 3 million holes needing to be punched and drilled in hundreds of thousands of components and shipped to a site thousands of miles away.

Heap was given the job of building all the bridges on the Delhi line, successfully completing bridges over the River Beeas, River Sutley and Jumna River. The last contract he carried out in India was on the Chord Line, which ran 147 miles on the Delhi to Calcutta, East Indian Railway. In February 1886 The Canada Works Engineering and Shipbuilding Company was floated as a limited liability company with William Heaps one of the directors. However, the venture was unsuccessful and closed down in 1889.

After fourteen years, in 1866 Heap parted company with Thomas Brassey and decided to set up his own company. In partnership with Thomas Arkle, he set up Heap and Arkle as a Merseyside iron merchant which also provided consultancy on the design of structures and pumps. The firm manufactured and supplied engineering goods throughout the UK and around the world. In 1870, the company moved to offices on Bank Chambers, Cook Street, Liverpool, before moving to Rumford Place, Liverpool, in 1876. In 1891, Thomas Arkle departed from the company and it became Heap & Co. John Douglas Crichton. Heap's nephew, joined the firm in 1894, and the company further developed the engineering side of the business. When Heap retired, he left the company in the hands of John Crichton and Arthur Atkins.

== Local politics ==
Heap was a member of the Wallasey Local board and sat on a number of committees including the Gas and Water Committee. In 1889 he was elected Chairman of the Wallasey Local Board and in 1886 was appointed a magistrate.

== Death ==
Heap retired from full-time work in 1910, leaving Heap & Partners Ltd in the hands of his nephew and Arthur Atkins, who served as a director. Due to deteriorating health, he died two years later on 10 March 1912.

== Heap & Partners Today ==
Today Heap & Partners Ltd, based in Birkenhead, Merseyside, designs, manufactures and distributes industrial valves, instrumentation and associated equipment to the oil and gas, chemical, petrochemical, pharmaceutical, power and utilities, nuclear, and life science industries worldwide.

== Bibliography ==
- Millar, John 1991, William Heap and his Company, ISBN 0-9510965-1-6,
- Hebert, Luke (1849). The Iron Tubular Bridge Over The River Conway. The Engineer's and Mechanic's Encyclopaedia. Vol 1 (2nd ed.). London: Thomas Kelly.
- Technology and Culture JSTOR 40646995
