= Willich (surname) =

Willich is a German-language surname.

- Anthony Florian Madinger Willich (died 1804), German medical writer
- August Willich (1810–1878), military officer in the Prussian Army
- Ehrenfried von Willich (1777–1807), Protestant chaplain
- Jodocus Willich (1501 or c. 1486–1552), German physician and writer
- Martin Willich (1945–2026), German jurist, politician and manager
- Quirin op dem Veld von Willich (died 1537), Roman Catholic prelate
