= Jack arch =

Brickwork

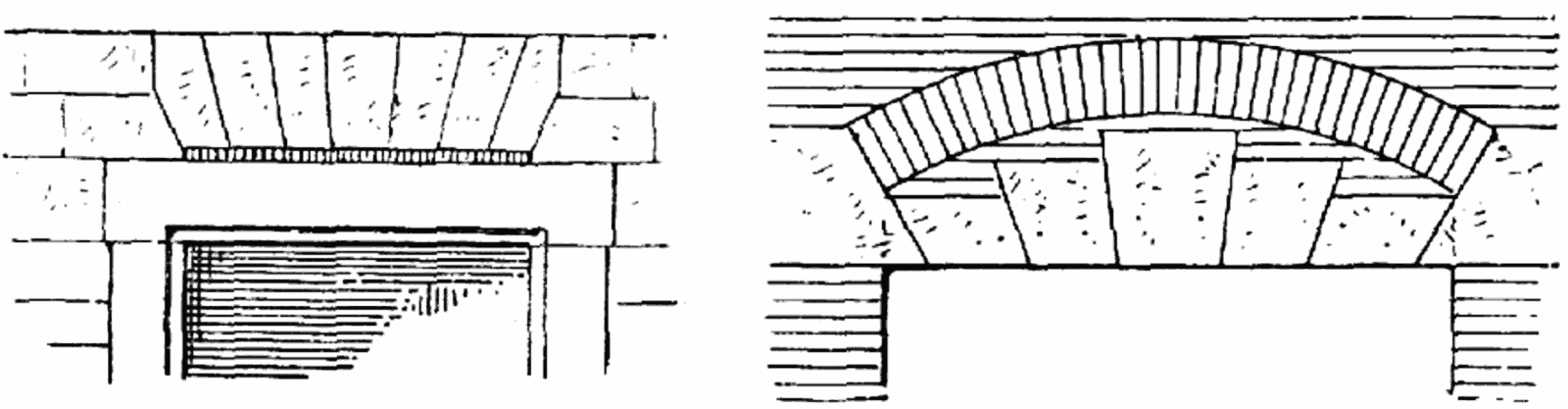
A jack arch, and a jack arch with a relieving arch above, as illustrated in the Lexikon der gesamten Technik

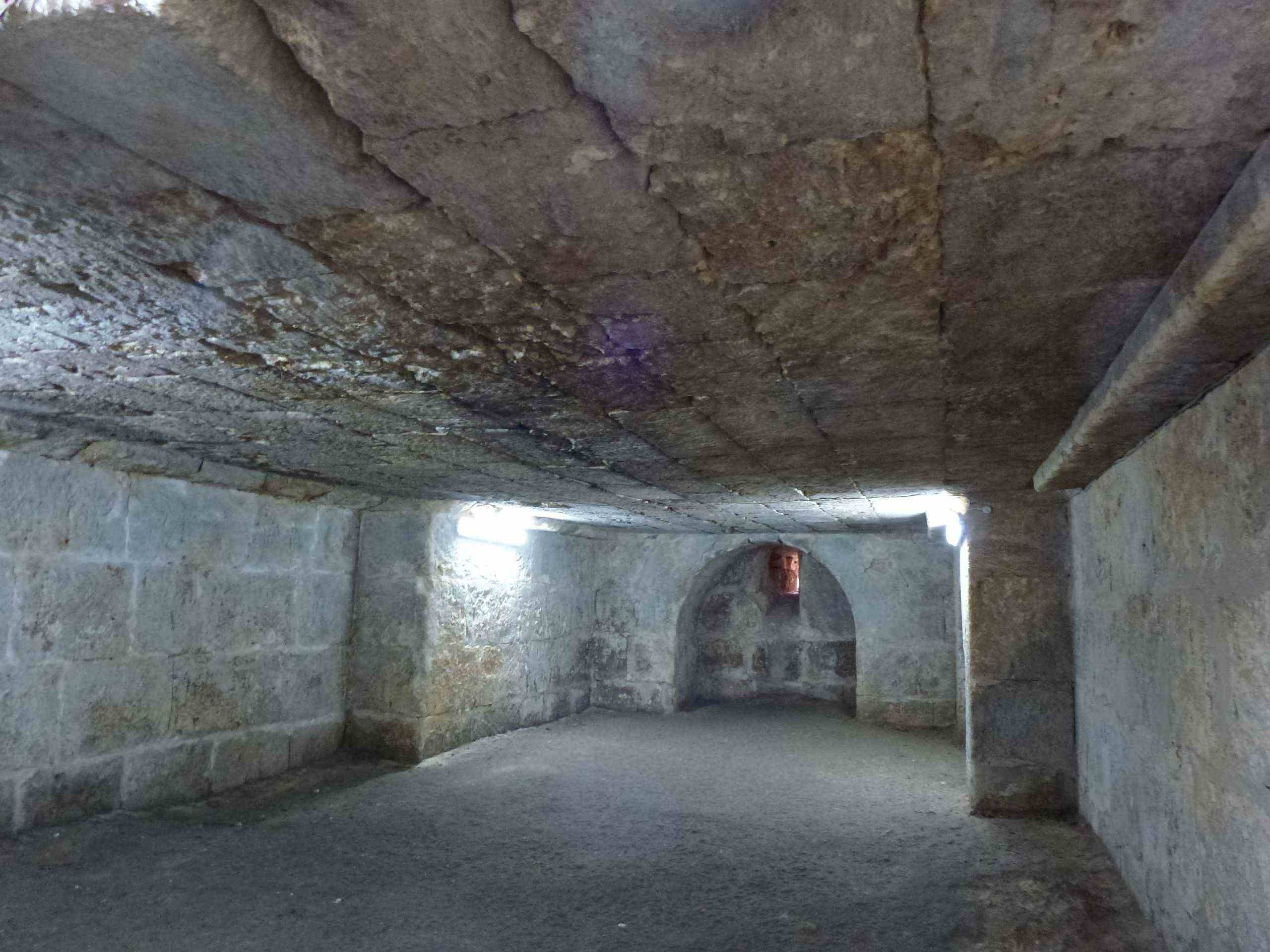
The Mardin jack arch, view from the crypt underneath

A jack arch is a structural element in masonry construction that provides support at openings in the masonry. Alternate names are lintel arch, flat arch and straight arch.

Unlike regular arches, jack arches are not curved in form. Instead, they are flat in profile and are used under the same circumstances as lintels. Unlike lintels, which are subject to bending stress, jack arches are composed of individual masonry elements cut or formed into a wedge shape that efficiently uses the compressive strength of the masonry in the same manner as a regular arch. Like regular arches, jack arches require a mass of masonry to either side to absorb the considerable lateral thrust created by the jack arch.

Jack arches have the advantage of being constructed from smaller pieces of material that can be handled by individuals, as opposed to lintels which must necessarily be monolithic and which must be oversized unless reinforced by other means.

In small-scale brick masonry projects, jack arches are typically sawn from an appropriately sized fired-clay lintel, giving a more precise and consistent joint width than field-sawn shapes.

There is considerable scope for incorporation of decorative patterns and elements into jack arches. Keystones, stepped or arched top profiles, and polychrome or contrasting colors and materials may all be used to create the desired effect.

== Sources ==
- Beall, Christine (1987). Masonry Design and Detailing (2nd ed.). McGraw Hill Book Company. ISBN 0-07-004223-3.
- DeLaine, Janet (1990). "Structural experimentation: The lintel arch, corbel and tie in western Roman architecture". World Archaeology. 21 (3): 407–424. doi:10.1080/00438243.1990.9980116. ISSN 0043-8243.
- Hourihane, C. (2012). "Arch". The Grove Encyclopedia of Medieval Art and Architecture. Vol. 1. Oxford University Press. pp. 129–134. ISBN 978-0-19-539536-5.
- Ramsey, Charles; Sleeper, Harold (1951). Architectural Graphics Standards (4th ed.). John Wiley & Sons, Inc.
