= List of fellows of the Royal Society elected in 1809 =

Fellows of the Royal Society elected in 1809.

== Fellows ==
1. Charles Frederick Barnwell (1781–1849)
2. Robert Bingley (died 1847)
3. William Thomas Brande (1788–1866)
4. James Burney (1750–1821)
5. Peter Leopold Louis Francis Nassau Clavering Cowper (1778–1837)
6. Francis Augustus Eliott (1750–1818)
7. John Gillon (1748–1809)
8. William Henry (1774–1836)
9. Charles Hoare (1767–1851)
10. John Jervis (1735–1823)
11. Alexander McLeay (1767–1848)
12. John Anthony Noguier (1763–1814)
13. John Rowley (1768–1824)
14. John Smith (died 1817)
15. Henry Warburton (1784–1858)
16. Robert Willan (1757–1812)
17. Lord Amelius Beauclerk (1771–1846)
