= John Clark Ridpath =

American educator, historian and editor

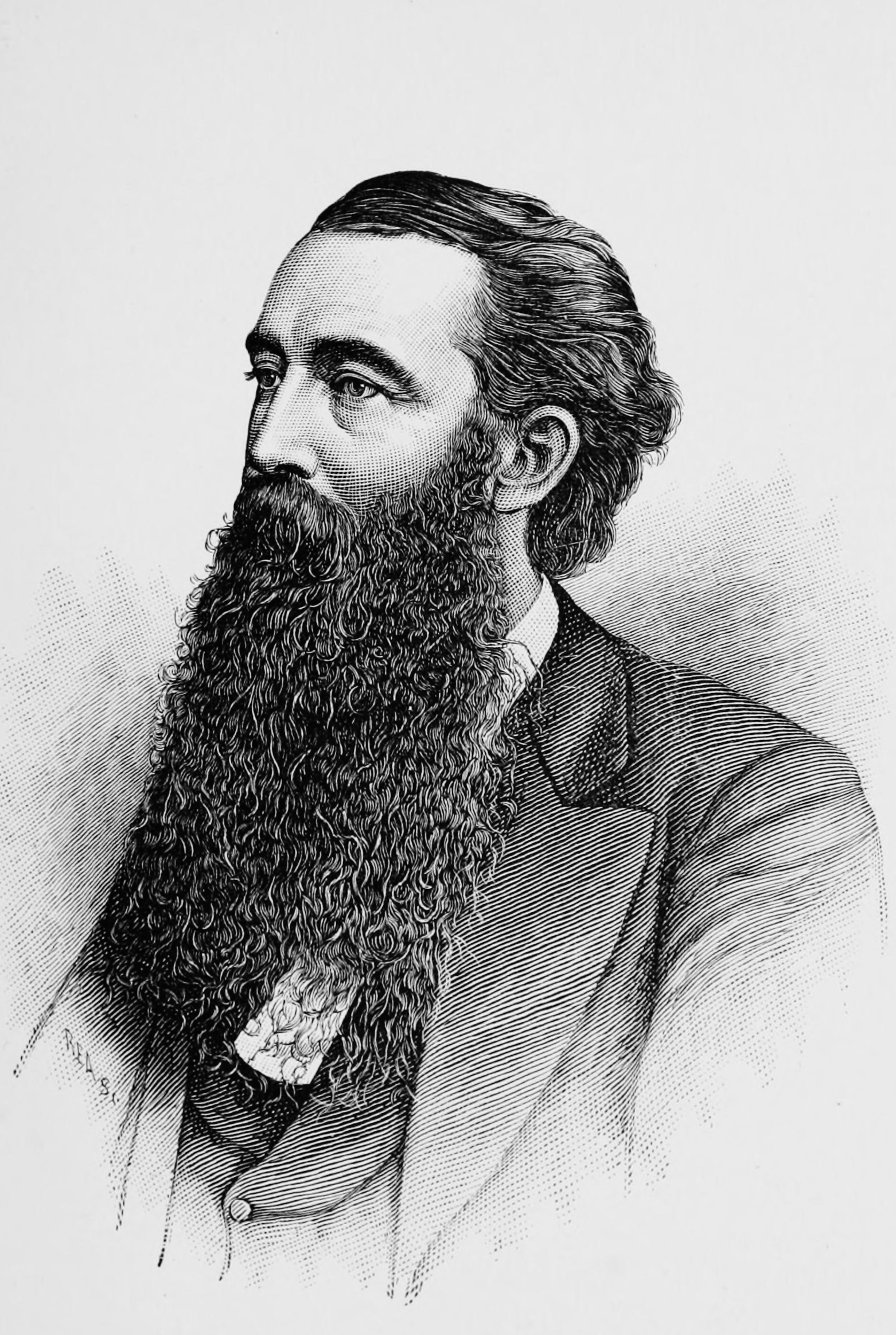
John Clark Ridpath

John Clark Ridpath (April 26, 1840 – July 31, 1900) was an American educator, historian, and editor. His mother was a descendant of Samuel Matthews, a colonial governor of Virginia. Among his most notable works is a series of volumes on a history of the world, titled Cyclopedia of Universal History.

== Youth ==
Born near the village of Fillmore, Indiana, in Putnam County, Indiana, his parents were from the part of Virginia that is now West Virginia, and began life under circumstances of great discouragement and hardship. The son had no early educational advantages besides those that he obtained at frontier schools, but his appetite for books was insatiable, and at seventeen he was a teacher.

== Education and career ==
At nineteen he entered Indiana Asbury College (later DePauw University), where he graduated with the highest honors of his class. He was a member of Phi Gamma Delta fraternity, as well. Before graduation he had been elected to an instructorship in the Thorntown, Indiana academy, and in 1864, he was made its principal. This office he held until 1867, when he was chosen to fill the chair of languages at Baker University, Baldwin City, Kansas. During the same period he served as superintendent of the Lawrenceburg, Indiana public schools.

In 1869 he was elected professor of English literature in Asbury College, and two years later he was assigned to the chair of belles-lettres and history of the same institution. In 1879 he was elected vice-president of the university, and he was largely the originator of the measures by which that institution was placed under the patronage of Washington C. DePauw, and took his name. In 1880, he received the degree of LL. D. from Syracuse University.

== Author ==
In 1885 Ridpath left his position at the university to devote himself more to writing. In the later 1890s, he was editor of a magazine called The Arena. He wrote biographies of James G. Blaine, James A. Garfield, William Ewart Gladstone, and James Otis. His popular volumes of history were successful, and reissued many times, even after his death.

Ridpath's Cyclopedia of Universal History was initially released in three volumes but later expanded to four volumes in 1890, covering the events of the 19th century. In subsequent years, this four-volume set was reissued in nine volumes, with the content largely unchanged. Notably, a tenth volume, covering the First World War, was published in 1921, with "John Clark Ridpath, LL.D." listed as the author, 21 years after his death. In 1895, the Jones Publishing Company reissued Ridpath's History of the World alongside his four-volume work detailing the "Evolution of Mankind and Story of All Races," originally published in 1894, in a complete, sixteen-volume set.

His publications include:

- Academic History of the United States (New York, 1874–5)
- Popular History of the United States of America (1876)
  - The United States: A History (1891)
- Grammar-School History (1877)
- Inductive Grammar of the English Language (1878–9)
- Monograph on Alexander Hamilton (1880)
- Life and Work of Garfield (1881)
- Life of James G. Blaine (1893)
- History of Texas (1884)
- A Cyclopaedia of Universal History (3 volumes, 1880–4)
- Ridpath's History of the World (8 volumes, 1894)
- Cyclopedia of Universal History (16 volumes, 1895)
- Notable events of the nineteenth century. Great deeds of men and nations and the progress of the world, in a series of short studies (1896)
- History of the World, Comprising Evolution of Mankind and Story of All Races (4 volumes, 1894)
- The Ridpath Library of Universal Literature (25 volumes, 1898)
- James Otis, the pre-revolutionist (1898)
- Story of South Africa: an account of the historical transformation of the dark continent by the European powers and the culminating contest between Great Britain and the South African Republic in the Transvaal War (1899)
- History of The United States (10 Volumes, 1905)

== Death ==
Ridpath died at Presbyterian Hospital in New York City, in 1900, from "a complication of diseases." His body was taken from the hospital by the Stephen Merritt Burial Company.

== Legacy ==
Today, in Greencastle, Indiana, next to DePauw University, stands Ridpath Primary School. Ridpath Primary School was named after his sister Martha.
