= English Encyclopaedia =

British encyclopedia (printed 1802)

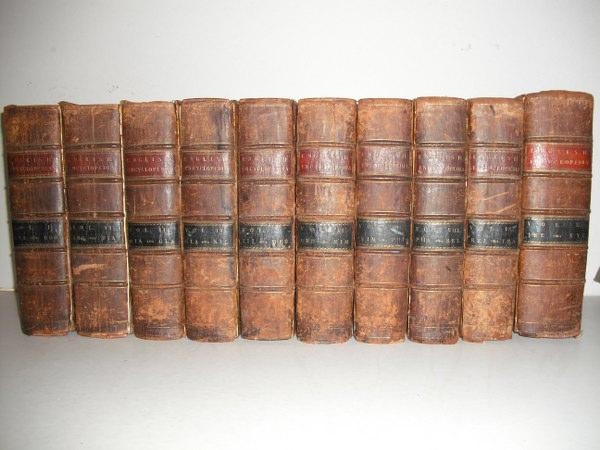
English Encyclopaedia

The English Encyclopaedia was an encyclopedia printed in London for George Kearsley in 1802.

It was 10 volumes; Vol. I 820pp., Vol. II 871pp., Vol. III 810pp., Vol. IV 805pp., Vol. V 812pp., Vol. VI 801pp., Vol. VII 796pp., Vol.VIII 784pp., Vol. IX 804pp., Vol.X 1150pp. plus 16pp., description of plates & 2pp. book ads by Kearsley & also incl. supplement which commences at page 183.

Title page says "A collection of treatises and a dictionary of terms covering the arts & sciences, illustrated with upwards of 400 copperplates. Compiled from modern authors of the first eminence in the different branches of science."

This encyclopedia would form the basis of Kearsley's later work Pantologia which he began compiling in 1802.

== See also ==
- Encyclopedists
- Reference work
- List of historical encyclopedias
