= William Thomas Brande =

English chemist (1788–1866)

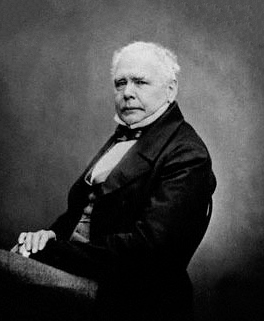
- Born: 11 January 1788; London, England
- Died: 11 February 1866 (aged 78); Tunbridge Wells, England
- Known for: Isolation of lithium Studies on alcohol
- Awards: Bakerian Medal (1813, 1819); Copley Medal (1813); FRS (1809)
- Scientific career
- Fields: Chemistry

Signature
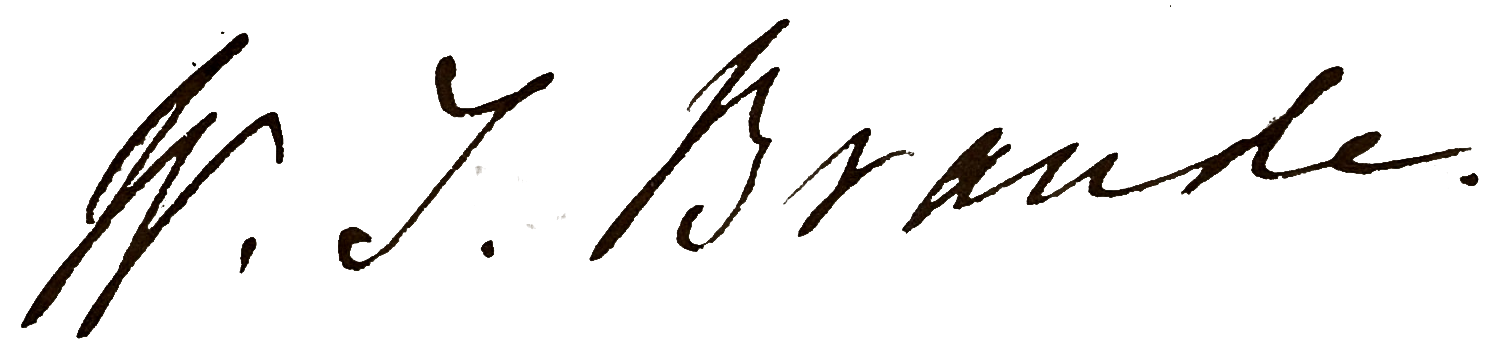

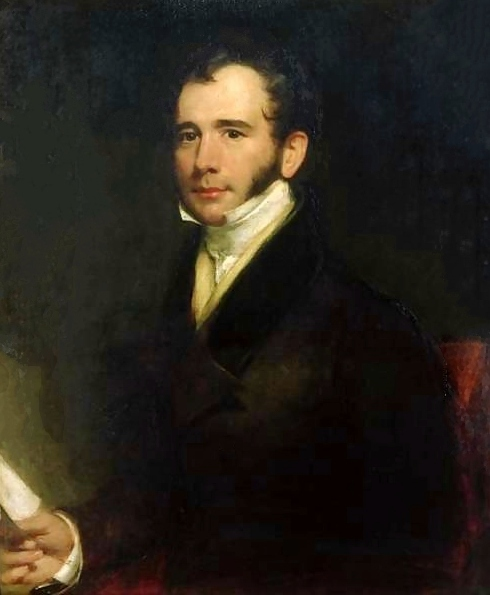
William Thomas Brande by Henry William Pickersgill, 1830

William Thomas Brande FRS FRSE (11 January 1788 – 11 February 1866) was an English chemist.

== Biography ==
Brande was born in Arlington Street, London, England, the youngest son of six children to Augustus Everard Brande an apothecary, originally from Hanover in Germany. He was educated first in Kensington and then in Westminster.

After leaving Westminster School, he was apprenticed, in 1802, to his brother, an apothecary, with the view of adopting the profession of medicine.

He studied medicine at Great Windmill Street Medical School and at St George's Hospital, before being drawn to chemistry following a meeting with Humphry Davy. He then began to lecture in chemistry, based on a sound knowledge of which he acquired in his spare time.

In 1811 he published the first of what were to be two very influential articles on the measurement of alcohol in fermented drinks, including wine, cider and ale. Until that point chemists had only been able to measure alcohol in distilled drinks (brandy, gin etc.), which many early temperance reformers had assumed to be a poison. By showing that alcohol was present in fermented drinks from the start (rather than being a by-product of the distillation process), Brande undermined the long-standing view that spirits were toxic, while wine and beer were more wholesome. These findings were later propagated by the Temperance movement and used to justify total alcoholic abstinence, or teetotalism.

In 1812 he was appointed professor of chemistry to the Apothecaries' Society, and delivered a course of lectures before the Board of Agriculture in place of Sir Humphry Davy, whom in the following year he succeeded in the chair of chemistry at the Royal Institution, London. In 1821 he was the first to isolate the element lithium, which he did by electrolysis of lithium oxide.

From about 1823 onwards, Brande worked increasingly with the Royal Mint, eventually becoming Superintendent of the Coining and Die Department.

Brande's Manual of Chemistry, first published in 1819, enjoyed wide popularity, and among other works he brought out a Dictionary of Science, Literature and Art in 1842. He was working on a new edition when he died at Tunbridge Wells.

He contributed articles to Rees's Cyclopædia on Chemistry, but the topics are not known.

== Lectures ==
In 1834, 1836, 1839, 1842, 1844, 1847 and 1850 Brande was invited to deliver the Royal Institution Christmas Lecture on Chemistry; Chemistry of the Gases; The Chemistry of the Atmosphere and the Ocean; The Chemistry of the Non-Metallic Elements; The Chemistry of the Gases; The Elements of Organic Chemistry and The Chemistry of Coal respectively.

== Publications ==
- Outlines of Geology (1817)
- Manual of Chemistry (1819)
- Manual of Pharmacy (1825)
- Dictionary of Materia Medica (1839)
- Dictionary of Science, Literature and Art (1842)
- Organic Chemistry (1854)

== Family ==
He married Anna Frederica Hatchett, daughter of the eminent chemist Charles Hatchett in July 1818.

== Death ==
Brande died in Tunbridge Wells in 1866, and is buried in West Norwood Cemetery, London (grave 1177, square 98).

== Sources ==
- Obituary – from Proceedings of the Royal Society of London, volume XVI, 1868, pages ii – vi (at end of volume)
- "Brande, William Thomas" . Dictionary of National Biography. London: Smith, Elder & Co. 1885–1900.
- Material on Brande's life and death by Frank James
