= Dictionary of Science, Literature and Art =

1842 reference work

The Dictionary of Science, Literature and Art was a single-volume reference work published in the mid-19th century by Longman's in the United Kingdom and by Harper Brothers in the United States. At the time it was considered a highly successful compendium of general but scholarly information. It was part of a trend toward cheaper, smaller reference works targeted at the middle and working classes.

The first edition was published in 1842 with 1352 pages. It was reprinted in 1845, 1847, 1848 and 1851. A second, revised edition was published in 1852 in 1423 pages. It was expanded to three volumes in 1866. The final edition was published in 1875 in three volumes.

The original editor in chief William Thomas Brande and associate editor was Joseph Cauvin. Upon Brandes death in 1866, Sir George William Cox took over as editor.

In the United States, the first edition was reprinted by Harper in 1844.

== Harper's Book of Facts ==
Harper's later published a successor called Harper's Book of Facts in 1895 with an updated edition in 1906.
