= Pedda Bala Siksha =

Pedda Bala Siksha is an encyclopedia in the Telugu language, suitable for children and adults. The book covers literature, arts, culture, morals, games, mythology, and science. It was considered part of the academic syllabus for students until the 1960s.

== History ==
In 1832, puduru (Vajjala)/ Seetarama Sastry was commissioned by his British friend, Mr Charles Brown, to write an educational book for British children, and wrote Bala Siksha. The first edition was only of 48 pages. The book was then reprinted in 1856, with 78 pages. By 1965, the book had been renamed Balala Viveka Kalpa Taruvu after the inclusion of material on literature, geography, Sanskrit prosody, and other topics.

In 1916, the book was published by Vavilla Ramaswamy Sastrulu and Sons under the name Pedda Bala Siksha after a thorough revision. Vajjala Seetarama Sastry's brother, Vajjala Narayana Sastry, assisted in editing it. Narayana Sastry accompanied Enugula Veeraswamy to Varanasi and on his return Veeraswamy fulfilled Narayana Sastry's request to visit Pudur, near Naidupet, Combined Nellore District.

There are now many independent versions of Pedda Bala Siksha. Recently Gajula Satyanarayana, a popular writer, has released his own edition.
