= Moses Nagari =

Moses Nagari or Moses ben Judah (in Hebrew, Moshe ben Yehuda ha-Nagari) was a medieval Jewish philosopher and writer. According to Steinschneider, he lived at Rome, Italy about 1300, and his name should be read "Na'ar", part of the Ne'arim family ("Adolescentoli"). Moses wrote Ma'amar ba-Ma'areket, an index to Maimonides' Moreh Nebukim, and explanations of philosophical terms, printed, together with Saul Cohen's philosophical questions on the "Moreh" addressed to Isaac Abravanel, at Venice in 1574. This being considered a fragment of a collective work on the Moreh, it was erroneously called Qetzat Bi'ure ha-Moreh.

Steinschneider has pointed out the mistakes made concerning this author. Dukes in Allg. Zeit. des Jud. 1840, p. 156, corrupts his name into "Nagara," and in "Orient, Lit." 1845, p. 617, into "Najara." Wolf in Bibl. Hebr. i. 852, No. 1562, calls him "Moses ben Judah Nigdi," but ib. iii. 758, No. 1562, "Nagara" and "Nagari." 1b. iii. 795, No. 1610, he confounds him with Moses ben Levi Najara, as does Fürst in "Bibl. Jud." iii. 13; and both erroneously ascribe to him Moses ben Levi's work Lekhah Tov.
