= Encyclopædia Americana (19th century) =

The Encyclopædia Americana was a general-knowledge English-language encyclopedia. It was published in the United States beginning in the late 1820s and continued with new editions and supplements into the 1850s. Other than its name, it had no connection with the more well-known Encyclopedia Americana, which was first published in 1902.

The Americana was the first full-sized encyclopedia of American authorship.

== History ==
The Encyclopædia Americana was founded by German-born Francis Lieber; he presented the idea of an American encyclopedia based on Friedrich Brockhaus' Conversations-Lexikon to publishers Carey, Lea & Carey of Philadelphia in January 1828. Lieber explained that this work would not be simply a translation of the Conversations-Lexikon, but rather a distinctively American encyclopedia, omitting much of the European matter. The publishers were not receptive to the idea at first, but Lieber had made numerous contacts with American intellectuals who helped convince the publishers to commit to the project. Several weeks later, they agreed to publish the Americana; however, instead of being granted a royalty on sets sold, he would be paid $20,000 in installments (minus editorial costs). This payment, while seen as fair for the time, ended up leaving Lieber in straitened circumstances after the work was done.

Assisted by Edward Wigglesworth, a recent graduate of Harvard University, Lieber set to work. When it was clear that they could not keep to their scheduled output of a volume every three months, Thomas Gamaliel Bradford joined the editorial team. The editors offered fifty cents per German page to translators of the Conversations-Lexicon, while creators of new articles would receive one dollar per page; this was the same rate set by the North American Review.

== Notable contributors ==
- Joseph Bonaparte, former king of Naples and Spain and older brother of Napoleon Bonaparte, contributed to the Americana; his contributions on French topics include a 25,000-word biography on the former emperor of France, which was the encyclopedia's longest biographical article.
- Supreme Court Justice Joseph Story provided around twenty articles on legal topics, including "Common Law", "Contract", "Corpus delicti", "Courts of England and the United States", "Criminal Law", "Equity", "Evidence", "Jury", "Law", "Natural Law", and "Usury".
- Judge John Pickering wrote "Agrarian Law", "Americanism", "Indian Languages", and part of "Accents".
- John Davidson Godman had agreed to contribute articles on natural history, but was unable to finish them before his death from tuberculosis in 1830.

== First edition ==
The first volume was published September 1829, at the price of $2.50, and quickly sold out. When completed in 1833, the first edition comprised 13 volumes. Despite the success of the Americana, the Panic of 1837 led Carey, Lea, and Carey to scale back their catalog and concentrate on medical works. Nevertheless, this work continued to return profits to its owners on a regular basis. Publishing houses across the United States, and even in Canada, would rent or purchase Carey stereotype plates and publish Encyclopedia editions with their own imprints at the foot of the title pages, while retaining the Carey copyright notes on the overleaf, through 1858. In 1846, a supplementary fourteenth volume was issued.

== Impact on the California Gold Rush ==
In 1848, John Sutter read the encyclopedia's article on "Gold" as part of his efforts to verify the authenticity of the gold found in his mill, a discovery that would start the California Gold Rush.
