= Barkham Burroughs' Encyclopaedia =

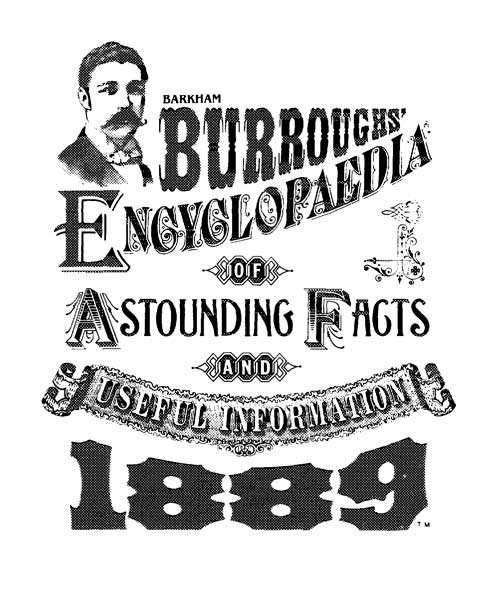
Cover of Barkham Burroughs' Encyclopedia, 1889.

Barkham Burroughs' Encyclopaedia of Astounding Facts and Useful Information is an encyclopedia and miscellany first published in 1889 by Barkham Burroughs.

== Background ==
Barkham Burroughs was reportedly a rear admiral in the United States Navy during the Benjamin Harrison administration. He was also reputed to have invented the return address in the United States. He died in 1952.

== Contents ==
The book has a particular focus on etiquette. It also contains home remedies and recipes.

== Publication history ==
The work was originally published in 1889. It was reprinted in 1983 by Miggs Burroughs, Barkham Burroughs's grandson.
