= Minor Encyclopedia =

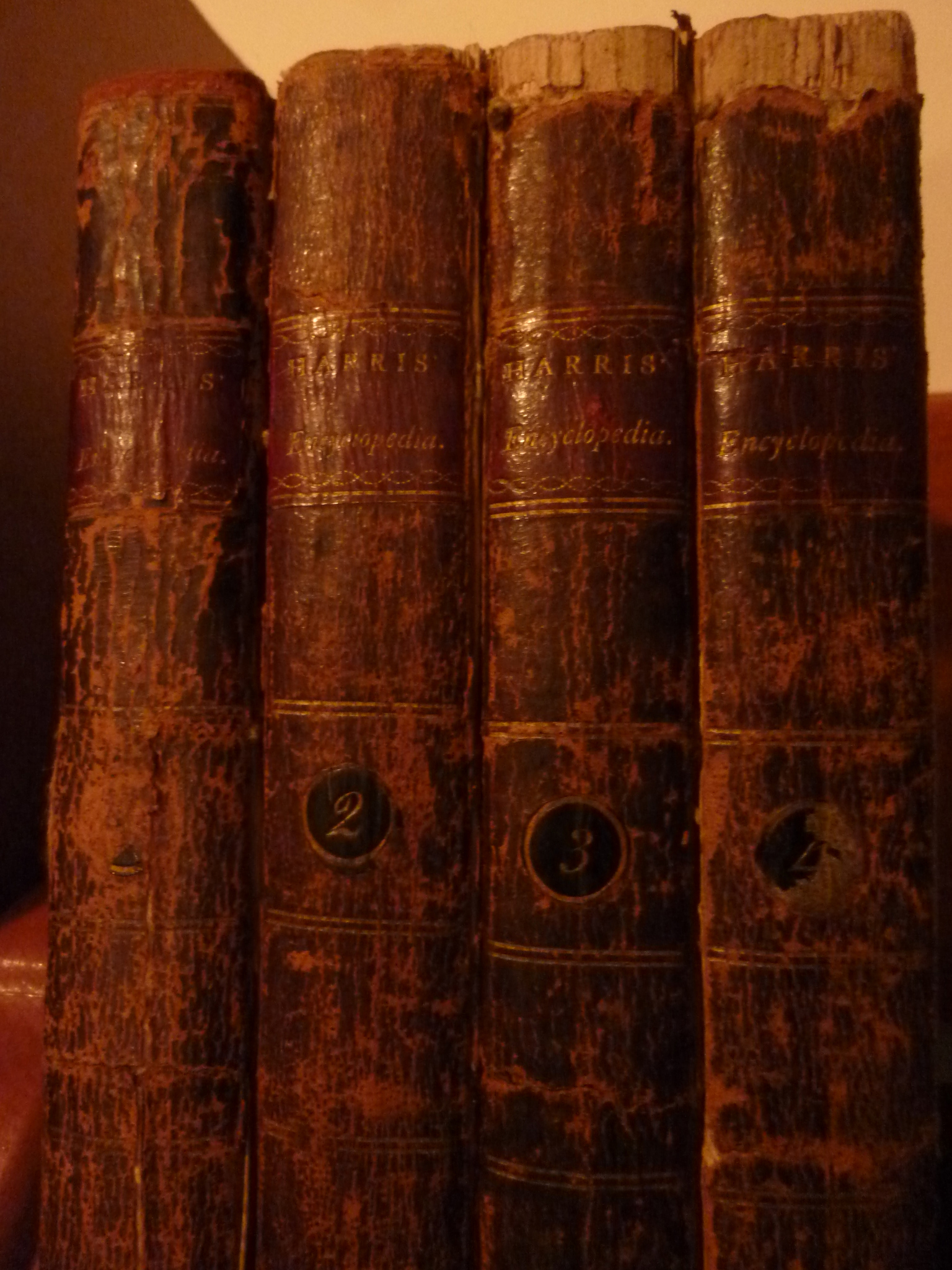
Harris' Minor Encyclopedia, 1803

Harris' Minor Encyclopedia is a small encyclopedia compiled by the Rev. Thaddeus Mason Harris in 1803 in Dorchester, Massachusetts, and published that year in Boston by West and Greenleaf. The full title on the title page is The Minor Encyclopedia, or Cabinet of General Knowledge: Being a Dictionary of Arts, Sciences and Polite Literature. In Four Volumes.

The book was a revised American edition of Kendall's Pocket Encyclopedia, edited extensively by Harris. It consists of four volumes of approximately 300 pages each in duodecimo (4 1/2 inches by 7 inches). There are no plates.

Harris covers the arts and sciences, and technology, and topics of general knowledge, but there are no geographical, biographical, or historical articles. The editor states, "Articles of local geography have been purposely omitted. The publications of Dr. Morse supersede the necessity of their introduction here...Biographical dictionaries, particularly those of Watkins and Jones, are in general circulation; and the public are expecting an elaborate and complete "Universal Biography", compiled by a Society of Literati in Albany. Nor was it possible to make these volumes the vehicle of HISTORICAL INFORMATION. It is a subject too extensive for our plan."

== See also ==
- Encyclopedists
- Reference work
- List of historical encyclopedias
