= Anthony Florian Madinger Willich =

Anthony Florian Madinger Willich (died February 1804) was a German medical writer.

He specialized in diet, nutrition and other aspects of personal medicine.

== Life ==
He was born at Rössel, Ermland, East Prussia (now Reszel, Kętrzyn County, Warmia, Poland). He lived in London for a period of time and was admitted as a Freemason in 1800 while living in Paddington, London. He died in 1804 in Kharkiv.

== Career ==
He was a contemporary of Johann Christoph Adelung, with whom he frequently collaborated.

He is most famous for being the author of the Domestic Encyclopedia.

== Bibliography ==
Some of his books and papers are:

- Elements of the critical philosophy
- Lectures on Diet and Regimen
- Three Philological Essays
- The Domestic Encyclopaedia
