= Saunier =

Saunier is a French surname. Notable people with the surname include:

- Greg Saunier (born 1969), American drummer for the band Deerhoof
- Matthieu Saunier (born 1990), French footballer
- Pierre-Paul Saunier (1751–1818), French gardener and explorer

== See also ==
- Lons-le-Saunier, French commune
