= Otto Lueger =

German engineer (1843–1911)

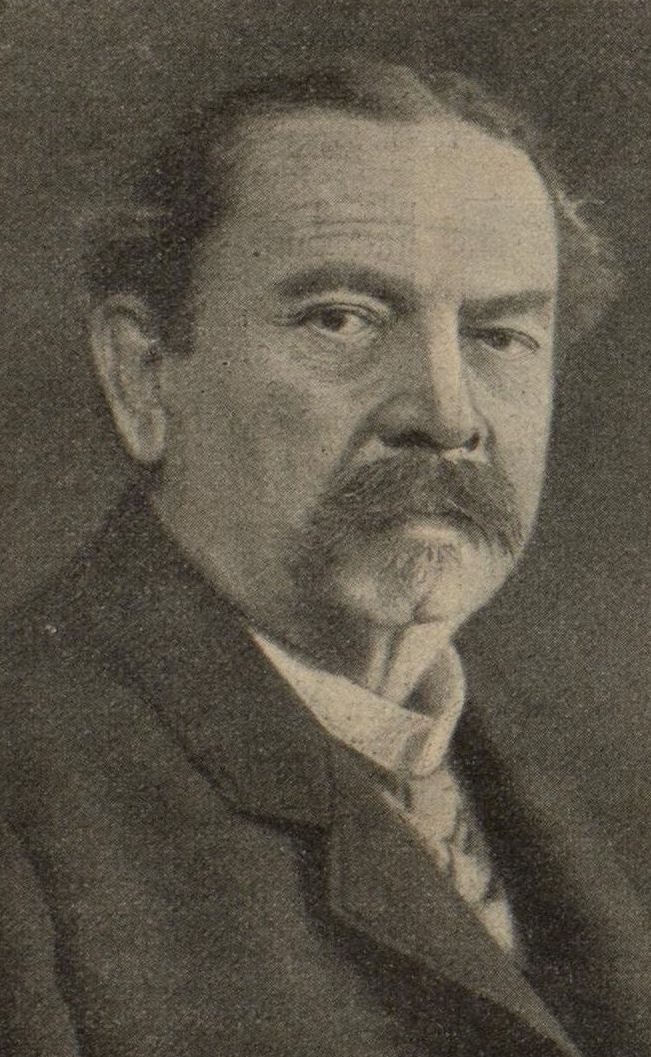
- Born: 13 October 1843
- Died: 2 May 1911 (aged 67)
- Occupation: Engineer

Otto Lueger (b. 13 October 1843 in Tengen, Grand Duchy of Baden; d. 2 May 1911 in Stuttgart) was a German civil engineer, university professor, and author of the Lexikon der gesamten Technik ("Encyclopedia of Technology").

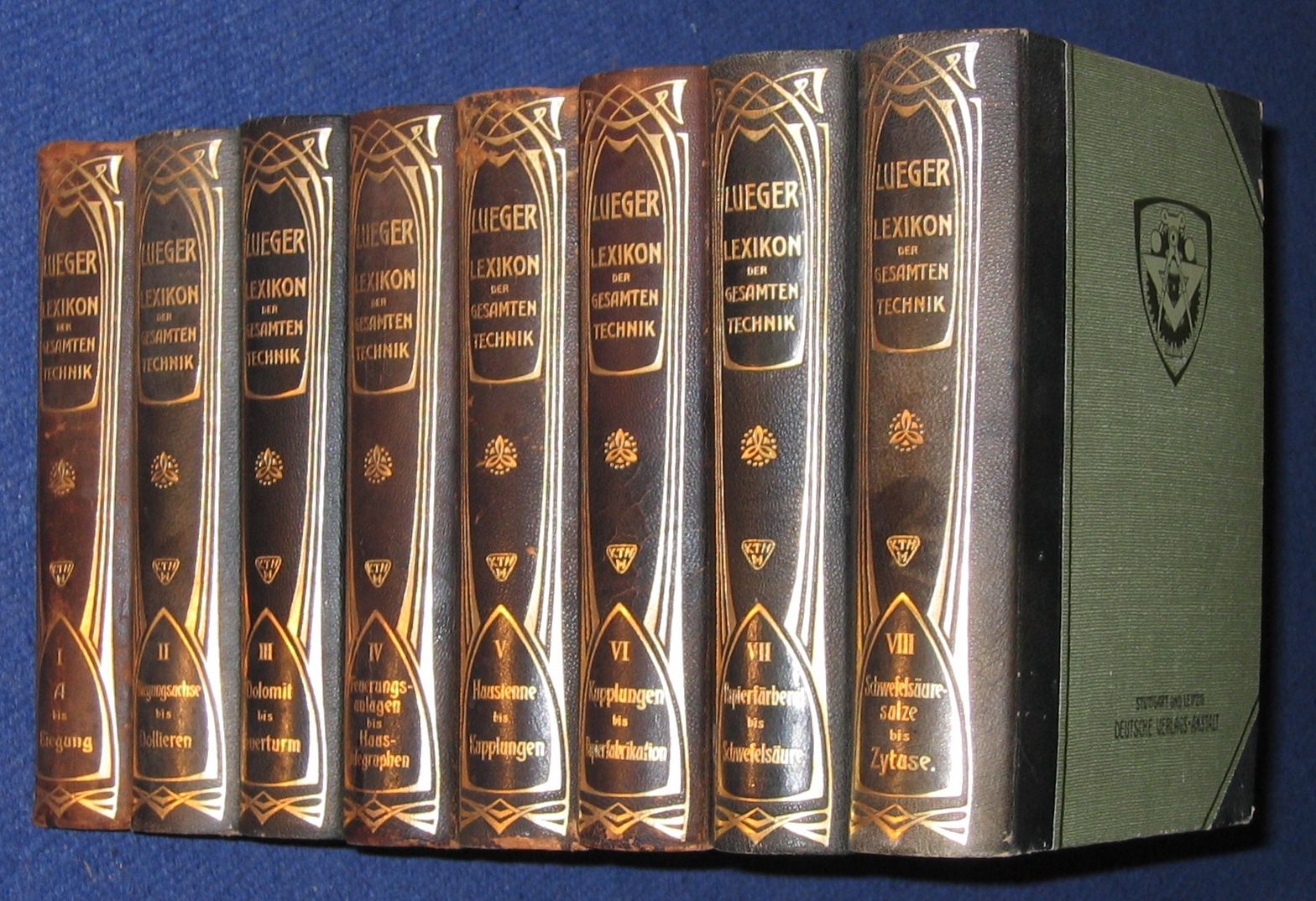
Lexikon der gesamten Technik, Second Edition, 1904

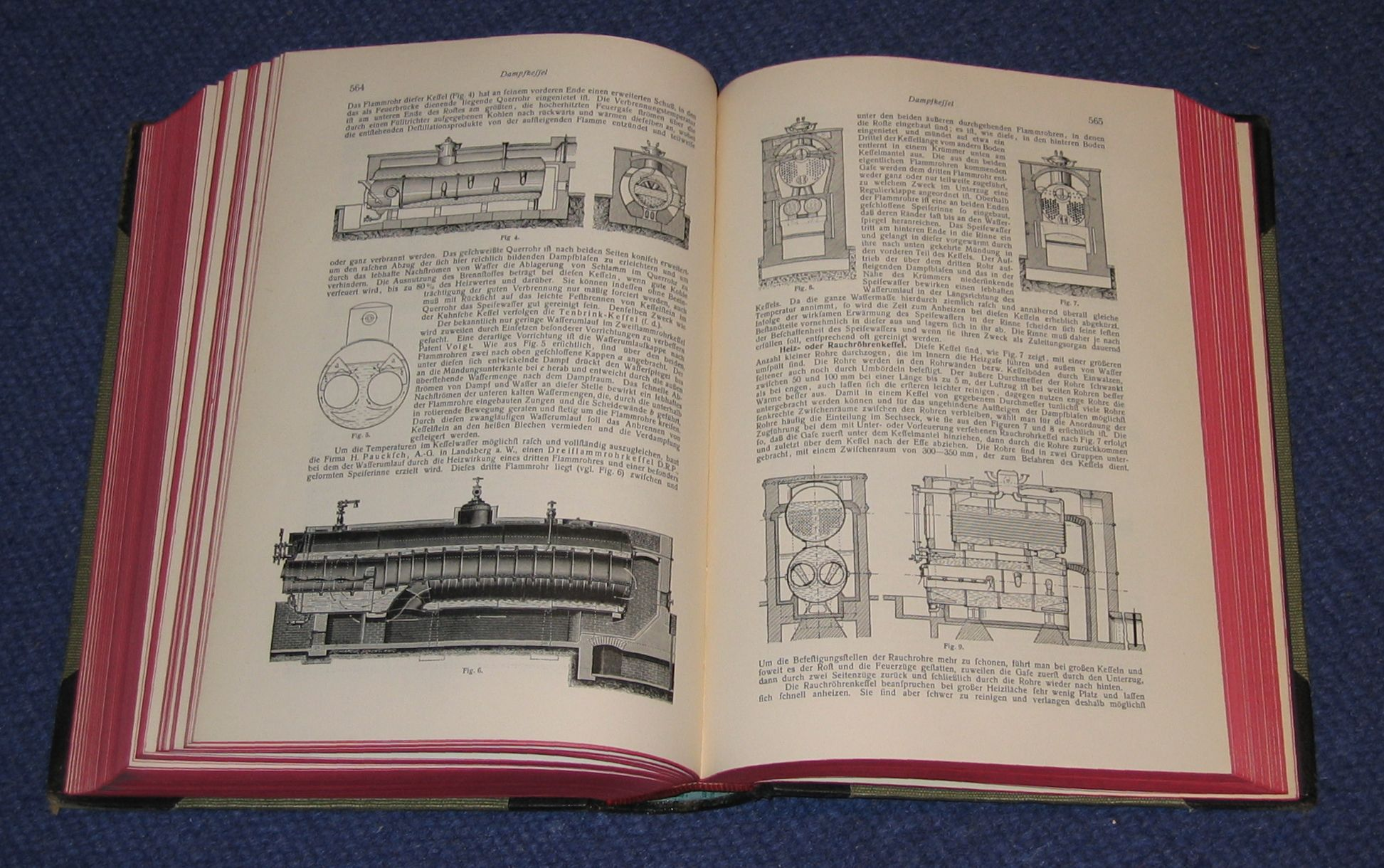
"Steam boiler", Lexikon der gesamten Technik, Second Edition, 1904

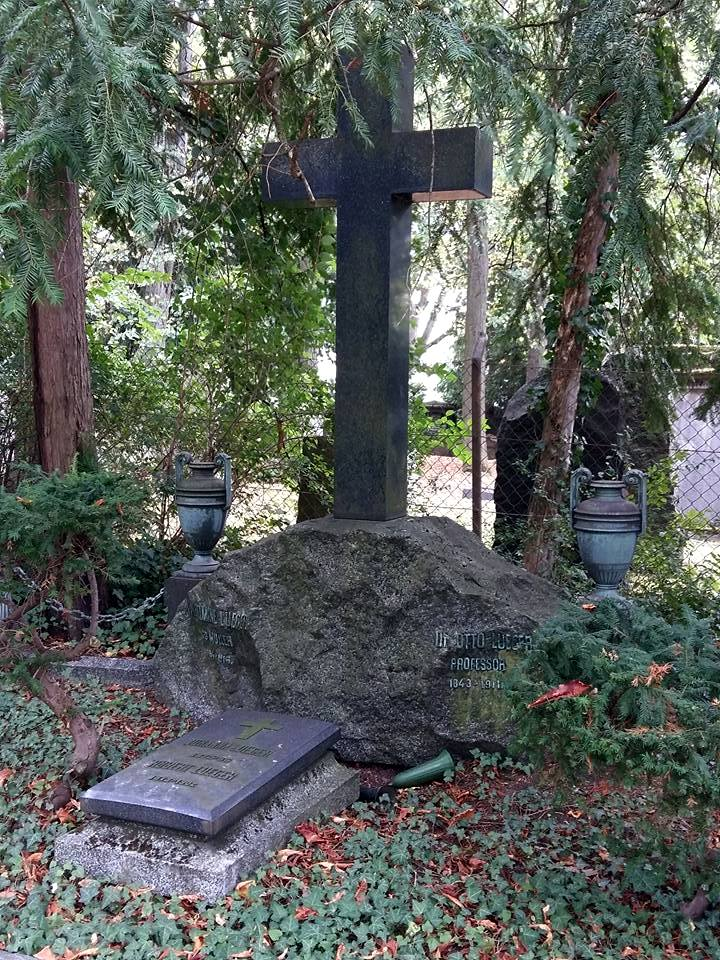
Grave at the Pragfriedhof in Stuttgart

Lueger studied at the Karlsruhe Polytechnic, where he was a member of the student corps, the Corps Saxonia. He then traveled in Europe for study purposes. From 1866 he worked at the waterworks in Karlsruhe, from 1871 at those in Frankfurt am Main. From 1874 he headed the Frankfurt Civil Engineering Office, and later that of Freiburg im Breisgau.

From 1878 he worked as a freelance engineer in Stuttgart and built mainly waterworks, in Baden-Baden, Freiburg im Breisgau, Pforzheim and Lahr amongst others.

In recognition of his scientific and practical achievements in the field of water supply Lueger was awarded an honorary doctorate from the University of Halle-Wittenberg in 1894.

From 1895 he was an associate professor, from 1903 full professor of Hydraulic Engineering at the Technical University of Stuttgart. Lueger was the first editor of the Lexikon der gesamten Technik, an encyclopedia of technology, which appeared in several editions.

He is buried at the Pragfriedhof cemetery in Stuttgart.
