= Cyclopedia of Universal History =

Encyclopedia by John Clark Ridpath

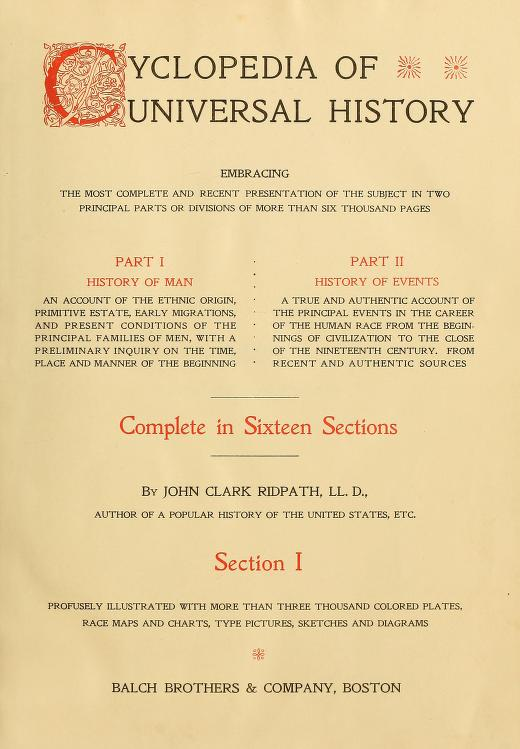
- Author: John Clark Ridpath
- Genre: Encyclopedia
- No. of books: 4

The Cyclopedia of Universal History was an encyclopedia of world history (universal history) authored by John Clark Ridpath. The book was produced, initially in 3 volumes, from 1880 to 1884 and was copiously illustrated in black and white, and then expanded to four volumes in 1890 to include a comprehensive account of the events of the nineteenth century up to that time. It also became the prototype for his later History of the World (8 volumes, 1894) and Universal History (16 volumes, 1895). The latter comprises his four-volume work, Great Races of Mankind (1894), which was dedicated to his wife, and was his last major work, having devoted ten years researching and four years writing.

== Notes ==
Volume	Contents
Part I. History of Man
Volume 1	I. Time and place of the beginning. II. Manner of the beginning. III. Primeval Man.
Volume 2	IV. Distribution of the species. V. The Iranians. VI. The Indicans.
Volume 3	VII. The Greeks. VIII. The Romans.
Volume 4	IX. The Latin Races. X. The Celts. XI. The Teutonic peoples.
Volume 5	XII. The Norse Races. XIII. The Slavs. XXIV. The Armaeans. XXV. The Hebrews. XXIV. Canaanites and Syrians.
Volume 6	XVII. The Arabs; XVIII. The Hamites. XIX. The Thibetans and Burmese. XX. The Indo-Chinese. XXI. The Malays
Volume 7	XXII. The Chinese. XXIII. The Japanese. XXIV. The Mongols proper. XXV. Northern Asiatics
Volume 8	XXVI. Sawaioris and Tarapons. XXVII. Northern Aborigines. XXVIII. Central and South Americans. XXVIX. African Nigritians. XXX. Australians and Papuans.
Part II. Events of Man
Volume 9	I. Egypt. II. Chaldea. III. Assyria. IV. Media. V. Babylonia. VI. Persia.
Volume 10	VII. Parthia. VIII. Greece. IX. Macedonia.
Volume 11	Rome. The Country - The people - Arts and learning - Manners and Customs - Religion - Legends and Traditions - Early Annals - Conquest of Italy - Punic Wars - Imperial republic - The First Cesars - Nerva to Antoninus - Age of the Antonines - Diocletian - Constantine and successors - Age of Justinian - The oconoclsts - The Macedonian Dynasty - Age of the Comneni - The Latin Dynasty - The Palaeologi
Volume 12	XI. Barbarian Ascendancy. XII. Mohamedan Ascendancy. XIII. Age of Charlemagne. XIV. Feudal Ascendancy. XV. The Crusades.
Volume 13	The Free Cities - France in the 14th-15th centuries - Germany in the 14th-15th centuries - England in the 14th-15th centuries - Spain, Italy and Northern Europe - Land Ho! - The Reformation proper - Charles, Henry and Francis - The reformation in England - Last half of the 16th century - Thirty Years' War - Colonization of America.
Volume 14	XVIII. The English Revolution. XIX. Age of Frederick the Great. XX. The Age of Revolution.
Volume 15	America; XXII. American Middle Ages. XXIII. Mexican war and 6th decade. XXIV. Disunion and Civil War. XXV. Epoch of Reconstruction. XXVI. Latest Period. BRITAIN; XXVII. Last Two Hanoverians. XXVIII. Epoch of Chartism. XXIX. From Hyde Park to Bosphorus. XXX. Sepoy Rebellion. XXXI. Suffrage reform and American complications. XXXII. Fenianism and Disestablishment. XXXIII. Reforms of the 8th decade. XXXIV. Battle for Home Rule.
Volume 16	XXIII. France. XXIV. Germany. XXV. Italy. XXVI.Eastern Europe. XXVII. Minor American States. XXVIII. Oriental Nations.
