= Domestic Encyclopedia =

The Domestic Encyclopaedia; or, A dictionary of facts, and useful knowledge: comprehending a concise view of the latest discoveries, inventions, and improvements, chiefly applicable to rural and domestic economy is a small encyclopedia of the English language, in four volumes, published in London in 1802 by Murray and Highley, and compiled by Anthony Florian Madinger Willich. While most encyclopedias of the time, such as Encyclopædia Britannica, were printed in quarto, or in the case of Chambers Cyclopædia, even folio, the Domestic Encyclopedia was printed in octavo, 5 1/2 by 8 1/2 inches. There are roughly 500 pages per volume, and 28 plates in total. Volume 4 includes a 70-page supplement and a 33-page index. The subject matter of the encyclopedia centers around domestic and agricultural information, during a time when most people were farmers. Most of the plates show farm equipment.

An American edition was expanded to 5 volumes octavo by James Mease and published in 1803 in Philadelphia by W. Y. Birch and Abraham Small. Roughly 500 pages per volume, and 35 plates total.

A second American edition was condensed to 3 volumes octavo by Thomas Cooper and published in 1821 in Philadelphia by Abraham Small. Roughly 600 pages per volume.

== See also ==
- Encyclopedia
- Encyclopedists
- List of historical encyclopedias
