= Kendall's Pocket Encyclopedia =

1802 book

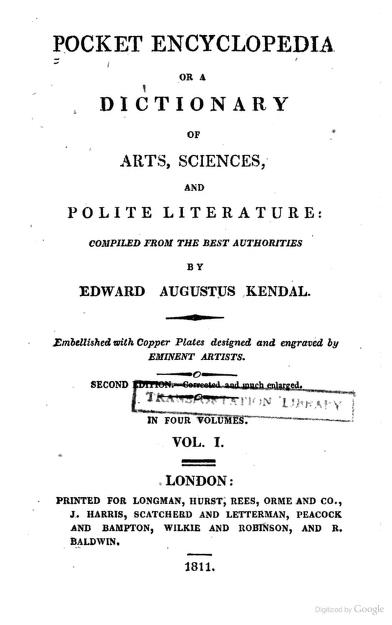
- Title page of the second edition published in 1811
- Author: Edward Augustus Kendall
- Language: English
- Genre: Reference
- Publisher: W. Peacock and Sons
- Publication date: 1802
- Publication place: United Kingdom

Kendall's Pocket Encyclopedia was written by Edward Augustus Kendall and printed in London in 1802 by W. Peacock and Sons, with a second edition in 1811.

The full title is "A Pocket Encyclopedia; Or, Library of General Knowledge, Being a Dictionary of Arts, Sciences, and Polite Literature". It is made up of six very small volumes in a choice of 12mo, 18mo or 24mo (5 3/8" tall), and retailed at 18s.

The encyclopedia begins with "Abbe, a French word literally meaning an abbot" and ends with "Zootomy, the art or act of dissecting animals or living creatures."

A new edition of the Pocket Encyclopedia was compiled by minister and writer Jeremiah Joyce, and published as a "corrected and enlarged" edition in 1811. The new edition was published in four thicker 12mo volumes, and sold for £1 4s.

== Legacy ==
An 1803 American version, Harris' Minor Encyclopedia, was edited and enlarged by the Rev. Thaddeus Mason Harris.

A German version, Brockhaus' Taschen-Encyklopädie (Pocket Encyclopedia), was published between 1816 and 1820.
