= Lexikon der gesamten Technik =

German-language encyclopedia of technology

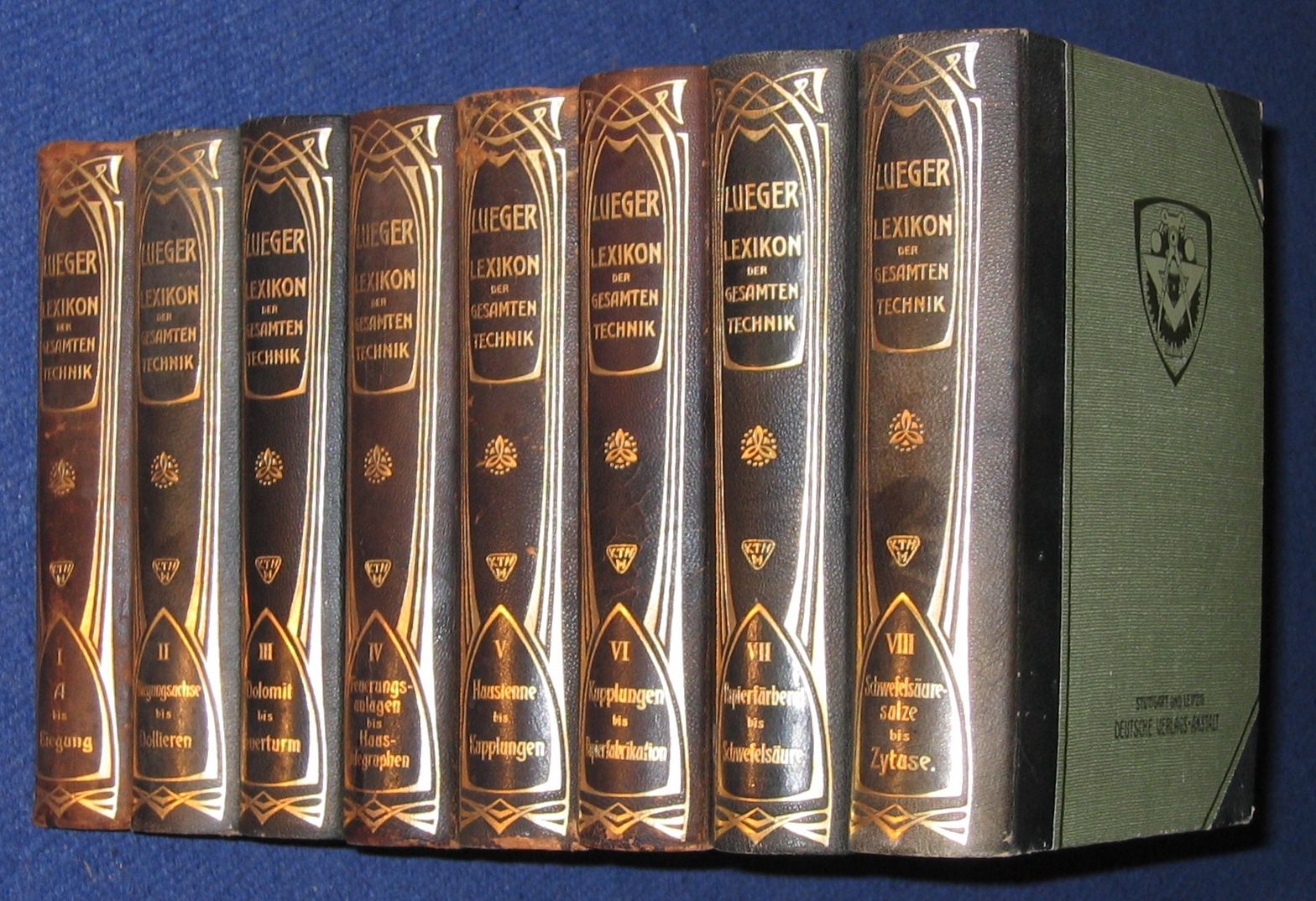
Lexikon der gesamten Technik, 2nd edition 1904

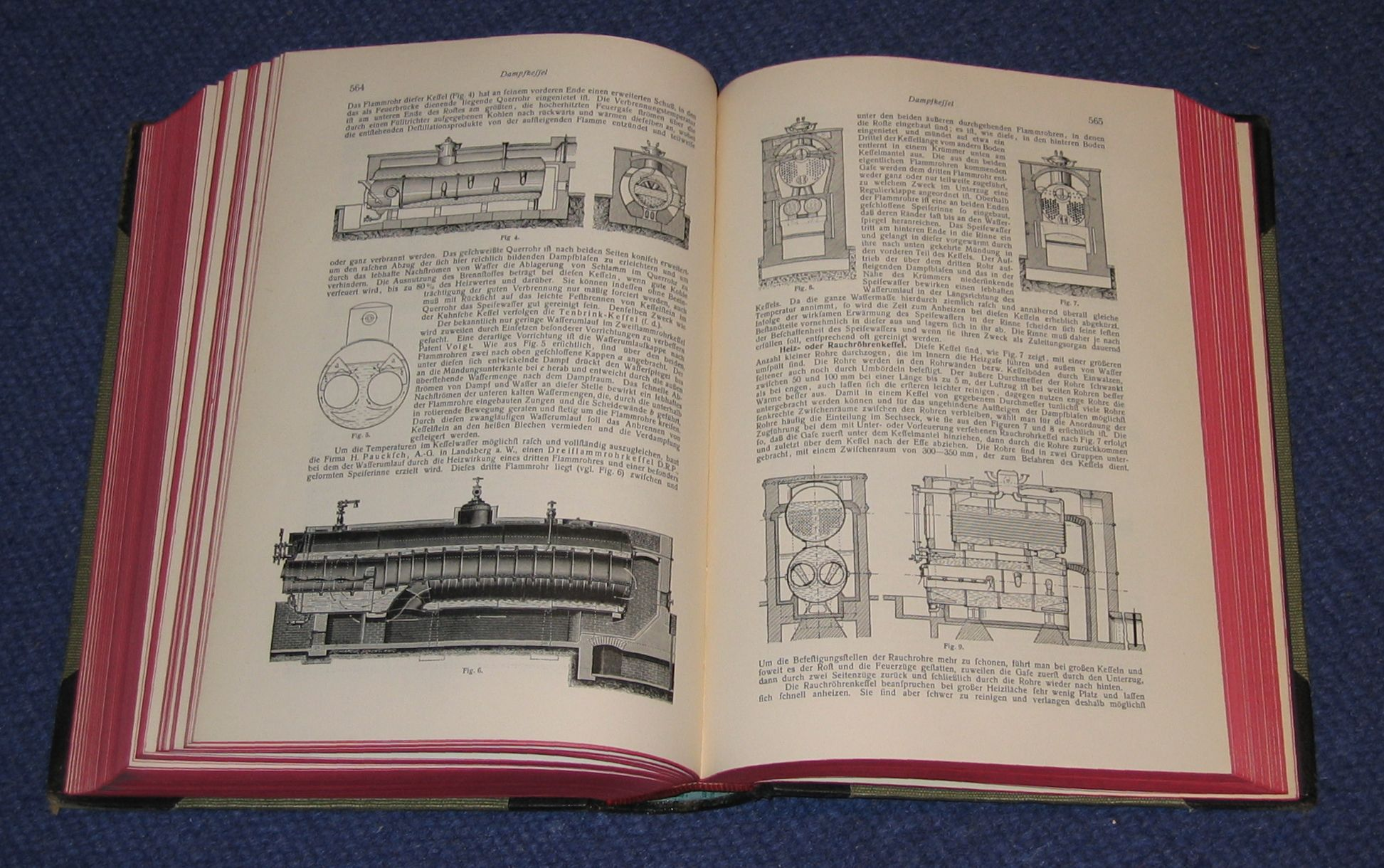
Lexikon der gesamten Technik, 2nd edition 1904

The Lexikon der gesamten Technik ("encyclopedia of all technology") is an illustrated German-language encyclopedia of architectural, engineering and manufacturing technology, written by Otto Lueger (German engineer, 1843–1911) and first published in 1894.

== Editions ==
- 1st Edition, 7 volumes, 1894–1899
- 2nd Edition, 8 volumes, 1904–1910 (with two supplements in 1914 and 1920)
- 3rd Edition, 6 volumes, 1926–1929 (with a separate index volume)
- 4th Edition, 17 volumes, 1960–1972
