= Pantologia =

1813 encyclopedia

Pantologia is an English encyclopedia, published in 12 volumes, 8vo in 1813, with 370 plates (some coloured). Its full title page was A New Cyclopedia, comprehending a complete series of Essays, Treatises and Systems, alphabetically arranged, with a general dictionary of Arts, Sciences and Words: the whole representing a distinct Survey of Human Genius, Learning and Industry, illustrated with elegant engravings; those on Natural History being from original drawings by Edwards and others, and beautifully coloured after nature ...

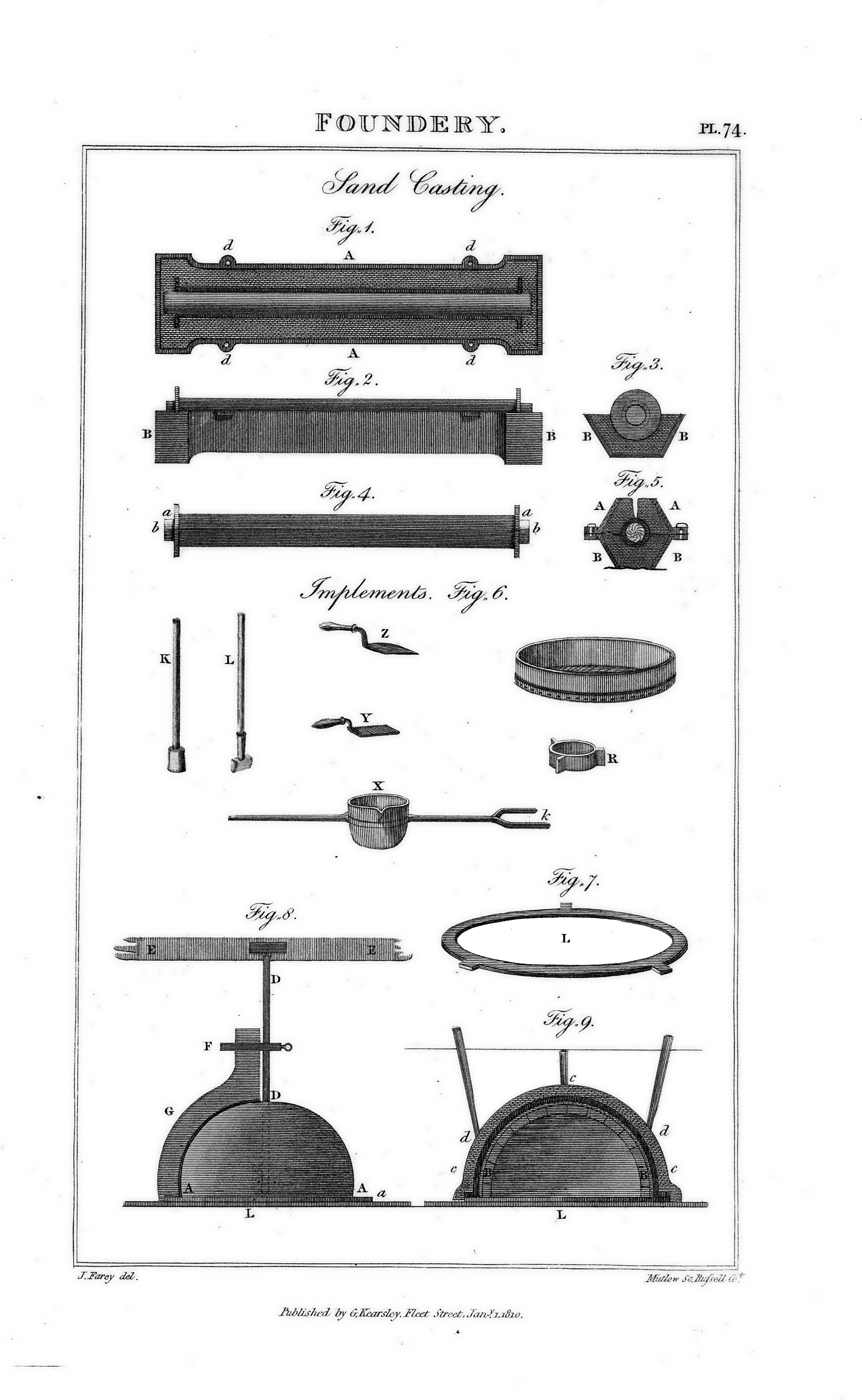
Sand casting

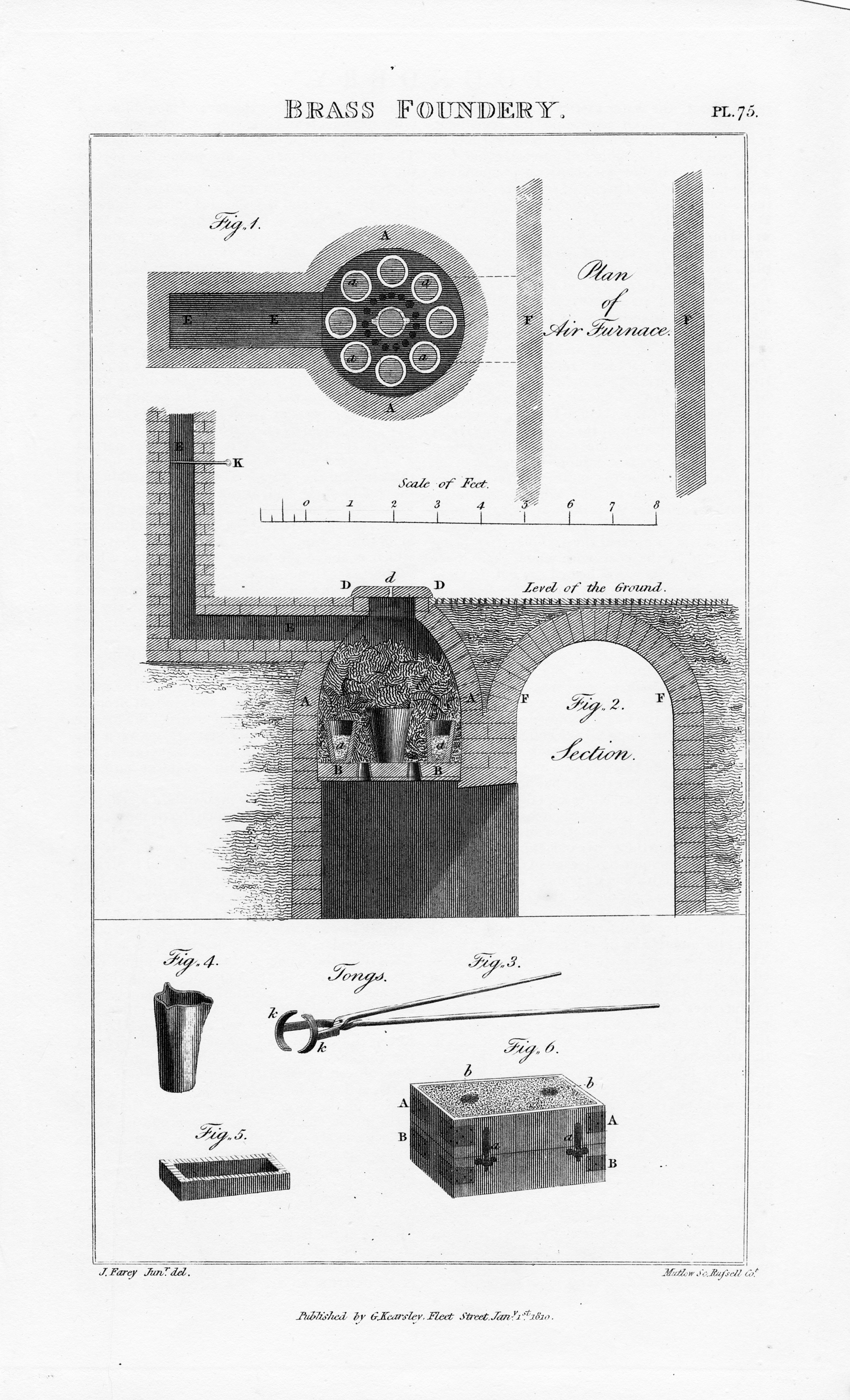
Brass foundry

== History and editorship ==
The editors were John Mason Good, Olinthus Gregory, and Newton Bosworth, as well as other anonymous writers. Work had begun in 1802, by Gregory and Bosworth and an anonymous writer, who gave up after about a year. They were later joined by Good. The preface lists the subjects for which each editor was responsible. The appearance of rival works held up publication for some years. The work was published serially, and the dates on the plates indicate the first sections were published in 1808.

191 of the plates related to natural history, and the balance to miscellaneous subjects. A number of the latter, dealing with manufacture and inventions, were drawn by John Farey, Jr., and engraved by Wilson Lowry. The natural history drawings were mainly by Sydenham Edwards. A feature of the plates relating to engineering and manufacture was the use by Farey of the drawings of John Smeaton as the basis for his work.

== Seven advantages over rivals ==
The editors claimed in the preface [ix] that the work had seven advantages over its rivals:

- It explained English words as well as those of the arts and sciences, so avoiding the need to have a separate dictionary.
- It appended English names to the Linneian ones in the natural history section, so helping non-scientific readers.
- It had a more up to date arrangement of mineralogy, reflecting modern concepts of the field.
- References were given at the ends of the more important articles.
- The natural history plates were coloured.
- To permit the greatest amount of text to be included, longer articles were in small print.
- It included accounts of sports, games, recreations and pastimes, including the rules by which they were conducted.
