= Encyclopædia Perthensis =

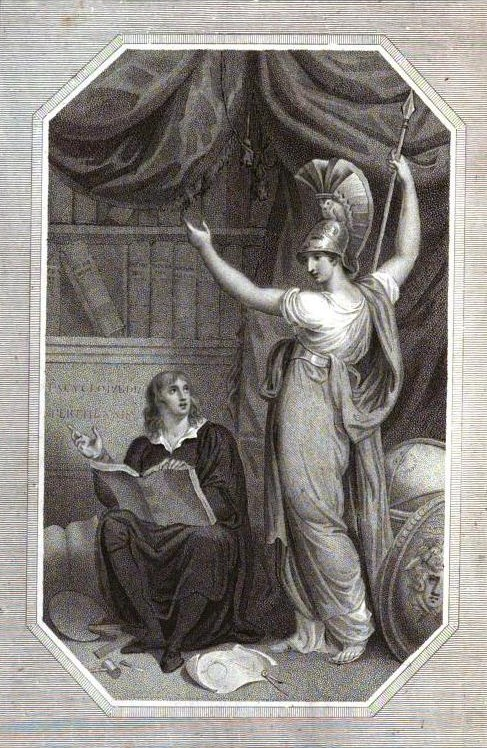
Minerva directing study to the attainment of Universal Knowledge, frontispiece to Encyclopaedia Perthensis, second edition 1816

The Encyclopædia Perthensis was a publishing project around the Morison Press in Perth, Scotland undertaken in the 1790s, with the involvement of James Morison. Morison went into partnership with Colin Mitchel and Co.

== Editions ==
The Encyclopædia was issued in weekly instalments from 1796 to 1806, then republished in a 23 volume set in 1806. The first edition had the subtitle "Universal dictionary of knowledge, collected from every source and intended to supersede the use of all other English books of reference."

Like the first edition, the second was originally issued in weekly instalments. These were issued from 1807 to 1816. In the last year the encyclopaedia was issued as a 24 volume set, with the last volume being a supplement to the original text. The subtitle was changed to "Universal dictionary of the arts, sciences, literature, &c. intended to supersede the use of other books of reference."

== Content ==
Most of the text was taken verbatim from the third edition of Encyclopædia Britannica. The first edition includes a rare early plan of Washington, D.C. It had twenty-three 8vo volumes with plates and maps. The main contributor and editor was Alexander Aitchison, member of the Royal Physical Society of Edinburgh.

The majority of the 370 plates and maps claimed by the second edition, where credited, are signed T Clerk Sculpt. Edinr. Two other artists, J Stewart and J Frasier, have signed plates. Though 370 plates and maps are claimed on the title pages, there are only directions for the placement of 348 plates, of which only one could be described as a map, a plan of Washington, D.C., in 1800 by Andrew Ellicott.
