= The Engineer's and Mechanic's Encyclopaedia =

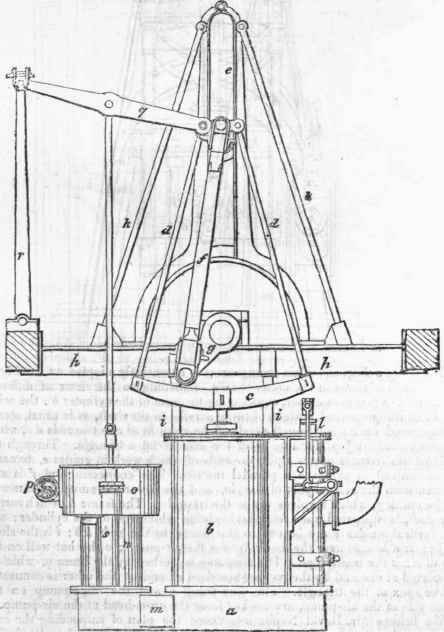
Steeple engine for steamboats

The Engineer's and Mechanic's Encyclopaedia is a book edited by Luke Hebert, a Birmingham patent agent and journalist, and published by Thomas Kelly of Paternoster Row. The first edition appeared in 1836 and 1837. The second edition appeared in 1849. It was in two octavo volumes (Vol. 1, 796 pp and vol. 2, 928 pp), illustrated with woodcuts in the text and a number of full page engravings.

Many of the articles relate to specific processes and machines, and overall the encyclopaedia is not over-concerned with the theoretical aspects. Of particular value are the monograph-length accounts of the progress of rail transport and steamboats.
