= Encyclopédie nouvelle =

French-language political reference work published 1834-47

The Encyclopédie nouvelle, ou dictionnaire philosophique, scientifique, littéraire et industriel, offrant le tableau des connaissances humaines au XIXe siècle (French pronunciation: [ɑ̃siklɔpedi nuvɛl]) was a French encyclopedia founded by Pierre Leroux and Jean Reynaud and published in installments from 1834 through 1847. It reflected the socialist philosophy of the founders.

Volume 1 (with an imprint of 1836, though the first installment appeared in 1834) covered A-Ari; volume 2, Ari-Bos; volume 3, Bot-Cons; volume 4, Const-Épic; and volume 8, Sap-Zor. Volumes 5 through 7 were never finished as planned, but materials issued in installments and intended for these volumes were eventually bound together in a miscellaneous volume covering the sequences Episc-Force and Organog-Phil.

== Bibliography ==
- Marisa Forcina, I diritti dell’esistente : la filosofia della "Encyclopédie nouvelle" (1833-1847), Lecce: Milella, 1987. ISBN 88-7048-138-7
