= Pierre Leroux =

French philosopher, political economist and encyclopedist

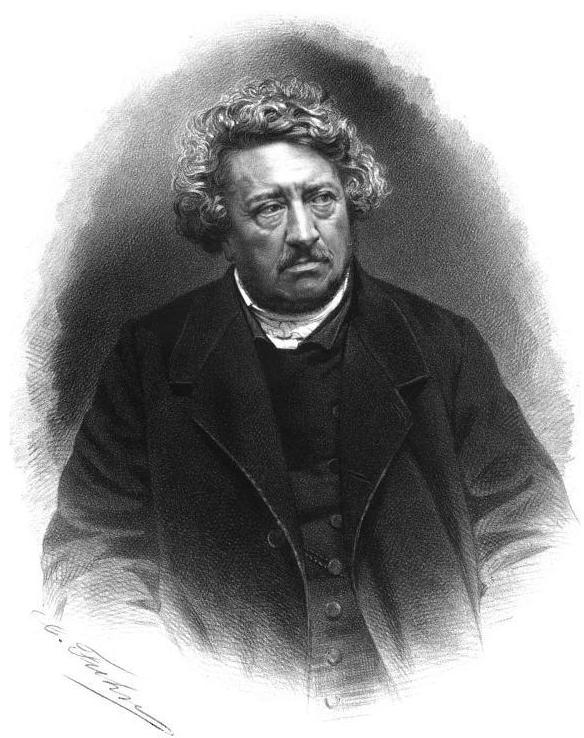
- Leroux in 1865
- Born: Pierre Henri Leroux; 7 April 1797; Paris, France
- Died: 12 April 1871 (aged 74); Paris Commune, France

Philosophical work
- Era: 19th-century philosophy
- Region: Western philosophy
- School: Saint-Simonianism; Socialism; Utopian socialism
- Notable ideas: "Socialism" (term)

Pierre Henri Leroux (French: [ləʁu]; 7 April 1797 – 12 April 1871) was a French philosopher and political economist.

== Life ==
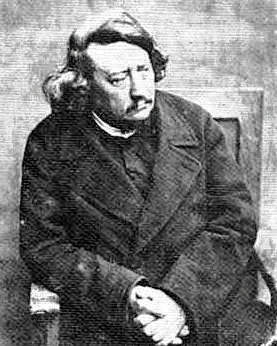
Pierre Leroux in exile, 1856

Leroux was born in Paris, the son of an artisan.

His education was interrupted by the death of his father, which compelled him to support his mother and family. Having worked first as a mason and then as a compositor, he joined Paul-François Dubois in the foundation of Le Globe which became in 1831 the official organ of the Saint-Simonian community, of which he became a prominent member. In November of the same year, when Prosper Enfantin became leader of the Saint-Simonians and preached the enfranchisement of women and the functions of the couple-prêtre, Leroux separated himself from the sect. In 1834, he published an essay entitled "Individualism and Socialism" ("De l’individualisme et du socialisme") which, despite its message of scepticism towards both tendencies, introduced the term "socialism" in French political discourse. In 1834, with Jean Reynaud, who had seceded with him, he founded the Encyclopédie nouvelle. Amongst the articles which he inserted in it were De l'égalité and Refutation de l'éclectisme, which afterwards appeared as separate works.

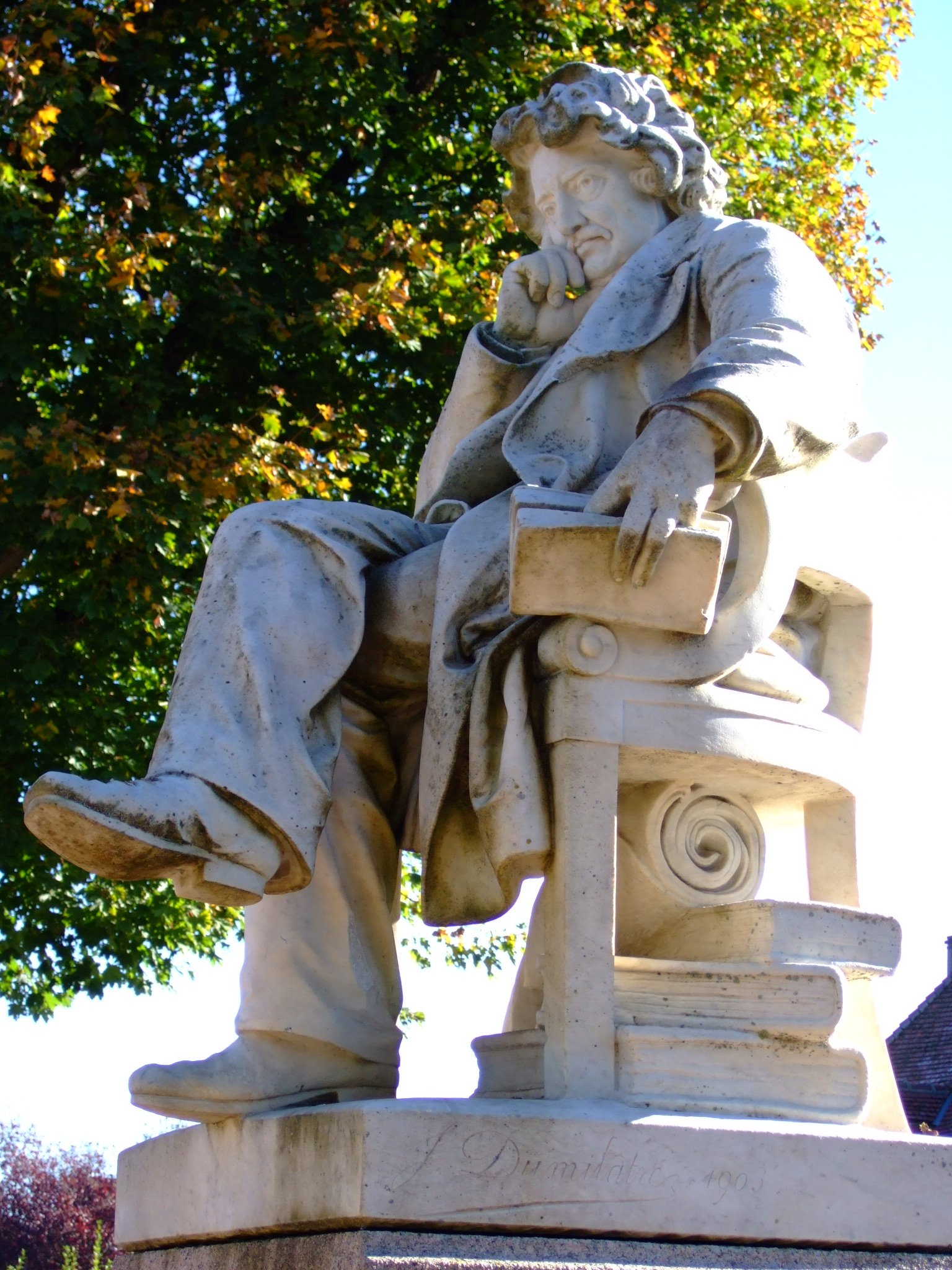
Statue of Pierre Leroux at Boussac

In 1840, he published his treatise De l'humanité (2nd ed. 1845), which contains the fullest exposition of his system, and was regarded as the philosophical manifesto of the Humanitarians. In 1841 he established the Revue indépendante, with the aid of George Sand, over whom he had great influence. Her Spiridion, which was dedicated to him, Sept cordes de la lyre, Consuelo, and La Comtesse de Rudolstadt, were written under the Humanitarian inspiration. Leroux also became embroiled in the philosophical controversy between F. W. J. Schelling and the Young Hegelians in the early 1840s. A favourable comment about Schelling prompted a public reply from Hegel's disciple Karl Rosenkranz.

In 1843, he established in Boussac, Creuse a printing association organized according to his systematic ideas, and founded the Revue sociale. At the outbreak of the Revolution of 1848 Leroux proclaimed the republic in the town of Boussac, becoming its mayor on February 25. Subsequently, he was elected to the Constituent Assembly, and in 1849 to the Legislative Assembly, where he sat with the radical socialist deputies and often spoke, though his speeches were criticised as abstract and mystical. Within the Assembly, Leroux represented the Seine Department.

An opponent of Louis Bonaparte, Leroux went into exile after the coup d'état of 1851, settling with his family in Jersey, where he pursued agricultural experiments and wrote his socialist poem La Grève de Samarez. Karl Marx nominated Leroux for the Central Committee of the International Workingmen's Association. On the definitive amnesty of 1869 he returned to Paris.

== Views ==
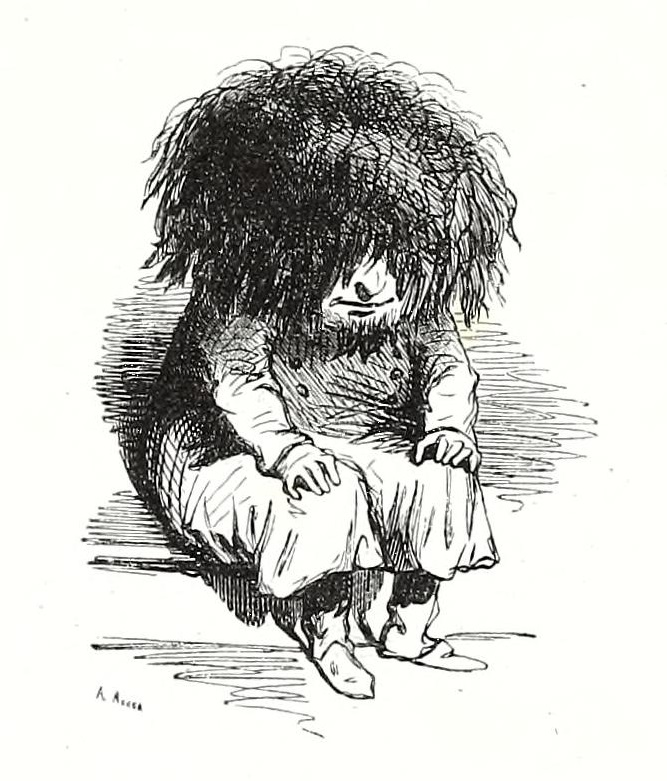
Caricature of Leroux in 1848–49 by Cham

Leroux's fundamental philosophical principle is what he calls the "triad"—a triplicity which he finds to pervade all things, which in God is "power, intelligence and love," in man "sensation, sentiment and knowledge".

Leroux was described as a Protestant. His religious doctrine is pantheistic; and, rejecting the belief in a future life as commonly conceived, he substitutes for it a theory of metempsychosis. In social economy he preserves the family, country and property, but finds in all three, as they now are, a despotism which must be eliminated. He imagines certain combinations by which this triple tyranny can be abolished. His solution seems to require the creation of families without heads, countries without governments and property without right of possession. In politics he advocates absolute equality—a democracy.

His views might be considered antisemitic in present times. Leroux believed that Jewish-controlled banks had replaced the social institution of the churches with modern values, of which he held a negative view: "We are destined to a future where individualism and egoism will triumph at the expense of the social good; the Jews, a people who epitomize individualism and egoism, are thus predestined to triumph over others." Leroux is highly critical of the modern capitalist economic system which he blames on Jews. According to Leroux, Jews, who had once crucified Jesus, were crucifying the Christian world with capitalist tyranny.

== See also ==
- Circulus (theory)
- French demonstration of 15 May 1848
- Liberté, égalité, fraternité
