= Circulus =

Circulus may refer to:

- Circulus (album), 1970, by Chick Corea
- Circulus (band), a British psychedelic folk and progressive rock band
- Circulus (gastropod), a genus of sea snails
- Circulus (theory), a socioeconomics doctrine
- Circulus (zoology), a type of reptilian social group
