= Jean Reynaud =

French philosopher (1806–1863)

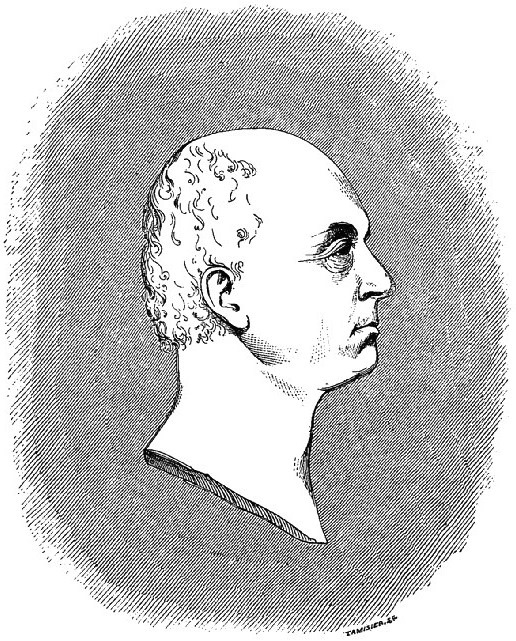
Portrait of Reynaud, engraving after a portrait by Madame Reynaud

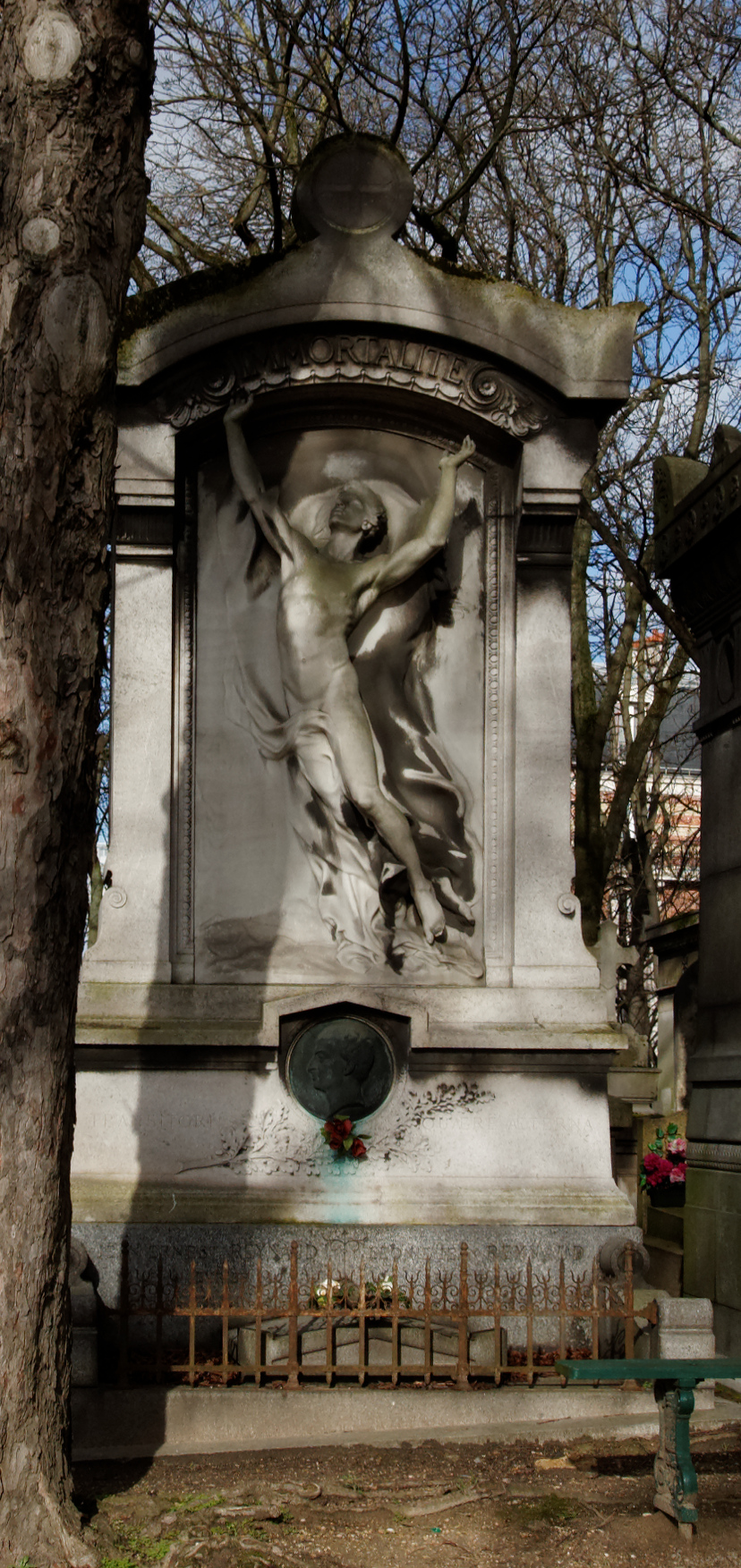
Reynaud's grave in Père Lachaise Cemetery, Paris, with sculpture by Henri Chapu

Jean Ernest Reynaud (French: [ʒɑ̃ ɛʁnɛst ʁɛno]; February 14, 1806 – July 28, 1863) was a French mining engineer and socialist philosopher.

He was a member of the Saint-Simonian community. He was a co-founder of the Encyclopédie nouvelle.

== Life ==
He was born in Lyon on 4 February 1806. He graduated from the Polytechnic School in Lyon in 1827 and joined the School of Mines. In May 1829 he began a four month study tour of Germany including the Harz Mountains, Black Forest, Saxony, Hanover, Oldenbourg and Westphalia. He then spent a further two months studying mines in Belgium and the Netherlands. He graduated from the mining school in 1830.

He was briefly imprisoned in the uprising of 1830. In 1854 he invented a new religious philosophy regarding the transmigration of souls which he saw as compatible both with traditional Christian views and modern ideas regarding reincarnation.

He died in Paris on 28 June 1863 and was buried there in Pere Lachaise Cemetery.

== Publications ==
- Minéralogie des Gens du Monde (1836)
- Histoire Élémentaire des Minéraux Usuels (1842)
- Terre et Ciel (1854)

== Sources ==
- David Albert Griffiths, Jean Reynaud, encyclopédiste de l’époque romantique, d’après sa correspondance inédite, Paris : M. Rivière, 1965.
