= Circulus (theory) =

Socioeconomics doctrine

Circulus was a socioeconomics doctrine devised by nineteenth-century French utopian socialist Pierre Leroux (1797–1871), who proposed that human excrement be collected by the state in the form of a tax and used as fertiliser, thereby increasing agricultural production sufficiently to prevent Malthusian catastrophe.

== The theory ==
According to Leroux, human excrement has remarkable fertilising properties, which society fails to harness. The human waste that is otherwise discarded would fertilise agricultural production sufficient to cover society's progressively increasing food consumption. Leroux posits the existence of a natural law dependent on the circulation of human excrement back through the agricultural process and which maintains a necessary balance between soil fertility and inexorable population growth. In the Revue de l'ordre social (No. 1, 1850, p. 6), Leroux responded to his critics, summing up his theory as follows: "Si les hommes étaient croyants, savants, religieux, ajoute-t-il, au lieu de rire, comme ils le font, du socialisme, ils professeraient avec respect et vénération la doctrine du circulus. Chacun recueillerait religieusement son fumier pour le donner à l'état, c'est-à-dire au percepteur, en guise d'impôt ou de contribution personelle. La production agricole serait immédiatement doublée, et la misère disparaîtrait du globe" (If men were believers, learned, religious, then, rather than laughing at socialism, as they do, they would profess the doctrine of circulus with respect and veneration. Each would religiously collect his dung to give it to the state, that is, to the tax-collector, by way of an impost or personal contribution. Agricultural production would instantly be doubled, and poverty would vanish from the globe).

== Origin and history of the theory ==
Leroux first put forward his theory of circulus in 1834, as part of an attempt to explain the failure of a Fourierist phalanstery. In response to Madame Baudet-Dulary, astonished at the failure of the utopian community established on her land, Fourier himself is supposed to have said: "Madame, donnez-moi du fumier" (Madame, give me dung). Despite public ridicule, Leroux held firm to his theory in the decades that followed and, while living in exile in Jersey after the fall of the Second Republic, he carried out experiments using his own excrement as fertiliser in an attempt to persuade the local authorities to adopt the doctrine of circulus. However, Leroux's theory did gain the sympathetic ear of fellow exile Victor Hugo. In the digression on the sewers of Paris in Les Misérables, Hugo would seem to have been influenced by Leroux's diagnosis of socio-economic ills when he declares that the present sewerage system is "a misunderstanding" ("Un égout est un malentendu"), a negligent waste ("coulage") of public wealth ("la richesse publique"), and that were the "givens of a new social economy" ("les données d'une économie sociale nouvelle") applied to human waste, then the problem of poverty would be attenuated. But in practical terms, rather than by Leroux's vision of individual members of society willingly paying a tax in their own excrement for the sake of the common weal, Hugo's collector sewers were sooner inspired by the ideas of English social reformer Edwin Chadwick, who proposed that human waste be pumped from cities to the countryside to provide fertiliser for crops to feed those very cities, thereby completing "the circle and [realising] the Egyptian type of eternity by bringing as it were the serpent's tail into the serpent's mouth".

== See also ==
- Reuse of human excreta
