= Paul-François Dubois =

Paul-François Dubois (1793 – 1874) was a French philosopher, an associate of Pierre Leroux, who helped establish Le Globe.
