= List of socialist states =

List of socialist states may refer to:

- List of non-communist socialist states, a list of states that have self-declared as socialist that are not also communist states
- List of communist states, a list of communist states that have self-designated as socialist or people's democracies
- Liberal democratic constitutions with references to socialism, liberal democratic states with references to socialism in their constitution
