= Socialism =

Political ideology emphasising social ownership of production

Socialism is an economic ideology and political philosophy encompassing diverse economic and social systems characterised by social ownership of the means of production, as opposed to private ownership. It describes the economic, political, and social theories and movements associated with the implementation of such systems. Social ownership can take various forms, including public, community, collective, cooperative, or employee. As one of the main ideologies on the political spectrum, socialism is the standard left-wing ideology in most countries. Types of socialism vary based on the role of markets and planning in resource allocation, and the structure of management in organizations.

Socialist systems are divided into non-market and market forms. A non-market socialist system seeks to eliminate the perceived inefficiencies, irrationalities, unpredictability, and crises that socialists traditionally associate with capital accumulation and the profit system. Market socialism retains the use of monetary prices, factor markets and sometimes the profit motive. As a political force, socialist parties and ideas exercise varying degrees of power and influence, heading national governments in several countries. Socialist politics have been internationalist and nationalist; organised through political parties and opposed to party politics; at times overlapping with trade unions and other times independent and critical of them, and present in industrialised and developing nations. Social democracy originated within the socialist movement, supporting economic and social interventions to promote social justice. While retaining socialism as a long-term goal, in the post-war period social democracy embraced a mixed economy based on Keynesianism within a predominantly developed capitalist market economy and liberal democratic polity that expands state intervention to include income redistribution, regulation, and a welfare state.

The socialist political movement includes political philosophies that originated in the revolutionary movements of the mid-to-late 18th century and out of concern for the social problems that socialists associated with capitalism. By the late 19th century, after the work of Karl Marx and his collaborator Friedrich Engels, socialism had come to signify anti-capitalism and advocacy for a post-capitalist system based on some form of social ownership of the means of production. By the early 1920s, communism and social democracy had become the two dominant political tendencies within the international socialist movement, with socialism itself becoming the most influential secular movement of the 20th century. Many socialists also adopted the causes of other social movements, such as feminism, environmentalism, and progressivism.

Although the emergence of the Soviet Union as the world's first nominally socialist state led to the widespread association of socialism with the Soviet economic model, the term has since shifted to be associated with democratic socialism. Academics sometimes recognised the mixed economies of several Western European and Nordic countries as "democratic socialist", although the system of these countries, with only limited social ownership (generally in the form of state ownership), is more usually described as social democracy. Following the revolutions of 1989, many of these countries moved away from socialism as a neoliberal consensus replaced the social democratic consensus in the advanced capitalist world. In parallel, many former socialist politicians and political parties embraced "Third Way" politics, remaining committed to equality and welfare while abandoning public ownership and class-based politics. Socialist politics experienced a revival in parts of the Western world during the 2010s, amid growing economic inequality, dissatisfaction with the aftermath of the 2008 financial crisis, and perceptions that political institutions favored economic elites.

== Etymology ==
According to Andrew Vincent, the word 'socialism' finds its root in the Latin sociare, which means to combine or to share. The related, more technical term in Roman and then medieval law was societas. This latter word could mean companionship and fellowship as well as the more legalistic idea of a consensual contract between freemen.

19th century utopian socialist pamphlet by Rudolf Sutermeister

Initial use of socialism was claimed by Pierre Leroux, who alleged he first used the term in the Parisian journal Le Globe in 1832. Leroux was a follower of Henri de Saint-Simon, one of the founders of what would later be labelled utopian socialism. Socialism contrasted with the liberal doctrine of individualism that emphasized the moral worth of the individual while stressing that people act or should act as if they are in isolation from one another. The original utopian socialists condemned this doctrine of individualism for failing to address social concerns during the Industrial Revolution, including poverty, oppression, and vast wealth inequality. They viewed their society as harming community life by basing society on competition. They presented socialism as an alternative to liberal individualism based on the shared ownership of resources. Saint-Simon proposed economic planning, scientific administration and the application of scientific understanding to the organisation of society. By contrast, Robert Owen proposed to organise production and ownership via cooperatives. His Co-Operative Magazine and Monthly Herald used the term socialists as early as 1827 to refer to those favoring the common ownership of capital. Socialism is also attributed in France to Marie Roch Louis Reybaud while in Britain it is attributed to Owen, who became one of the fathers of the cooperative movement.

The definition and usage of socialism settled by the 1860s, with the term socialist replacing associationist, co-operative, mutualist and collectivist, which had been used as synonyms, while the term communism fell out of use during this period. An early distinction between communism and socialism was that the latter aimed to only socialise production while the former aimed to socialise both production and consumption (in the form of free access to final goods). By 1888, Marxists employed socialism in place of communism as the latter had come to be considered an old-fashioned synonym for socialism. It was not until after the Bolshevik Revolution that socialism was appropriated by Vladimir Lenin to mean a stage between capitalism and communism. He used it to defend the Bolshevik program from Marxist criticism that Russia's productive forces were not sufficiently developed for communism. The distinction between communism and socialism became salient in 1918 after the Russian Social Democratic Labour Party renamed itself to the All-Russian Communist Party, interpreting communism specifically to mean socialists who supported the politics and theories of Bolshevism, Leninism and later that of Marxism–Leninism, although communist parties continued to describe themselves as socialists dedicated to socialism. According to The Oxford Handbook of Karl Marx, "Marx used many terms to refer to a post-capitalist society—positive humanism, socialism, communism, realm of free individuality, free association of producers, etc. He used these terms completely interchangeably. The notion that 'socialism' and 'communism' are distinct historical stages is alien to his work and only entered the lexicon of Marxism after his death".

In Christian Europe, communists were believed to have adopted atheism. In Protestant England, communism was too close to the Roman Catholic communion rite, hence socialist was the preferred term. Engels wrote that in 1848, when The Communist Manifesto was published, socialism was respectable in Europe while communism was not. The Owenites in England and the Fourierists in France were considered respectable socialists while working-class movements that "proclaimed the necessity of total social change" denoted themselves communists. This branch of socialism produced the communist work of Étienne Cabet in France and Wilhelm Weitling in Germany. British moral philosopher John Stuart Mill discussed a form of economic socialism within free market. In later editions of his Principles of Political Economy (1848), Mill posited that "as far as economic theory was concerned, there is nothing in principle in economic theory that precludes an economic order based on socialist policies" and promoted substituting capitalist businesses with worker cooperatives. While democrats looked to the Revolutions of 1848 as a democratic revolution which in the long run ensured liberty, equality, and fraternity, Marxists denounced it as a betrayal of working-class ideals by a bourgeoisie indifferent to the proletariat.

== History ==
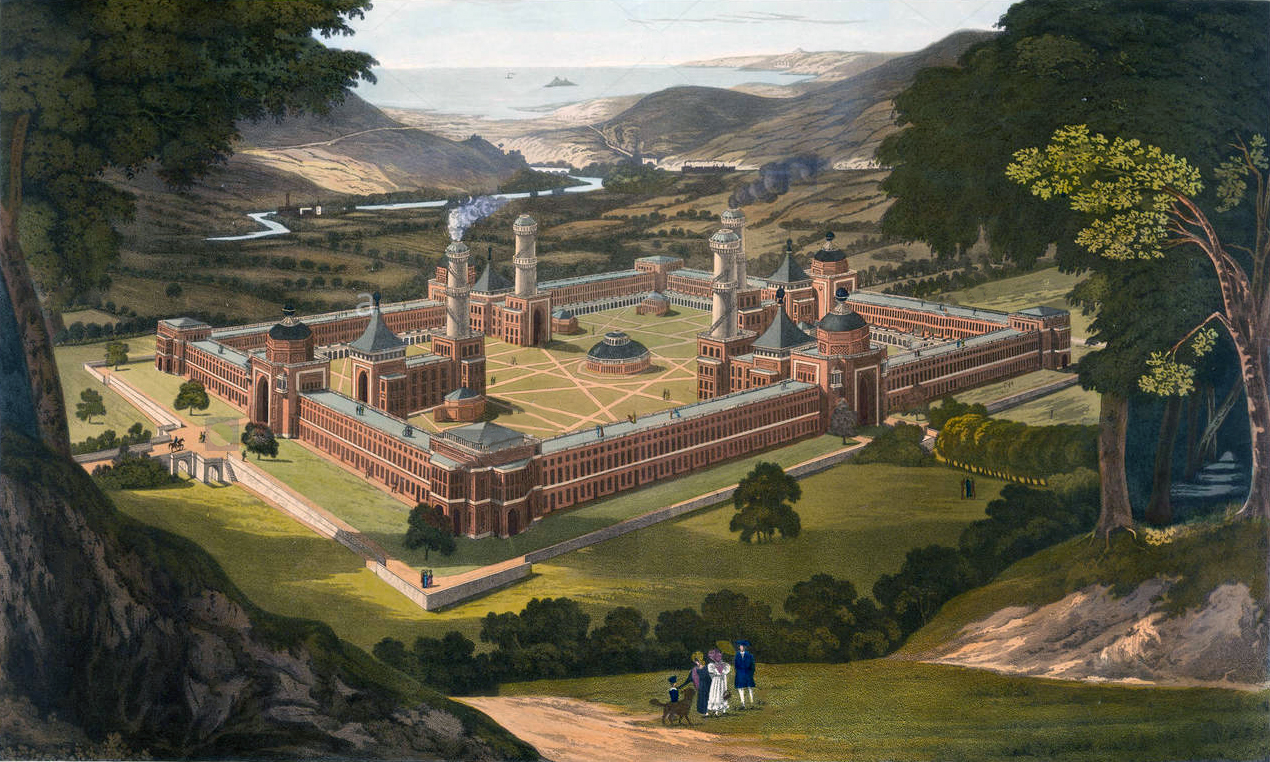
New Harmony, a utopian attempt as proposed by Robert Owen

The history of socialism has its origins in the Age of Enlightenment and the 1789 French Revolution, along with the changes that brought, although it has precedents in earlier movements and ideas. The Communist Manifesto was written by Karl Marx and Friedrich Engels in 1847–48 just before the Revolutions of 1848 swept Europe, expressing what they termed scientific socialism. In the last third of the 19th century parties dedicated to Democratic socialism arose in Europe, drawing mainly from Marxism. For a duration of one week in December 1899, the Australian Labor Party formed the first socialist government in the world when it was elected into power in the Colony of Queensland with Premier Anderson Dawson as its leader.

=== 20th century ===
States that had socialist governments States that the Soviet Union believed at one point to be moving toward socialism Other states allied with the Soviet Union at some point

In the first half of the 20th century, the Soviet Union and the communist parties of the Third International around the world, came to represent socialism in terms of the Soviet model of economic development and the creation of centrally planned economies directed by a state that owns all the means of production, although other trends condemned what they saw as the lack of democracy. The establishment of the People's Republic of China in 1949, saw socialism introduced. China established a self-sufficient and self-reliant economy that was state-led and focused on rapid industrialization. Other policies included land redistribution and the Anti-Rightist Movement, followed by the disastrous Great Leap Forward.

Elsewhere, in contrast, reformist social democrats and democratic socialists came to power through the ballot box. In the UK, Herbert Morrison said that "socialism is what the Labour government does" whereas Aneurin Bevan argued socialism requires that the "main streams of economic activity are brought under public direction", with an economic plan and workers' democracy. Some argued that capitalism had been abolished. Socialist governments established the mixed economy with partial nationalisations and social welfare, as represented for example by the Nordic model.

By 1968, the prolonged Vietnam War gave rise to the New Left, socialists who tended to be critical of the Soviet Union and social democracy. Anarcho-syndicalists and some elements of the New Left and others favoured decentralised collective ownership in the form of cooperatives or workers' councils. In 1989, the Soviet Union saw the end of communism, marked by the Revolutions of 1989 across Eastern Europe, culminating in the dissolution of the Soviet Union in 1991. Socialists have adopted the causes of other social movements such as environmentalism, feminism and progressivism.

=== Early 21st century ===
Map showing socialism in Latin America, the pink tide (Foro de São Paulo members) in 2023: Socialist government Member not in government

In 1990, the São Paulo Forum was launched by the Workers' Party (Brazil), linking left-wing socialist parties in Latin America. Its members were associated with the pink tide of left-wing governments on the continent in the early 21st century. Member parties ruling countries included the Front for Victory in Argentina, the PAIS Alliance in Ecuador, Farabundo Martí National Liberation Front in El Salvador, Peru Wins in Peru, and the United Socialist Party of Venezuela, whose leader Hugo Chávez initiated what he called "Socialism of the 21st century".

Many mainstream democratic socialist and social democratic parties continued to drift right-wards. On the right of the socialist movement, the Progressive Alliance was founded in 2013 by current or former members of the Socialist International. The organisation states the aim of becoming the global network of "the progressive, democratic, social-democratic, socialist and labour movement". Mainstream social democratic and socialist parties are also networked in Europe in the Party of European Socialists formed in 1992. Many of these parties lost large parts of their electoral base in the early 21st century. This phenomenon is known as Pasokification from the Greek party PASOK, which saw a declining share of the vote in national elections—from 43.9% in 2009 to 13.2% in May 2012, to 12.3% in June 2012 and 4.7% in 2015—due to its poor handling of the Greek government-debt crisis and implementation of harsh austerity measures.

In Europe, the share of votes for such socialist parties was at its 70-year lowest in 2015. For example, the Socialist Party, after winning the 2012 French presidential election, rapidly lost its vote share, the Social Democratic Party of Germany's fortunes declined rapidly from 2005 to 2019, and outside Europe the Israeli Labor Party fell from being the dominant force in Israeli politics to 4.43% of the vote in the April 2019 Israeli legislative election, and the Peruvian Aprista Party went from ruling party in 2011 to a minor party. The decline of these mainstream parties opened space for more radical and populist left parties in some countries, such as Spain's Podemos, Greece's Syriza (in government, 2015–19), Germany's Die Linke, and France's La France Insoumise. In other countries, left-wing revivals have taken place within mainstream democratic socialist and centrist parties, as with Jeremy Corbyn in the United Kingdom and Bernie Sanders in the United States in the 2010s. Few of these radical left parties have won national government in Europe, while some more mainstream socialist parties have managed to, such as Portugal's Socialist Party.

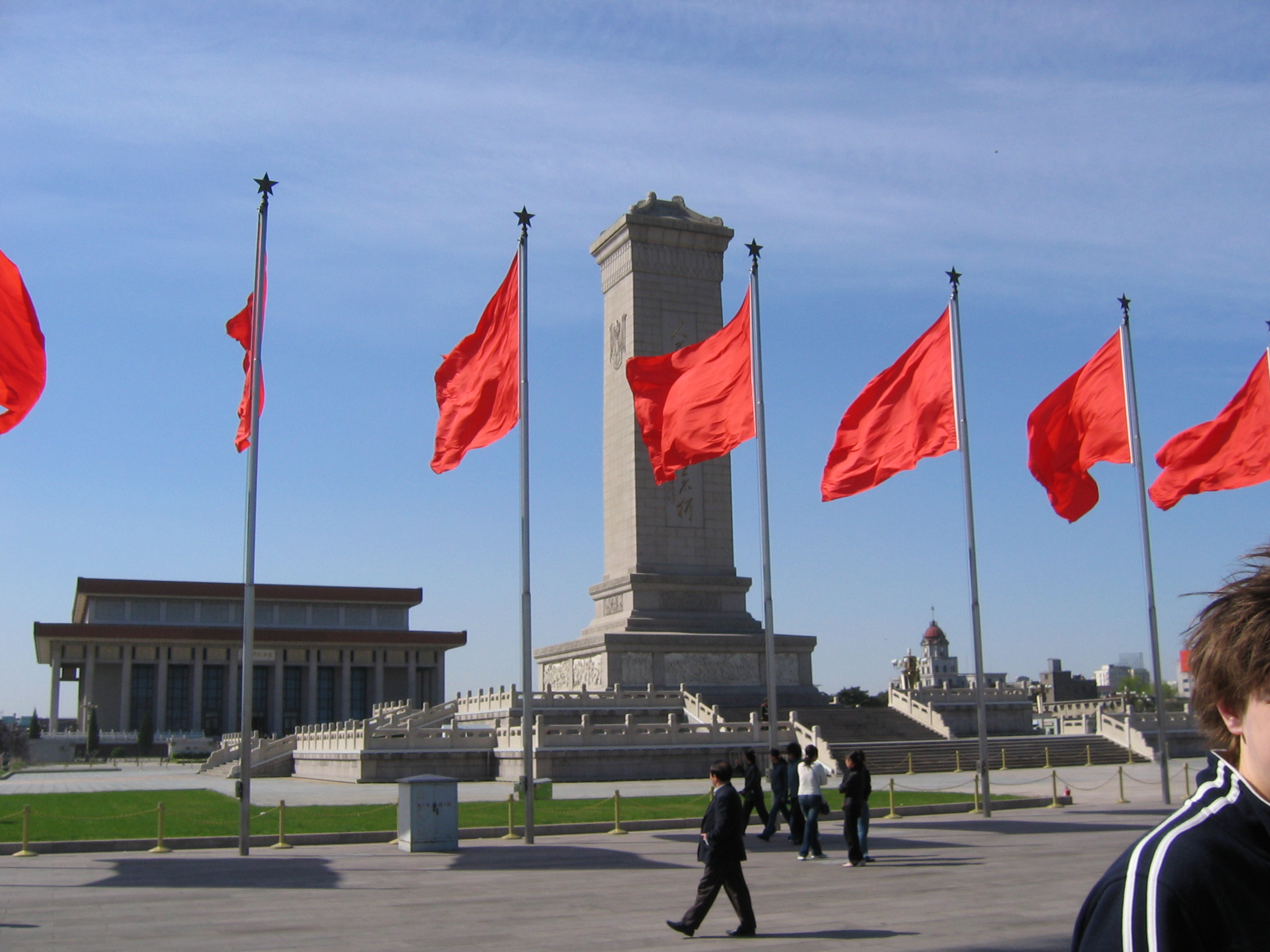
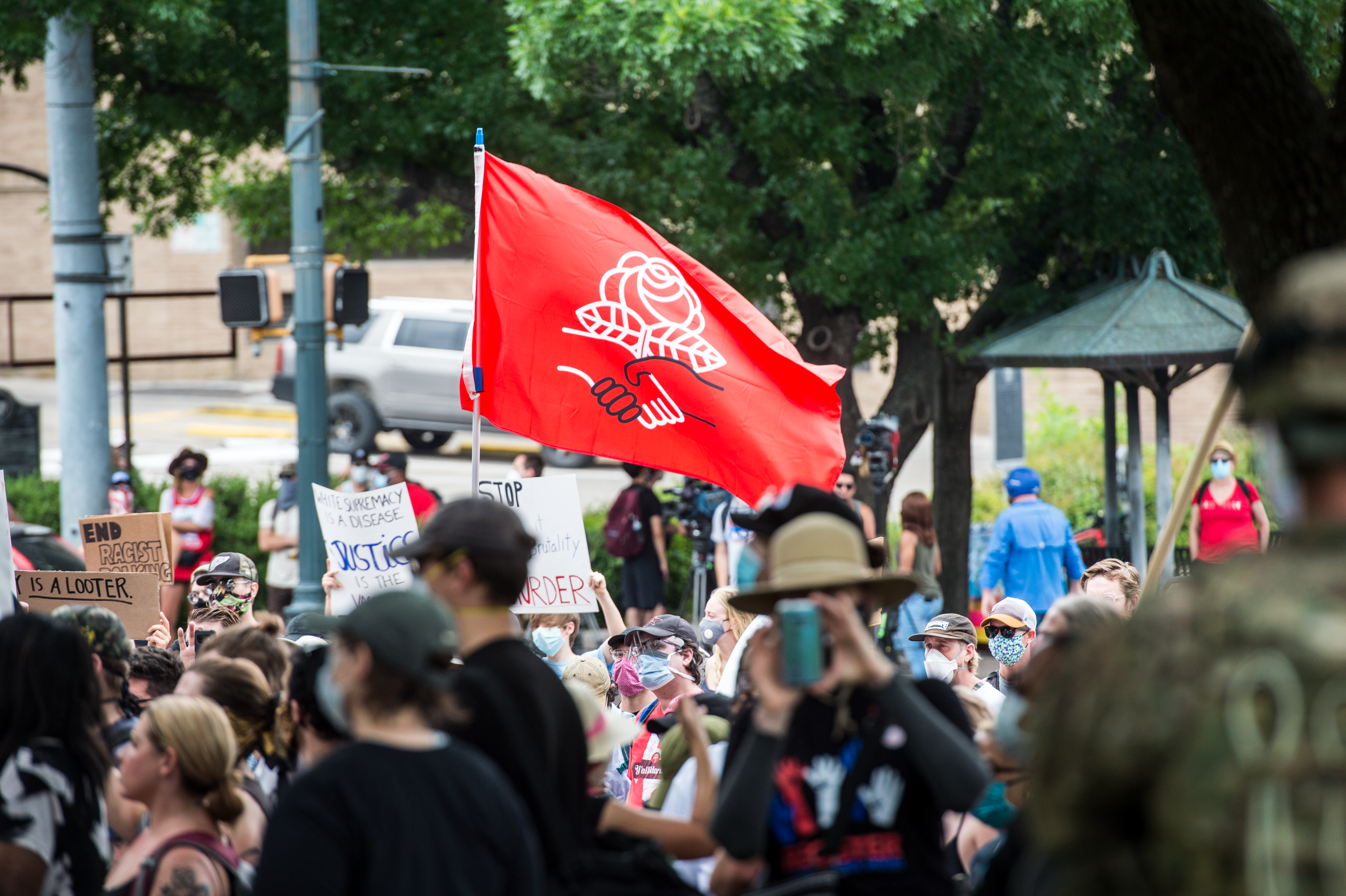
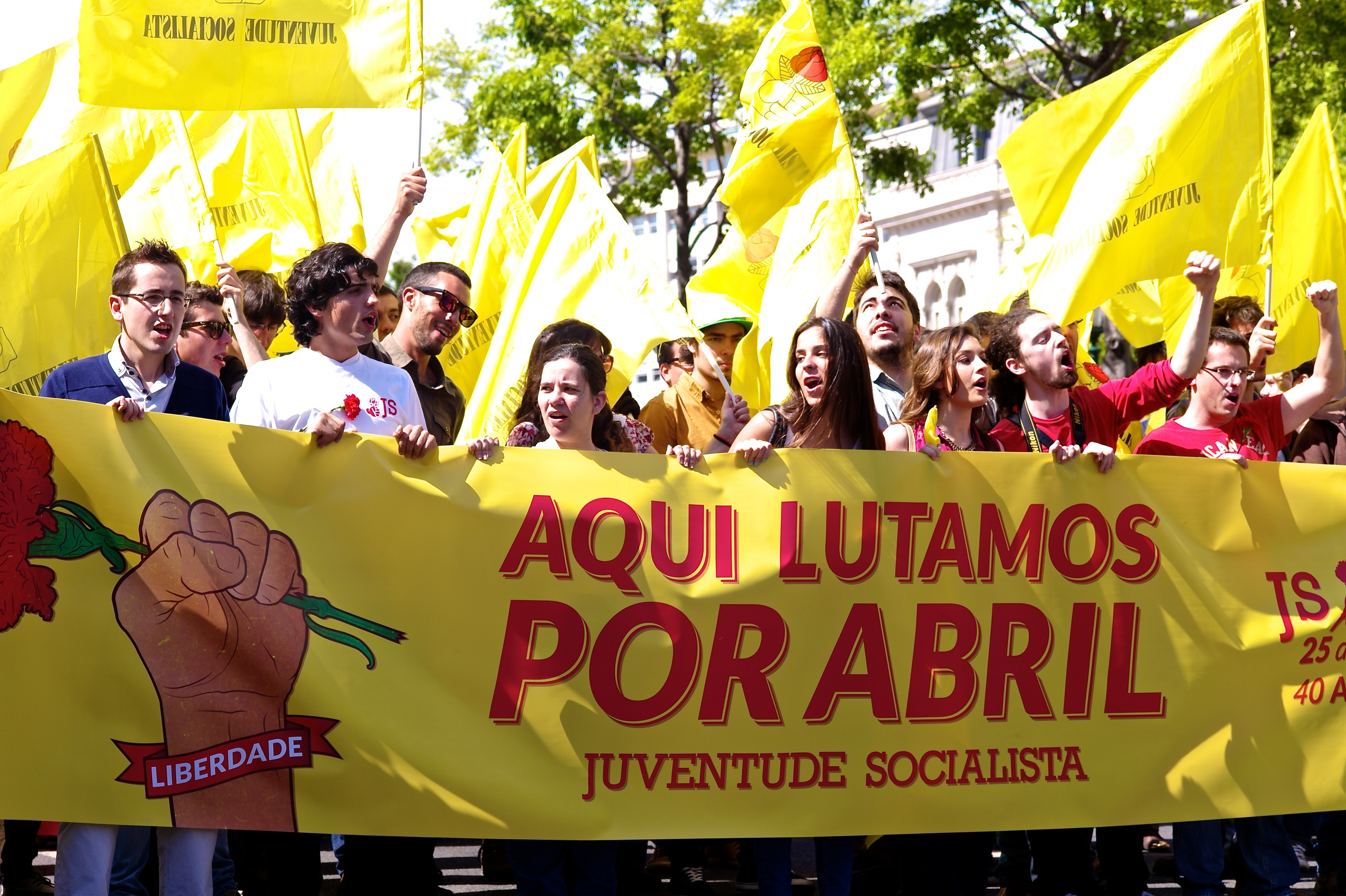
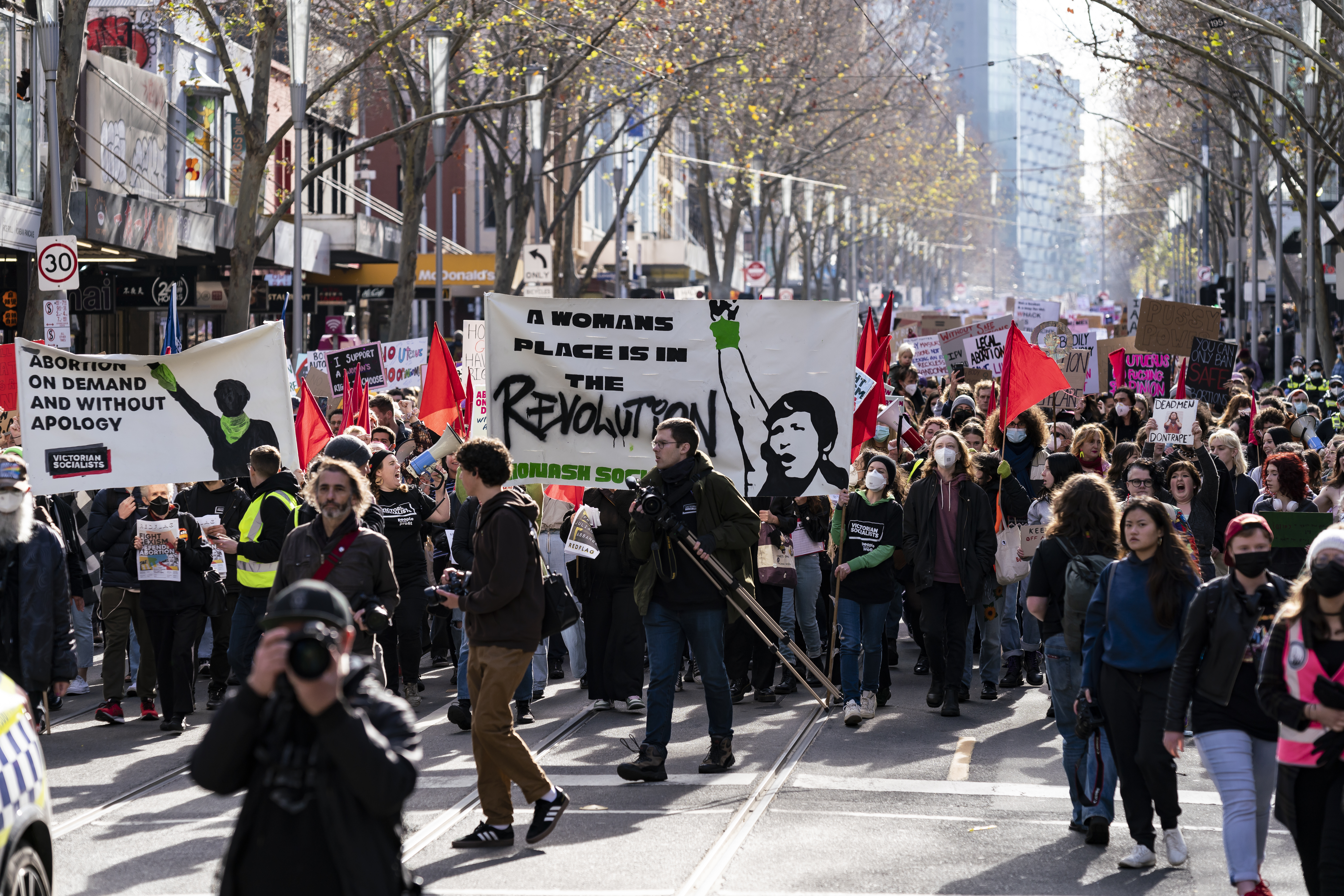
Socialism across the world.
Top-left: a picture of the red flags found by the Monument to the People's Heroes, China.
Top-right: a demonstration in Austin, Texas, US by the Democratic Socialists of America.
Bottom-left: a demonstration by the Portuguese Socialist Youth.
Bottom-right: a rally for abortion rights in Melbourne, Victoria, Australia being led by members of the Victorian Socialists.

== Varieties ==
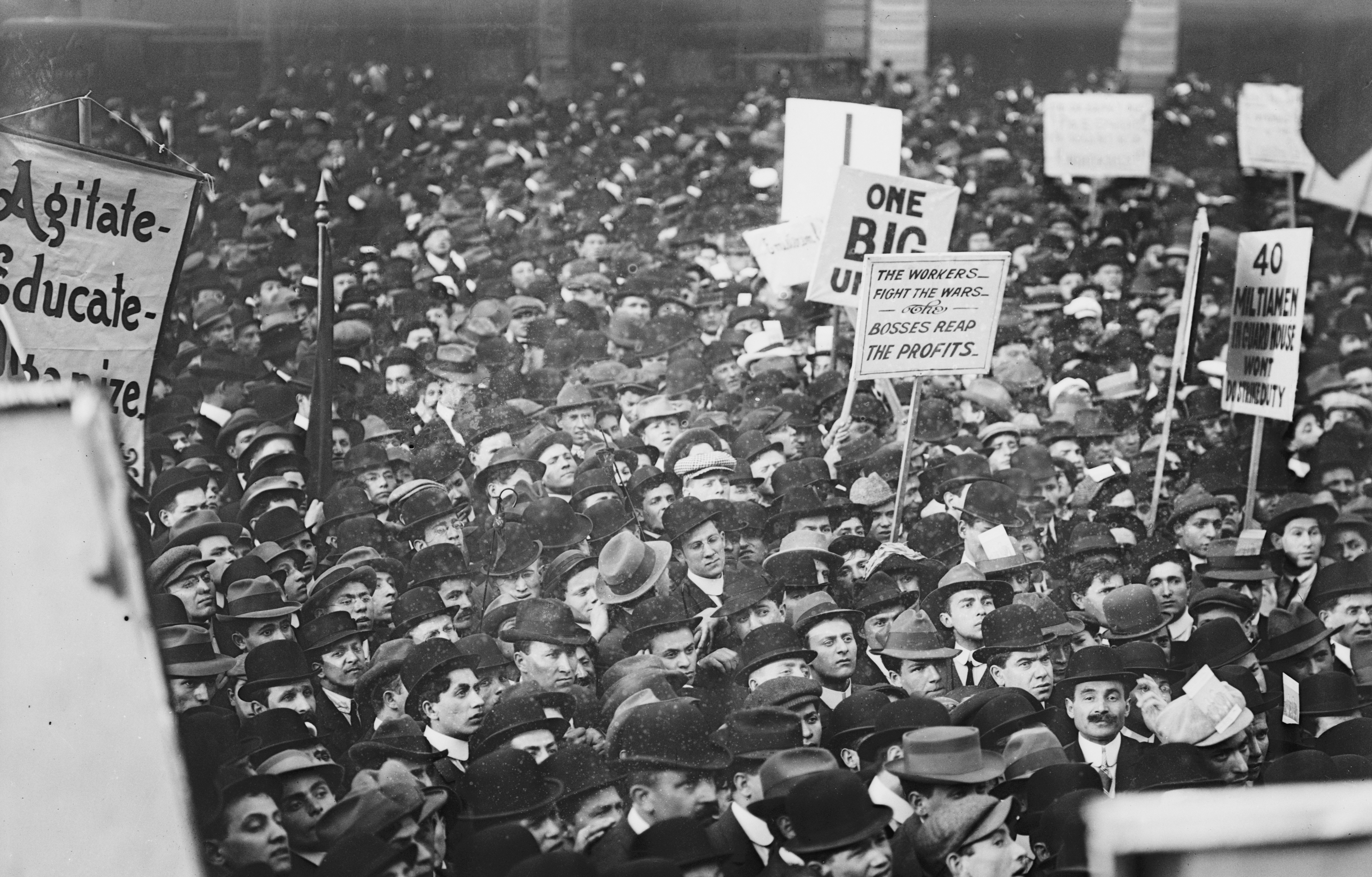
Socialists in Union Square, New York City on May Day 1912

While major socialist political movements include anarchism, communism, the labour movement, Marxism, social democracy, and syndicalism, independent socialist theorists, utopian socialist authors, and academic supporters of socialism may not be represented in these movements. Some political groups have called themselves socialist while holding views that some consider antithetical to socialism. Socialist has been used by members of the political right as an epithet, including against individuals who do not consider themselves to be socialists and against policies that are not considered socialist by their proponents. While there are many variations of socialism, and there is no single definition encapsulating all of socialism, there have been common elements identified by scholars.

In his Dictionary of Socialism (1924), Angelo S. Rappoport analysed forty definitions of socialism to conclude that common elements of socialism include general criticism of the social effects of private ownership and control of capital—as being the cause of poverty, low wages, unemployment, economic and social inequality and a lack of economic security; a general view that the solution to these problems is a form of collective control over the means of production, distribution and exchange (the degree and means of control vary among socialist movements); an agreement that the outcome of this collective control should be a society based upon social justice, including social equality, economic protection of people and should provide a more satisfying life for most people.

In The Concepts of Socialism (1975), Bhikhu Parekh identifies four core principles of socialism and particularly socialist society, namely sociality, social responsibility, cooperation and planning. In his study Ideologies and Political Theory (1996), Michael Freeden states that all socialists share five themes: the first is that socialism posits that society is more than a mere collection of individuals; second, that it considers human welfare a desirable objective; third, that it considers humans by nature to be active and productive; fourth, it holds the belief of human equality; and fifth, that history is progressive and will create positive change on the condition that humans work to achieve such change.

=== African socialism ===
This map shows the countries that adopted some form of socialism on the African continent at various times from the 1950s to the 1980s.

African socialism is a distinct variant of socialist theory developed in post-colonial Africa during the mid-20th century. As a shared ideology among several African thinkers over the decades, it encompasses a variety of competing interpretations. However, a consistent and defining theme among these theories is the notion that traditional African cultures and community structures have a natural inclination toward socialist principles.

Several African countries adopted socialist systems from the 1950s to mid-1980s (~35 out of ~50-53 countries at the time).

=== Anarchism ===
The capital letter A surrounded by a circle is a common symbol of anarchism.

Anarchism advocates stateless societies often defined as self-governed voluntary institutions, but that several authors have defined as more specific institutions based on non-hierarchical free associations. While anarchism holds the state to be undesirable, unnecessary or harmful, it is not the central aspect. Anarchism entails opposing authority or hierarchical organisation in the conduct of human relations, including the state system. Mutualists support market socialism, collectivist anarchists favour workers cooperatives and salaries based on the amount of time contributed to production, anarcho-communists advocate a direct transition from capitalism to libertarian communism and a gift economy and anarcho-syndicalists prefer workers' direct action and the general strike.

The authoritarian–libertarian struggles and disputes within the socialist movement go back to the First International and the expulsion in 1872 of the anarchists, who went on to lead the Anti-authoritarian International and then founded their own libertarian international, the Anarchist St. Imier International. In 1888, the individualist anarchist Benjamin Tucker, who proclaimed himself to be an anarchistic socialist and libertarian socialist in opposition to the authoritarian state socialism and the compulsory communism, included the full text of a "Socialistic Letter" by Ernest Lesigne in his essay on "State Socialism and Anarchism". According to Lesigne, there are two types of socialism: "One is dictatorial, the other libertarian". Tucker's two socialisms were the authoritarian state socialism which he associated to the Marxist school and the libertarian anarchist socialism, or simply anarchism, that he advocated. Tucker noted that the fact that the authoritarian "State Socialism has overshadowed other forms of Socialism gives it no right to a monopoly of the Socialistic idea". According to Tucker, what those two schools of socialism had in common was the labor theory of value and the ends, by which anarchism pursued different means.

According to anarchists such as the authors of An Anarchist FAQ, anarchism is one of the many traditions of socialism. For anarchists and other anti-authoritarian socialists, socialism "can only mean a classless and anti-authoritarian (i.e. libertarian) society in which people manage their own affairs, either as individuals or as part of a group (depending on the situation). In other words, it implies self-management in all aspects of life", including at the workplace. Michael Newman includes anarchism as one of many socialist traditions. Peter Marshall argues that "[i]n general anarchism is closer to socialism than liberalism. ... Anarchism finds itself largely in the socialist camp, but it also has outriders in liberalism. It cannot be reduced to socialism, and is best seen as a separate and distinctive doctrine."

=== Arab socialism ===
Arab socialism (Arabic: الإشتِراكيّة العربية, romanized: Al-Ishtirākīya Al-'Arabīya) is a political ideology based on the combination of pan-Arabism or Arab nationalism and socialism. The term Arab socialism was coined by Michel Aflaq, the principal founder of Ba'athism and the Arab Socialist Ba'ath Party in Syria, to distinguish his version of socialist ideology from the international socialist movement. While distinct from the much broader tradition of socialist thought in the Arab world, which predates Arab socialism by as much as fifty years, direct influence and evolutions of his thought, Marxist or otherwise, were realized and expanded upon in countries like Syria, Egypt, Iraq and others. A main innovation of Aflaq's thought was the transformation of Arab unity from an intellectual ideal into a real-world political pursuit of rights alongside a new set of socioeconomic conditions. Gamal Abdel Nasser's Egypt in particular served as a potent vehicle for Aflaq's thought, and would have to grapple with crises in the intellectual and military spheres.

=== Authoritarian socialism ===
Authoritarian socialism, or socialism from above, is an economic and political system supporting some form of socialist economics while rejecting political pluralism. As a term, it represents a set of economic-political systems describing themselves as "socialist" and rejecting the liberal-democratic concepts of multi-party politics, freedom of assembly, habeas corpus, and freedom of expression, either due to fear of counter-revolution or as a means to socialist ends. Journalists and scholars have characterised several countries, most notably the Soviet Union, China, Cuba, and their allies, as authoritarian socialist states.

==== Leninism ====
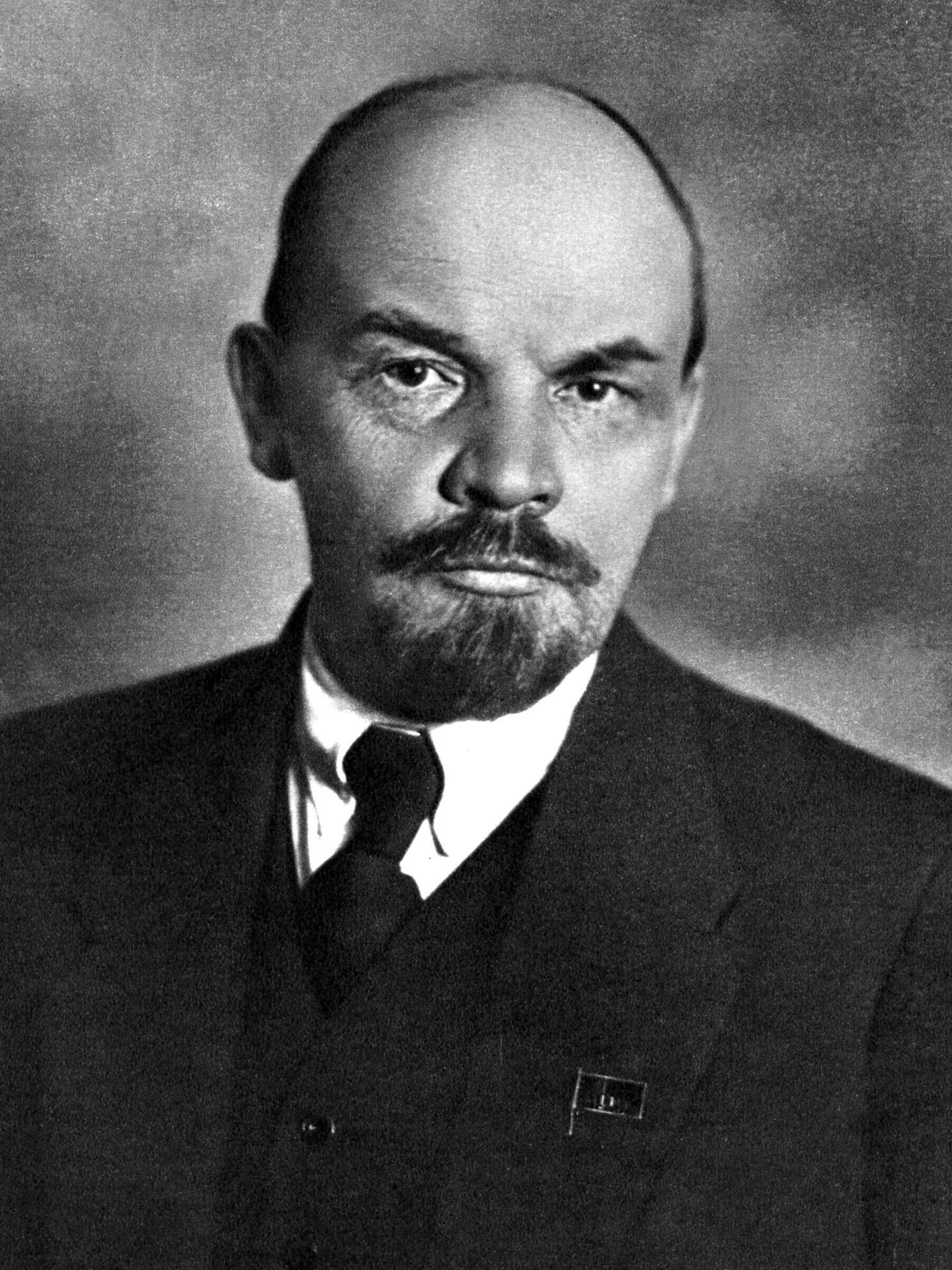
Russian revolutionary, politician, and political theorist Vladimir Lenin in 1920

Blanquism is a conception of revolution named for Louis Auguste Blanqui. It holds that socialist revolution should be carried out by a relatively small group of highly organised and secretive conspirators. Upon seizing power, the revolutionaries introduce socialism. Rosa Luxemburg and Eduard Bernstein criticised Lenin, stating that his conception of revolution was elitist and Blanquist. Marxism–Leninism combines Marx's scientific socialist concepts and Lenin's anti-imperialism, democratic centralism, vanguardism and the principle of "He who does not work, neither shall he eat".

Hal Draper defined socialism from above as the philosophy which employs an elite administration to run the socialist state. The other side of socialism is a more democratic socialism from below. The idea of socialism from above is much more frequently discussed in elite circles than socialism from below—even if that is the Marxist ideal—because it is more practical. Draper viewed socialism from below as being the purer, more Marxist version of socialism. According to Draper, Karl Marx and Friedrich Engels were devoutly opposed to any socialist institution that was "conducive to superstitious authoritarianism". Draper makes the argument that this division echoes the division between "reformist or revolutionary, peaceful or violent, democratic or authoritarian, etc." and further identifies six major varieties of socialism from above, among them "Philanthropism", "Elitism", "Pannism", "Communism", "Permeationism" and "Socialism-from-Outside". According to Arthur Lipow, Marx and Engels were "the founders of modern revolutionary democratic socialism", described as a form of "socialism from below" that is "based on a mass working-class movement, fighting from below for the extension of democracy and human freedom". This type of socialism is contrasted to that of the "authoritarian, anti-democratic creed" and "the various totalitarian collectivist ideologies which claim the title of socialism" as well as "the many varieties of 'socialism from above' which have led in the twentieth century to movements and state forms in which a despotic 'new class' rules over a stratified economy in the name of socialism", a division that "runs through the history of the socialist movement". Lipow identifies Bellamyism and Stalinism as two prominent authoritarian socialist currents within the history of the socialist movement.

Trotsky viewed himself to be an adherent of Leninism but opposed the bureaucratic and authoritarian methods of Stalin. A number of scholars and Western socialists have regarded Leon Trotsky as a democratic alternative rather than a forerunner to Stalin with particular emphasis drawn to his activities in the pre-Civil War period and as leader of the Left Opposition. More specifically, Trotsky advocated for a decentralised form of economic planning, mass soviet democratization, worker's control of production, elected representation of Soviet socialist parties, the tactic of a united front against far-right parties, cultural autonomy for artistic movements, voluntary collectivisation, a transitional program, and socialist internationalism. Several scholars have argued that in practice, the Soviet model functioned as a form of state capitalism.

=== Democratic socialism and social democracy ===
The fist and rose, a common symbol of democratic socialism and social democracy

You can't talk about ending the slums without first saying profit must be taken out of slums. You're really tampering and getting on dangerous ground because you are messing with folk then. You are messing with captains of industry. Now this means that we are treading in difficult water, because it really means that we are saying that something is wrong with capitalism. There must be a better distribution of wealth, and maybe America must move toward a democratic socialism.

— Martin Luther King Jr., 1966

Democratic socialism represents any socialist movement that seeks to establish an economy based on economic democracy by and for the working class. Democratic socialism is difficult to define and groups of scholars have radically different definitions for the term. Some definitions simply refer to all forms of socialism that follow an electoral, reformist or evolutionary path to socialism rather than a revolutionary one. According to Christopher Pierson, "if the contrast which 1989 highlights is not that between socialism in the East and liberal democracy in the West, the latter must be recognised to have been shaped, reformed and compromised by a century of social democratic pressure". Pierson further claims that "social democratic and socialist parties within the constitutional arena in the West have almost always been involved in a politics of compromise with existing capitalist institutions (to whatever far distant prize its eyes might from time to time have been lifted)". For Pierson, "if advocates of the death of socialism accept that social democrats belong within the socialist camp, as I think they must, then the contrast between socialism (in all its variants) and liberal democracy must collapse. For actually existing liberal democracy is, in substantial part, a product of socialist (social democratic) forces".

Social democracy is a socialist tradition of political thought. Many social democrats refer to themselves as socialists or democratic socialists and some such as Tony Blair employ these terms interchangeably. Others found "clear differences" between the three terms and prefer to describe their own political beliefs by using the term social democracy. The two main directions were to establish democratic socialism or to build first a welfare state within the capitalist system. The first variant advances democratic socialism through reformist and gradualist methods. In the second variant, social democracy is a policy regime involving a welfare state, collective bargaining schemes, support for publicly financed public services and a mixed economy. It is often used in this manner to refer to Western and Northern Europe during the later half of the 20th century. It was described by Jerry Mander as "hybrid economics", an active collaboration of capitalist and socialist visions. Some studies and surveys indicate that people tend to live happier and healthier lives in social democratic societies rather than neoliberal ones.

Social democrats advocate a peaceful, evolutionary transition of the economy to socialism through progressive social reform. It asserts that the only acceptable constitutional form of government is representative democracy under the rule of law. It promotes extending democratic decision-making beyond political democracy to include economic democracy to guarantee employees and other economic stakeholders sufficient rights of co-determination. It supports a mixed economy that opposes inequality, poverty and oppression while rejecting both a totally unregulated market economy or a fully planned economy. Common social democratic policies include universal social rights and universally accessible public services such as education, health care, workers' compensation and other services, including child care and elder care. Socialist child care and elderly care systems allow citizens to take a more active role in building a socialist society, especially women. Social democracy supports the trade union labour movement and supports collective bargaining rights for workers. Most social democratic parties are affiliated with the Socialist International.

Modern democratic socialism is a broad political movement that seeks to promote the ideals of socialism within the context of a democratic system. Some democratic socialists support social democracy as a temporary measure to reform the current system while others reject reformism in favour of more revolutionary methods. Modern social democracy emphasises a program of gradual legislative modification of capitalism to make it more equitable and humane while the theoretical end goal of building a socialist society is relegated to the indefinite future. According to Sheri Berman, Marxism is loosely held to be valuable for its emphasis on changing the world for a more just, better future.

The two movements are widely similar both in terminology and in ideology, although there are a few key differences. The major difference between social democracy and democratic socialism is the object of their politics in that contemporary social democrats support a welfare state and unemployment insurance as well as other practical, progressive reforms of capitalism and are more concerned to administrate and humanise it. On the other hand, democratic socialists seek to replace capitalism with a socialist economic system, arguing that any attempt to humanise capitalism through regulations and welfare policies would distort the market and create economic contradictions.

==== Ethical and liberal socialism ====
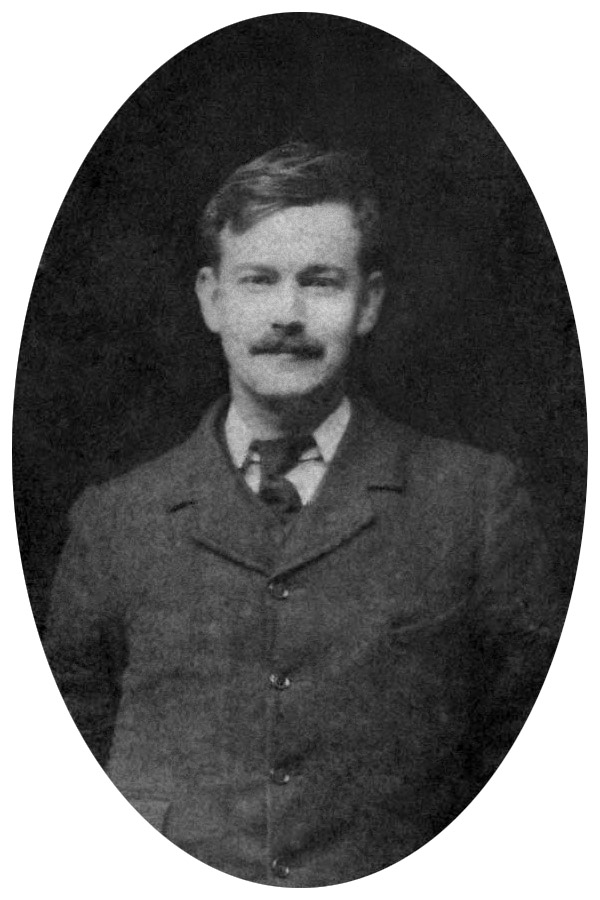
R. H. Tawney, founder of ethical socialism

Ethical socialism appeals to socialism on ethical and moral grounds as opposed to economic, egoistic, and consumeristic grounds. It emphasizes the need for a morally conscious economy based upon the principles of altruism, cooperation, and social justice while opposing possessive individualism. Ethical socialism has been the official philosophy of mainstream socialist parties.

Liberal socialism incorporates liberal principles to socialism. It has been compared to post-war social democracy for its support of a mixed economy that includes both public and private capital goods. While democratic socialism and social democracy are anti-capitalist positions insofar as criticism of capitalism is linked to the private ownership of the means of production, liberal socialism identifies artificial and legalistic monopolies to be the fault of capitalism and opposes an entirely unregulated market economy. It considers both liberty and social equality to be compatible and mutually dependent.

Principles that can be described as ethical or liberal socialist have been based upon or developed by philosophers such as John Stuart Mill, Eduard Bernstein, John Dewey, Carlo Rosselli, Norberto Bobbio, and Chantal Mouffe. Other important liberal socialist figures include Guido Calogero, Piero Gobetti, Leonard Trelawny Hobhouse, John Maynard Keynes and R. H. Tawney. Liberal socialism has been particularly prominent in British and Italian politics.

==== Libertarian socialism ====
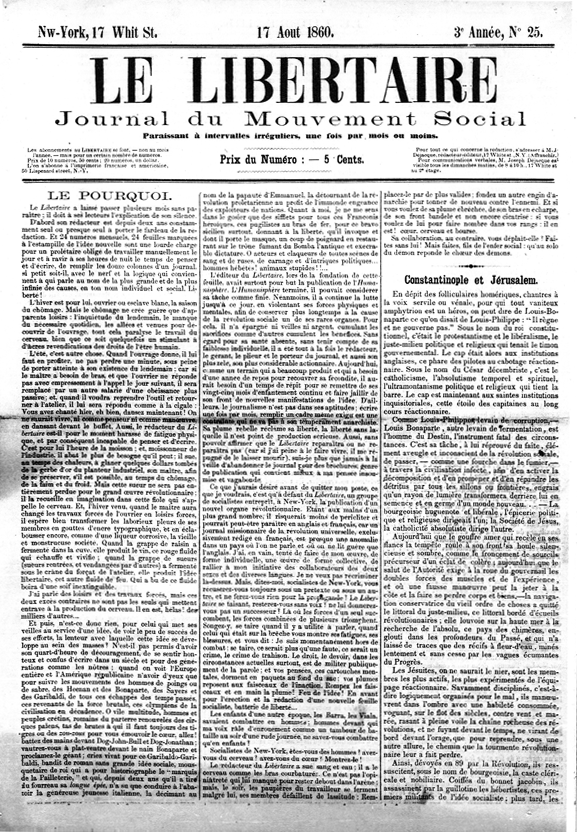
The first anarchist journal to use the term libertarian was Le Libertaire, Journal du Mouvement Social, published in New York City between 1858 and 1861 by French libertarian communist Joseph Déjacque, the first recorded person to describe himself as libertarian.

Libertarian socialism, sometimes called left-libertarianism, social anarchism and socialist libertarianism, is an anti-authoritarian, anti-statist and libertarian tradition within socialism that rejects centralised state ownership and control including criticism of wage labour relationships (wage slavery) as well as the state itself. It emphasises workers' self-management and decentralised structures of political organisation. Libertarian socialism asserts that a society based on freedom and equality can be achieved through abolishing authoritarian institutions that control production. Libertarian socialists generally prefer direct democracy and federal or confederal associations such as libertarian municipalism, citizens' assemblies, trade unions and workers' councils.

Anarcho-syndicalist Gaston Leval explained:

We therefore foresee a Society in which all activities will be coordinated, a structure that has, at the same time, sufficient flexibility to permit the greatest possible autonomy for social life, or for the life of each enterprise, and enough cohesiveness to prevent all disorder. ... In a well-organised society, all of these things must be systematically accomplished by means of parallel federations, vertically united at the highest levels, constituting one vast organism in which all economic functions will be performed in solidarity with all others and that will permanently preserve the necessary cohesion".

All of this is typically done within a general call for libertarian and voluntary free associations through the identification, criticism and practical dismantling of illegitimate authority in all aspects of human life.

As part of the larger socialist movement, it seeks to distinguish itself from Bolshevism, Leninism and Marxism–Leninism as well as social democracy. Past and present political philosophies and movements commonly described as libertarian socialist include anarchism (anarcho-communism, anarcho-syndicalism, collectivist anarchism, individualist anarchism and mutualism), autonomism, Communalism, participism, libertarian Marxism (council communism and Luxemburgism), revolutionary syndicalism and utopian socialism (Fourierism).

=== Religious socialism ===
Christian socialism is a broad concept involving an intertwining of Christian religion with socialism.

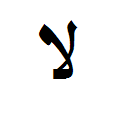
Arabic letters "Lam" and "Alif" reading "Lā" (Arabic for "No!") are a symbol of Islamic Socialism in Turkey.

Islamic socialism is a more spiritual form of socialism. Muslim socialists believe that the teachings of the Quran and Muhammad are not only compatible with, but actively promoting the principles of equality and public ownership, drawing inspiration from the early Medina welfare state he established. Muslim socialists are more conservative than their Western contemporaries and find their roots in anti-imperialism, anti-colonialism and sometimes, if in an Arab speaking country, Arab nationalism. Islamic socialists believe in deriving legitimacy from political mandate as opposed to religious texts.

=== Social movements ===
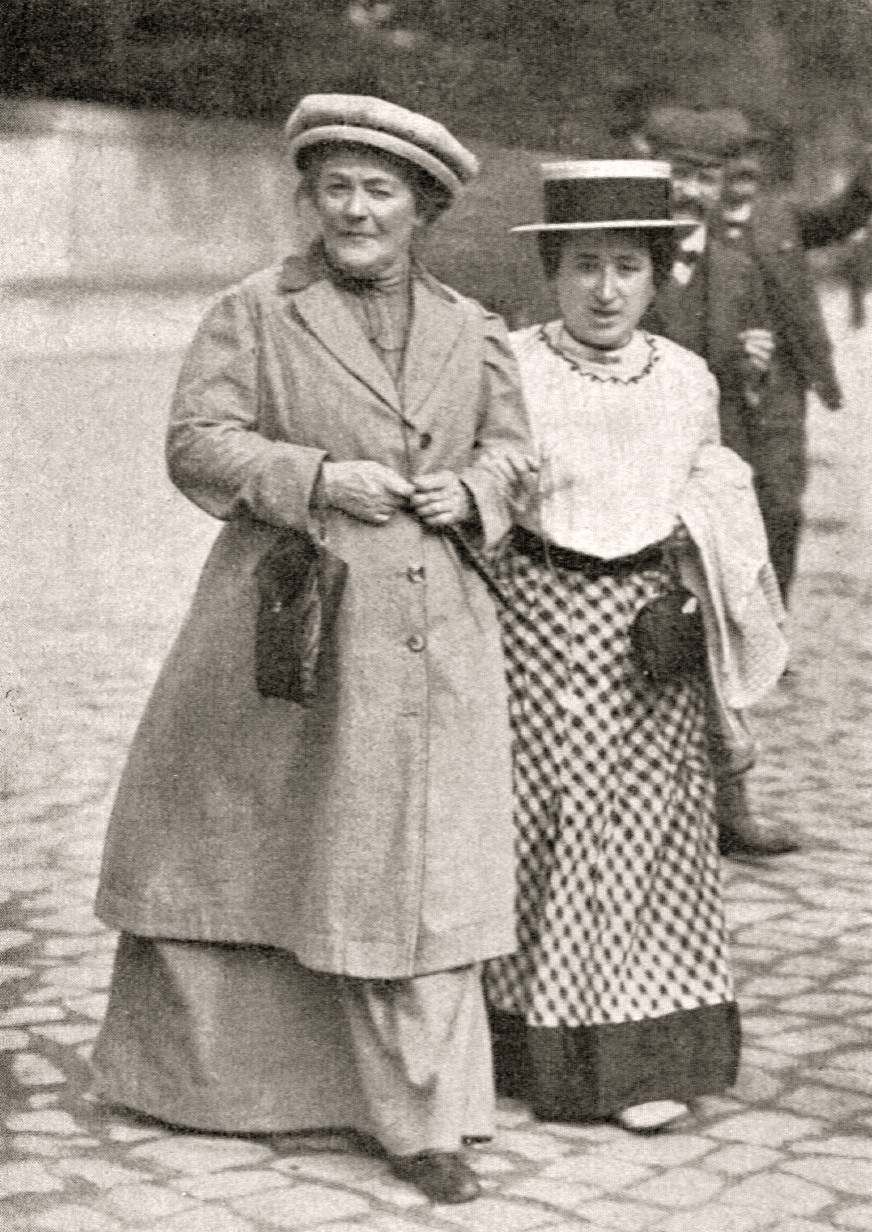
Socialist feminist Clara Zetkin and Rosa Luxemburg in 1910

Socialist feminism is a branch of feminism that argues that liberation can only be achieved by working to end both economic and cultural sources of women's oppression. Marxist feminism's foundation was laid by Engels in The Origin of the Family, Private Property, and the State (1884). August Bebel's Woman under Socialism (1879), is the "single work dealing with sexuality most widely read by rank-and-file members of the Social Democratic Party of Germany (SPD)". In the late 19th and early 20th centuries, both Clara Zetkin and Eleanor Marx were against the demonisation of men and supported a proletariat revolution that would overcome as many male-female inequalities as possible. As their movement already had the most radical demands in women's equality, most Marxist leaders, including Clara Zetkin and Alexandra Kollontai, counterposed Marxism against liberal feminism rather than trying to combine them. Anarcha-feminism began with late 19th- and early 20th-century authors and theorists such as anarchist feminists Goldman and Voltairine de Cleyre. In the Spanish Civil War, an anarcha-feminist group, Mujeres Libres ("Free Women") linked to the Federación Anarquista Ibérica, organised to defend both anarchist and feminist ideas. In 1972, the Chicago Women's Liberation Union published "Socialist Feminism: A Strategy for the Women's Movement", which is believed to be the first published use of the term "socialist feminism".

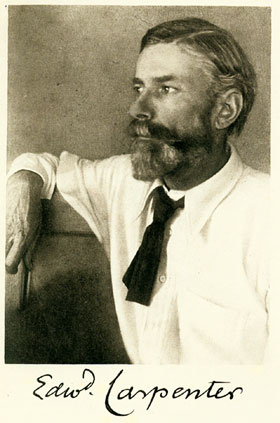
Edward Carpenter, philosopher and activist who was instrumental in the foundation of the Fabian Society and the Labour Party as well as in the early LGBTI western movements

Many socialists were early advocates of LGBT rights. For early socialist Charles Fourier, true freedom could only occur without suppressing passions, as the suppression of passions is not only destructive to the individual, but to society as a whole. Writing before the advent of the term "homosexuality", Fourier recognised that both men and women have a wide range of sexual needs and preferences which may change throughout their lives, including same-sex sexuality and androgénité. He argued that all sexual expressions should be enjoyed as long as people are not abused and that "affirming one's difference" can actually enhance social integration. In Oscar Wilde's The Soul of Man Under Socialism, he advocates an egalitarian society where wealth is shared by all, while warning of the dangers of social systems that crush individuality. Edward Carpenter actively campaigned for homosexual rights. His work The Intermediate Sex: A Study of Some Transitional Types of Men and Women was a 1908 book arguing for gay liberation. who was an influential personality in the foundation of the Fabian Society and the Labour Party. After the Russian Revolution under the leadership of Lenin and Trotsky, the Soviet Union abolished previous laws against homosexuality. Harry Hay was an early leader in the American LGBT rights movement as well as a member of the Communist Party USA. He is known for his involvement in the founding of gay organisations, including the Mattachine Society, the first sustained gay rights group in the United States which in its early days reflected a strong Marxist influence. The Encyclopedia of Homosexuality reports that "[a]s Marxists the founders of the group believed that the injustice and oppression which they suffered stemmed from relationships deeply embedded in the structure of American society". Emerging from events such as the May 1968 insurrection in France, the anti-Vietnam war movement in the US and the Stonewall riots of 1969, militant gay liberation organisations began to spring up around the world. Many sprang from left radicalism more than established homophile groups, although the Gay Liberation Front took an anti-capitalist stance and attacked the nuclear family and traditional gender roles.

Eco-socialism is a political strain merging aspects of socialism, Marxism or libertarian socialism with green politics, ecology and alter-globalisation. Eco-socialists generally claim that the expansion of the capitalist system is the cause of social exclusion, poverty, war and environmental degradation through globalisation and imperialism under the supervision of repressive states and transnational structures. Contrary to the depiction of Karl Marx by some environmentalists, social ecologists and fellow socialists as a productivist who favoured the domination of nature, eco-socialists revisited Marx's writings and believe that he "was a main originator of the ecological world-view". Marx discussed a "metabolic rift" between man and nature, stating that "private ownership of the globe by single individuals will appear quite absurd as private ownership of one man by another" and his observation that a society must "hand it [the planet] down to succeeding generations in an improved condition". English socialist William Morris is credited with developing principles of what was later called eco-socialism. During the 1880s and 1890s, Morris promoted his ideas within the Social Democratic Federation and Socialist League. Green anarchism blends anarchism with environmental issues. An important early influence was Henry David Thoreau and his book Walden as well as Élisée Reclus.

In the late 19th century, anarcho-naturism fused anarchism and naturist philosophies within individualist anarchist circles in France, Spain, Cuba and Portugal. Murray Bookchin's first book Our Synthetic Environment was followed by his essay "Ecology and Revolutionary Thought" which introduced ecology as a concept in radical politics. In the 1970s, Barry Commoner, claimed that capitalist technologies were chiefly responsible for environmental degradation as opposed to population pressures. In the 1990s socialist/feminists Mary Mellor and Ariel Salleh adopt an eco-socialist paradigm. An "environmentalism of the poor" combining ecological awareness and social justice has also become prominent. Pepper critiqued the current approach of many within green politics, particularly deep ecologists.

=== Syndicalism ===
Syndicalism operates through industrial trade unions. It rejects state socialism and the use of establishment politics. Syndicalists reject state power in favour of strategies such as the general strike. Syndicalists advocate a socialist economy based on federated unions or syndicates of workers who own and manage the means of production. Some Marxist currents advocate syndicalism, such as De Leonism. Anarcho-syndicalism views syndicalism as a method for workers in capitalist society to gain control of an economy. The Spanish Revolution was largely orchestrated by the anarcho-syndicalist trade union CNT. The International Workers' Association is an international federation of anarcho-syndicalist labour unions and initiatives.

== Social and political theory ==
Early socialist thought took influences from a diverse range of philosophies such as civic republicanism, Enlightenment rationalism, romanticism, forms of materialism, Christianity (both Catholic and Protestant), natural law and natural rights theory, utilitarianism and liberal political economy. Another philosophical basis for a great deal of early socialism was the emergence of positivism during the European Enlightenment. Positivism held that both the natural and social worlds could be understood through scientific knowledge and be analysed using scientific methods.

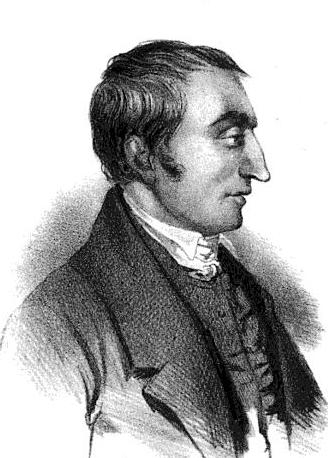
Claude Henri de Rouvroy, comte de Saint-Simon, early French socialist

The fundamental objective of socialism is to attain an advanced level of material production and therefore greater productivity, efficiency and rationality as compared to capitalism and all previous systems, under the view that an expansion of human productive capability is the basis for the extension of freedom and equality in society. Many forms of socialist theory hold that human behaviour is largely shaped by the social environment. In particular, socialism holds that social mores, values, cultural traits and economic practices are social creations and not the result of an immutable natural law. The object of their critique is thus not human avarice or human consciousness, but the material conditions and man-made social systems (i.e. the economic structure of society) which give rise to observed social problems and inefficiencies. Bertrand Russell, often considered to be the father of analytic philosophy, identified as a socialist. Russell opposed the class struggle aspects of Marxism, viewing socialism solely as an adjustment of economic relations to accommodate modern machine production to benefit all of humanity through the progressive reduction of necessary work time.

Socialists view creativity as an essential aspect of human nature and define freedom as a state of being where individuals are able to express their creativity unhindered by constraints of both material scarcity and coercive social institutions. The socialist concept of individuality is intertwined with the concept of individual creative expression. Karl Marx believed that expansion of the productive forces and technology was the basis for the expansion of human freedom and that socialism, being a system that is consistent with modern developments in technology, would enable the flourishing of "free individualities" through the progressive reduction of necessary labour time. The reduction of necessary labour time to a minimum would grant individuals the opportunity to pursue the development of their true individuality and creativity.

=== Criticism of capitalism ===
Socialists argue that the accumulation of capital generates waste through externalities that require costly corrective regulatory measures. They also point out that this process generates wasteful industries and practices that exist only to generate sufficient demand for products such as high-pressure advertisement to be sold at a profit, thereby creating rather than satisfying economic demand. Socialists argue that capitalism consists of irrational activity, such as the purchasing of commodities only to sell at a later time when their price appreciates, rather than for consumption, even if the commodity cannot be sold at a profit to individuals in need and therefore a crucial criticism often made by socialists is that "making money", or accumulation of capital, does not correspond to the satisfaction of demand (the production of use-values). The fundamental criterion for economic activity in capitalism is the accumulation of capital for reinvestment in production, but this spurs the development of new, non-productive industries that do not produce use-value and only exist to keep the accumulation process afloat (otherwise the system goes into crisis), such as the spread of the financial industry, contributing to the formation of economic bubbles. Such accumulation and reinvestment, when it demands a constant rate of profit, causes problems if the earnings in the rest of society do not increase in proportion.

Socialists view private property relations as limiting the potential of productive forces in the economy. According to socialists, private property becomes obsolete when it concentrates into centralised, socialised institutions not based on private appropriation of revenue—but based on cooperative work and internal planning in allocation of inputs—until the role of the capitalist becomes redundant. With no need for capital accumulation and a class of owners, private property in the means of production is perceived as being an outdated form of economic organisation that should be replaced by a free association of individuals based on public or common ownership of these socialised assets. Private ownership imposes constraints on planning, leading to uncoordinated economic decisions that result in business fluctuations, unemployment and a tremendous waste of material resources during crisis of overproduction.

Excessive disparities in income distribution lead to social instability and require costly corrective measures in the form of redistributive taxation, which incurs heavy administrative costs while weakening the incentive to work, inviting dishonesty and increasing the likelihood of tax evasion while (the corrective measures) reduce the overall efficiency of the market economy. These corrective policies limit the incentive system of the market by providing things such as minimum wages, unemployment insurance, taxing profits and reducing the reserve army of labour, resulting in reduced incentives for capitalists to invest in more production. In essence, social welfare policies cripple capitalism and its incentive system and are thus unsustainable in the long run. Marxists argue that the establishment of a socialist mode of production is the only way to overcome these deficiencies. Socialists and specifically Marxian socialists argue that the inherent conflict of interests between the working class and capital prevent optimal use of available human resources and leads to contradictory interest groups (labour and business) striving to influence the state to intervene in the economy in their favour at the expense of overall economic efficiency. Early socialists (utopian socialists and Ricardian socialists) criticised capitalism for concentrating power and wealth within a small segment of society. In addition, they complained that capitalism does not use available technology and resources to their maximum potential in the interests of the public.

=== Marxism ===
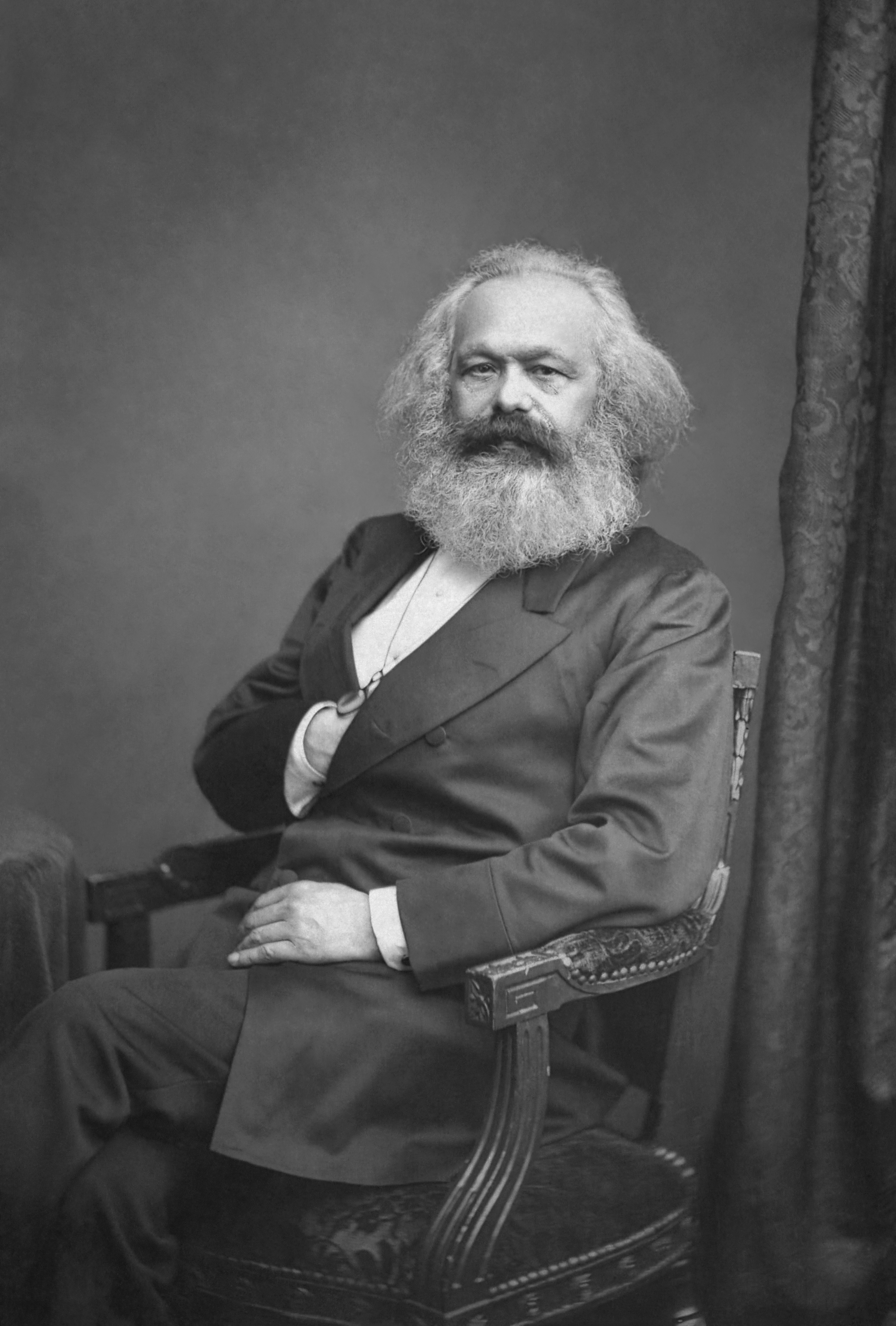
The writings of Karl Marx provided the basis for the development of Marxist political theory and Marxian economics.

At a certain stage of development, the material productive forces of society come into conflict with the existing relations of production or—this merely expresses the same thing in legal terms—with the property relations within the framework of which they have operated hitherto. Then begins an era of social revolution. The changes in the economic foundation lead sooner or later to the transformation of the whole immense superstructure.

— Karl Marx, Critique of the Gotha Program

Karl Marx and Friedrich Engels argued that socialism would emerge from historical necessity as capitalism rendered itself obsolete and unsustainable from increasing internal contradictions emerging from the development of the productive forces and technology. It was these advances in the productive forces combined with the old social relations of production of capitalism that would generate contradictions, leading to working-class consciousness.

Marx and Engels held the view that the consciousness of those who earn a wage or salary (the working class in the broadest Marxist sense) would be moulded by their conditions of wage slavery, leading to a tendency to seek their freedom or emancipation by overthrowing ownership of the means of production by capitalists and consequently, overthrowing the state that upheld this economic order. For Marx and Engels, conditions determine consciousness and ending the role of the capitalist class leads eventually to a classless society in which the state would wither away.

Marx and Engels used the terms socialism and communism interchangeably, but many later Marxists defined socialism as a specific historical phase that would displace capitalism and precede communism.

The major characteristics of socialism (particularly as conceived by Marx and Engels after the Paris Commune of 1871) are that the proletariat would control the means of production through a workers' state erected by the workers in their interests.

For orthodox Marxists, socialism is the lower stage of communism based on the principle of "from each according to his ability, to each according to his contribution", while upper stage communism is based on the principle of "from each according to his ability, to each according to his need", the upper stage becoming possible only after the socialist stage further develops economic efficiency and the automation of production has led to a superabundance of goods and services. Marx argued that the material productive forces (in industry and commerce) brought into existence by capitalism predicated a cooperative society since production had become a mass social, collective activity of the working class to create commodities but with private ownership (the relations of production or property relations). This conflict between collective effort in large factories and private ownership would bring about a conscious desire in the working class to establish collective ownership commensurate with the collective efforts their daily experience.

=== Role of the state ===
Socialists have taken different perspectives on the state and the role it should play in revolutionary struggles, in constructing socialism and within an established socialist economy.

In the 19th century, the philosophy of state socialism was first explicitly expounded by the German political philosopher Ferdinand Lassalle. In contrast to Karl Marx's perspective of the state, Lassalle rejected the concept of the state as a class-based power structure whose main function was to preserve existing class structures. Lassalle also rejected the Marxist view that the state was destined to "wither away". Lassalle considered the state to be an entity independent of class allegiances and an instrument of justice that would therefore be essential for achieving socialism.

Preceding the Bolshevik-led revolution in Russia, many socialists including reformists, orthodox Marxist currents such as council communism, anarchists and libertarian socialists criticised the idea of using the state to conduct central planning and own the means of production as a way to establish socialism. Following the victory of Leninism in Russia, the idea of "state socialism" spread rapidly throughout the socialist movement and eventually state socialism came to be identified with the Soviet economic model.

Joseph Schumpeter rejected the association of socialism and social ownership with state ownership over the means of production because the state as it exists in its current form is a product of capitalist society and cannot be transplanted to a different institutional framework. Schumpeter argued that there would be different institutions within socialism than those that exist within modern capitalism, just as feudalism had its own distinct and unique institutional forms. The state, along with concepts like property and taxation, were concepts exclusive to commercial society (capitalism) and attempting to place them within the context of a future socialist society would amount to a distortion of these concepts by using them out of context.

=== Utopian versus scientific ===
Utopian socialism is a term used to define the first currents of modern socialist thought as exemplified by the work of Henri de Saint-Simon, Charles Fourier and Robert Owen which inspired Karl Marx and other early socialists. Visions of imaginary ideal societies, which competed with revolutionary social democratic movements, were viewed as not being grounded in the material conditions of society and as reactionary. Although it is technically possible for any set of ideas or any person living at any time in history to be a utopian socialist, the term is most often applied to those socialists who lived in the first quarter of the 19th century who were ascribed the label "utopian" by later socialists as a negative term to imply naivete and dismiss their ideas as fanciful or unrealistic.

Religious sects whose members live communally such as the Hutterites are not usually called "utopian socialists", although their way of living is a prime example. They have been categorised as religious socialists by some. Similarly, modern intentional communities based on socialist ideas could also be categorised as "utopian socialist". For Marxists, the development of capitalism in Western Europe provided a material basis for the possibility of bringing about socialism because according to The Communist Manifesto "[w]hat the bourgeoisie produces above all is its own grave diggers", namely the working class, which must become conscious of the historical objectives set it by society.

=== Reform versus revolution ===
Revolutionary socialists believe that a social revolution is necessary to effect structural changes to the socioeconomic structure of society. Among revolutionary socialists there are differences in strategy, theory and the definition of revolution. Orthodox Marxists and left communists take an impossibilist stance, believing that revolution should be spontaneous as a result of contradictions in society due to technological changes in the productive forces. Lenin theorised that under capitalism the workers cannot achieve class consciousness beyond organising into trade unions and making demands of the capitalists. Therefore, Leninists argue that it is historically necessary for a vanguard of class conscious revolutionaries to take a central role in coordinating the social revolution to overthrow the capitalist state and eventually the institution of the state altogether. Revolution is not necessarily defined by revolutionary socialists as violent insurrection, but as a complete dismantling and rapid transformation of all areas of class society led by the majority of the masses: the working class.

Reformism is generally associated with social democracy and gradualist democratic socialism. Reformism is the belief that socialists should stand in parliamentary elections within capitalist society and if elected use the machinery of government to pass political and social reforms for the purposes of ameliorating the instabilities and inequities of capitalism. Within socialism, reformism is used in two different ways. One has no intention of bringing about socialism or fundamental economic change to society and is used to oppose such structural changes. The other is based on the assumption that while reforms are not socialist in themselves, they can help rally supporters to the cause of revolution by popularizing the cause of socialism to the working class.

The debate on the ability for social democratic reformism to lead to a socialist transformation of society is over a century old. Reformism is criticized for being paradoxical as it seeks to overcome the existing economic system of capitalism while trying to improve the conditions of capitalism, thereby making it appear more tolerable to society. According to Rosa Luxemburg, capitalism is not overthrown, "but is on the contrary strengthened by the development of social reforms". In a similar vein, Stan Parker of the Socialist Party of Great Britain argues that reforms are a diversion of energy for socialists and are limited because they must adhere to the logic of capitalism. French social theorist André Gorz criticized reformism by advocating a third alternative to reformism and social revolution that he called "non-reformist reforms", specifically focused on structural changes to capitalism as opposed to reforms to improve living conditions within capitalism or to prop it up through economic interventions.

== Culture ==
Under Socialism, solidarity will be the basis of society. Literature and art will be tuned to a different key.

— Trotsky, Literature and Revolution, 1924

In the Leninist conception, the role of the vanguard party was to politically educate the workers and peasants to dispel the societal false consciousness of institutional religion and nationalism that constitute the cultural status quo taught by the bourgeoisie to the proletariat to facilitate their economic exploitation of peasants and workers. Influenced by Lenin, the Central Committee of the Bolshevik Party stated that the development of the socialist workers' culture should not be "hamstrung from above" and opposed the Proletkult (1917–1925) organisational control of the national culture. Similarly, Trotsky viewed the party as transmitters of culture to the masses for raising the standards of education, as well as entry into the cultural sphere, but that the process of artistic creation in terms of language and presentation should be the domain of the practitioner. According to political scientist Baruch Knei-Paz in his book The Social and Political Thought of Leon Trotsky, this represented one of several distinctions between Trotsky's approach on cultural matters and Stalin's policy in the 1930s.

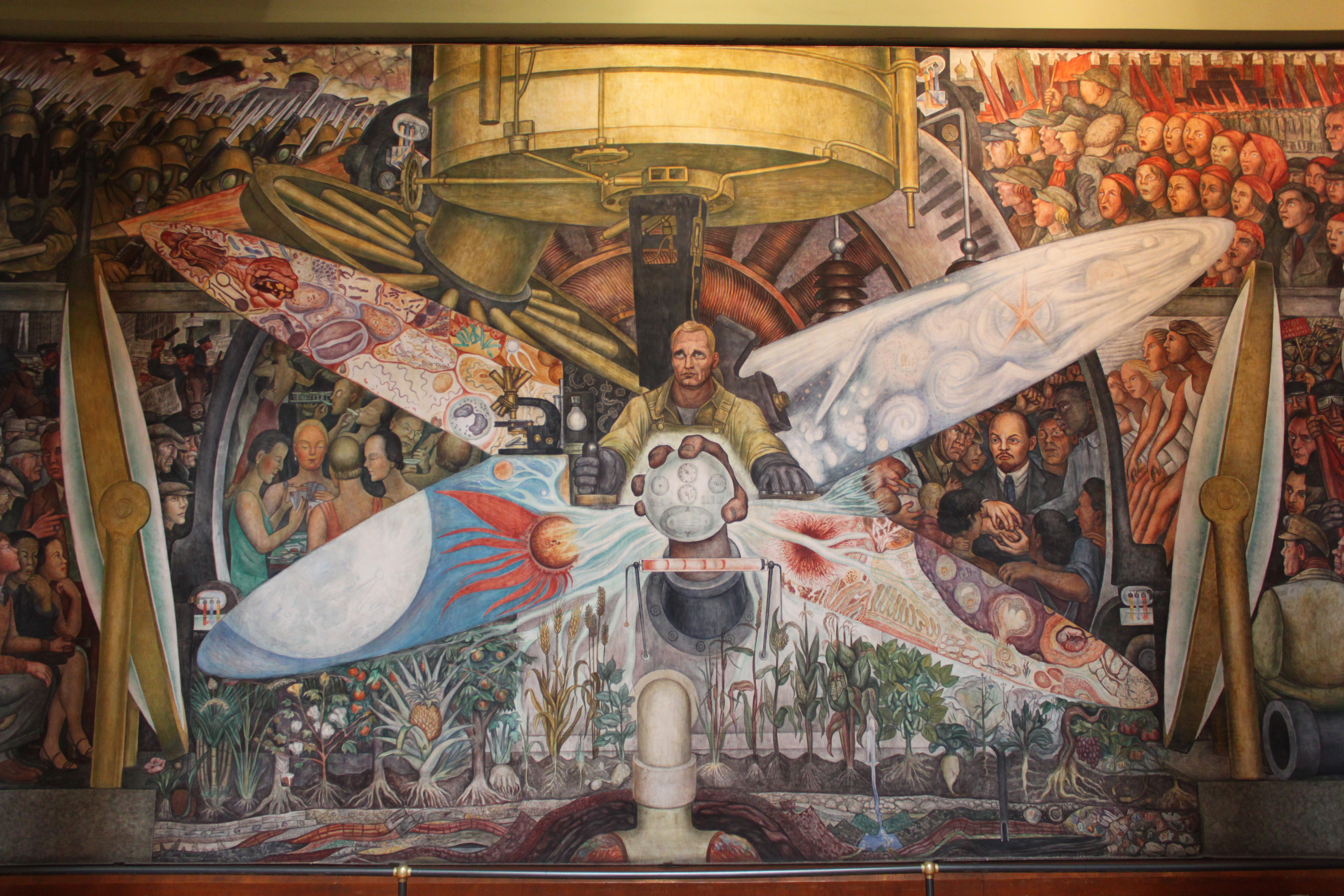
Man, Controller of the Universe produced by Mexican artist Diego Rivera

In Literature and Revolution, Trotsky examined aesthetic issues in relation to class and the Russian revolution. Soviet scholar Robert Bird considered his work as the "first systematic treatment of art by a Communist leader" and a catalyst for later, Marxist cultural and critical theories.

In "Problems of Everyday Life", a contemporaneous book which further articulated his views on culture and science, Trotsky argued that cultural development was a prerequisite for socialist reconstruction. In particular, he argued that cultural development would accentuate industrial and technical progress. He viewed both elements to be interrelated components as part of dialectical interaction in which he viewed the low level of Russian technique and expertise to be a function of cultural backwardness. According to Trotsky, Western industrial techniques and products such as the radio should not be rejected due to their status as a product of a capitalist system but rather absorbed into the Soviet socialist framework to facilitate new forms of techniques and cultural production. In this interpretation, the transference of techniques brought new cultural changes in terms of rationalism, efficiency, exactitude and quality.

Trotsky would later co-author the 1938 Manifesto for an Independent Revolutionary Art with the endorsement of prominent artists Andre Breton and Diego Rivera. Trotsky's writings on literature such as his 1923 survey which advocated tolerance, limited censorship and respect for literary tradition had strong appeal to the New York Intellectuals.

Prior to Stalin's rule, literary, religious and national representatives had some level of autonomy in Soviet Russia throughout the 1920s, but these groups were later rigorously repressed during the Stalinist era. Socialist realism was imposed under Stalin in artistic production and other creative industries such as music, film along with sports were subject to extreme levels of political control.

The counter-cultural phenomenon which emerged in the 1960s shaped the intellectual and radical outlook of the New Left; this movement placed a heavy emphasis on anti-racism, anti-imperialism and direct democracy in opposition to the dominant culture of advanced industrial capitalism. Socialist groups have also been closely involved with a number of counter-cultural movements such as Vietnam Solidarity Campaign, Stop the War Coalition, Love Music Hate Racism, Anti-Nazi League and Unite Against Fascism.

== Economics ==
Socialist economic models differ in the ownership of productive assets, the mechanisms used to allocate resources, and the governance of enterprises.

Social ownership may take public, cooperative, community, or employee forms; allocation may rely primarily on planning or on markets; and enterprises may be administered hierarchically or through worker self-management.

The original conception of socialism was an economic system whereby production was organised in a way to directly produce goods and services for their utility (or use-value in classical and Marxian economics), with the direct allocation of resources in terms of physical units as opposed to financial calculation and the economic laws of capitalism (see law of value), often entailing the end of capitalistic economic categories such as rent, interest, profit and money. In a fully developed socialist economy, production and balancing factor inputs with outputs becomes a technical process to be undertaken by engineers.

The economic anarchy of capitalist society as it exists today is, in my opinion, the real source of the evil. ... I am convinced there is only one way to eliminate these grave evils, namely through the establishment of a socialist economy, accompanied by an educational system which would be oriented toward social goals. In such an economy, the means of production are owned by society itself and are utilised in a planned fashion. A planned economy, which adjusts production to the needs of the community, would distribute the work to be done among all those able to work and would guarantee a livelihood to every man, woman, and child. The education of the individual, in addition to promoting his own innate abilities, would attempt to develop in him a sense of responsibility for his fellow men in place of the glorification of power and success in our present society.

— Albert Einstein, "Why Socialism?", 1949

Market socialism refers to an array of different economic theories and systems that use the market mechanism to organise production and to allocate factor inputs among socially owned enterprises, with the economic surplus (profits) accruing to society in a social dividend as opposed to private capital owners. Variations of market socialism include libertarian proposals such as mutualism, based on classical economics, and neoclassical economic models such as the Lange model.

The ownership of the means of production can be based on direct ownership by the users of the productive property through worker cooperative; or commonly owned by all of society with management and control delegated to those who operate/use the means of production; or public ownership by a state apparatus. Public ownership may refer to the creation of state-owned enterprises, nationalisation, municipalisation or autonomous collective institutions. Some socialists feel that in a socialist economy, at least the "commanding heights" of the economy must be publicly owned.

Management and control over the activities of enterprises are based on self-management and self-governance, with equal power-relations in the workplace to maximise occupational autonomy. A socialist form of organisation would eliminate controlling hierarchies so that only a hierarchy based on technical knowledge in the workplace remains. Every member would have decision-making power in the firm and would be able to participate in establishing its overall policy objectives. The policies/goals would be carried out by the technical specialists that form the coordinating hierarchy of the firm, who would establish plans or directives for the work community to accomplish these goals.

The role and use of money in a hypothetical socialist economy is a contested issue. Nineteenth century socialists including Karl Marx, Robert Owen, Pierre-Joseph Proudhon and John Stuart Mill advocated various forms of labour vouchers or labour credits, which like money would be used to acquire articles of consumption, but unlike money, they are unable to become capital and would not be used to allocate resources within the production process. Bolshevik revolutionary Leon Trotsky argued that money could not be arbitrarily abolished following a socialist revolution. Money had to exhaust its "historic mission", meaning it would have to be used until its function became redundant, eventually being transformed into bookkeeping receipts for statisticians and only in the more distant future would money not be required for even that role.

=== Planned economy ===
A planned economy is a type of economy consisting of a mixture of public ownership of the means of production and the coordination of production and distribution through economic planning. A planned economy can be either decentralised or centralised. Enrico Barone provided a comprehensive theoretical framework for a planned socialist economy. In his model, assuming perfect computation techniques, simultaneous equations relating inputs and outputs to ratios of equivalence would provide appropriate valuations to balance supply and demand.

The most prominent example of a planned economy was the economic system of the Soviet Union and as such the centralised-planned economic model is usually associated with the communist states of the 20th century, where it was combined with a single-party political system. In a centrally planned economy, decisions regarding the quantity of goods and services to be produced are planned in advance by a planning agency (see also the analysis of Soviet-type economic planning). The economic systems of the Soviet Union and the Eastern Bloc are further classified as "command economies", which are defined as systems where economic coordination is undertaken by commands, directives and production targets. Studies of the Soviet economy found that formal plans were extensively revised through bargaining among planning agencies, ministries, and enterprises. Some economists therefore describe the system as an administered or managed economy rather than as a fully planned economy.

Although central planning was largely supported by Marxist–Leninists, some factions within the Soviet Union before the rise of Stalinism held positions contrary to central planning. Leon Trotsky rejected central planning in favour of decentralised planning. He argued that central planners, regardless of their intellectual capacity, would be unable to coordinate effectively all economic activity within an economy because they operated without the input and tacit knowledge embodied by the participation of the millions of people in the economy. As a result, central planners would be unable to respond to local economic conditions.

=== Self-managed economy ===
Socialism, you see, is a bird with two wings. The definition is 'social ownership and democratic control of the instruments and means of production.'

— Upton Sinclair

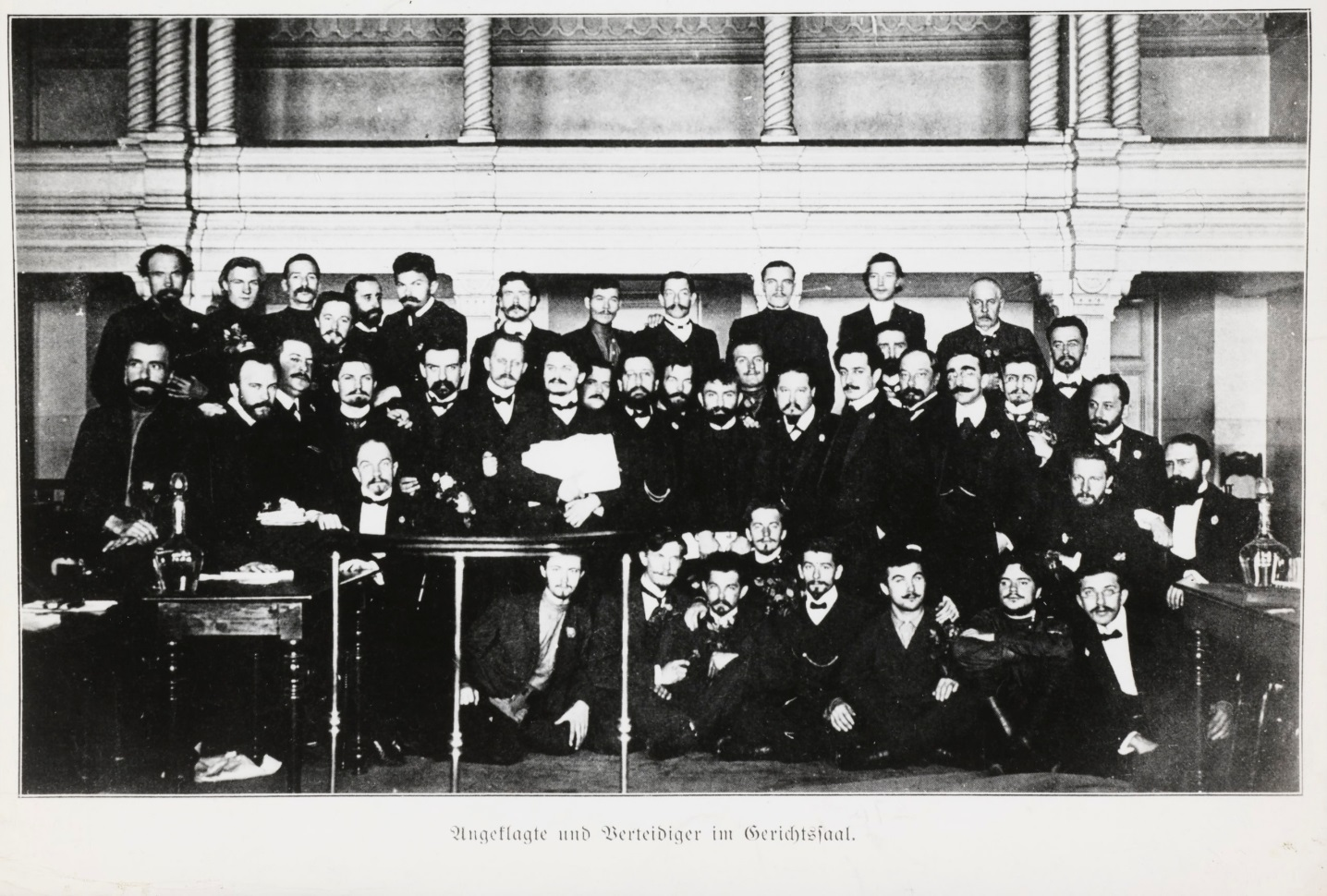
The Soviet of Workers' Deputies of St. Petersburg in 1905, Trotsky in the center. The soviets were an early example of a workers council.

A self-managed, decentralised economy is based on autonomous self-regulating economic units and a decentralised mechanism of resource allocation and decision-making. This model has found support in notable classical and neoclassical economists including Alfred Marshall, John Stuart Mill and Jaroslav Vaněk. There are numerous variations of self-management, including labour-managed firms and worker-managed firms. The goals of self-management are to eliminate exploitation and reduce alienation. Guild socialism is a political movement advocating workers' control of industry through the medium of trade-related guilds "in an implied contractual relationship with the public". It originated in the United Kingdom and was at its most influential in the first quarter of the 20th century. It was strongly associated with G. D. H. Cole and influenced by the ideas of William Morris.

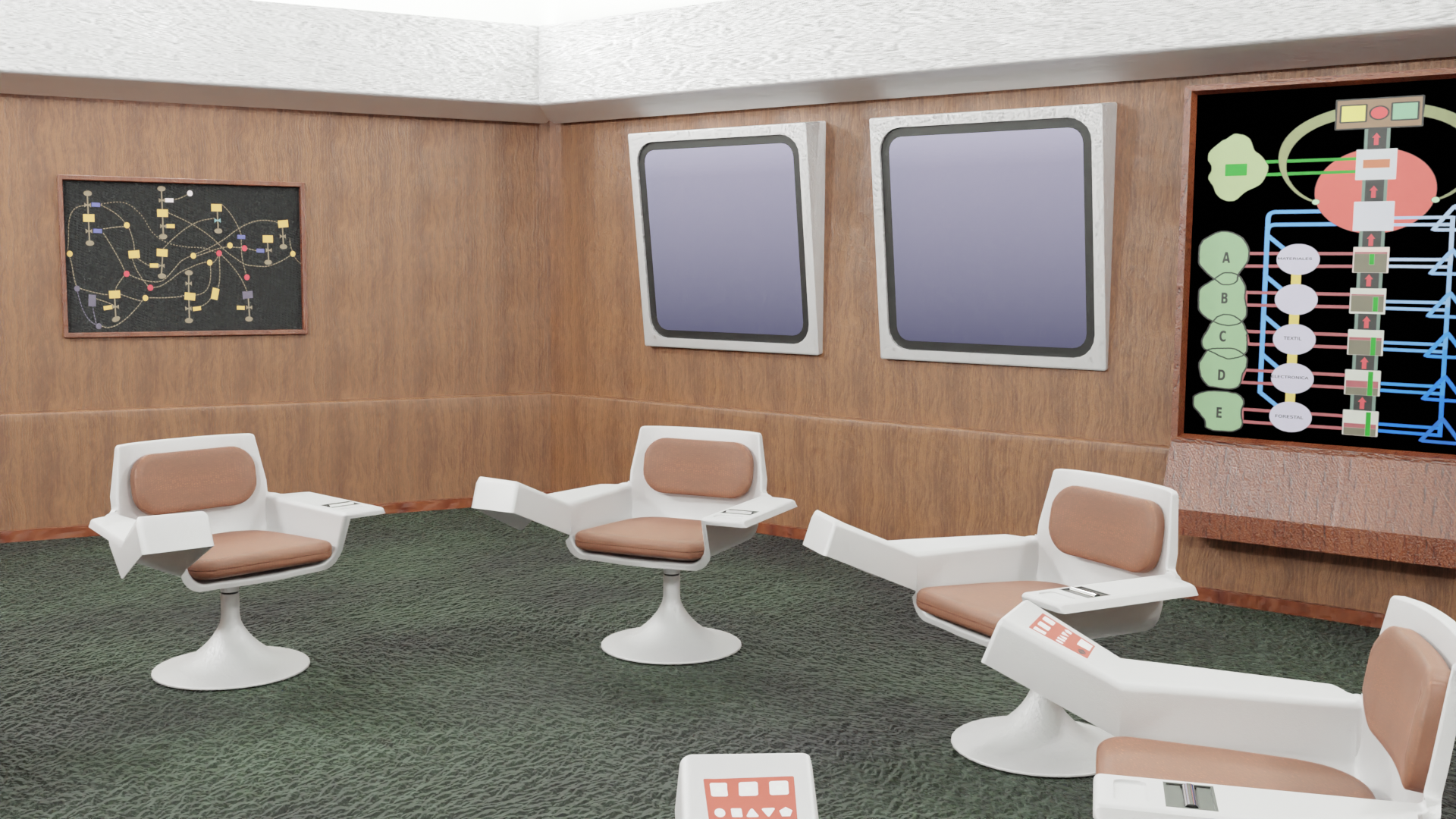
Project Cybersyn was an early form of computational economic planning

One such system is the cooperative economy, a largely free market economy in which workers manage the firms and democratically determine remuneration levels and labour divisions. Productive resources would be legally owned by the cooperative and rented to the workers, who would enjoy usufruct rights. Another form of decentralised planning is the use of cybernetics, or the use of computers to manage the allocation of economic inputs. The socialist-run government of Salvador Allende in Chile experimented with Project Cybersyn, a real-time information bridge between the government, state enterprises and consumers. This had been preceded by similar efforts to introduce a form of cybernetic economic planning as seen with the proposed OGAS system in the Soviet Union. The OGAS project was conceived to oversee a nationwide information network but was never implemented due to conflicting, bureaucratic interests. Another, more recent variant is participatory economics, wherein the economy is planned by decentralised councils of workers and consumers. Workers would be remunerated solely according to effort and sacrifice, so that those engaged in dangerous, uncomfortable and strenuous work would receive the highest incomes and could thereby work less. A contemporary model for a self-managed, non-market socialism is Pat Devine's model of negotiated coordination. Negotiated coordination is based upon social ownership by those affected by the use of the assets involved, with decisions made by those at the most localised level of production.

Michel Bauwens identifies the emergence of the open software movement and peer-to-peer production as a new alternative mode of production to the capitalist economy and centrally planned economy that is based on collaborative self-management, common ownership of resources and the production of use-values through the free cooperation of producers who have access to distributed capital.

Anarcho-communism is a theory of anarchism which advocates the abolition of the state, private property and capitalism in favour of common ownership of the means of production. Anarcho-syndicalism was practised in Catalonia and other places in the Spanish Revolution during the Spanish Civil War. Sam Dolgoff estimated that about eight million people participated directly or at least indirectly in the Spanish Revolution.

The economy of the former Socialist Federal Republic of Yugoslavia established a system based on market-based allocation, social ownership of the means of production and self-management within firms. This system substituted Yugoslavia's Soviet-type central planning with a decentralised, self-managed system after reforms in 1953.

The Marxian economist Richard D. Wolff argues that "re-organising production so that workers become collectively self-directed at their work-sites" not only moves society beyond both capitalism and state socialism of the last century, but would also mark another milestone in human history, similar to earlier transitions out of slavery and feudalism. As an example, Wolff claims that Mondragon is "a stunningly successful alternative to the capitalist organisation of production".

=== State-directed economy ===
State socialism can be used to classify any variety of socialist philosophies that advocates the ownership of the means of production by the state apparatus, either as a transitional stage between capitalism and socialism, or as an end-goal in itself. Typically, it refers to a form of technocratic management, whereby technical specialists administer or manage economic enterprises on behalf of society and the public interest instead of workers' councils or workplace democracy.

A state-directed economy may refer to a type of mixed economy consisting of public ownership over large industries, as promoted by various Social democratic political parties during the 20th century. This ideology influenced the policies of the British Labour Party during Clement Attlee's 1945 administration. In his biography of Attlee, Francis Beckett states: "[T]he government ... wanted what would become known as a mixed economy."

Nationalisation in the United Kingdom was achieved through compulsory purchase of the industry (i.e. with compensation). British Aerospace was a combination of major aircraft companies British Aircraft Corporation, Hawker Siddeley and others. British Shipbuilders was a combination of the major shipbuilding companies including Cammell Laird, Govan Shipbuilders, Swan Hunter and Yarrow Shipbuilders, whereas the nationalisation of the coal mines in 1947 created a coal board charged with running the coal industry commercially so as to be able to meet the interest payable on the bonds which the former mine owners' shares had been converted into.

=== Market socialism ===
Market socialism consists of publicly owned or cooperatively owned enterprises operating in a market economy. It is a system that uses the market and monetary prices for the allocation and accounting of the means of production, thereby retaining the process of capital accumulation. The profit generated would be used to directly remunerate employees, collectively sustain the enterprise or finance public institutions. In state-oriented forms of market socialism, in which state enterprises attempt to maximise profit, the profits can be used to fund government programs and services through a social dividend, eliminating or greatly diminishing the need for various forms of taxation that exist in capitalist systems. Neoclassical economist Léon Walras believed that a socialist economy based on state ownership of land and natural resources would provide a means of public finance to make income taxes unnecessary. Yugoslavia implemented a market socialist economy based on cooperatives and worker self-management. Some of the economic reforms introduced during the Prague Spring by Alexander Dubček, the leader of Czechoslovakia, included elements of market socialism.

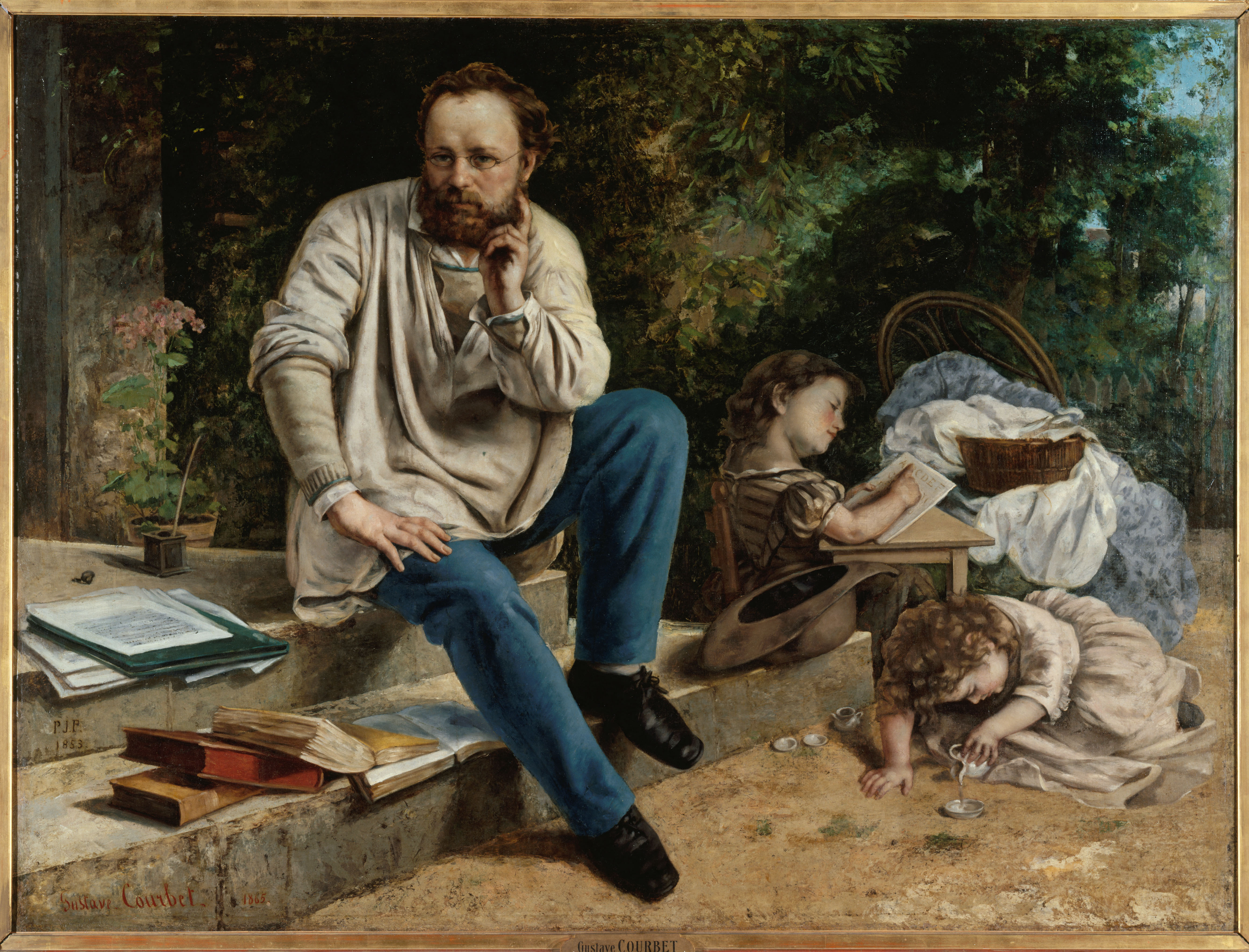
Pierre-Joseph Proudhon, main theorist of mutualism and influential French socialist thinker

Mutualism is an economic theory and anarchist school of thought that advocates a society where each person might possess a means of production, either individually or collectively, with trade representing equivalent amounts of labour in the free market. Integral to the scheme was the establishment of a mutual-credit bank that would lend to producers at a minimal interest rate, just high enough to cover administration. Mutualism is based on a labour theory of value that holds that when labour or its product is sold, in exchange it ought to receive goods or services embodying "the amount of labour necessary to produce an article of exactly similar and equal utility".

The current economic system in China is formally referred to as a socialist market economy with Chinese characteristics. It combines a large state sector that comprises the commanding heights of the economy, which are guaranteed their public ownership status by law, with a private sector mainly engaged in commodity production and light industry responsible from anywhere between 33% to over 70% of GDP generated in 2005. The current Chinese economy consists of 150 corporatised state-owned enterprises that report directly to China's central government. By 2008, these state-owned corporations had become increasingly dynamic and generated large increases in revenue for the state, resulting in a state-sector led recovery during the 2009 financial crises while accounting for most of China's economic growth. The Chinese economic model is widely cited as a contemporary form of state capitalism, the major difference between Western capitalism and the Chinese model being the degree of state-ownership of shares in publicly listed corporations. The Socialist Republic of Vietnam has adopted a similar model after the Doi Moi economic renovation but slightly differs from the Chinese model in that the Vietnamese government retains firm control over the state sector and strategic industries, but allows for private-sector activity in commodity production.

== Socialist policy programmes ==
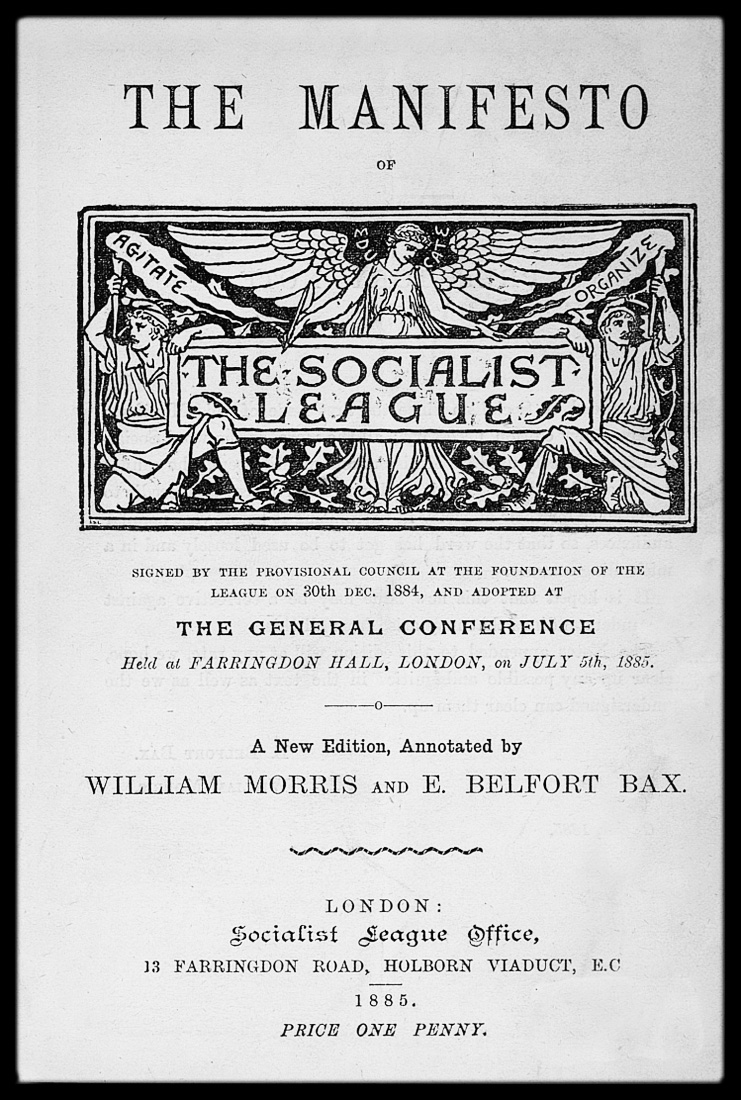
The Cover of the Manifesto of the Socialist League (UK, 1885), 1885

Conventionally, socialism has been primarily associated with the nationalisation or collective ownership of key industries. In specific contexts, socialism has also found political expression in an expansive range of policy measures such as sector-based minimum wage and greater labour protections. Western socialism in Europe has been characterised with an explicit focus on extending the sphere of industrial democracy, redistributive of wealth, internationalism and societal planning. Agrarian reform preoccupied the attention of 20th century socialist parties and unions in the developing world and was reflected in policies such as land redistribution and collectivisation. Nonetheless, this achieved limited progress due to a complexity of structural challenges which included organisational constraints on state capabilities and reconciling agricultural productivity with rural equality.

In the former Soviet Union and Eastern European states, the Communist party state had prioritised the public good with social welfare policies which secured full employment, universal healthcare, universal education, subsidised housing and cultural goods. These policies did not extinguish social inequalities but scholars largely agree that income inequality was considerably lower under Soviet-style state socialist systems than with other systems at comparable levels of industrial development.

Co-temporally, other Marxist Leninist regimes have introduced similar social and economic policies in their respective regions. In Cuba, the Castro government attempted to illegalise racial discrimination against Afro-Cubans which achieved substantial improvements but continual disparities have been identified in areas such as social mobility. The Communist government also enacted universal healthcare to redress the limited provision of medical services and low mortality levels across Cuba during the pre-revolutionary era. In China, policy orientation was directed at land reform, gender equality, eradication of illiteracy and the construction of infrastructure.

In recent decades, democratic socialist parties have incorporated ecological influences into their public programmes as seen with the US New Green Deal which provisionally sought large-scale mobilisation, the expansion of participatory democracy and modernisation of affordable, public transportation.

== Public views ==
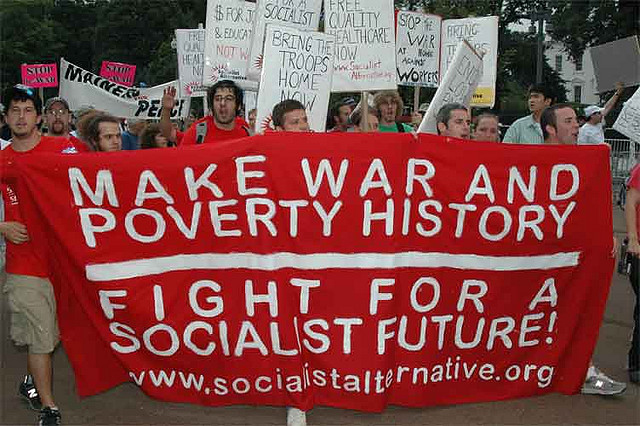
Socialist Alternative holding a mass anti-war protest, 2007

A multitude of polls have found significant levels of support for socialism among modern populations.

A 2018 IPSOS poll found that 50% of the respondents globally strongly or somewhat agreed that present socialist values were of great value for societal progress. In China, this was 84%, India 72%, Malaysia 62%, Turkey 62%, South Africa 57%, Brazil 57%, Russia 55%, Spain 54%, Argentina 52%, Mexico 51%, Saudi Arabia 51%, Sweden 49%, Canada 49%, Great Britain 49%, Australia 49%, Poland 48%, Chile 48%, South Korea 48%, Peru 48%, Italy 47%, Serbia 47%, Germany 45%, Belgium 44%, Romania 40%, United States 39%, France 31%, Hungary 28% and Japan 21%.

A 2021 survey conducted by the Institute of Economic Affairs (IEA) found that 67% of young British (16–24) respondents wanted to live in a socialist economic system, 72% supported the re-nationalisation of various industries such as energy, water along with railways and 75% agreed with the view that climate change was a specifically capitalist problem.

A 2023 IPSOS poll found that a majority of British public favoured public ownership of utilities including water, rail and electricity. Specifically, 68% of respondents favoured the nationalisation of water services, 65% supporting the nationalisation of the railways, 63% supporting the public ownership of power networks and 39% favouring broadband access which is operated by the government. The poll also found broad levels of support among traditional Labour and Conservative voters.

The results of a 2019 Axios poll found that 70% of US millennials were willing to vote for a socialist candidate and 50% of this same demographic had a somewhat or very unfavourable view of capitalism. Subsequently, another 2021 Axios poll found that 51% of 18–34 US adults had a positive view of socialism. Yet, 41% of Americans more generally had a positive view of socialism compared to 52% of those who viewing socialism more negatively.

In 2023, the Fraser Institute published findings which found that 42% of Canadians viewed socialism as the ideal system compared to 43% of British respondents, 40% Australian respondents and 31% American respondents. Overall support for socialism ranged from 50% of Canadians 18–24 year olds to 28% of Canadians over 55.

In 2025, a joint Rasmussen and Heartland Institute poll had found that 53% of young American voters (18–39 age range) supported the prospect of a socialist candidate running in the upcoming 2028 presidential election, and 76% of this same demographic favoured the nationalisation of key industries such as energy, healthcare and big tech sectors.

== Criticism ==
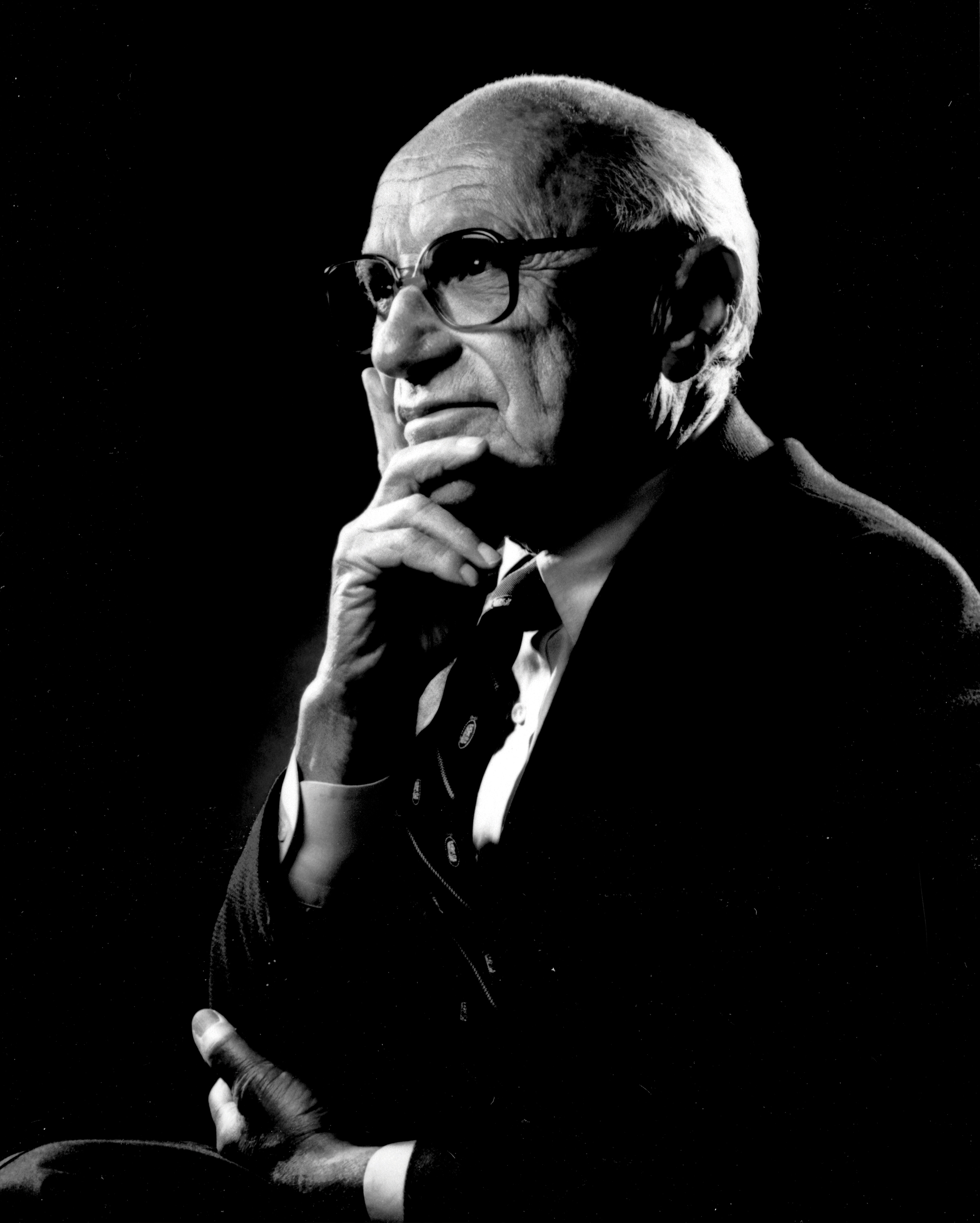
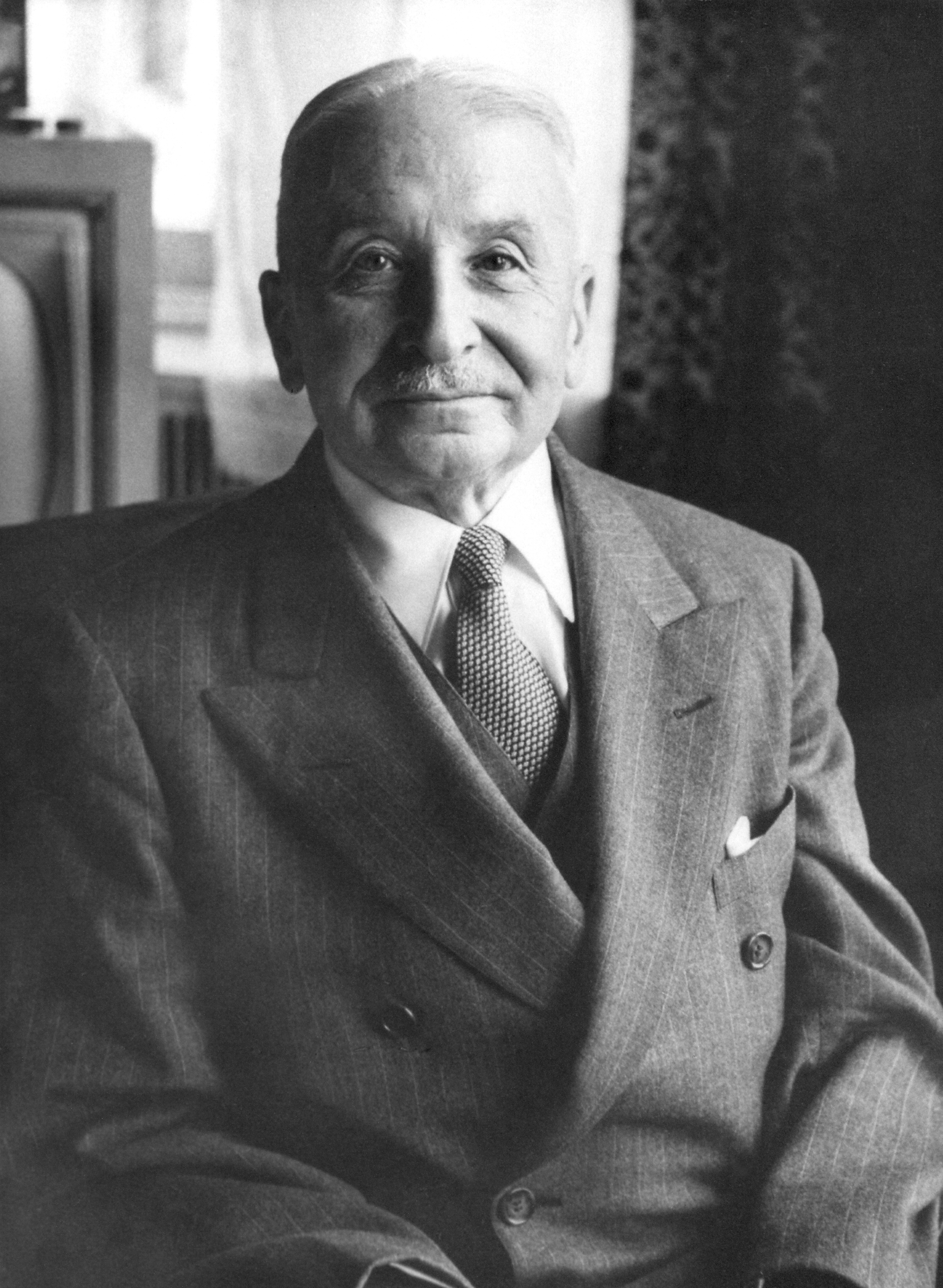
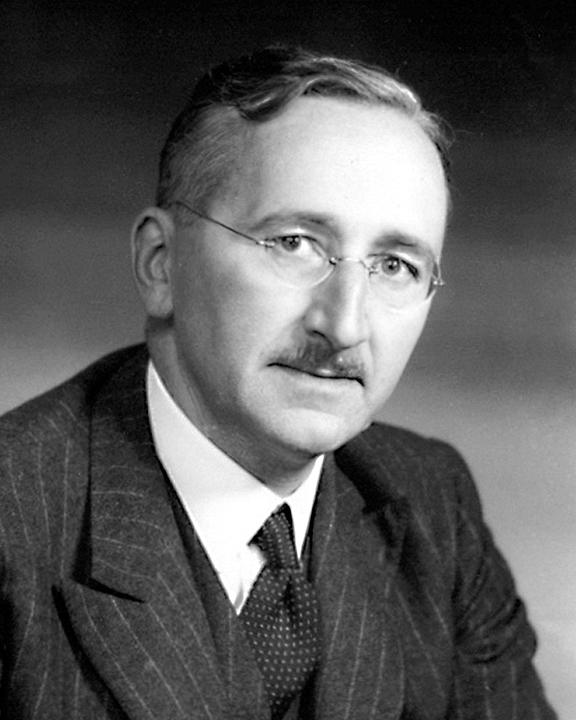
L–R: Milton Friedman, Ludwig von Mises and Friedrich Hayek, economists belonging to the Chicago and Austrian schools of economics and critics of socialism in the 20th century

According to analytical Marxist sociologist Erik Olin Wright, "The Right condemned socialism as violating individual rights to private property and unleashing monstrous forms of state oppression", while "the Left saw it as opening up new vistas of social equality, genuine freedom and the development of human potentials."

Because of socialism's many varieties, most critiques have focused on a specific approach. Proponents of one approach typically criticise others. Socialism has been criticised in terms of its models of economic organization as well as its political and social implications. Other critiques are directed at the socialist movement, parties, or existing states.

Some forms of criticism occupy theoretical grounds, such as in the economic calculation problem presented by proponents of the Austrian School as part of the socialist calculation debate, while others support their criticism by examining historical attempts to establish socialist societies. The economic calculation problem concerns the feasibility and methods of resource allocation for a planned socialist system. Central planning is also criticized by elements of the radical left. Libertarian socialist economist Robin Hahnel notes that even if central planning overcame its inherent inhibitions of incentives and innovation, it would nevertheless be unable to maximize economic democracy and self-management, which he believes are concepts that are more intellectually coherent, consistent and just than mainstream notions of economic freedom.

Economic liberals and right-libertarians argue that private ownership of the means of production and market exchange are natural entities or moral rights which are central to freedom and liberty and argue that the economic dynamics of capitalism are immutable and absolute. As such, they also argue that public ownership of the means of production and economic planning are infringements upon liberty.

Critics of socialism have argued that in any society where everyone holds equal wealth, there can be no material incentive to work because one does not receive rewards for a work well done. They further argue that incentives increase productivity for all people and that the loss of those effects would lead to stagnation. Some critics of socialism argue that income sharing reduces individual incentives to work and therefore incomes should be individualized as much as possible.

Peter Self criticized the aims of socialism, arguing that equality erodes away at individual diversities and that the establishment of an equal society would have to entail strong coercion.

Milton Friedman argued that the absence of private economic activity would enable political leaders to grant themselves coercive powers, powers that, under a capitalist system, would instead be granted by a capitalist class, which Friedman found preferable.

Many commentators on the political right point to the mass killings under communist regimes, claiming them as an indictment of socialism.

Opponents of this view, including supporters of socialism, state that these killings were aberrations caused by specific authoritarian regimes rather than socialism itself. They draw comparisons to killings, famines and excess deaths under capitalism, colonialism and anti-communist authoritarian governments.

Bhaskar Sunkara, the founding editor of the American socialist magazine Jacobin, argued that the appeal of socialism persists due to the inequality and "tremendous suffering" under current global capitalism, the use of wage labor "which rests on the exploitation and domination of humans by other humans," and ecological crises, such as climate change. Some in the scientific community have suggested that a contemporary radical response to social and ecological problems could be seen in the emergence of movements associated with degrowth, eco-socialism and eco-anarchism.

== See also ==
- Anarchism and socialism
- List of communist ideologies – Schools of thought on classless society
- List of socialist economists
- List of socialist parties with national parliamentary representation
- List of socialist songs
- List of socialist states – List of self-declared socialist states
- Marxian critique of political economy
- Paris Commune – 1871 revolutionary city council in France
- Scientific socialism – Social-political-economic theory
- Socialism by country (category)
- Social policy and cultural policy
- Socialist democracy – Form of democracy emphasizing socialism
- Spanish Revolution of 1936 – Workers' social revolution in the Spanish Republic
- Types of socialism – Variations of the economic philosophy
