= List of members of the Real Academia Española =

This article provides a list of all full members (académicos de número), past and present, of the Real Academia Española, the Spanish language regulator institution, as of July 1, 2006. Each member is elected for life by the rest of the academicians from among prestigious Spanish-language authors. Each academician has a seat assigned, labelled with a letter of the Spanish alphabet (distinguishing upper case and lower case).

== A seat ==
- Juan Manuel Fernández Pacheco, Marquis of Villena, founder and first director of the Academy, 1713–1725.
- Tomás Pascual de Azpeitia, 1726–1750.
- José Abreu Bertodano, Marquis de la Regalía, 1750–1775.
- Antonio Tavira y Almazán, 1775–1807.
- Eugenio de la Peña, 1807–1813.
- Eugenio de Tapia, 1814–1860.
- Severo Catalina del Amo, 1860–1871.
- Agustín Pascual, 1871–1884.
- Luis Pidal y Mon, Marquis of Pidal, 1884–1913.
- Juan Menéndez Pidal, 1914–1915.
- Mariano de Cavia, 1920. He did not hold office.
- Adolfo Bonilla y San Martín, 1921–1926.
- Vicente García de Diego, 1926–1978.
- Manuel Seco, 1980–2021
- Pedro Cátedra García, since 2024

== B seat ==
- Juan Ferreras, founder academician, 1713–1735.
- Jacinto de Mendoza, 1735–1747.
- García de Montoya, 1747–1759.
- Juan Trigueros, 1759–1777.
- Vicente Gutiérrez de los Ríos, 1777–1779.
- Francisco Capilla, 1779–1780.
- Manuel Uriarte de la Hoz, 1780–1798.
- Joaquín Juan Flores, 1798–1812.
- Juan Meléndez Valdés, 1812–1814.
- Agustín de Silva, Duke of Híjar, 1814–1817.
- José de Bucareli, 1817–1830.
- Eugenio de Guzmán, Count of Montijo, 1833–1834.
- Manuel Bretón de los Herreros, 1840–1873.
- Eduardo Saavedra, 1878–1912.
- Ricardo León y Román, 1915–1943.
- Narciso Alonso Cortés, 1946–1972.
- Emilio Alarcos Llorach, 1973–1998.
- Fernando Fernán Gómez, 2000–2007, actor
- José Luis Borau, 2008–2012.
- Aurora Egido, since 2014.

== C seat ==
- Gabriel Álvarez de Toledo, founder academician, 1713–1714.
- Alonso Rodríguez Castañón, 1714–1725.
- Andrés Fernández Pacheco, Marquis of Villena, 1725–1746.
- Francisco Antonio de Angulo, 1746–1775.
- Manuel de Lardizábal y Uribe, 1775–1814.
- Francisco Martínez de la Rosa, 1820–1862.
- Luis González Bravo, 1863–1871.
- Antonio de Benavides, 1872–1884.
- Cristino Martos, 1893. He didn't hold office..
- Miguel Colmeiro, 1893–1901.
- José María Asensio, 1904–1905.
- Antonio Fernández Grilo, 1906. He didn't hold office..
- Juan Vázquez de Mella, 1928. He didn't hold office..
- Ramón Pérez de Ayala, 1962. He didn't hold office..
- Luis Rosales, 1964–1992.
- Luis Goytisolo, since 1995.

== D seat ==
- Andrés González Barcia, founder academician, 1713–1743.
- Antonio Ventura de Prado, 1743–1754.
- Fernando Magallón, 1754–1781.
- Enrique Ramos, 1781–1797.
- Martín Fernández de Navarrete, 1797–1844.
- Manuel López Cepero, 1847–1858.
- Pedro Felipe Monlau, 1859–1871.
- Emilio Castelar, 1880–1899.
- Jacinto Octavio Picón, 1900–1923.
- José Francos Rodríguez, 1924–1931.
- Niceto Alcalá-Zamora, 1931–1949.
- Melchor Fernández Almagro, 1951–1966.
- Alonso Zamora Vicente, 1967–2006.
- Darío Villanueva, since 2006.

== E seat ==
- Juan Interián de Ayala, founder academician, 1713–1730.
- Casimiro Ustáriz, 1730–1751.
- Ignacio de Luzán, 1751–1754.
- Javier de Aguirre, Marquis of Montehermoso, 1754–1763.
- Pedro Rodríguez de Campomanes, 1763–1802.
- Antonio Ranz Romanillos, 1802–1830.
- José del Castillo y Ayensa, 1830–1861.
- Ramón de Campoamor, 1861–1901.
- José Ortega Munilla, 1902–1922.
- Joaquín Álvarez Quintero, 1925–1944.
- Juan Ignacio Luca de Tena, Marquis of Luca de Tena, 1946–1975.
- Gonzalo Torrente Ballester, 1977–1998.
- Carmen Iglesias, since 2002.

== F seat ==
- Bartolomé Alcázar, Societatis Iesu link, founder academician, 1713–1721.
- Lorenzo Folch de Cardona, 1724–1731.
- Carlos de la Reguera, 1731–1742.
- Agustín de Montiano y Luyando, 1742–1764.
- Felipe Samaniego, 1764–1796.
- Manuel Valbuena, 1796–1821.
- Cándido Beltrán de Caicedo, 1822–1826.
- José Musso y Valiente, 1831–1838.
- Ventura de la Vega, 1845–1865.
- Cayetano Fernández, 1871–1901.
- Juan Antonio Cavestany, 1902–1924.
- Eduardo Gómez de Baquero, 1925–1929.
- Ignacio Bolívar, 1931–1944.
- Emilio Fernández Galiano, 1948–1953.
- Julio Rey Pastor, 1953–1962.
- Manuel Halcón, Marquis of Villar de Tajo, 1962–1989.
- José Luis Sampedro, 1991–2013, economist and writer
- Manuel Gutiérrez Aragón, since 2016.

== G seat ==
- José Casani, founder academician, 1713–1750.
- José Carrasco, 1750–1768.
- Tomás Antonio Sánchez, 1768–1802.
- José Antonio Conde, 1802–1814. He changed to N seat in 1818.
- Juan Pérez Villamil, 1814–1824.
- Vicente González Arnao, 1831–1845.
- Patricio de la Escosura, 1847–1878.
- Emilio Alcalá Galiano, Count of Casa–Valencia, 1879–1914.
- Pedro de Novo y Colson, 1915–1931.
- Eduardo Marquina, 1931–1946.
- José María de Cossío, 1948–1977.
- Manuel Díez-Alegría, 1980–1987.
- José María de Areilza, Count of Motrico, 1987–1998.
- José Hierro, 2002. He didn't hold office.
- José Manuel Sánchez Ron, since 2003.

== H seat ==
- Antonio Dongo Barnuevo, founder academician, 1713–1722.
- Juan Isidro Fajardo, 1723–1726.
- Pedro Serrano Varona, 1727–1738.
- Pedro González, 1738–1758.
- Juan Chindurza, 1758–1763.
- Miguel Pérez Pastor, 1763–1763.
- Bernardo de Iriarte, 1763––1814.
- José Munárriz, 1814–1830.
- Alberto Lista, 1833–1848.
- José Zorrilla. He didn't hold office and his seat was considered vacant. He was nominated again for L seat in 1885.
- Fermín de la Puente y Apezechea, 1850–1875.
- Pedro Antonio de Alarcón, 1877–1881.
- Francisco Asenjo Barbieri, 1892–1894.
- Segismundo Moret, 1894–1913. He didn't hold office..
- Serafín Álvarez Quintero, 1920–1938.
- Federico García Sanchiz, 1941–1964.
- Martín de Riquer Morera, Count of Casa Dávalos, 1965–2013.
- Félix de Azúa, since 2016.

== I seat ==
- Francisco Pizarro, Marquis of San Juan, 1713–1736.
- José Torrero y Marzo, 1736–1763.
- Gaspar de Montoya, 1763–1801.
- Francisco Patricio Berguizas, 1801–1810.
- Diego Clemencín, 1814–1834.
- Jerónimo del Campo, 1839–1861.
- Juan Valera, 1862–1905.
- Santiago Ramón y Cajal, 1934. He didn't hold office..
- Blas Cabrera, 1936–1945.
- Gerardo Diego, 1948–1987.
- Claudio Rodríguez, 1992–1999.
- Luis Mateo Díez, since 2001.

== J seat ==
- José de Solís y Gante, Duke of Montellano, 1713–1763.
- Vicente de Vera, Duke of la Roca, 1763–1813.
- Manuel José Quintana, 1814–1857.
- Leopoldo Augusto de Cueto, Marquis of Valmar, 1858–1901.
- Juan José Herranz y Gonzalo, Count of Reparaz, 1902–1912.
- Augusto González Besada, 1916–1919.
- Julio Casares, 1921–1964.
- Luis Ceballos y Fernández de Córdoba, 1965–1967.
- Antonio Tovar, 1968–1985.
- Francisco Nieva, 1990–2016.
- Carlos García Gual, since 2019.

== K seat ==
- Vincencio Squarzafigo Centurión y Arriola, 1713–1737.
- Francisco Manuel de Mata Linares, 1737–1780.
- Juan Pablo de Aragón y Azlor, Duke of Villahermosa, 1780–1790.
- Antonio Porlier, Marquis of Bajamar, 1790–1813.
- José Vargas Ponce, 1814–1821.
- Juan Bautista Arriaza, 1829–1837.
- Mariano Roca de Togores, Marquis of Molins, 1841–1889.
- Francisco Silvela, 1893–1905.
- Cristóbal Pérez Pastor, 1908. He didn't hold office..
- Andrés Mellado y Fernández, 1909–1913.
- Francisco Fernández de Béthencourt, 1914–1916.
- Juan Armada y Losada, Marquis of Figueroa, 1918–1932.
- Gregorio Marañón, 1934–1960, medical doctor and historian
- Samuel Gili Gaya, 1961–1976.
- Miguel Mihura, 1977, playwright. He didn't hold office.
- Carmen Conde, 1979–1996.
- Ana María Matute, 1998–2014.
- Federico Corriente Córdoba, 2018–2020.
- José María Bermúdez de Castro, since 2022.

== L seat ==
- Adrián Conink, 1713–1728.
- Diego Suárez de Figueroa, 1728–1743.
- Manuel Villegas y Oyarvide, 1743–1746.
- Francisco de la Huerta y Vega, 1746–1752.
- Pedro de Guzmán, Duke of Medinasidonia, 1752–1779.
- José Guevara Vasconcelos, 1779–1804.
- Vicente González Arnao, 1804. He changed to G seat in 1831.
- José Gabriel de Silva Bazán, Marquis of Santa Cruz, 1814–1839.
- Bernardino Fernández de Velasco, 14th Duke of Frías, 1839–1851.
- José Caveda y Nava, 1852–1882.
- José Zorrilla, 1885–1893.
- Ceferino González y Díaz Tuñón, 1894. He didn't hold office..
- Cipriano Muñoz y Manzano, Count of la Viñaza, 1895–1933.
- Ramiro de Maeztu, 1935–1936.
- Eugenio Montes, 1978–1982.
- Juan Rof Carballo, 1984–1994.
- Mario Vargas Llosa, 1996–2025.

== M seat ==
- Juan de Villademoros Rico y Castrillón, 1713–1723.
- Miguel Perea, 1724–1747.
- Antonio Gaspar de Pinedo, 1747–1756.
- Jerónimo Puig, 1756–1763.
- Pedro Francisco de Luján y Silva, Duke of Almodóvar, 1763–1794.
- Juan Crisóstomo Ramírez Alamanzón, 1794–1814.
- José Duaso, 1814–1849.
- Javier de Quinto, Count of Quinto, 1850–1860.
- Francisco Cutanda, 1861–1875.
- Tomás de Corral y Oña, Marquis of San Gregorio, 1879–1882.
- Marcelino Aragón y Azlor, Duke of Villahermosa, 1884–1888.
- Francisco Commelerán, 1890–1919.
- Emilio Gutiérrez-Gamero, 1920–1936.
- Salvador de Madariaga, 1976–1978.
- Carlos Bousoño, 1980–2015.
- Juan Mayorga, since 2019.

== N seat ==
- Vicente Bacallar, Marquis of San Felipe, founder academician 1713–1726.
- Francisco Antonio Zapata, 1726–1754.
- José de Rada y Aguirre, 1754–1760.
- Vicente García de la Huerta, 1760–1787.
- Pío Ignacio Lamo y Palacios, Count of Castañeda, 1787–1818.
- José Antonio Conde, 1818–1820.
- Ramón Cabrera, 1820–1833.
- Eusebio María del Valle, 1836–1867.
- Frutos Saavedra Meneses, 1868. He didn't hold office.
- Salustiano de Olózaga, 1871–1873.
- León Galindo y de Vera, 1875–1889.
- Benito Pérez Galdós, 1897–1920.
- Leonardo Torres Quevedo, 1920–1936.
- Manuel Machado, 1936–1947.
- Francisco Javier Sánchez Cantón, 1949–1971.
- Torcuato Luca de Tena, Marquis of Luca de Tena, 1973–1999.
- Guillermo Rojo, since 2001.

== O seat ==
- Gonzalo Machado, 1714–1732.
- Diego de Villegas y Saavedra Quevedo, 1733–1751.
- José de Carvajal y Lancáster, 1751–1774.
- Fernando de Silva, 12th Duke of Alba, 1774–1776.
- José Bazán de Silva y Sarmiento, Marquis of Santa Cruz, 1776–1802.
- Manuel Abella, 1802–1817.
- Ramón Chimioni, 1817–1818.
- Agustín García de Arrieta, 1818–1835.
- Juan González Cabo-Reluz, 1841–1858.
- Manuel Tamayo y Baus, 1859–1898.
- Emilio Ferrari, 1905–1907, poet
- Melchor de Palau, 1908–1910.
- Julián Ribera, 1912–1934.
- Salvador Bermúdez de Castro y O'Lawlor, Marquis of Lema, 1935–1945.
- Félix de Llanos y Torriglia, 1945–1949.
- Vicente Aleixandre, 1950–1984, poet
- Pere Gimferrer, since 1985, poet

== P seat ==
- Jerónimo Pardo, 1714–1740.
- Alonso Verdugo de Castilla, Count of Torrepalma, 1740–1767.
- Ignacio de Hermosilla, 1767–1802.
- Casimiro Flórez Canseco, 1802–1816.
- Agustín José Mestre, 1817–1836.
- Antonio Gil y Zárate, 1841–1861.
- Antonio García Gutiérrez, 1862–1884.
- Miguel Mir, 1886–1912.
- Juan Navarro Reverter, 1914–1924.
- José Martínez Ruiz, 1924–1967.
- Guillermo Díaz-Plaja, 1967–1984.
- Julio Caro Baroja, 1986–1995, anthropologist
- Ángel González Muñiz, 1997–2008, poet
- Inés Fernández-Ordóñez, since 2011

== Q seat ==
- Mercurio Antonio López Pacheco, Marquis of Villena, 1714–1738.
- Juan López Pacheco, Marquis of Villena, 1739–1751.
- Martín de Ulloa, 1751–1787.
- Antonio Porcel, 1787–1832.
- Juan Nicasio Gallego, 1833–1853.
- Antonio Ferrer del Río, 1853–1872.
- Antonio Arnao, 1873–1889.
- Francisco Fernández y González, 1894–1917.
- Fidel Fita, 1918. He didn't hold office..
- Javier Ugarte, 1918–1919.
- Manuel Linares Rivas, 1921–1938.
- Rafael Estrada y Arnáiz, 1945–1956.
- Camilo José Cela, Marquis of Iria Flavia, 1957–2002, novelist
- Carlos Castilla del Pino, 2004–2009, neurologist, psychiatrist, essayist
- Pedro Álvarez de Miranda, since 2011

== R seat ==
- Juan Curiel, 1714–1775.
- Antonio Mateos Murillo, 1775–1791.
- Ramón Cabrera, 1791. He changed to N seat in 1820.
- José Miguel de Carvajal y Vargas Manrique de Lara, Duke of San Carlos, 1814–1828.
- Javier de Burgos, 1830–1848.
- Juan Donoso Cortés, Marquis of Valdegamas, 1848–1853.
- Rafael María Baralt, 1853–1860.
- Tomás Rodríguez y Díaz Rubí, 1860–1890.
- Antonio María Fabié, 1891–1899.
- Ángel María Dacarrete, 1904. He didn't hold office..
- José Canalejas, 1912. He didn't hold office..
- Enrique Aguilera y Gamboa, Marquis of Cerralbo, 1922. He didn't hold office..
- Juan Gualberto López-Valdemoro y de Quesada, Count of las Navas, 1924–1935.
- Enrique Díez-Canedo, 1935–1944.
- Luis Martínez Kleiser, 1944–1971.
- Fernando Lázaro Carreter, 1972–2004.
- Javier Marías, 2008–2022.
- Javier Cercas, 2024

== S seat ==
- Luis Curiel, 1714–1724.
- Tomás de Montes y Corral, 1724–1744.
- Tiburcio de Aguirre Salcedo, 1744–1767.
- José Vela, 1767–1800.
- Francisco Martínez Marina, 1800–1833.
- Marcial Antonio López, baron of La Joyosa, 1836–1857.
- Manuel Cañete, 1858–1891.
- Santiago de Liniers, Count of Liniers, 1891–1908.
- José Alemany y Bolufer, 1909–1934.
- Wenceslao Fernández Flórez, 1945–1964.
- Julián Marías, 1965–2005, philosopher and essayist
- Salvador Gutiérrez Ordóñez, since 2008.

== T seat ==
- Jaime de Solís, 1714–1720.
- Pedro Manuel de Azevedo, 1721–1734.
- Lope Hurtado de Mendoza, 1734–1747.
- Ignacio de Ceballos, 1747–1784.
- José Miguel de Flores, 1784–1790.
- Pedro Téllez Girón, Duke of Osuna, 1790–1808.
- Demetrio Ortiz, 1808–1845.
- Félix Torres Amat, 1847–1847.
- Jaime Balmes, 1848. He didn't hold office..
- José Joaquín de Mora, 1848–1864.
- Antonio de los Ríos y Rosas, 1871–1873.
- Gaspar Núñez de Arce, 1873–1903.
- Eduardo de Hinojosa, 1904–1919.
- Manuel de Sandoval, 1920–1932.
- Miguel de Unamuno, 1936. He didn't hold office..
- Isidro Gomá y Tomás, archbishop of Toledo, 1940. He didn't hold office..
- Manuel Gómez-Moreno, 1942–1970.
- Carlos Clavería Lizana, 1972–1974.
- Manuel Alvar, 1975–2001.
- Arturo Pérez-Reverte, since 2003, journalist and novelist

== U seat ==
- Manuel de Fuentes, 1714–1716.
- José Montealegre y Andrade, Marquis of Salas, 1720–1771.
- Benito Bails, 1777–1797.
- Juan de Sahagún de la Mata, Count of El Carpio, 1797–1801.
- Nicasio Álvarez de Cienfuegos, 1801–1809.
- Lorenzo de Carvajal, 1814–1830.
- Juan Pablo Pérez Caballero, 1830–1836.
- Mateo Seoane, 1841–1870.
- Manuel Silvela, 1871–1892.
- Francisco García Ayuso, 1894–1897.
- Isidoro Fernández Flórez, 1898–1902.
- Antonio Maura, 1903–1925.
- Leopoldo Eijo Garay, 1927–1963.
- Alfonso García Valdecasas, 1965–1993.
- Eduardo García de Enterría, 1994–2013.
- Clara Janés, since 2016, poet.

== V seat ==
- Manuel Villegas Piñateli, 1714–1752, publisher, (1736) of 2 vols., (History/Travels in Russia).
- Javier Arias Dávila y Centurión, Count of Puñonrostro and Marquis of Casasola, 1752–1783.
- Gaspar Melchor de Jovellanos, 1783–1811.
- Tomás González Carvajal, 1814–1833.
- Joaquín Ignacio Mencos y Manso de Zúñiga, Count of Guenduláin, 1841–1882.
- Alejandro Pidal y Mon, 1883–1913.
- Miguel Echegaray, 1916–1927.
- Antonio Machado, 1939. He didn't hold office..
- Emilio García Gómez, 1945–1995.
- Juan Luis Cebrián, since 1997, journalist

== X seat ==
- Pedro Verdugo de Albornoz Ursúa, Count of Torrepalma, 1715–1720.
- Fernando de Bustillos y Azcona, 1721–1730.
- Manuel Pellicer de Velasco, 1730–1733.
- Blas Antonio de Nasarre, 1733–1751.
- José Velasco, 1751–1767.
- Juan de Aravaca, 1767–1786.
- Diego Antonio Rejón de Silva, 1786–1796.
- Joaquín Lorenzo Villanueva, 1796–1837.
- Jerónimo de la Escosura, 1844–1855.
- Aureliano Fernández-Guerra, 1860–1894.
- Eugenio Sellés, Marquis of Gerona, 1895–1926.
- Rafael Sánchez Mazas, 1966. He didn't hold office..
- Antonio Rodríguez Moñino, 1968–1970.
- Antonio Buero Vallejo, 1972–2000, playwright
- Francisco Brines, 2006–2021, poet
- Clara Sánchez, since 2023.

== Z seat ==
- Pedro Scotti de Agóiz, 1715–1728.
- Miguel Gutiérrez de Valdivia, 1728–1747.
- Juan de Iriarte, 1747–1771.
- Pedro de Silva y Sarmiento, 1771–1808.
- Francisco Antonio González, 1808–1833.
- José de la Revilla, 1839–1859.
- Cándido Nocedal, 1859–1885.
- Eduardo Benot, 1889–1907.
- José Rodríguez Carracido, 1908–1928.
- Agustín González de Amezúa, 1929–1956.
- Agustín de Foxá, Count of Foxá, 1959. He didn't hold office..
- Salvador Fernández Ramírez, 1960–1983.
- Francisco Ayala, 1984–2009.
- José Luis Gómez, since 2014, actor.

== a seat ==
- Juan de La Pezuela y Ceballos, Count of Cheste, 1847–1906.
- Antonio Hernández y Fajarnés, 1909–1909.
- Leopoldo Cano y Masas, 1910–1934.
- Pío Baroja, 1935–1956.
- Juan Antonio de Zunzunegui y Loredo, 1960–1982.
- Elena Quiroga de Abarca, 1984–1995.
- Domingo Ynduráin Muñoz, 1997–2003.
- Pedro García Barreno, since 2006.

== b seat ==
- Joaquín Francisco Pacheco, 1847–1865.
- José de Selgas y Carrasco, 1874–1882.
- Víctor Balaguer, 1883–1901.
- Ramón Menéndez Pidal, 1902–1968.
- Vicente Enrique y Tarancón, 1970–1994.
- Eliseo Álvarez-Arenas Pacheco, 1996–2009.
- Jesus Rafael Bello Brito, 2010–2012.
- Miguel Sáenz Sagaseta de Ilúrdoz, since 2013.

== c seat ==
- Ángel Saavedra, Duke of Rivas, 1847–1865.
- Antonio Cánovas del Castillo, 1867–1897.
- Daniel de Cortázar, 1899–1927.
- Amalio Gimeno, Count of Gimeno, 1927–1936.
- Pedro Sáinz Rodríguez, 1979–1986.
- Manuel Fernández-Galiano Fernández, 1988. He didn't hold office.
- Ricardo Gullón, 1990–1991.
- Víctor García de la Concha, since 1992.

== d seat ==
- Agustín Durán, 1847–1862.
- Enrique Ramírez de Saavedra y de Cueto, Duke of Rivas, 1863–1914.
- Miguel Asín Palacios, 1919–1944.
- Dámaso Alonso, 1948–1990.
- Francisco Rodríguez Adrados, 1991–2020.
- Dolores Corbella, since 2023.

== e seat ==
- Ramón de Mesonero Romanos, 1847–1882.
- José Echegaray, 1894–1916.
- Julio Burell, 1919. He didn't hold office.
- Gabriel Maura y Gamazo, Duke of Maura, 1920–1963.
- Julio Guillén Tato, 1963–1972.
- Miguel Delibes Setién, 1975–2010, novelist.
- Juan Gil Fernández, since 2011.

== f seat ==
- Antonio Alcalá Galiano, 1847–1865.
- Adelardo López de Ayala y Herrera, 1870–1879.
- Gabino Tejado, 1881–1891.
- Federico Balart, 1905. He didn't hold office.
- Valentín Gómez, 1907–1907.
- Luis Coloma, 1908–1915.
- Wenceslao Ramírez de Villa-Urrutia, Marquis of Villa-Urrutia, 1916–1933.
- Miguel Artigas, 1935–1947.
- Carlos Martínez de Campos, Duke of La Torre, 1950–1975.
- Manuel de Terán Álvarez, 1977–1984.
- Jesús Aguirre y Ortiz de Zárate, Duke of Alba, 1986–2001.
- Luis Ángel Rojo, 2003–2011, economist.
- José B. Terceiro Lomba, since 2012, economist.

== g seat ==
- Pedro José Pidal, Marquis of Pidal, 1847–1865.
- Antonio Aparisi y Guijarro, 1872. He didn't hold office..
- José Godoy Alcántara, 1875. He didn't hold office..
- Vicente Barrantes, 1876–1898.
- Raimundo Fernández Villaverde, Marquis of Pozo Rubio, 1902–1905.
- Francisco Rodríguez Marín, 1907–1943.
- Esteban Terradas Illa, 1946–1950.
- Julio Palacios Martínez, 1953–1970.
- Antonio Colino López, 1972–2008.
- Soledad Puértolas Villanueva, since 2010, novelist.

== h seat ==
- Eugenio de Ochoa, 1847–1872.
- Luis Fernández-Guerra y Orbe, 1873–1890.
- Manuel del Palacio, 1894–1906.
- Francisco Codera y Zaidín, 1910–1917.
- Carlos María Cortezo, 1918–1933.
- Tomás Navarro Tomás, 1935–1979.
- Emilio Lorenzo Criado, 1981–2002.
- José Manuel Blecua Perdices, since 2006.

== i seat ==
- Antonio María Segovia, 1847–1874.
- Pedro de Madrazo, 1881–1898.
- Emilio Cotarelo y Mori, 1900–1936.
- José María Pemán y Pemartín, 1939–1981.
- José García Nieto, 1983–2001.
- Margarita Salas Falgueras, 2003–2019.
- Paloma Díaz-Mas, since 2022.

== j seat ==
- Alejandro Oliván, 1847–1878.
- Mariano Catalina, 1881–1913.
- Manuel de Saralegui y Medina, 1914–1926.
- Jacobo Fitz-James Stuart Falcó Portocarrero y Osorio, Duke of Berwick and of Alba, 1943–1953.
- Pedro Laín Entralgo, 1954–2001.
- Álvaro Pombo García de los Ríos, since 2004.

== k seat ==
- Nicomedes Pastor Díaz, 1847–1863.
- Isaac Núñez de Arenas, 1863–1869.
- Francisco de Paula Canalejas, 1869–1883.
- José de Castro y Serrano, 1889–1896.
- José María de Pereda, 1897–1906.
- Armando Palacio Valdés, 1920–1938.
- Ángel González Palencia, 1940–1949.
- Rafael Lapesa Melgar, 1954–2001.
- José Antonio Pascual Rodríguez, since 2002.

== l seat ==
- Juan Eugenio Hartzenbusch, 1847–1880.
- Marcelino Menéndez y Pelayo, 1880–1912.
- Jacinto Benavente, 1954. He didn't hold office..
- Salvador González Anaya, 1948–1955.
- Joaquín Calvo-Sotelo, 1955–1993.
- Emilio Lledó Íñigo, since 1994.

== m seat ==
- Rafael Alvarado Ballester, 1982–2001.
- Claudio Guillén, 2003–2007.
- José María Merino, since 2008.

== n seat ==
- Jesús Prados Arrarte, 1982–1983.
- Valentín García Yebra, 1985–2010.
- Carme Riera Guilera, since 2013.

== ñ seat ==
- José López Rubio, 1983–1996.
- Luis María Anson Oliart, since 1998, journalist

== o seat ==
- Ángel Martín Municio, 1984–2002.
- Antonio Fernández Alba, 2006–2024.

== p seat ==
- Francisco Rico Manrique, 1987-2024.
- Cristina Sánchez López, TBA

== q seat ==
- Gregorio Salvador Caja, 1987–2020.
- Asunción Gómez-Pérez, since 2023.

== r seat ==
- Antonio Mingote Barrachina, 1988–2012.
- Santiago Muñoz Machado, since 2013, jurist.

== s seat ==
- José Luis Pinillos Díaz, 1988–2013.
- María Paz Battaner Arias, since 2017.

== t seat ==
- Ignacio Bosque Muñoz, since 1997.

== u seat ==
- Antonio Muñoz Molina, since 1996, novelist
