= Marquess of Villena =

Hereditary title in the Peerage of Spain

Marquessate of Villena
- Creation date: 12 November 1445
- Created by: John II
- Peerage: Peerage of Spain
- First holder: Juan Pacheco y Téllez-Girón, 1st Marquess of Villena
- Present holder: Francisco de Borja de Soto y Moreno-Santamaría, 21st Marquess of Villena

Marquess of Villena (Spanish: Marqués de Villena) is a hereditary title in the Peerage of Spain, granted in 1445 by John II to Juan Pacheco, Grand Master of the Order of Santiago and later also 1st Duke of Escalona.

It was originally founded as the Lordship of Villena in the thirteenth century by Ferdinand III of Castile for his youngest son, Don Manuel. In 1369, the estate was elevated to a Marquisate, the first such designation in Castile, and awarded to Don Alfonso of Aragon.
However, the title was not hereditary and in 1395 it reverted back to the crown of Castile. From that point, Villena had a complicated history of awards and reversions back to the crown until John II granted it as a hereditary title to Juan Pacheco in 1445. It was the first time the Marquisate was held outside of royalty.

The 8th marquess, Juan Manuel Fernández Pacheco, founded the Royal Spanish Academy.

== Marquesses of Villena (1st Creation) ==
1. Alfonso of Aragon (1366-1412)
2. Pedro of Aragon (1384–1385)

== Marquesses of Villena (2nd Creation) ==
1. Juan Pacheco, 1st Marquess of Villena (1445–1474)
2. Diego Lopez de Pacheco, 2nd Marquess of Villena (1468–1529)
3. Diego López Pacheco, 3rd Marquess of Villena (1529–1556)
4. Francisco Pacheco, 4th Marquess of Villena (1556–1574)
5. Juan Fernández Pacheco, 5th Marquess of Villena (1574–1615)
6. Felipe Fernández Pacheco, 6th Marquess of Villena (1615–1633)
7. Diego López Pacheco, 7th Marquess of Villena (1633–1653)
8. Juan Manuel López de Pacheco, 8th Marquess of Villena (1653–1725)
9. Mercurio López Pacheco, 9th Marquess of Villena (1725–1738)
10. Andrés Fernández Pacheco, 10th Marquess of Villena (1738–1746)
11. Juan López Pacheco, 10th Marquess of Villena (1746–1751)
12. Felipe Lopez-Pacheco de La Cueva, 12th Marquess of Villena (1751–1798)
13. Diego López Pacheco y Téllez-Girón, 13th Marquess of Villena (1798–1811)
14. Bernardino Fernández de Velasco, 14th Marquess of Villena (1811–1851)
15. Francisco de Borja de Martorell y Téllez-Girón, 15th Marquess of Villena (1851–1897)
16. Luis Téllez-Girón y Fernández de Córdoba, 16th Marquess of Villena (1897–1909)
17. Mariano Tellez-Giron y Fernandez de Cordoba, 17th Marquess of Villena (1909–1931)
18. Francisco de Borja Martorell y Téllez-Girón, 18th Marquess of Villena (1931–1936), executed in the Spanish Civil War
19. María de La Soledad de Martorell y Castillejo, 19th Marchioness of Villena (1960–1990)
20. Francisco de Borja de Soto y Martorell, 20th Marquess of Villea (1990–1997)
21. Francisco de Borja de Soto y Moreno-Santamaría, 21st Marquess of Villena (1998-)

== See also ==
- Spanish nobility
