= Verdugo =

Verdugo may refer to:

- Verdugo (river), a river in Pontevedra, Galicia, Spain
- Verdugo (surname)
- Verdugo Mountains, a mountain range in California, United States
- Verdugo Wash, a river in California, United States

== See also ==
- El Verdugo (disambiguation)
- Verdugo Hills (disambiguation)
- Verdugos, a region of Los Angeles County, California
