= Senator Fernández =

Senator Fernández may refer to:

== Argentina (Chamber of Senators) ==
- Anabel Fernández Sagasti (born 1984)
- Aníbal Fernández (born 1957)
- Graciela Fernández Meijide (born 1931)
- Nicolás Fernández (politician) (born 1958)

== Bolivia (Chamber of Senators) ==
- Percy Fernández (1939–2025)

== Chile (Senate of the Republic) ==
- Sergio Fernández Fernández (1939–2024)
- Sergio Fernández Larraín (1909–1983)

== Dominican Republic (Senate of the Republic) ==
- Jaime David Fernández Mirabal (born 1956)

== Guam (Legislature of Guam) ==
- Carmen Fernandez (fl. 2000s)

== Mexico (Senate of the Republic) ==
- Diego Fernández de Cevallos (born 1941)
- Francisco Fernández de Cevallos (born 1947)
- Gerardo Fernández Noroña (born 1960)
- Juan Fernández Albarrán (1901–1972)
- Mauricio Fernández Garza (1950–2025)
- Mónica Fernández Balboa (born 1966)

== Paraguay (Chamber of Senators) ==
- José Félix Fernández Estigarribia (born 1941)

== Philippines (Senate of the Philippines) ==
- Ramón J. Fernández (1878–1964)

== Spain (Senate of Spain) ==
- Francisco Fernández de Béthencourt (1850–1916)
- Guillermo Fernández Vara (1958–2025)
- Jesús Fernández Vaquero (1953–2021)
