= Verdugo (surname) =

Verdugo is a surname of Spanish origin. Verdugo translates to "butcher" or "executioner" in English. Notable people with the surname include:

- Agustín Landa Verdugo (1923–2009), Mexican architect and urban planner
- Alex Verdugo, (born 1996), American baseball player
- Alonso Verdugo, 3rd Count of Torrepalma (1706–1767), Spanish count
- Arnoldo Martínez Verdugo (1925–2013), Mexican politician
- Elena Verdugo (1925–2017), American actress
- Francisco Verdugo (1537–1595), Spanish military commander
- Gorka Verdugo (born 1978), Spanish cyclist
- José María Verdugo (1751–1831), soldier of the Presidio of San Diego
- Kevin Verdugo (born 1968), American football player and coach
- Mariano Verdugo (1746–1822), Spanish soldier and mayor
- Patricia Verdugo (1947–2008), Chilean journalist, writer and activist
- Pedro Verdugo, 2nd Count of Torrepalma (1657–1720), Spanish count and academician
- Ryan Verdugo (born 1987), American baseball player
