= Foro Iberoamericano Sobre Estrategias de Comunicación =

FISEC (Foro Iberoamericano Sobre Estrategias de Comunicación) or "Ibero-American Forum on Communication Strategies" is a nonprofit association founded in 2003 by a group of academic and professional experts as a common meeting point in the field of communication and strategy. It includes more than 350 experts from 120 universities and 130 members of the mass media, institutions and firms from Latin American countries, the United States, Italy, France, Germany and Russia. Among the members are French epistemologist and essayist Edgar Morin, Spanish psychologist José Luis Pinillos Diaz, Colombian philosopher Guillermo Hoyos, cultural anthropologist Constantin Von Barloewen (Harvard University Council, U.S.A.), and communicators and media analysts Jesús Martín Barbero (Pontificia Universidad Javierana, Bogotá), Rafael Alberto Pérez (Universidad Complutense de Madrid), Jesús Galindo Cáceres (Tecnológico de Monterrey, Mexico), José Carreño (Universidad Iberoamericana de México DF and ex spokesman for the Mexican Government) and Sandra Massoni (Universidad de Rosario, Argentina).

Through the debates carried out during FISEC's 7th International Conference and through a bibliography the organization is developing a “New Strategic Theory” which is explained in the book Hacia una teoría general de la estrategia (Ariel, 2009) written by two of its members with a prologue written by the Latin American Secretary General Enrique V. Iglesias.

== Geography ==
FISEC is present in 22 countries and has established national chapters in nine of them:

- Argentina
- Brazil
- Colombia
- Costa Rica
- Dominican Republic
- Mexico
- Peru
- Portugal
- Spain

== Board of directors ==
The current leadership team of FISEC was elected in October 2016 in Colombia:

- Rafael Alberto Perez (R.I.P) - Honor President.
- Raul Herrera - International President
- Manuel Quiterio Cedeño - Treasurer
- Haydée Guzmán - International Vice-president
- Dino Villegas - International Vice-president
