= Manuel Villegas =

Manuel Villegas may refer to:

- Manuel Delgado Villegas (1943–1998), Spanish serial killer
- Manuel Villegas (golfer) (born 1984), Colombian golfer
- Manuel Villegas (swimmer) (1908–?), Mexican swimmer
- Manuel Villegas Piñateli (died 1752), member of the Royal Spanish Academy
