= José Antonio Conde =

Spanish historian

The Most Excellent José Antonio Conde
- Born: José Antonio Conde y García; 28 October 1766; La Peraleja (Cuenca), Spain
- Died: 12 June 1820 (aged 53); Madrid, Spain

Seat G of the Real Academia Española
- In office 16 March 1802 – 8 November 1814
- Preceded by: Tomás Antonio Sánchez
- Succeeded by: Juan Pérez Villamil

Seat N of the Real Academia Española
- In office 30 September 1818 – 12 June 1820
- Preceded by: Pío Ignacio Lamo
- Succeeded by: Ramón Cabrera y Rubio

José Antonio Conde y García (28 October 1766–12 June 1820) was a Spanish Orientalist and historian of Al-Andalus period. His Anacreon (1791) obtained him a post in the royal library in 1795. He also published several paraphrases of Greek classics. These were followed in 1799 by an edition of the Arabic text of Muhammad al-Idrisi's Description of Spain, with notes and a translation. As an afrancesado, he fled Spain in 1813, but returned a year later and was eventually reinstated to his honors. His magnum opus, the three-volume Historia de la Dominación de los Árabes en España, was published after his death.

== Career ==
Conde was educated at the University of Alcalá. He published a translation of the works of the Greek poet Anacreon in 1795. In 1796–1797, he published paraphrases from Theocritus, Bion, Moschus, Sappho and Meleager. In 1799, these were followed by an edition of the Arabic text of Muhammad al-Idrisi's Description of Spain, with notes and a translation, making him among the first modern western historians to translate an important Arabic text. Conde became a member of the Spanish Academy in 1802. He succeeded Tomás Antonio Sánchez de Uribe to the so-called G seat. Conde was a member also of Academy of Sciences and Letters of Berlin.

In 1804, Conde was accepted to membership of the Royal Academy of History, but his appointment as interpreter to Joseph Bonaparte and his being an afrancesado (French sympathizer) led to his expulsion from both the Academy of History and the Spanish Academy in 1814. He escaped to France in 1813, but returned a year later. He was not permitted to reside at Madrid until 1816. Two years later he was re-elected to his former seats by both academies.

Conde died in poverty on the 12 June 1820. George Ticknor, American Hispanist at Harvard University and several Spanish friends Leandro Fernández de Moratín, Francisco Martínez de la Rosa and Agustín Argüelles paid his funeral expenses.

== Personal information ==
Conde born at La Peraleja, Cuenca, in present-day Spain on 28 October 1766. He married a 20-year-old cousin of Leandro Fernández de Moratin, who died in childbirth in September 1817.

== Legacy ==
His major work, Historia de la Dominación de los Árabes en España, was published in 1820–1821. He completed only the first volume before his death. Juan Tineo compiled volumes two and three from Conde's manuscript. This work was translated into German (1824–1825), French (1825) and English (1854). Although it has since been superseded by other works, Conde's work stimulated others in the same field and in the context of time it was considered a valuable work.

Another of Conde's works was his translation and annotation of Thekr al Andalus taleef Sherif Aledris / Descripción de España de Xerif Aledris, conocido por El Nubiense, first published in Madrid by the Imprenta Real in 1799.
