= Portrait of Jerónimo de Cevallos =

Painting by El Greco

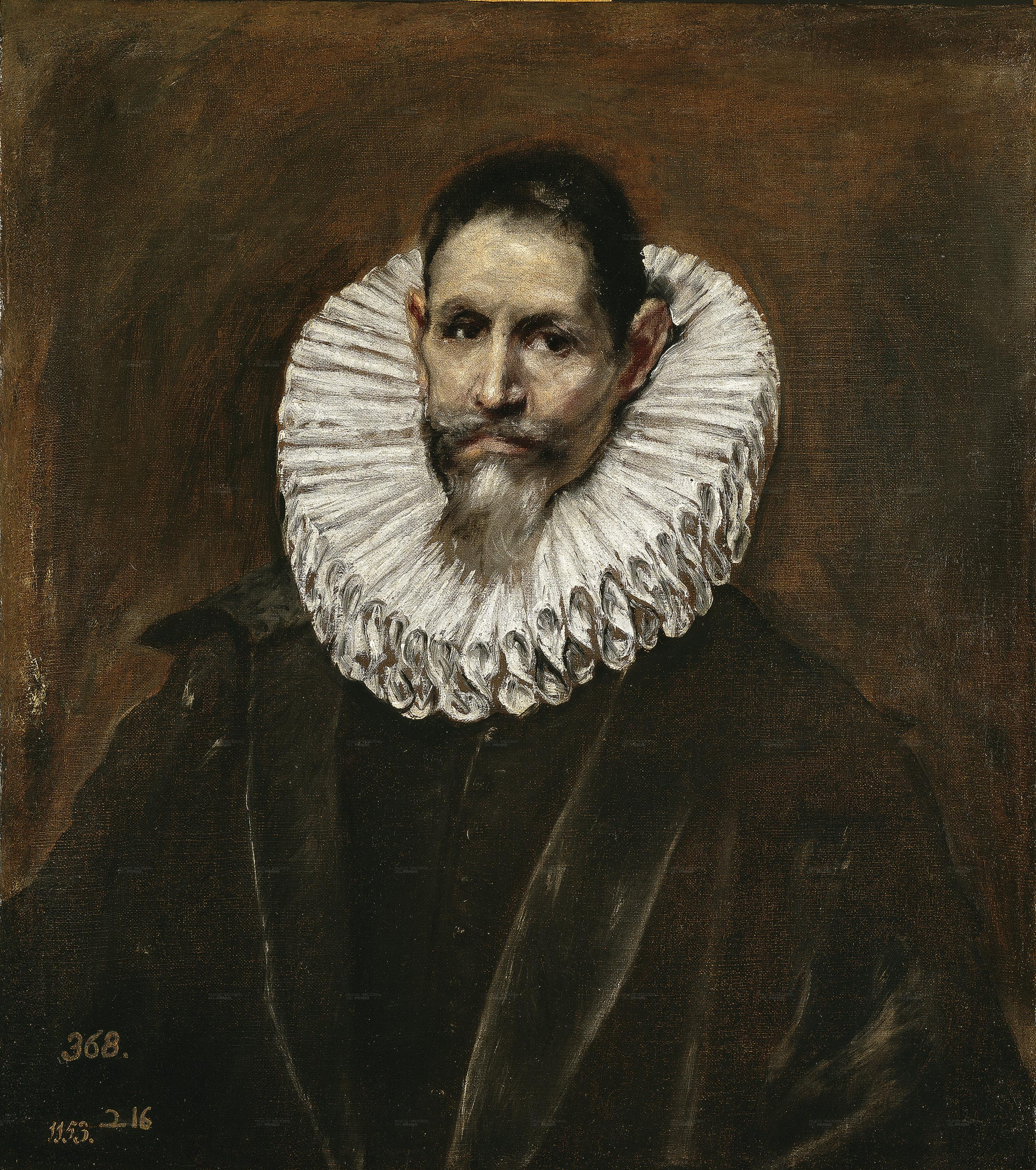
- Artist: El Greco
- Year: 1609-1613
- Medium: oil on canvas
- Dimensions: 65 cm × 55 cm (26 in × 22 in)
- Location: Museo del Prado, Madrid

Portrait of Jerónimo de Cevallos is a 1609-1613 work by El Greco, from late in his Toledo period. It originally hung in the Quinta del Duque del Arco in the Royal Palace of El Pardo in Madrid but now in the Museo del Prado.

It shows Jerónimo de Cevallos, a distinguished jurist of natural law at Escalona but also frequently in Toledo on business as a secretary and councillor for that city. Several sources note that he was the patron and protector of the painter's son Jorge Manuel. The neutral background is influenced by Titian and the Venetian School.

== See also ==
- List of works by El Greco

== Bibliography ==
- ÁLVAREZ LOPERA, José, El Greco, Madrid, Arlanza, 2005, Biblioteca «Descubrir el Arte», (colección «Grandes maestros»).
- SCHOLZ-HÄNSEL, Michael, El Greco, Colonia, Taschen, 2003.
