= Soledad Puértolas =

Spanish writer

The Most Excellent Soledad Puértolas
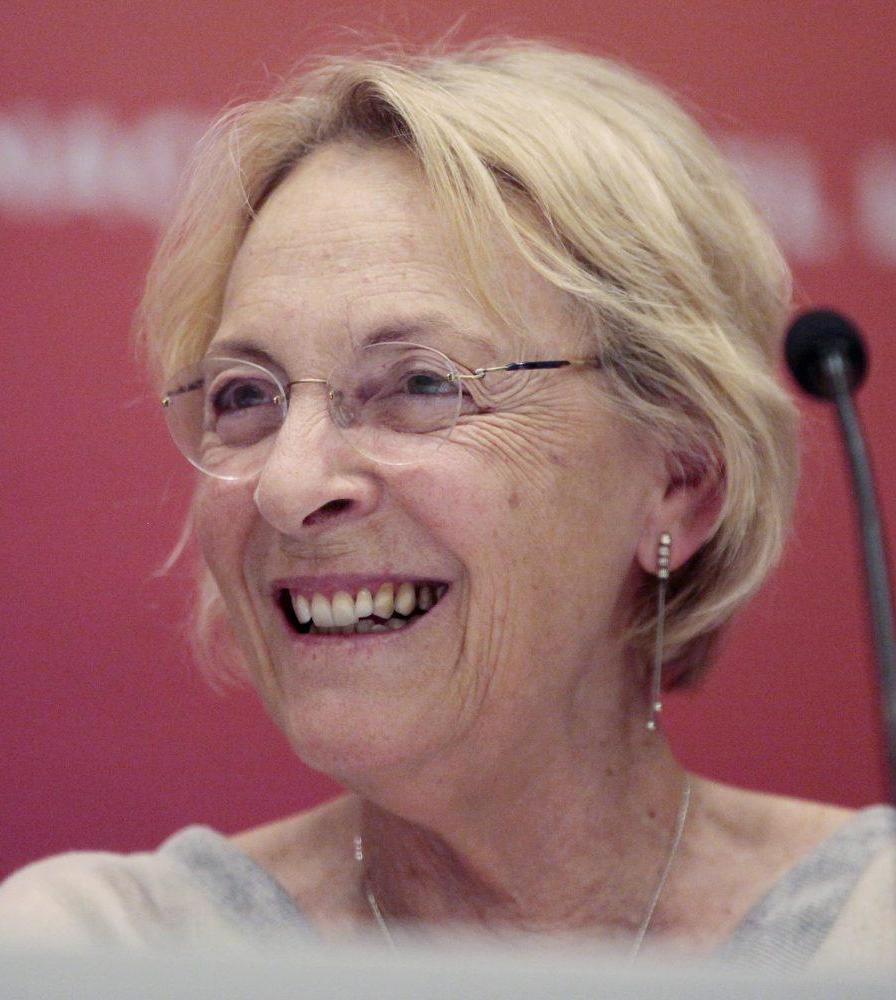
- Puértolas in the Guadalajara International Book Fair in 2017
- Born: Soledad Puértolas Villanueva; 3 February 1947 (age 79); Zaragoza, Spain

Seat g of the Real Academia Española
- Incumbent
- Assumed office 21 November 2010 (Note: Elected on 28 January 2010)
- Preceded by: Antonio Colino

Soledad Puértolas Villanueva (born 3 February 1947) is a Spanish writer. On 28 January 2010, she was named an inmortal or member of the Real Academia Española. She is a recipient of the Premio Planeta de Novela.

== Biography ==
Puértolas was born on 3 February 1947 in Zaragoza. She started studying Political Sciences in Madrid, but political problems prevented her from pursuing this further. She then went to study Economic Sciences in Bilbao but again did not finish her course. She eventually took up studying journalism. She married at twenty-one and went to live with her husband in Trondheim, Norway. After returning to Spain, the couple moved to California, where she obtained an M.A. in Spanish and Portuguese Language and Literature at the University of California, Santa Barbara and where she gave birth to a son, Diego Pita, now a writer. After three years in California she moved back to Spain to 1974. In 1979 she won the Premio Sésamo for her work El bandido doblemente armado, the Premio Planeta in 1989 for Queda la noche, and the Premio Anagrama de Ensayo in 1993 with La vida oculta.

Puértolas was elected to Seat g of the Real Academia Española on 28 January 2010, she took up her seat on 21 November the same year. She filled the seat formerly occupied by Antonio Colino.

Her short story Viejas historias (Tales from the Past) was included in Rainy Days - Días de lluvia: Short Stories by Contemporary Spanish Women Writers, an anthology edited by Montserrat Lunati, together with a translation into English.

== Publications ==
=== Novels ===
- El bandido doblemente armado. Madrid: Legasa, 1980. Novel. Premio Sésamo 1979
- Burdeos. Barcelona: Anagrama, 1986. Novel.
- Todos mienten. Barcelona: Anagrama, 1988. Novel.
- Queda la noche. Barcelona: Planeta, 1989. Novel. Premio Planeta 1989.
- Días del Arenal. Barcelona: Planeta, 1992. Novel.
- Si al atardecer llegara el mensajero. Barcelona: Anagrama, 1995. Novel.
- Una vida inesperada. Barcelona: Anagrama, 1997. Novel.
- La señora Berg. Barcelona: Anagrama, 1999. Novel.
- La rosa de plata. Madrid: Espasa-Calpe, 1999. Novel.
- Historia de un abrigo. Barcelona: Anagrama, 2005. Novel.
- Cielo nocturno. Barcelona: Anagrama, 2008. Novel.
- Mi amor en vano. Barcelona: Anagrama, 2012.
- Novel. Música de ópera. Barcelona: Anagrama, 2019. Novel.

=== Short stories ===
- El recorrido de los animales. Madrid: Júcar, 1975. Short story.
- Una enfermedad moral. Madrid: Trieste, 1982. Short stories.
- A través de las ondas. Short story in Doce relatos de mujeres. Navajo, Ymelda (ed.) Madrid: Alianza, 1982, pp. 165–177.
- La sombra de una noche. Madrid: Anaya, 1986. Short story.
- La corriente del golfo. Barcelona: Anagrama, 1993. Short stories.
- La hija predilecta. Short story in Madres e hijas. Freixas, Laura (ed.) Barcelona: Anagrama, 1996
- Gente que vino a mi boda. Barcelona: Anagrama, 1998. Short stories.
- A la hora en que cierran los bares. Madrid: Difusión Directa Édera, 1998. Short stories.
- El cuarto secreto. Short story in Relatos para un fin de milenio. Barcelona: Plaza y Janés, 1998, pp. 15–26
- El inventor del tetrabrik. Short story in Vidas de mujer. Monmany, Mercedes (ed.) Madrid: Alianza, 1998, pp. 131–143.
- Un poeta en la piscina. Short story in Cuentos solidarios. Madrid: ONCE, 1999, pp. 13–15.
- La carta desde el refugio. Short story in Mujeres al alba. Madrid: Alfaguara, 1999, pp. 133–136.
- Adiós a las novias. Barcelona: Anagrama, 2000. Short stories.
- Pisando jardines. Short story in Orosia: Mujeres de sol a sol. Jaca: Pirineum Multimedia, 2002, pp. 159–164.
- Ausencia. Short story in Mujeres en ruta. 2005, pp. 41–47.
- Masajes. Short story in Cuentos de amigas. Laura Freixas (ed.) Anagrama, 2009.
- Cantalobos. Short story in Pertubaciones, ed. Juan Jacinto Muñoz Rengel. Salto de Página Editores, 2009.
- Compañeras de viaje. Barcelona. Anagrama, 2010. Short stories.
- El fin. Barcelona. Anagrama, 2015. Short stories.
- Chicos y chicas. Barcelona: Anagrama, 2016. Short stories.

=== Essays, articles and biography ===
- El Madrid de "La lucha por la vida". Madrid: Helios, 1971. Essay.
- La vida oculta. Barcelona: Anagrama, 1993. Essay. Premio Anagrama 1993.
- La vida se mueve. Madrid: El País-Aguilar, 1995. Articles.
- Recuerdos de otra persona. Barcelona: Anagrama, 1996. Biography.
- Rosa Chacel. Essay in Retratos literarios: Escritores españoles del siglo XX evocados por sus contemporáneos. Freixas. Laura (ed.) Madrid: Espasa Calpe, 1997, pp. 181–182.
- Con mi madre. Barcelona: Anagrama, 2001.
- Lúcida melancolía. Pamplona. Ipso ediciones. 2017. Colección Baroja & Yo. Essay.

=== Translations into English ===
- Take Six: Six Spanish Women Writers, edited and translated by Kathryn Phillips-Miles and Simon Deefholts: Dedalus Books, 2022. (Contains a selection of Soledad's stories in English translation).
