= Lope Díez de Armendáriz, 1st Marquess of Cadreita =

Mexican politician

The Most Excellent The Marquess of Cadreita KOS
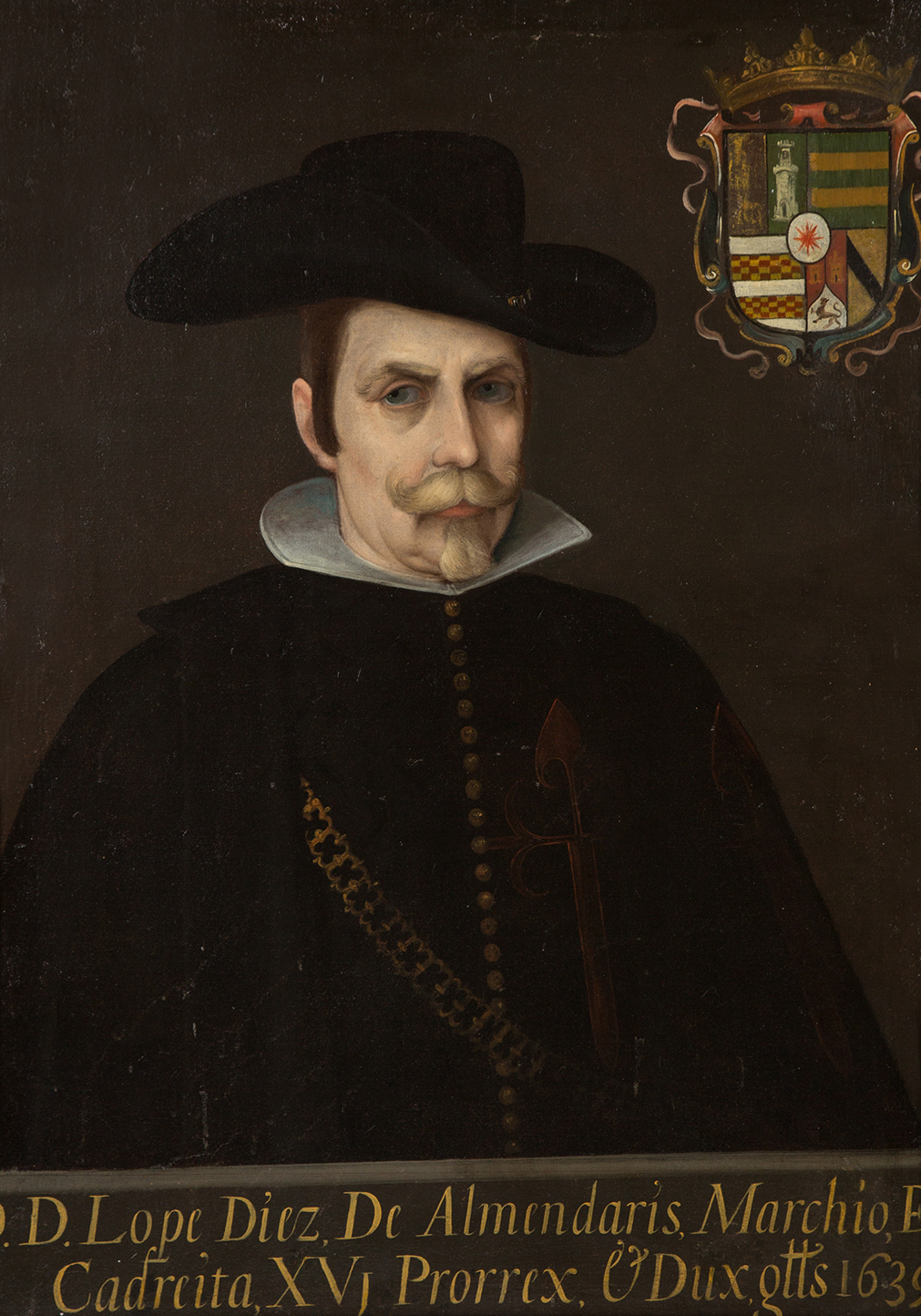

Viceroy of New Spain
- In office 16 September 1635 – 27 August 1640
- Monarch: Philip IV
- Valido: Count-Duke of Olivares
- Preceded by: Rodrigo Pacheco
- Succeeded by: Diego López Pacheco

Personal details
- Born: c. 1575 Charcas (Bolivia)
- Died: c. 1640 or after Madrid, Spain

Don Lope Díez de Aux de Armendáriz, 1st Marquess of Cadreita (sometimes Lope Díaz de Armendáriz) (1575 in Charcas, Viceroyalty of Peru – 1640 or after) was a Spanish nobleman and the first Criollo to be viceroy of New Spain. He served as viceroy from 16 September 1635 to 27 August 1640.

== Early life ==
He was the son of Lope Díez de Aux y Armendáriz and Juana de Saavedra, Lords of Cadreita. His father had been President and Captain General of the Real Audiencias of Quito, Charcas, and the New Kingdom of Granada. Therefore, it is very likely that he was born in present-day Bolivia during the governorship of Charcas (1573-1576).

In 1584, the family returned to Spain where his father had his son educated for a naval career.
The son had a distinguished career in command of the convoys escorting merchant ships and treasure ships from the Indies to Spain. His fame and prestige increased when, in 1625, he managed to outwit enemy corsairs, saving the valuable treasure entrusted to his care. In April 1633, he was given command of a fleet which successfully expelled the Dutch from Saint Martin.

He served also as ambassador to the court in Vienna (1629-1631) and in Rome on a special mission for Pope Urban VIII.

== Viceroy of New Spain ==
On 19 April 1635 King Philip IV named him viceroy of New Spain. He made his formal entry into Mexico City on 16 September 1635 and took up his duties. His first concern was to continue the construction of drainage works to safeguard the city from the perennial floods, and to repair damage from recent flooding.

On 17 January 1637 an earthquake destroyed some of the construction, in particular the drainage tunnel La Quemada. The viceroy called in two experts, Fernando de Zepeda and Hernán Carillo, for advice. In March of the following year, they advised the opening of a canal to replace the tunnel. The viceroy, in consultation with the city government, the Audiencia, and the guilds, approved the construction of a canal to take advantage of the huge fissure of Nochistongo. This canal proved very helpful in flood control, and was afterwards expanded by the government of independent Mexico.

On 22 April 1639 a bull of Pope Urban VIII prohibited slavery in Latin America. Philip IV banned slavery of the Indians in New Spain, but permitted the continuation of black slavery. Escaped black slaves (cimarrones) took refuge in the mountains, particularly in the current state of Veracruz.

To protect the inhabitants of the New Kingdom of León (Nuevo León) from raids by Apaches, Comanches and Lipanes, Díez de Armendáriz ordered the construction of a presidio at Cadereyta, and also another fort of the same name in Querétaro. He sent another expedition to the Californias, with disastrous results.

He ordered the cleaning of the drainage ditches and canals of the city. He founded the Hospital Espíritu Santo and the convent of San Bernardo. He also formed the Armada de Barlovento, based in Veracruz, which patrolled the Gulf coast to protect the ports and shipping from pirates.

He turned over the government of New Spain to his successor, Diego López Pacheco, 7th Duke of Escalona, on 28 August 1640. He was accused of many irregularities and character flaws by his enemies, chief among them the bishop of Puebla, Juan de Palafox y Mendoza.

== Marriage and children ==
He married Antonia de Sandoval Afán de Rivera Enríquez, third Countess of La Torre and second daughter of Pedro Suárez de Castilla y Rivera.

From this marriage, his only daughter and heir, Juana Francisca Díez de Aux y Armendáriz, was born in Seville. She would later become the wife of Francisco Fernández de la Cueva, 8th Duke of Alburquerque, who would eventually also become Viceroy of New Spain.

== Sources ==
- Mathews, Thomas (1969). "The Spanish Domination of Saint Martin (1633-1648)". Caribbean Studies. 9 (1): 3–23. JSTOR 25612105.
- (in Spanish) García Puron, Manuel, México y sus gobernantes, v. 1. Mexico City: Joaquín Porrua, 1984.
- (in Spanish) Orozco Linares, Fernando, Gobernantes de México. Mexico City: Panorama Editorial, 1985, ISBN 968-38-0260-5.
