= Luis de Guzmán Ponce de Leon =

Spanish noble, military figure and diplomat

General Luis de Guzmán Count-consort of Villaverde
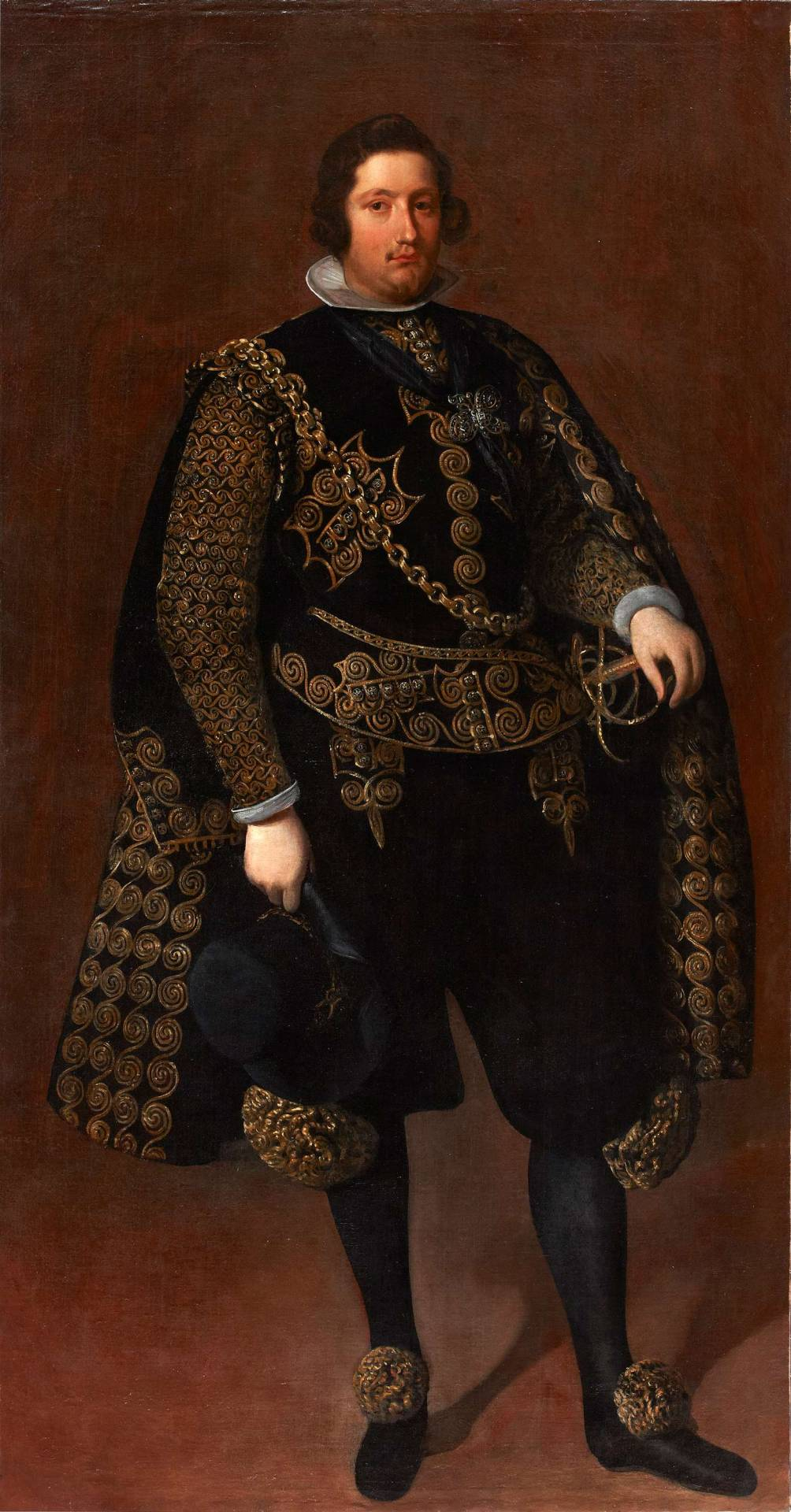
- Luis de Guzmán Ponce de León, c. 1632–1635 by the School of Diego Velázquez.
- Born: Luis de Guzmán Ponce de León; 11 June 1605; Marchena, Crown of Castile, Spanish Empire
- Died: 29 March 1668 (aged 62); Milan, Duchy of Milan, Spanish Empire
- Spouse: Mencía Pimentel de Guzmán
- Children: María de Atocha Guzmán Ponce de León
- Relatives: Luis Ponce de León y de Zúñiga (father); Victoria Álvarez de Toledo y Colonna (mother); Pedro de Toledo Osorio, 5th Marquess of Villafranca (grandfather)
- Military career
- Allegiance: Spanish Empire
- Branch: (Spain) Spanish Army
- Service years: 1627–1668
- Rank: General
- Conflicts: Thirty Years' War: War of the Mantuan Succession; Second siege of Casale Monferrato; Eighty Years' War: Capture of Maastricht; Franco-Spanish War: Siege of Arras (1640)

Viceroy of Navarre
- In office 6 May 1646 – 19 June 1649
- Monarch: Philp IV
- Preceded by: Andrea Cantelmo
- Succeeded by: Diego López Pacheco

Ambassador of Spain to the Holy See
- In office February 1657 – 1661
- Monarch: Philp IV
- Valido: Luis de Haro
- Preceded by: Diego de Aragón Tagliavia
- Succeeded by: Pascual de Aragón

Governor of the Duchy of Milan
- In office 19 March 1662 – 29 March 1668
- Monarchs: Philp IV; Charles II
- Regent: Mariana of Austria
- Valido: Luis de Haro; Juan Everardo Nithard
- Preceded by: Francesco Gaetano
- Succeeded by: Paolo Spinola

Luis de Guzmán Ponce de Leon, (Marchena, 11 June 1605 – Milan, 29 March 1668), Count-consort of Villaverde, was a Spanish noble, military and diplomat. From 1662 until his death, he was Governor of the Duchy of Milan.

== Biography ==
Luis de Guzmán Ponce de Leon was the second son of Luis Ponce de León y de Zúñiga (1573–1605), VI Marquis of Zahara, and his wife Victoria Álvarez de Toledo y Colonna, daughter of Viceroy Pedro de Toledo Osorio, 5th Marquess of Villafranca. His elder brother was Rodrigo Ponce de León, 4th Duke of Arcos.

On 20 September 1629 he obtained the royal patent to be able to form his own infantry regiment recruited in Andalusia and Murcia. He took part in the second siege of Casale Monferrato in 1630 during the War of the Mantuan Succession. The following year he went to Flanders serving under the orders of the Marquis of Santa Cruz. There, he fought in the relief of Bruges, in the Palatinate, and in the failed attempts to prevent the Capture of Maastricht by the Dutch in 1632. He returned to Spain on 23 November 1632.

In 1635 he was again in Italy in the retinue of the Marquis of Leganés who in May 1637 designated him as the successor of Juan de Garay Otáñez y Rada to send his troops to Lombardy in support of the war operations of those years. However, the ancient privileges evoked by Juan de Garay Otáñez y Rada soon forced the governor to dismiss Guzmán Ponce de Leon, who was sent to Alsace as a cavalry general under the command of the Duke of Lorraine, where he was involved in the campaign of Luxembourg and the Siege of Arras (1640).

In 1642 he returned for good to Spain where he was appointed to the position of General commissioner of the Spanish cavalry and served in Catalonia until May 1646 when he was appointed Viceroy of Navarre upon the death of Andrea Cantelmo. In 1648, King Philip IV of Spain appointed him Captain of the company of his "Spanish Guard", a position that obviously also earned him the title of Gentleman of the sovereign's chamber as well as becoming a member of the Council of state for war.

In February 1657, he was appointed to the post of Spanish Ambassador to the Holy See in February 1657, but it took him more than two years to leave Madrid, and he did not make his public entry into Rome until early December 1659. In 1662, he was finally assigned to occupy the position of Governor of the Duchy of Milan, moving back to Italy on 5 June of that year. He died in Milan on 29 March 1668.

Government offices
Preceded by Andrea Cantelmo	Viceroy of Navarre; 1646–1649	Succeeded by Duke of Escalona
Preceded by Duke of Sermoneta	Governor of the Duchy of Milan; 1662–1668	Succeeded by Marquis of Los Balbases
