= Juan Manuel Fernández Pacheco, 8th Duke of Escalona =

Spanish noble (1650-1725)

The Most Excellent The Duke of Escalona GE
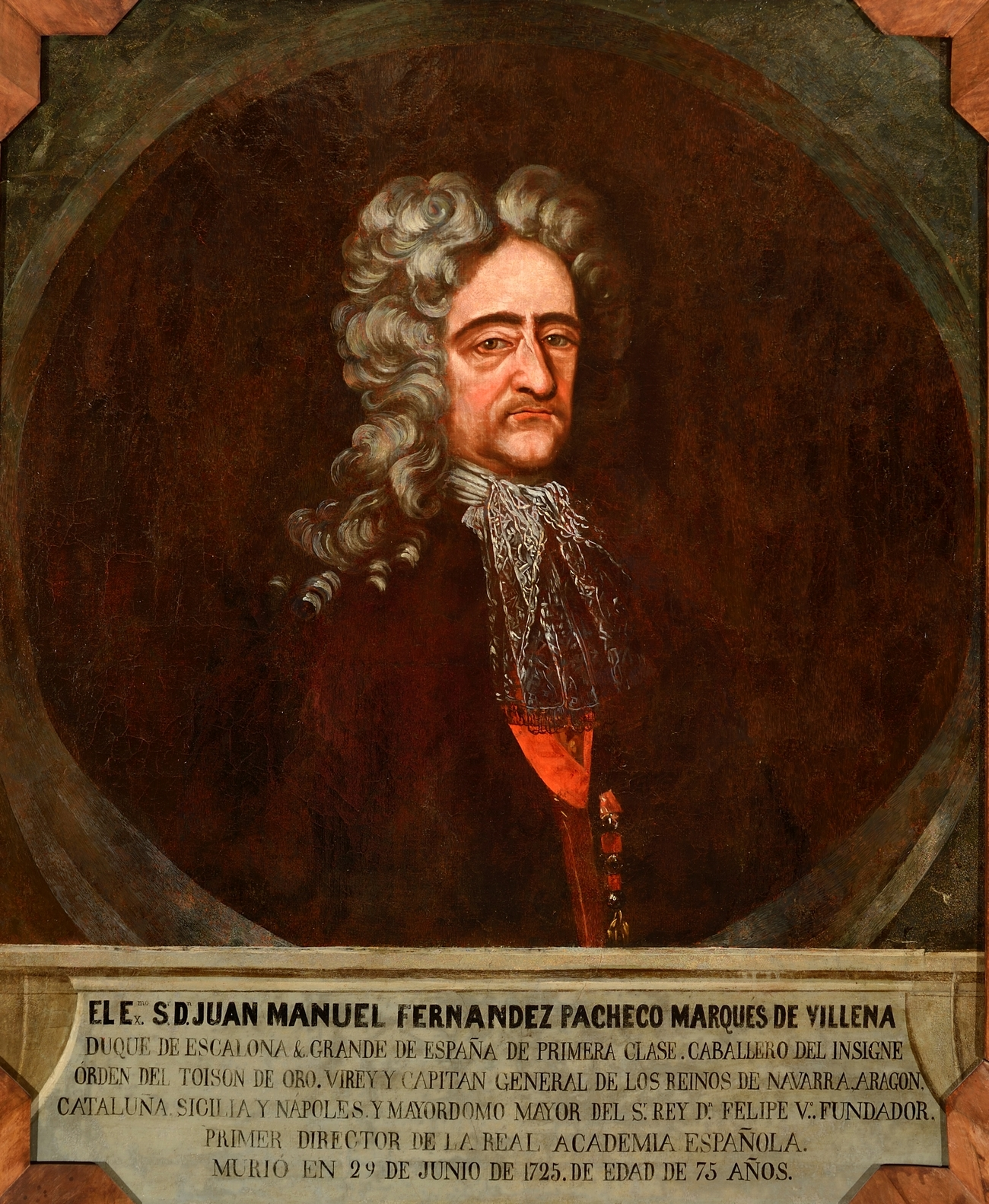
- The Duke of Escalona in an 18th century painting

Seat A of the Royal Spanish Academy
- In office 6 July 1713 – 29 June 1725
- Preceded by: Seat established
- Succeeded by: Tomás Pascual de Azpeitia

Director of the Royal Spanish Academy
- In office 6 July 1713 – 29 June 1725
- Preceded by: Position established
- Succeeded by: Mercurio López Pacheco

Personal details
- Born: Juan Manuel María de la Aurora Fernández Pacheco Acuña Girón y Portocarrero; 7 September 1650 Marcilla (Navarre), Spain
- Died: 29 June 1725 (aged 74) Madrid, Spain
- Spouse: María Josefa de Benavides Silva y Manrique de Lara (m. 1674)
- Children: Mercurio López Pacheco, 9th Duke of Escalona; Marciano Fernandez Pacheco, 12th Marquess of Moya
- Parents: Diego López Pacheco, 7th Duke of Escalona; Juana de Zúñiga y Sotomayor

Juan Manuel Fernández Pacheco y Zúñiga, Duke of Escalona and Marquess of Villena (Marcilla, Navarre, 7 September 1650 – Madrid, 29 June 1725), was a Spanish aristocrat, politician, and academic who founded the Royal Spanish Academy.

== Biography ==
Duke Juan Manuel Fernández, Duke of Escalona, Marquess of Villena, 12th Count of San Esteban de Gormaz, 8th Count of Xiquena was the son of Diego López Pacheco, 7th Duke of Escalona (1599–1653) and his second wife Juana María Francisca de Zuñiga (died 1652). He served as Mayordomo mayor to the king, viceroy, and captain-general of the Kingdoms of Navarre, Aragon, Catalonia, Sicily and Naples, and, on 9 October 1687, was awarded the title of Knight of the Order of the Golden Fleece. In 1694 he lost the Battle of Torroella against the invading French and, during the War of the Spanish Succession, was imprisoned in Gaeta, Naples, by the Austrian empire, after losing the Siege of Gaeta (1707). Upon his release and return to Spain, he founded—under orders of King Philip V—the Royal Spanish Academy (Real Academia Española (RAE)). He was elected its first lifetime director in 1713.

== Marriage and children ==
on 29 September 1674 he married María Josefa de Benavides Silva y Manrique de Lara, daughter of Diego de Benavides, 8th Count of Santisteban. They had 2 sons:

- Mercurio López Pacheco y Benavides, (Escalona 9 May 1679 - Madrid 7 June 1738), the 9th Duke of Escalona and many other titles and also the lifetime 2nd director of the RAE (1725–1738).
- Marciano Fernández Pacheco (1688-1743)

Government offices
Preceded by Alejandro de Bournonville	Viceroy of Navarre; 1691–1692	Succeeded by Baltasar de Zúñiga
Preceded by Baltasar de los Cobos	Viceroy of Aragon; 1693	Succeeded by Domenico del Giudice
Preceded by Juan Claros Pérez de Guzmán	Viceroy of Catalonia; 1693–1694	Succeeded by Francisco Antonio de Agurto
Preceded by Luis Francisco de la Cerda	Viceroy of Naples; 1700–1713	Succeeded by Georg Adam von Martinitz
Preceded by Pietro Colonna	Viceroy of Sicily; 1701–1702	Succeeded by Francesco del Giudice
Academic offices
New title	Director of The Royal Spanish Academy; 1713–1725	Succeeded by The Duke of Escalona
New title	A seat of The Royal Spanish Academy; 1713–1725	Succeeded by Tomás Pascual de Azpeitia
Spanish nobility
Preceded by Diego López Pacheco	Duke of Escalona; 1653–1725	Succeeded by Mercurio López Pacheco
Preceded by Diego López Pacheco	Marquis of Villena; 1653–1725	Succeeded by Mercurio López Pacheco
Preceded by Diego López Pacheco	Count of San Esteban de Gormaz; 1653–1725	Succeeded by Mercurio López Pacheco
Preceded by Diego López Pacheco	Count of Xiquena; 1653–1725	Succeeded by Mercurio López Pacheco
Preceded by Diego López Pacheco	Marquis of Moya; 1653–1725	Succeeded by Vicente de Cabrera
