= Esteban de Aguilar y Zúñiga =

Esteban de Aguilar y Zúñiga (13 August 1606 – 1681) was a Spanish theologian and writer. He was born in Escalona del Alberche on 13 August 1606 and died in Madrid some time after 1681. He was the son of writer and humanist Juan de Aguilar Villaquirán.

== Education and career ==
Originally a hidalgo nobleman from both parents, he chose the religious career, was ordained a priest, obtained a doctorate in theology and took up residence in the Villa de Madrid. In October 1656 he participated with a tenth, a sonnet, a lyre, a gloss and some limericks in the Angelic Contest organized for the celebration of the Dedication of the New Temple of Saint Thomas", because the Old Temple of the Convent of St. Thomas Aquinas, formerly known as "El Colegio de Atocha" - burned, by an oversight of the neighbors on 14 August 1652.

In the twilight of his life, from 1678 to 1679, he was dean of the renowned College of the town of Escalona. At the same time he held the position of censor of books and his name appears on several "Censorships" and "Endorsements", the first dated in 1663 and the last in 1681; from this last fact it is deduced that he reached seventy-five years old and perhaps surpassed it.

== Works ==
While very young, at twenty-two, he wrote Corona de predicadores (Crown of preachers), a sermon on Saint Stephen which was later printed (Madrid: Maria de Quinones, 1636). At thirty six years old he produced Combates de Job con el demonio (Job's Battles with the devil) (Madrid: Carlos Sanchez, 1642).

Other works include la Quaresma (Lent) or Sermones para ella (Sermons for her) (1657), some single poems for the angelic contest (1657) and la Estatua y árbol con voz, política, canónica y soñada (the Statue and the tree with a political, canonical and dreamy voice (1661).

He translated from Latin into Castilian los Tártaros en China (Tartars in China) by father Martí Martinio (1665) and la Corte Divina (the Divine Court) or Palacio Celestial (the Celestial Palace) by Nicolás Causino (1675) and from Portuguese into Castilian, Laurea lusitana (Lusitanian Laurea), first part (s.a.) and Part II (1679).

== Sources ==
- Theodora Grigoriadu, Doctoral dissertation La obra de Luciano samosatense, orador y filósofo excelente (The work of Luciano, the Samosan, orator and excellent philosopher), Manuscript 55 of the Menéndez y Pelayo library: 2010 edition and study.
