= Jerónimo de Cevallos =

Spanish jurist

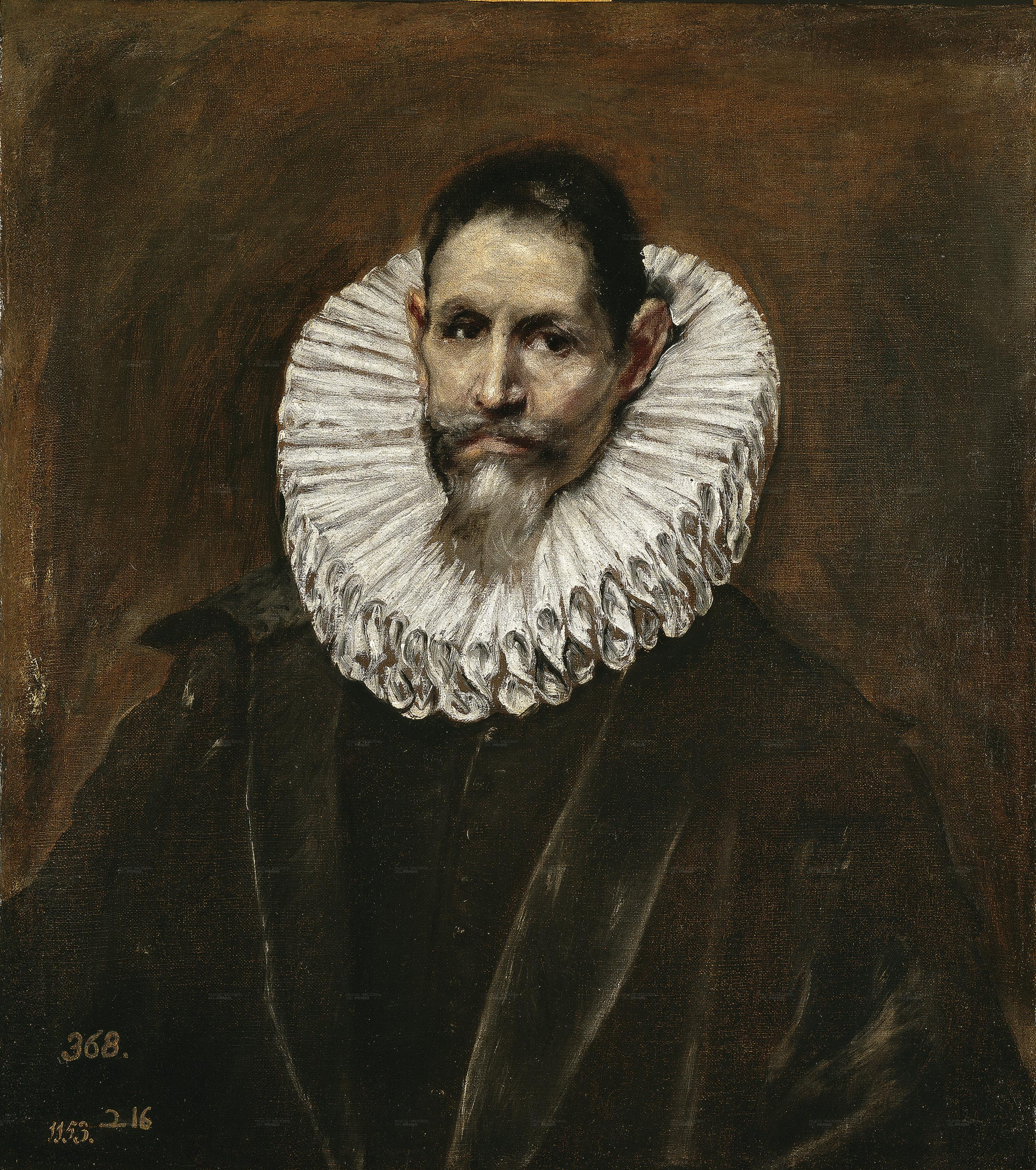
Jerónimo de Cevallos (1613) by El Greco. Museo del Prado, Madrid.

Jerónimo de Cevallos (1560 - 22 July 1641) was a Spanish jurist. He was the subject of El Greco's Portrait of Jerónimo de Cevallos in 1613.

== Life ==
Born in Escalona, Toledo, he studied at the University of Valladolid and the University of Salamanca. He served as a lawyer in both Toledo and his hometown. He married in Toledo, where he also later died.

He published five books, including Speculum practicarum et variarum quaestionum opinionum communium contra communes (1599). According to several sources he was a friend and protector of Jorge Manuel, El Greco's son.

== Bibliography ==
- de Dios, Salustiano (2014). El poder del monarca en la obra de los juristas castellanos (1480-1680) (in Spanish). Cuenca: Universidad de Castilla-La Mancha. ISBN 978-849044-152-7.
- Gómez-Menor, José (1974). "Nuevos datos biográficos sobre el licenciado Jerónimo de Cevallos". Anales toledanos (Diputación Provincial de Toledo) (in Spanish) (10): 187–193. ISSN 0538-1983. Archived from the original on 24 September 2015.
