= Juan Fernandez Pacheco, 5th Duke of Escalona =

Spanish nobleman

Don Juan Fernández Pacheco (20 December 1563 in Escalona, Spain – 5 May 1615 in Escalona, Spain), 5th Duke of Escalona, 5th Marquis of Villena and 5th Count of Xiquena was a Spanish nobleman and, between 1607 and 1610, viceroy of Sicily.

== Biography ==
He was the son of Don Francisco Pacheco, 4th Duke of Escalona (1532–1574) and Juana Alvarez de Toledo.

In 1589, he was made a knight in the Order of the Golden Fleece. He was Spanish ambassador in Rome between 1603 and 1606, then made viceroy of Sicily between 1607 and 1610.

=== Marriage and children ===
He married in 1594 with Serafina de Bragança (1566-1604), daughter of John I, 6th Duke of Braganza. They had 10 children, seven of whom reached adulthood:

1. Diego Antonio (1594–1616), died in captivity in Istanbul.
2. Felipe Juan Baltasar (1596–1633), 6th Duke of Escalona.
3. Diego Roque (1599–1653), 7th Duke of Escalona.
4. Cecilia (1603–1622)
5. Juan Francisco (1606–1663), Bishop of Cuenca, Bishop of Cordoba.
6. María, abbess.
