= Duke of Escalona =

Hereditary title in the Peerage of Spain

Dukedom of Escalona
- Creation date: 12 December 1472
- Created by: Henry IV
- Peerage: Peerage of Spain
- First holder: Juan Pacheco y Téllez-Girón, 1st Duke of Escalona
- Present holder: Francisco de Borja de Soto y Moreno-Santamaría, 21st Duke of Escalona

Duke of Escalona (Spanish: Duque de Escalona) is a hereditary title in the peerage of Spain, accompanied by the dignity of Grandee and granted in 1472 by Henry IV to Juan Pacheco, 1st Marquess of Villena.

The title refers to the village Escalona del Alberche, in the Province of Toledo.

The Dukes of Escalona remained an important family throughout the history of Spain. Charles III of Spain made Juan Pacheco, 11th Duke-consort of Escalona a Grandee of Spain first class in 1750. They had many other titles, including: Marquess of Villena, Count of Xiquena, Count of San Esteban de Gormaz, Count of Castañeda, etc.

== Dukes of Escalona ==
- Juan Pacheco, 1st Duke of Escalona (1419–1474)
- Diego Lopez de Pacheco, 2nd Duke of Escalona (1456–1529)
- Diego López Pacheco, 3rd Duke of Escalona (1506–1556)
- Francisco Pacheco, 4th Duke of Escalona (1532–1574)
- Juan Fernandez Pacheco, 5th Duke of Escalona (1563–1615)
- Felipe Fernández Pacheco, 6th Duke of Escalona (1596–1633)
- Diego López Pacheco, 7th Duke of Escalona (1599–1653)
- Juan Manuel López de Pacheco, 8th Duke of Escalona (1650–1725)
- Mercurio López Pacheco, 9th Duke of Escalona (1679–1738)
- Andrés Fernández Pacheco, 10th Duke of Escalona (1710–1746)
- Juan López Pacheco, 11th Duke of Escalona (1746–1751)
- Felipe Lopez-Pacheco de La Cueva, 12th Duke of Escalona (1727–1798)
- Diego López Pacheco Téllez-Girón Gómez de Sandoval, 13th Duke of Escalona (1754–1811)
- Bernardino Fernández de Velasco, 14th Duke of Escalona (1783–1851)
- Francisco de Borja de Martorell y Téllez-Girón, 15th Duke of Escalona (1839–1897)
- Mariano Tellez-Giron y Fernandez de Cordoba, 16th Duke of Escalona (1887–1931)
- Gabino de Martorell y Téllez-Girón, 17th Duke of Escalona (1894–1918)
- María de La Soledad de Martorell y Castillejo, 18th Duchess of Escalona (1924–)
- Ángela María Téllez-Girón y Duque de Estrada, 19th Duchess of Escalona (1961–1966)
- Francisco de Borja de Soto y Martorell, 19th Duke of Escalona (1966–1997)
- Francisco de Borja de Soto y Moreno-Santamaría, 20th Duke of Escalona

== See also ==
- List of dukes in the peerage of Spain
- List of current grandees of Spain
