= Paz Battaner =

Spanish philologist and lexicographer

The Most Excellent Paz Battaner
- Born: María Paz Battaner Arias; 19 March 1938 (age 88); Salamanca, Spain

Seat s of the Real Academia Española
- Incumbent
- Assumed office 29 January 2017 (Note: Elected on 3 December 2015)
- Preceded by: José Luis Pinillos Díaz

María Paz Battaner Arias (Salamanca, 19 March 1938) is a Spanish philologist and lexicographer. Since 29 January 2017 member of Spanish Royal Academy. She was elected on December 3, 2015, to fill the chair s, vacant since the death in 2013 of José Luis Pinillos Díaz. She has directed and published several dictionaries and carried out numerous works on the didactics of the language. Her main lines of research are lexicology and lexicography, 19th century political language, specialised language and the didactics of the Spanish language.

== Biography ==
He graduated in Romance Philology at Salamanca University (1960). At that time, they taught at this university Alonso Zamora Vicente, Fernando Lázaro Carreter and Antonio Tovar, especially with the couple formed by the former and María Josefa Canellada. She was an assistant professor at that University (1960-1962) and between 1962 and 1963 Assistant of Spanish Language at the Bordeaux Academy; from 1963 to 1980 she taught at secondary schools in Vitoria, Murcia and Hospitalet de Llobregat. He earned his doctorate in 1973 with the thesis Vocabulario político y social en España, 1869-1873, directed by Eugenio de Bustos, printed five years later (1977). She then worked from 1980 to 1993 as a full professor at Universidad de Barcelona. From 1993 to the present, she is Professor of Spanish Philology at Universidad Pompeu Fabra and coordinated the research group Infolex of its Instituto Universitario de Lingüística Aplicada (University Institute of Applied Linguistics). He is a member of Euralex, DSNA and AELEX and is part of the steering committee of the Revista de Lexicografía. She directed thirteen doctoral theses and advised Televisión Española on the show Hablando claro (1988-1992). She was Dean of the Faculty of Translation and Interpretation at Pompeu Fabra University (1993-1999). From May 2008 until March 2015 she was Síndic de Greuges of Pompeu Fabra University.

In 2006 she was awarded Medalla Narcís Monturiol by Generalitat de Catalunya. Currently (2015) she is Emeritus Professor of Spanish Philology at Universidad Pompeu Fabra and chaired AELEX (Asociación Española de Estudios Lexicográficos). He participated in the project "Semantic grouping and lexicological relations in the dictionary" directed by Janet DeCesaris. (2009-2011) and works on an Electronic Dictionary of Learning (ELE, Español como Lengua Extranjera; Spanish as a foreign language).

== Works ==
- 2005 El corpus PAAU 1992: estudios descriptivos, textos y vocabulario.With Sergi Torner (eds.). Barcelona: Institut Universitari de Lingüística Aplicada, Universitat Pompeu Fabra.
- 2002 Diccionario de uso del español de América y España(Vox) ISBN 84-7774-1735
- 2001 Lema.Diccionario de Lengua Española (Vox) ISBN 84-8332-213-7
- 1998 Diccionario de Primaria (9-12 años). Anaya-Vox ISBN 84-7153-954-3 y 0-658-00066-7
- 1989 Introducción a la enseñanza de la lengua y literatura españolas. With Juan Gutiérrez Cuadrado y Enrique Miralles, Ed. Alhambra ISBN 84-205-1159-5.
- 1977 Vocabulario político y social en España, 1869-1873. Madrid: Anejos del Boletín de la Real Academia Española
