= Juan López Pacheco, Duke of Escalona =

The Most Excellent Juan Pablo López Pacheco Duke of Escalona
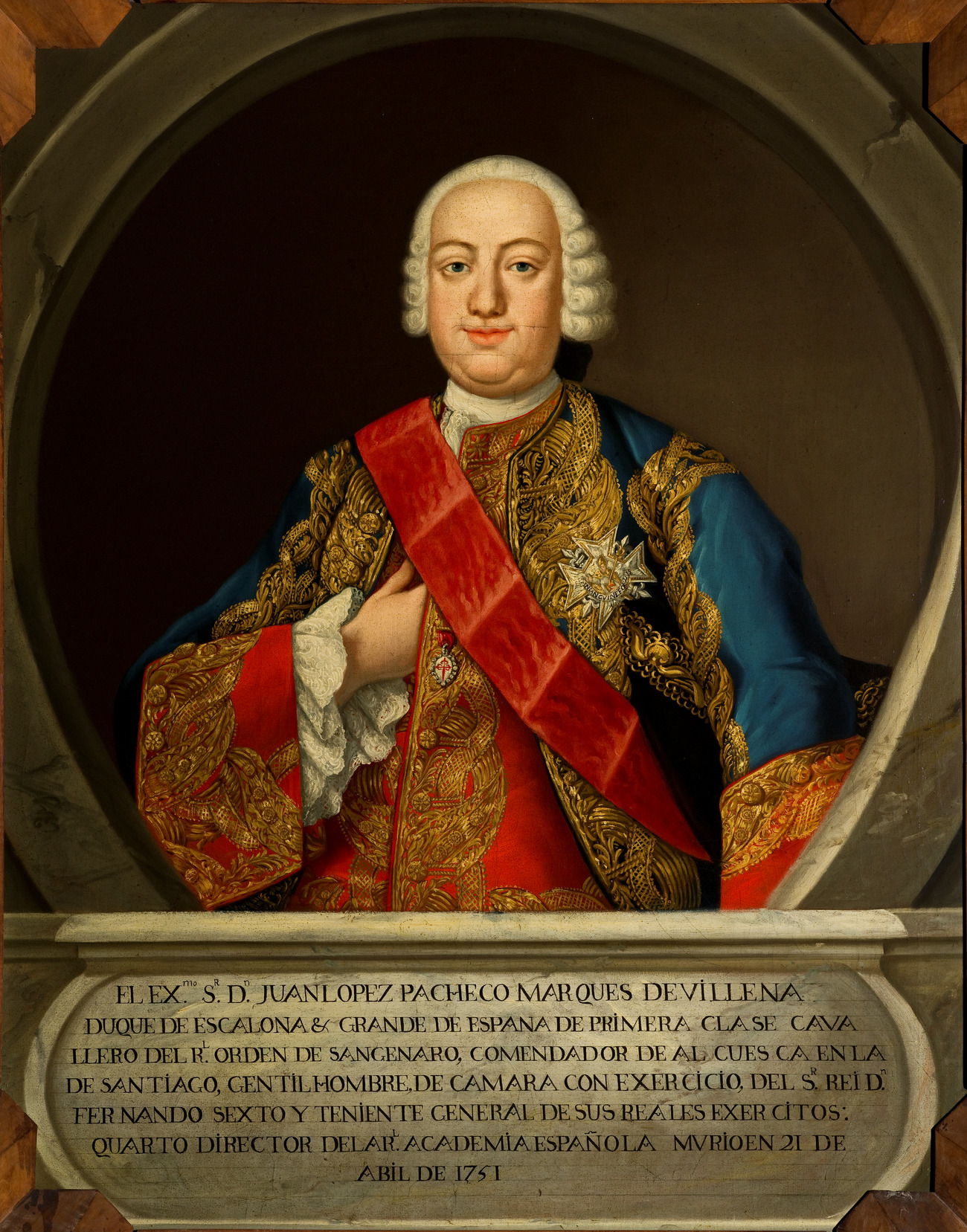
- Portrait at the Real Academia Española, 1758
- Born: Juan Pablo Francisco López Pacheco y Moscoso Acuña Manrique Silva Girón y Portocarrero; 22 March 1716; Madrid, Spain
- Died: 27 April 1751 (aged 35); Madrid, Spain

Seat Q of the Real Academia Española
- In office 26 June 1738 – 27 April 1751
- Preceded by: Mercurio López Pacheco
- Succeeded by: Martín de Ulloa

Director of the Real Academia Española
- In office 19 July 1746 – 27 April 1751
- Preceded by: Andrés Fernández Pacheco
- Succeeded by: José de Carvajal y Lancáster

Juan Pablo Francisco López Pacheco y Moscoso Acuña Manrique Silva Girón y Portocarrero, Grandee of Spain, Duke of Escalona and Lord of Garganta la Olla (Madrid, 22 March 1716 – Madrid 27 April 1751). Member of the Royal Spanish Academy since 10 June 1738, aged 22, becoming the 4th Director of the Royal Spanish Academy in 1746. was promoted to Grandee of Spain, 18 September 1750. Lieutenant General of the Spanish Royal Army, member of the Order of Santiago with several titles of Marquis and Count.

He married on 10 November 1748, aged 36, with Maria Lopez Pacheco de Toledo y Portugal, (Madrid, 22 August 1729 - Madrid, 28 November 1768), 11th Countess of Oropesa, 10th Countess of Alcaudete and many other titles.

He was the son of a second marriage of Mercurio Antonio López Pacheco y Benavides.

Government offices
Preceded by Andrés Fernández Pacheco	Director of the Royal Spanish Academy; 1746–1751	Succeeded by José de Carvajal y Lancáster
Spanish nobility
Preceded by Diego López Pacheco	Lord of Garganta la Olla; 1732–1751	Succeeded by Felipe Pérez Pacheco
Preceded by Andrés Fernández Pacheco	Duke of Escalona; 1746–1751	Succeeded by Felipe López-Pacheco de la Cueva
