= Eugenio Sellés =

Spanish journalist and writer (1842–1926)

The Most Excellent Eugenio Sellés Marquess of Gerona
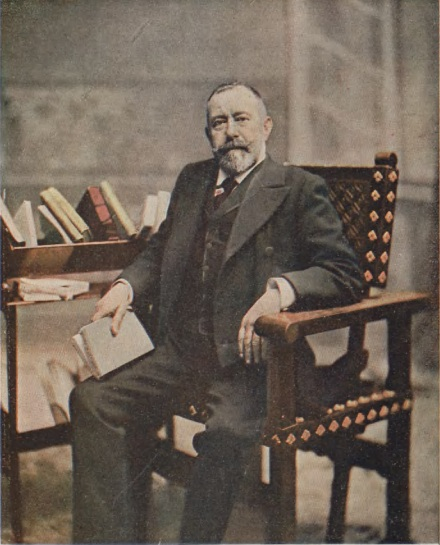
- Portrait by Kaulak
- Born: Eugenio Sellés y Ángel; 8 April 1842; Granada, Spain
- Died: 12 October 1926 (aged 84); Madrid, Spain

Seat X of the Real Academia Española
- In office 2 June 1895 – 12 October 1926
- Preceded by: Aureliano Fernández-Guerra
- Succeeded by: Rafael Sánchez Mazas (Note: Sánchez Mazas was elected for the position in 1940 but never took the seat)

Eugenio Sellés y Ángel, Marquess of Gerona and Viscount of Castro and Orozco (8 April 1842 - 12 October 1926) was a Spanish writer, journalist, playwright and politician.

== Life ==
Eugenio Sellés was born in Granada. His father, Pedro Sellés y Garrido, was a magistrate in the city, with other duties and appointments also necessitated a substantial amount of travelling to other Spanish cities. Through his mother, Francisca de Paula Ángel y Castro, Eugenio was a member of the nobility, descended from Governor Mariano Álvarez de Castro.

He studied Law at the Royal College in Granada, before qualifying at Madrid in 1862. Shortly afterwards he received a further qualification in Burgos and embarked on a legal career as a prosecutor in Extremadura. In 1869 he switched to political journalism. He supported Sagasta's progressivism, contributing to newspapers and periodicals such as La Iberia, La Revolución, El Universal, El Imparcial, El Pueblo, El Globo and ABC.

During the regency under General Serrano, Sellés was the governor of Seville and Granada. With the restoration he switched again, pursuing a vocation as a dramatist, emerging as a leading disciple of José Echegaray, albeit with a quite different dramatic style. On 2 June 1895 he was appointed a member of the Royal Academy in Madrid, delivering his inaugural address on the subject of Journalism ("El periodismo"). He also headed up the literary section of the Madrid Athenæum.

Eugenio Sellés married Avelina de Rivas y Cano. Their daughter, Elisa Sellés y Rivas, was born on 16 May 1885.

== Theatrical works (not a complete list) ==
- La torre de Talavera (1877)
- El nudo gordiano (1878)
- Las vengadoras (1884)
- La vida pública (1885).
- La mujer de Lot (1896).
- Ícara, (1910).
- Maldades que son justicias.
- El cielo y el suelo.
- Las esculturas de carne.
- La balada de la luz (1900), zarzuela, music by Amadeu Vives.
- Campanas y cornetas (1902), zarzuela, music by Joaquín Valverde.
- La Barcarola, 1901, zarzuela, music by Amadeu Vives.
- La Nube, 1902, zarzuela, music by Amadeu Vives.
- El Corneta de la partida, 1903, zarzuela, music by Joaquín Valverde.
- Guardia de honor, 1905, zarzuela, music by Ruperto Chapí.
- Amor en capilla, 1908, zarzuela, music by de Ruperto Chapí.
