= Miguel Colmeiro Penido =

Spanish author and botanist (1816–1901)

Miguel Colmeiro
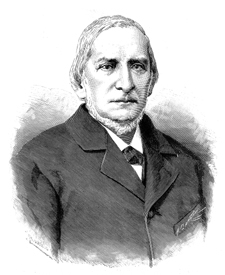
- Born: Miguel Colmeiro y Penido; 22 October 1816; Santiago de Compostela, Spain
- Died: 21 June 1901 (aged 84); Madrid, Spain
- Board member of: Royal Academy of Sciences and Arts of Barcelona; Spanish Royal Academy of Sciences (1860–1901); Real Sociedad Española de Historia Natural (since 1871); Royal National Academy of Medicine

Seat C of the Real Academia Española
- In office 11 May 1893 – 21 June 1901
- Preceded by: Cristino Martos y Balbí (Note: Martos was elected for the position in 1884 but never took the seat)
- Succeeded by: José María Asensio

Miguel Colmeiro y Penido (22 October 1816–21 June 1901) was a Spanish botanist, and member of the Spanish Royal Academy of Sciences (Real Academia de Ciencias Exactas, Físicas y Naturales).

== Biography ==
Colmeiro was born on 22 October 1816 in Santiago de Compostela. He was the rector of the Faculty of Sciences in the Complutense University of Madrid where he later became the Dean. He had been the Director of the Real Jardín Botánico de Madrid, and professor of Phytography and Botanical Geography. He also was a member of the Spanish Royal Academy of Sciences and of the Real Academia Nacional de Medicina de España.

He is known as the author of many notable botanical works. He was one of the founder of the Real Sociedad Española de Historia Natural. He received the Knight Grand Cross of the Civil Order of María Victoria. He died in Madrid on 21 June 1901.

== Honors ==
Eponymous

- (Asteraceae) Cirsium colmeiroanum
- (Asteraceae) Hieracium colmeiroanum
- (Malvaceae) Malva colmeiroi
- (Oleaceae) Phillyrea × colmeiroana
- (Rhamnaceae) Rhamnus × colmeiroi

== Works ==
- "Exámen de las encinas y demas árboles de la Península que producen bellotas : con la designacion de los que se llaman mestos" by Colmeiro, Miguel, 1816-1901; Geofrin, José María; Boutelou, Esteban
- "La botánica y los botánicos de la Peninsula Hispano-Lusitana : estudios bibliográficos y biográficos" 1858
- "Enumeración y revisión de las plantas de la península hispano-lusitana e Islas Baleares" 1886-89.

The standard author abbreviation Colmeiro is used to indicate this person as the author when citing a botanical name.
