= Verdugo Hills =

Verdugo Hills may refer to:

- Verdugo Mountains, California, United States
- Verdugo Hills (album), an album by Caroline Lufkin
- Verdugo Hills Council, a Boy Scout council
