= Aureliano Fernández-Guerra =

Spanish historian, epigrapher and antiquarian

The Most Excellent Aureliano Fernández-Guerra
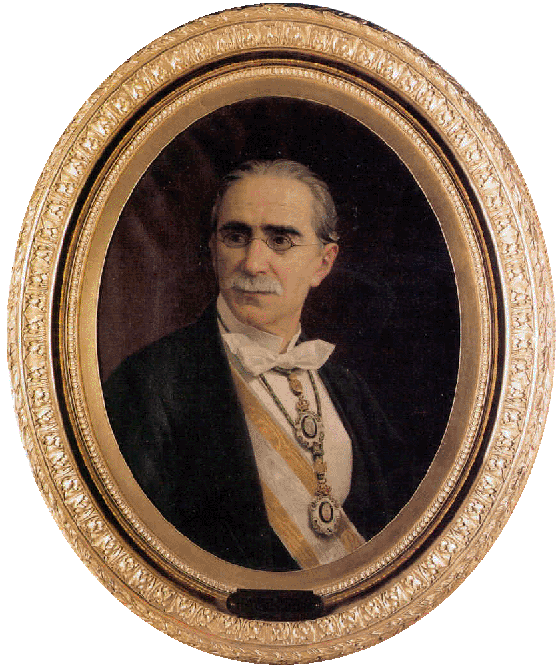
- Born: Aureliano Fernández-Guerra y Orbe; 16 June 1816; Granada, Spain
- Died: 7 September 1894 (aged 78); Madrid, Spain

Seat X of the Real Academia Española
- In office 21 June 1857 – 7 September 1894
- Preceded by: Jerónimo de la Escosura
- Succeeded by: Eugenio Sellés

Aureliano Fernández-Guerra y Orbe (16 June 1816 – 7 September 1894) was a Spanish historian, epigrapher and antiquarian, also remembered as a poet and playwright.

== Biography ==
Fernández-Guerra became a member of the Real Academia Española from 1857 and served as its Archivist and Librarian from 1872.
