= El verdugo =

El verdugo may refer to:

- "El Verdugo" (short story), a short story by Honoré de Balzac
- The Executioner (1963 film) (Spanish: El Verdugo), a Spanish film directed by Luis García Berlanga
- El verdugo de Sevilla, a 1942 Mexican film
