= Juan Armada y Losada =

Spanish politician and aristocrat (1861–1932)

The Most Excellent The Marquess of Figueroa
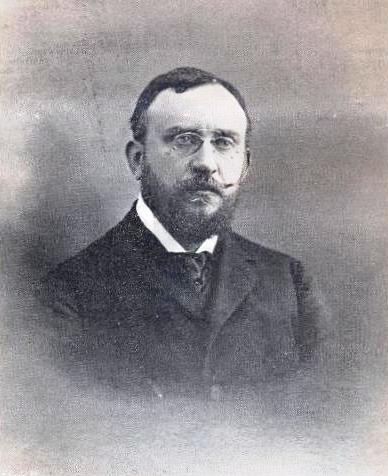
- Born: Juan Armada y Losada; 4 May 1861; Madrid, Spain
- Died: 22 September 1932 (aged 71); Abegondo, Spain

Seat K of the Real Academia Española
- In office 20 October 1918 – 22 September 1932
- Preceded by: Francisco Fernández de Béthencourt
- Succeeded by: Gregorio Marañón

Juan Armada y Losada, 10th Marquess of Figueroa (May 4, 1861, in Madrid – September 22, 1932, in Abegondo) was a Spanish politician and aristocrat. He was the 29th Solicitor General of Spain, acting President of the Congress of Deputies, Minister of Development and Minister of Justice. He was a novelist and a poet both in Spanish and Galician.
