= Mercurio López Pacheco, 9th Duke of Escalona =

Spanish aristocrat and academician

The Most Excellent Mercurio Antonio López Pacheco 9th Duke of Escalona
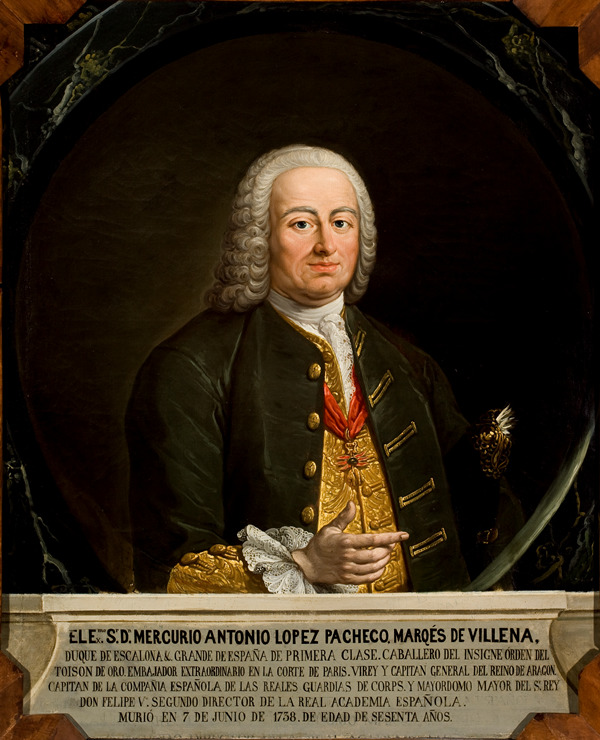
- Portrait at the Real Academia Española, 1757
- Born: Mercurio Antonio López Pacheco y Portugal Acuña Manrique Silva Girón y Portocarrero; 9 May 1679; Escalona (Toledo), Spain
- Died: 7 June 1738 (aged 59); Madrid, Spain

Seat Q of the Real Academia Española
- In office 15 April 1714 – 7 June 1738
- Preceded by: Seat established
- Succeeded by: Juan López Pacheco

Director of the Real Academia Española
- In office 29 June 1725 – 7 June 1738
- Preceded by: Juan Manuel Fernández Pacheco
- Succeeded by: Andrés Fernández Pacheco

Mercurio Antonio López Pacheco y Portugal Acuña Manrique Silva Girón y Portocarrero, twice Grandee of Spain, 9th Duke of Escalona, 9th Marquis of Villena, 15th Count of Castañeda, 11th Count of San Esteban de Gormaz and 9th Count of Xiquena (Escalona, 9 May 1679 – Madrid, 7 June, 1738), was a Spanish aristocrat and academician.

He was the son of the 1st Director of the Royal Spanish Academy (founded 1713) Juan Manuel Fernández Pacheco 8th Duke of Escalona, and himself was its 2nd lifetime Director from 1725 to 1738. He was promoted to be a Knight of the Order of the Golden Fleece in 1724 and was Mayordomo mayor to the King and chief of his Royal Household from 1725 to 1738.

== Some references ==
- http://www.fuenterrebollo.com/Heraldica-Piedra/marqueses-villena-segovia.html

Government offices
Preceded by Juan Manuel Fernández Pacheco	Director of Royal Spanish Academy; 1725-1738	Succeeded by Andrés Fernández Pacheco
Spanish nobility
Preceded by Juan Manuel Fernández Pacheco	Duke of Escalona; 1725-1738	Succeeded by Andrés Fernández Pacheco
Preceded by Juan Manuel Fernández Pacheco	Marquis of Villena; 1725-1738	Succeeded by Andrés Fernández Pacheco
Preceded by Juan Manuel Fernández Pacheco	Count of Castañeda; 1725-1738	Succeeded by Andrés Fernández Pacheco
Preceded by Juan Manuel Fernández Pacheco	Count of San Esteban de Gormaz; 1725-1738	Succeeded by Andrés Fernández Pacheco
Preceded by Juan Manuel Fernández Pacheco	Count of Xiquena; 1725-1738	Succeeded by Andrés Fernández Pacheco
