= José María Asensio =

Spanish historian, journalist, biographer and writer

The Most Excellent José María Asensio
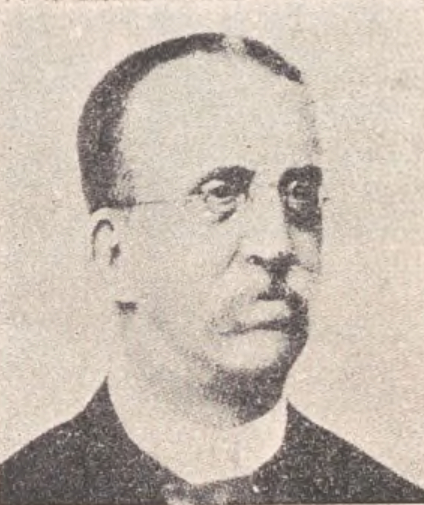
- Born: José María Asensio Toledo; 14 August 1829; Seville, Spain
- Died: 14 December 1905 (aged 76); Madrid, Spain

Seat C of the Real Academia Española
- In office 29 May 1904 – 14 December 1905
- Preceded by: Miguel Colmeiro Penido
- Succeeded by: Antonio Fernández Grilo (Note: Fernández Grilo was elected for the position in 1906 but never took the seat)

José María Asensio Toledo (14 August 1829 – 14 December 1905) was a Spanish historian, journalist, biographer and writer.

== Works ==
- The Conde de Lemos, protector of Cervantes, 1880.
- New documents to illustrate the life of Miguel de Cervantes Saavedra, Sevilla, 1864.
- Cervantes and his works. Articles., Barcelona: F. Seix, 1902.
- Don Pedro I of Castile, his reign, his character
- Christopher Columbus, his life, his travels
- The remains of Christopher Columbus are in Havana. Proof by José María Asensio. Sevilla: Printing and Spanish and Foreign Bookseller D. Rafael Tarascó and Lasa, 1881.
- Martin Alonso Pinzon: Madrid historical study: Modern Spain, 1892.
- Francisco Pacheco : artistic and literary works especially true book description and memorable portraits of illustrious men, who left unpublished: notes that may serve as an introduction to this book if it ever gets published (Sevilla: Lithography and bookstore Spanish and Foreign José M ª Geofrin, 1867 and Seville: Francisco Alvarez and C ª, printers, 1876)
- Fernan Caballero : biographical study. Madrid: Modern Spain, 1900.
- The interpretations of Don Quixote.
- Note some books, articles and pamphlets on the life and works of Miguel de Cervantes Saavedra Seville: [sn], 1885 (Imp of E. Rasco)
- An eighteenth-century Portuguese cervantista burned by the Holy Office of the Inquisition: biographical notes, Seville: [sn], 1885 (Imp of E. Rasco)
- Hercules: Conde de Montesquieu poem. Seville: [sn], 1878 (Imp of Gironés and Orduña)
- Cervantes and his works: literary letters, directed at various friends, Seville: [sn], 1870 (Imp that was José María Geofrin)
- Catalog of some books, pamphlets and loose items relating to life and to the works of Miguel de Cervantes ..., Sevilla: Printing and Rafael Library Tarascó and Lassa, 1872
- Liceo Seville: speech read by the Vice-President Mr. D. Honorary José María Asensio in the inaugural session ... Seville: [sn], 1875 (Francisco Alvarez and Ca, Printers)
- Pictures of Spanish, taken in fac-simile, old editions of his works: first series 1563–1701 ... Seville: [sn], 1869 (Henry Litogr. Utrera)
- Speeches read before the Royal Academy of Fine Arts Sevillana the 23 April 1871, Sevilla: Imp and Bookstore, Sierpes Street, 35 old, modern 73, 1871.
