= La Peraleja =

- municipality
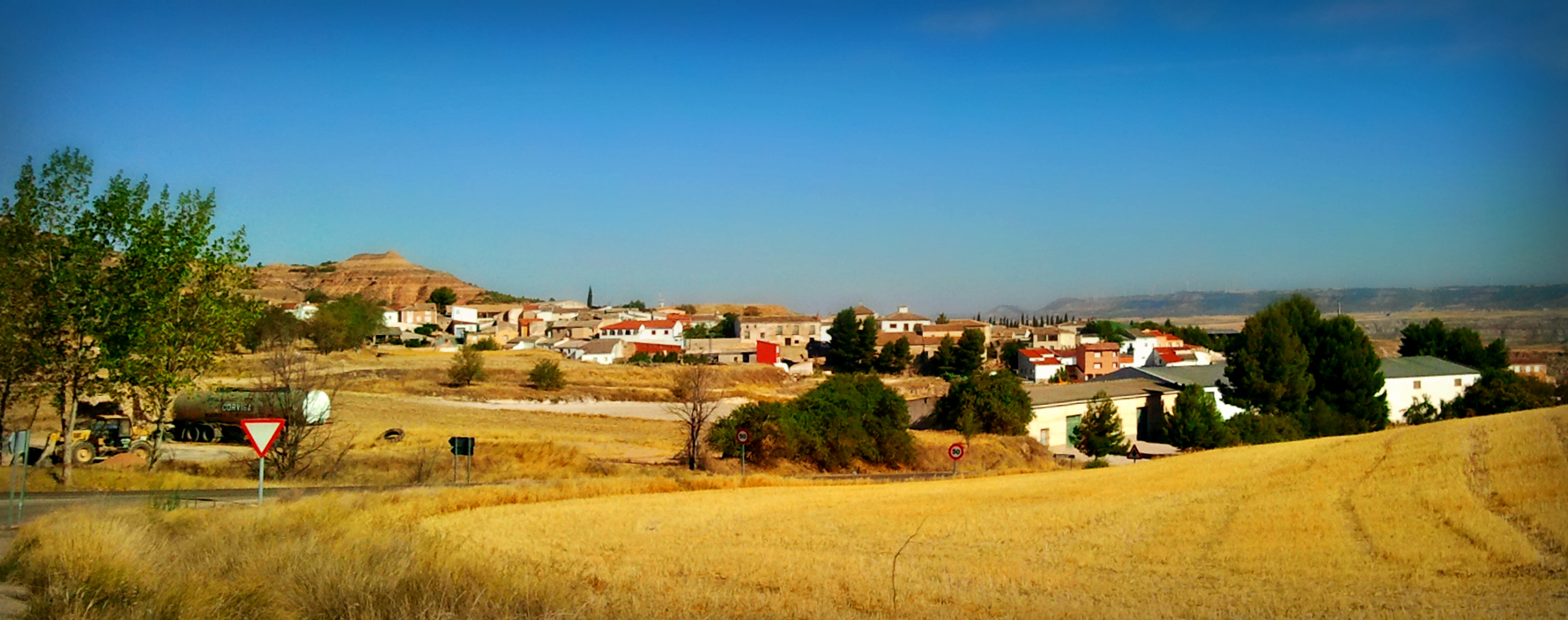
- View of the town.

- Coat of arms

- Location within Spain Location within Castilla-La Mancha
- Country: Spain
- Autonomous community: Castile-La Mancha
- Province: Cuenca

Area
  - Total: 34 km^{2} (13 sq mi)

Population (2025-01-01)
  - Total: 77
  - Density: 2.3/km^{2} (5.9/sq mi)
- Time zone: UTC+1 (CET)
  - Summer (DST): UTC+2 (CEST)

La Peraleja is a municipality located in the province of Cuenca, Castile-La Mancha, Spain. According to the 2004 census (INE), the municipality has a population of 139 inhabitants.
