= Francisco Fernández de Béthencourt =

Spanish politician (1850–1916)

The Most Excellent Francisco Fernández de Béthencourt
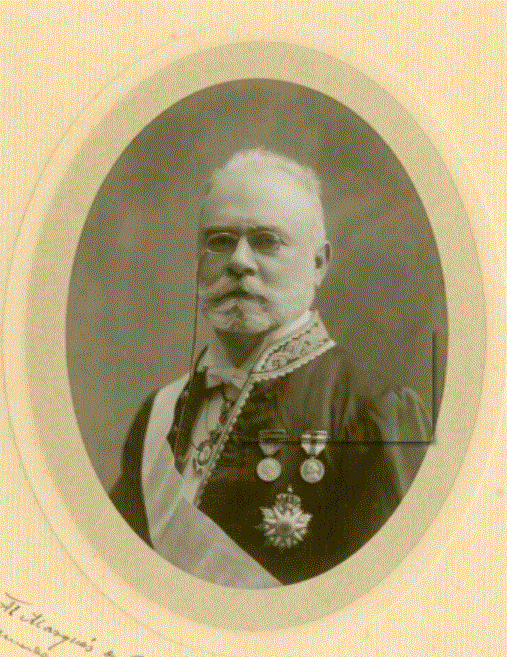
- Pictured in the early 1900s
- Born: 27 July 1850; Arrecife, Spain
- Died: 2 April 1916 (aged 65); Madrid, Spain

Seat K of the Real Academia Española
- In office 10 May 1914 – 2 April 1916
- Preceded by: Andrés Mellado
- Succeeded by: Juan Armada y Losada

Francisco Fernández de Béthencourt (27 July 1850 – 2 April 1916), was a Spanish writer, politician and genealogist. He was a member of parliament for Santa Cruz de Tenerife and later a senator at the Cortes on behalf of the conservative party.

He was born at Arrecife, in the Canary Islands, to Francisco-Ramón Fernández-Martínez y Delgado and María de la Concepción de Bethencourt y Mújica.

In 1914, he was admitted into the Royal Spanish Academy. He died 2 years later, 2 April 1916 in Madrid.
