= Alonso Verdugo, 3rd Count of Torrepalma =

Spanish count, diplomat and poet (1706-1767)

The Most Excellent Alonso Verdugo de Castilla 3rd Count of Torrepalma
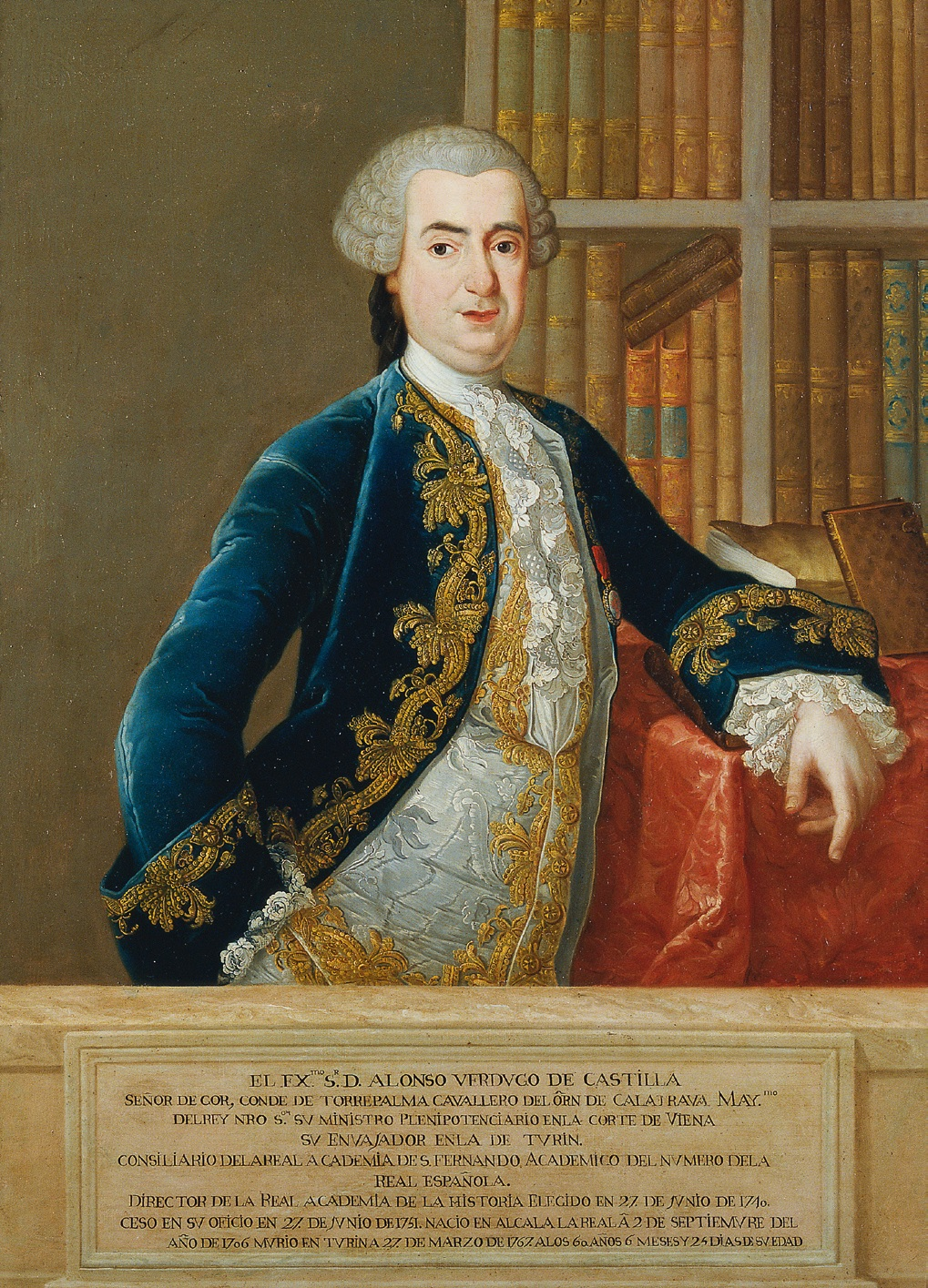
- Portrait by Ginés Andrés de Aguirre (1768), Real Academia de la Historia, Madrid
- Born: 3 September 1706; Alcalá la Real, Spain
- Died: 27 March 1767 (aged 60); Turin, Kingdom of Sardinia

Seat P of the Real Academia Española
- In office 10 June 1740 – 27 March 1767
- Preceded by: Jerónimo Pardo
- Succeeded by: Ignacio de Hermosilla

Alonso Verdugo de Castilla (3 September 1706 – 27 March 1767) was a Spanish count, diplomat and poet.

== Biography ==
He was the son of Pedro Verdugo, 2nd Count of Torrepalma, a Knight of the Order of Alcantara from Seville, and Isabel de Castilla y Lasso de Castilla, (1672–1737), from Granada, who descended from an illegitimate child King Pedro I of Castile (1334–1369).

He became the 3rd Count of Torrepalma in 1720, on the death of his father. He became a member of the Maestranza de Caballeria of Granada aged 19, on 18 October 1725, and a Knight of the Order of Calatrava in 1756, aged 50.

From 1740 to 1767, he was a member of the Real Academia Española, and the Real Academia de la Historia, a plenipotentiary minister for Spain in Vienna from 1755 to 1760 and from 1760 to 1767 in Turin, Italy, then the capital of the Duchy of Savoy.

He married in April 1753 María Francisca Dávila y Carrillo de Albornoz, granddaughter of the Duke of Montemar. They had no issue.
