= Tomás Antonio Sánchez =

Spanish historian

Tomás Antonio Sánchez de Uribe (Cantabria, 1723–1802, Madrid), was a controversial ecclesiastic and the first editor of several basic texts of Spanish Medieval Literature, including the Cantar del Mio Cid. He served as Royal Librarian.
