= Andrés Fernández Pacheco, 10th Duke of Escalona =

Spanish aristocrat and academician

The Most Excellent Andrés Fernández Pacheco 10th Duke of Escalona
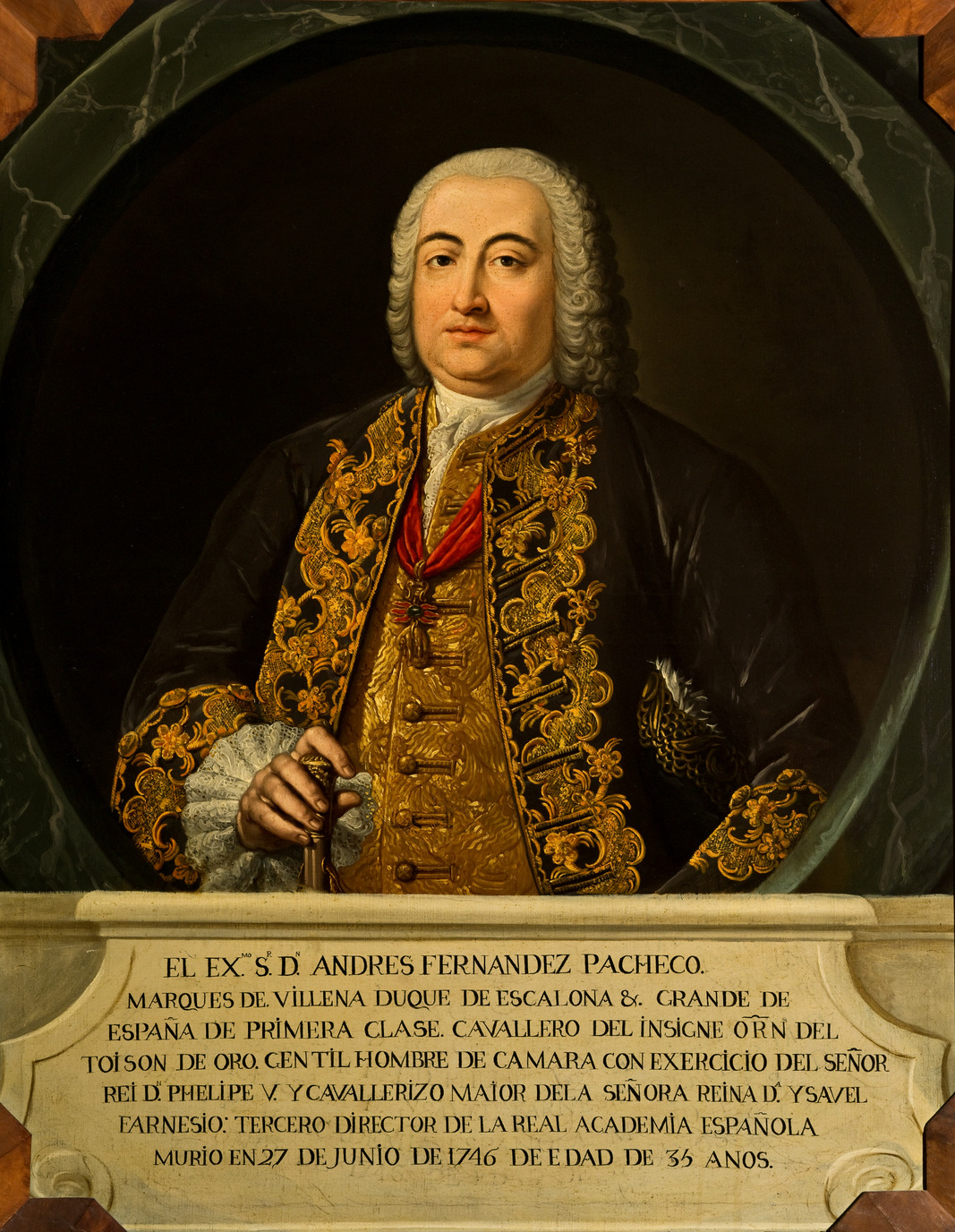
- Portrait at the Real Academia Española, 1757
- Born: Andrés María Hipólito Casiano José Antonio Cayetano Fernández Pacheco y Moscoso Acuña Silva Manrique Girón Portocarrero y Portugal; 13 August 1710; Madrid, Spain
- Died: 27 June 1746 (aged 35); Madrid, Spain

Seat C of the Real Academia Española
- In office 25 May 1726 – 27 June 1746
- Preceded by: Alonso Rodríguez Castañón
- Succeeded by: Francisco Antonio de Angulo

Director of the Real Academia Española
- In office 10 June 1738 – 27 June 1746
- Preceded by: Mercurio López Pacheco
- Succeeded by: Juan López Pacheco

Andrés María Hipólito Casiano José Antonio Cayetano Fernández Pacheco y Moscoso Acuña Silva Manrique Girón Portocarrero y Portugal, twice Grandee of Spain, 10th Duke of Escalona, 10th Marquis of Villena, 16th Count of Castañeda, 12th Count of San Esteban de Gormaz and 10th Count of Xiquena (13 August 1710 – 27 June 1746), was a Spanish aristocrat and academician.

He was born and died in Madrid, the grandson and son of the 1st and 2nd Directors of the Royal Spanish Academy, respectively. Himself became a member at the age of 16, on 25 April 1726. He married Ana María de Toledo Portugal y Córdoba, 11th Countess of Oropesa in 1727, who gave him two daughters and died in 1729. He married for a second time with Isabel María Pacheco Téllez-Girón y Toledo in 1731. Fernández Pacheco became the 3rd lifetime Director of the Royal Spanish Academy at the death of his father in 1738 (aged 28). He was promoted to be a Knight of the Order of the Golden Fleece. He died at the age of 36 in 1746.

He was succeeded as Duke of Escalona by his daughter María López Pacheco, who married her uncle and his brother, Juan López Pacheco.

== Some references ==
- http://www.fuenterrebollo.com/Heraldica-Piedra/marqueses-villena-segovia.html

Government offices
Preceded by Mercurio López Pacheco	Director of Royal Spanish Academy; 1738-1746	Succeeded by Juan López Pacheco
Spanish nobility
Preceded by Mercurio López Pacheco	Duke of Escalona; 1738-1746	Succeeded by María López Pacheco
Preceded by Mercurio López Pacheco	Marquis of Villena; 1738-1746	Succeeded by María López Pacheco
Preceded by Mercurio López Pacheco	Count of Castañeda; 1738-1746	Succeeded by María López Pacheco
Preceded by Mercurio López Pacheco	Count of San Esteban de Gormaz; 1738-1746	Succeeded by María López Pacheco
Preceded by Mercurio López Pacheco	Count of Xiquena; 1738-1746	Succeeded by María López Pacheco
