= Manuel Villegas Piñateli =

Manuel Villegas Piñateli was a member of the Royal Spanish Academy from 1714 to 15 October 1752.

Villegas was a secretary at the Captaincy General of Galicia, secretary to King Charles II of Spain, and to King Philip V of Spain.

He was listed as a "language authority" in the first 18th century edition of the Official Spanish Language Dictionary. In 1736, Villegas' two-volume work on Russia was published, entitled Historia de Moscovia y vida de sus zares, con una descripción de todo el imperio, su gobierno, religión, costumbres y genio de sus naturales. Madrid, Imprenta del convento de la Merced), 2 vols (1736).

In the book he talks about the travels by Jesuit father Antonio Possevino (born 1534, Ferrara, Italy; died February 26, 1611) acting as papal legate circa 1580. Possevino was the first Jesuit to visit Moscow, and was vicar general of Sweden, Denmark and the northern islands, Muscovy, Livonia, Rus, Hungary, Pomerania, Saxony from 1578.

Villegas was buried at the Chapel of the Christ of Burgos in the Church of San Nicolás, Madrid.
