= Diego López Pacheco, 7th Duke of Escalona =

Mexican politician

The Most Excellent Duke of Escalona
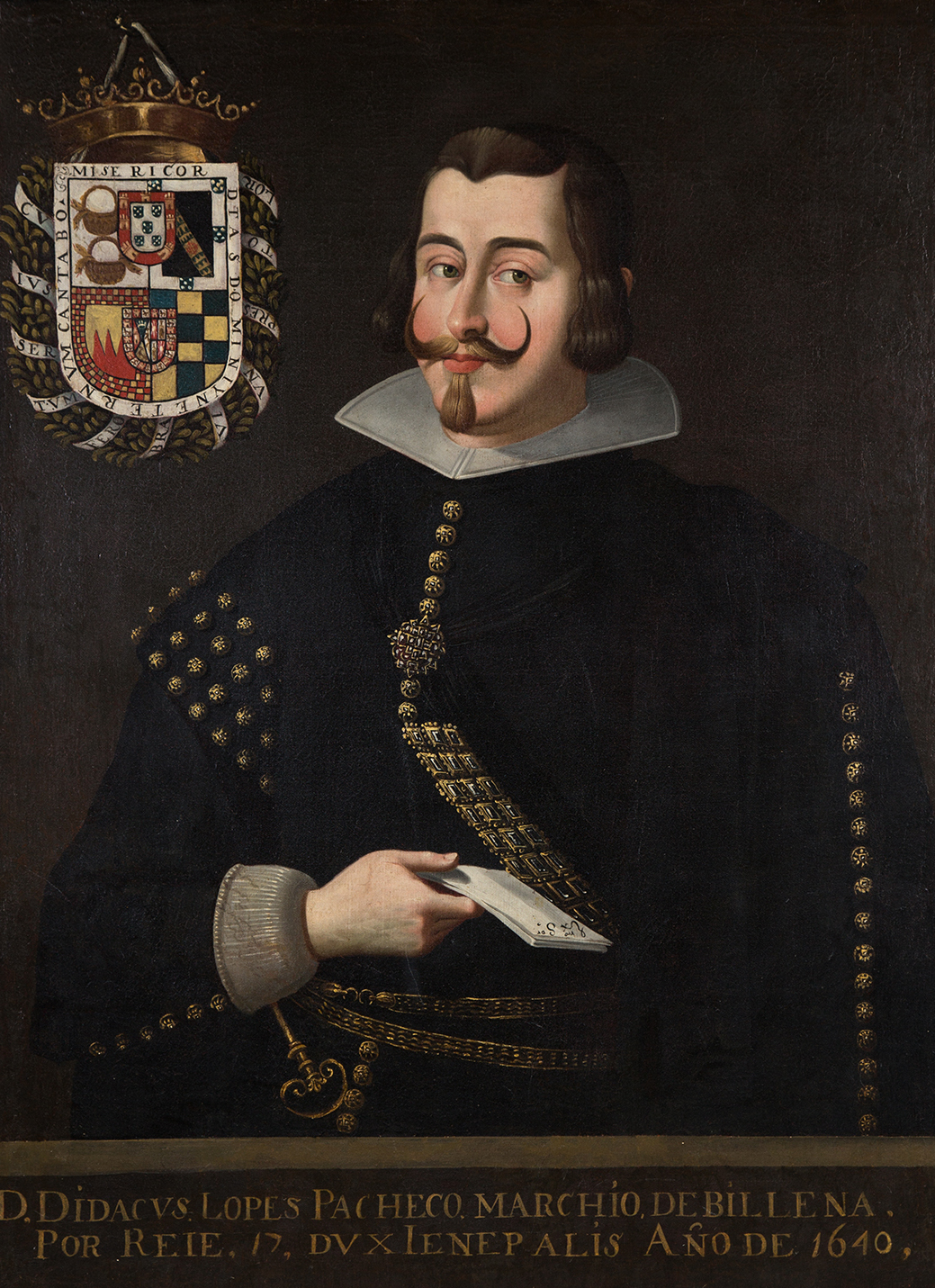
- Diego Lopez Pacheco, Cabrera y Bobadilla

17th Viceroy of New Spain
- In office August 28, 1640 – June 10, 1642
- Monarch: Philip IV
- Valido: Count-Duke of Olivares
- Preceded by: Lopé Díez de Aux y Arméndariz
- Succeeded by: Juan de Palafox y Mendoza

43rd Viceroy of Navarre
- In office June 19, 1649 – June 4, 1653
- Monarch: Philip IV
- Valido: Luis de Haro
- Preceded by: Luis de Guzmán Ponce de Leon
- Succeeded by: Diego de Benavides, 8th Count of Santisteban

Personal details
- Born: Diego Roque López Pacheco Cabrera y Bobadilla; August 16, 1599 La Mancha, Spain
- Died: February 27, 1653 (aged 54) Pamplona, Spain
- Spouse: Luisa Bernarda de Cabrera y Bobadilla Juana de Zúñiga y Sotomayor
- Children: Juan Manuel Fernández Pacheco, 8th Duke of Escalona
- Parent(s): Juan Fernandez Pacheco, 5th Duke of Escalona; Serafina de Portugal Braganza
- Occupation: Politician and noble

Don Diego Roque López Pacheco Cabrera y Bobadilla, 7th Duke of Escalona, 7th Marquess of Villena and 7th Count of Xiquena (16 August 1599, La Mancha, Spain – 27 February 1653, Pamplona, Spain) was a Spanish nobleman who was viceroy of New Spain from August 28, 1640, to June 10, 1642.

== Early life ==
López Pacheco was born into one of the most aristocratic families of Iberia. His father was Juan Fernandez Pacheco, 5th Duke of Escalona, and his mother Serafina de Portugal Bragança, daughter of John I, 6th Duke of Braganza.
He was educated at the University of Salamanca, where he became rector. He made a name for himself as a man of letters and a man of arms. He served in the Tercios (Spanish infantry), where he rose to the rank of colonel.

== Viceroy of New Spain ==
On January 22, 1640, López Pacheco was named viceroy, under King Philip IV of Spain. He arrived in Veracruz on June 24 of that year, together with Juan de Palafox y Mendoza, bishop of Puebla. The bishop had been commissioned visitador general to begin proceedings against the two previous viceroys, Rodrigo Pacheco, 3rd Marquess of Cerralvo and Lope Díez de Armendáriz, marqués de Cadereyta.

López Pacheco was delayed some months in the port by the festivities celebrating his arrival. He made his solemn entry into Mexico City on August 28. He soon found himself popular, in spite of the introduction of tax stamps and remitting of more tribute to Spain.

While still in Veracruz, he was informed of the pressing need to reinforce the Armada de Barlovento, which guarded the coast and shipping from corsairs. He immediately took up this project, renovating six warships, ordering the construction of others, and obtaining several more from Cartagena and Havana. He ordered the casting of cannons and the production of munitions, gunpowder and rigging.

In 1641 Luis Cetin de Canas, governor of Sinaloa solicited and obtained the viceroy's approval to send an expedition to colonize the Californias with Jesuit missionaries. This was not successful. Also during López Pacheco's term, a change occurred in the parish churches of the colony; a majority of them were now held by secular clergy rather than the regular friars.

== Revolution in Portugal ==
In the previous year (1640) a revolution broke out in Portugal, and the Duke of Braganza, a first cousin of the viceroy, was crowned King John IV, initiating the Portuguese Restoration War. This naturally led to questions about the viceroy's loyalty. To allay the suspicions, López Pacheco ordered that all Portuguese residents in New Spain register with the government, for control of their movements, possessions and activities. However, he remained under suspicion.

The visitador general, Bishop Palafox y Mendoza, who was already involved in proceedings against earlier viceroys, broke with the current viceroy in 1642, accusing him again of being in league with Portugal. This was probably on orders from the Crown — at least Bishop Palafox claimed to have the orders, although he did not show them. The bishop arrived secretly in the capital, and in the middle of the night of June 9/10, he met with the Audiencia and laid out his suspicions. He then ordered that the viceregal palace be surrounded by guards. The following morning Viceroy López Pacheco was informed that the bishop had been named archbishop and viceroy.

López Pacheco was moved to the convent of Churubusco as a prisoner, and a few days later he was moved out of the capital to San Martín Texmelucan. His possessions were confiscated and sold at public auction.

A few months later he returned to Spain, where after a short trial he was found innocent of the accusations against him. The king restored part of the money he had lost through confiscation and offered to restore the viceregency, but López Pacheco was not willing to return to Mexico. The king instead made him governor of Sicily, and later (1649) viceroy of Navarre.

Government offices
Preceded by Lope Díez de Armendáriz	Viceroy of New Spain; 1640–1642	Succeeded by Juan de Palafox
Preceded by Luis de Guzmán Ponce de Leon	Viceroy of Navarre; 1649–1653	Succeeded by Diego de Benavides
Spanish nobility
Preceded by Felipe Fernández Pacheco	Duke of Escalona; 1633–1653	Succeeded by Juan Manuel Fernández Pacheco
Preceded by Felipe Fernández Pacheco	Marquis of Villena; 1633–1653	Succeeded by Juan Manuel Fernández Pacheco
Preceded by Felipe Fernández Pacheco	Count of Xiquena; 1633–1653	Succeeded by Juan Manuel Fernández Pacheco
Preceded by José López Pacheco	Marquess of Moya; 1643–1653	Succeeded by Juan Manuel Fernández Pacheco
Preceded by José López Pacheco	Count of San Esteban de Gormaz; 1633–1653	Succeeded by Juan Manuel Fernández Pacheco
