= Escalona =

- Municipality
- Escalona del Alberche

- Flag Coat of arms

- Location of Escalona within Castilla-La Mancha Escalona (Spain)
- Coordinates: 40°10′15″N 4°24′19″W
- Country: Spain
- Autonomous community: Castilla-La Mancha
- Province: Toledo
- Comarca: Torrijos
- Judicial district: Torrijos
- Founded: Ver texto

Government
  - Alcalde: Álvaro Gutiérrez Prieto (2007)

Area
  - Total: 73 km^{2} (28 sq mi)
- Elevation: 550 m (1,800 ft)

Population (2025-01-01)
  - Total: 3,987
  - Density: 55/km^{2} (140/sq mi)
- Demonym: Escaloneros
- Time zone: UTC+1 (CET)
  - Summer (DST): UTC+2 (CEST)
- Postal code: 45910
- Dialing code: 925
- Website: Official website

Escalona is a municipality located in the north of the province of Toledo, which in turn is part of the autonomous community of Castile-La Mancha, Spain. According to the 2017 census (INE), the municipality has a population of 3,240 inhabitants, many of whom live in the several housing estates outside the town itself.

The town lies 30 metres above the right bank of the river Alberche, in the comarca of Torrijos, which is a part of the historical region of New Castile.

== History ==
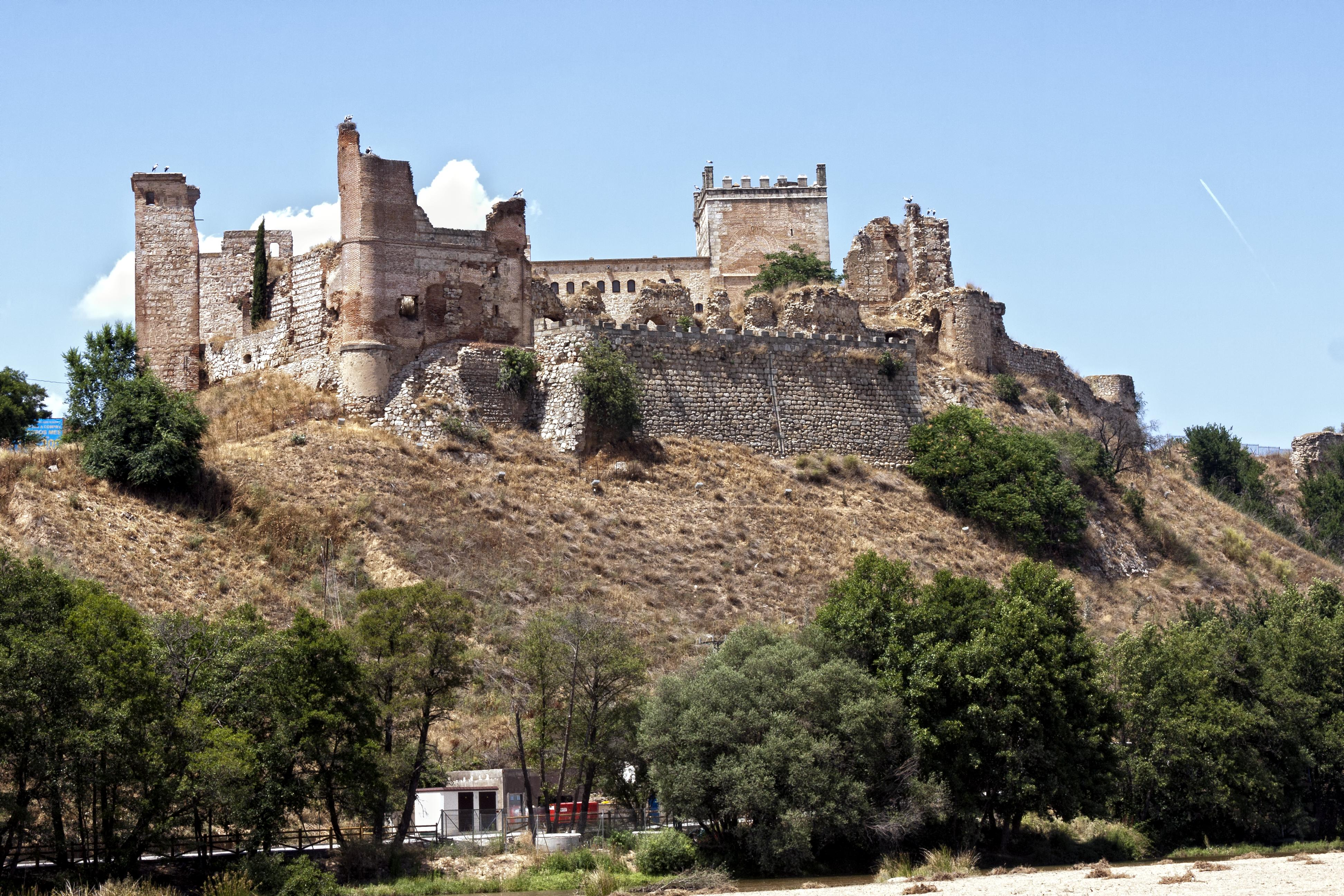
Castle of Escalona (2009)

Escalona's strategic location, on the Alberche river and between Avila and Toledo, suggests there may have been a fortress there in Roman times or during the Visigoth period. Following the conquest of Toledo (1085), by Alfonso VI of León and Castile, it was a key defensive point against raids by the Almoravides and Almohades that attacked the place in 1131, 1137 and, again, in 1196.

The Mudéjar-style Castle of Escalona, built in the 15th century, is the most characteristic building of the town.

Historically, there was a Jewish community in Esacalona, dating to before the Christian conquest in 1083, but remained in the town after it. The rights of the Jews in Escalona were established by the town's municipal charter, granting them equal status with Christians and Moors. A Jewish quarter existed from 1477 to 1489; in 1483, the Muslim mosque was included in the Jewish quarter. Isaac Abarbanel had business interests in Escalona. The community continued to exist until the 1492 expulsion of the Jews.

== Demographics ==
Historical population
Year	Pop.	±%
1900	1,272	—
1910	1,553	+22.1%
1920	1,634	+5.2%
1930	1,758	+7.6%
1940	1,821	+3.6%
1950	1,806	−0.8%
1960	1,643	−9.0%
1970	1,429	−13.0%
1981	1,537	+7.6%
1991	1,763	+14.7%
2001	2,193	+24.4%
2011	3,540	+61.4%
2021	3,441	−2.8%
2023	3,669	+6.6%
Source: INE

== Twin towns ==
- Villena, Spain
- Peñafiel, Spain

== Notable people ==
- Jerónimo de Cevallos (1560–1641), jurist. He was the subject of El Greco's Portrait of Jerónimo de Cevallos (1613)
- Dukes of Escalona
- Juan Manuel (1282–1348), writer
- Esteban de Aguilar y Zúñiga, theologian
