= José Luis Pinillos Díaz =

Spanish psychologist

The Most Excellent José Luis Pinillos
- Born: José Luis Pinillos Díaz; 11 April 1919; Bilbao, Spain
- Died: 4 November 2013 (aged 94); Madrid, Spain

Seat s of the Real Academia Española
- In office 18 December 1988 (Note: Elected on 28 April 1988) – 4 November 2013
- Preceded by: Seat established
- Succeeded by: Paz Battaner

José Luis Pinillos Díaz (11 April 1919 – 4 November 2013) was a Spanish psychologist. He spent 20 years as the psychology chair at the Complutense University of Madrid. Considered the father of contemporary Spanish psychology, Pinillos wrote a textbook, Principios de Psicología, that was once used by most introductory psychology courses in Spain.

== Career ==
Early in his career, Pinillos went to Germany to work with Hans Walter Gruhle and to England to work under Hans Eysenck. He came back to Madrid in 1953, going to work for the Spanish National Research Council. In 1961, he spent a brief period at the University of Caracas, coming back to Spain later that year to take a psychology position at the University of Valencia. In 1966, he was named the psychology chair at the Complutense University of Madrid, and he retired from that post in 1986.

Pinillos is considered the father of modern Spanish psychology. He was a member of the Real Academia de Ciencias Morales y Políticas (Royal Academy of Moral and Political Sciences) and the Royal Spanish Academy. He served as vice-secretary of the Royal Spanish Academy in 1989–1990. He wrote Principios de Psicología (Principles of Psychology), which was at one time the textbook used by the majority of introductory psychology courses at Spanish universities.

During the coup d'état of 23 February 1981, Pinillo was in contact with senior officials of the Adolfo Suárez government to assess the behavior of the Congress of Deputies assailants and predict their behavior. That night, in a call with the Undersecretary of Territorial Planning Juan Díez Nicolás and a member of the provisional civilian government, Pinillos advised not to free the Congress, because "at night everything is magnified, and now they will be emboldened for having demonstrated their power against the politicians, but at dawn they will collapse". A few hours later the coup d'état failed.

In 1986, he earned a Principe de Asturias Award, and he received honorary doctorates from several Spanish universities.
