= Pedro Verdugo, 2nd Count of Torrepalma =

Spanish noble and academician (1657-1720)

The Most Excellent Pedro Verdugo de Albornoz 2nd Count of Torrepalma
- Born: Pedro Verdugo de Albornoz Ursúa; 22 November 1657; Carmona, Spain
- Died: 3 October 1720 (aged 62); Granada, Spain

Seat X of the Real Academia Española
- In office 6 June 1715 – 3 October 1720
- Preceded by: Seat established
- Succeeded by: Fernando de Bustillos y Azcona

Pedro Verdugo de Albornoz Ursúa, 2nd Count of Torrepalma (22 November 1657 – 3 October 1720) was a Spanish noble and academician.

== Life and career ==
He was a knight of the Order of Alcantara since 1668, and upon the death of his father Alonso Verdugo y Albornoz (1623–1680) he became the second count of Torrepalma. Between 1715 and 1720, he was a member of the Real Academia Española de la Lengua, the organization charged with setting standards for the Spanish language, which had been founded only three years earlier in 1712 by King Philip V of Spain.

He was born in Carmona, in the province of Sevilla, and baptized in Seville on November 22, 1657. He was the father of Alonso Verdugo de Castilla (1706–1767), the third count of Torrepalma, who was also a member of the royal academy from 1740 to 1767.
