= Waldstein =

Waldstein may refer to:

- Waldstein Sonata, a popular name for Beethoven's Piano Sonata No. 21

== People ==
- House of Waldstein, a noble family from Bohemia
  - Albrecht von Wallenstein or von Waldstein (1583–1634), Bohemian military leader and politician, a major figure in the Thirty Years' War
  - Adam von Waldstein (1570–1638), Czech noble, Supreme Burgrave of the Kingdom of Bohemia
  - Count Ferdinand Ernst Gabriel von Waldstein (1762–1823), German noble, patron of Beethoven to whom the sonata is dedicated
  - Franz de Paula Adam von Waldstein (1759–1823), Austrian soldier, explorer and naturalist, older brother of the above
  - Marie-Anne Waldstein (1763–1808), Marchioness of Santa Cruz, Austrian-Spanish aristocrat and painter, sister of Ferdinand and Franz
- Charles Waldstein (1856–1927), Anglo-American archaeologist and Olympic shooter
- Felix Waldstein (1862–1943), German politician

== Geography ==
- Waldstein (mountain range), a ridge in the Fichtelgebirge Mountains in Bavaria, Germany
- Großer Waldstein, a mountain in province of Upper Franconia in Bavaria, Germany
- Mount Waldstein, a mountain in the Absaroka Range of Montana, United States
- the former German name for Borowo-Młyn, a village in the administrative district of Gmina Pobiedziska, within Poznań County, Greater Poland Voivodeship, in west-central Poland

== See also ==
- Wok of Waldstein a notable figure among the Hussites of Prague in the 15th century
- Waldstein Castle, a ruined castle in Baden-Württemberg, Germany
- Valdštejn Castle or Burg Waldstein, a castle in Semily, Czech Republic
- Wald (disambiguation)
