= Marquis de Arcicóllar =

Spanish noble title

Marquis de Arcicóllar is a Spanish noble title created by Charles II of Spain on 13 May 1680. The title was first given to Luisa Fernanda de Córdoba by Charles II in 1680. This title has remained in the Marquis de Santa Cruz family since then. Among the holders were José Fernández-Villaverde y Roca de Togores, Spanish Ambassador to the Court of Saint James (1958–1972) married to Casilda de Silva y Fernández de Henestrosa, XIV Marchioness de Santa Cruz.

== Marqueses de Arcicóllar ==
| | Title | Period |
Created by Charles II of Spain
| I | Luisa Fernández de Córdoba y Santillán | 1680- |
| II | Francisca Josefa Fernández Dávila y Córdoba | |
| III | María Fernández Dávila y Zúñiga (1698- | |
| IV | María Loreto Leonor Dávila y Zúñiga (1684-1749) | |
| V | María Cayetana Sarmiento Dávila y Zúñiga (1707-1756) | |
| VI | José Joaquín de Silva Sarmiento (1734-1802) | 1744-1802 |
| VII | José Gabriel de Silva Waldstein (1782-1839) | 1802-1839 |
| VIII | Francisco de Borja de Silva Téllez-Girón (1815-1889) | 1839-1889 |
| IX | Juan Evangelista de Silva Tellez-Girón (1828-1896) | 1889-1896 |
| X | José de Silva y Borchgrave d'Altena (1866-1938) | 1896-1938 |
| XI | Casilda de Silva y Fernández de Henestrosa (1914-2008) | 1984-1985 |
| XII | Rafael Fernández-Villaverde de Silva (1949-) | 1985-Current holder |
