= Mayordomo mayor =

High Steward of Spain

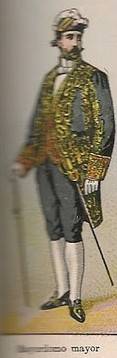
Court dress of the "Mayordomo mayor" in 1900

The Mayordomo mayor (High Steward) was the Officer of the Royal Household and Heritage of the Crown of Spain in charge of the person and rooms of the King of Spain.
The Office of “Mayordomo mayor” was introduced with the accession of Charles V to the throne in 1516, and suppressed after the proclamation of the Second Spanish Republic in 1931 and never re-created after the restoration of the Monarchy in 1975, but it can be said that it is the historical precedent of the modern Head of the Royal Household of Spain.

== Historical precedents ==
Being a historical precedent the Office of “Mayordomo mayor del Rey” of the Kingdom of Castile (1149-1516), the “Mayordomo mayor” of the King of Spain was in charge of the entire organization of the Royal Palace and of its government, having civil and even criminal jurisdiction within its walls through the so-called “Bureo” tribunal.

== Regime during the 19th and 20th centuries ==
Diverse dispositions regulated in the 19th and 20th centuries his functions, but they must be outlined the Royal decrees of October 28 of 1847 and September 4 of 1885.

During the reigns of the last three Kings before the Second Spanish Republic, Isabel II, Alfonso XII and Alfonso XIII, the “Mayordomo mayor” coordinated the whole palatial organization being, from 1840, the highest Office of the Royal Court and such denominated “Jefe Superior de Palacio” (High Chief of the Palace). Only a peer that had the rank of Grandee of Spain could be nominated for this Office.

Also, traditionally, the “Mayordomo mayor” was higher hierarchically than the “Sumiller de Corps”. During the reign of Alfonso XII and part of the reign of Alfonso XIII (until 1907) this latter Office was suppressed.

The “Mayordomo mayor” was equally the holder of the privy seal, or “Guardasellos” as he was called. In that position he assured the signature of all sort of documents by the King and the link between him and the Government.

He did not have jurisdiction as in former times but the Prosecution Law required his official permission for every police inspection within the walls of all the Royal palaces.

In that which concerned to his role in the activities of official nature, the “Mayordomo” intervened, between others:

- In royal births and baptisms where the invitations were dispatched by him, occupying the immediate site behind the Monarch.
- In Public Chapels where he delivered the prayer-book to the King and was placed, also, immediately behind.
- In the Lavatory of Poor, during Easter, in which he helped the Monarch to serve the plates in the later lunch that was offered.
- In the ceremony of the Coverage of the Grandees where he dispatched the invitations on behalf of the King and fixed the order.
- In official banquets in which he occupied one of the head-boards of the table.
- In official audiences in which he fixed the day and hour.
- In public ceremonies, in which he was placed in the first position close to the Caballerizo mayor.

Under the “Mayordomo” they were the King of Arms, as charged with the heraldry, the processes of titles of nobility and the management of the dignities. The dean of this class in 1931 was Don Jose de Rújula and Ochotorena, Marquess of Ciadoncha. The Office of King of Arms was suppressed after the proclamation of the Second Spanish Republic in 1931 and never re-created after the restoration of the Monarchy in 1975. He was, at the same time, the high chief of the Court honorary servants called “Gentilhombres Grandes de España con ejercicio y servidumbre” (Gentlemen of the bedchamber Grandees of Spain), of the “Mayordomos de semana” (Weeckly stewards literally) and of those called “Gentilhombres de camara con ejercicio” (Gentlemen of the bedchamber), both (but especially the first and second ones) with certain duties attached to the person of the King.

Also the Physicians of Chamber were under his dependence with a salary of 10.000 pesetas per year each one, accompanying the King in trips, hunts etc. Traditionally the Physician of Chamber who assisted to royal births was awarded with the peerage as it was the case of the first Marquess of San Gregorio and the first Count of San Diego. In 1931 the Physicians of the Chamber were Don Jacobo Lopez Elizagaray and Don Fernando Enríquez of Salamanca.

Also, this Office of Physician was suppressed after the proclamation of the Second Spanish Republic in 1931 and never re-created after the restoration of the Monarchy in 1975.

The Private Secretary to the King was also under the “Mayordomo”. He was in charge of the ordinary matters of the Monarch and was his more faithful assistant. During almost the whole reign of Alfonso XIII, and in the moment of his exile, this Office was held by Don Emilio de Torres y Gonzalez-Arnáu, first Marquess of Torres de Mendoza.

The last office under the “Mayordomo” was the General Inspector of the Royal Palaces, the former "Aposentador" (Office that the painter Diego Velázquez had occupied in the 17th century), with an annual wage of 12.500 pesetas. The General Inspector was the real steward and butler to the King. At the fall of the monarchy, this office was occupied by Don Luis de Asúa y Campos. He had his own office in all the Royal residences and was the chief of the watchmen, the doormen, the footmen and the personnel of the so-called "Ramillete", who were the servants and footmen who served at the royal table and the craftsmen of the different workshops (watchmakers, cabinet-makers, cooks, janitors, etc.). All of these offices were equally suppressed in 1931 and no longer exist.

In the reign of Alfonso XIII the wages of the “Mayordomo” were 15.000 pesetas per year and had his own office and quarter at the Royal Palace of Madrid. Likewise, he was always awarded with the highest distinctions of the Kingdom, the neck chain of the Order of the Golden Fleece and the grand cross of the Order of Charles III.

The uniform of the “Mayordomo” was “casacón” (frock coat) with embroidery in all the seams.

He was styled “Excelentísimo señor Mayordomo mayor de Su Majestad” as well as “Sumiller de Corps” and “Guardasellos” (when he held the privy seal).

== List of mayordomos mayores (high stewards) to the Spanish monarch ==
=== Charles V, Holy Roman Emperor, 1516–1556 ===
- 1512–1518: Ferry de Croy, Lord of Roeulx
- 1518-1518: Diego de Guevara, Lord of Jouvel
- 1518–1522: Ferry de Croy, Lord of Roeulx
- 1522–1526: Laurent de Gorrevod, Count of Pont-de-Vaux
- 1526–1527: Charles de Lannoy, Lord of Sanzeilles, Grandee of Spain
- 1527–1529: Laurent de Gorrevod, Count of Pont-de-Vaux
- 1529–1540: Adrien de Croy, Count of Roeulx, Grandee of Spain
- 1541–1556: Fernando Álvarez de Toledo y Pimentel, Duke of Alba de Tormes, Grandee of Spain

=== Philip II, 1556–1598 ===
- 1556–1582: Fernando Álvarez de Toledo y Pimentel, Duke of Alba de Tormes, Grandee of Spain
- 1582–1598: Pedro López de Ayala, Count of Fuensalida, Grandee of Spain

=== Philip III, 1598–1621 ===
- 1598–1599: Gómez Dávila y Toledo, Marquess of Velada, Grandee of Spain
- 1599–1621: Juán Hurtado de Mendoza de la Vega y Luna, Consort-Duke of the Infantado, Grandee of Spain

=== Philip IV, 1621–1665 ===
- 1621–1624: Juán Hurtado de Mendoza de la Vega y Luna, Consort-Duke of the Infantado, Grandee of Spain
- 1629–1639: Antonio Álvarez de Toledo y Beaumont, Duke of Alba de Tormes, Grandee of Spain
- 1640–1642: Gómez de Mendoza y Manrique, Count of Castrogeriz, Grandee of Spain
- 1643–1647: Juan Alfonso Enríquez de Cabrera, Duke of Medina de Rioseco, Admiral of Castile, Grandee of Spain
- 1649–1651: Manuel de Moura y Corte-Real, Marquess of Castel-Rodrigo, Grandee of Spain
- 1651–1658: Juan Gabriel Pacheco Téllez Girón, Count of la Puebla de Montalbán, Grandee of Spain
- 1658–1660: García de Avellaneda y Haro, Count of Castrillo, Grandee of Spain
- 1660–1664: Juan Gaspar Enríquez de Cabrera y Sandoval, Duke of Medina de Rioseco, Admiral of Castile, Grandee of Spain

=== Charles II, 1665–1701 ===
- 1665–1667: Bernardo Manrique de Silva y Mendoza, Marquess of Aguilar de Campoo, Grandee of Spain
- 1667–1671: Antonio Álvarez de Toledo y Enríquez de Ribera, Duke of Alba de Tormes, Grandee of Spain
- 1671–1674: Rodrigo Díaz de Vivar de Silva y Mendoza, Duke of Pastrana and of the Infantado, Grandee of Spain
- 1674–1676: Francisco Fernández de la Cueva, Duke of Alburquerque, Grandee of Spain
- 1676–1696: Íñigo Melchor Fernández de Velasco, Duke of Frías, Grandee of Spain
- 1699–1701: Juan Clarós Pérez de Guzmán y Fernández de Córdoba, Duke of Medina Sidonia, Grandee of Spain

=== Philip V, 1701–1724 ===
- 1701–1705: Fadrique Alvarez de Toledo y Ponce de León, Marquess of Villafranca del Bierzo, Grandee of Spain
- 1705–1713: José Fernández de Velasco, Duke of Frías, Grandee of Spain
- 1713–1724: Juan Manuel Fernández Pacheco, Marquess of Villena, Grandee of Spain

=== Louis I, 1724 ===
- 1724: Juan Manuel Fernández Pacheco, Marquess of Villena, Grandee of Spain

=== Philip V, 1724–1746 ===
- 1724–1725: Juan Manuel Fernández Pacheco, Marquess of Villena, Grandee of Spain
- 1725–1738: Mercurio Antonio López Pacheco, Marquess of Villena, Grandee of Spain
- 1738–1746: Francesco María Pico, Duke of la Mirandola, Grandee of Spain

=== Ferdinand VI, 1746–1759 ===
- 1746–1747: Francesco María Pico, Duke of la Mirandola, Grandee of Spain
- 1747: Juan Manuel López de Zúñiga y Castro, Duke of Béjar, Grandee of Spain
- 1747–1753: Fadrique Álvarez de Toledo y Moncada, Marquess of Villafranca del Bierzo, Grandee of Spain
- 1753–1759: Fernando de Silva y Álvarez de Toledo, Duke of Huéscar, Grandee of Spain

=== Charles III, 1759–1788 ===
- 1759–1760: Fernando de Silva y Álvarez de Toledo, Duke of Alba, Grandee of Spain
- 1760–1781: José María de Guzmán Guevara, Marquess of Montealegre, Grandee of Spain, Grandee of Spain
- 1781–1787: Pedro de Alcántara Fernández de Córdoba y Montcada, Duke of Medinaceli, Grandee of Spain
- 1787–1788: José Joaquín de Silva-Bazán, Marquess of Santa Cruz, Grandee of Spain

=== Charles IV, 1788–1808 ===
- 1788–1802: José Joaquín de Silva-Bazán, Marquess of Santa Cruz, Grandee of Spain
- 1802–1805: Diego Ventura de Guzmán, Marquess of Montealegre, Grandee of Spain, Grandee of Spain
- 1805–1807: José Miguel de Carvajal y Manrique, Duke of San Carlos, Grandee of Spain
- 1807–1808: Benito Fernández Correa y Sotomayor, Marquess of Mos, Grandee of Spain

=== Ferdinand VII, 1808 and 1814–1833 ===
- 1808: José Miguel de Carvajal y Manrique, Duke of San Carlos, Grandee of Spain
- 1809–1810: Pedro María Jordán de Urríes y Fuembuena, Marquess of Ayerbe, Grandee of Spain (1)
- 1814–1815: José Miguel de Carvajal y Manrique, Duke of San Carlos, Grandee of Spain
- 1815–1820: Francisco de Borja Álvarez de Toledo y Gonzaga, Count of Miranda de Castañar, Grandee of Spain
- 1820–1822: Antonio María Ponce de León Dávila, Duke of Montemar, Grandee of Spain
- 1822–1823: José Gabriel de Silva-Bazán, Marquess of Santa Cruz de Mudela, Grandee of Spain
- 1823–1824: Francisco de Borja Álvarez de Toledo y Gonzaga, Count of Miranda de Castañar, Grandee of Spain
- 1824–1833: Joaquín Félix de Samaniego Urbina Pizarro y Velandia, Marquess of Valverde de la Sierra, Grandee of Spain

=== Isabella II, 1833–1868 ===
- 1833–1838: Joaquín Félix de Samaniego Urbina Pizarro y Velandia, Marquess of Valverde de la Sierra, Grandee of Spain
- 1838–1847: Juan Bautista Queralt y Silva, Count of Santa Coloma, Grandee of Spain
- 1848–1855: Juan Nepomuceno Roca de Togores y Carrasco, Count of Pinohermoso, Grandee of Spain
- 1855-1855: Carlos Martínez de Irujo y McKean, Duke of Sotomayor, Grandee of Spain
- 1856–1866: Luis Carondelet Castaños, Duke of Bailén, Grandee of Spain
- 1866–1868: Francisco Javier Arias Dávila y Matheu, Count of Puñonrostro, Grandee of Spain
- 1868: Antonio María Marcilla de Teruel-Moctezuma y Navarro, Duke of Moctezuma de Tultengo, Grandee of Spain

=== Amadeo I, 1871–1873 ===
- 1871: Carlos O'Donnell, Duke of Tetuan, Grandee of Spain
- 1871–1873: Mariano Rius y Montaner, Count of Rius

=== Alfonso XII, 1875–1885 ===
- 1875–1885: José Isidro Osorio y Silva-Bazán, Marquess of Alcañices, Grandee of Spain

=== Alfonso XIII, 1885–1931 ===
- 1885–1890: José Joaquín Álvarez de Toledo y Silva, Duke of Medina Sidonia, Grandee of Spain
- 1890–1906: Carlos Martínez de Irujo y del Alcázar, Duke of Sotomayor, Grandee of Spain
- 1906–1907: Manuel Felipe Falcó, Marquess of la Mina, Grandee of Spain
- 1907–1925: Andrés Avelino de Salabert y Arteaga, Marquess of la Torrecilla, Grandee of Spain
- 1925–1931: Luis María de Silva y Carvajal, Duke of Miranda, Grandee of Spain

(1) Mayordomo mayor in exile at Valençay

== See also ==
- Caballerizo mayor
- Gentilhombres de cámara con ejercicio
- Gentilhombres Grandes de España con ejercicio y servidumbre

== Bibliography ==
- Enciclopedia universal ilustrada europeo-americana. Volume 49. Hijos de J. Espasa, Editores.1923
- Martínez Millán José. Universidad Autónoma de Madrid. Departamento de Historia Moderna. La Corte de Carlos V. 2000
- Martinéz Millán (dir). José. La Corte de Felipe II. Madrid. Alianza 1994
- Martínez Millán, José y Visceglia, Maria Antonietta (Dirs.). La Monarquía de Felipe III. Madrid, Fundación Mapfre, 2008/2009
- Archivo General de Palacio (AGP) . Patrimonio Nacional. Sección Personal
