= Piano Sonata No. 21 =

Piano Sonata No. 21 may refer to:

- Piano Sonata No. 21 (Beethoven)
- Piano Sonata No. 21 (Schubert)
