= Fermín Francisco de Carvajal-Vargas, 1st Duke of San Carlos =

Spanish-Peruvian noble

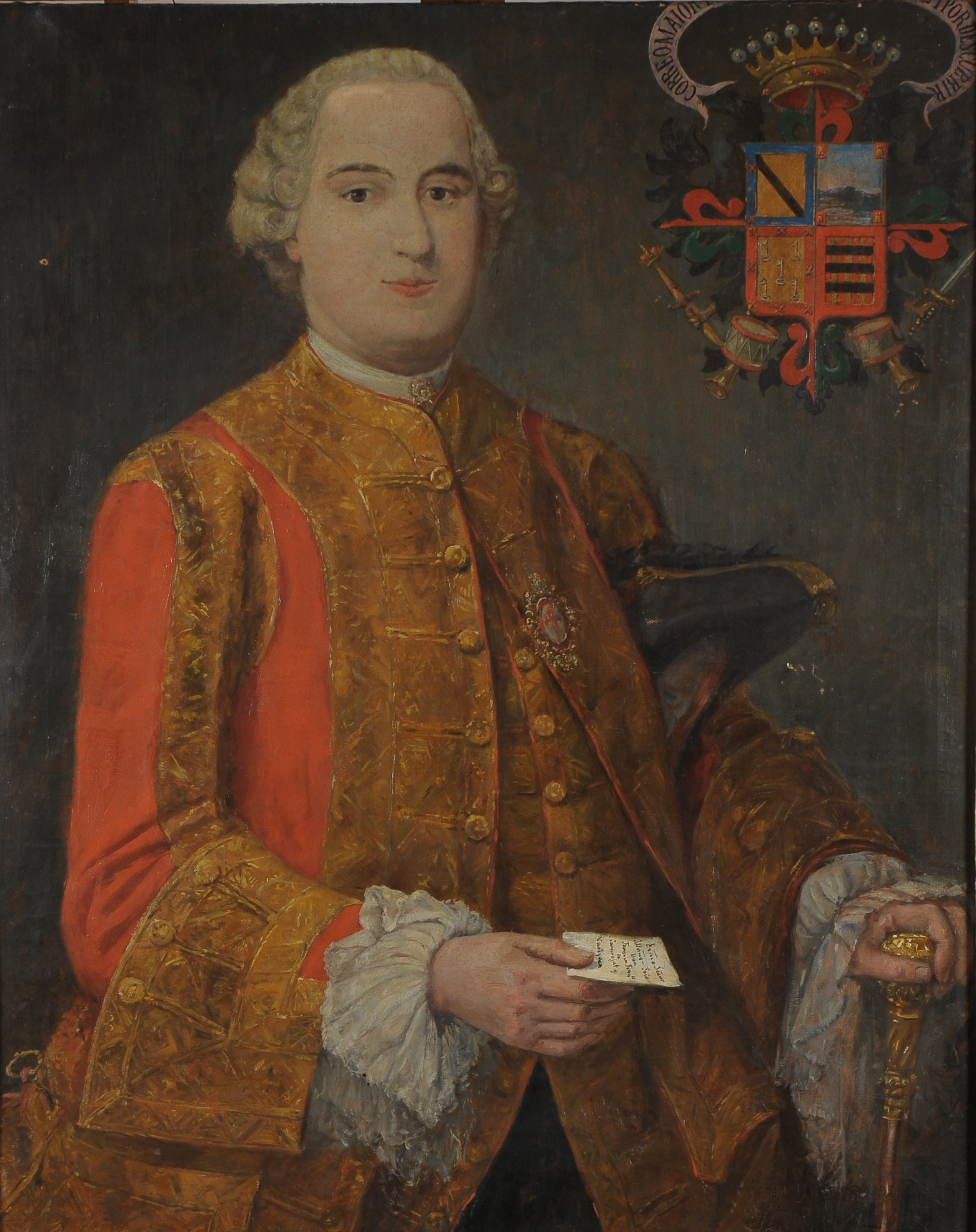
Portrait of Fermín Francisco de Carvajal Vargas

Fermín Francisco de Carvajal-Vargas y Alarcón, 1st Duke of San Carlos and Grandee of Spain (Chile, 1722 – Madrid, 1799) was a Spanish-Peruvian noble. He was the last Correo Mayor de Indias, responsible for the postal communication between the Americas and Spain.

He was married at the Cathedral of Lima on 11 June 1741 to his cousin Joaquina María Magdalena Brun y Carvajal. The couple had four children:

- Magdalena de Carvajal, later Marquise of Lara;
- Mariano Joaquín de Carvajal-Vargas (died 1796), later 5th Count of Puerto. Father of José Miguel de Carvajal-Vargas, 2nd Duke of San Carlos;
- Diego Melchor de Carvajal-Vargas;
- Luis Fermín de Carvajal, later 1st Count of La Unión.
