= José Joaquín de Silva-Bazán, 9th Marquis of Santa Cruz =

Spanish politician and noble

The Most Excellent José Joaquín de Silva-Bazán 9th Marquis of Santa Cruz GE
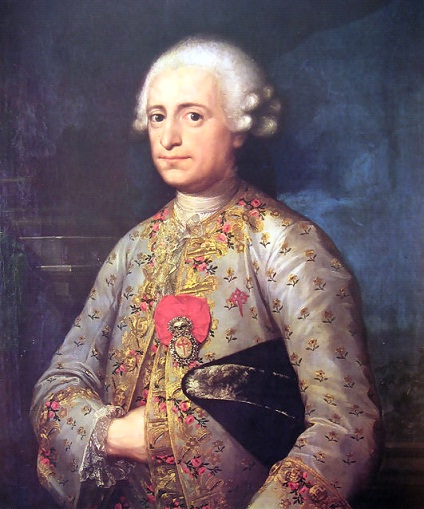
- Portrait by Anton Raphael Mengs

Mayordomo mayor
- In office 1787–1802
- Monarchs: Charles III and Charles IV
- Preceded by: 12th Duke of Medinaceli
- Succeeded by: Diego Ventura de Guzmán

Director of the Real Academia Española
- In office 1776–1802
- Preceded by: 12th Duke of Alba
- Succeeded by: Pedro de Silva y Sarmiento

Seat O of the Real Academia Española
- In office 1776–1802
- Preceded by: 12th Duke of Alba
- Succeeded by: Manuel Abella

Personal details
- Born: José Joaquín de Silva-Bazán y Sarmiento; 3 December 1734 Madrid, Spain
- Died: 2 February 1802 (aged 67) Madrid, Spain
- Spouses: María Fernández de la Cueva (m. 1755; died 1762) Mariana Waldstein (m. 1781)
- Children: Francisco de Silva-Bazán, José Gabriel de Silva-Bazán

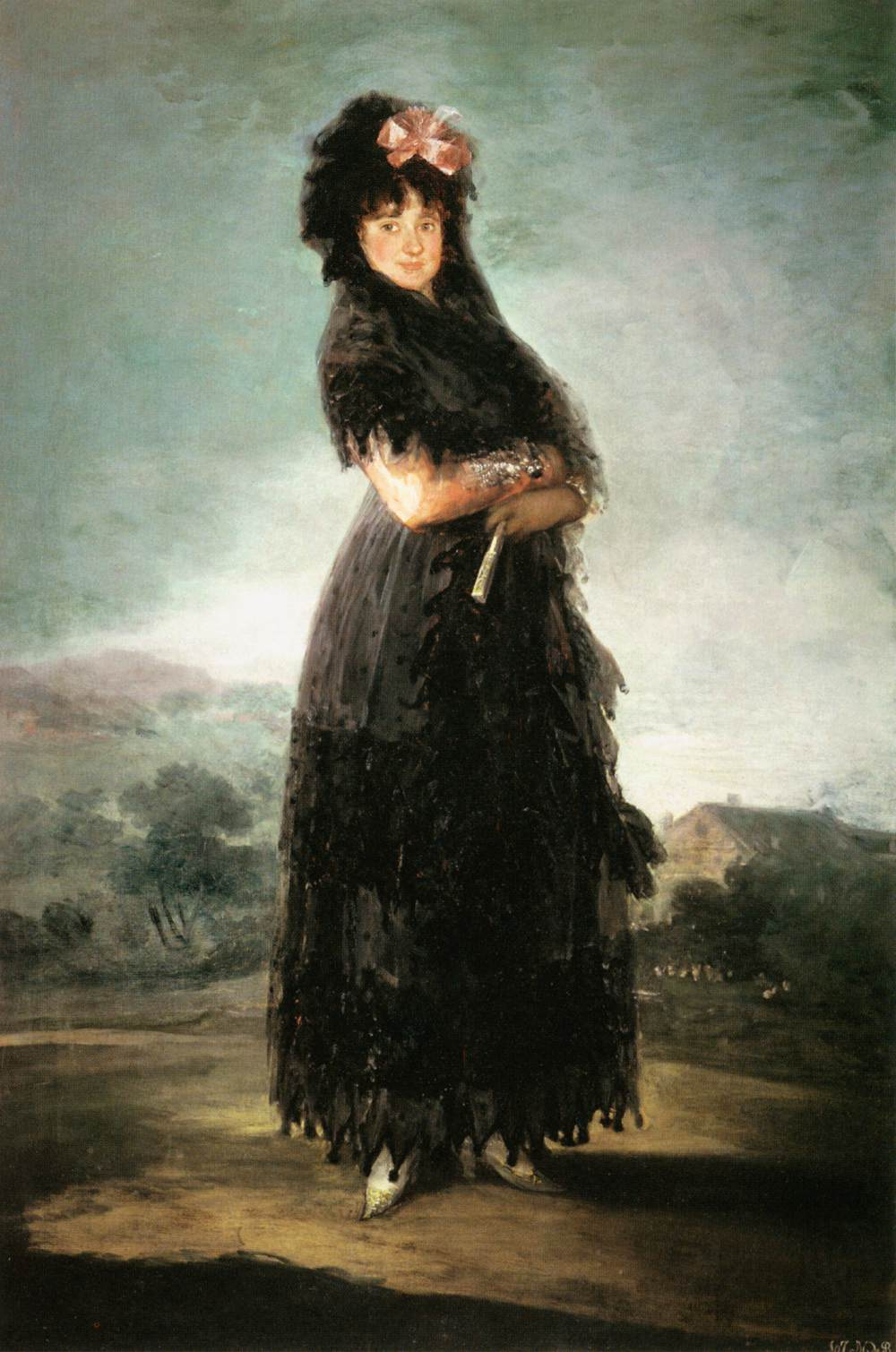
Mariana Waldstein, his second wife, painted by Goya.

José Joaquín de Silva-Bazán y Sarmiento (3 December 1734 – 2 February 1802), 9th Marquis of Santa Cruz and Grandee of Spain, Knight of the Order of the Golden Fleece, was a Spanish aristocrat who served in the Royal House.

== Biography ==
He was also 8th Marquis of Villasor, 10th of Viso, 6th of Arcicóllar, 7th and last Marquis of Bayona and Montesanto, Baron of Sant Boi and Lord of Valdepeñas, twice Grandee of Spain, and Gentleman of the Bedchamber.

His parents were Pedro de Silva-Bazán y Alagón, 8th Marquis of Santa Cruz, Mayordomo of Prince Philip, Duke of Parma, and María Cayetana Sarmiento y Dávila. His brother was the academic Pedro de Silva y Sarmiento de Alagón and his younger sister was Mariana de Silva-Bazán y Sarmiento, Duchess of Huéscar and mother of the famous Duchess Cayetana de Alba.

He was only ten years old when his father died, from whom he inherited all his titles, under the supervision of his mother.

On 2 February 1755 he married María de la Soledad Fernández de la Cueva y Silva, 6th Marchioness of Cadreita, daughter of Francisco Fernández de la Cueva y de la Cerda, 11th Duke of Alburquerque, who had been Caballerizo mayor to King Ferdinand VI. This marriage was brief as Soledad died seven years later, at the age of twenty-seven, leaving him a widower and the father of a six-year-old son: Francisco de Asís (1756–1779), who was 11th Marquis of Viso and died aged 23 without issue.

After a long widowhood, he met his second wife Mariana Waldstein in Vienna and married her in 1781. She was the daughter of Emmanuel Philibert, Count of Waldstein-Dux, and Princess Maria Anna Theresia of Liechtenstein. Mariana was the first of the Marquesas of Santa Cruz to be portrayed by Goya (the other was his daughter-in-law, Joaquina Téllez-Girón). They had four children of which José Gabriel de Silva-Bazán y Waldstein (1782–1839) would inherite all his titles.

Three years later, back in Madrid, King Charles III appointed him his Mayordomo mayor, which made him the head of the court at the palace. In 1788, the new monarch Charles IV confirmed him in his position and named him tutor to his three eldest children, including the Prince of Asturias.

A man of high culture and lover of the fine arts, he was for 30 years a patron and friend of the enlightened Canarian writer José de Viera y Clavijo, tutor to his children and whom he took on his travels through La Mancha and Europe. They visited Paris, Brussels, Italy and Central Europe, attending courses and conferences given by the most relevant scientists of the moment, on a wide variety of subjects. They met the American inventor Benjamin Franklin and also French encyclopedists such as Voltaire and D'Alembert, coinciding with the death of Jean-Jacques Rousseau. Impressed by the scientific experiments they had witnessed, they acquired machines to reproduce them in Spain and they also brought numerous books with them back to Spain. He created an industrial soap factory and a school for men and another for women in Valdepeñas.

He was elected 7th director of the Royal Spanish Academy in 1776, after the death of the Duke of Alba. During his mandate, the first editions (1780, 1783, and 1791) of the Dictionary of the Castilian Language were published in a single volume "for easier use". The academic and illustrated edition of Don Quixote (1780) also appeared, known as the Don Quixote of Ibarra, in reference to its illustrious printer, Joaquín Ibarra.

Upon his death in 1802, his remains were placed in the parish church of San Martín, Madrid. Later, in 1844, they were transferred to the cemetery of San Nicolás de Bari and in 1911, to the Cementerio de la Almudena.

Political offices
Preceded by 12th Duke of Medinaceli	Mayordomo mayor 1787-1802	Succeeded by Diego Ventura de Guzmán
Academic offices
Preceded by Fernando de Silva, 12th Duke of Alba	Director of the Real Academia Española; 1776–1802	Succeeded by Pedro de Silva y Sarmiento de Alagón
Preceded by Fernando de Silva, 12th Duke of Alba	O seat of The Royal Spanish Academy; 1776–1802	Succeeded by Manuel Abella
Spanish nobility
Preceded by Pedro de Silva-Bazán y Alagón	Marquess of Santa Cruz; 1744–1802	Succeeded by José Gabriel de Silva-Bazán
