= Marie-Anne Waldstein =

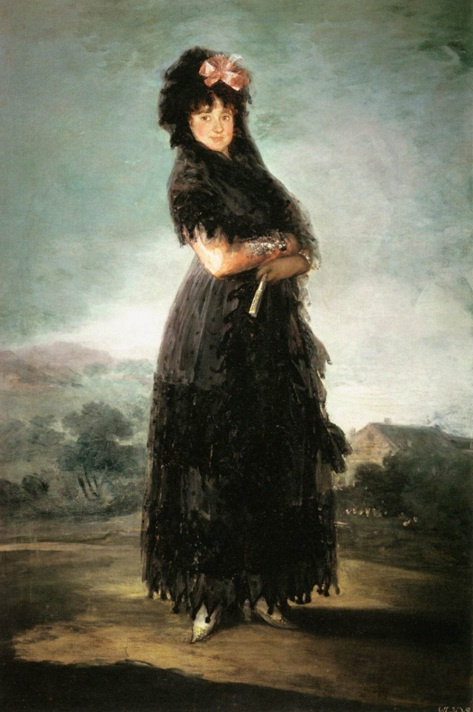
Portrait of Mariana Waldstein, 9th Marchioness of Santa Cruz, by Francisco Goya.

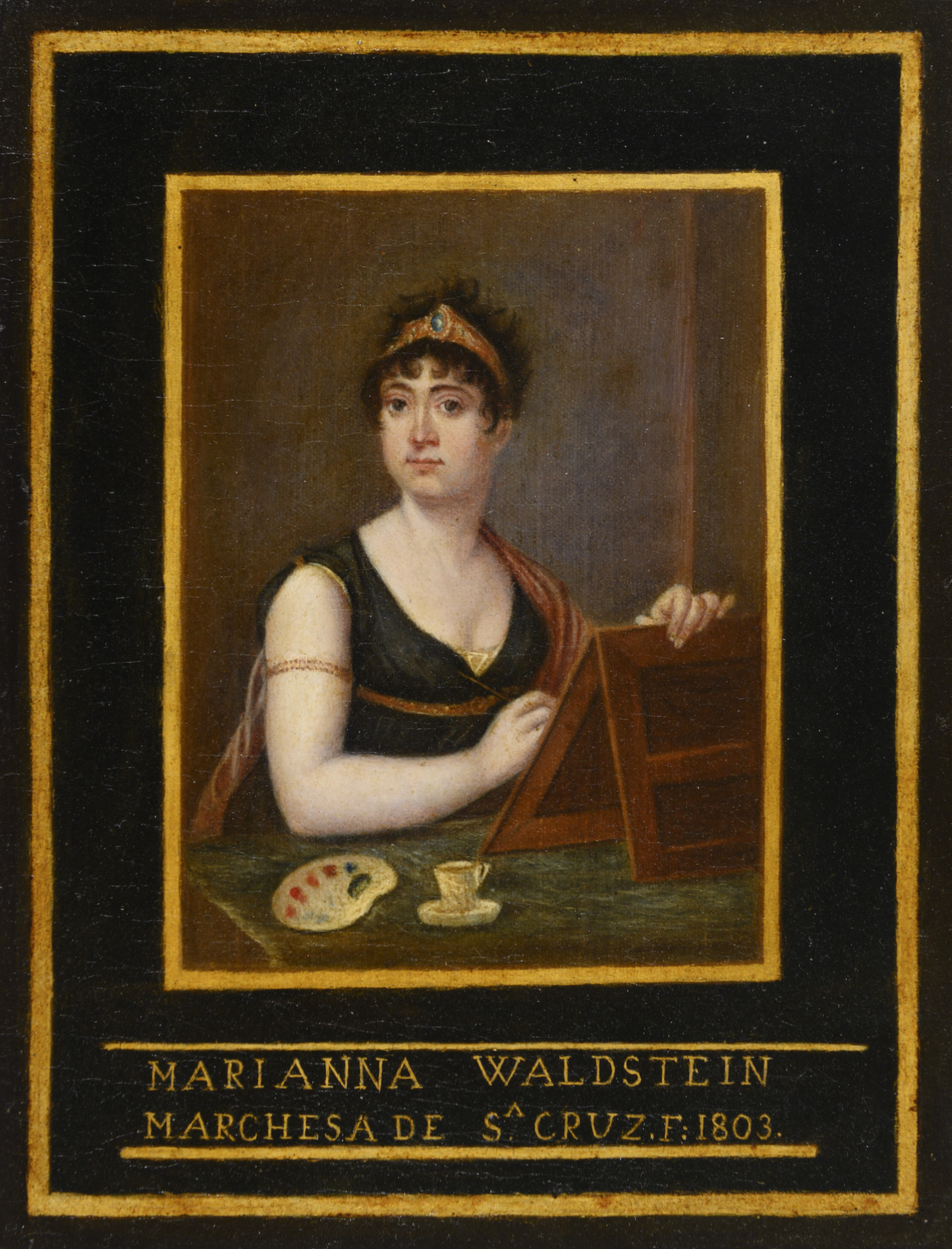
Portrait of Mariana Waldstein painting

Mariana Fernanda Waldstein or Marie-Anne Waldstein (Vienna, 30 May 1763 – Fano Italy, 21 June 1808), Marchioness of Santa Cruz, was an Austrian-Spanish aristocrat and painter.

== Biography ==
She was born on 30 May 1763 in Vienna, as daughter of Count Emanuel Philibert von Waldstein-Wartenberg (1731–1775) and sister of Count Ferdinand von Waldstein, early patron of Ludwig van Beethoven.

Aged 18, she married the 47-year-old widowed Spanish Marquis of Santa Cruz José Joaquín de Silva-Bazán. She followed her husband to Spain, where she began to cultivate painting under the direction of Isidro Carnicero. A portrait of her hand presented to the Real Academia de Bellas Artes de San Fernando led to her receiving the title of Honorary director and Academic of merit for painting. She went on to dedicate herself more to miniatures alongside the painters Dubois and Heltz from Saxony.

In 1797 or 1799, she was painted by Francisco Goya. The painting is now in the Louvre Museum.

She was rumoured to have had an affair with French Ambassador Ferdinand Guillemardet in 1798 and with his successor Lucien Bonaparte in 1800–1802.

In 1802, her husband died and she went to Italy, leaving her portrait made by her hand in the gallery of Florence. The academy of that city, and later that of San Lucas in Rome, named her an Academician of merit. In 1805 she returned to Spain, and resided there for a very short time before moving back to Italy. There she continued to paint and copy works by the great masters, such as Caravaggio, Titian and Il Garofalo. She died in Fano at the age of forty-five on 21 June 1808.

== Children ==
From her marriage with José Joaquín de Silva-Bazán, she had four children:

- José Gabriel de Silva-Bazán (1782–1839), 10th Marquis of Santa Cruz, Grandee of Spain
- Juan Manuel de Silva y Waldstein (1783)
- Marianna Teresa de Silva y Waldstein (1787–1805), married Bernardino Fernández de Velasco (1783–1851)
- Pedro de Silva y Waldstein (1789).

== Links ==
- The Louvre Museum
