= Piano Sonata No. 21 (Beethoven) =

Piano Sonata by Ludwig van Beethoven

- Waldstein
- by Ludwig van Beethoven
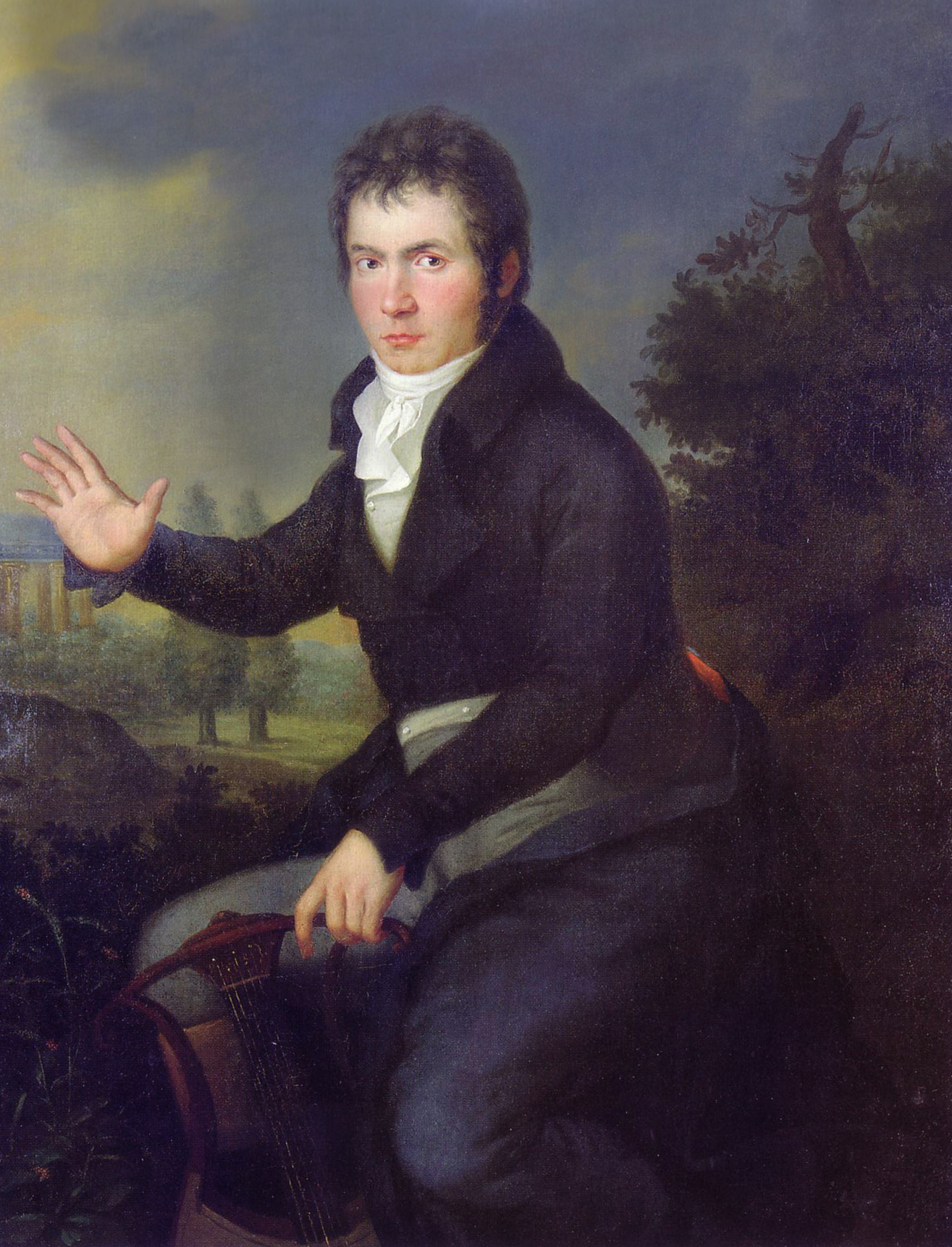
- Portrait of Ludwig van Beethoven (c. 1804–1805); painted by Joseph Willibrord Mähler (1778–1860)
- Key: C major
- Opus: 53
- Composed: 1804
- Dedication: Count Ferdinand Ernst Gabriel von Waldstein
- Duration: c. 25 minutes
- Movements: 3
- Scoring: Solo piano

Beethoven's Piano Sonata No. 21 in C major, Op. 53, known as the Waldstein, is one of the three most notable sonatas of his middle period (the other two being the Appassionata, Op. 57, and Les Adieux, Op. 81a). Completed in summer 1804 and surpassing Beethoven's previous piano sonatas in its scope, the Waldstein is a key early work of Beethoven's "Heroic" decade (1803–1812) and set a standard for piano composition in the grand manner.

The sonata's name derives from Beethoven's dedication to his close friend and patron Count Ferdinand Ernst Gabriel von Waldstein, member of Bohemian noble Waldstein family (Valdštejn). It is the only work that Beethoven dedicated to him. It is also known as L'Aurora (The Dawn) in Italian, for the sonority of the opening chords of the third movement, thought to conjure an image of daybreak.

It is considered one of Beethoven's greatest and most technically challenging piano sonatas. The first section of the rondo requires a simultaneous pedal trill, high melody and rapid left hand runs, and the coda features octave glissandi written in dialogue between the hands.

An average performance of the entire Waldstein lasts about twenty-five minutes.

== Movements ==
I. Allegro con brio

II. Introduzione: Adagio molto

III. Rondo. Allegretto moderato – Prestissimo
Played by Artur Schnabel in 1932

The Waldstein has three movements:

1. Allegro con brio,
2. Introduzione: Adagio molto in F major, 6/8
3. Rondo: Allegretto moderato — Prestissimo, 2/4

The first and last movements of the sonata are the most substantial, each taking about 11 minutes to perform. The second movement only lasts about 4 minutes in performance.

=== I. Allegro con brio ===
The first movement is in sonata form and common time: it has a repeated exposition with two subject groups, a development section, a recapitulation and a coda.

The movement opens with repeated pianissimo chords in a straightforward but anxious rhythm, devoid of melody for two bars:

It then swiftly ascends, followed by a three-note descent in the middle register and a four-note descent in the upper. This phrase is then repeated starting on B♭ major – a whole tone lower – a device Beethoven also used for the opening of the Sonata No. 16 in G Major (Op. 31 No. 1). After a half cadence to the dominant (G major), the opening phrase returns again but this time in a tremolo variation. The second subject group, marked dolce, is a chordal theme in E major, the mediant key. Modulation to the mediant for the second subject area is another feature shared by this sonata and the Sonata No. 16. Beethoven would employ the same shift again in later works (in the Hammerklavier Sonata, for example).

For the recapitulation, Beethoven transposes the second subject into A major, quickly changing into A minor and then back to C major for the coda.

=== II. Introduzione. Adagio molto ===
The Introduzione is a short Adagio in 6/8 time that serves as an introduction to the third movement. This replaced an earlier, longer middle movement, later published as the Andante favori, WoO 57. The music gradually gets more agitated before calming down to transition into the rondo third movement. Beethoven would later repeat this procedure in his later piano sonatas, notably the Appassionata and Les Adieux.

=== III. Rondo. Allegretto moderato – Prestissimo ===
The rondo begins with a pianissimo melody played with crossed hands that soon becomes fortissimo, over daringly fast scales in the left hand and a continuous trill on the dominant in the right, as described above. The second theme, a series of broken chords in triplets, is soon interrupted by a turbulent section in A minor that foreshadows the central episode.

The music returns to C major and the sweet theme is repeated, followed by a series of staccato octaves in C minor that mark the start of the central episode, one of the few cases where such a melodic change is seen, a tactic repeated in larger works like the Emperor Piano Concerto. Soon the octaves are accompanied by swirling triplets in the left and then the right hand. The music grows more tense and eventually reaches a cadence in C minor. The next section brings back the opening theme in chords and further develops it: it appears in A♭ major (bars 221–224), then F minor (225–228) and then D♭ major (229–232); it is fragmented into shorter phrases (233–238) and then transits into a quiet section with major 7th arpeggios, returning after much drama to the C major theme played fortissimo.

The second theme reappears, followed by another characteristic long line of dance-like music. Another series of fortissimo chords announces a short, delicate pianissimo section: the movement seems to die away but then unexpectedly segues into a virtuosic prestissimo coda that plays with the various themes of the movement, ending in a triumphant rush of grandeur.
