= José Gabriel de Silva-Bazán, 10th Marquis of Santa Cruz =

Spanish noble (1782–1839)

The Most Excellent José Gabriel de Silva-Bazán 10th Marquis of Santa Cruz GE
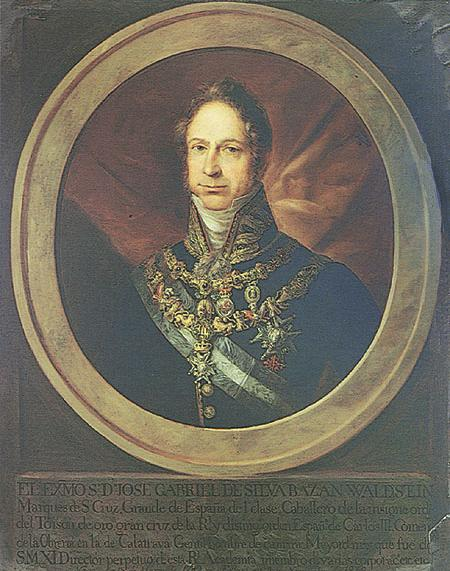

Prime Minister of Spain
- In office 24 January 1822 – 30 January 1822
- Monarch: Ferdinand VI
- Preceded by: Ramón López Pelegrín
- Succeeded by: Ramón López Pelegrín

Seat L of the Real Academia Española
- In office 24 August 1814 – 4 November 1839
- Preceded by: Vicente González Arnao
- Succeeded by: Bernardino Fernández de Velasco

Director of the Real Academia Española
- In office 24 August 1828 – 4 November 1839
- Preceded by: José Miguel de Carvajal-Vargas
- Succeeded by: Francisco Martínez de la Rosa

Personal details
- Born: José Gabriel de Silva-Bazán y Waldstein; 18 March 1782
- Died: 4 November 1839 (aged 57) Madrid, Spain

José Gabriel de Silva-Bazán y Waldstein, 10th Marquis of Santa Cruz de Mudela (18 March 1782 – 4 November 1839), was a Spanish noble, the first director of the Prado Museum, between 1817 and 1820, and Mayordomo mayor between 1822 and 1823.

== Biography ==
He was a descendant of Álvaro de Bazán, 1st Marquis of Santa Cruz, as eldest son of José Joaquín de Silva-Bazán (1734–1802), 9th Marquis of Santa Cruz and his second Austrian wife Mariana Waldstein (1763–1808).

He was a senator, a Knight in the Order of the Golden Fleece (1821), the Order of Calatrava and the Order of Carlos III. He was also Gentilhombre, Mayordomo mayor and Sumiller de Corps of Ferdinand VII, member of the Regency Council during the childhood of Isabella II of Spain, Ambassador in París, special envoy to London for the coronation of George IV, and director of the Real Academia Española. He was even Prime Minister of Spain for 6 days in January 1822.

In 1817, he became the first director of the Prado Museum. Before the Peninsular War, his father had already convinced King Charles IV not to burn the obscene paintings in the Royal collection, as was the wish of the previous king, Charles III, but to store them in a private gallery. After the War, under impulse of Queen Maria Isabel of Braganza, the museum was created with José Gabriel de Silva-Bazán as its first director.

He was replaced as director by his brother-in-law Pedro de Alcántara Téllez-Girón, after the outbreak of the Liberal Triennium, but in the uncertain times following the death of King Ferdinand VII of Spain, he collaborated with the new director José Rafael de Silva Fernández de Híjar to keep the museum's collection together.

== Marriage and children ==
He married in 1801 with Joaquina Téllez-Girón (1784–1851), daughter of Pedro Téllez-Girón, 9th Duke of Osuna and María Josefa Pimentel, 12th Countess-Duchess of Benavente and painted by Francisco Goya.
They had four children.

- Joaquina (1802–1876), married Pedro de Alcántara Álvarez de Toledo y Palafox, 17th Duke of Medina Sidonia (1803–1867)
- Inés (1806–1865), married Nicolás Osorio y Zayas, 16th Marquis of Alcañices and 15th Duke of Alburquerque (1799–1866)
- Fernanda María (1808–1879), married Andrés Avelino de Arteaga Lazcano y Carvajal, 6th Marquis of Valmediano (1807–1850),
- Francisco de Borja (1815–1889), 11th Marquis of Santa Cruz, with issue

=== Images by Francisco Goya ===
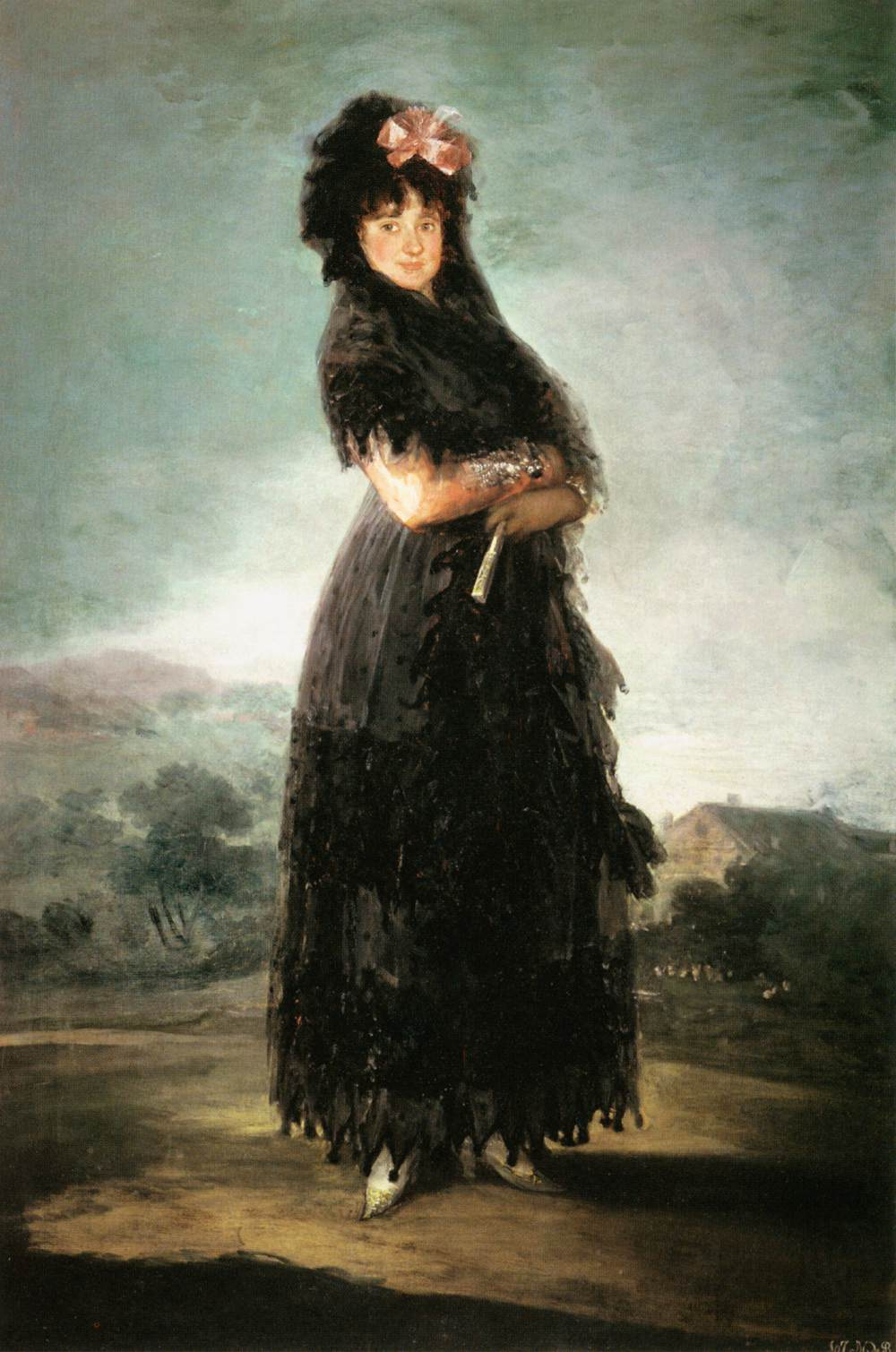
Mariana Waldstein, his mother (1797–1800)

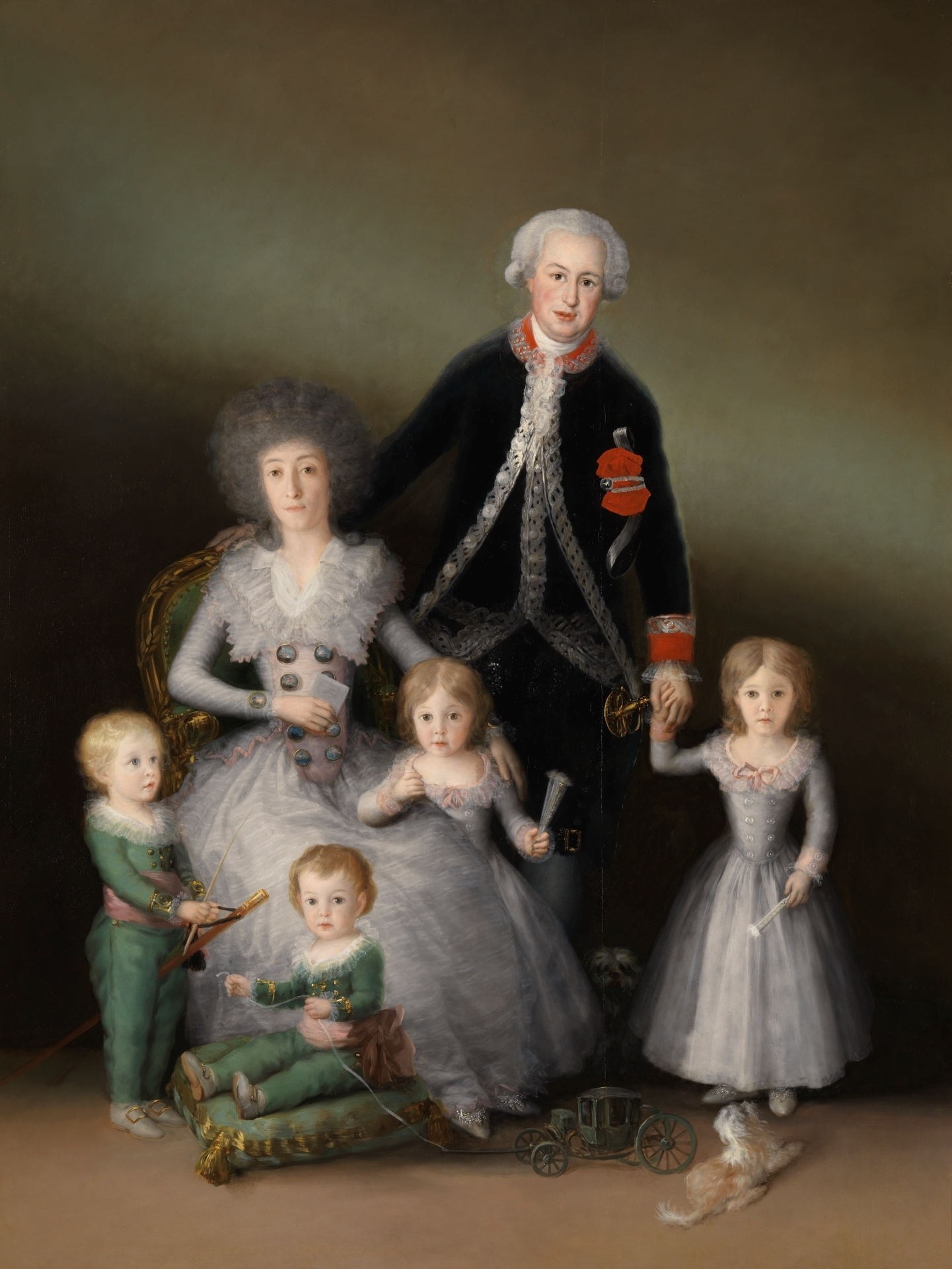
The Duke of Osuna and his young family, his parents-in-law (1788)

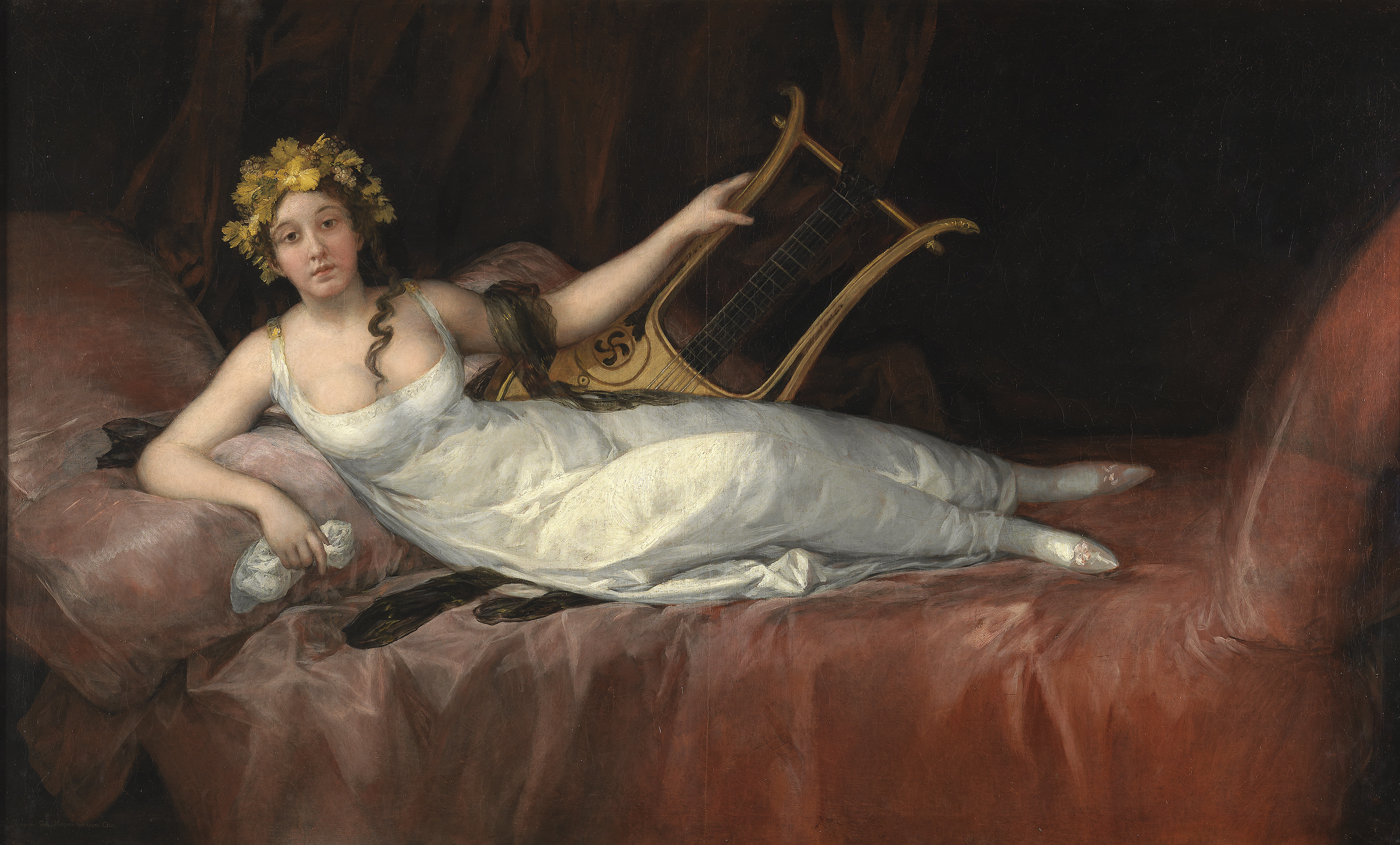
The Marchioness of Santa Cruz, his wife (1805)

== Sources ==
- Museo del Prado
- Medinaceli
