= Franz de Paula Adam von Waldstein =

Austrian botanist (1759–1823)

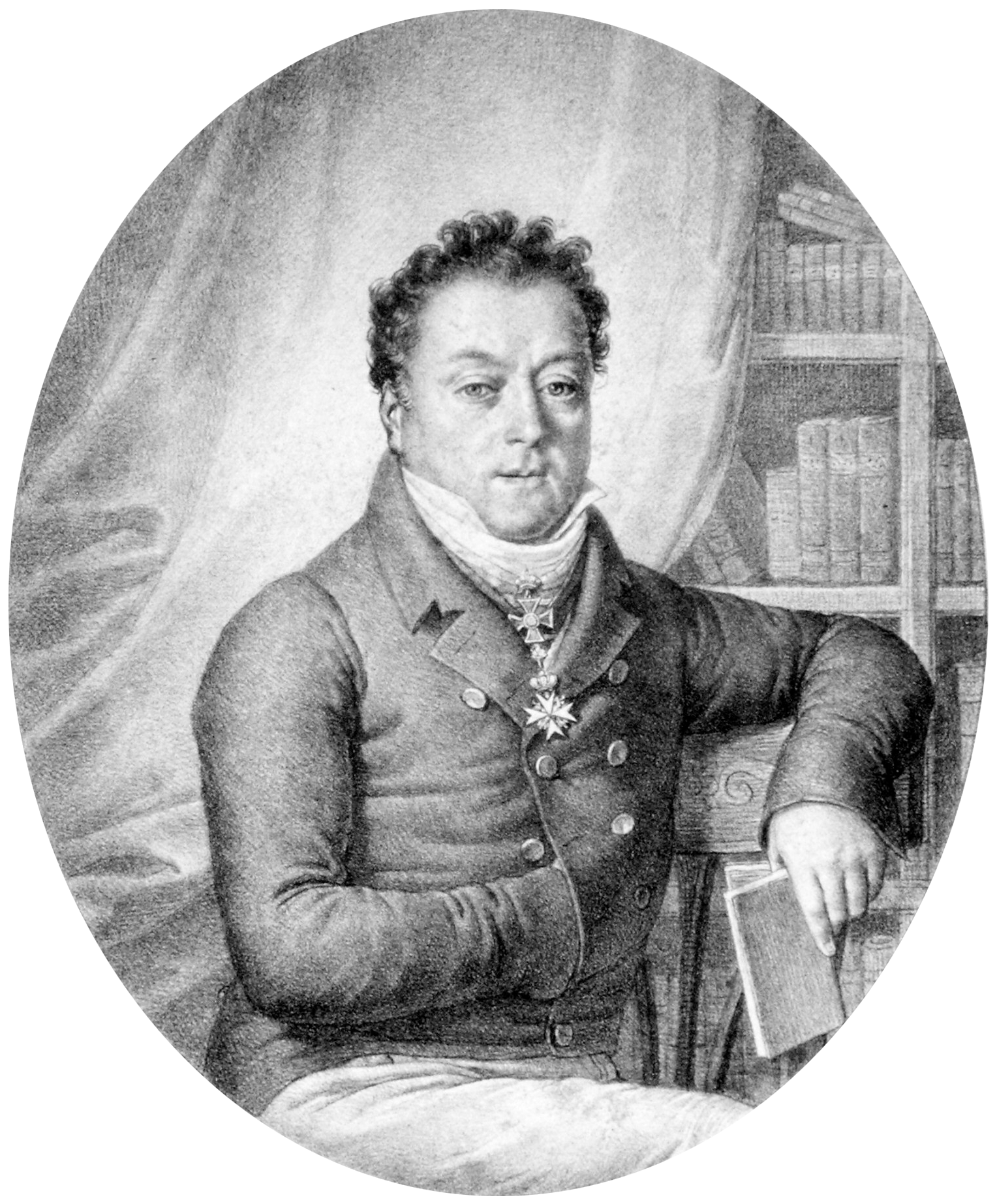
Count Franz Adam Waldstein, lithograph by Josef Lanzedelli (d. 1832)

Franz de Paula Adam Norbert Wenzel Ludwig Valentin von Waldstein (14 February 1759 – 24 May 1823) was an Austrian soldier, explorer and naturalist.

== Biography ==
A member of an old noble House of Waldstein, he was born in Vienna, the third son of Count Emanuel Philibert von Waldstein-Wartenberg (1731–1775) and his wife, Princess Maria Anna Theresia von Liechtenstein (1738-1814). His younger brother Count Ferdinand Ernst Gabriel von Waldstein (1762–1823) became known as patron of Ludwig van Beethoven.

Waldstein married Karolina Ferdinandi (1777–1844). As a soldier he took part in Habsburg campaigns against the Ottoman Empire and Russia.

From 1789, he studied the botany of Hungary with Pál Kitaibel. His herbarium is archived in Prague. Together with Kitaibel he wrote Descriptiones et icones plantarum rariorum Hungariae ("descriptions and pictures of the rare plants of Hungary"; M. A. Schmidt, Vienna, three volumes, 1802–1812).

In 1814, Waldstein was appointed member of the Bavarian Academy of Sciences and Humanities. He died at his manor in Litvínov (German: Oberleutensdorf), Bohemia. The genus Waldsteinia (Rosaceae) was named after him by Carl Ludwig von Willdenow, as well as a Campanula (bellflower) species (Campanula waldsteiniana) by Josef August Schultes.
