= Count Ferdinand Ernst Gabriel von Waldstein =

German nobleman (1762–1823)

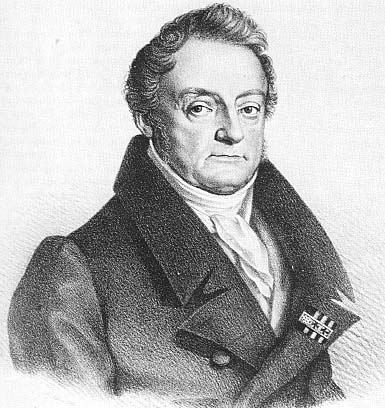
Count von Waldstein, about 1800

Count Ferdinand Ernst Joseph Gabriel von Waldstein und Wartenberg (24 March 1762 – 26 May 1823) was a Czech and German nobleman and patron of the arts. A member of the Bohemian House of Waldstein (Valdštejn) and an early patron of Ludwig van Beethoven, his political and military roles included the office of a Geheimrat in Bonn, commander (Komtur) of the Teutonic Order, and (briefly) colonel of a light infantry regiment that he had raised. One of Beethoven's piano sonatas is named after him.

== Life ==
Waldstein was born in Vienna, Austria, the son of Count Emanuel Philibert von Waldstein-Wartenberg (1731–1775) and his wife, Princess Maria Anna Theresa of Liechtenstein (1738-1814). One of 11 children, his older brothers included Franz de Paula Adam von Waldstein and Josef Karl von Waldstein (1755-1814), who was an enthusiast of Kabbalah and employer of Giacomo Casanova. His sister Marie-Anne Waldstein (1763-1808) became a famous painter in Spain.

In 1787 he joined the Teutonic Knights and became a novice in Ellingen. Living in Bonn from early 1788 onwards, Waldstein received, on 17 June that year, the knighthood of the Order by its Grand Master Archduke Maximilian Francis of Austria, the Elector of Cologne. He was admitted to electoral court in Bonn and one year later became Geheimrat ("privy councillor") of the Order and a member of its Staatskonferenz . As a gift of Maximilian Francis, he received a knightly estate in Godesberg and became, after submitting his quarters of nobility, a member of the Cologne Landstände in 1793.

From 1788 to 1792, Ferdinand was sent on various diplomatic missions. In 1792, he received the Komtur office of the Order at Virnsberg Castle in Franconia. By early 1794, he was in the entourage of Elector Maximilian Francis, who had fled to Vienna from the invading French forces during the War of the First Coalition.

He became obsessed with the idea of defeating the French, broke up with the Elector and squandered all his money raising an army. On 3 June 1795, Ferdinand sealed a contract with Britain on creating a "Mergentheim Regiment". Recruited mainly in the principality of Waldeck and Pyrmont, his regiment arrived in the Isle of Wight, England in 1796. "Waldstein's Light Infantry" was well below its target strength of 1,200 men. While Adjutant Schmitt returned to Germany to continue recruiting, about 800 were sent to the West Indies in 1797. Many died of fever, and at the end of the year or early in 1798 the remaining enlisted men were drafted into the British 60th Regiment of Foot. (Note: Wallace gives the date of draft into the 60th as 30 Dec 1797, Chartrand gives it as 1.4.1798 [sic]. Commissioning of the officers began in January.) Many of the officers were offered and accepted British Army commissions. Waldstein was not among them, and it appears that his brief military career ended when his unit was dissolved. (Note: Statements that Waldstein held various general ranks in the British Army have been much copied and mis-copied, one even claiming that he was a field marshal. (By 1806, the UK had only three field marshals -- two of the king's sons and the elderly Marquess Townsend. Even the future Duke of Wellington would not get there for some years more.) Official records indicate that Waldstein was never an officer in the British Army at all, of any rank, nor is there evidence of military experience or achievement that would have gained him a general rank had he continued his military pursuits. Under British Army practice at that time, an officer who was colonel of a regiment only by virtue of having raised it, not having progressed through the lower officer ranks, had only temporary rank, was ineligible for promotion, and could not serve at that rank outside his own regiment. Waldstein's was a foreign regiment, now-disbanded. If Waldstein had joined the British army, he would have had to join as a junior officer, and foreign officers were prohibited by statute from rising above the rank of lieutenant-colonel.)

Waldstein's Light Infantry never saw action, but it did help the local militia to put out a fire in a biscuit bakery on the Isle of Wight.

For the next few years, Waldstein spent much of his time in London, although he returned to Germany from time to time. On 23 July 1797, Maximilian Francis wrote, "For over a year neither the order nor his creditors have heard anything from Ferdinand von Waldstein, I wish him much money and intelligence". While in London, he took part in amateur theatricals (for select invited audiences), and is reported to have given creditable performances.

From 1809, Ferdinand lived in Vienna or on his Bohemian estates. He withdrew from the Order in 1811. On 9 May 1812, Ferdinand married the wealthy Countess Isabella Rzewuska and organised numerous festivities on the sidelines of the Vienna Congress. After several unfortunate financial transactions, however, he became impoverished, and died in 1823 in Vienna.

== Patron ==
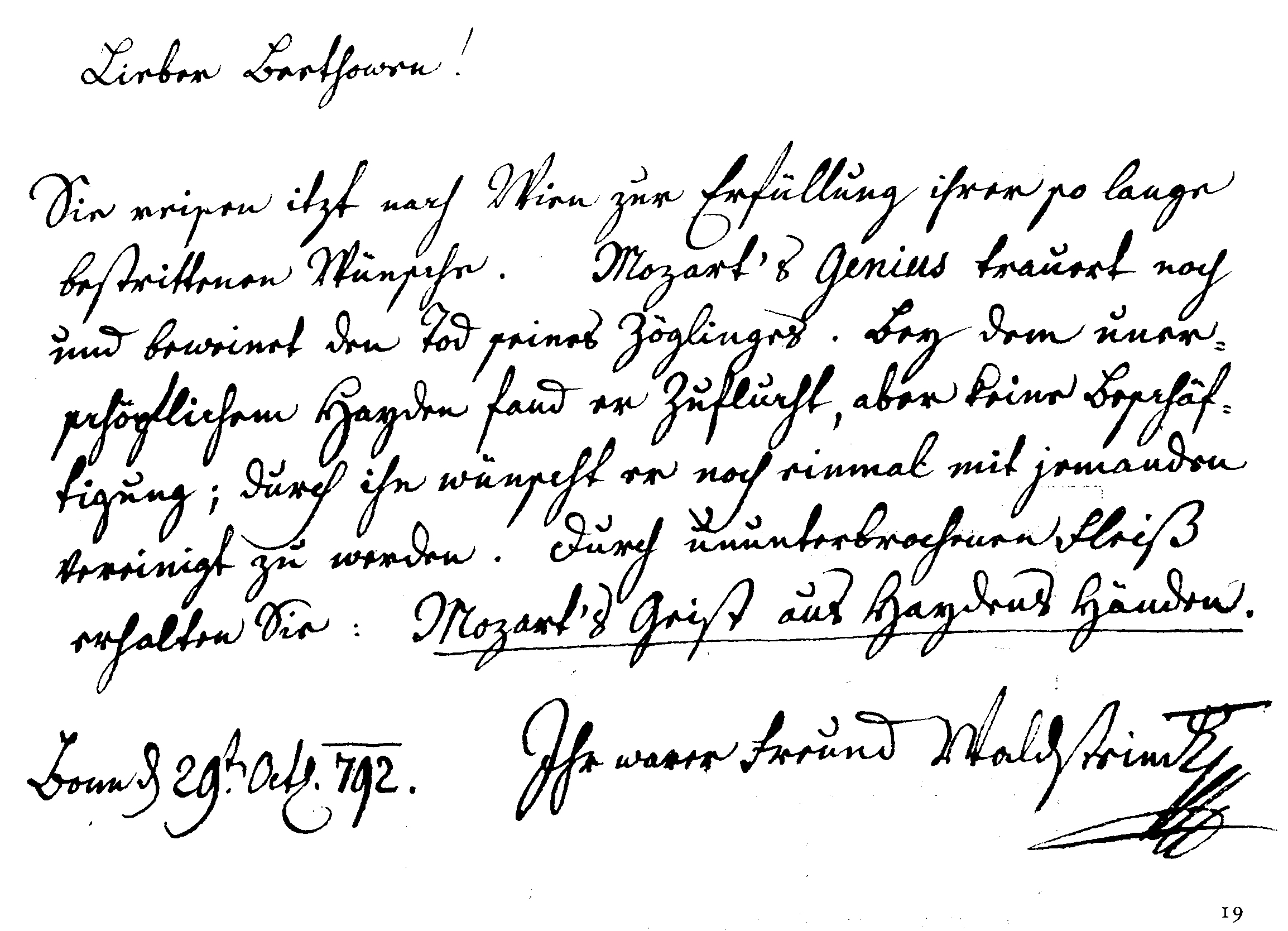
Waldstein's entry in Beethoven's friendship book

Waldstein, a fairly good pianist and composer, took an active part in the public life of Bonn. In the literary circles of professor Eulogius Schneider he noticed the young Ludwig van Beethoven around 1790 and he became one of his early patrons. Beethoven's Ritterballet, WoO 1, first performed on 6 March 1791, was attributed to Waldstein until it was discovered later that Beethoven had ghost-written it for his patron. In 1791/92 Beethoven finished a score entitled Eight variations for piano four hands on a theme by Count Waldstein.

It was Waldstein who recommended young Beethoven to Joseph Haydn and arranged a scholarship for him. His entry in Beethoven's friendship book on the composer's departure for Vienna in November 1792 remains famous:

Dear Beethoven! You go to realise a long-desired wish: the genius of Mozart is still in mourning and weeps for the death of its disciple. (...) By incessant application, receive Mozart's spirit from Haydn's hands.

In 1804 Beethoven dedicated his Sonata No. 21 in C major, Op. 53, known as the Waldstein, to him. However, it seems that both men hardly had contact with one another at that time. Beethoven dedicated no other work to Waldstein.
