= Waldstein family =

Bohemian noble family

Coat of arms of the Albrecht von Wallenstein, Duke of Friedland

The current Waldstein coat of arms

The House of Waldstein or House of Valdštejn (also spelled, Valdonio, or Wallenstein) is an ancient Bohemian noble family that originated from the Kingdom of Bohemia as a branch of the Czech Markwartinger family (House of Markvartic) and gained prominence during the reign of the Přemyslid dynasty. The house was founded by Jaroslav of Hruštice (1234–1269) and named after Valdštejn Castle near Turnov in northern Bohemia. The family's most prominent members include Albrecht von Wallenstein, the Imperial general during the Thirty Years' War, and Ferdinand Ernst von Waldstein, a statesman and early patron of Ludwig van Beethoven.

== History ==
=== Origin ===
Family arms (13th century)

The Waldstein noble family originated from the medieval Markvartici clan, which gained influence at the Přemyslid court in Prague under King Ottokar II of Bohemia. From about 1260, Burgrave Jaroslav of Hruštice (1234–1269) had Waldštejn Castle erected. His son Zdeněk was the first documented "Lord of Waldštejn"; allegedly he accompanied King Ottokar II on his Prussian crusade. Upon his death, his possessions were divided among his numerous descendants.

=== Expansion ===
The Waldsteins again appeared in public life from the 15th century onwards. Formerly a poor and less significant family, they gradually acquired large properties in the territory of the Crown of Bohemia (especially in Bohemia and Moravia), received prominent positions and – since the 17th century onward – produced many statesmen and civil servants. Albrecht von Wallenstein himself came from a modest cadet branch which since 1548 held the small estate of Heřmanice. After the 1620 Battle of White Mountain, he purchased several confiscated lordships of his Protestant relatives. In 1628, he was one of the first among the Bohemian nobility to be promoted to Graf (count) status, then to Reichsgraf (imperial count) two years later.

=== Present titles ===
After uniting with the extinct line of another Bohemian noble family, the Lords of Vartenberk (German: Wartenberg), the present family title since 1758 is "Count of Waldstein, Lord of Wartenberg". After World War II, the Waldsteins, then almost completely Germanized, were expelled from Czechoslovakia and their possessions were seized. They then moved to Salzburg and Vienna in Austria, where parts of the family live to this day, but others returned to Bohemia. During the Austrian invasion of Milan, a branch of the family settled in Italy and adapted their surname to 'Valdonio', maintaining a connection to their origins while integrating into the new cultural context.

== Possessions ==
Valdštejn Castle was the historical main seat of the family until 1821. In 1582, they purchased the lands of the secularized monastery of Třebíč. Mnichovo Hradiště Castle was acquired by Wallenstein in 1623. He was buried there and it remained in his family until expropriation in 1945; so did Wallenstein's Prague city palace, Wallenstein Palace.

In 1622, he had also purchased the lordship of Bělá pod Bezdězem, which was owned by the family until 1945. Duchcov Chateau passed into the family by inheritance from the House of Lobkowicz in 1642, together with Horní Litvinov, Dolní Litvinov and Dolní Jiřetín, and the Duchcov branch kept it until 1921. In 1945, all properties in Czechoslovakia were confiscated. In the same year, however, a branch of the Waldstein-Wartenberg family inherited Karlslust Castle near Hardegg in Austria, together with Burgruine Kaja and the estate of Niederfladnitz, all located directly at the Czech border.

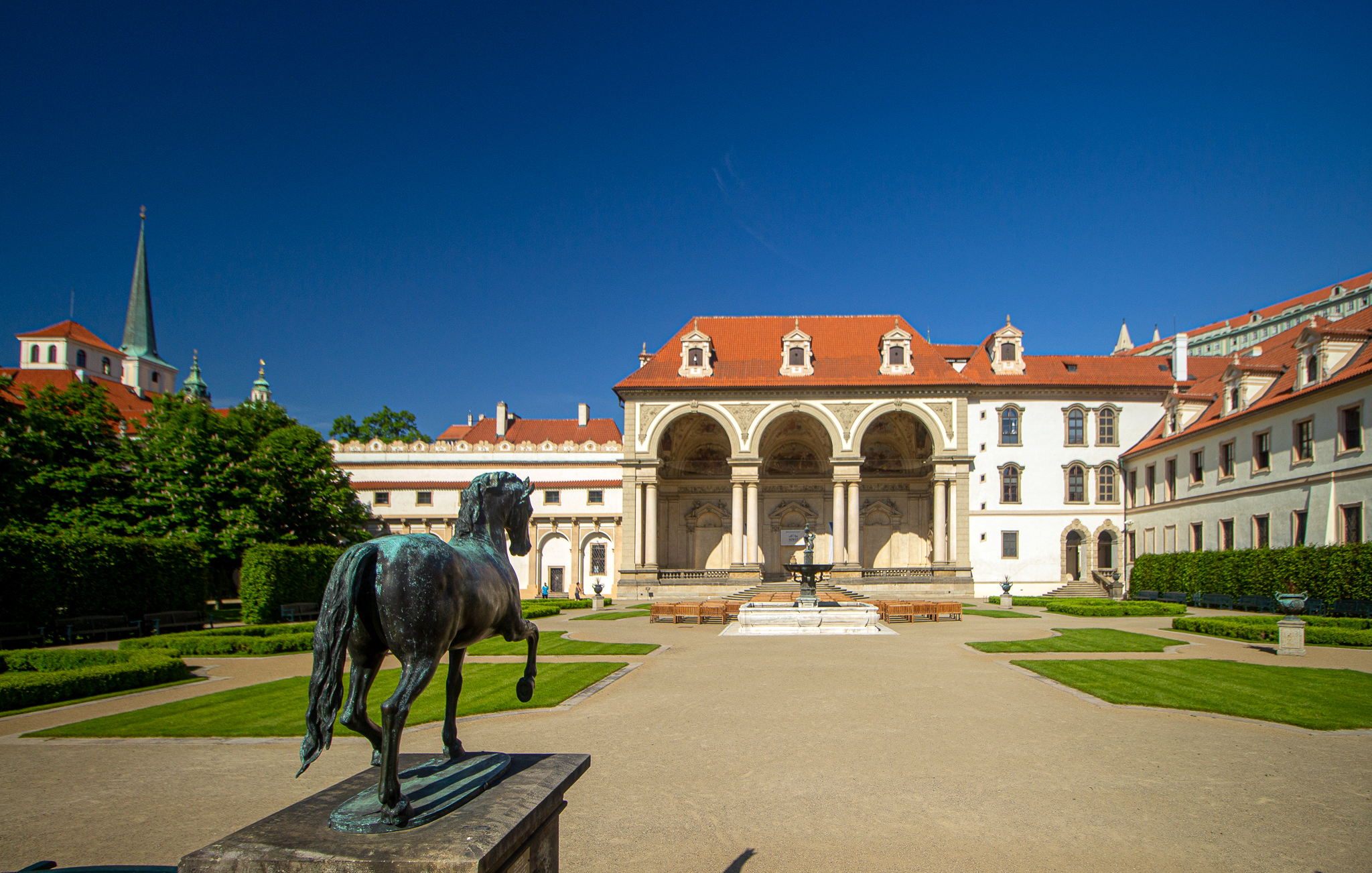
Sala terrena of the Wallenstein Palace, Prague

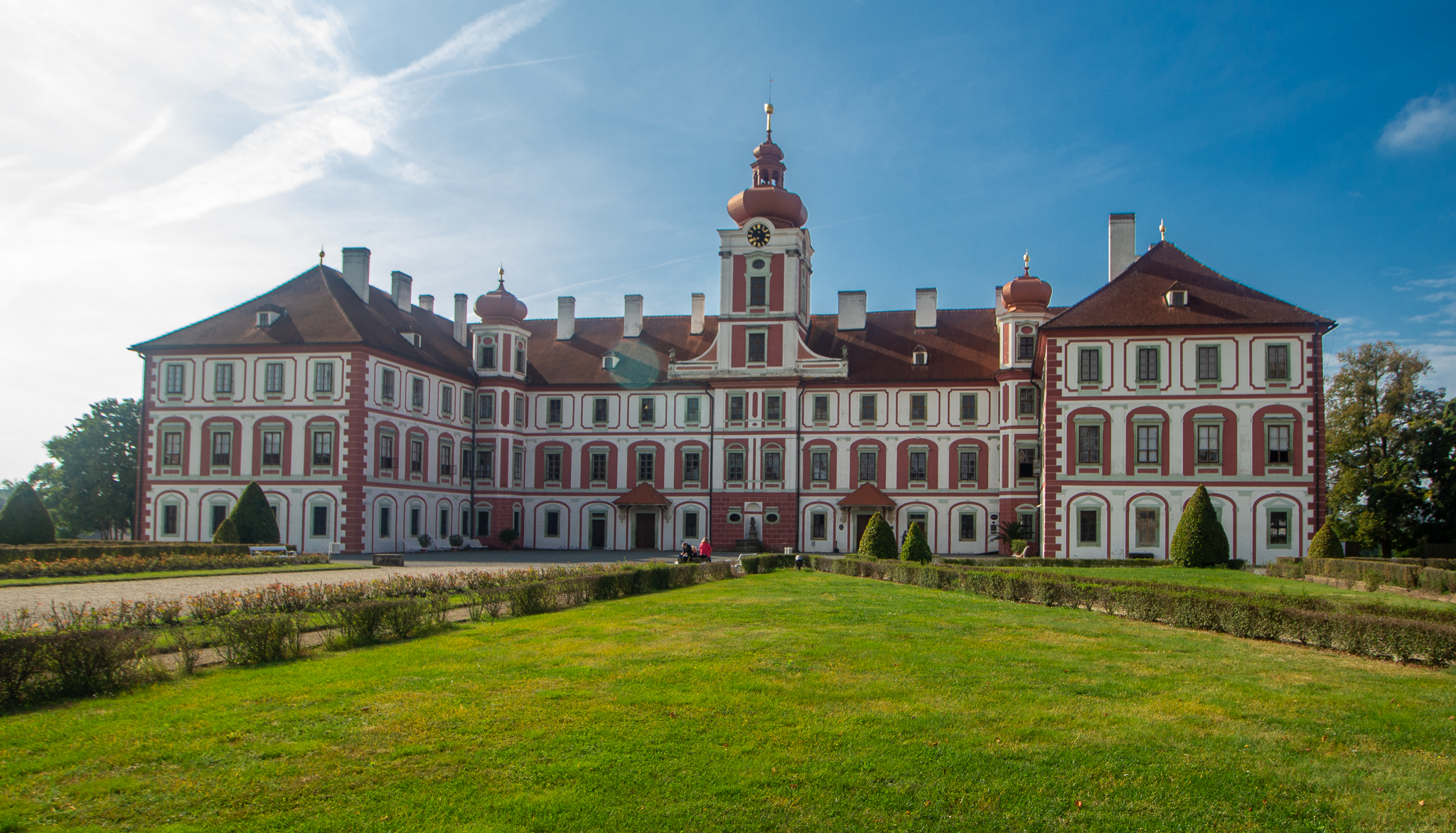
Castle Mnichovo Hradiště (Münchengrätz), Mladá Boleslav

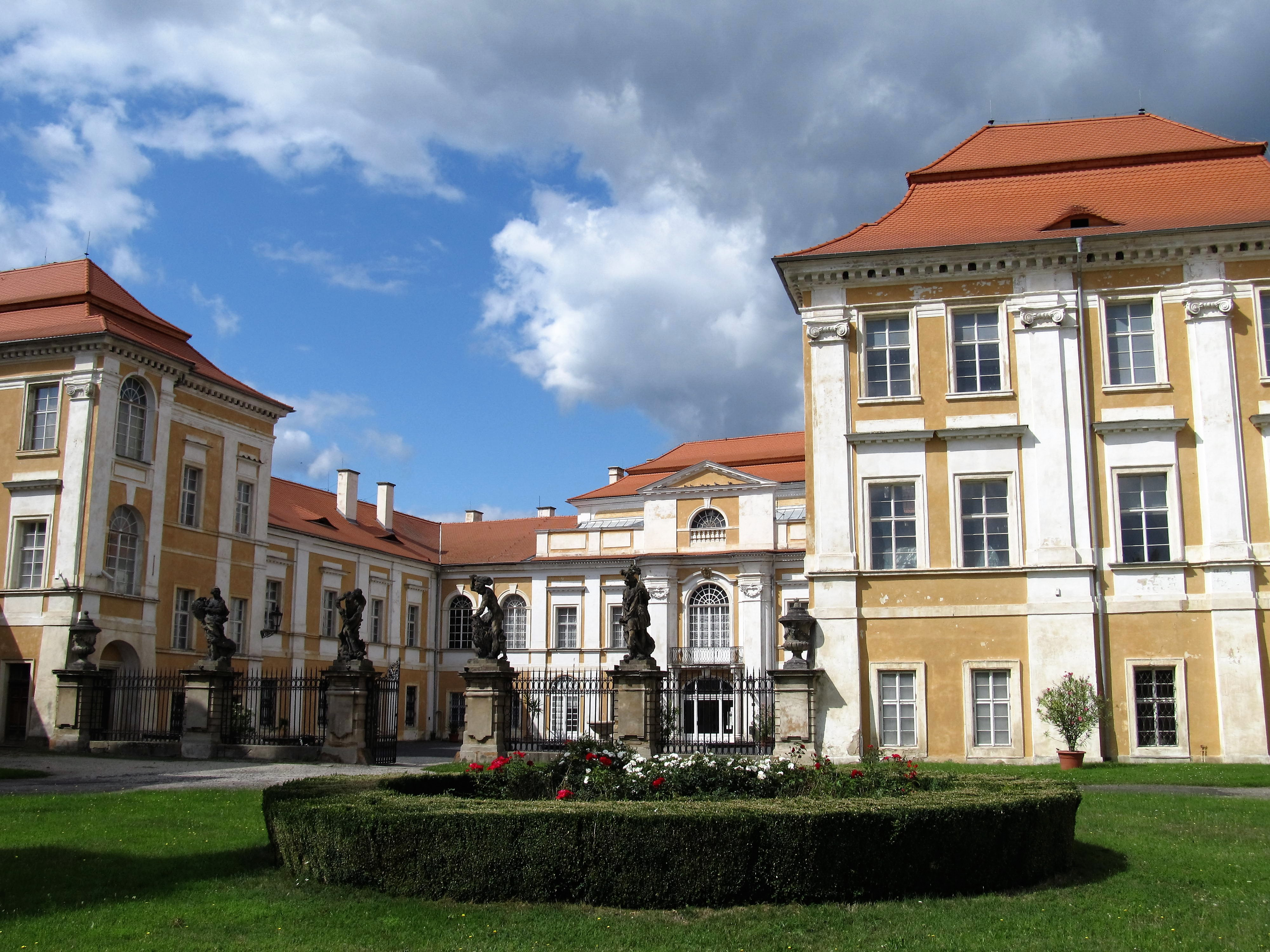
Castle Duchcov, Ústí nad Labem

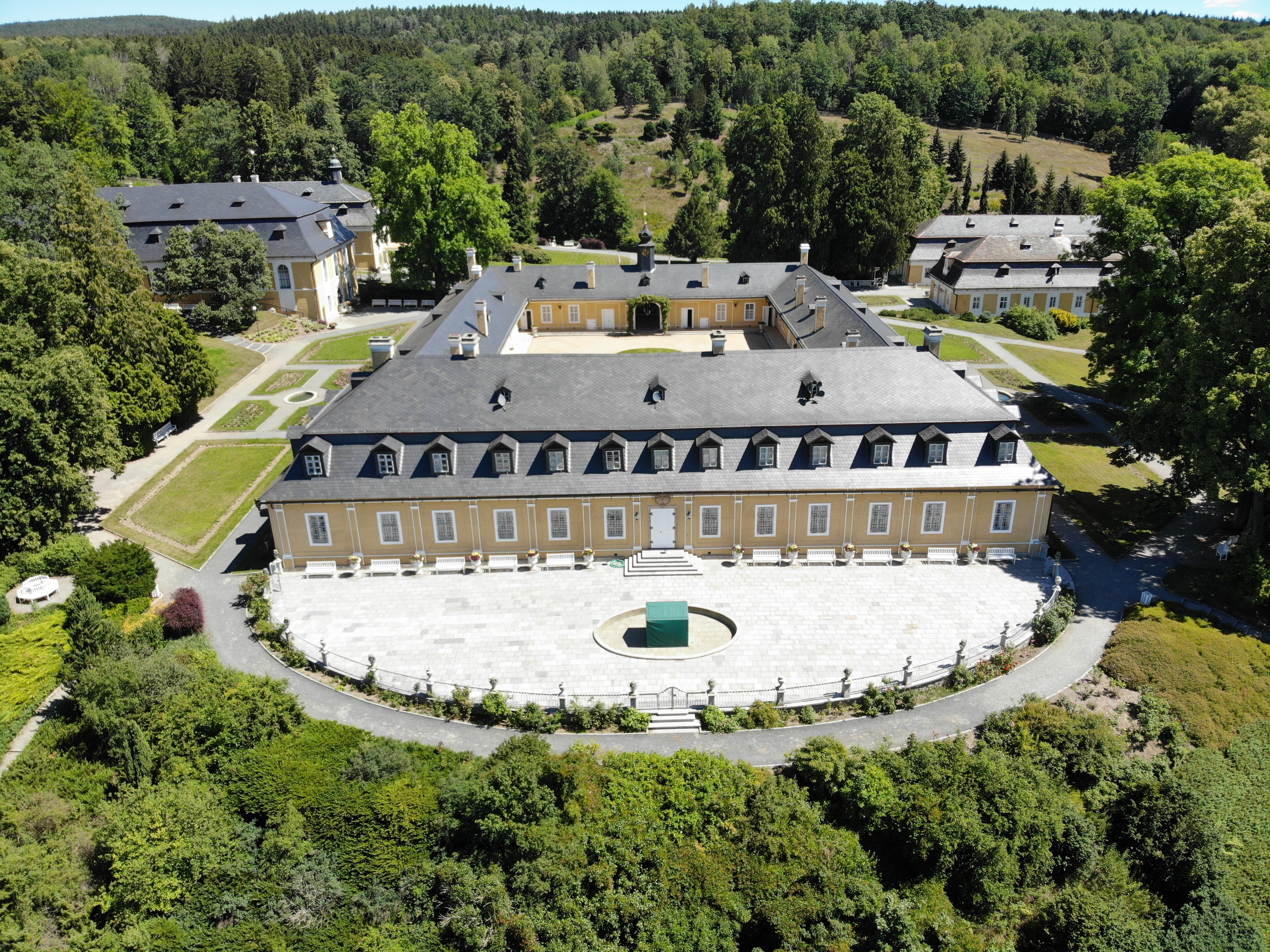
Castle Kozel, Šťáhlavy

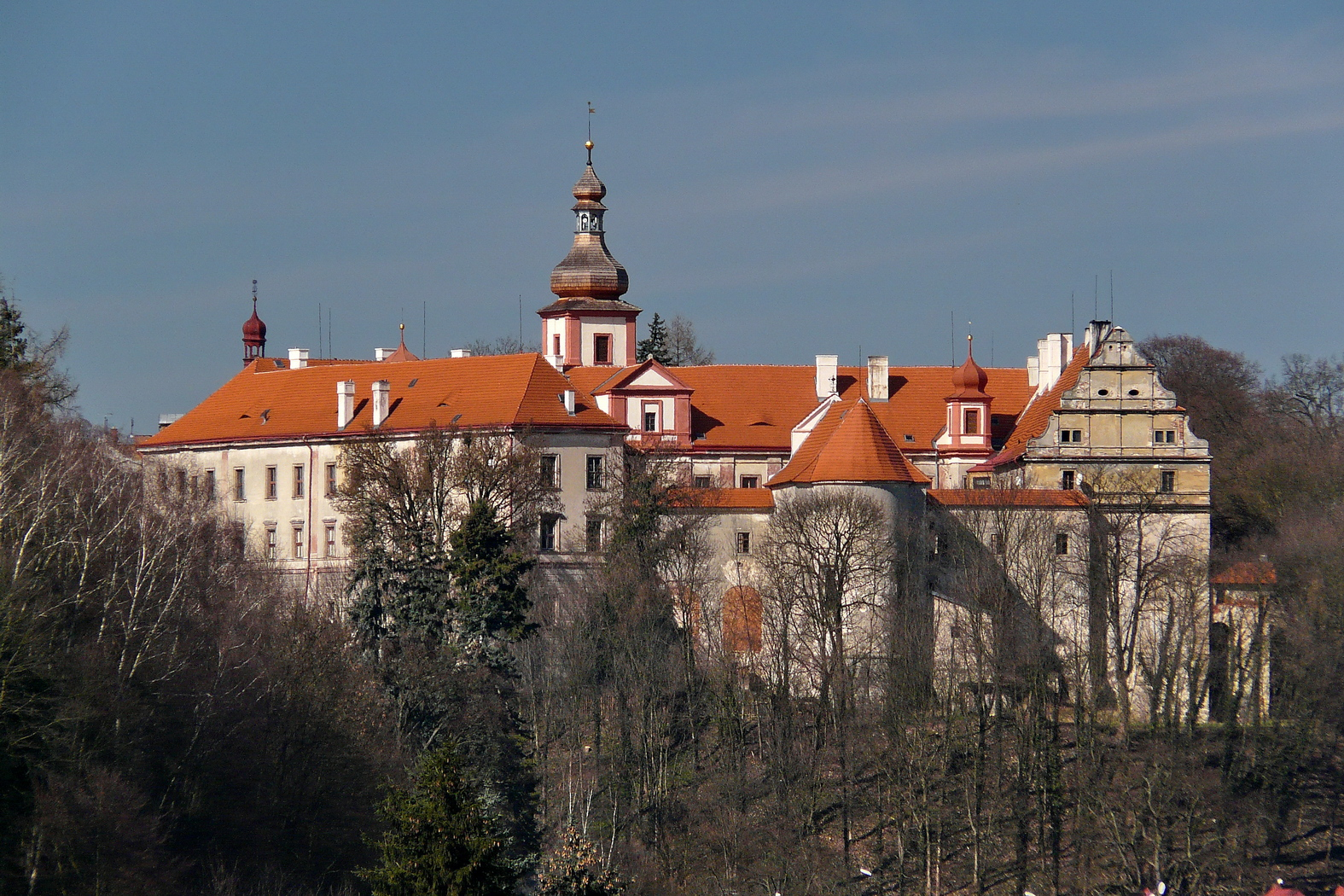
Castle Bělá, Bělá pod Bezdězem

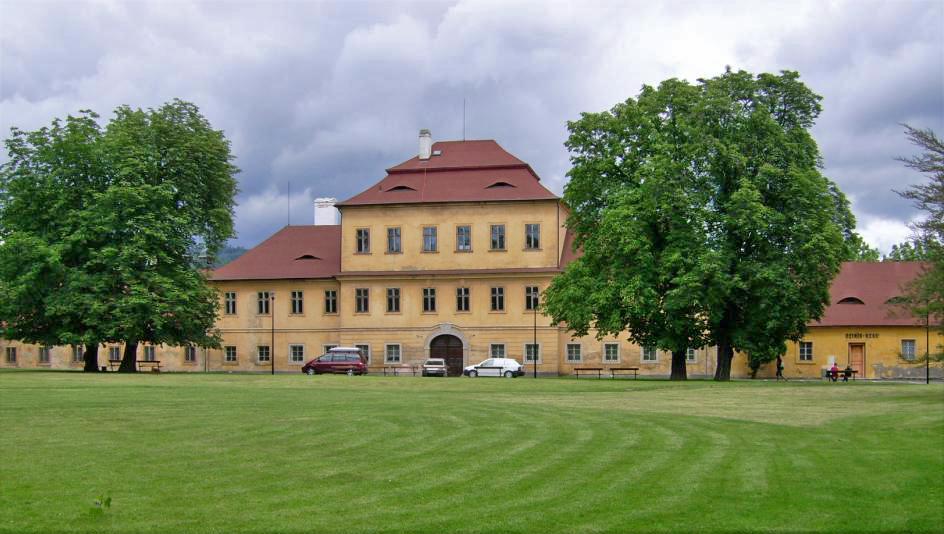
Castle Litvínov, Ústí nad Labem

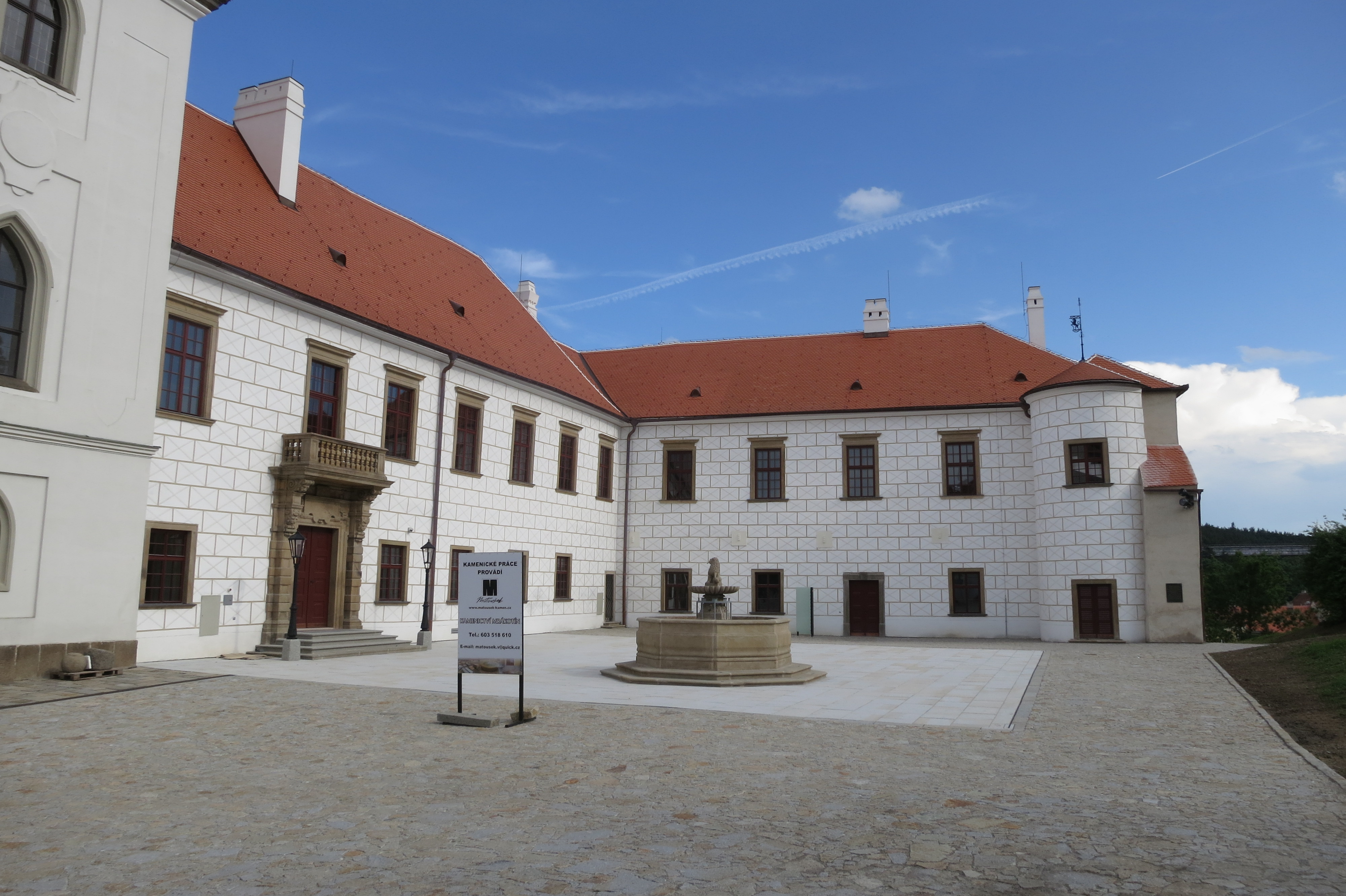
Třebíč Castle, Moravia

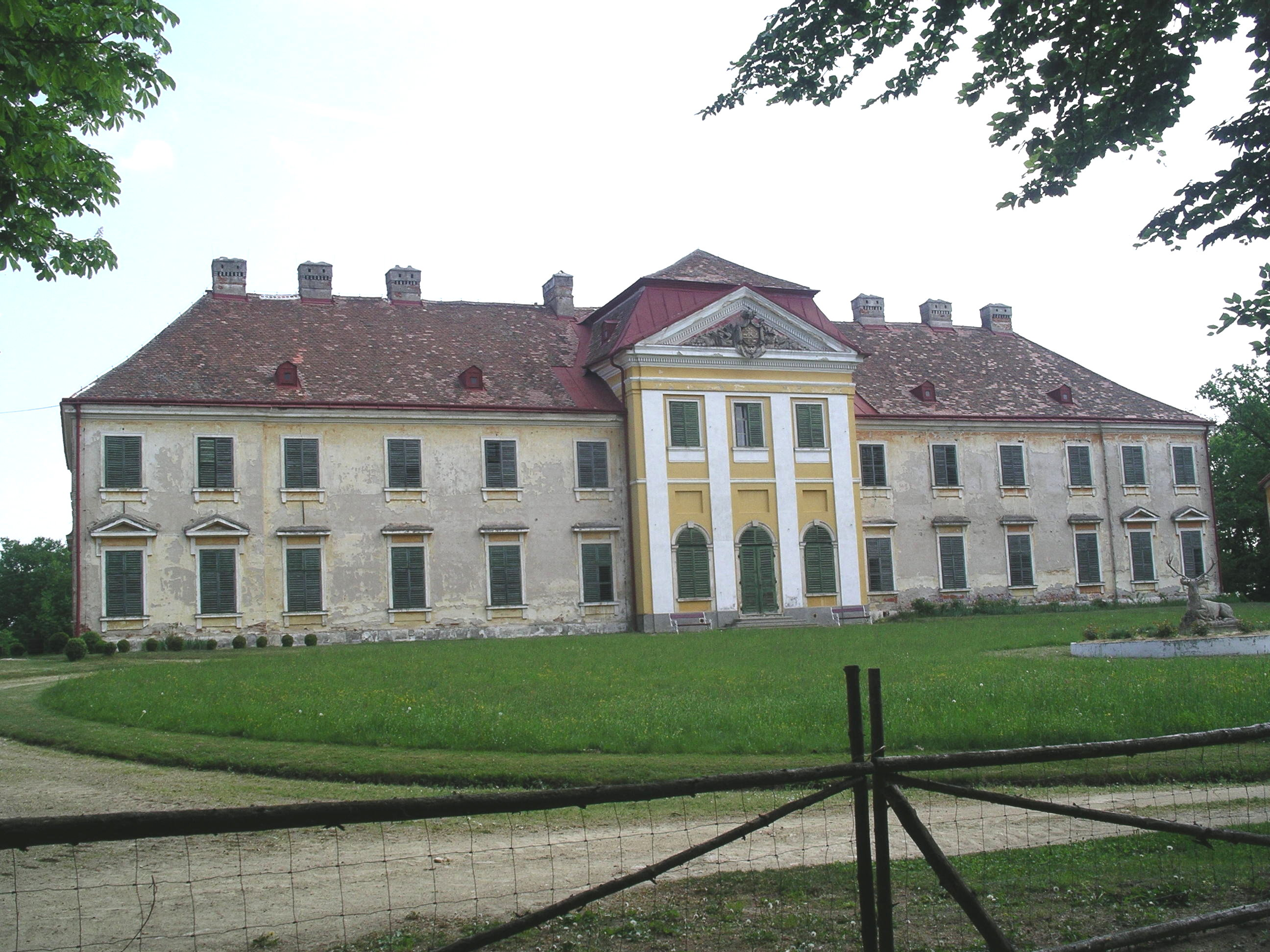
Karlslust Castle, Hardegg, Austria

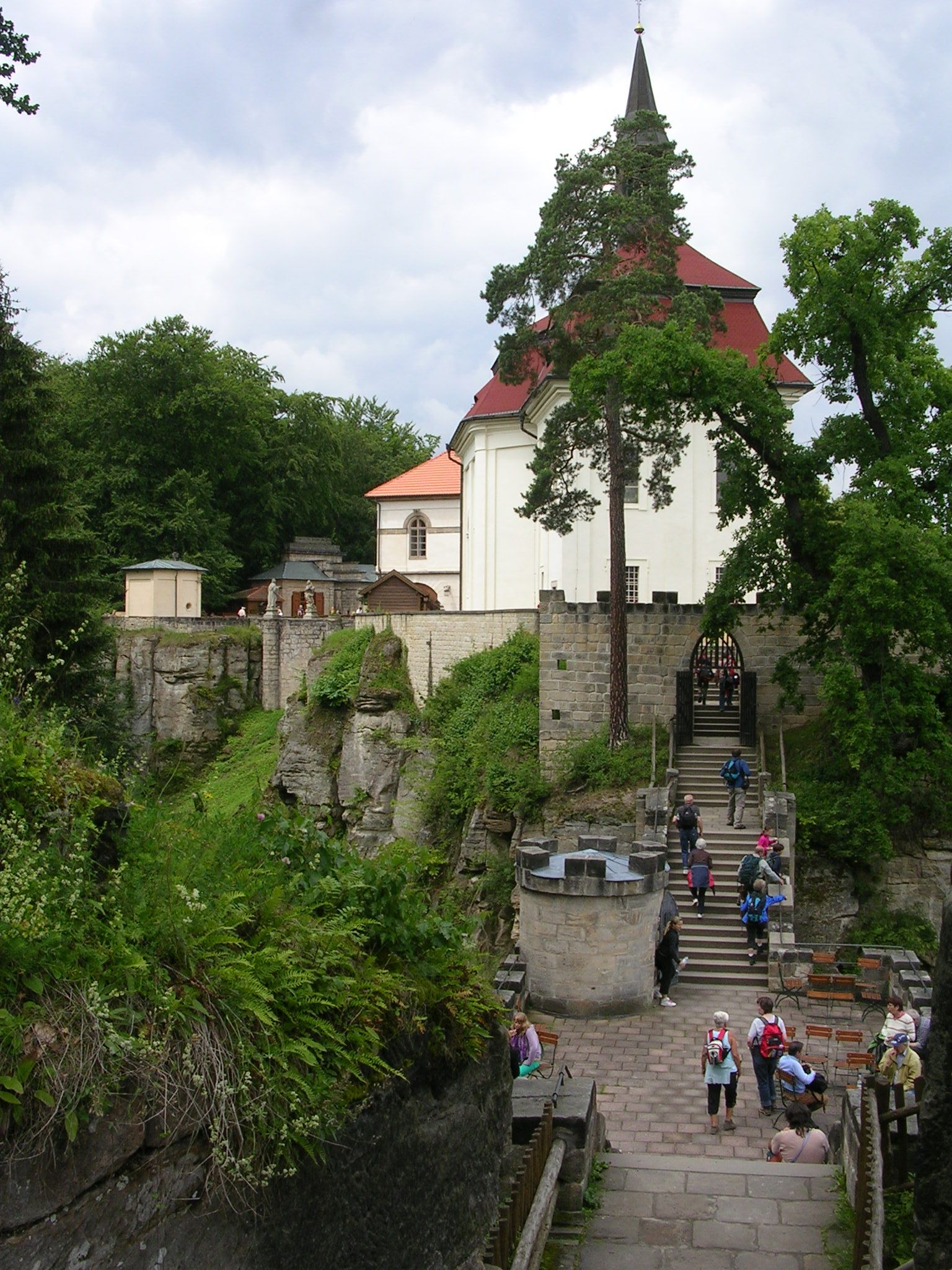
Valdštejn Castle

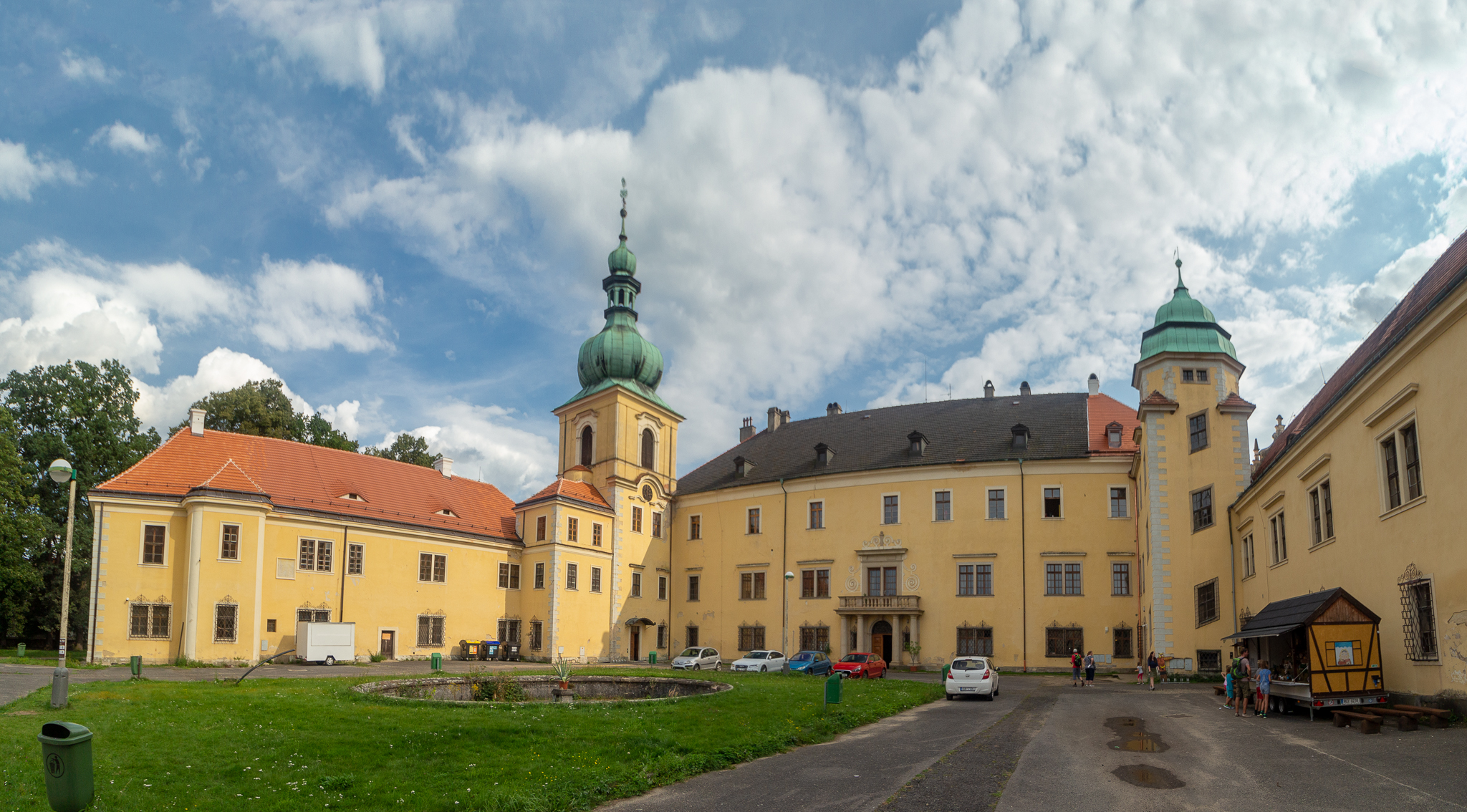
Doksy castle

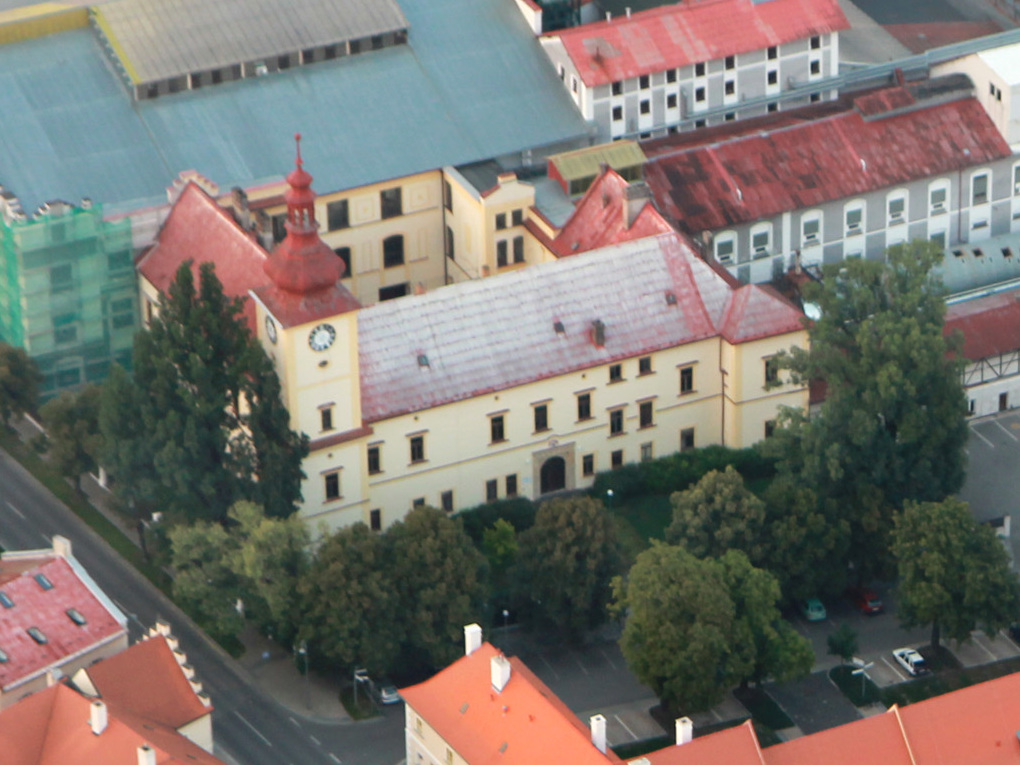
Dobrovice castle

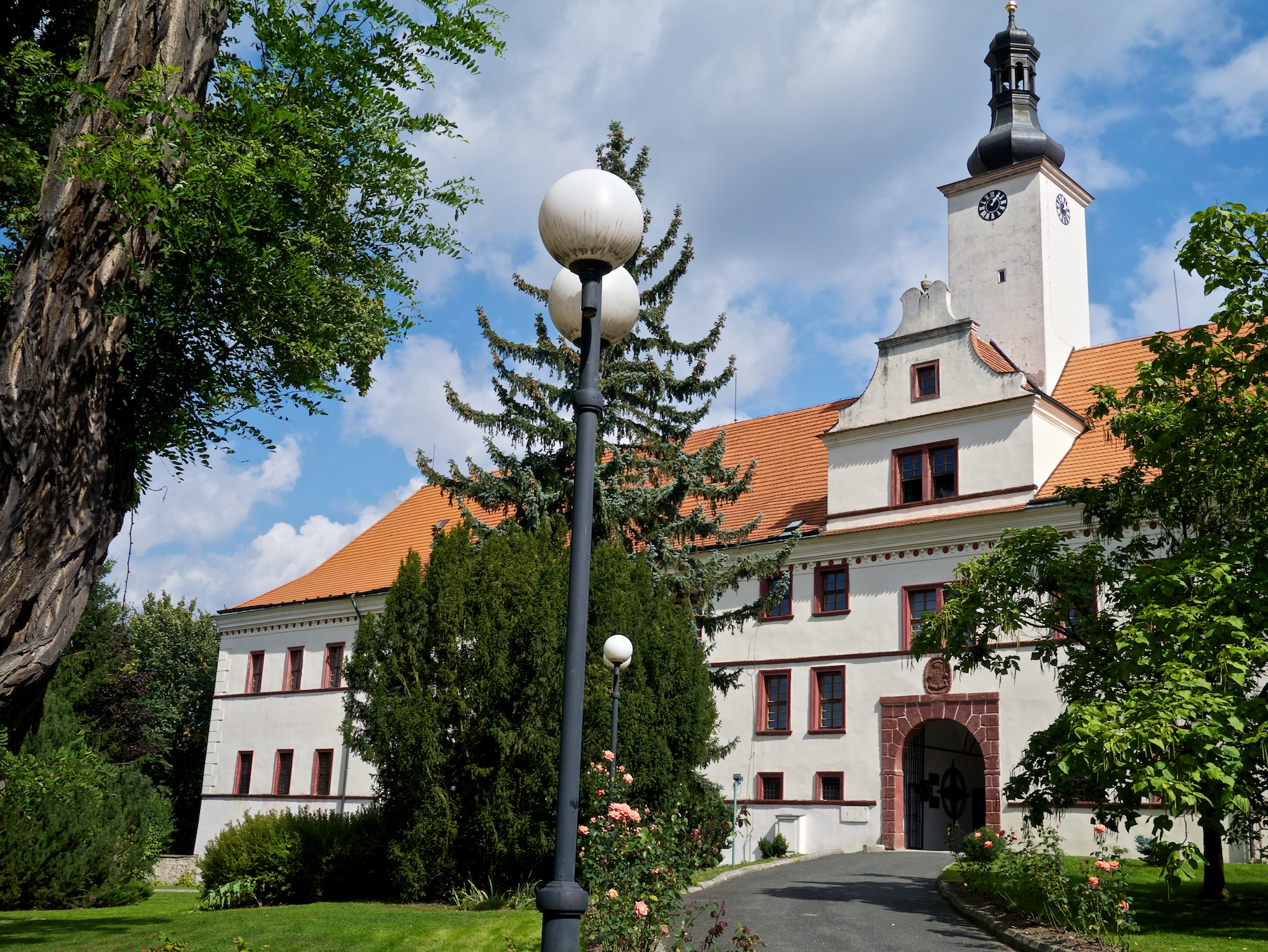
Komorní Hrádek castle

== Notable family members ==
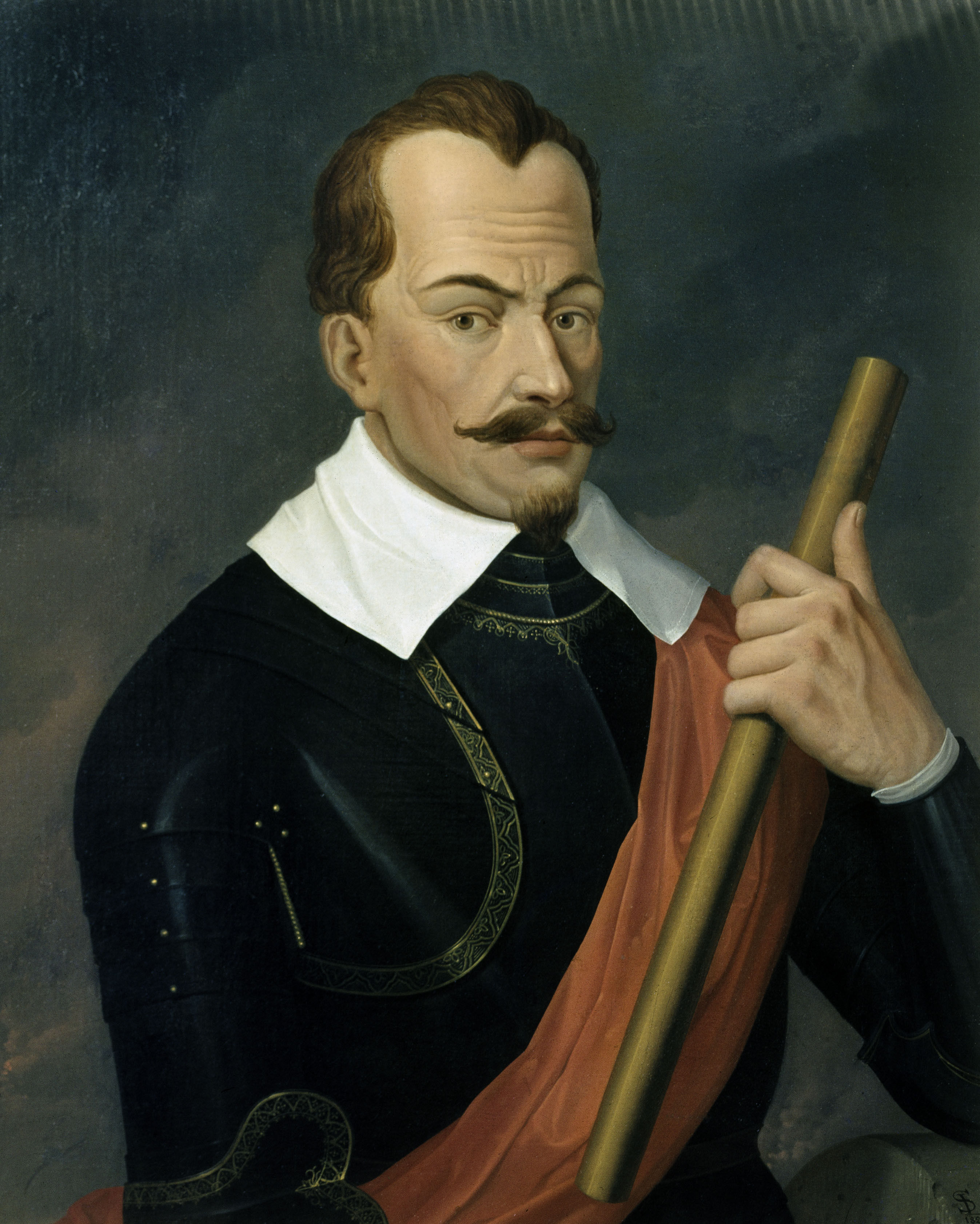
Albrecht von Waldstein (Wallenstein)

- Jan VI of Valdštejn, Bishop of Olomouc 1302–1311
- Wok of Waldstein, a Bohemian noble and a notable figure in the Hussite movement
- Jan (1508 – 15 June 1576) was Supreme Land Judge (nejvyšší zemský sudí) of Bohemia from 1554 to 1570 and, until 1576, Supreme Chamberlain (nejvyšší komorník). He was a follower of the utraquist (Hussite) faith.
  - His son, Adam the Younger (8 June 1570 – 24 August 1638), was also appointed Supreme Land Judge (1608) and later (1611) became zemský hofmistr (Land Hofmeister). He was a faithful Catholic supporter of the Holy Roman Emperor during the anti-Habsburg Bohemian Revolt and for these services he was granted more lands and posts in 1621. In 1627 was appointed Supreme Burgrave (viceroy) of Bohemia and a year later was elevated to the status of Reichsgraf of the Holy Roman Empire. These distinctions were received with mixed feelings – as a Bohemian šlechtic (nobleman), he still recognized old Bohemian statehood and rules, which banned foreign ranks and titles. With the support of other Bohemian noblemen, he brought about the abandonment of the policy of appointing more and more reichsgrafs. He wished to be allowed to die as a Bohemian pán (lord).
- Albrecht von Wallenstein (24 September 1583 – 25 February 1634) Duke of Friedland (Frýdlant), Mecklenburg & Fürst (Prince) of Sagan (Żagań), was a famous Imperial general during the Thirty Years' War, known for his immense ambitions and tragic end.
- Ladislaus Burian (1591 – 8 October 1645) was a general.

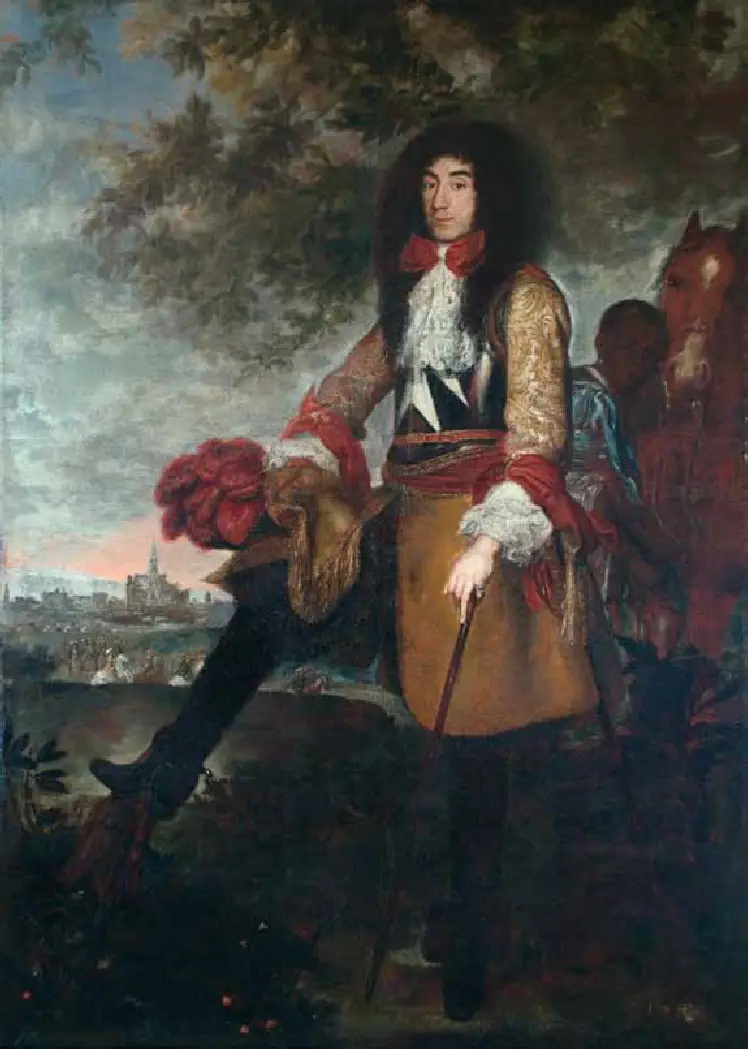
Portrait of Franz Augustin von Waldstein by Jan de Herdt

- Franz Augustin von Waldstein (died on 11 August 1684) was first a Knight of Malta and Grand Bailli. Under Emperor Leopold I, he served as Captain of the Lifeguard of Halberdiers and finally as Colonel and Court Marshal. He was a Knight of the Golden Fleece.
- Karl Ernst (Karel Arnošt) (4 May 1661 – 7 January 1713) was the Austrian ambassador to Spain, Savoy and Brandenburg. When in 1703 he returned from a diplomatic mission to France and Portugal on a Portuguese ship, he was captured by the French and held at Vincennes for nearly a year. His release came as a prisoner exchange for the French marshal François de Neufville, duc de Villeroy.
- Georg Christian von Waldstein (Prague, 16 April 1743 – Litomyšl, 6 October 1791) was the Bohemian great-grandfather of King Ferdinand II of Portugal, Prince August of Saxe-Coburg and Gotha and Princess Victoria, Duchess of Nemours.
- Franz de Paula Adam von Waldstein (14 February 1759 – 24 May 1823) was an Austrian soldier, explorer and naturalist.
- Ferdinand Ernst Gabriel von Waldstein (24 March 1762 – 26 May 1823) was a statesman and an early patron of famous composer Ludwig van Beethoven.
- Emmanuel Ernst von Waldstein was the 6th Bishop of Litoměřice, a patron of art and science.
