= Waldstein Castle =

Burg Waldstein
- Fischerbach

Site information
- Type: Hilltop castle
- Code: DE-BW
- Condition: Wall remains

Location
- Coordinates: 48.3235°N 8.1369°E
- Height: 550 m above sea level (NN)

Site history
- Built: before 1353

Garrison information
- Occupants: Nobility

Waldstein Castle (German: Burg Waldstein) is a ruined castle on an eminence near Franzosenhof in the Waldstein valley near the village of Fischerbach in Ortenaukreis in the south German state of Baden-Württemberg.

The hill castle was built by the lords of Waldstein, was mentioned in the records in 1353, but fell into ruins after 1500. Of the former castle site on a rock plateau of 40 by 10 metres, only a few sections of the ruined walls remain.

== See also ==
- List of castles in Baden-Württemberg

== Sources ==
- Klein, Kurt (1997). Burgen, Schlösser und Ruinen. Zeugen der Vergangenheit im Ortenaukreis. Reiff Schwarzwaldverlag. Offenburg. ISBN 3-922663-47-8
