= Burgruine Kaja =

Castle in Lower Austria

- Lower Austria, Austria
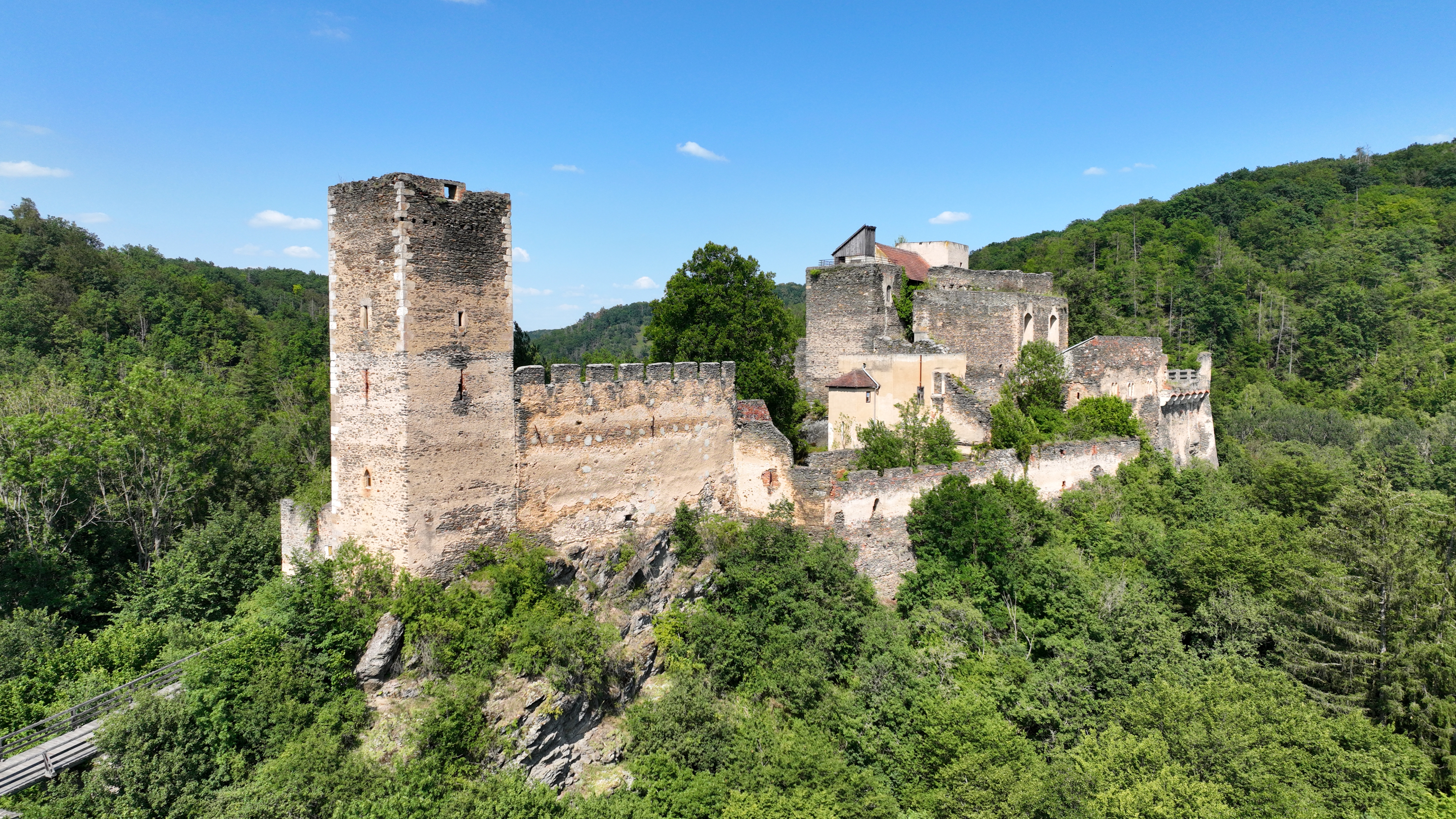
- Kaja Castle near Merkersdorf in Lower Austria

Site information
- Type: Castle

Location
- Coordinates: 48.8266°N 15.8880°E

Burgruine Kaja is a castle in Lower Austria, Austria.

== See also ==
- List of castles in Austria
