= Marquis of Santa Cruz (1569) =

Spanish hereditary title

Marquisate of Santa Cruz
- Creation date: 11 October 1569
- Created by: Philip II
- Peerage: Peerage of Spain
- First holder: Alvaro de Bazan, 1st Marquis of Santa Cruz
- Present holder: Álvaro Fernández-Villaverde y Silva, 15th Marquis of Santa Cruz

Marquis of Santa Cruz (Spanish: Marqués de Santa Cruz) sometimes known as Marquis of Santa Cruz de Mudela, is a hereditary title in the Peerage of Spain, accompanied by the dignity of Grandee and granted in 1569 by Philip II to Álvaro de Bazán, an important admiral who defeated the Ottoman Empire at the Battle of Lepanto. It takes its name from the town of Santa Cruz de Mudela, in Southern Spain.

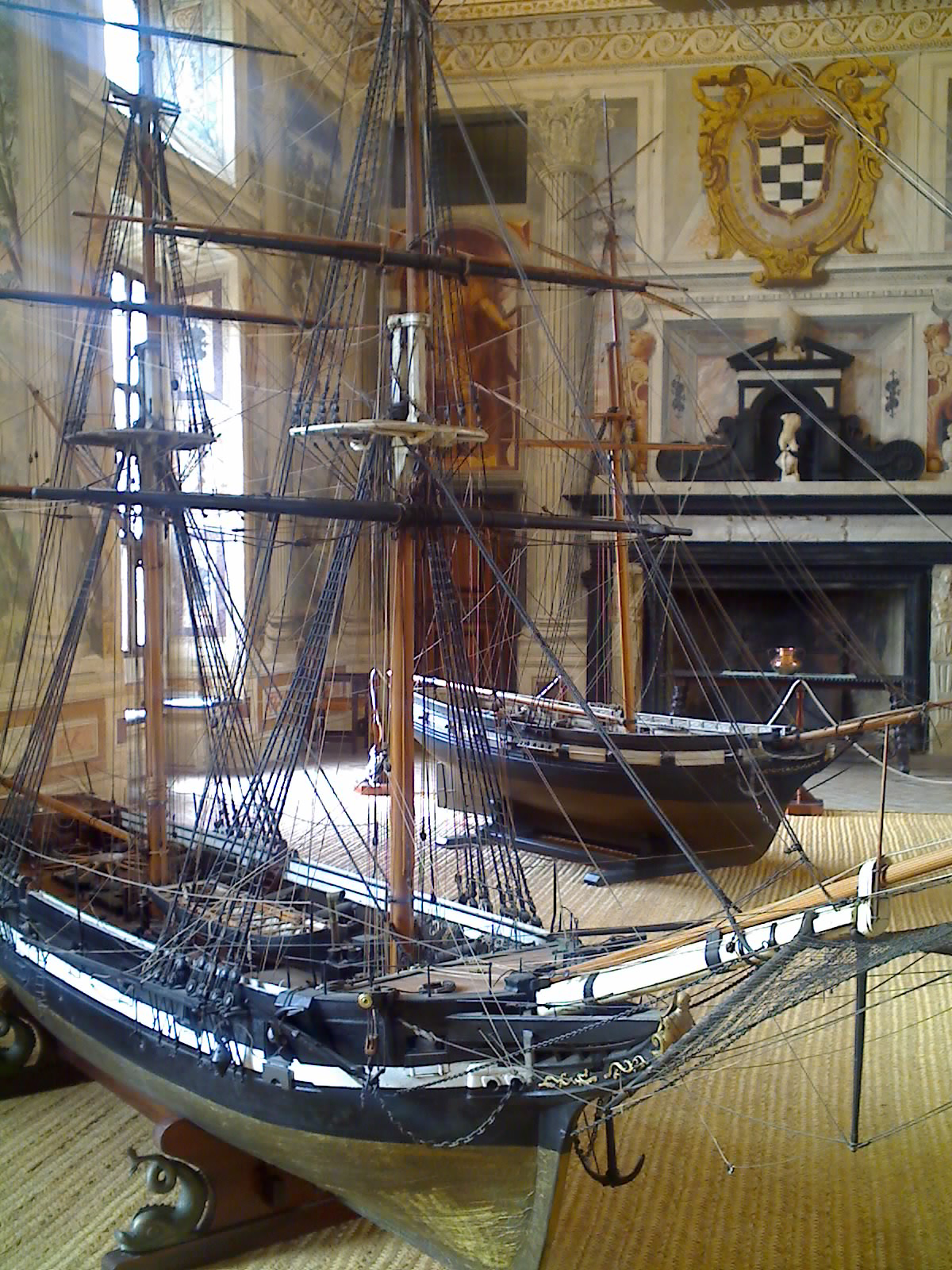
Interior of the Palace of the Marquis of Santa Cruz in Viso del Marqués

== Marquises of Santa Cruz (1569) ==
- Alvaro de Bazan, 1st Marquis of Santa Cruz (1569-1588)
- Alvaro de Bazan, 2nd Marquis of Santa Cruz (1588-1644)
- Álvaro de Bazán, 3rd Marquis of Santa Cruz (1644-1660)
- María Eugenia de Bazán y Doria, 4th Marchioness of Santa Cruz (1660-1677)
- Francisco Diego de Bazán y Doria, 5th Marquis of Santa Cruz (1667-1680)
- José Bernardino de Bazán y Pimentel, 6th Marquis of Santa Cruz (1680-1693)
- Álvaro Benavides Bazán, 7th Marquis of Santa Cruz (1693-1737)
- Pedro de Silva-Bazán y Alagón, 8th Marquis of Santa Cruz (1737-1744)
- José Joaquín de Silva-Bazán, 9th Marquis of Santa Cruz (1744-1802)
- José Gabriel de Silva-Bazán, 10th Marquis of Santa Cruz (1802 -1839)
- Francisco de Borja de Silva-Bazán y Téllez-Girón, 11th Marquis of Santa Cruz (1839-1889)
- Álvaro de Silva-Bazán y Fernández de Córdova, 12th Marquis of Santa Cruz (1890-1894)
- Mariano de Silva y Carvajal, 13th Marquis of Santa Cruz (1895-1940)
- Casilda de Silva y Fernández de Henestrosa, 14th Marchioness of Santa Cruz (1956-2008)
- Álvaro Fernández-Villaverde y Silva, 15th Marquis of Santa Cruz (2009-)

== See also ==
- List of current grandees of Spain
