= Leonardo Gómez Torrego =

- Born: November 6, 1942 (age 83); Mozoncillo, Segovia, Castile and León, Spain
- Education: PhD in Romance philology
- Occupations: Grammarian, philologist
- Employer: Spanish National Research Council (CSIC)
- Notable work: Gramática didáctica del español, Análisis sintáctico: Teoría y práctica, Análisis morfológico: Teoría y práctica, Los valores del "se", Teoría y práctica del análisis sintáctico, El lenguaje actual de los jóvenes, Manual del español correcto, Hablar y escribir correctamente
- Movement: Descriptive grammar, Prescriptive grammar, Structural linguistics, Functional linguistics
- Children: Míriam Gómez-Morán
- Awards: Commander of the Order of Alfonso X the Wise; Corresponding member of the Royal Spanish Academy (since 2015)

Leonardo Gómez Torrego (born 6 November 1942) is a Spanish Romance philologist, university professor, researcher at the Spanish National Research Council (CSIC), and grammarian active during the late 20th and early 21st centuries.

== Biography ==
Gómez Torrego was born in Mozoncillo (Segovia, Spain) in 1942. Coming from a modest background, he showed a strong interest in the Spanish language and the humanities from an early age, encouraged by teachers like Don Justo. He completed his studies through scholarships and pursued his pre-university education at the Claretian school in Segovia, where he was already teaching fellow students with the approval of his professors.

He earned a doctorate in Romance philology from the University of Madrid. He served as a high school professor and later became a tenured scientist at the Institute of Language, Literature, and Anthropology within the CSIC, specializing in Descriptive linguistics. A functional linguist, he also taught at the Autonomous University of Madrid, the Complutense University of Madrid, and the University of Puerto Rico. He has lectured in various institutions including the Menéndez Pelayo International University in Santander and the University of Salamanca.

His work as a linguist has focused primarily on language teaching from various perspectives: syntax, morphology, and spelling. He authored the influential Gramática didáctica del español and co-authored six textbooks in the "Mester" and "Contexto" series with Enrique Páez and Andrés Amorós for Ediciones SM. Works in which he not only lists and structures "the changes made by the RAE, but also, with a critical spirit, judges them" in a didactic spirit and with the aim of making them understandable to the reader.

He collaborated with the Royal Spanish Academy on the Nueva gramática de la lengua española and the Diccionario panhispánico de dudas. He is a member of the Advisory Council of Fundéu and honorary member of the Unión de Correctores (UniCo). As a member of the Fundéu Advisory Board, he has worked to promote the use of correct Spanish and launch an app for users to answer questions from mobile phones or other devices.

He collaborated with the Instituto Cervantes on the radio program Un idioma sin fronteras on Radio Exterior de España for over a decade and was featured on TV programs such as Al habla and Palabra por palabra (TVE2), as well as El cazador de palabras (Telemadrid).

He is editor of the Cuadernos de Lengua Española collection published by Arco/Libros and co-director of the journal Español Actual. He has also served on the advisory board of the Revista de Filología Española.

He received the Commander’s Cross of the Order of Alfonso X the Wise from the Spanish Ministry of Education for his contributions to the Spanish language. In December 2015, he was elected corresponding member of the Royal Spanish Academy, representing the Autonomous Community of Madrid.

His daughter, Míriam Gómez-Morán, is a professional pianist, fortepianist, and harpsichordist.

== Selected works ==
- Teoría y práctica de la sintaxis (1985), Madrid: Alhambra Universidad.
- Valores gramaticales de "se" (1992), Madrid: Arco/Libros.
- Manual de español correcto (1993), Madrid: Arco/Libros.
- Ortografía de uso del español actual (2000), Madrid: Ediciones SM.
- Análisis sintáctico. Teoría y práctica (2002), Madrid: Ediciones SM. Foreword by Ignacio Bosque.
- Nuevo Manual de Español Correcto (2002–2003), Madrid: Arco/Libros. 2 volumes.
- Hablar y escribir correctamente: gramática normativa del español actual (2006), Madrid: Arco/Libros. 2 volumes.
- Análisis morfológico: teoría y práctica (2007), Madrid: Ediciones SM.
- Gramática didáctica del español (2007), Madrid: Ediciones SM.
