= María Moliner =

Spanish librarian and lexicographer (1900–1981)

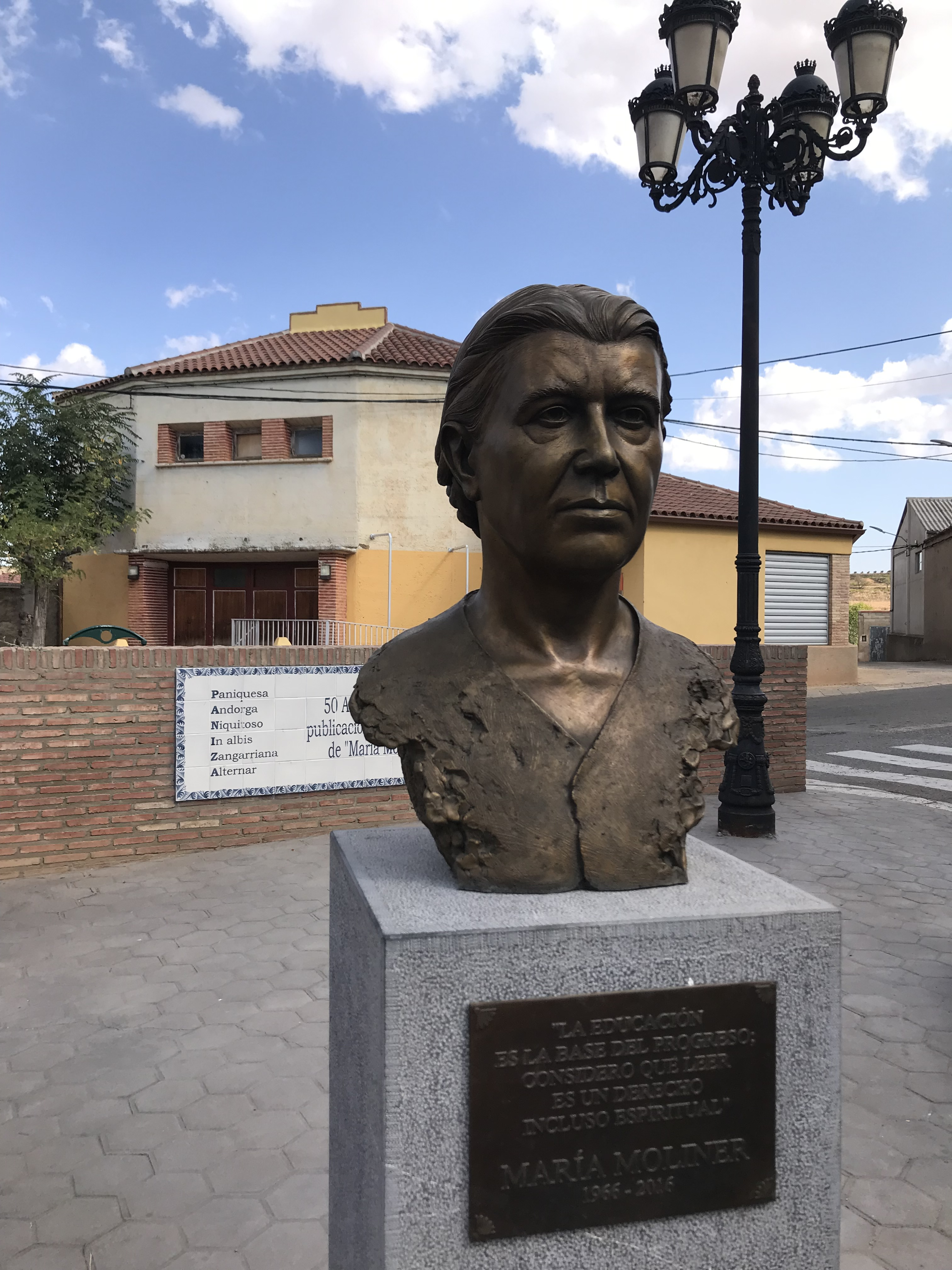

María Moliner (30 March 1900 – 22 January 1981) was a Spanish librarian and lexicographer. She is perhaps best known for her Diccionario de uso del español, first published in 1966–1967, when she completed the work started in 1952.

== Biography ==
María Juana Moliner Ruiz was the eldest daughter of Enrique Moliner, a doctor and son of a doctor, and Matilde Ruiz. At the age of two, her family moved from Zaragoza to Almazán in the border province of Soria. While a teenager her father left for Argentina and never came back, while Moliner, according to her son Fernando, lived with her mother, sister Matilde and brother Enrique in severe poverty. She pursued her Bachillerato at the Instituto General y Técnico Cardenal Cisneros, and obtained a degree in History in 1921 from the University of Zaragoza.

She married Fernando Ramón Ferrando, a physics graduate, in 1925 and had four children. Years later the couple moved to Valencia.

In 1946, Moliner was put in charge of the library at the Superior Technical School of Industrial Engineers in Madrid, until her retirement in 1970. In the early 1950s, she started work on her Diccionario de uso del español, getting up at about five in the morning, working a little, watering her flowers, going to work, having a small siesta before returning to her dictionary work. Her method was to look up words, read newspapers and note words she had heard in the street.

== Diccionario de uso del español ==
In 1952 her son Fernando brought her a book from Paris that caught her attention, the Learner's Dictionary of Current English by A.S. Hornby (1948). She had noticed the shortcomings of the DRAE, the official dictionary published by the Real Academia Española (Spanish Royal Academy), she was already making notes on terms, so this English book gave her the idea of making a dictionary. By then, she began composing her Diccionario de uso del español which she thought she would have finished within two years but in reality it took more than fifteen years of work at her home. In 1955, at the request of the academic Dámaso Alonso, who followed her work with interest and had connections with the Gredos publishing. Moliner eventually signed a contract with them for the future publication of her dictionary, whose typographic edition was extremely laborious.

The first edition (and the only one authorized by her) was published in 1966-67 by Editorial Gredos. It was immediately successful and the high regard in which it was held is summed up in Miguel Delibes' observation that "it is a work that justifies a whole lifetime" ("Es una obra que justifica toda una vida"). In 1998 a second edition that consisted of two volumes and a CD-ROM, as well as an abridged edition in a volume was published. The third and last revision was published in September 2007 and consists of two volumes.

A María Moliner reading campaign is supported by the Ministry of Culture of the Government of Spain. Since 1998, the campaign for the promotion of reading in Spanish towns of less than 50,000 inhabitants has been in the format of a competition aimed at towns meeting these criteria, giving prizes to the best projects or activities for promoting reading among children and young people. It is held under the auspices of the Ministry of Culture and the collaboration of the Spanish Federation of Municipalities and Provinces and, since 1992, with the collaboration of the Coca-Cola España Foundation. 350 libraries are awarded a prize of books made up of 200 children's and young adults' books. Since 2002 the three best projects receive cash prizes as well. The competition is held annually and all settlements with up to 50,000 inhabitants that have a staffed local library may submit their projects.

== Relationship with the Real Academia Española ==
On 7 November 1972 the writer Daniel Sueiro interviewed María Moliner in the Heraldo de Aragón. The headline was a question: "Will María Moliner be the first woman to join the Academy?". Dámaso Alonso, Rafael Lapesa and Pedro Laín Entralgo had recommended her. But the linguist and philologist Emilio Alarcos Llorach was elected instead. Moliner observed:

Yes, my biography is very short, since my only achievement is my dictionary. I mean, I don't have a long list of works to justify me being admitted [...] My work is clearly the dictionary. Of course, the fact is that a philologist has been admitted to the Academy and not me; but if the dictionary had been written by a man, people would say, "Why is this man not a member of the Academy?"

She was nominated again in 1979 but this time she lost out to the female poet and academic, Carmen Conde.

Violeta Demonte, Spanish professor at Universidad Autónoma de Madrid remarked about Moliner's dictionary: "Since the theoretical bases and the criterion for analysis are not always clear and the basic principles have intuitive origin, the usefulness of her dictionary is uneven."

Moliner received the "Lorenzo Nieto López" prize in 1973, awarded by the Academy.

In 1981, L. Permanyer wrote a strong critique about what he considered the stance of most academics toward Moliner.

== Biographical Play ==
In June 2013 Moliner's story was portrayed in a new play by Manuel Calzada Pérez, El Diccionario (The Dictionary) performed first in Madrid and subsequently brought to London as part of the Festival of Spanish Theatre in London (Festelón), with the actress Vicky Peña in the lead role, alongside Helio Pedregal and Lander Iglesias.

== Tribute ==
On 30 March 2019, search engine Google commemorated María Moliner with a Doodle on her 119th birth anniversary.
