= Café Novelty =

Oldest café in Salmanca, Spain

Coordinates: 40°57′55.23″N 5°39′49.09″W

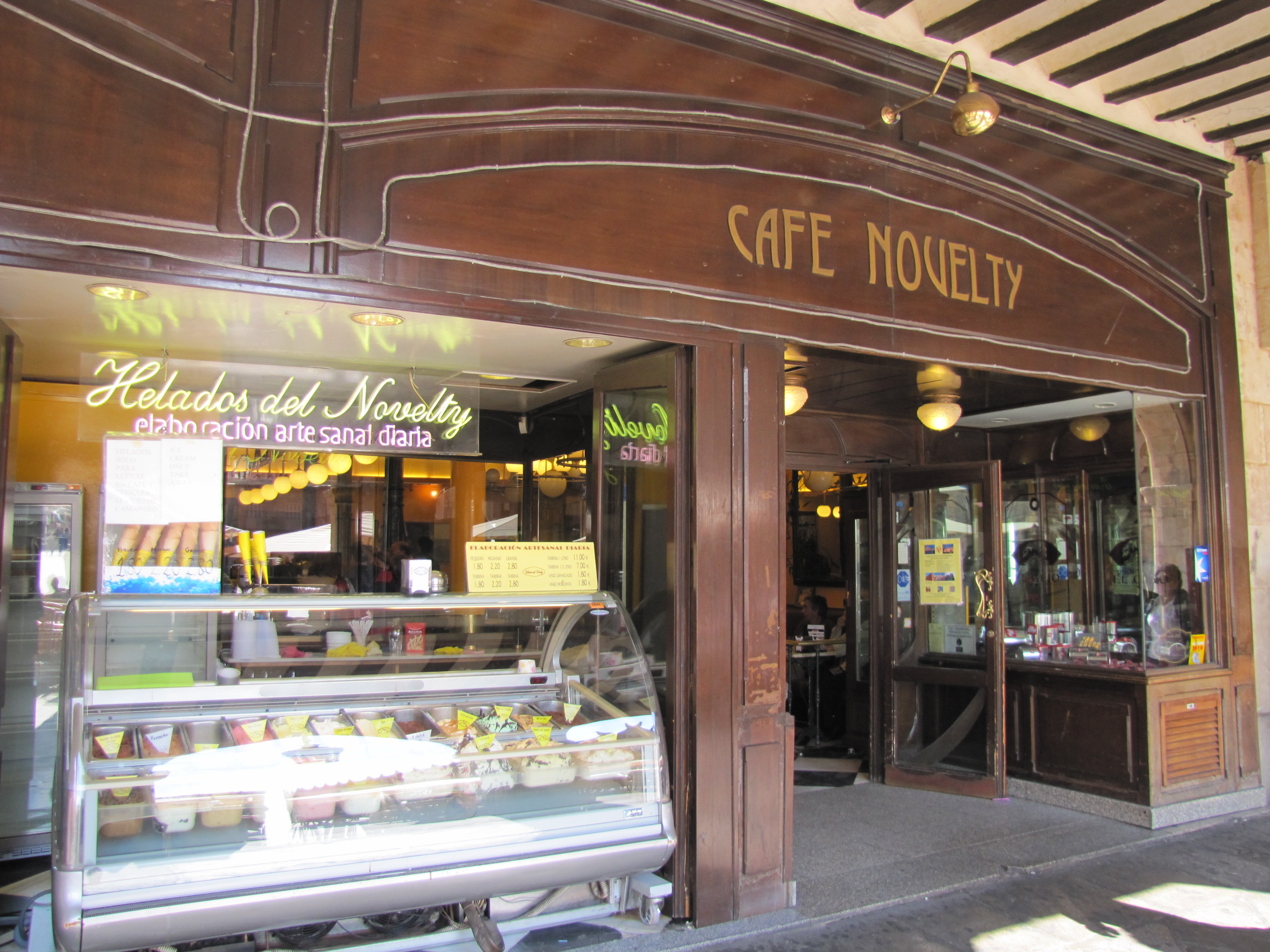
The entrance to the Café from The Plaza Mayor of Salamanca.

The Café Novelty (Coffeehouse Novelty) is the oldest café in the city of Salamanca (Spain), which was founded in 1905 and is situated in the main square of the city, Plaza Mayor de Salamanca. Its first owners were the García brothers. From the beginning of the Spanish Civil War to 1964 it was named Café Nacional. It was 4 times bigger than it is nowadays and it very soon became a favorite meeting place for writers, artists and politicians, due to its privileged position in the city.

The most outstanding patrons of the Café Novelty are Miguel de Unamuno, the Spanish philosopher that organized the literary social gathering (tertulia), Ortega y Gasset, Antonio Tovar, Juan Benet, Pedro Laín Entralgo, Francisco Umbral, Carmen Martín Gaite, Gonzalo Torrente Ballester and Víctor García de la Concha. At its tables, in 1923, Dionisio Ridruejo decided to found the Football Club of Salamanca, and also the Spanish National Radio, between 1936 and 1937.

From 1999, with the help of the members of the cultural society of Salamanca, a magazine of the café, "Los papeles del Novelty", has been published.

== History of Café ==
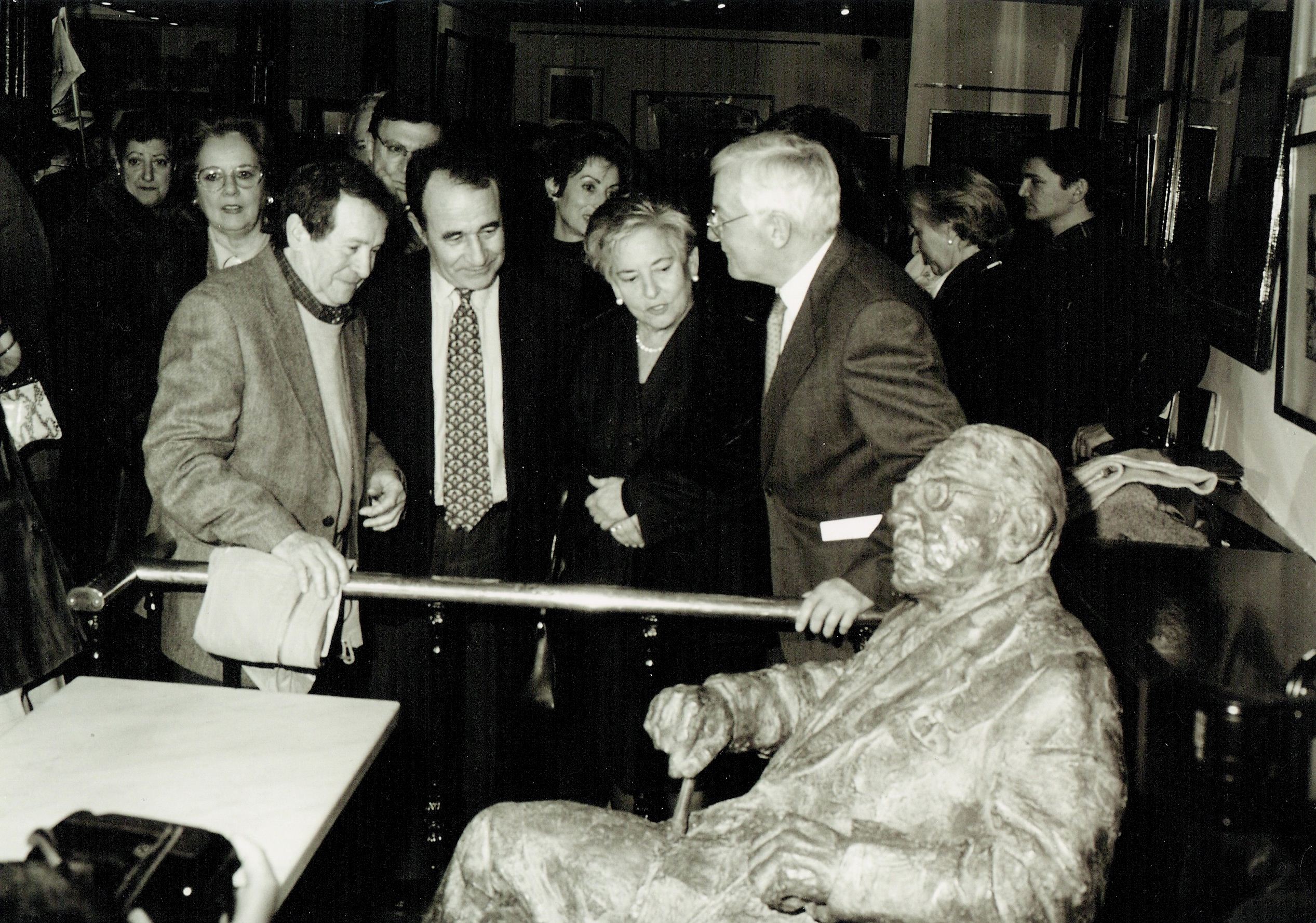
The Presentation of the sculpture in honour of Gonzalo Torrente Ballester in the Café Novelty in 2000. From the right to the left, the director of The Royal Spanish Academy Víctor García de la Concha, the widow of Torrente, the author Carlos Casares and the sculptor Fernando Mayoral.

Its first owners were Vicente and Federico García Martín. The interior of the Café occupied a space 4 times bigger than it has today. It had billiard tables, a restaurant, and a dance pavilion with colored atrium. One enters the salons of the Café through a revolving brass door that exemplifies the chic detail of the interior. To the right of the entrance usually united merchants, stock-breeders, manufacturers and rightists participate in the daily tertulia, and to the left, liberals, medics, lawyers and professors of the university etc. take seat. In the round salon with glass colored ceiling once played an orchestra and there were organized many luxurious weddings, and visitors liked to dance there. At the table of Café Novelty, in 1923, was signed the resolution of foundation of Football Club of Salamanca.

Up until the Spanish Civil War Café Novelty had a luxury, splendid life and proof of the special role of the Café at that time was an incognito dinner organized for the Spanish king, Alfonso XIII. During the Spanish Civil war the clientele of Café were divided, as was the country. Some people such as Gil Robles were in exile, others such as Maurin were executed by shooting. Miguel de Unamuno, who used to visit the terrace of Café, took shelter in street of Bordadores and died some months later. But the main contingent of visitors rose in joining the "band" of General Franco, as did the rest of the city The intellectual section of this "band" was often made the centre of promotion and publication in Café Novelty after the new government was placed in Salamanca. The name was changed to Café National until 1964. Laín Entralgo, Dionisio Ridruejo, Agustín de Foxá founded the Spanish National Radio between 1936 and 1937 in the tables of the Café.

=== From 1950s till 1970s ===
During some years in the 1950s–1960s, the owner of the café was D. Aureliano, an elegant merchant that had suspicious business in Tanger. He sold the café to D. Agustin Dominguez, the grandfather of the present owners. During the epoch of decadence in 1963 the restaurant was closed and the famous wine depository (bodega) was shut down. In 1964 the son of Agustin Francisco began to manage the café, renovated it in the style of the epoch and gave back the original name, which has not changed since.

In the beginning of the 1970s it was repaired again and decorated with corner sofas. The café turned into a centre of political secrecy, often opposed to the ideology of Franco, and in its remote salons were held reunions to write manifestos and to hide duplicating machines. In 1978 the city hall of Salamanca, which was the owner of the real estate, proposed the necessity of confiscation of certain premises, and after the trial on 1 April, the café was closed. But after difficult negotiations and the gift of a one-third part of the building to the city hall (which was used for its offices) the café was once again opened in 1979 and redecorated by Salvador Yáñez.

=== From the 1980s ===
From the 1980s until now it recovered its bygone splendor as has the University of Salamanca and the city. The 25 years that Gonzalo Torrente Ballester enjoyed in the city and frequenting the café, helped to return the real position of Café Novelty to a position of meaningful influence in the cultural life. The trace of the writer in Café was so significant that in 2000 one monument was inaugurated in memory of the Spanish professor and author. It is a statue sited in his favorite corner of Café made by one friend of the writer' sculptor Fernando Mayoral. At the present time it has privileged position in the city and still is being the favorite place of meeting of artists, writers, politicians and businessmen. One of the frequenters is the president of the Royal Spanish Academy Victor Garcia de la Concha, the basque writer Juan Manuel de Prada, the Mexican author Jorge Volpy and the poet Paco Novelty.

== Well-known visitors ==
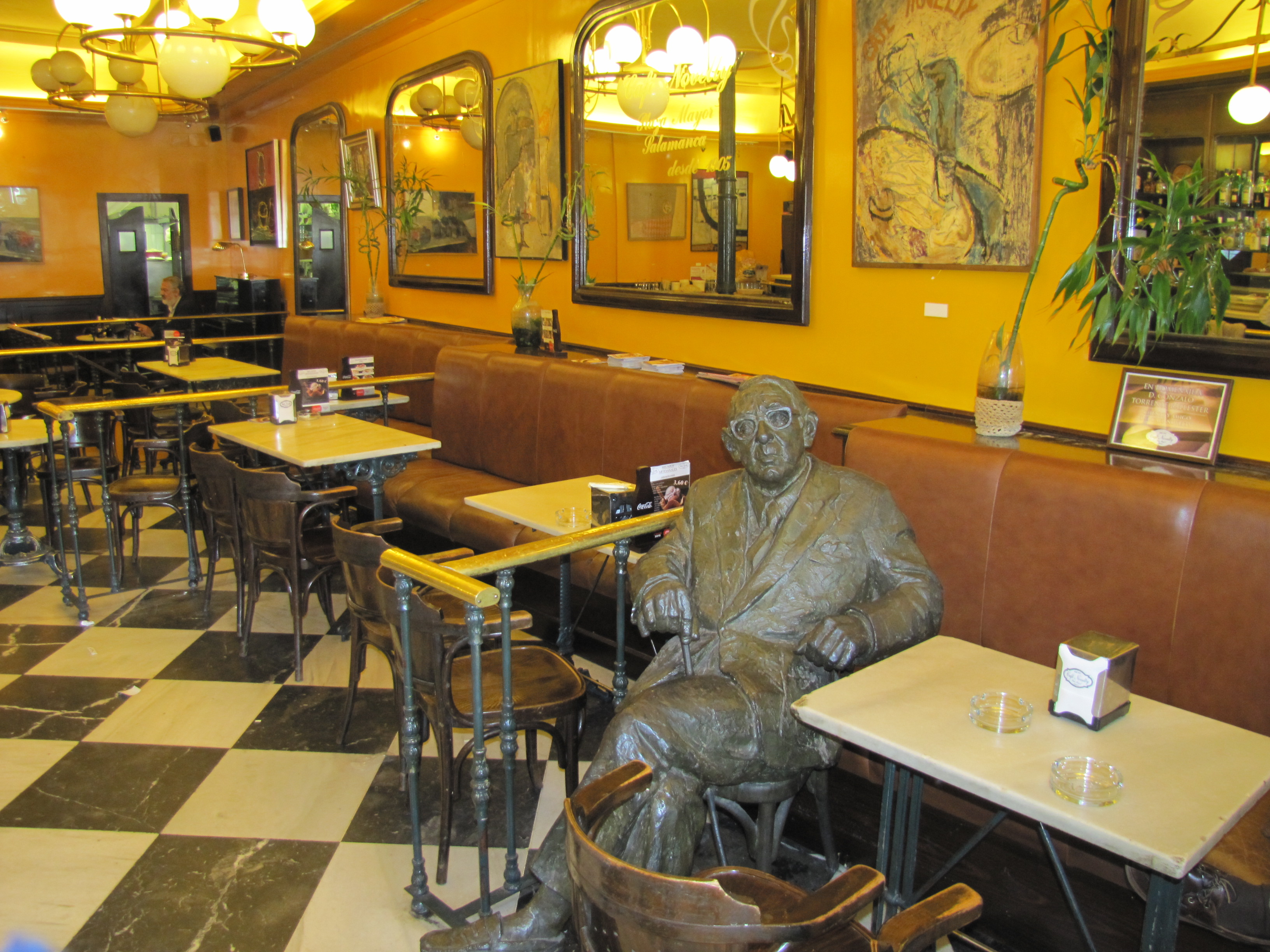
The statue of Gonzalo Torrente Ballester in Café Novelty, work of Fernando Mayoral.

=== Writers ===
- Juan Marsé, Cabrera Infante and Ortega y Gasset came separately to persuade Unamuno to create a political party.
- Carmen Martín Gaite – author and habitual visitor.
- Poets Angel Gonzalez, Claudio Rodríguez, and Antonio Colinas.
- Gonzalo Torrente Ballester, Vargas Llosa, Francisco Umbral, and Juan Benet.

=== Artists ===
- sculptor Fernando Mayoral.
- José Ignacio Bermúdez Vázquez – graphic designer.

=== Politics ===
- In the 50s a banquet was held in honour of Francisco Franco when the University of Salamanca awarded him an honorary degree.
- The President of the United States of America – Jimmy Carter.
- The President of France – François Mitterrand.
- The President of the European Commission – Jacques Delors.
- Spanish politics: During the Spanish transition to democracy Santiago Carrillo organized political meetings in the city. The Prime Minister of Spain – José Luis Rodríguez Zapatero. Mariano Rajoy and Rodrigo Rato.

== Gallery ==
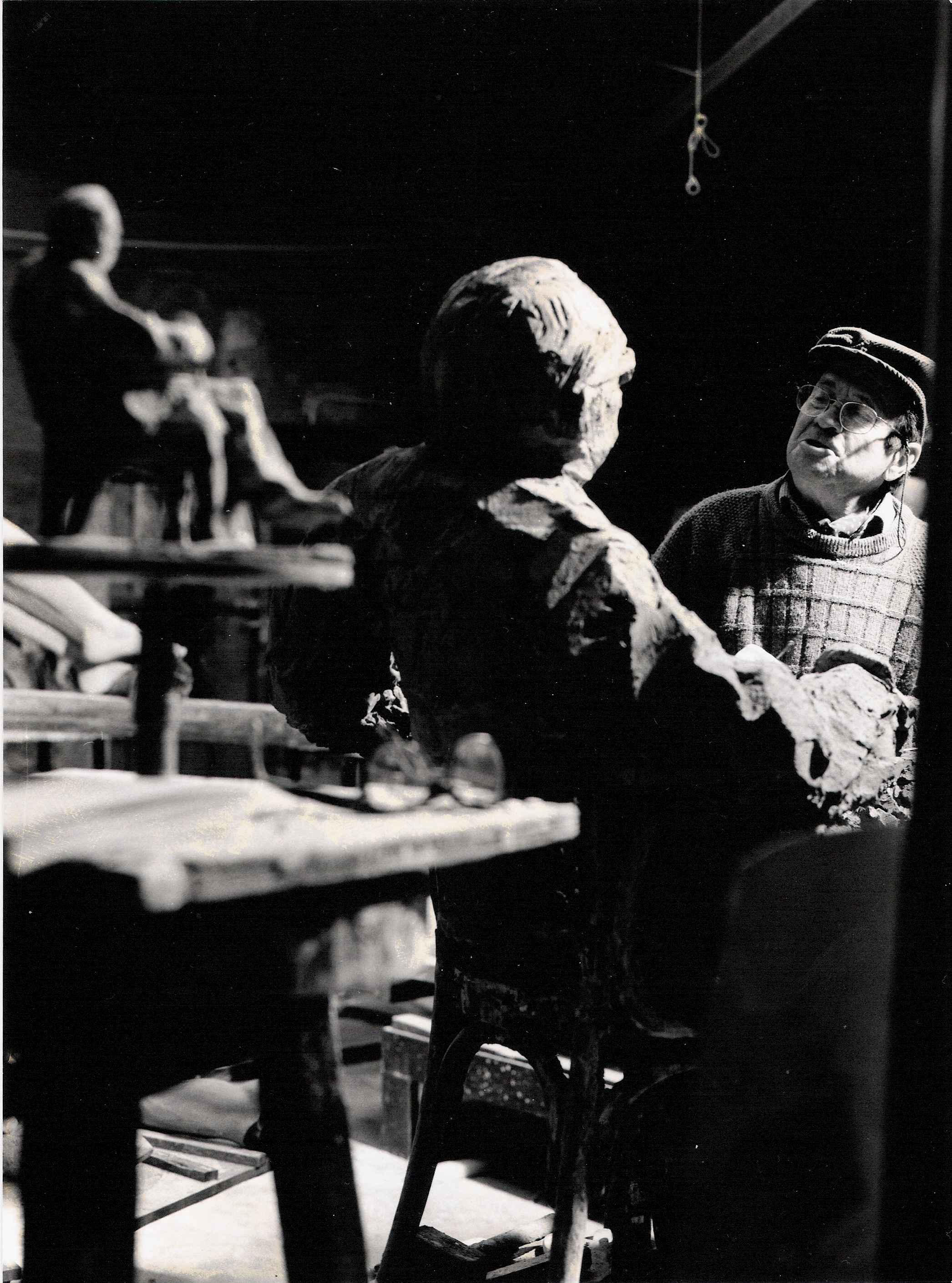
Fernando Mayoral with his sculpture in honor of Gonzalo Torrente Ballester.

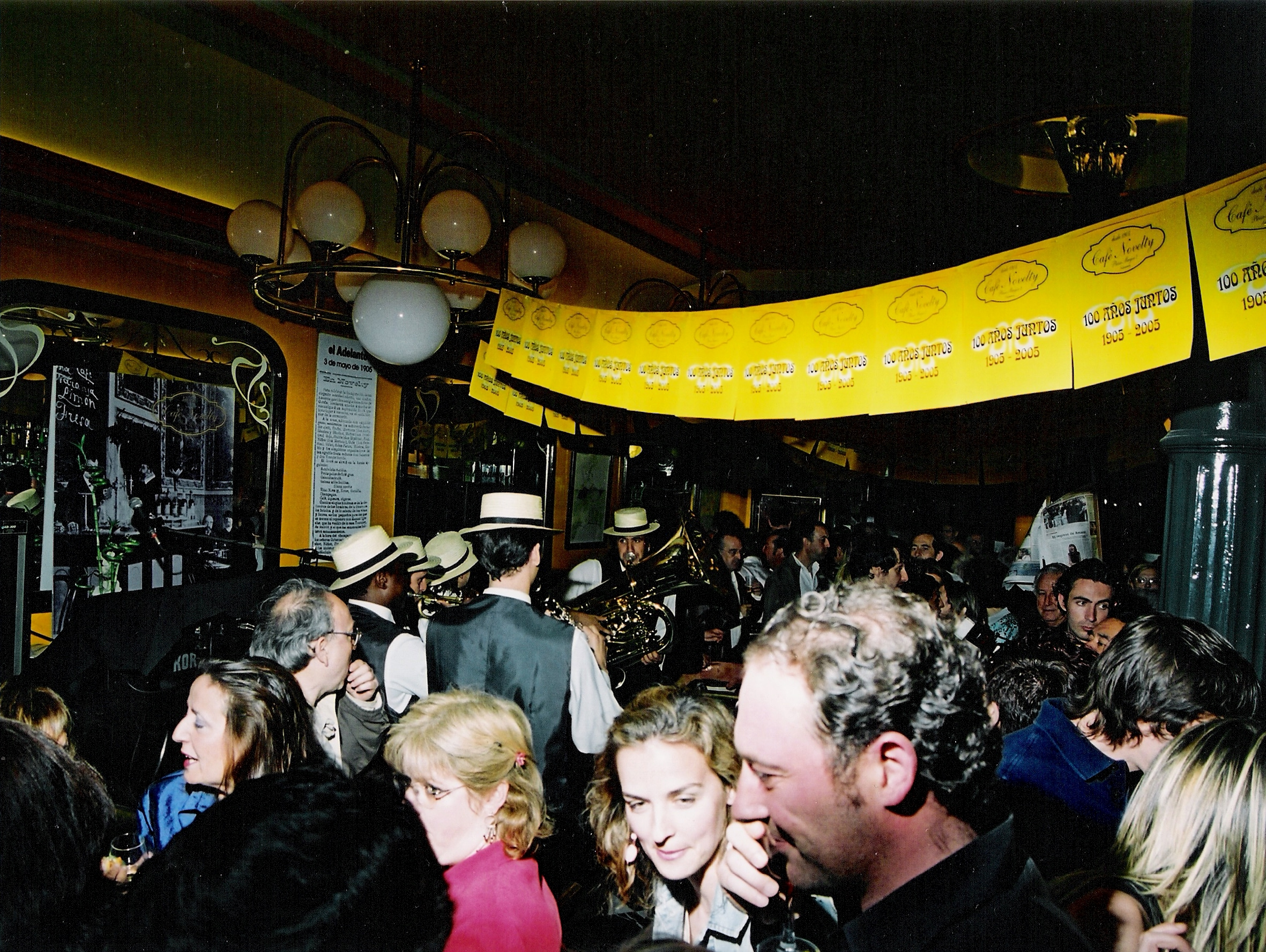
The party of centenary of Café Novelty.

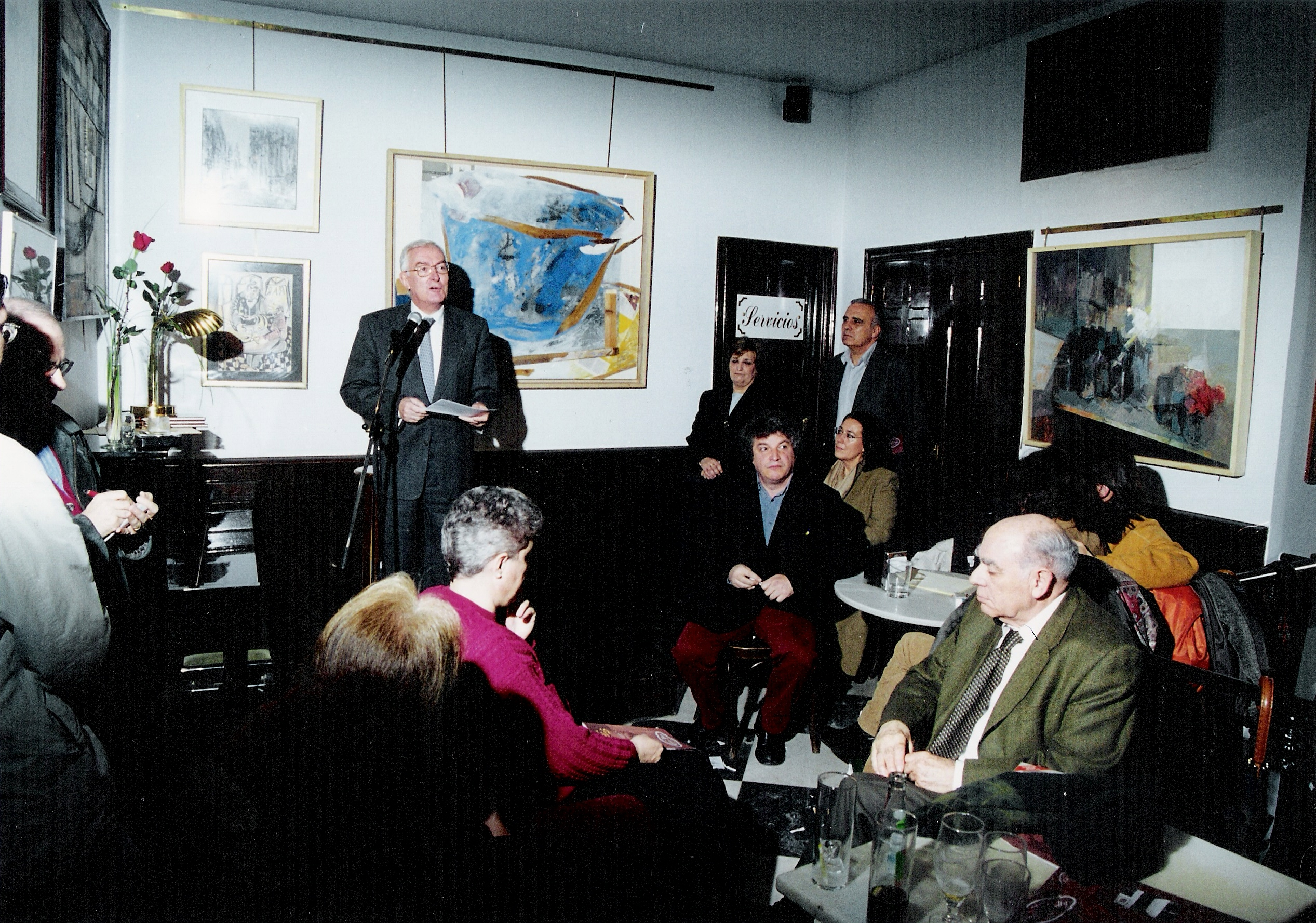
Víctor García de la Concha in one presentation in Café Novelty of Salamanca, in 1995, with authors Manuel Fernández Álvarez and Paco Novelty.

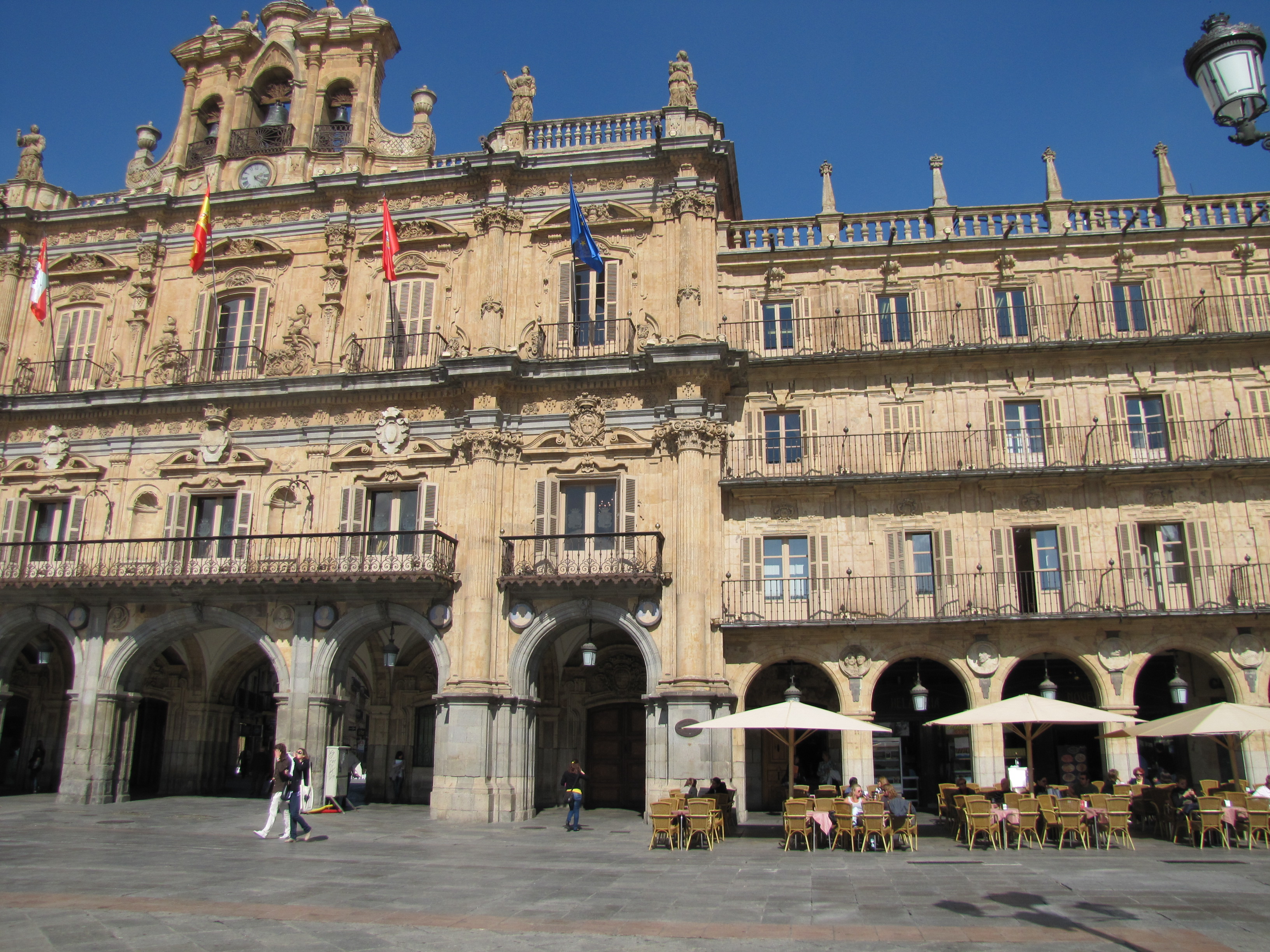
The city hall of Salamanca near to the terrace of café.

== Publications ==
- Grande del Brío, Ramón (), Un día en el Café Novelty , Librería Cervantes (Salamanca).
- Jesús Formigo, Pedro Ladoire, Paco Novelty y Francisco Castaño. (1999), "Café Novelty", Ediciones Café Novelty.
