= Los gozos y las sombras (TV series) =

Spanish television series (1982)

- Genre: Drama
- Based on: Los gozos y las sombras by Gonzalo Torrente Ballester
- Screenplay by: Jesús Navascués
- Directed by: Rafael Moreno Alba
- Starring: Amparo Rivelles; Eusebio Poncela; Charo López; Carlos Larrañaga
- Composer: Nemesio García Carril
- Country of origin: Spain
- Original language: Spanish
- No. of seasons: 1
- No. of episodes: 13

Production
- Producer: Jesús Navascués
- Cinematography: José García Galisteo
- Editor: Pedro del Rey
- Production company: Televisión Española
- Budget: 165 million ₧

Original release
- Network: TVE1
- Release: 25 March – 10 June 1982

Los gozos y las sombras (transl. The joys and the shadows) is a 1982 Spanish prime-time television series based on the novel trilogy of the same name by Gonzalo Torrente Ballester. Produced and written by Jesús Navascués for Televisión Española, it was directed by Rafael Moreno Alba and starred Amparo Rivelles, Eusebio Poncela, Charo López and Carlos Larrañaga. Its thirteen episodes premiered on TVE1 from 25 March to 10 June 1982.

== Plot ==
The story is set in Pueblanueva del Conde, a fictional seaside town on the Rías Baixas coast in northwestern Spain, at the end of the Second Spanish Republic and just before the beginning of the Spanish Civil War. The long-awaited return of Carlos Deza, the last of the lineage of the Churruchaos, who ruled the town since time immemorial, is seen as the last chance to dispute the supremacy of Cayetano Salgado, the new master of the town, who exercises it with the impunity provided by its economic power.

== Production ==
Originally intended as a ten-episode series of 60 minutes each, Televisión Española agreed to expand it to thirteen episodes due to the length and depth of the trilogy of novels it is based on, Los gozos y las sombras. Produced and written by Jesús Navascués and directed by Rafael Moreno Alba, it was supervised by Gonzalo Torrente Ballester himself, author of the novels. With a budget of 165 million pesetas, principal photography began in December 1980 and lasted seven months, with the exteriors shot in and around Pontevedra and Bueu and the interiors in Madrid. It took another seven months to complete the entire production. The series premiered on 25 March 1982 in prime-time on TVE1.

In 1984, it was the first audiovisual product dubbed into Galician and it was broadcast on Televisión de Galicia later.

== Cast ==
- Amparo Rivelles as Doña Mariana Sarmiento
- Eusebio Poncela as Carlos Deza
- Charo López as Clara Aldán
- Carlos Larrañaga as Cayetano Salgado
- Rafael Alonso
- José María Caffarel
- Rosalía Dans as Rosario 'La Galana'
- Manuel Galiana

== Accolades ==
=== Premios Ondas ===
| Year | Category | Result | Ref. |
|---|---|---|---|
| 1982 | Television National | Won | |

=== Fotogramas de Plata ===
| Year | Category | Recipient | Result | Ref. |
|---|---|---|---|---|
| 1982 | Best Television Performer | Charo López | Won | |
| 1982 | Best Television Performer | Amparo Rivelles | Nominated | |
| 1982 | Best Television Performer | Eusebio Poncela | Nominated | |

=== TP de Oro ===
| Year | Category | Recipient | Result | Ref. |
|---|---|---|---|---|
| 1982 | Best National Series | | Won | |
| 1982 | Best Actress | Charo López | Won | |
| 1982 | Best Actress | Amparo Rivelles | 2nd Place | |
| 1982 | Best Actress | Rosalía Dans | 3rd Place | |
| 1982 | Best Actor | Eusebio Poncela | 2nd Place | |
