= The Dumbfounded King =

- Film poster
- Directed by: Imanol Uribe
- Written by: Joan Potau; Gonzalo Torrente Ballester
- Based on: The King Amaz'd by Gonzalo Torrente Ballester
- Starring: Gabino Diego; Juan Diego; María Barranco
- Edited by: Teresa Font
- Music by: José Nieto
- Release date: 1 November 1991
- Running time: 106 minutes
- Countries: Spain; France; Portugal
- Language: Spanish

The Dumbfounded King (Spanish: El rey pasmado) is a 1991 French-Portuguese-Spanish comedy-historical film directed by Imanol Uribe and written by Joan Potau and Gonzalo Torrente Ballester. The screenplay was based on Torrente's 1989 novel The King Amaz'd.

== Plot ==
Story set in 17th century Spanish court, where King Philip IV, on a getaway with Count of Peña Andrada, is stunned to see the naked body of Marfisa, a prostitute of the town (in a pose reminiscent of the Rokeby Venus). After this discovery, the king decides to see the naked body of his wife, Queen Elisabeth of France.

Due to this the Grand Inquisitor is obliged to convene a meeting of theologians to discuss the matter. Both sides of the debate are represented by the figure of the friar Villaescusa, which ensures that the claim of the king is a serious sin that can bring punishment on the whole country and the Father Almeida, a Jesuit missionary who replies that the luck of the governed depends on the ability of its rulers rather than their morality and that the desire of the king is a private matter. Although the Queen is willing to accommodate to the wishes of the king, Villaescusa and his minions do enough to frustrate his desires. Finally, with the help of the Jesuit and the Count of la Peña Andrada, the King gets to meet with the queen alone in the monastery of San Plácido and achieves his goal.

Meanwhile, the Count-Duke of Olivares fears that he could being punished by God because he fails to have children with his wife, so he gets advice from Villaescusa, who informs him that the pleasure he and his wife obtain when performing the sexual act is to be blamed for the infertility. The "divinely inspired" solution proposed by Villaescusa is that the Earl and his wife copulate in the choir of the church of San Plácido (where by coincidence are also very nearly the kings) in front of the choir nuns. At the end of this sexual encounter the Count-Duke of Olivares receives two letters which informs him of the successful arrival of the Indian fleet to Cádiz and the victory of Spanish troops in Flanders. Villaescusa says that the happy ending is due to the sacrifices they all have passed, but the Count Duke replies that by the date of the letters it could be seen that the fleet had arrived in Cádiz two days ago "just the day King went whores". The Count-Duke sends Villaescusa to Rome with a sealed letter asking to not let him go until he has changed his attitude.

== Cast ==
- Gabino Diego as The King
- Laura del Sol as Marfisa
- Joaquim de Almeida as Father Almeida
- María Barranco as Lucrecia
- Juan Diego as Father Villaescusa
- Fernando Fernán Gómez as Grand Inquisitor
- Javier Gurruchaga as Valido
- Anne Roussel as The Queen
- Carme Elías as Abesse

== Production ==
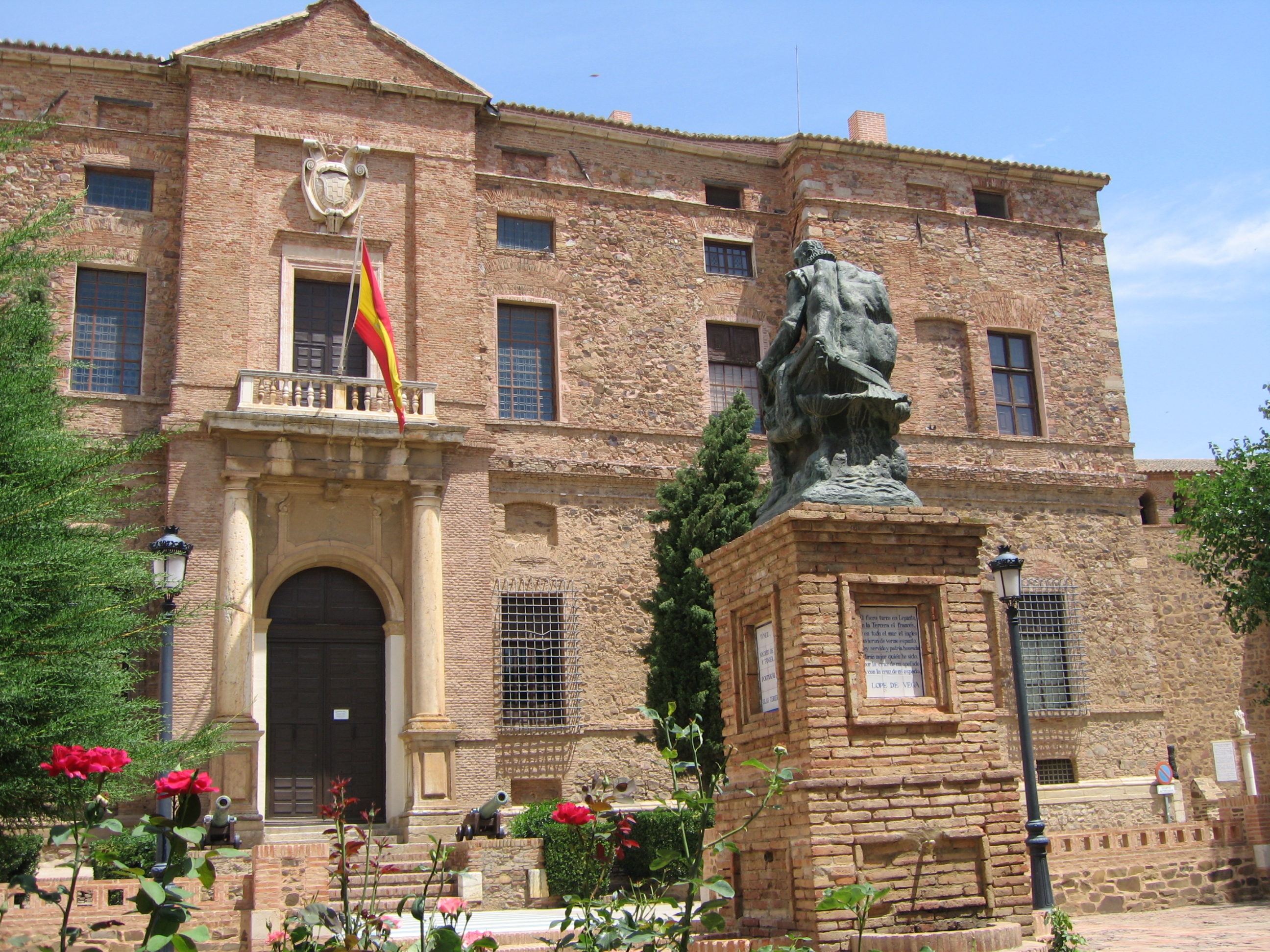
Palace of the Marquess of Santa Cruz

Most of the film was shot in the 16th century Palace of the Marquess of Santa Cruz in Viso del Marqués and at the Monastery of Uclés.

== Reception ==
Spanish critic Carlos Aguilar in his Guía del cine español says that the film has some flaws, such as the different treatment of historical characters, but these are outweighed by good realization and a good cast. Critics also noted the close resemblance of Gabino Diego and Gurruchaga with Philip IV and the Count-Duke of Olivares respectively.

== Awards and nominations ==
=== Won ===
- Goya Awards
  - Best Actor in a Supporting Role (Juan Diego)
  - Best Costume Design (Javier Artiñano)
  - Best Makeup and Hairstyles (Romana González and Josefa Morales)
  - Best Original Score (José Nieto)
  - Best Production Design (Félix Murcia)
  - Best Production Supervision (Andrés Santana)
  - Best Screenplay – Adapted (Joan Potau and Gonzalo Torrente Malvido)
  - Best Sound (Ricard Casals and Gilles Ortion)

=== Nominated ===
- Goya Awards
  - Best Actor in a Leading Role (Gabino Diego)
  - Best Actor in a Supporting Role (Javier Gurruchaga)
  - Best Actress in a Supporting Role (María Barranco)
  - Best Cinematography (Hans Burman)
  - Best Director (Imanol Uribe)
  - Best Film
