= Festival of Spanish Theatre in London (Festelón) =

The Festival of Spanish Theatre of London (FesTeLõn) has taken place in London every year since 2013, when it opened at the Greenwood Theatre, with a production of El Diccionario (The Dictionary) by Manuel Calzada, a play about the lexicographer María Moliner, with Vicky Peña starring in the lead role. Its objective is to bring contemporary theatre beyond the borders of Spain, working with professional Spanish theatre companies. The plays are usually performed in Spanish with English surtitles in order to ensure that they are accessible to the widest possible audience. The festival also includes a full programme of related talks and workshops to complement the stage performances, as well as bilingual “meet the cast” sessions, with Q&A.

== Production list ==
- 2013: El Diccionario (The Dictionary) by Manuel Calzada
- 2014: En un lugar del Quijote (Somewhere in Don Quixote) by Ron Lalá Teatro
- 2015: Las heridas del viento (Wounded by the Wind) by Juan Carlos Rubio (starring Kiti Mánver)
- 2015: La piedra oscura (The Dark Stone) by Alberto Conejero
- 2016: Don Quixote by Bambalina Theatre Company
- 2016: Arizona by Juan Carlos Rubio
- 2016: Los espejos de Don Quijote (Reflections of Cervantes in Don Quixote) by Alberto Herreros
- 2017: ➞Rosaura by Paula Rodríguez & Sandra Arpa
- 2017: ➞Big Boy by José Luis Montiel Chaves, Mario Ruz Martínez & David Roldán
- 2017: Himmelweg – Camino del Cielo (Way to Heaven) by Juan Mayorga
- 2017: ➞Encerrona (Lock-In), by Pepe Viyuela
- 2018: Qué raros son los hombres! (Men Are So Strange!) by José Ovejero
- 2018: Malvados de Oro (Golden Age Villains) by Jesús Laiz
- 2018: A secreto agravio, secreta venganza (A Secret Vengeance for a Secret Affront) after Pedro Calderón de la Barca
- 2018: Me siento pulga (Fleas) by Susana Hernández & Ascen López, after E. Jardiel Poncela & Miguel Mihura
- 2018: La vida es sueño: el Bululú (Life's a Dream: Solo Performance) by Pedro Calderón de la Barca / Jesús Torres
- 2018: Guyi Guyi by Juan Manuel Quiñonero & María Socorro García
- 2019: Yerma by Federico García Lorca / Projecte Ingenu
- 2019: Puños de harina (Powdered Fists) by Jesús Torres
- 2019: La Calderona by Rafael Boeta
- 2019: La Margarita del Tajo que dio nombre a Santarén by Ángela de Azevedo, adapted by María Gregorio & Anaïs Bleda
- 2019: Grillos y Luciérnagas (Crickets & Fireflies) by Valeria Fabretti
