= La saga/fuga de J. B. =

1972 novel by Gonzalo Torrente Ballester

- Author: Gonzalo Torrente Ballester
- Language: Spanish
- Publisher: Ediciones Destino
- Publication date: 1972
- Publication place: Spain
- Pages: 584

La saga/fuga de J. B. (lit. 'The Saga/Fugue of J. B.') is a 1972 novel by the Spanish writer Gonzalo Torrente Ballester. It is about the fictional city of Castroforte del Baralla, which cyclically has been threatened by destruction throughout the centuries, but has been saved by people with the initials J. B. The central character is the unemployed grammar teacher José Bastida who becomes associated with the heroic legends.

The novel is structured like a fugue. The narrative mode, where Bastida is a peripheral person who becomes central through his own imagination, was inspired by Don Quixote by Miguel de Cervantes. Castroforte del Baralla is primarily modelled after Pontevedra but also has elements of a mythified Paris.

The book received the Premio de la Crítica for Castilian-language narrative.
