= Juan Mayorga =

Spanish dramatist

The Most Excellent Juan Mayorga
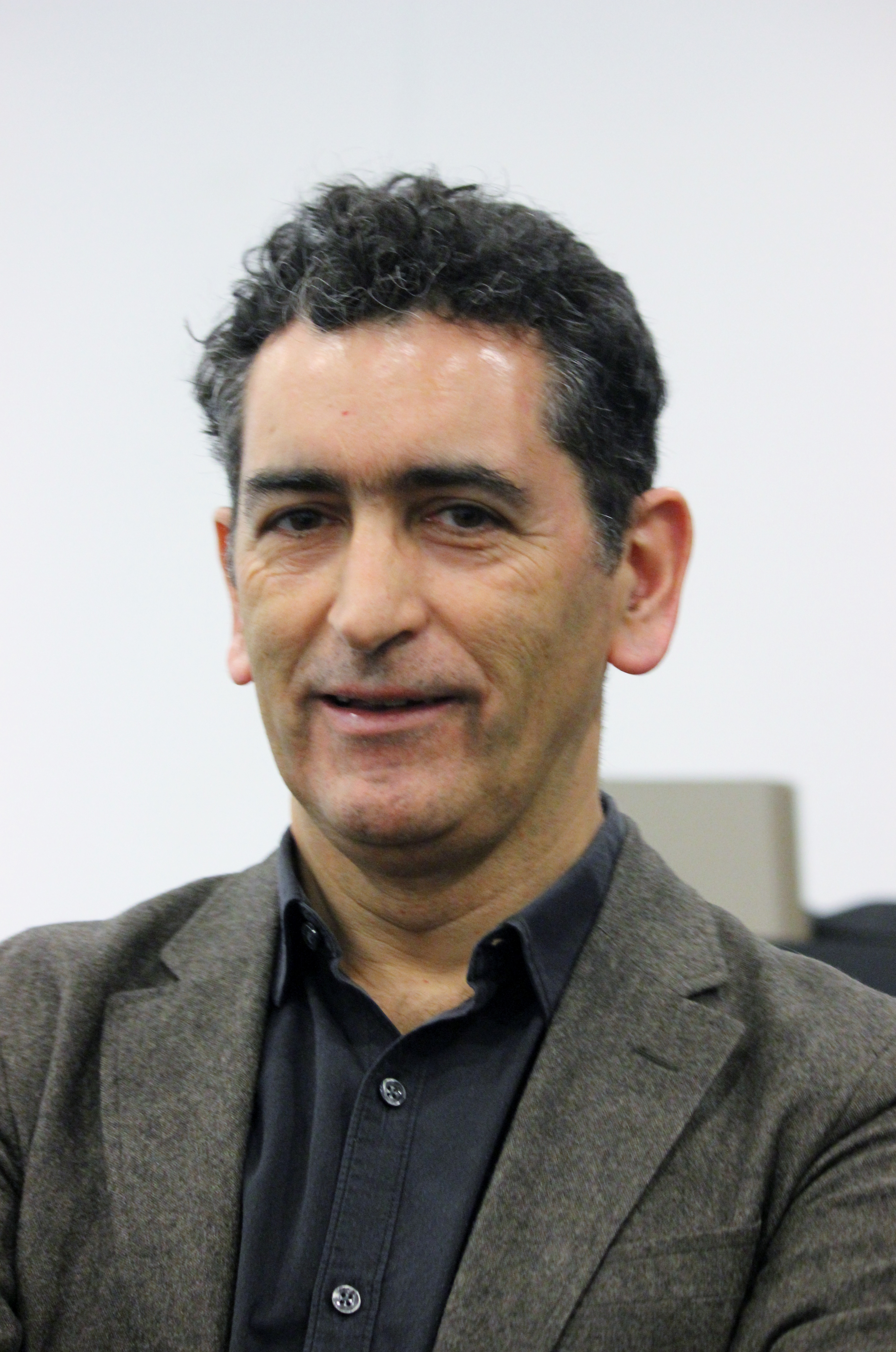
- Born: Juan Antonio Mayorga Ruano; 6 April 1965 (age 61); Madrid, Spain
- Occupation: Writer
- Writing career
- Language: Spanish

Seat M of the Real Academia Española
- Incumbent
- Assumed office 19 May 2019 (Note: Elected on 12 April 2018)
- Preceded by: Carlos Bousoño

Juan Antonio Mayorga Ruano (born 1965 in Madrid) is a Spanish dramatist. He is best known in English-speaking countries for his 2004 play Himmelweg (Way to Heaven), which was brought to the London stage in June 2017 as part of the Festival of Spanish Theatre in London (Festelón).

== Biography ==
Mayorga was born on April 6, 1965, and grew up in the Madrid neighborhood of Chamberí. Mayorga studied as a research fellow at the Institute of Philosophy of the Spanish National Research Council under the direction of the philosopher Reyes Mate, before furthering his studies in Münster, Berlin and Paris. He received a PhD in Philosophy in 1997 from the National University of Distance Education.

On April 12, 2018, he was elected a member of the Language Academy to occupy chair "M," which had been vacant since the death of poet and linguist Carlos Bousoño on October 24, 2015. Philologist Dolores Corbella was also a candidate for that chair. Mayorga's candidacy was supported by academics Luis María Ansón, Luis Mateo Díez, and José Manuel Sánchez Ron.

== Works ==
His 2015 play Reykjavík involves a recreation of the World Chess Championship 1972 which took place in the Icelandic capital between Boris Spassky and Bobby Fischer. It has been adapted for radio and was broadcast on BBC Radio 3 in 2023.

His plays include:

- Siete hombres buenos (1989)
- Más ceniza, Calderón de la Barca Award winner 1992 (1993).
- El traductor de Blumemberg (1993)
- El sueño de Ginebra (1993)
- Concierto fatal de la viuda Kolakowski (1994).
- El hombre de oro (1996)
- Cartas de amor a Stalin (1997)
- El jardín quemado (1999)
- Angelus Novus (1999)
- El Gordo y el Flaco (2001)
- Alejandro y Ana (en colaboración con Juan Cavestany) (2002).
- Sonámbulo (2003)
- Palabra de perro (2003)
- Himmelweg. Camino del cielo (2003).
- Animales nocturnos (2003)
- Últimas palabras de Copito de Nieve (2004)
- Hamelin (2005)
- Job (2006)
- El chico de la última fila (2006)
- Fedra (2007)
- La paz perpetua (2007)
- Primera noticia de la catástrofe (2007)
- La tortuga de Darwin (2008)
- El cartógrafo (2009)
- Los yugoslavos (2010)
- El elefante ha ocupado la catedral (2011)
- La lengua en pedazos (2011)
- El crítico (Si supiera cantar, me salvaría) (2012)
- Penumbra (with Juan Cavestany)
- El arte de la entrevista (2014)
- Famélica (2014)
- Reikiavik (2015), about the duel between Boris Spassky and Bobby Fischer.
- Amistad (2017)
- El mago (2017)
- La intérprete (2018)
- Intensamente azules (2018).
- Shock 1 (el cóndor y el puma) (2020) (with Juan Cavestany, Albert Boronat, and Andés Lima).
- Shock 2 (la tormenta y la guerra) (2021) (with Juan Cavestany, Albert Boronat, and Andés Lima).
- Silencio (2022), based on his acceptance speech at the Royal Spanish Academy.
- El Golem (2022)
- María Luisa (2023)
- La colección (2024)

== Awards and recognition ==
In 2013, he won the National Dramatic Literature Award of Spain, with his play La lengua en pedazos.

In 2016, he was awarded the XIII Europe Prize Theatrical Realities, in Craiova, with the following motivation:

Mayorga is a playwright. His work has crossed national boundaries to become established in major European theatres. A regular collaborator with theatre companies such as Animalario, he has also worked as an adaptor and dramatist for the Centro Dramático Nacional and the Compañía Nacional de Teatro Clasíco. When Mayorga writes his plays he “hears” the reaction of the audience. His plays question the audience, inviting them to adopt a position. The reader/spectator is always asked to “re-create” the meaning (or a meaning) of what happens on stage. This is not a provocation by the author but the audience’s judgement surfacing as the play unfolds. His plays have been shown in 18 countries and translated into 16 languages.

He won the 2022 Princess of Asturias Award for Literature.

== Personal life ==
Mayorga is married and has three children.
