= Diccionario panhispánico del español jurídico =

Legal spanish dictionary

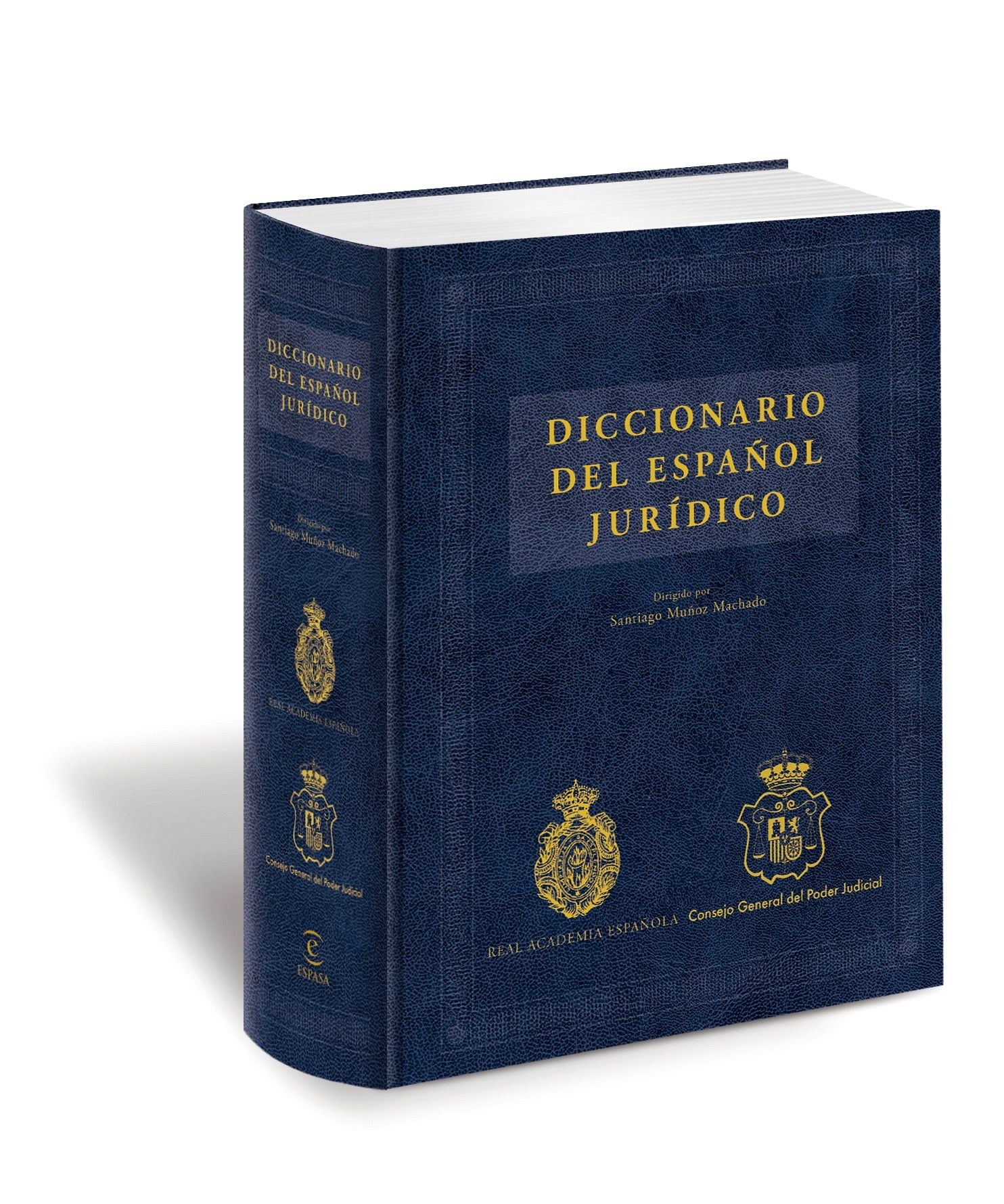
- Author: Royal Spanish Academy
- Publication date: 2017
- ISBN: 9788468042916

Diccionario panhispánico del español jurídico (DPEJ; English: Pan-Hispanic Dictionary of Legal Spanish) is a legal Spanish dictionary made by Royal Spanish Academy in collaboration with the General Council of the Judiciary (CGPJ).
