= Don Juan (novel) =

1963 novel by Gonzalo Torrente Ballester

- Author: Gonzalo Torrente Ballester
- Language: Spanish
- Publisher: Ediciones Destino
- Publication date: 1963
- Publication place: Spain
- Pages: 335

Don Juan is a 1963 novel by the Spanish writer Gonzalo Torrente Ballester. It is about the seducer Don Juan and his attitude, which is portrayed as a rebellion against God. Torrente Ballester had a long interest in the Don Juan legend and the theories about its origin. He planned his Don Juan as a play, but the project evolved into a novel.
