= Los gozos y las sombras =

Series of novels by Gonzalo Torrente Ballester

- El señor llega; Donde da la vuelta el aire; La pascua triste
- Author: Gonzalo Torrente Ballester
- Country: Spain
- Language: Spanish
- Publisher: Arión
- Published: 1957–1962

Los gozos y las sombras (lit. 'The joys and the shadows') is a trilogy of novels by the Spanish writer Gonzalo Torrente Ballester. It consists of El señor llega (1957, lit. 'The lord arrives'), Donde da la vuelta el aire (1960, lit. 'Where the air turns') and La pascua triste (1962, lit. 'The sad Easter'). It is set in a Galician fishing town before the Spanish Civil War and revolves around the conflicts between an aristocratic order and increasing economic rule. It is considered a major work of Spanish 20th-century literature.

El señor llega received the novel prize of the Fundación Juan March. The trilogy was the basis for the 1982 television series Los gozos y las sombras, produced by Televisión Española.

== Plot ==
In The Joys and the Shadows, the author tells a story set in Pueblanueva del Conde during the two years immediately preceding the outbreak of the Spanish Civil War. In this fictional fishing town on the Galician coast, everything is unsettled by the return of Carlos Deza, the last of the Churruchaos, the former lords of the town. Following the failure of his romantic relationship and a lack of motivation in his work as a psychiatrist in Vienna, Carlos is prompted by a dream to return to his hometown for an indefinite period. From the outset, he receives the support and friendship of Doña Mariana, known as "the Old Woman" (who also belongs to the Churruchao family), who sees him as a valuable ally in her struggle against the town's cacique and nouveau riche, Cayetano Salgado.

Carlos is initially reluctant to become involved in the conflict between Doña Mariana and Cayetano, but he becomes increasingly drawn into a relentless struggle that extends from the social and economic spheres to intense romantic passions. It is a confrontation between the old and new forms of power: the hereditary nobility represented by Doña Mariana and the new "plebeian" elite that controls the means of economic production, represented by Cayetano Salgado. The growing trade union and republican agitation is represented by Juan Aldán, a member of the Churruchao family who has fallen into poverty and become resentful. He attempts to create a trade-union alliance between Doña Mariana's fishermen and the employees of Cayetano's shipyard.

Following Doña Mariana's death, events take a dramatic turn. The unusual will left by "the Old Woman" places Carlos Deza in the position of administering all her wealth and property for five years, with complete freedom of action. After this five-year period, Germaine, the deceased woman's niece and universal heir, will be able to take possession of the inheritance. The estate includes fishing boats, for which Juan Aldán has ambitious trade-union plans, as well as the possibility of a marriage between Carlos and Germaine that Doña Mariana had contemplated, although it never takes place.

Germaine, entirely devoted to her passion for opera and to caring for her sick father, returns to Paris as soon as possible with a substantial advance on her inheritance. She has little interest in either the town or life there, and her relationship with Carlos Deza never becomes entirely cordial. Carlos eventually also leaves the town as social tensions on the eve of the Spanish Civil War become increasingly dangerous. He takes with him Clara Aldán, Juan's younger sister, who has been brutally assaulted by Cayetano and now requires his care and support.
