= Maurin =

Maurin is a surname, and may refer to:

- Antoine Maurin (1771–1830), French cavalry commander.
- Antoine Maurin (1793–1860), French lithographer.
- Charles Maurin (1856–1914), French painter, engraver, and an anarchist.
- Evans Maurin (born 2001), French footballer.
- Joaquín Maurín (1896–1973), Spanish Communist politician.
- José Manuel García Maurin (born 1997), Spanish soccer player.
- Julien Maurin (born 1985), French rally driver.
- Louis Maurin (1869–1956), French army general who was twice Minister of War.
- Louis-Joseph Maurin (1859–1936), Roman Catholic Cardinal and Archbishop of Lyon.
- Mado Maurin (1915–2013), French stage actress.
- Patrick Maurin (1947–1982), former stage name of French actor Patrick Dewaere.
- Peter Maurin (1877–1949), French Catholic social activist.
- Rene Maurin (born 1971), Slovene theatre director, film director and screenwriter.
- Ty Maurin (born 1982), former American soccer player.
