= Filomeno, a mi pesar =

1988 novel by Gonzalo Torrente Ballester

- Author: Gonzalo Torrente Ballester
- Language: Spanish
- Publisher: Editorial Planeta
- Publication date: 1988
- Publication place: Spain
- Pages: 442
- ISBN: 8432068012

Filomeno, a mi pesar: memorias de un señorito descolocado (Spanish: Filomeno, to my dismay: memories of a misplaced young man) is a 1988 novel by the Spanish writer Gonzalo Torrente Ballester. It is about the life of the upper-class Galician Filomeno Freijomil, who is followed from childhood and into adulthood, simultaneously tracing Spanish and European society during the interwar era and the early Francoist period.

The book received the 1988 Premio Planeta de Novela.
