= The King Amaz'd =

1989 novel by Gonzalo Torrente Ballester

- Author: Gonzalo Torrente Ballester
- Original title: Crónica del rey pasmado
- Translator: Colin Smith
- Language: Spanish
- Publisher: Editorial Planeta
- Publication date: 1989
- Publication place: Spain
- English publication date: 1996
- Pages: 230
- ISBN: 8432068209

The King Amaz'd: A Chronicle (Spanish: Crónica del rey pasmado) is a 1989 novel by the Spanish writer Gonzalo Torrente Ballester. It is set at a 17th-century Spanish court, suggested to be that of Philip IV, and portrays the scandal that ensues when the king expresses the desire to see his wife naked. The book was published in English in 1996, translated by Colin Smith.

It was adapted into the 1991 film The Dumbfounded King directed by Imanol Uribe.
