= Rene Maurin =

Slovene theatre and film director (born 1971)

- Born: 2 January 1971 (age 55); Maribor, Slovenia
- Occupations: Theatre director, Film director, Screenwriter
- Years active: 1992–present
- Website: https://studiomaurin.com

Rene Maurin (born 1971, in Maribor, Slovenia) is a Slovene theatre director, film director and screenwriter.

== Biography ==
During his studies of architecture in Graz, Austria he became interested in theatre and film. Leaving architecture studies he enrolled the Academy of Drama Arts in Zagreb, Croatia, where he finishes the studies under the mentorship of Georgij Paro and Tomislav Durbešić. He graduated with the first staging of the play IT, by a young Slovene author Rok Vilčnik, which was awarded for the Best new Slovene play at the Week of Slovenian Drama in the year 2000.

After the graduation he focused primarily on documentary and semi-documentary film in the production of Radio-Television Slovenia. In 2001 he took over the artistic leadership of Ptuj City Theatre which he led until 2008. Notably, in his mandate the neoclassical theatre building was completely renovated after almost hundred years.

In 2015 he obtains a MA degree in film studies at the Academy of Theatre, Radio, Film and Television (Ljubljana), following the production of the short feature film Bright Black. As of 2012 he is a guest professor at the Institute for Media communication at University of Maribor in Slovenia and writes for several newspapers and magazines.

He lives in Maribor and Ljubljana, Slovenia and directs mostly in Slovenia and Croatia.

== Works ==
=== Theatre ===
- T. Kacarov, In Only a Day, Croatian National Theatre, Varaždin, Croatia
- Richard Tognetti, Nothing Project, Festival Maribor, Slovenia
- M. Krleža, Golgotha - Requiem for social justice, Theatre Virovitica, Croatia
- D. Harrower, Blackbird, Imaginarni in coproduction with Cankar Hall, Ljubljana, Slovenia
- P. A. C. de Beaumarchais, The Barber of Seville, Croatian National Theatre, Split, Croatia
- T. Williams, The Two Character Play, Ptuj City Theatre, Ptuj, Slovenia
- R. Maurin, General Maister, Protocol of Republic Slovenia, Lenart, Slovenia
- R. Vilčnik, A. T. Linhart Micka, Ptuj City Theatre, Ptuj, Slovenia
- P. Svetina The Walrus gets glasses, Maribor Puppet Theatre, Maribor, Slovenia
- S. Grum, The Event In Town of Goga, Croatian National Theatre, Osijek, Croatia
- P. Vogel, Desdemona, A Play about a Handkerchief, Croatian National Theatre, Osijek, Croatia
- A. Schnitzler, Café amoral (La Ronde), Ptuj City Theatre, Ptuj, Slovenia
- J. P. Sartre, No Exit, HKD Theatre, Rijeka, Croatia
- L. Hübner, Creeps, Ptuj City Theatre, Ptuj, Slovenia
- R. Vilčnik, Anteater or The Forest of Red Fruit, ITI Center, Motovun, Croatia
- group of authors, In My Shoes, First Stage, First Gymnasium, Maribor, Slovenia
- R. Vilčnik, TO, Slovene National Theatre, Maribor, Slovenia
- R. Maurin, Audiction, Intercontinental, Zagreb, Croatia
- F. Arrabal, The Tricycle, Academy of Drama Arts, Zagreb, Croatia
- H. Pinter, The Dumb Waiter, Academy of Drama Arts, Zagreb, Croatia
- H. Barker, Art for sale (The Possibilities), Academy of Drama Arts, Zagreb, Croatia

=== Film ===
- R. Maurin, Bright Black, short feature film, AGRFT Ljubljana
- G. Trušnovec, Caliber 0.46, Radio-Television Slovenia
- R. Maurin, G. Trušnovec Suma sumarum, Radio-Television Slovenia
- R. Maurin, S. Pečovnik, Life As From Inside, Radio-Television Slovenia
- R. Maurin, I Saw Elvis!, Radio-Television Slovenia
- R. Maurin, JUNKARt, Radio-Television Slovenia

=== Radio ===
- J. Sigsgard, Robin Hood, a cartoon for the ears, Croatian Radio Television, Zagreb, Croatia
- W. Bauer, Dreamjockey, Croatian Radio Television, Zagreb, Croatia

=== Translations ===
- T. Williams, The Two Character Play
- A. Ayckbourn, Callisto #7

== Awards ==
- Prešern Prize, University of Ljubljana
- Golden Laugh, 31st International Days of Satire, Zagreb, Croatia
- Prix Fabijan Šovagović, 13th Actors Festival, Vinkovci, Croatia
- Golden Lion, 6th International International Festival of Small Stages (in Croatian and Italian), Umag, Croatia
- Golden Laugh, 29th International Days of Satire, Zagreb, Croatia
