= Mozoncillo =

- Municipality
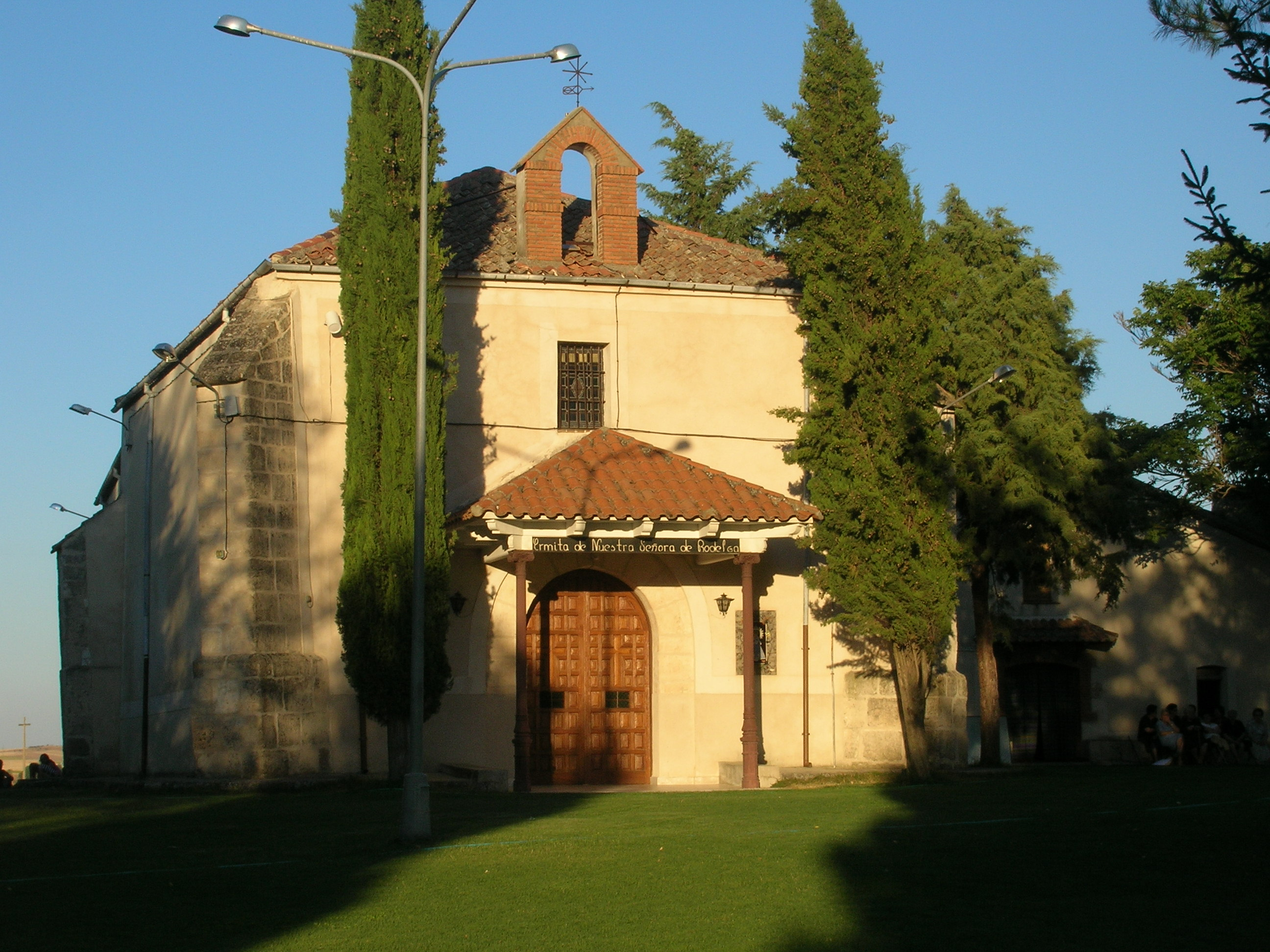

- Flag Coat of arms
- Nickname: Hermitage of Nuestra Señora de Rodelga.
- Location in Spain. Mozoncillo (Spain)
- Coordinates: 41°08′52″N 4°11′10″W
- Country: Spain
- Autonomous community: Castile and León
- Province: Segovia
- Municipality: Mozoncillo

Area
  - Total: 42 km^{2} (16 sq mi)

Population (2025-01-01)
  - Total: 916
  - Density: 22/km^{2} (56/sq mi)
- Time zone: UTC+1 (CET)
  - Summer (DST): UTC+2 (CEST)
- Website: Official website

Mozoncillo is a municipality located in the province of Segovia, Castile and León, Spain. According to the 2004 census (INE), the municipality has a population of 1,014 inhabitants.
