= Ignacio Bosque =

Spanish linguist

The Most Excellent Ignacio Bosque
- Born: José Ignacio Bosque Muñoz; 6 August 1951 (age 75); Hellín (Albacete), Spain

Seat t of the Real Academia Española
- Incumbent
- Assumed office 1 June 1997 (Note: Elected on 4 May 1995)
- Preceded by: Seat established

José Ignacio Bosque Muñoz (Hellín, Albacete, 6 August 1951) is a Spanish linguist. He is a professor of Spanish Philology at the Complutense University of Madrid; a position he has held since 1982. He has been a visiting professor at the University of Utrecht, Ohio State University, the University of Leuven, Sophia University and the University of Minnesota.

== Career ==
He attended the Autonomous University of Madrid, where he was a student of Fernando Lázaro Carreter. He also studied semantics and pragmatics at Berkeley from 1974-1975. He is an expert on the Spanish language, from the standpoints of both traditional and generative grammar, and has given special attention to the relationship between vocabulary and syntax.

In 1999, together with Violeta Demonte, he published the Gramática Descriptiva de la Lengua Española, in three volumes. It is the most detailed work on the syntax and morphology of the Spanish language published to date. He was also the coordinator for the Nueva Gramática de la Lengua Española, published in 2009; the first such academic grammar since 1931.

== Honors and awards ==
- Doctor Honoris Causa at the University of Alicante, the National University of Córdoba, the University of El Salvador and the American University of Nicaragua.
- Elected to Seat t of the Real Academia Española on 4 May 1995, took up his seat on 1 June 1997.
- Elected to the Academy of Europe (2011)
- Awarded the Alfonso Reyes International Prize (2012).

His work related to proverbs has been the subject of a scholarly study.

== Selected works ==
- Sobre la Negación, Catedra (1980) ISBN 84-376-0251-3
- Problemas de Morfosintaxis, Universidad Complutense (1980) ISBN 84-7491-010-2
- Las Categorías Gramaticales, Sintesis (1998) ISBN 84-7738-075-9
- REDES: Diccionario Combinatorio del Español Contemporaneo (editor), Ediciones SM (2005) ISBN 84-376-0251-3
