= Way to Heaven (play) =

Way To Heaven (German: Himmelweg) is a 2004 play by the award-winning Spanish playwright Juan Mayorga.

The play is about a notorious incident in 1944 in which a delegation from the International Red Cross visited the Theresienstadt concentration camp. What they saw was a model cleaned up for their visit, and they were duped by the Nazi camp officials into reporting to the world that conditions were good, and that they saw no evidence to support reports of mass murder.

== Plot summary ==
According to The New York Times review of the 2009 production in New York, the play has five sections. It opens with a monologue by the Red Cross inspector. Next a series of tableaux are shown that had been directed by the Nazis, such as a small girl at play teaching her doll to swim. In the third scene, the camp commandant receives the Red Cross visitor (in the event, a commission of several members had visited.) "The world", the commandant tells the Red Cross representative, "is moving toward unity".

The commandant forces a Jewish prisoner named Gershom Gottfried into producing an opera for the Red Cross visitors. In the final scene, Gottfried urges his players to "focus on their words and gestures," to perform this piece. He knows they have to ignore the daily trains taking prisoners from Theresienstadt to what the audience knows and the prisoners fear are death camps. "If we do it well", he tells a frightened young performer, "we'll see Mummy again, on one of those trains."

== Response ==
The Independent calls Way to Heaven "a compelling, cunningly constructed play".

nytheatre.com called Way to Heaven "extremely intelligent and surprisingly evenhanded" in its treatment of the Nazi perpetrators, Red Cross commissioners, and Jewish victims.

The New York Times calls it a "spare, elegant work".

== Production history ==
The play premiered at Málaga's Teatro Alameda in 2003; in 2004, it was performed at Madrid's Teatro María Guerrero. Translated to English, it was played at London's Royal Court Theatre in 2005. The play has been produced world-wide, including Dublin, Oslo, Paris, Buenos Aires, Brussels, New York, Los Angeles, Melbourne and, most recently, Winnipeg, Manitoba, Canada, Athens, Greece, Seoul and Barcelona.

When the play opened in New York in 2009, the New York Times review noted that it had been "a hit in Europe and South America." It was produced in the U.S. by Burning Coal Theatre Company in 2009, and in New York City that year by Equilicuá Producciones. In the 2010–2011 season, it was co-produced off-Broadway by Equilicuá Producciones and Repertorio Español, and at the REP at University of Delaware in 2011. All the US productions were directed by Matthew Earnest.

In 2017, the play was brought to the London stage as part of the Festival of Spanish Theatre in London (Festelón).

== Historical references ==
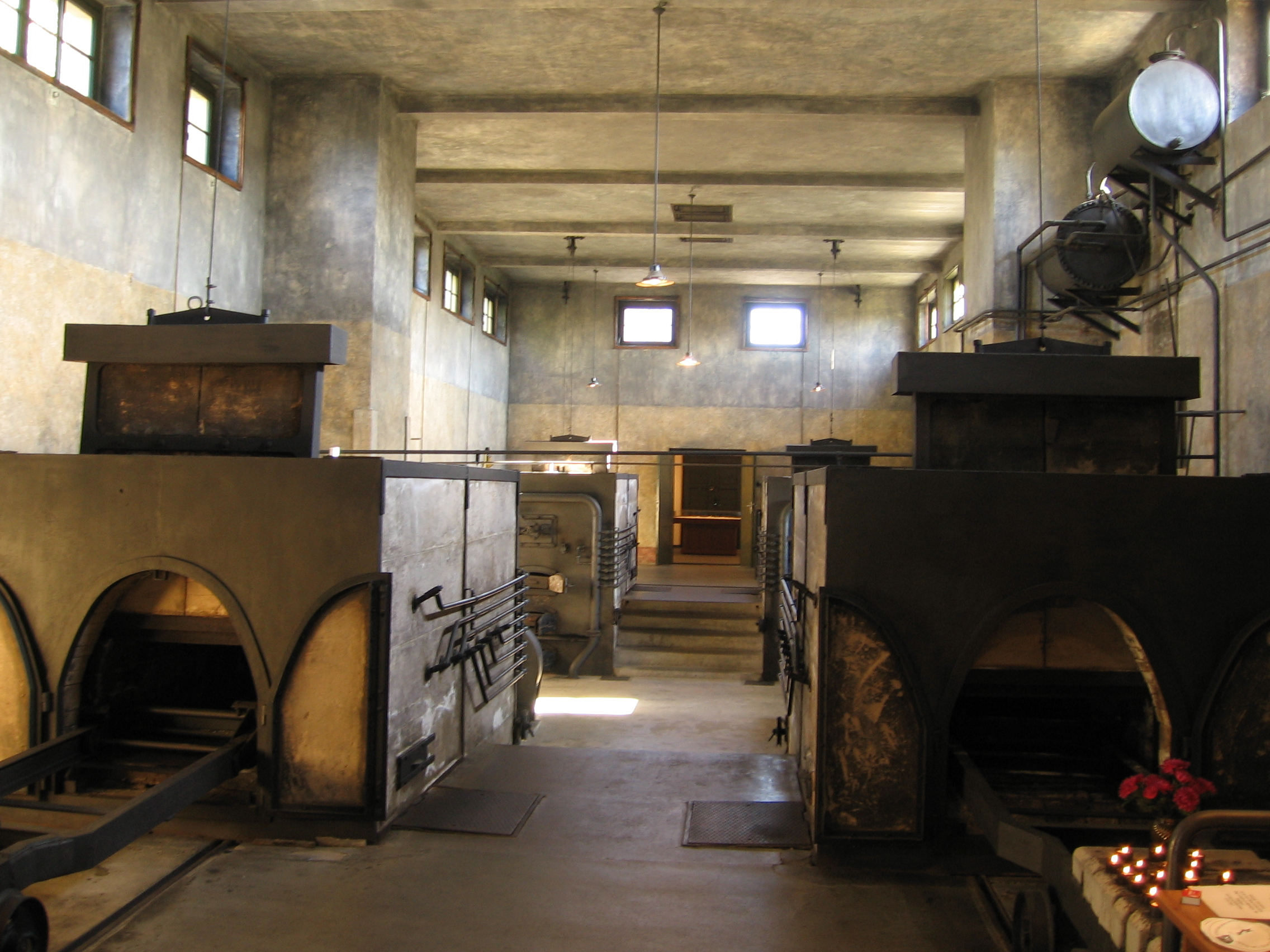
Theresienstadt Crematorium

The Theresienstadt Ghetto had a Children's Opera, composed of Jewish children transported to the concentration camp from an orphanage in Prague. They performed Brundibár, written by an inmate, for the Red Cross commissioners.

The Germans agreed to admit the Red Cross Commission to Theresienstadt only under pressure from the government of Denmark following the invasion of Normandy. The Danish king had demanded that the Red Cross investigate reports that its deported Jewish citizens were being murdered. The Germans stalled before agreeing to permit the visit; they wanted to ensure the continued cooperation of Danish subjects working in war production factories, as they still occupied Denmark and had pressed many residents into labor. Shortly before the visit, the Nazis deported 7,503 people to the Auschwitz concentration camp to eliminate overcrowding. Theresienstadt was cleaned up and staged as a model community. The Red Cross visitors saw newly planted flower gardens and freshly painted houses.

By 1944, the visit to Theresienstadt was only one piece of an accumulating body of information on The Holocaust which the Red Cross learned. Historians consider it significant that the Red Cross' 15-page report on Theresienstadt failed to raise the question of whether mass murder was taking place in Nazi-occupied Europe.

The word Himmelweg (German for path or way to Heaven) was the term used alternately with schlauch (German for hose or tube) at the Nazi death camps to denote the path into the gas chambers.
