= Violeta Demonte =

Linguist

- Born: 27 June 1944 (age 82); Paraná, Argentina
- Occupation: Linguist

Academic background
- Education: Indiana University
- Influences: Fernando Lázaro Carreter, Noam Chomsky

Academic work
- Institutions: Autonomous University of Madrid
- Main interests: Syntax, Semantics, Argument structure

Violeta Demonte (born 27 June 1944 in Paraná, Argentina) is a linguist known for her work on the grammar of Spanish. She is emeritus professor of Spanish language at the Autonomous University of Madrid.

== Education and career ==
Demonte studied at the University of Buenos Aires, at Indiana University, and at the Autonomous University of Madrid, where she received her doctorate in 1975; her doctoral supervisor was Fernando Lázaro Carreter. She subsequently spent her entire career at the Autonomous University of Madrid, first as lecturer, then as full professor from 1988 until her retirement in 2014. She has held visiting positions at the University of Minnesota (1988) and El Colegio de México (1989), as well as at the University of Buenos Aires, the National University of Comahue (Argentina), the Charles University in Prague, the Pontifical Catholic University of Valparaíso (Chile), Utrecht University, the University of Southern California and MIT. From 2004 to 2007 she served as Director General for Research at the Spanish Ministry for Education and Science.

== Honours and awards ==
In 2007 Demonte was appointed Commander with Plaque of the Civil Order of Alfonso X, the Wise. In 2014 she received the Ramón Menéndez Pidal National Research Prize in the humanities. In 2015 she was elected corresponding member of the Royal Spanish Academy. In 2022 she was the recipient of an honorary doctorate from the University of Alcalá. In 2023 she was elected ordinary member of the Academia Europaea.

== Research ==
Demonte's research interests are in Spanish grammar, the foundations and methodology of linguistic theory, lexical theory and the lexicon/syntax interface, and the syntax-semantics-pragmatics interface. Her work can be situated in the traditions of both linguistic description and generative grammar.

In 1999, together with Ignacio Bosque, she published the Gramática Descriptiva de la Lengua Española in three volumes; this is the most detailed descriptive work on the syntax and morphology of the Spanish language published to date.

== Selected publications ==
- Demonte, Violeta. 1989. Teoría sintáctica: de las estructuras a la rección (Syntactic theory: from structures to government). Madrid: Synthesis. ISBN 9788477380740
- Demonte, Violeta. 1995. Dative alternation in Spanish. Probus 7, 5–30. doi:10.1515/prbs.1995.7.1.5
- Bosque, Ignacio, & Violeta Demonte. 1999. Gramática descriptiva de la lengua española (Descriptive grammar of the Spanish language). 3 volumes. Madrid: Espasa-Calpe. ISBN 9788423979189
- Bosque, Ignacio, & Violeta Demonte. 2009. Nueva gramática de la lengua española (New grammar of the Spanish language). Madrid: Espasa-Calpe. ISBN 9788467032079
- Demonte, Violeta, & Olga Fernández-Soriano. 2009. Force and finiteness in the Spanish complementizer system. Probus 21, 23–49. doi:10.1515/prbs.2009.002
