= Gonzalo Torrente Ballester =

Spanish Galician writer

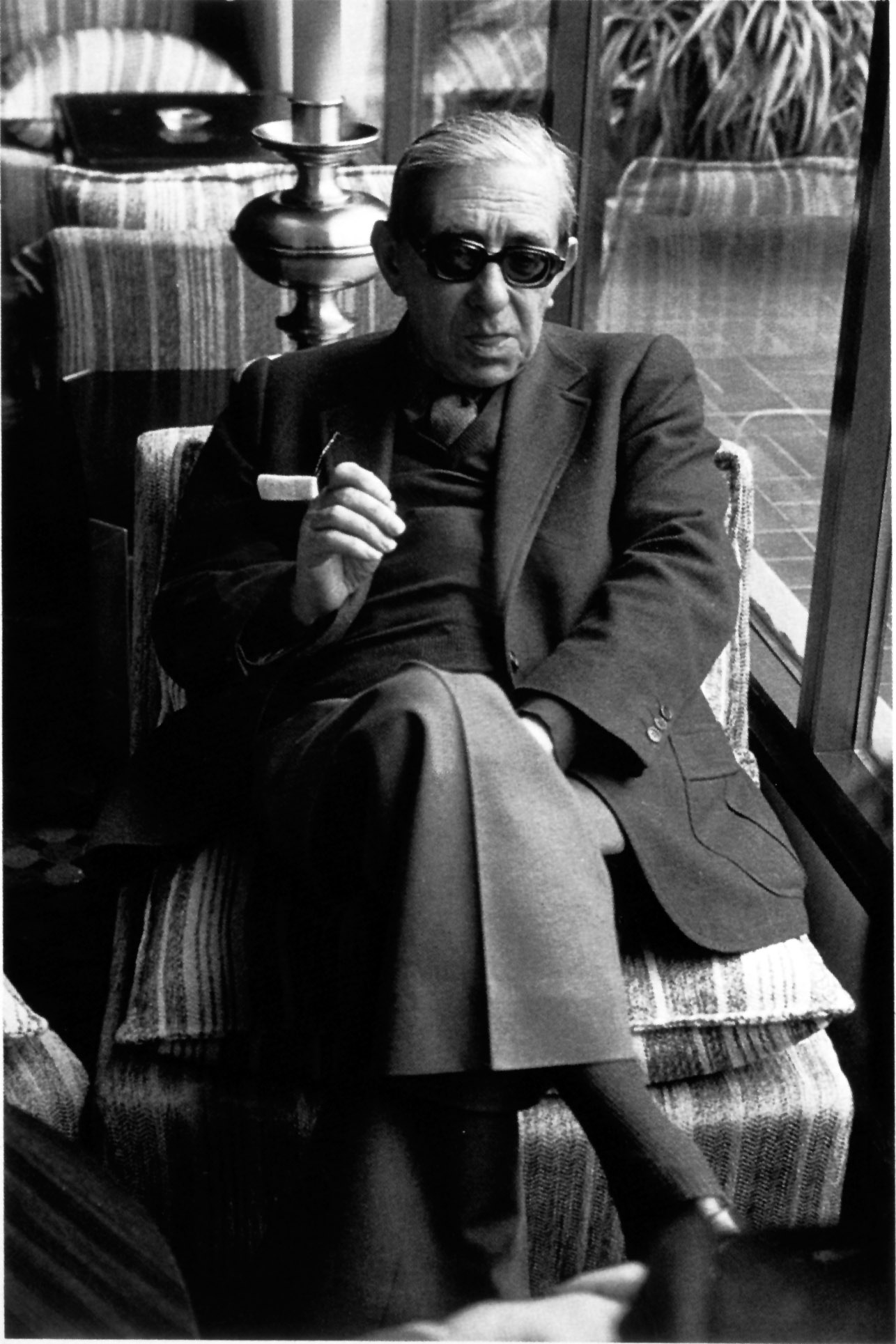
- Photograph by Elisa Cabot (1982)
- Born: 13 June 1910; Ferrol (A Coruña), Spain
- Died: 27 January 1999 (aged 88); Salamanca, Spain
- Occupations: Writer, novelist
- Writing career
- Notable works: Los gozos y las sombras Don Juan

Seat E of the Real Academia Española
- In office 27 May 1977 – 27 January 1999
- Preceded by: Juan Ignacio Luca de Tena
- Succeeded by: Carmen Iglesias

Gonzalo Torrente Ballester (13 June 1910 – 27 January 1999) was a Spanish writer associated with the Generation of '36 movement.

== Life ==
He was born in Serantes, Ferrol, Galicia, and received his first education there, subsequently attending the universities of Santiago de Compostela and Oviedo.

Although primarily a novelist, he also published journalism, essays, and plays. His career as a writer began in Oviedo, but developed largely in Madrid.

Before the outbreak of the Spanish civil war, he traveled to Paris with the intention of writing his doctoral thesis and there he was surprised by the coup d'etat of July 18, 1936. After hesitating, he returned to Spain in October to be with his family. From the bus that was taking him home, he saw the bodies of victims of the repression in the ditches. His father exclaimed by way of greeting: "Don't you know that many of your friends have been shot?". He followed the recommendation of a priest he trusted and joined the Falange. His first novel, Javier Mariño, appeared in 1943, and he continued to publish novels almost until his death, receiving major prizes for some of them.

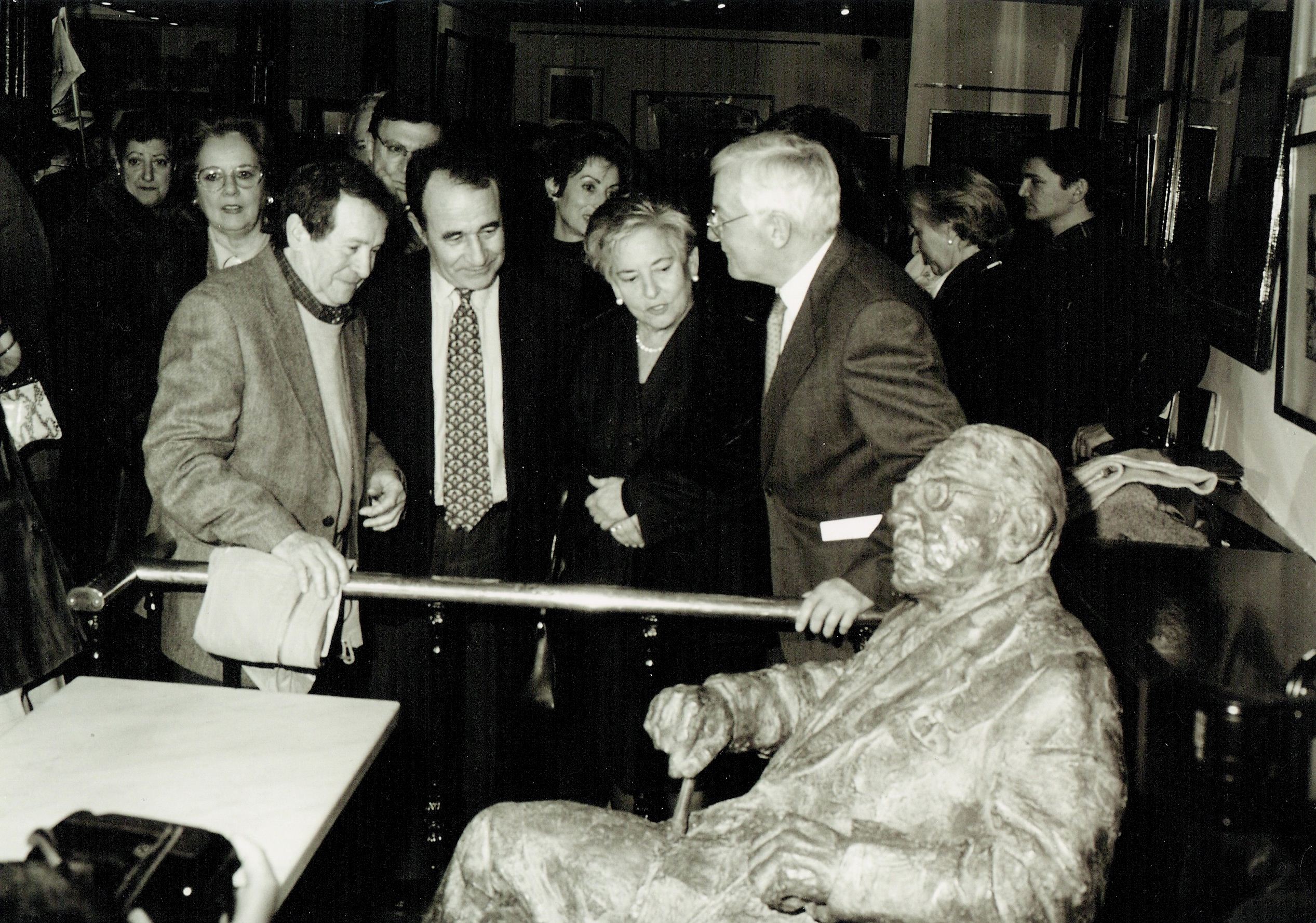
The Presentation of a sculpture in honour of Torrente, at the Café Novelty, in Salamanca in 2000. From right to left, the director of The Royal Spanish Academy, Víctor García de la Concha,Torrente's widow, Fernanda, the author Carlos Casares and the sculptor Fernando Mayoral.

Despite his affiliation to the Falangists, from 1939, when he returned to Santiago to take up a university post, he increasingly distanced himself from the party. He joined in protests in favour of striking Asturian miners in 1962, and was expelled from his teaching post at the university as a result. In the mid-1960s he had a number of problems with government censors.

He left Spain for a post at the University at Albany, State University of New York in 1966, and remained there until 1973 as the university's first distinguished professor. In 1975 he moved to the city of Salamanca, where he remained until his death. After his return to Spain, he was increasingly celebrated: he was elected to seat E of the Real Academia Española, which he took up on 27 May 1977, and was awarded the premier Spanish literary prize, the Cervantes Prize, in 1985.

Immediately after his death, the Fundación Gonzalo Torrente Ballester was set up to protect, study and disseminate his work.

== List of novels ==
- Javier Mariño (1943)
- El golpe de estado de Guadalupe Limón (1946)
- Ifigenia (1950)
- Los gozos y las sombras: El Señor llega (1957) - , Donde da la vuelta el aire (1960), La Pascua triste (1962). Novel prize of the Fundación Juan March
- Don Juan (1963)
- Off-Side (1968)
- La saga/fuga de J. B. (1972) - Critics' Prize and City of Barcelona Prize
- Fragmentos de Apocalipsis (1977)
- La isla de los jacintos cortados (1980) - National Literature Prize
- Dafne y ensueños (1982)
- Quizá nos lleve el viento al infinito (1984)
- La princesa durmiente va a la escuela (1985)
- La rosa de los vientos (1985)
- Yo no soy yo, evidentemente (1987)
- Filomeno, a mi pesar (1988) - Planeta Prize
- Crónica del rey pasmado (1989)
- Las islas extraordinarias (1991)
- La muerte del decano (1992)
- La novela de Pepe Ansúrez (1994)
- La boda de Chon Recalde (1995)
- Los años indecisos (1997)
- Doménica (1999)

== Screenplays ==
- Night Arrival (1949)
- Surcos (1951)
- Devil's Roundup (1952)
- Rebellion (1954)

== See also ==
- University of Santiago de Compostela
