= Royal Spanish Academy =

Official regulator for the Spanish language

- Real Academia Española (Spanish)
- Arms of the Royal Spanish Academy

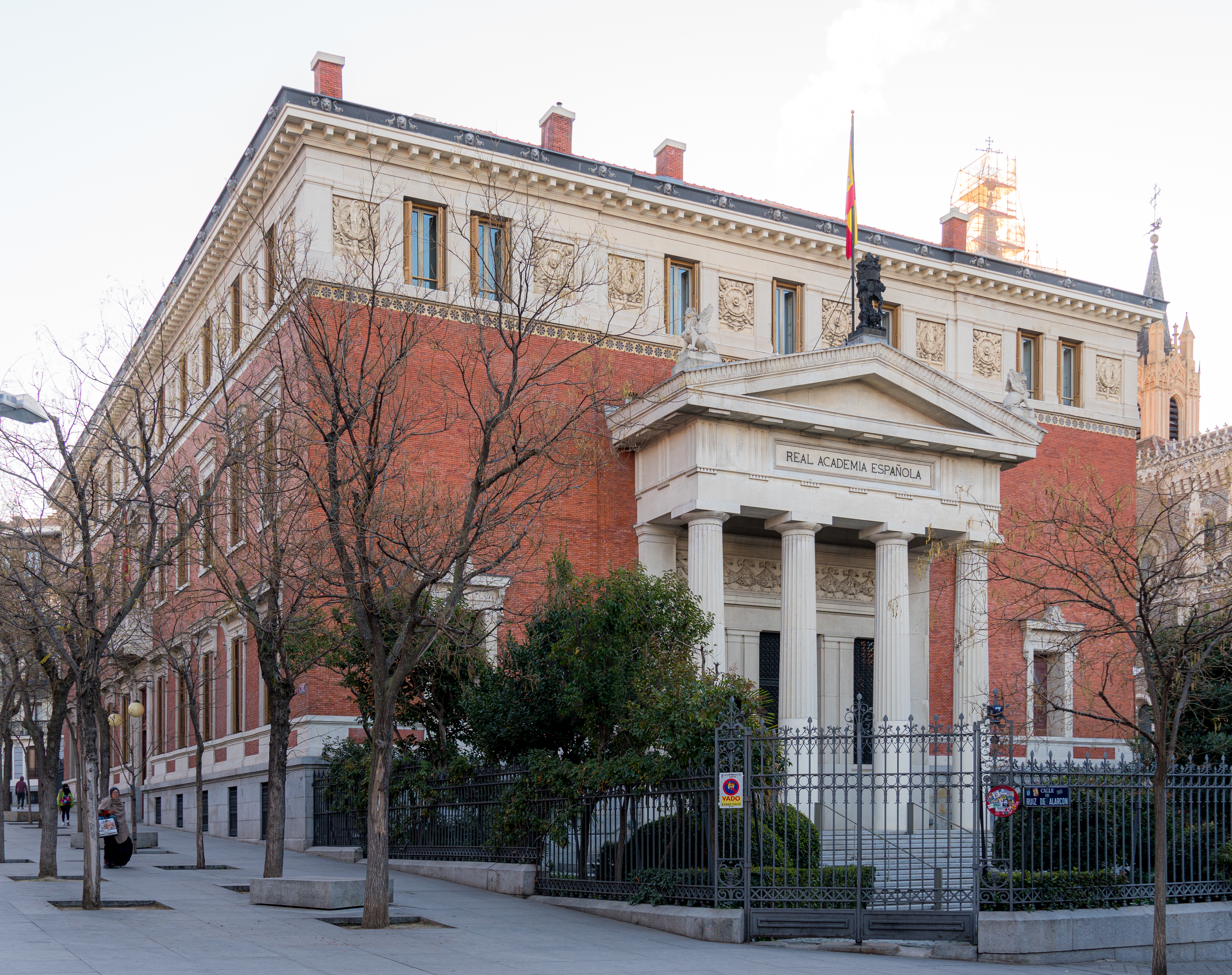
- Headquarters of the Royal Spanish Academy on Felipe IV Street, 4, in the Jerónimos neighborhood of Madrid
- Abbreviation: RAE
- Formation: 1713; 313 years ago
- Founder: The Duke of Escalona
- Headquarters: Madrid, Spain
- Region served: Hispanophone regions and populations
- Official language: Spanish
- Protector: Felipe VI (as King of Spain)
- Director: Santiago Muñoz Machado
- Main organ: Governing Board
- Affiliations: Association of Academies of the Spanish Language
- Website: www.rae.es (in Spanish)

The Royal Spanish Academy (Spanish: Real Academia Española, pronounced [reˈal akaˈðemja espaˈɲola]; RAE) is Spain's official royal institution with a mission to ensure the stability of the Spanish language. This is the official language regulating organ of Spain. It is based in Madrid, Spain, and is affiliated with national language academies in 22 other Hispanophone nations through the Association of Academies of the Spanish Language.

The RAE dedicates itself to language planning by applying linguistic prescription aimed at promoting linguistic unity within and between various territories, to ensure a common standard. The proposed language guidelines are shown in a number of works.

== History ==
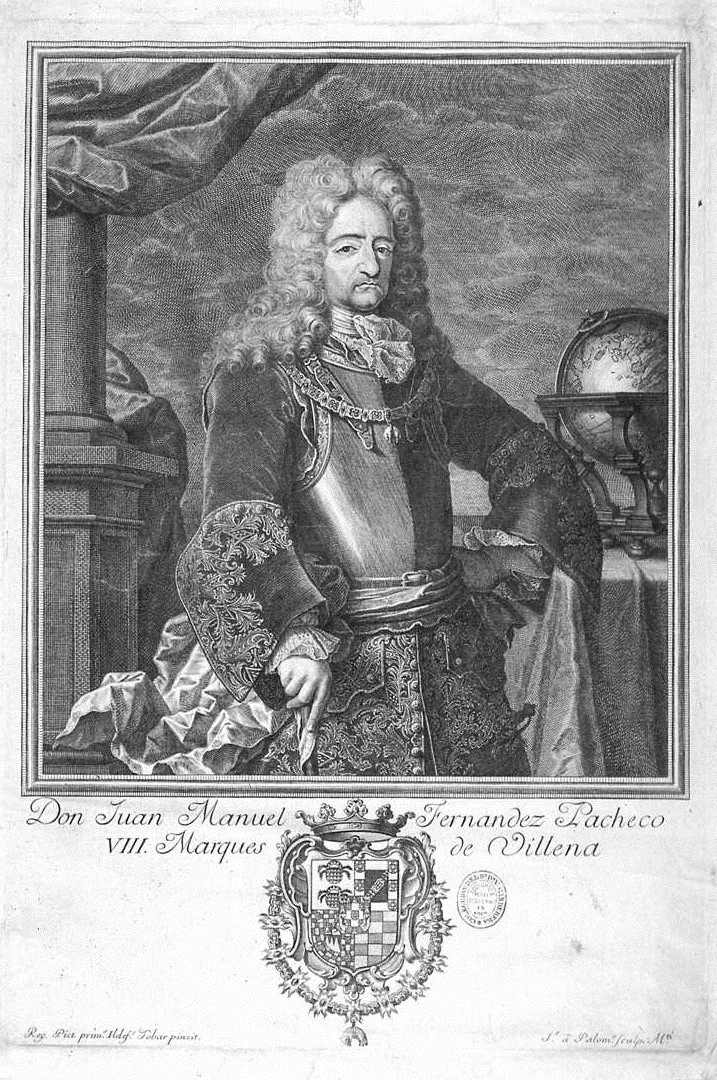
Juan Manuel Fernández Pacheco, Marquis of Villena c. 1700.

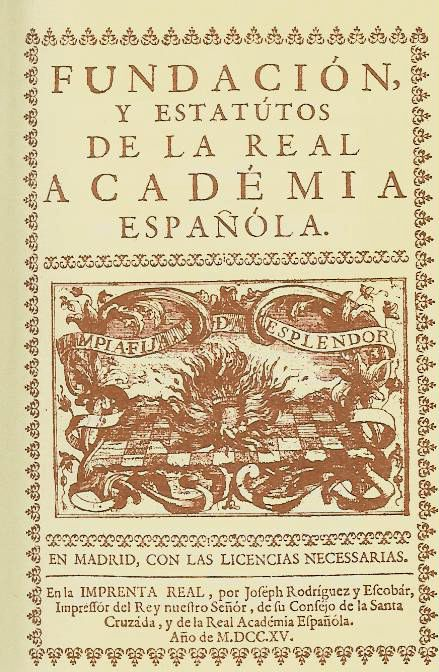
Title page of Fundación y estatútos de la Real Académia Españóla (Foundation and statutes of the Royal Spanish Academy) (1715).

In 1711, Spain, unlike France, Italy and Portugal, did not have a large dictionary with a comprehensive and collegially elaborated lexicographical repertoire. The initial nucleus of the future Academy was formed that same year by the eight novatores who met in the library of the palace of Juan Manuel Fernández Pacheco, Duke of Escalona and Marquess of Villena, located in the Plaza de las Descalzas Reales in Madrid.

The Spanish Academy was founded in 3 August 1713 on the initiative of Pacheco, with the purpose of "fixing the voices and words of the Castilian language in their greatest propriety, elegance and purity". The objective was to fix the language in the state of fullness that it had reached during the 16th century and that had been consolidated in the 17th century.

The Italian Accademia della Crusca founded in 1582 and the Académie Française founded in 1635 were taken as models.

The first official session of the new corporation was held at the residence of Pacheco on 6 July 1713, an event that is recorded in the book of minutes, begun on 3 August 1713.

Its creation, with twenty-four elected members was approved on 3 October 1714 by Royal Decree of Philip V, that gave the academy the right to be called the "Royal Spanish Academy". This meant that the academicians enjoyed the preeminences and exemptions granted to the servants of the Royal Household. It had its first seat at number 26 Valverde Street, from where it moved to Alarcón Street, corner of Felipe IV, its definitive seat.

The emblem chosen was a fiery crucible placed on the fire, with the legend Limpia, fija y da esplendor ("cleans, fixes and gives splendor"). Collective utility became the main hallmark of the Spanish Academy, differentiating itself from other academies that had proliferated in the golden centuries and that were conceived as mere occasional literary gatherings.

The RAE began establishing rules for the orthography of Spanish beginning in 1741 with the first edition of the Ortographía (spelled Ortografía from the second edition onwards). The proposals of the Academy became the official norm in Spain by royal decree in 1844, and they were also gradually adopted by the Spanish-speaking countries in the Americas.

Several reforms were introduced in the Nuevas Normas de Prosodia y Ortografía (1959, New Norms of Prosody and Orthography). Since the establishment of the Association of Academies of the Spanish Language in 1951, the Spanish academy works in close consultation with the other Spanish language academies in its various works and projects. The 1999 Orthography was the first to be edited by the twenty two academies together. The current rules and practical recommendations on spelling are presented in the latest edition of the Ortografía (2010).

The headquarters, opened in 1894, is located at Calle Felipe IV, 4, in the ward of Jerónimos, next to the Museo del Prado. The Center for the Studies of the Royal Spanish Academy, opened in 2007, is located at Calle Serrano 187–189.

== Fundamentals ==
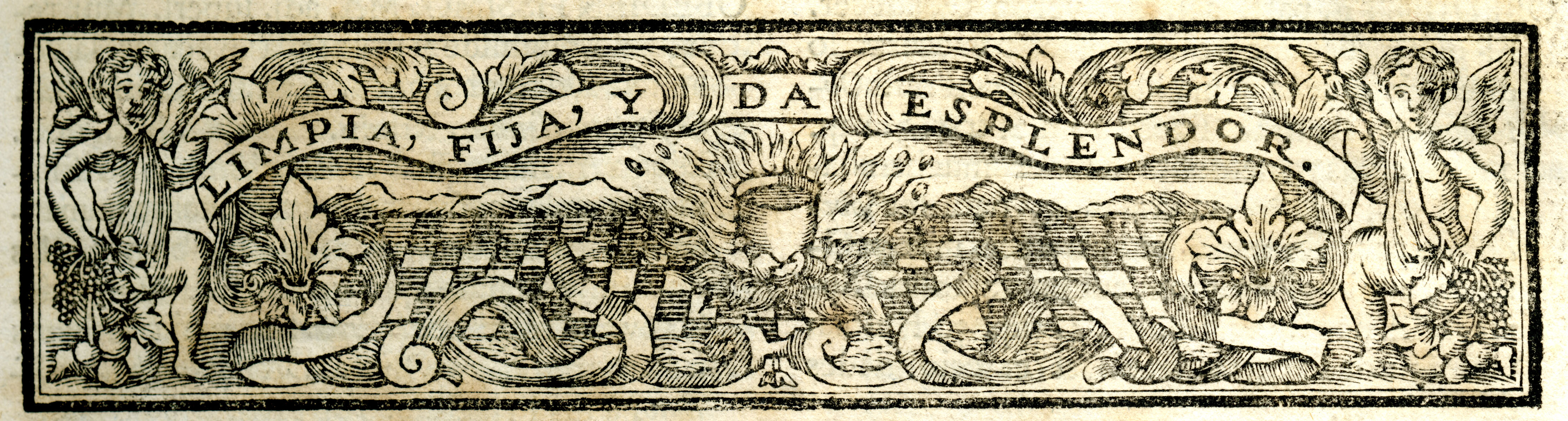
RAE motto from the title page of one of its publications.

According to Salvador Gutiérrez, an academic numerary of the institution, the Academy does not dictate the rules but studies the language, collects information and presents it. The rules of the language are simply the continued use of expressions, some of which are collected by the Academy. Although he also says that it is important to read and write correctly.

Article 1 of the statutes of the Royal Spanish Academy, translated from Spanish, says the following:

The Academy is an institution with legal personality whose main mission is to ensure that the changes experienced by the Spanish language in its constant adaptation to the needs of its speakers do not break the essential unity it maintains throughout the Hispanic world. It must equally ensure that this evolution preserves the characteristic nature of the language, as gradually consolidated over the centuries, as well as establishing and disseminating the criteria for its proper and correct use, and contributing to its splendor.

To achieve these ends, it shall study and promote the study of the history and present of Spanish, it shall disseminate the writings, literary—especially classics—and non-literary, that it deems important for the knowledge of such matters, and will seek to keep alive the memory of those who, in Spain or in the Americas, have cultivated our language with glory.

As a member of the Association of Academies of the Spanish Language, it shall maintain a special relation with the corresponding and associated academies.

== Composition ==
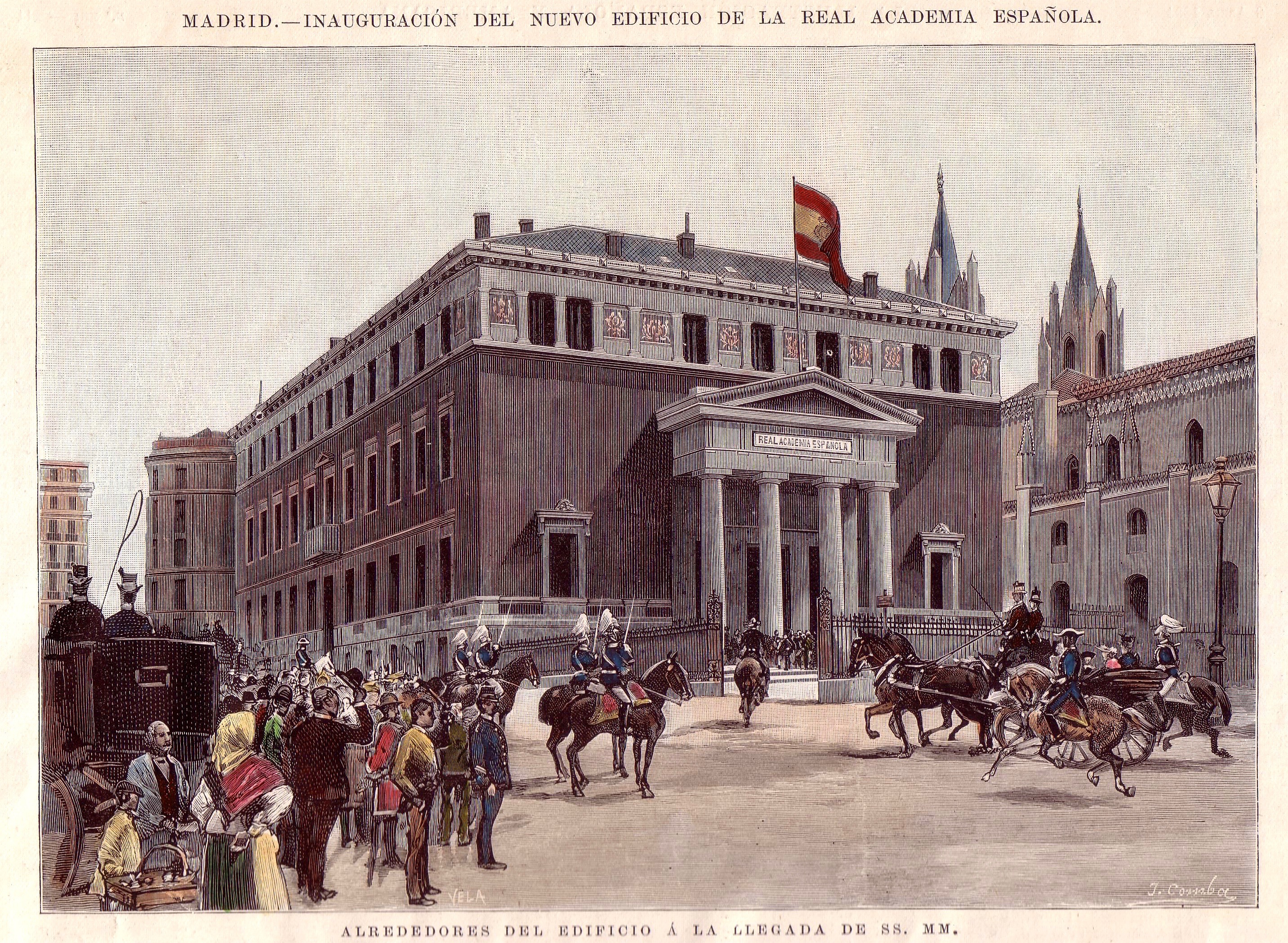
Inauguration of the RAE building in Madrid by Alfonso XIII, 1894.

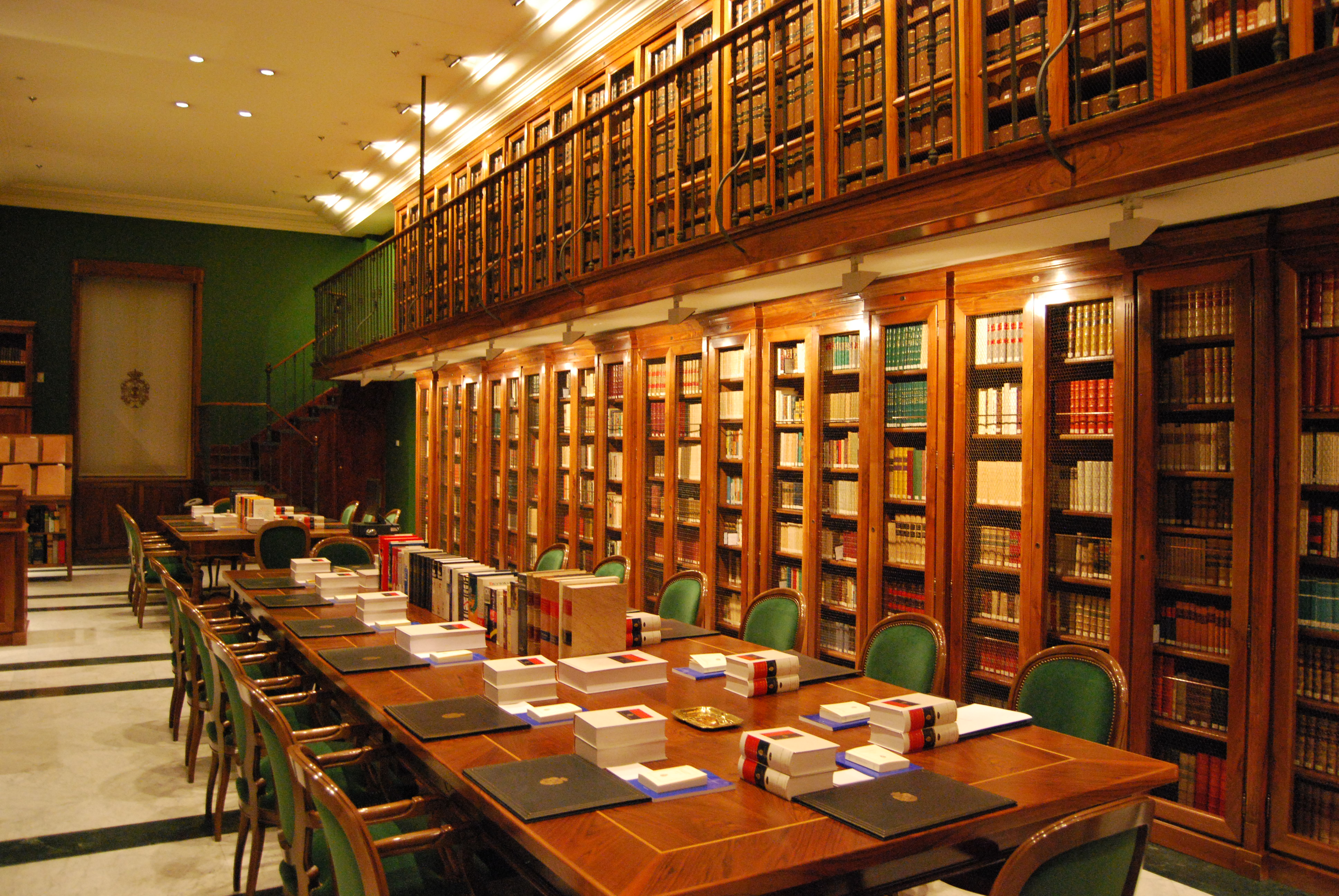
Partial view of the library at the RAE.

Members of the Academy are known as Académicos de número (English: Academic Numerary), chosen from among prestigious people within the arts and sciences, including several Spanish-language authors, known as The Immortals (Spanish: Los Inmortales), similarly to their French Academy counterparts. The numeraries (Spanish: Números) are elected for life by the other academicians. Each academician holds a seat labeled with a letter from the Spanish alphabet, with upper and lower case letters denoting separate seats. Only eight letters of the alphabet do not have—nor have they had in the past—representation in the seats of the RAE: v, w, x, y, z, Ñ, W, Y.

The Academy has included Latin American members from the time of Rafael María Baralt, although some Spanish-speaking countries have their own academies of the language.

=== Current members ===
Seat	Member	Year
O	Pere Gimferrer Torrens	1985
c	Víctor García de la Concha	1992
l	Emilio Lledó Íñigo	1994
u	Antonio Muñoz Molina	1996
V	Juan Luis Cebrián Echarri	1997
t	Ignacio Bosque Muñoz	1997
ñ	Luis María Anson Oliart	1998
I	Luis Mateo Díez Rodríguez	2001
N	Guillermo Rojo Sánchez	2001
k	José Antonio Pascual Rodríguez	2002
E	Carmen Iglesias Cano	2002
T	Arturo Pérez-Reverte Gutiérrez	2003
G	José Manuel Sánchez Ron	2003
j	Álvaro Pombo García de los Ríos	2004
a	Pedro García Barreno	2006
S	Salvador Gutiérrez Ordóñez	2008
D	Darío Villanueva Prieto	2008
m	José María Merino Sánchez	2009
g	Soledad Puértolas Villanueva	2010
P	Inés Fernández-Ordóñez Hernández	2011
Q	Pedro Álvarez de Miranda de la Gándara	2011
e	Juan Gil Fernández	2011
f	José B. Terceiro Lomba	2012
r	Santiago Muñoz Machado	2013
b	Miguel Sáenz Sagaseta de Ilúrdoz	2013
n	Carme Riera Guilera	2013
Z	José Luis Gómez García	2014
B	Aurora Egido Martínez	2014
F	Manuel Gutiérrez Aragón	2016
H	Félix de Azúa Comella	2016
U	Clara Janés Nadal	2016
s	María Paz Battaner Arias	2017
J	Carlos García Gual	2019
M	Juan Antonio Mayorga Ruano	2019
K	José María Bermúdez de Castro Risueño	2022
i	Paloma Díaz-Mas	2022
d	Dolores Corbella Díaz	2023
q	Asunción Gómez Pérez	2023
X	Clara Sánchez	2023
A	Pedro Cátedra García	2024
R	Javier Cercas	2024
p	Cristina Sánchez López	2026
L	Sergio Ramírez	2026
o	Álex Grijelmo	TBA (Note: Numerary was elected but has not yet taken the assigned seat)
C	vacant	
h	vacant	

=== Notable past academicians ===
- Niceto Alcalá-Zamora
- Vicente Aleixandre
- Dámaso Alonso
- José "Azorín" Martínez Ruiz
- Vicente Bacallar y Sanna
- Pío Baroja
- Jacinto Benavente
- Carlos Bousoño
- Manuel Bretón de los Herreros
- Camilo José Cela
- Miguel Delibes
- José Echegaray
- Fernando Fernán Gómez
- Wenceslao Fernández Flórez
- Gaspar Melchor de Jovellanos
- Alicia Jurado
- Antonio Machado
- Salvador de Madariaga
- Julián Marías
- Francisco Martínez de la Rosa
- Ramón Menéndez Pidal
- Armando Palacio Valdés
- José María de Pereda
- Benito Pérez Galdós
- Manuel José Quintana
- Gonzalo Torrente Ballester
- Leonardo Torres Quevedo
- Juan Valera
- José Zorrilla

== Publications ==
Countries with a Spanish language academy

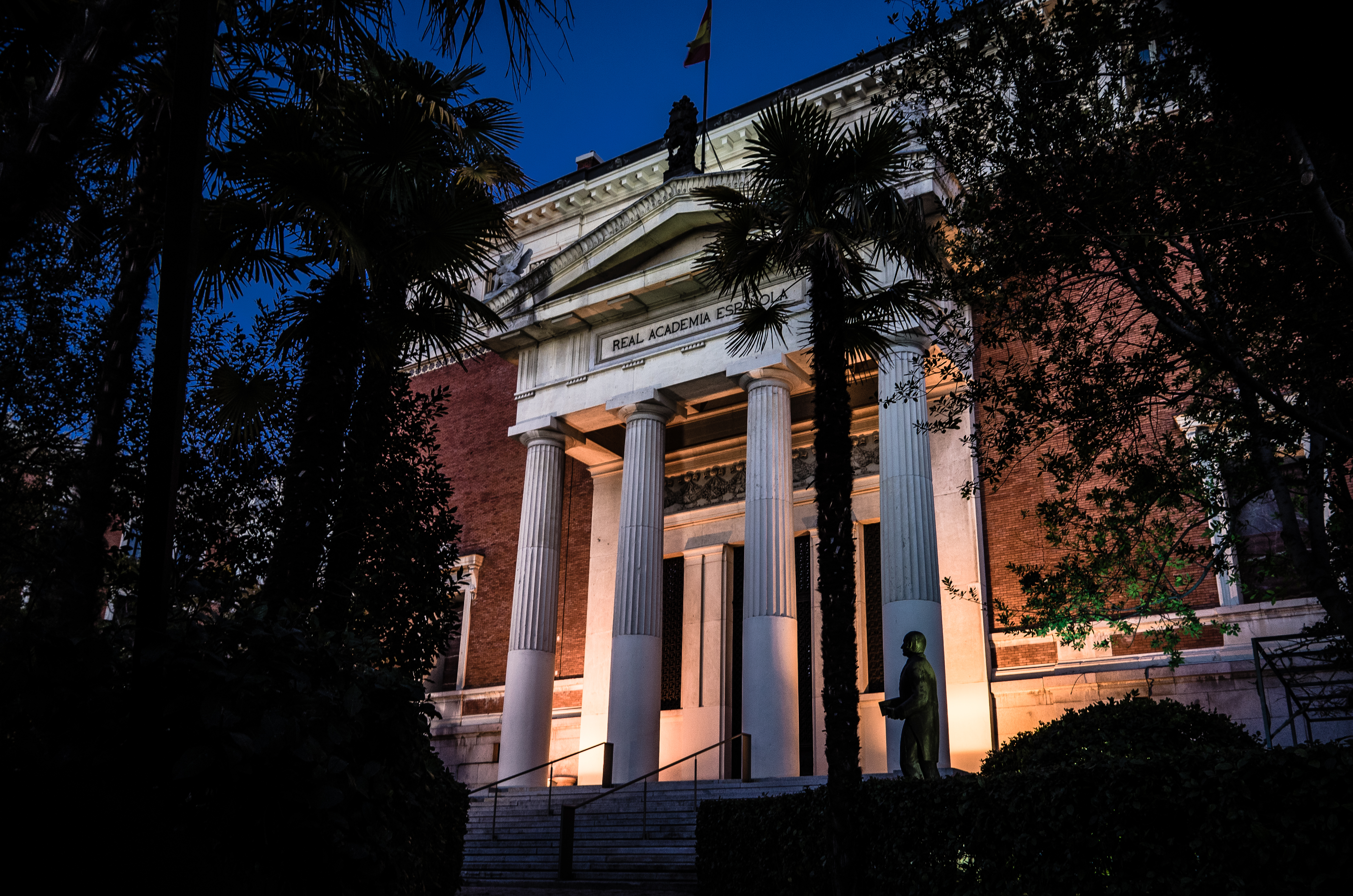
View of the front facade of the RAE building

=== Joint publications of the RAE and the Association of Academies of the Spanish Language ===
- Boletín de la Real Academia Española. The official journal of the academy. First published in 1914.
- Diccionario de la lengua española (Spanish Language Dictionary). The 1st edition was published in 1780, and the 23rd edition in 2014. It can be consulted for free online as of October 2017 and was published in Spain and other Spanish-speaking countries to mark the tricentennial of the founding of the RAE.
  - The Diccionario esencial de la lengua española (Essential Dictionary of the Spanish Language) was published in 2006 as a compendium of the 22nd edition of the Dictionary of the Spanish Language.
- Ortografía de la lengua española (Spanish Language Orthography). The 1st edition was published in 1741 and the latest edition in 2010. The edition of 1999 was the first spelling book to cover the whole Hispanic world, replacing the Nuevas normas de prosodia y ortografía (New Rules for Prosody and Spelling) of 1959.
- Nueva gramática de la lengua española (New Spanish Language Grammar, 1st edition: 2009, 2nd edition: 2025). The edition of 2009 is the first grammar to cover the whole Hispanic world, replacing the prior Gramática de la lengua española (Grammar of the Spanish Language, 1st edition: 1771, latest edition: 1931) and the Esbozo de una Nueva gramática de la lengua española (Outline of a New Grammar of the Spanish Language, 1973). The Nueva gramática de la lengua española of 2009 is available in 3 different versions: The Edición completa (Complete Edition) includes 3,800 pages in two volumes to describe morphology and syntax (published 4 December 2009) plus a third volume of phonetics and phonology and a DVD (early 2010).
  - The Manual edition is a single 750-page volume, which was presented at the 5th Conference of the Spanish Language, which convened virtually in Valparaíso, Chile, due to the 2010 Chile earthquake, and was released on 23 April 2010.
  - The Gramática básica (Basic Grammar) is a 305-page volume directed to people who received secondary education, and which can be adaptable for school use; it was first published in 2011.
  - The RAE has also published two other works by individual editors: Gramática de la lengua española (Grammar of the Spanish Language, by Emilio Alarcos Llorach, 1994) and Gramática descriptiva de la lengua española (Descriptive Grammar of the Spanish Language, 3 volumes, directed by Ignacio Bosque and Violeta Demonte, 1999).
- Diccionario panhispánico de dudas (Pan-Hispanic Dictionary of Doubts, 1st edition: 2005; 2nd edition: 2025). Resolves doubts related to the use of the Spanish language. Can be consulted online since 2006.
- Diccionario del estudiante (Student's Dictionary, 1st edition: 2005). Directed to students in secondary education between 12 and 18 years-old.
  - Diccionario práctico del estudiante (Student's Practical Dictionary, 1st edition: 2007) is an adapted version for Latin America of the Student's Dictionary.
- Diccionario de americanismos (Dictionary of Americanisms) is a listing of Spanish language terms of the Americas and their meaning. First edition published in 2010.
- Diccionario panhispánico del español jurídico, 2017

== See also ==
- List of language regulators

== Bibliography ==
- Sánchez, José; Sanchez, Jose (May 1944). "Evolution of the Spanish Dictionary". Hispania. 27 (2): 131. doi:10.2307/334365. JSTOR 334365.
