= Orders, decorations, and medals of the Napoleonic Kingdoms =

During the time of the Napoleonic Wars and the creation of the Napoleonic Kingdoms and the installation of the Bonaparte Dynasty as rulers. Following the example set by the French Legion of Honour founded by Napoleon (I) Bonaparte several orders were created by the different rulers.

== House of Bonaparte ==
=== Empire of France ===
- (First French Empire) Legion of Honour, (1802)
- (First French Empire) Order of the Three Golden Fleeces, (1809) Never awarded
- (First French Empire) Order of the Reunion, (1811) Inherited from the Kingdom of Holand
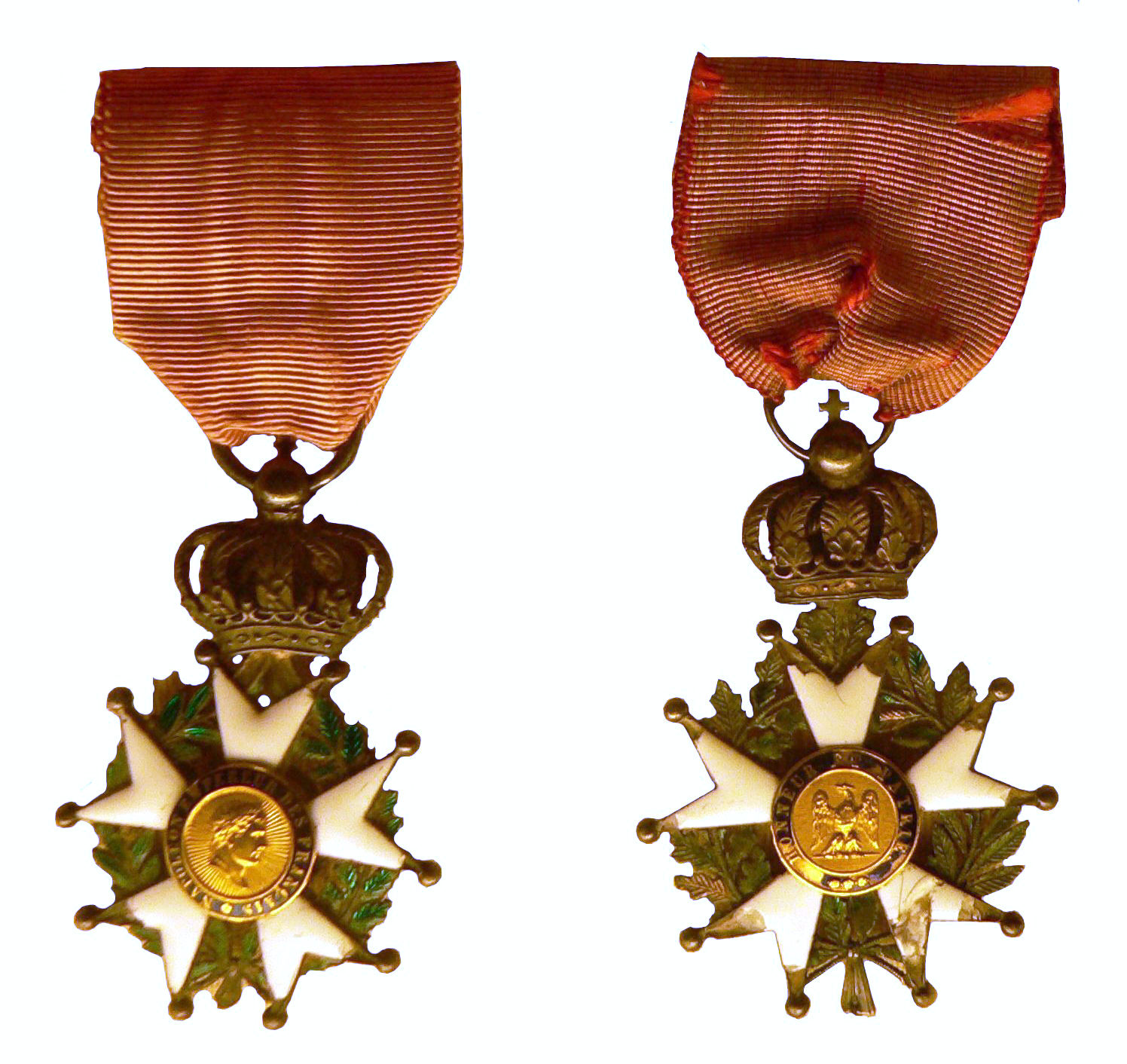
Napoleonic Legion of Honour (1st French Empire)

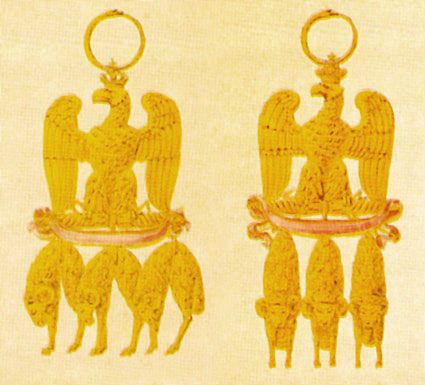
Concept for the Badge of the Order of the Three Golden Fleeces (1st French Empire)

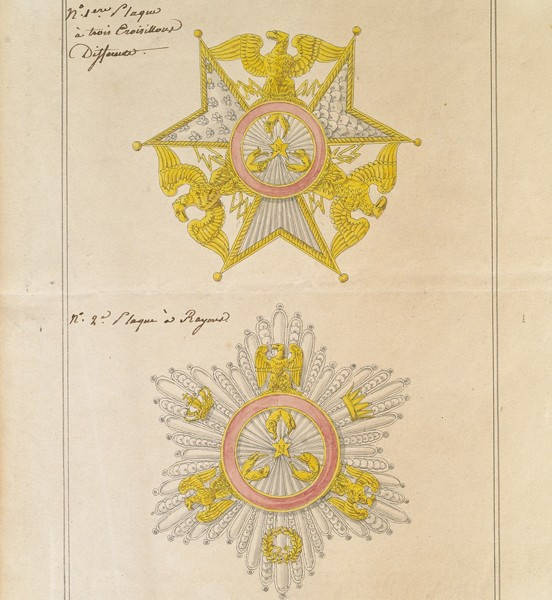
Concept for the Star of the Order of the Three Golden Fleeces (1st French Empire)

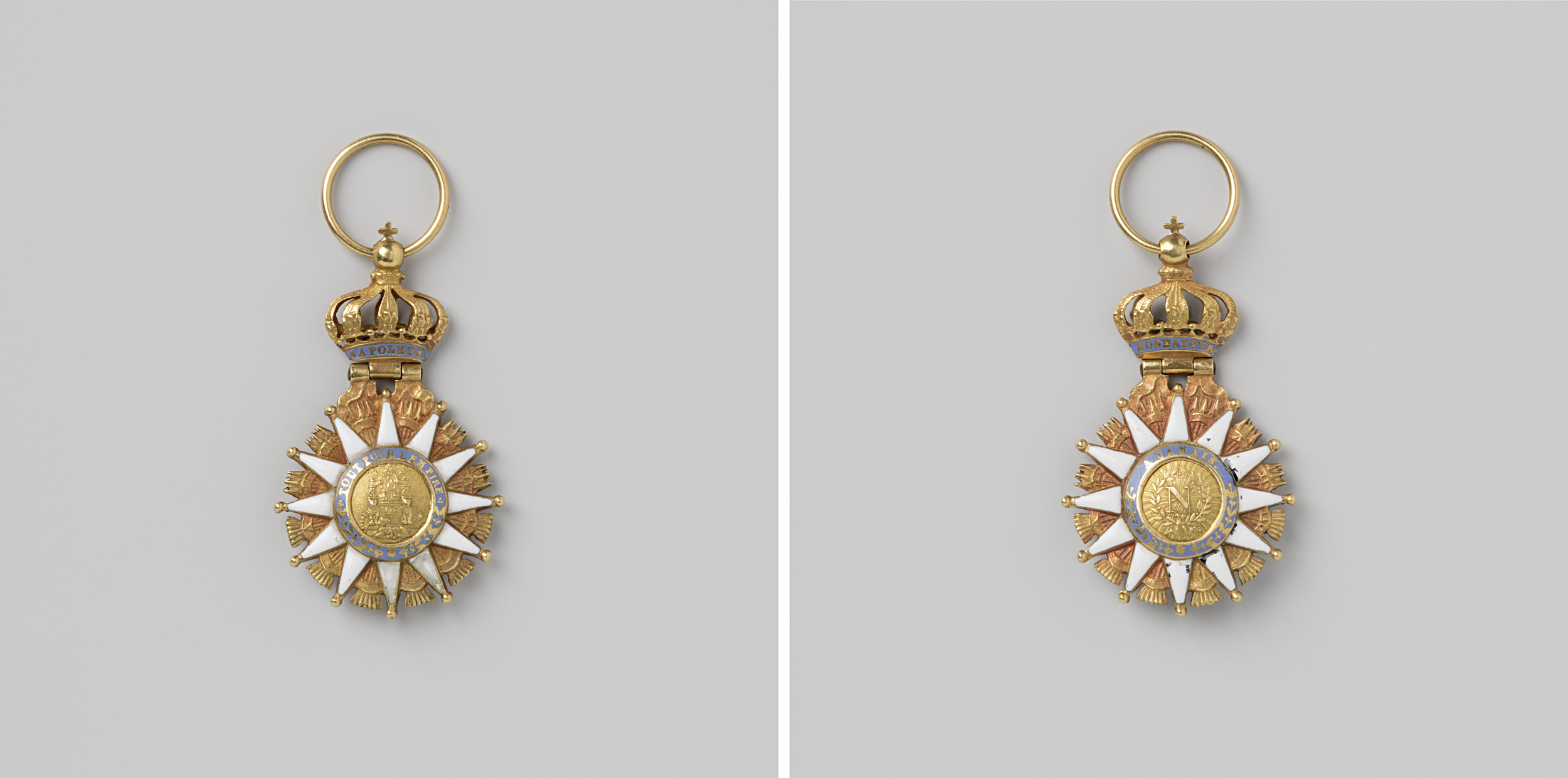
Napoleonic Order of the Reunion (1st French Empire)

=== Kingdom of Italy ===
- (Kingdom of Italy (Napoleonic)) Order of the Iron Crown, (1805)
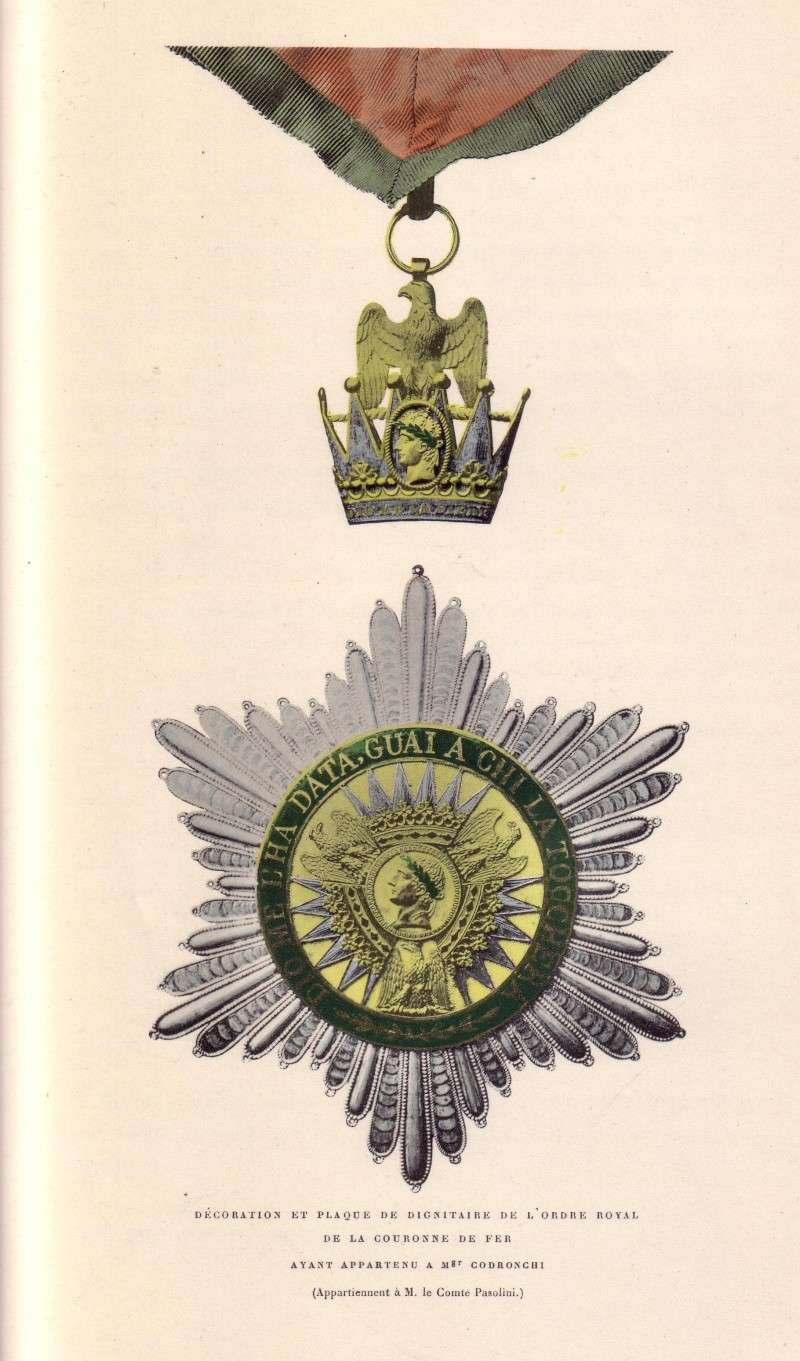
Napoleonic Order of the Iron Crown (Kingdom of Italy)

=== Kingdom of Naples ===
- (Kingdom of Naples) Royal Order of the Two-Sicilies, (1808)
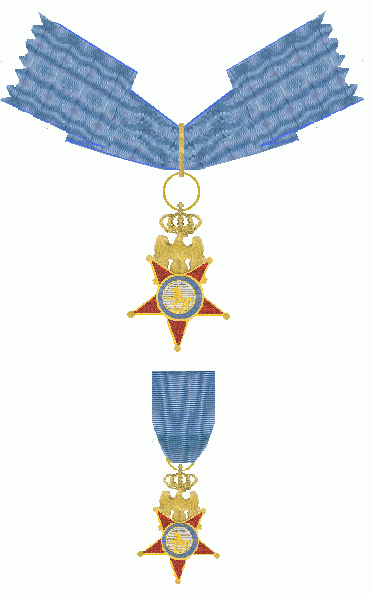
Napoleonic Royal order of the Two-Sicilies (Kingdom of Naples)

=== Kingdom of Holland ===
- (United Kingdom of the Netherlands) Order of the Union, (1806)
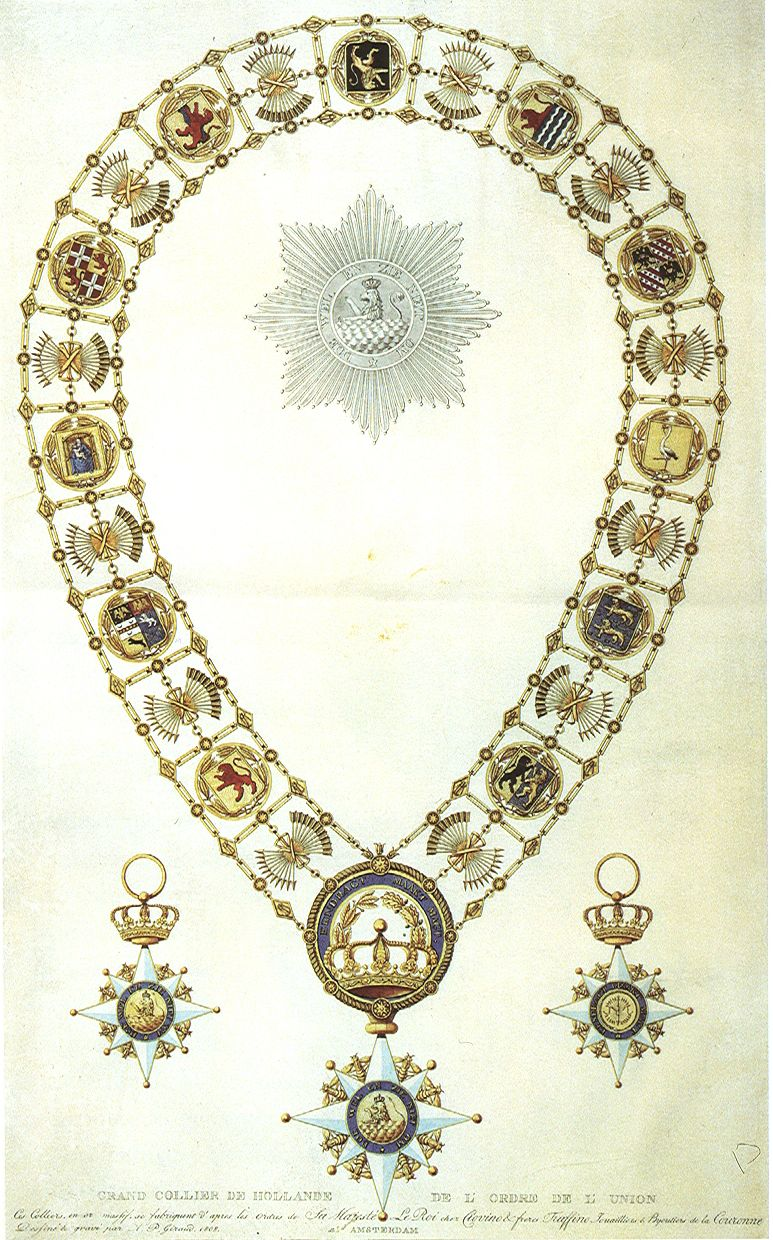
Napoleonic Order of the Union (Kingdom of Holland)

=== Kingdom of Westphalia ===
- Order of the Crown of Westphalia, (1809)
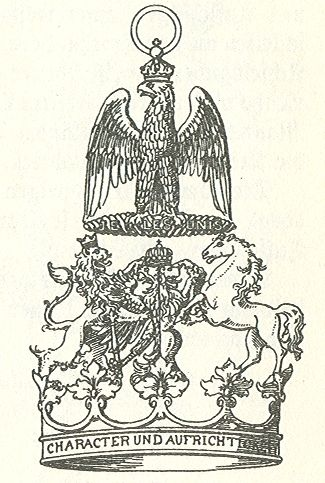
Napoleonic Order of the Crown of Westphalia Badge (Kingdom of Westphalia)

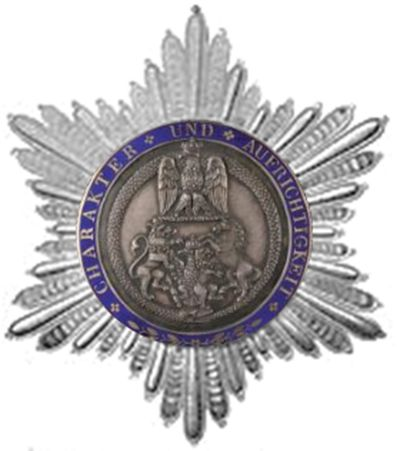
Napoleonic Order of the Crown of Westphalia Star (Kingdom of Westphalia)

=== Kingdom of Spain ===
- Royal Order of Spain, (1808)
- Order of the Golden Fleece, (1430) Not founded by the Bonapartes'
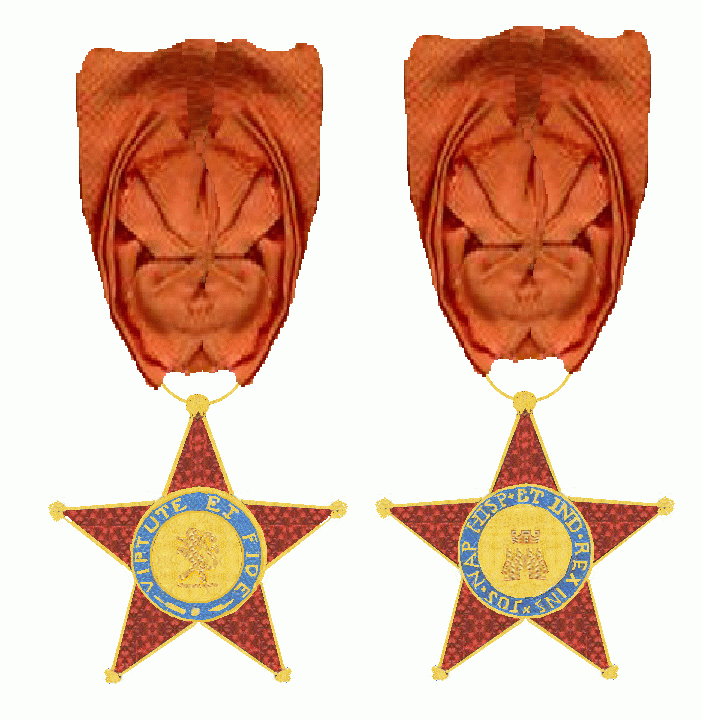
Napoleonic Royal Order of Spain (Kingdom of Spain)

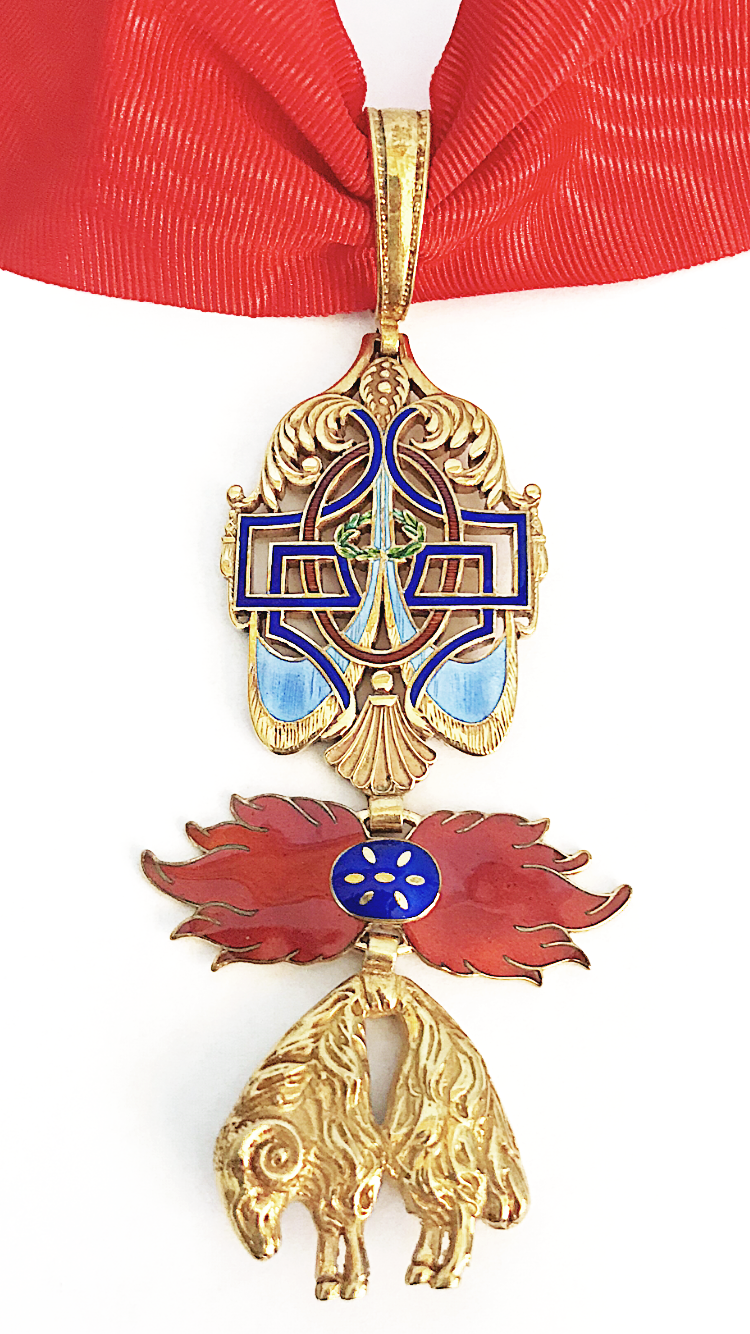
Badge of the Order of the Golden Fleece (Spain)

== Coat of Arms ==
Coat of Arms of the 1st French Empire

Coat of Arms of the Kingdom of Italy

Coat of Arms of the Kingdom of Naples and Sicily

Coat of Arms of the Kingdom of Holland

Coat of Arms of the Kingdom of Westphalia

Coat of Arms of the Kingdom of Spain and the Indies
