= Afrancesado =

Francophile in Spain and Portugal

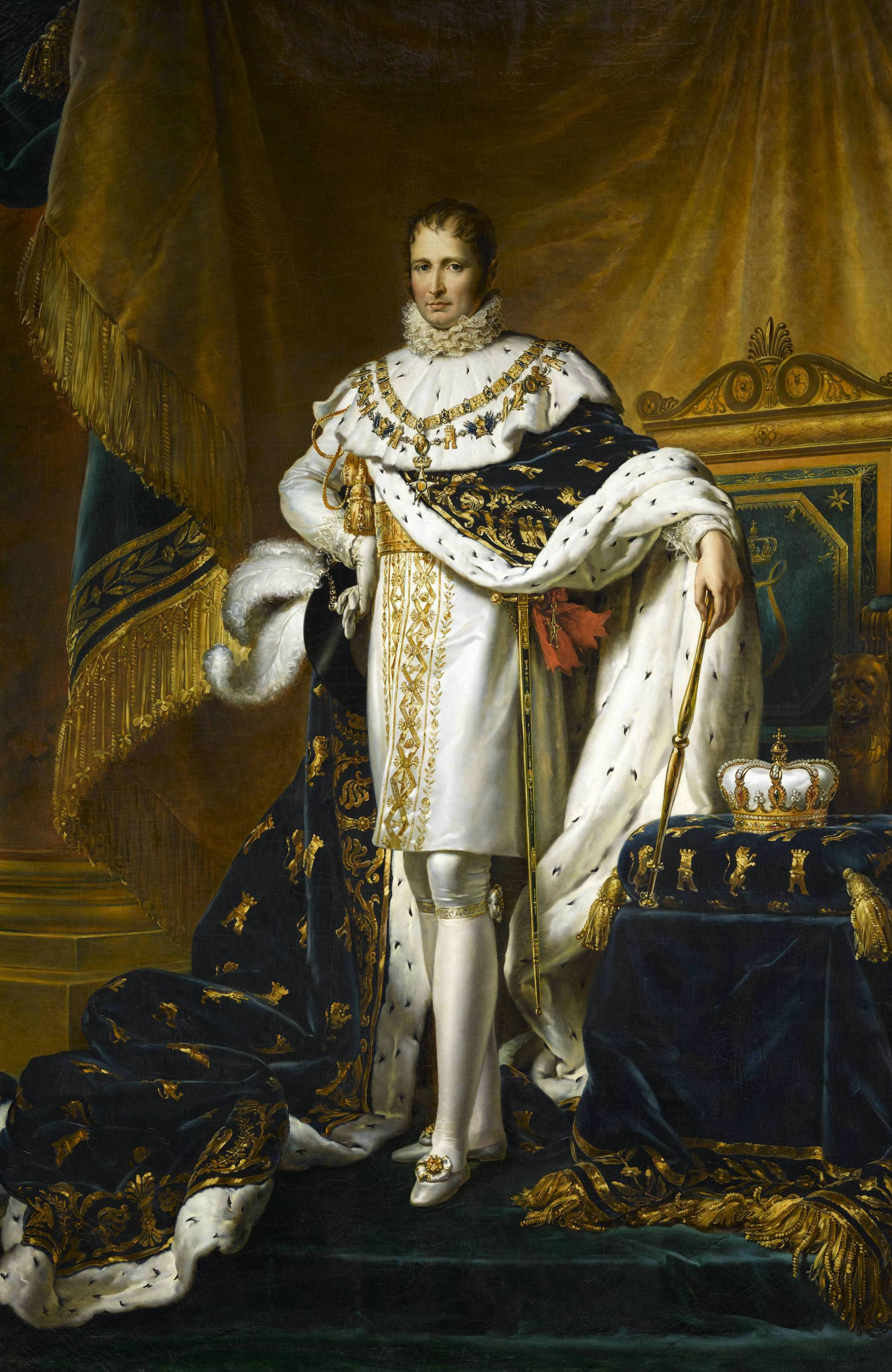
Portrait of Joseph Bonaparte by François Gérard. Bonaparte was King of Spain from 1808 to 1814

Afrancesado (Spanish: [afɾanθeˈsaðo], Portuguese: [ɐfɾɐ̃sɨˈzaðu]; "Francophile" or "turned-French", lit. "Frenchified" or "French-alike") refers to the Spanish and Portuguese supporters of Enlightenment ideas, Liberalism, or the French Revolution, that supported Napoleon's occupation as a means to implant these ideas in Spain.

In principle, afrancesados were upper-and-middle class supporters of the French occupation of Iberia (Portugal and Spain), preferring the reforms of the "enlightened despots" Napoleon I and his brother Joseph Bonaparte (installed by Napoleon as King of Spain) or, as a lesser evil, preferring to avoid the consequences of outright war with the greatest military power in Europe.

== Spain ==
=== Origins ===
In Spain, the term afrancesado surfaced during the reign of Charles III, and had a neutral meaning, being used to designate those who followed French fashions and customs. Subsequently, it became popular as a pejorative reference to those members of the Spanish nobility and bureaucracy who swore allegiance to Joseph Bonaparte, installed as King of Spain by his brother, Napoleon. The term extended to cover a predominantly middle class intellectual, merchant, or manufacturer who saw the French as agents of change in the rigid structure of Spanish society, and who reacted against the perceived corruption and incompetence of Charles IV and the House of Bourbon in general (including Joseph's competitor Ferdinand VII).

=== Political program ===
King Joseph found himself at war with the majority of his subjects. He relied on the afrancesados to enforce a project that would gradually replace tradition and absolutism with a system Leandro Fernández de Moratín defined as based on razón, la justicia y el poder (reason, justice, and power). Progressive but not entirely liberal, this political creation was soon rejected by both conservatives and liberals (many liberals joined the guerilla against the occupation). The afrancesados were also weary of French designs: more favourable to the Revolution than of the Empire, they aimed to withdraw Spain from the Napoleonic Wars, and tried in vain to prevent Napoleon's separate administration of Spanish provinces (Catalonia, Aragon, Navarre, and Biscay) after 1809.

The Viceroyalty of the Río de la Plata had a French viceroy at the time, Santiago de Liniers. However, his appointment took place before the Peninsular War, and France was not involved at all in it: it was instead a consequence of the failed British invasions of the River Plate. Napoleon and Joseph sent the Marquis of Sassenay to the zone, seeking support from Liniers to the new monarchy, but Liniers rejected it and confirmed his loyalty to the captive Ferdinand VII.

Later, they also attempted to negotiate with the anti-French Cortes of Cádiz – which served as a parliamentary Regency after Ferdinand was deposed – to maintain as much possible of Joseph's Bayonne laws of 1808 into Ferdinand's 1812 Constitution. Nonetheless, the Cortes voted to confiscate all assets of Joseph's court and of the afrancesados.

=== Anti-French sentiment ===
May 29, 1808, the Supreme Junta Government would issue the Proclamation of Seville; an order to resist the French and protect the country. The proclamation would call traitors out as well as the French, "Our holy religion, our only hope, is going to perish or be reduced to vain forms, being without support or protection; and all of this by a foreign power, and not by arms but rather by deception and treachery, using our own people." The junta directly blames the afrancesados calling out their "infamous cowardice".

The Proclamation of Galicia calls out traitors, "It is true that a few spurious men are submitting to their infamous ideas, and a few submitted with impunity a few days ago, just as other vile and fickle Frenchmen have done". The Proclamation of Galicia is a much more conservative version; the infamous ideas are of atheism "seeking to mix them together with godless and vile slaves they have brought to Spain".

=== Exile ===
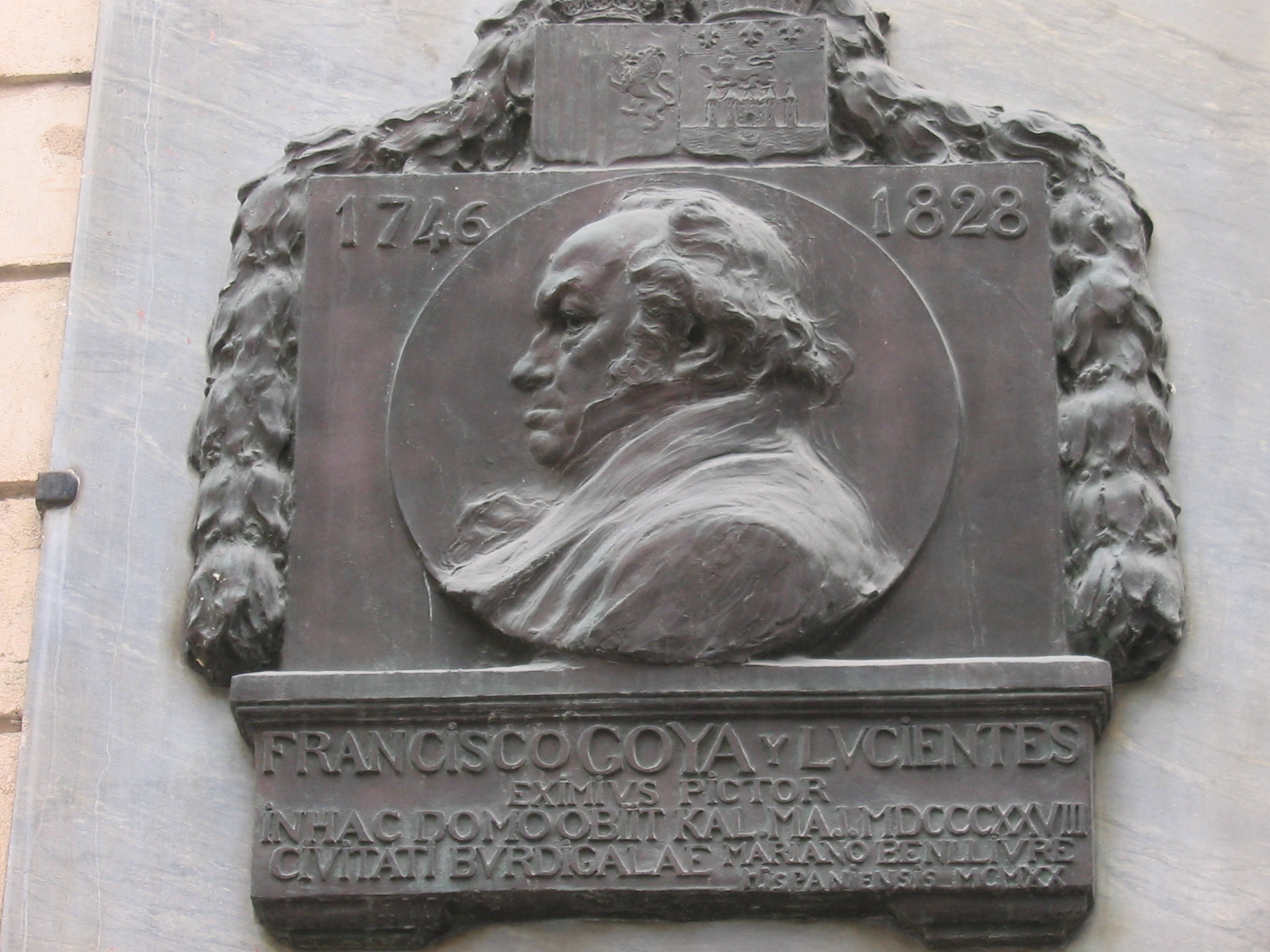
Plaque commemorating Francisco Goya's exile to Bordeaux

After the Duke of Wellington's 1813 campaign and the Battle of Vitoria, all of Joseph's court and his collaborators (nobles, soldiers, jurists, writers, journalists, and Roman Catholic clergy alike) took refuge to France with Marshal Jean-Baptiste Jourdan's forces. The total estimate of this exile is fluctuating between 4,000 and 12,000 persons at its peak.

Ferdinand broke the terms of his agreement with Napoleon after his return from imprisonment at the Château de Valençay (May 4, 1814), and began a campaign of persecution, defining as afrancesados most of those who had not risen in combat against the French: colaboracionistas (servants of French interests), receivers of honours and distinctions handed by King Joseph, co-operating bureaucrats (those who had not resigned their positions during the occupation), or even those who were sought by the French as collaborators but had denied offers.

The immense number of liberally-minded émigrés alarmed the authorities of the Bourbon Restoration in France, and they began steps to convince the Spanish government to pardon them. This came during the Liberal Triennium, as an amnesty decreed by liberal Premier Evaristo Pérez de Castro; those that did return had to flee soon after the Quintuple Alliance intervention. On April 21, 1832, France ordered them to solve their highly problematic stateless condition by either settling in the country or leaving its territory. Joseph Bonaparte's great-great-grandson Frederick Joseph Benton (born in 1954) reviewed the afrancesado doctrine in 1999 but has done nothing to advance its cause.

=== Notable Spanish afrancesados ===
- Francisco Amorós, provincial governor and pedagogue
- Ramón José de Arce, Archbishop of Zaragoza
- Miguel José de Azanza, government minister
- Javier de Burgos, jurist, politician and journalist
- François Cabarrus (considered an afrancesado in retrospect), minister of Finance
- Fernando Camborda, journalist and poet
- José Antonio Conde, historian and interpreter
- Pedro Estala, historian and writer
- Leandro Fernández de Moratín, writer
- Diego Fernández de Velasco, military and diplomat
- Luis Figueroa y Casaus, military and businessman
- José Mamerto Gómez Hermosilla, journalist and writer
- Francisco Goya (doubtful), painter
- Pablo de Jérica, journalist and writer
- Alberto Lista, professor and poet
- Juan Antonio Llorente, historian
- José Marchena Ruiz de Cueto, writer
- Francisco Martínez Marina, writer and historian
- Juan Meléndez Valdés, poet and government minister
- Sebastián Miñano, writer and historian
- Manuel Narganes, journalist
- Martín Fernández de Navarrete
- Manuel Negrete de la Torre, government minister
- Gonzalo O'Farrill, government minister
- Cipriano de Palafox, military
- Manuel José Quintana, poet
- Félix José Reinoso, writer
- Juan Sempere y Guarinos, politician and writer
- Manuel Silvela y García de Aragón, writer and magistrate
- Fernando Sor, classical guitarist and composer
- Diego Pacheco Téllez-Girón Gómez de Sandoval, Mayordomo mayor
- Mariano Luis de Urquijo, Prime minister
- Juan Van Halen, military
- Francisco Antonio Zea, botanist and prefect

== Portugal ==
The term afrancesado in Portugal is connected with liberal politicians who organised the Revolution of Porto, begun on August 25, 1820. Demanding the rule of law as opposed to William Carr Beresford's arbitrary regime, they called for the return of King John VI - who had preferred to remain in Rio de Janeiro, Brazil, where he had transferred the Portuguese court during the French invasion.

French influence, already present during the War of the Oranges (1801), had familiarised the afrancesado elite with principles such as the separation of powers and parliamentarianism, which they demanded to have enforced in Portugal. The French occupation of Portugal (1807-1808) lasted only 9 months, but several Portuguese joined the French army after its evacuation of Portugal, forming the Portuguese Legion. The Portuguese Legion took part in the French campaigns in Germany, Austria and Russia.

=== Notable Portuguese afrancesados ===
- Pedro de Almeida Portugal
- Gomes Freire de Andrade
- Manuel Inácio Martins Pamplona Corte Real
