= Rincón de Soto =

- Municipality
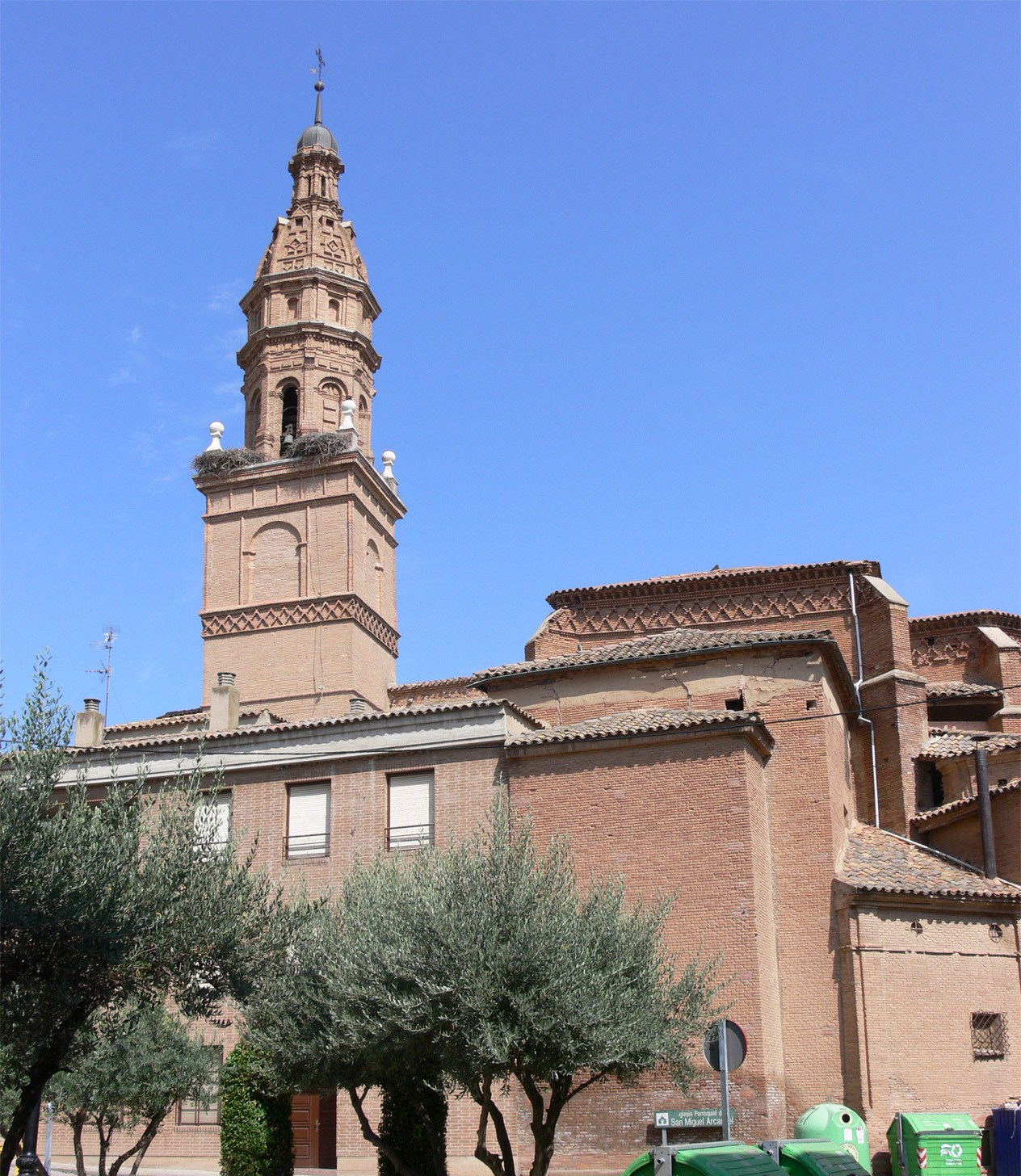
- Church of San Miguel

- Coat of arms

- Location within La Rioja, Spain Location within Spain
- Coordinates: 42°14′04″N 1°51′03″W
- Country: Spain
- Autonomous community: La Rioja
- Comarca: Alfaro

Government
  - Mayor: Carlos Paul Lapedriza (PP)

Area
  - Total: 19.86 km^{2} (7.67 sq mi)
- Elevation: 261 m (856 ft)

Population (2025-01-01)
  - Total: 4,041
- Demonym(s): rinconero, ra
- Postal code: 26550
- Website: www.rincondesoto.org

Rincón de Soto is a village in the province and autonomous community of La Rioja, Spain. The municipality covers an area of 19.86 square kilometres (7.67 sq mi) and as of 2011 had a population of 3819 people.

== Notable people ==
- Juan Antonio Llorente
- Fernando Llorente
- Rubén Pardo
