= José Mamerto Gómez Hermosilla =

Spanish writer (1771–1837)

José Mamerto Gómez Hermosilla (2 May 1771, in Madrid – 31 March 1837) was a Spanish Hellenist, journalist and writer.

== Biography ==
Son of Vicente Gómez and Josefa de Hermosilla, he studied Latin and rhetoric with the Piarists of Getafe around 1782. At the college of St. Thomas of Madrid, he studied three years of philosophy; and four of theology, Ecclesiastic Discipline, and Literature in San Isidro. Beginning 1785 was one of the many academic theologists of St. Thomas. During the final stage of his education, he decided to pursue studies in mathematics and the Greek language at the Reales Estudios de San Isidro. There, between 1796 and 1800, he took charge of the chair of Greek and in 1802, he assumed the chair of Rhetoric at the same institution.

During the Napoleonic occupation (1808-1813), Hermosilla sided with the French. This led him, initially, to hold a number of significant administrative positions. Consequently, following the end of the occupation, he was forced into exile in France. Thus, between 1813 and 1820, he lived in Montpellier and Paris, earning his living by teaching rhetoric and the Greek language. During this period, his Compendio de Bellas Letras (Compendium of Belles-Lettres) anticipated the literary precepts that would later take definitive form in his Arte de hablar (The Art of Speaking).

Upon his return to Spain during the Trienio Liberal, Hermosilla, together with Alberto Lista and Sebastián Miñano, founded the periodical El Censor. Through this publication, he disseminated a large number of articles in which he championed his Afrancesado (pro-French/Enlightenment-influenced) ideas. Following the restoration of Absolutism in 1823, Hermosilla steadily advanced in both academic and political circles. His book El Jacobinismo (Jacobinism), in which he demonstrated unwavering loyalty to King Ferdinand VII, earned him the favor of the Court. This led to his appointment as secretary to the Commission of Studies and to the General Inspectorate of Public Instruction, positions he held between 1825 and 1835. From 1836 onward, he served as secretary to the King.

It was during this interval that Hermosilla published his two most influential works. Foremost among them was the highly celebrated and controversial Arte de hablar en prosa y verso (The Art of Speaking in Prose and Verse), a text that, for many years, served as the mandatory and exclusive textbook for courses in the humanities. Five years later, in 1831, Hermosilla brought to light his translation of the Iliad. This book was what the theorist himself termed his “life’s work”.
He died of an apoplectic stroke in March 1837.
