= Spain under Joseph Bonaparte =

Napoleonic client state (1808–1813)

Kingdom of Spain and the Indies Reino de España y de las Indias (Spanish) (Note: "Spain" was the Enlightenment-era term for the peninsular territories of the Monarchy, conceived as a unified whole. "The Spains" (Spanish: "las Españas") is a traditional term used by the monarchs since the Habsburg era to refer to the plurality of kingdoms under the Crown; Spanish liberalism later adopted it to designate all of the Monarchy's territories, both on the peninsula and overseas.) Royaume d'Espagne et des Indies (French)
- 1808–1813
- Flag Royal Coat of arms
- Motto: Plus Ultra (Latin) "Further Beyond"
- Anthem: Marcha Real (Spanish) "Royal March"
- Spanish territory occupied at some point during the war by King Joseph Bonaparte. Military governments dependent on Paris (since 1810): Biscay, Navarre and Aragon Military government of Catalonia, dependent on Paris (since 1810) / Territory annexed to the French Empire (from 1812 until the Treaty of Valençay in 1813). Territory never occupied by Joseph Bonaparte's government, besides Spanish America, the Philippines, Spanish Guinea: Canary Islands, Cadiz, Ceuta, Melilla, Cartagena, Alicante and Balearic Islands.
- Status: Client state of the French Empire
- Capital: Madrid
- Official languages: Spanish; French (dynastic)
- Common languages: Catalan; Basque; Galician
- Religion: Catholicism (State Religion)
- Demonyms: Spaniard, Spanish
- Government: Unitary semi-constitutional monarchy
- King
  - 1808–1813: Joseph I
- Regent
  - 1808: Joachim Murat
- First Secretary of State
  - 1808–1813: Mariano Luis de Urquijo
  - 1813: Juan de O’Donojú y O’Ryan
  - 1813: Fernando de Laserna
- Legislature: Cortes Generales
- Historical era: Napoleonic Wars
  - Abdications of Bayonne: 6 May 1808
  - Statute adopted: 8 July 1808
  - Battle of Vitoria: 21 June 1813
  - Treaty of Valençay: 11 December 1813
- Currency: Spanish real
Preceded by	Succeeded by
Kingdom of Spain	Kingdom of Spain
- Today part of: Spain

Bonapartist Spain was a Napoleonic client state established in 1808 after Napoleon, who had stationed his Imperial Army in Spain under the pretense of a joint Franco–Spanish invasion of Portugal, forced the ruling Spanish Bourbons to abdicate, and installed his brother, Joseph Bonaparte on the Spanish throne, which ignited a people's revolt by Spanish citizens and led to the Peninsular War, where France was defeated and forced to retreat from Spain.

The kingdom was officially known as Kingdom of Spain and the Indies, with "the Indies" referring to the East and West Indies as well as Spain's colonial possessions more broadly. The texts of the Bayonne abdications and the Bayonne Statute take care to distinguish the traditional titles of King Joseph from the name of the kingdom. It never managed to exert control over these territories however, not only did the French invasion weaken Spain's grasp on its overseas empire, without Joseph Bonaparte being recognized as king anywhere in the Americas, but even on the Spanish mainland, the House of Bonaparte's grip was tenuous. Large parts of the country came under the control of juntas, which remained loyal to Ferdinand VII and the old Bourbon kingdom, allying with the Coalition forces of Britain and Portugal to undermine the French occupation.

Guerrilla warfare bogged down French troops for years in Iberia, which hindered the French military and Napoleon referring to Spain as the Spanish Ulcer. A series of decisive Coalition victories from 1812 to 1813 at Salamanca and Vitoria meant the defeat of the Bonapartist régime and the expulsion of Napoleon I's troops. In the Treaty of Valençay Napoleon recognized Ferdinand VII as the legitimate King of Spain, though the Bourbon and Anglo-Portuguese forces continued to pursue the retreating French Imperial Army as part of the Sixth Coalition in an invasion of France.

== Background: From alliance with First French Republic and First French Empire to the Peninsular War ==
=== The abdications of Ferdinand VII and Charles IV ===
Spain had been allied with France against Great Britain since the Second Treaty of San Ildefonso (1796), which aligned Spanish foreign policy with that of the French Republic during the Revolutionary Wars. The alliance suffered a major blow when the combined Franco-Spanish fleet was defeated by the British Royal Navy at the Battle of Trafalgar (1805), resulting in the destruction of much of Spain's naval power and weakening its position as a maritime empire. Relations between the allies grew increasingly strained in the aftermath of Trafalgar. Spain resented both the loss of its fleet and the economic consequences of adherence to Napoleon’s Continental System, which aimed to exclude British trade from European markets. Despite these tensions, France and Spain agreed to the Treaty of Fontainebleau (1807), which provided for the partition of Portugal, a long-standing ally of Britain that had refused to comply with the Continental System.

Napoleon was well aware of Spain's internal political instability and the weakness of the Bourbon monarchy under Charles IV of Spain. Under the pretext of preparing the invasion of Portugal, French troops were permitted to enter Spain. However, additional forces continued to arrive even after Portugal had been occupied, creating suspicion that Napoleon intended to intervene directly in Spanish affairs.

The growing French military presence intensified domestic tensions within Spain, contributing to the Tumult of Aranjuez (March 1808), a popular uprising led by supporters of the heir apparent Ferdinand VII. The revolt forced Charles IV to abdicate in favor of his son, while the king’s chief minister Manuel de Godoy was dismissed and arrested.

Ferdinand VII entered Madrid as king, but Napoleon summoned both Ferdinand and Charles IV to Bayonne in France. There, in a series of negotiations known as the Abdications of Bayonne (1808), Napoleon compelled Ferdinand to renounce the throne in favor of his father, who in turn ceded his rights to Napoleon. Napoleon then installed his brother Joseph Bonaparte as King of Spain. The carefully staged abdications were intended to provide a veneer of dynastic legitimacy for the new Bonapartist regime.

=== The installation of Joseph Bonaparte ===
Charles IV hoped that Napoleon I, who by this time had 100,000 troops stationed in Spain, would help him regain the throne. However, Napoleon I refused to help Charles IV, and also refused to recognize his son - Ferdinand VII, as the new king. Instead, he succeeded in pressuring both Charles IV and Ferdinand VII to cede the crown to his brother, Joseph Bonaparte. The head of the French forces in Spain, Marshal Joachim Murat, meanwhile pressed for the former Prime Minister of Spain, Manuel de Godoy, whose role in inviting the French forces into Spain had led to the mutiny of Aranjuez, to be set free. The failure of the remaining Spanish government to stand up to Murat caused popular anger. On 2 May 1808, the younger son of Charles IV, the Infante Francisco de Paula, left Spain for France, leading to a widespread rebellion in the streets of Madrid.

The Council of Castile, the main organ of central government in Spain under Charles IV, was now in Napoleon's control. However, due to the popular anger at French rule, it quickly lost authority outside the population centers which were directly French-occupied. To oppose this occupation, former regional governing institutions, such as the Cortes of Aragon and the Board of the Principality of Asturias, resurfaced in parts of Spain; elsewhere, juntas (councils) were created to fill the power vacuum and lead the struggle against French imperial forces. Provincial juntas began to coordinate their actions; regional juntas were formed to oversee the provincial ones. Finally, on 25 September 1808, a single Supreme Central Junta was established in Aranjuez to serve as the acting resistance government for all of Spain. The Supreme Central Junta was pushed out of Aranjuez in November 1808. The Junta relocated to Alcázar of Seville, and resided there from 16 December 1808 until 23 January 1810.

=== The French occupation ===
Joachim Murat initiated military operations intended to suppress centers of resistance loyal to Ferdinand VII. French forces advanced along key strategic routes linking Madrid with northern Spain, besieging important strongholds such as Zaragoza, Girona, and Valencia. Another French army, commanded by General Pierre Dupont de l'Étang, advanced south into Andalusia and captured Córdoba, where the city was subjected to significant plundering.

Rather than continuing toward Cádiz as originally intended, Dupont was ordered to reverse his advance and return toward Madrid. During this withdrawal, his forces encountered a Spanish army under General Francisco Javier Castaños. On 22 July 1808, the French suffered a decisive defeat at the Battle of Bailén, marking the first major open-field defeat of Napoleonic forces in Europe. The capitulation of Dupont’s army had significant political repercussions, strengthening resistance movements both within Spain and elsewhere in Europe by demonstrating that French imperial forces were not invincible.

Following the defeat, King Joseph I temporarily abandoned Madrid and withdrew northward to Vitoria. In the autumn of 1808, Napoleon I personally entered Spain at the head of a large army. French forces recaptured Madrid on 2 December 1808, restoring Joseph Bonaparte to the capital and reasserting French control over much of central Spain. At the same time, a British expeditionary force under Sir John Moore advanced into Spain from Portugal in support of Spanish resistance. Faced with Napoleon’s superior forces, Moore was compelled to retreat toward the northwestern coast, culminating in evacuation by sea following the Battle of Corunna (January 1809).

French offensives continued in subsequent campaigns. By early 1810, French forces had advanced deep into the Iberian Peninsula and approached Lisbon. However, they were unable to overcome the extensive defensive fortifications known as the Lines of Torres Vedras, constructed under the direction of Arthur Wellesley, later Duke of Wellington. These fortifications successfully halted the French advance and preserved Portugal as a base for continued Allied operations.

=== Calls for Spanish resistance ===
The juntas forming after the installation of Joseph issued public appeals for their countrymen to take up arms to restore the Spanish monarchy. These juntas used many ideals from the French revolution; many would invoke the doctrine of national sovereignty.

The Supreme Junta of Government called on their countrymen in the Proclamation of Seville, May 29, 1808. "The fundamental laws of the monarchy have been trampled on; our property is being threatened along with our customs, our women, and everything else that is precious to the nation". The proclamation brought up duty "the scared obligations we swore as Spaniards" and liberty "your liberty, your monarchs, your holy religion... is in clear, immediate, and urgent danger".

The Proclamation of Galicia was a more conservative version of the Proclamation of Seville, which invoked the Reconquista; "From the immense Mohammedan armies our fathers achieved to liberate the soil we stand upon under the banner of Religion, now we will fear to fight the horde of vile Atheists, led by the protector of Jews?"

The juntas invoked many of the ideals from the enlightenment, these ideals had been tempered throughout the French occupation so as not to lose international support.

== Reign of Joseph I ==
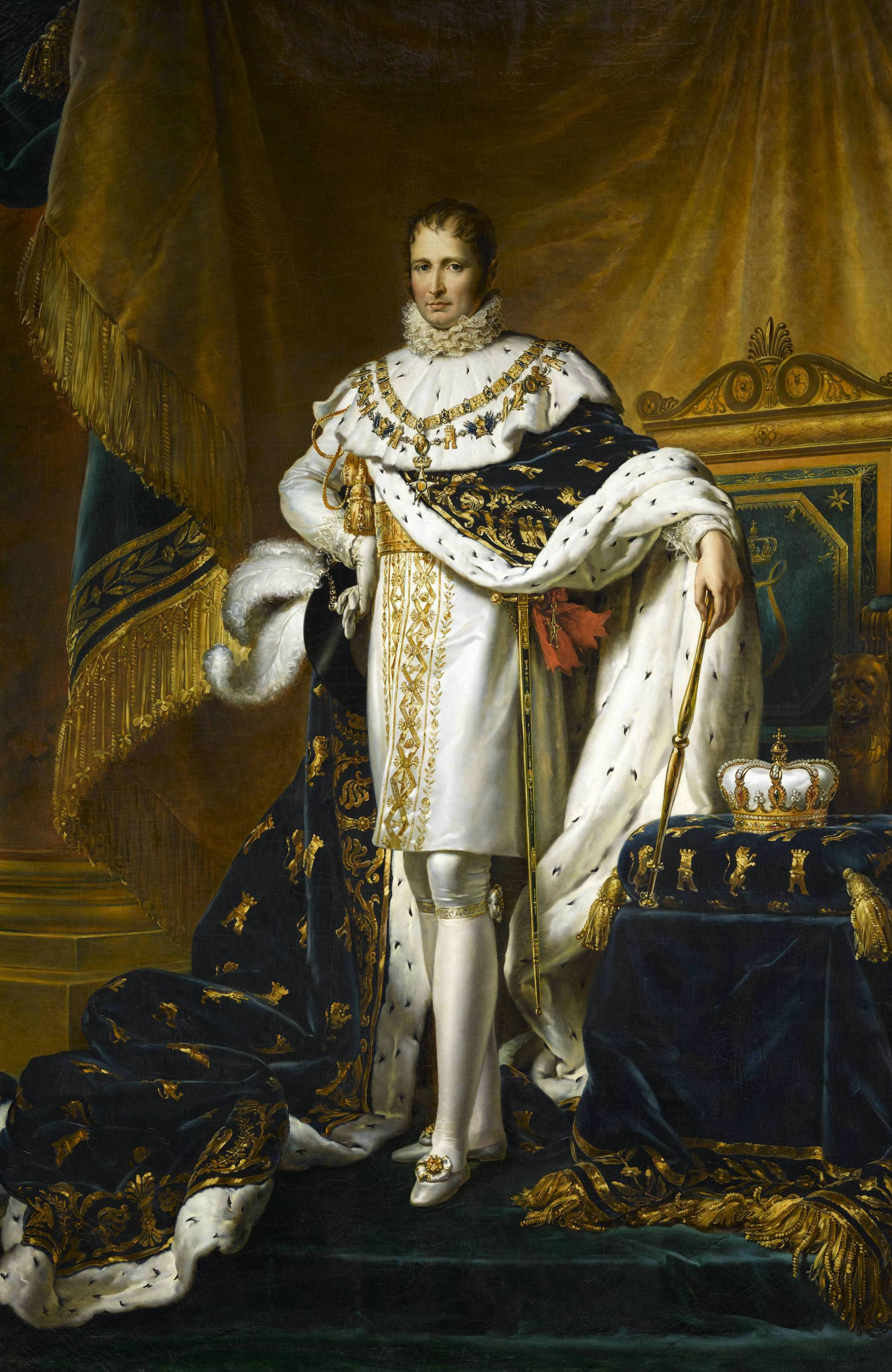
Joseph I of Spain conferred the title "Prince of Spain" to be hereditary on his children and grandchildren in the male and female line.

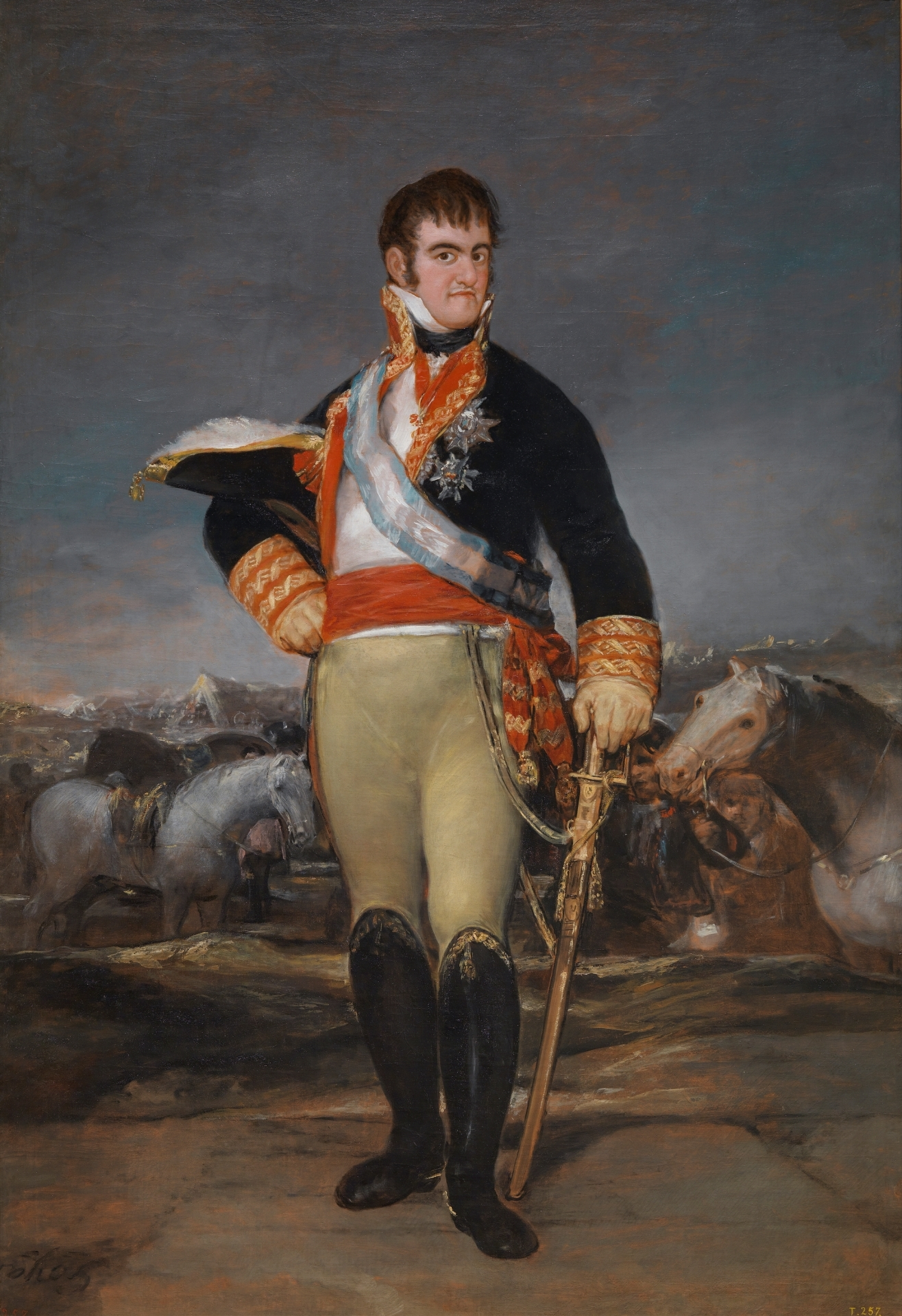
Ferdinand VII of Spain

The Josephine State had its legal basis in the Bayonne Statute.

When Ferdinand VII left Bayonne, in May 1808, he asked that all institutions co-operate with the French authorities. On 15 June 1808 Joseph Bonaparte, the elder brother of Napoleon I was made King. The Council of Castile assembled in Bayonne, though only 65 of the total 150 members attended. The Assembly ratified the transfer of the Crown to Joseph Bonaparte and adopted with little change apart from a constitutional text drafted by Napoleon I. Most of those assembled did not perceive any contradiction between patriotism and collaboration with the new king. Moreover, it was not the first time a foreign dynasty had assumed the Spanish Crown: at the start of the eighteenth century, the House of Bourbon came to Spain from France after the last of the Spanish Habsburgs, Charles II, died without offspring.

Napoleon Bonaparte and Joseph Bonaparte both underestimated the level of opposition that the appointment would create. Having successfully appointed Joseph I King of Naples in 1806 and other family rulers in Holland in 1806 and Westphalia in 1807, it came as a surprise to have created a political and later military disaster.

Joseph Bonaparte promulgated the Bayonne Statute on 7 July 1808. As a constitutional text, it is a royal charter, because it was not the result of a sovereign act of the nation assembled in Parliament, but a royal edict. The text was imbued with a spirit of reform, in line with the Bonaparte ideals, but adapted to the Spanish culture so as to win the support of the elites of the old regime. It recognized the Catholic religion as the official religion and forbade the exercise of other religions. It did not contain an explicit statement about the separation of powers, but asserted the independence of the judiciary. Executive power lay in the King and his ministers. The courts, in the manner of the old regime, were constituted of the estates of the clergy, the nobility and the people. Except with regard to the budget, its ability to make laws was influenced by the power of the monarch. In fact, the King was only forced to call Parliament every three years. It contained no explicit references to legal equality of citizens, although it was implicit in the equality in taxation, the abolition of privileges and equal rights between Spanish and American citizens. The Constitution also recognized the freedom of industry and trade, the abolition of trade privileges and the elimination of internal customs.

The Constitution established the Cortes Generales, an advisory body composed of the Senate which was formed by the male members of the royal family and 24 members appointed by the king from the nobles and the clergy, and a legislative assembly, with representatives from the estates of the nobility and the clergy. The Constitution established an authoritarian regime that included some enlightened projects, such as the abolition of torture, but preserving the Inquisition.

The Spanish uprising resulted in the Battle of Bailén on 16–19 July 1808, which resulted in a French defeat and Joseph I with the French high command fleeing Madrid and abandoning much of Spain.

During his stay in Vitoria, Joseph Bonaparte had taken important steps to organize the state institutions, including creating an advisory Council of State. The king appointed a government, whose leaders formed an enlightened group which adopted a reform program. The Inquisition was abolished, as was the Council of Castile which was accused of anti-French policy. He decreed the end of feudal rights, the reduction of religious communities and the abolition of internal customs charges.

This period saw measures to liberalize trade and agriculture and the creation of a stock exchange in Madrid. The State Council undertook the division of land into 38 provinces.

As the popular revolt against Joseph I spread, many who had initially co-operated with the House of Bonaparte left their ranks. But there remained numerous Spanish, known as afrancesados, who nurtured his administration and made the Peninsular War partially a civil war. The afrancesados saw themselves as heirs of enlightened absolutism and saw the arrival of Bonaparte as an opportunity to modernize the country. Many had been a part of government in the reign of Charles IV, for example, François Cabarrus, former head of finance and Mariano Luis de Urquijo, Secretary of State from November 1808 to April 1811. But there were also writers like playwright Leandro Fernández de Moratín, scholars like Juan Antonio Llorente, the mathematician Alberto Lista, and musicians such as Fernando Sor.

Throughout the war, Joseph I tried to exercise full authority as the King of Spain, preserving some autonomy against the designs of his brother Napoleon I. In this regard, many afrancesados believed that the only way to maintain national independence was to collaborate with the new dynasty, as the greater the resistance to the French, the greater would be the subordination of Spain to the French Imperial Army and its war requirements. In fact, the opposite was the case: although in the territory controlled by King Joseph I modern rational administration and institutions replaced the Old Regime, the permanent state of war reinforced the power of the French marshals, barely allowing the civil authorities to act.

The military defeats suffered by the French Imperial Army forced Joseph I to leave Madrid on three occasions:

1. In July 1808, following the Battle of Bailén, until it was recaptured by the French in November.
2. In August 1812, following the Battle of Salamanca, until the Allies abandoned Madrid on 2 November 1812.
3. In May 1813 for the last time, following the Battle of Vitoria; Joseph permanently left Spain in June. Most of his supporters (numbering between 10,000 and 12,000 people) went into exile in France along with retreating French troops, and their property was confiscated. Joseph abdicated.

=== Post-abdication ===
Joseph Bonaparte spent time in France, he commanded the Battle of Paris, then travelling to the United States (where he sold the jewels he had taken from Spain). He lived there from 1817 to 1832, initially in New York City and Philadelphia, where his house became the center of activity for French expatriates, he married American Ann Savage in Society Hill.

Joseph Bonaparte returned to Europe, where he died in Florence, Tuscany (present day Italy), and was buried in the Les Invalides building complex in Paris, France.

== Spanish colonial affairs ==
The Spanish world rejected Napoleon placing his brother Joseph on the Spanish throne. The instability caused by this event had the effect of Spanish America forming their own Juntas. Many of the newly formed Juntas did not recognize the claim of other Juntas claiming authority over the empire.

With the formation of the Supreme Central Junta in 1808, it was agreed that the kingdoms on the peninsula would send 2 representatives while the overseas kingdoms would only send 1. The overseas kingdoms were defined as "the viceroyalties of New Spain (Mexico), Peru, New Granada (Colombia), and Buenos Aires, and the independent captaincies general of the island of Cuba, Puerto Rico, Guatemala, Chile, Province of Venezuela, and the Philippines." Spanish America criticized the unequal representation but would participate until the Junta's disillusion in 1810.

When the government would move to Cadiz, many local juntas formed in the colonies. These juntas would have limited success only in New Granada, Venezuela, Chile, and Río de la Plata (Argentina). Most of Spanish America would remain loyal, participating in the Cortes of Cádiz.

== Second government of Spain – Cortes of Cádiz ==
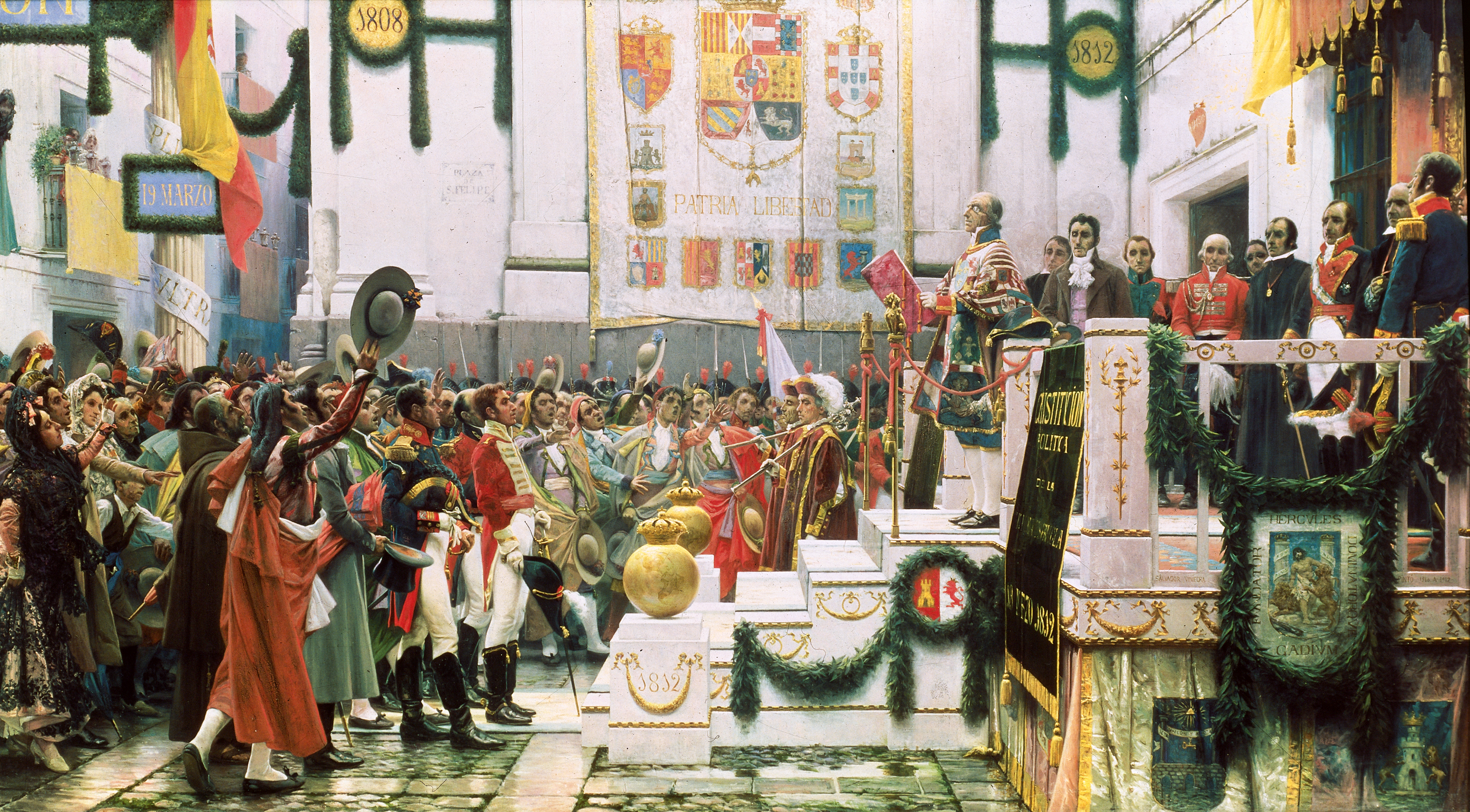
The Cortes of Cádiz

In 1810, the Cortes of Cádiz was created, operating as a government in exile. The Cortes Generales had to move from Seville to Cádiz to escape the French advance (The French enforced the Siege of Cádiz from 5 February 1810 to 24 August 1812, and the port city never surrendered). Its members disbanded and transferred its powers to a Council of Regency. The five regents convened the meeting of the Cortes in Cadiz. Cortes were representatives of the estates but were unable to hold elections either in Spain or in the American colonies. The assembly thus lost its estates in favor of territorial representation.

=== The Constitution of Cádiz ===
The Cortes opened their sessions in September 1810 on the Isla de León. They consisted of 97 deputies, 47 of whom were alternates from Cádiz residents, who approved a decree expressing represent the Spanish nation and declared legally constituted in general and special courts in which lay the national sovereignty.

Upon returning to Spain, the Cortes of Cádiz would invite Ferdinand VII to meet with them in Madrid. Ferdinand VII would instead stay at Valencia with officers that shared his views on the Cortes and the new constitution. On May 4, 1814, while still in Valencia Ferdinand would abolish the constitution and reinstate an absolute monarchy.

== The Allied victory ==
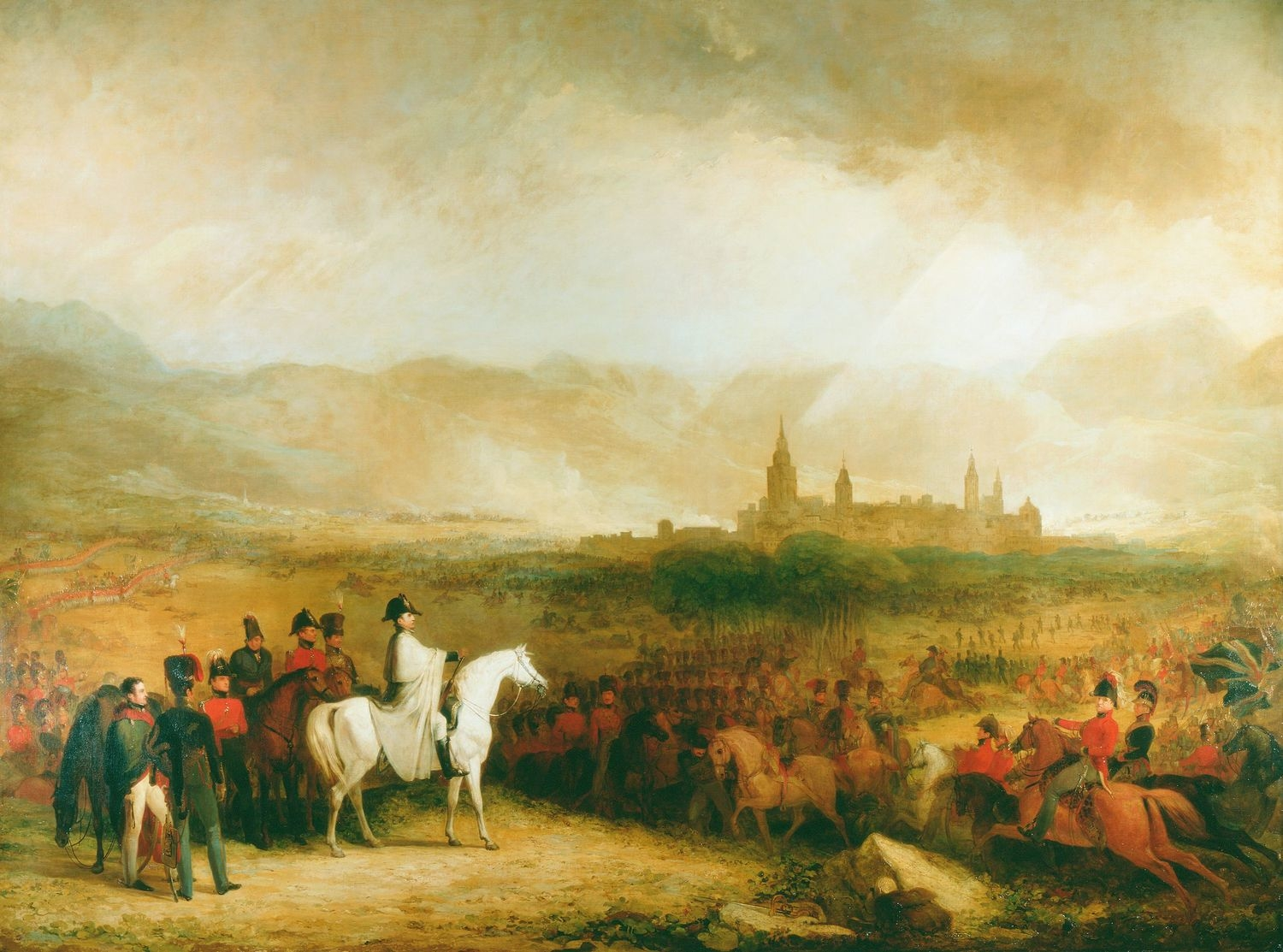
The Battle of Vittoria by George Jones, 1822.

In March 1813, threatened by the Anglo-Spanish army, Joseph I had left the capital and the Coalition offensive intensified and culminated in the Battle of Vitoria in June. French troops were finally evicted from Spain following the conclusion of the Siege of San Sebastián in September 1813, so removing any possibility of a return. In December 1813, the Treaty of Valençay provided for the restoration of Ferdinand VII.

== See also ==
- History of Spain
- Peninsular War
- Timeline of the Peninsular War
- Napoleonic Wars
- Afrancesados
