= Alfaro, La Rioja =

Alfaro
- Municipality
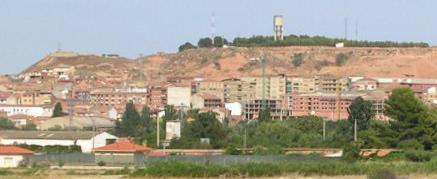
- View of Alfaro

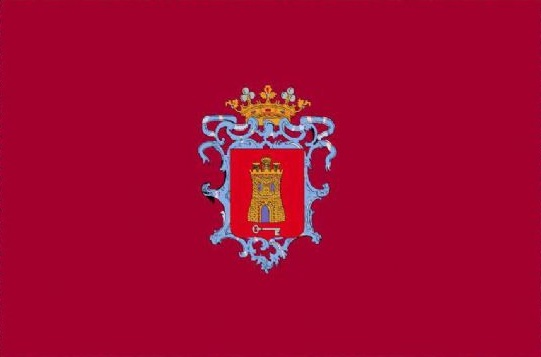
- Flag Coat of arms

- Location within La Rioja.

- Location in La Rioja Location in Spain
- Coordinates: 42°10′41″N 1°44′56″W
- Country: Spain
- Autonomous community: La Rioja
- Comarca: Alfaro

Area
  - Total: 194.23 km^{2} (74.99 sq mi)
- Elevation: 310 m (1,020 ft)

Population (2025-01-01)
  - Total: 9,923
  - Density: 51.09/km^{2} (132.3/sq mi)
- Time zone: UTC+1 (CET)
  - Summer (DST): UTC+2 (CET)
- Website: Official website

Alfaro is a town and municipality in La Rioja, northern Spain. Its population in January 2009 was 9,883 inhabitants, and its area is 194.23 km^{2}. It is known for the annual return and nesting of the 'Storks of Alfaro.'

During ancient Roman times, Alfaro was a municipium known as Graccuris; named after Tiberius Sempronius Gracchus.

== Politics ==
Mayors of Alfaro since 1956
Term	Mayor	Political Party
1956	Manuel Navajas Llorente	—
1956	Enrique Tosantos Salazar	—
1956 - 1957	Manuel Castillo Castillo	—
1957 - 1958	José Ignacio de la Torre Belsué	—
1958 - 1959	Victorianos Ruiz Ramos	—
1959 - 1971	Emilio Bustamante Martín	—
1971 - 1972	Félix Arbizu Lestau	—
1972 - 1974	Eugenio Hernández Varea	—
1974 - 1977	Mariano Cuartero Ezpeleta	—
1977 - 1979	José Luis Prusen Vicente	—

List of mayors since the democratic elections of 1979
Term	Mayor	Political party
1979–1983	Antonio Rodríguez Basulto	UCD
1983–1987	Julián Jiménez Velilla	PSOE
1987–1991	Julián Jiménez Velilla	PSOE
1991–1995	Julián Jiménez Velilla	PSOE
1995–1999	Clemente Bea Segura	PP
1999–2003	María Concepción Iribar Fernández	PP
2003–2007	Tomás Martínez	PSOE
2007–2011	Tomás Martínez	PSOE
2011–2015	María Yolanda Preciado Moreno	PP
2015–2019	María Yolanda Preciado Moreno	PP
2019–2023	Julián Jiménez Velilla	PSOE
2023–	María Yolanda Preciado Moreno	PP

== Landmarks ==
- Collegiate of San Miguel Arcángel, Alfaro
- Church of Nuestra Señora del Burgo
- Plaza de Toros de Alfaro

== Festivals ==
Festival dates in Alfaro:

- Storks Day - during the first weekend in February
- San Isidro—Spring Festival - May 15
- San Roque—Summer Festival - August 14
- Holy Mary Burgo—September Festival - September 9

== Gallery ==
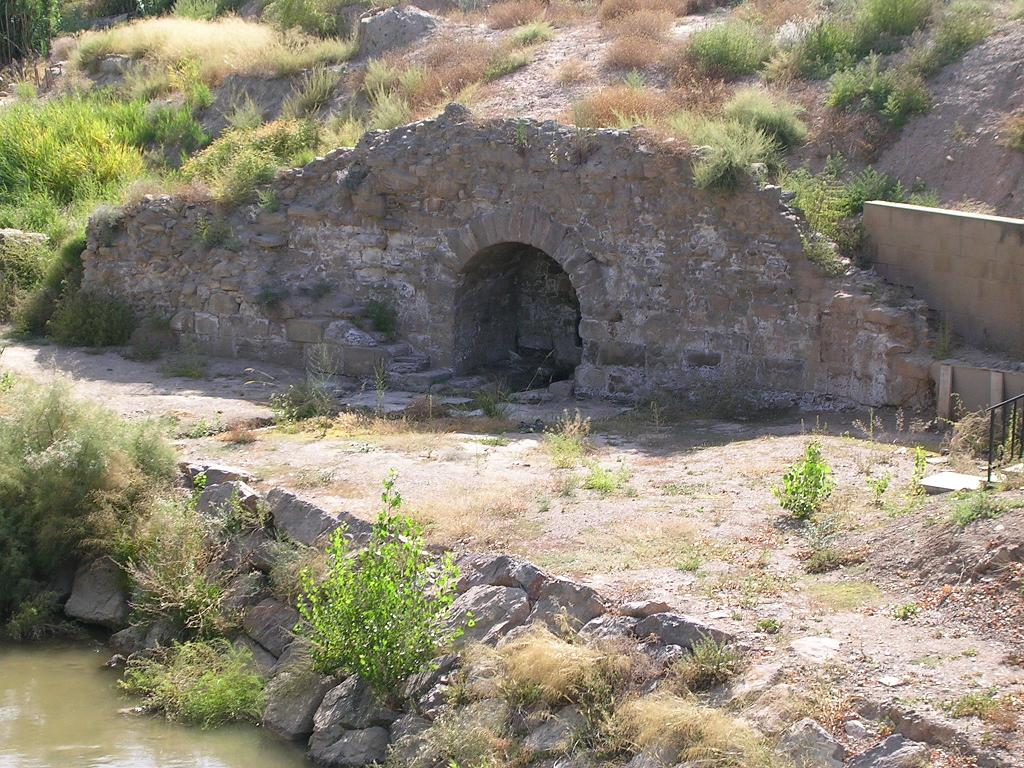
Roman Nymphaeum in Alfaro

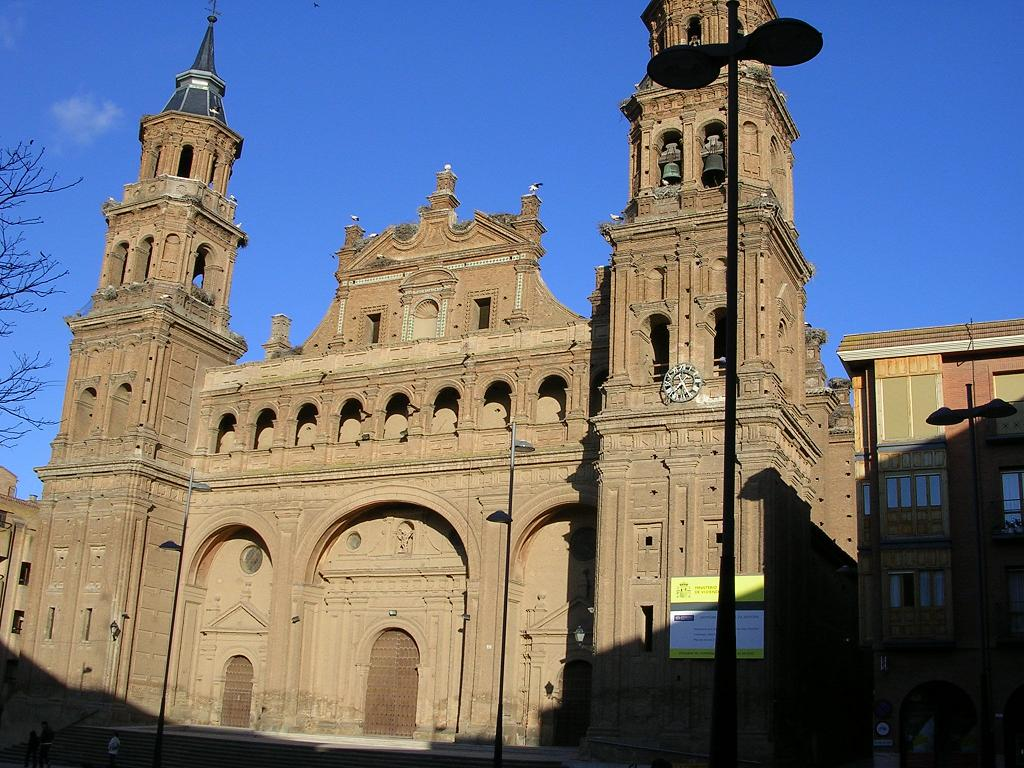
Collegiate of San Miguel Arcángel—Saint Michael's church, Alfaro

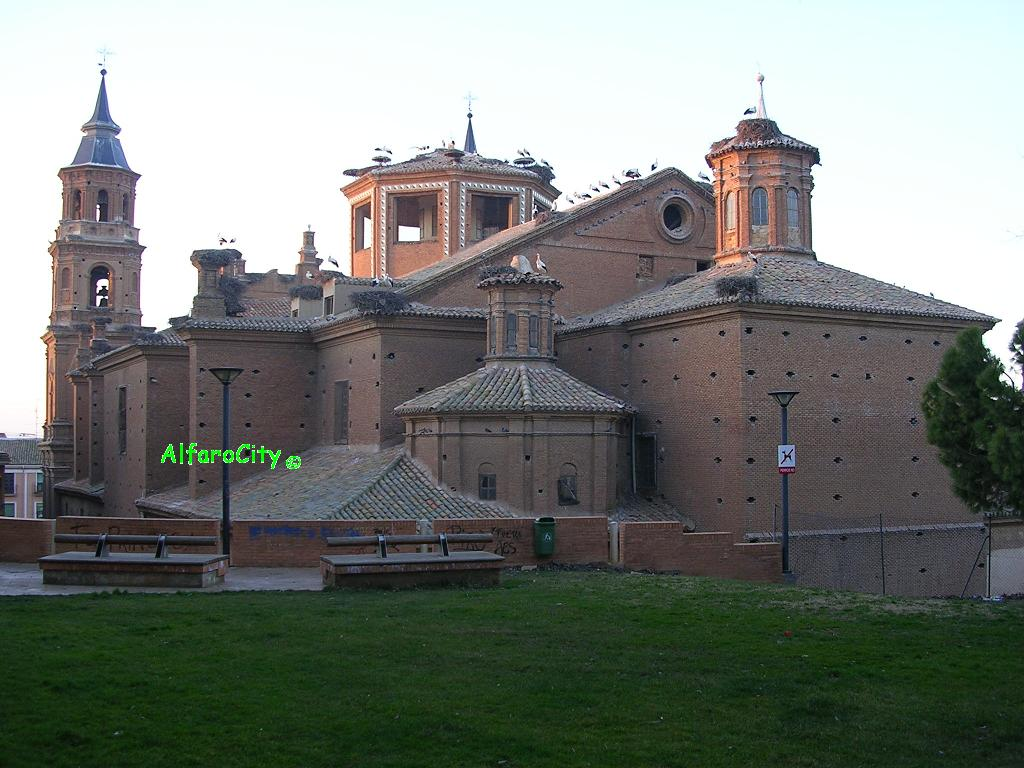
Collegiate of San Miguel Arcángel, rear elevation

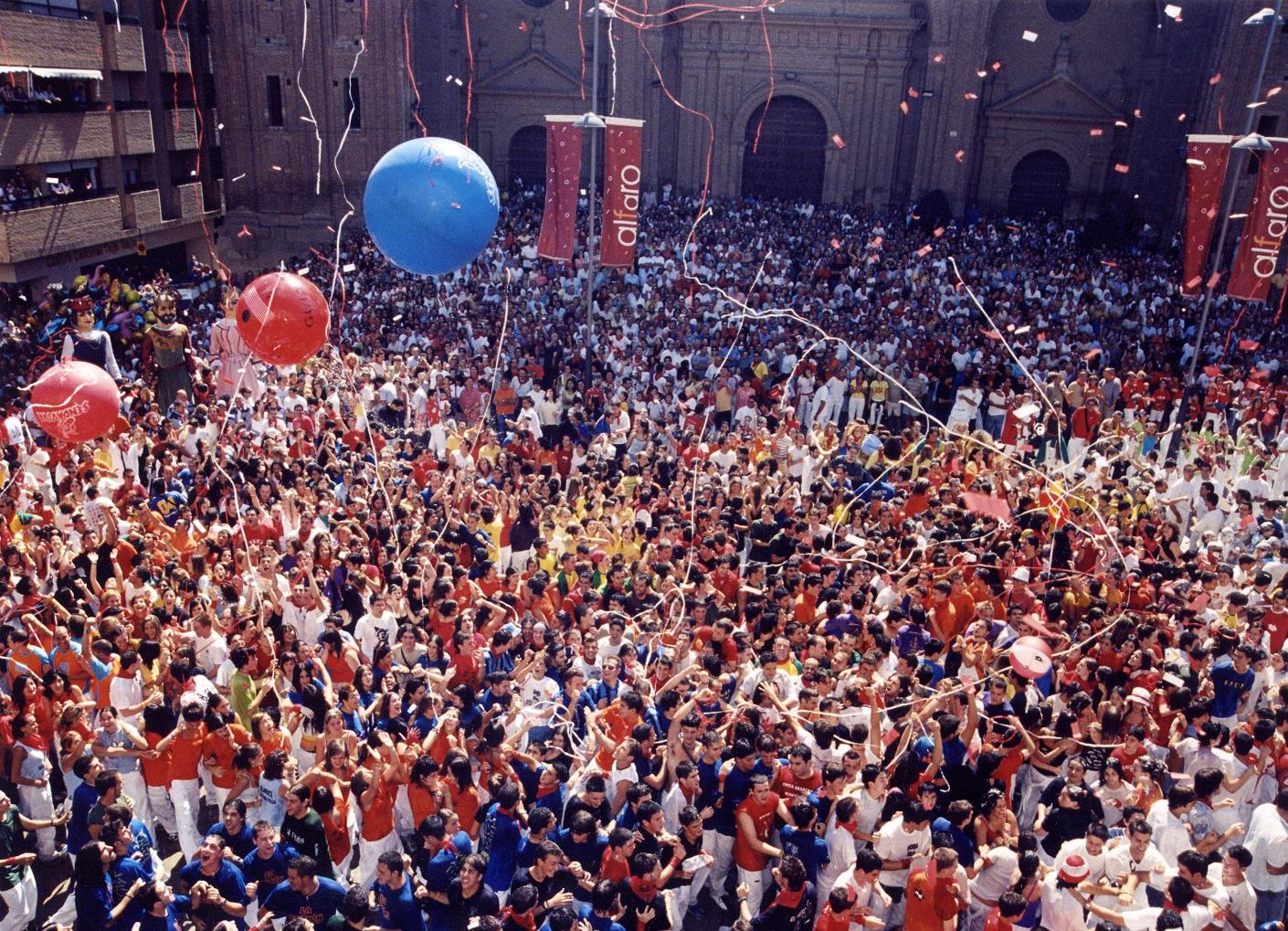
Festival in Alfaro
