= Manuel Silvela y García de Aragón =

Spanish writer, lawyer and magistrate

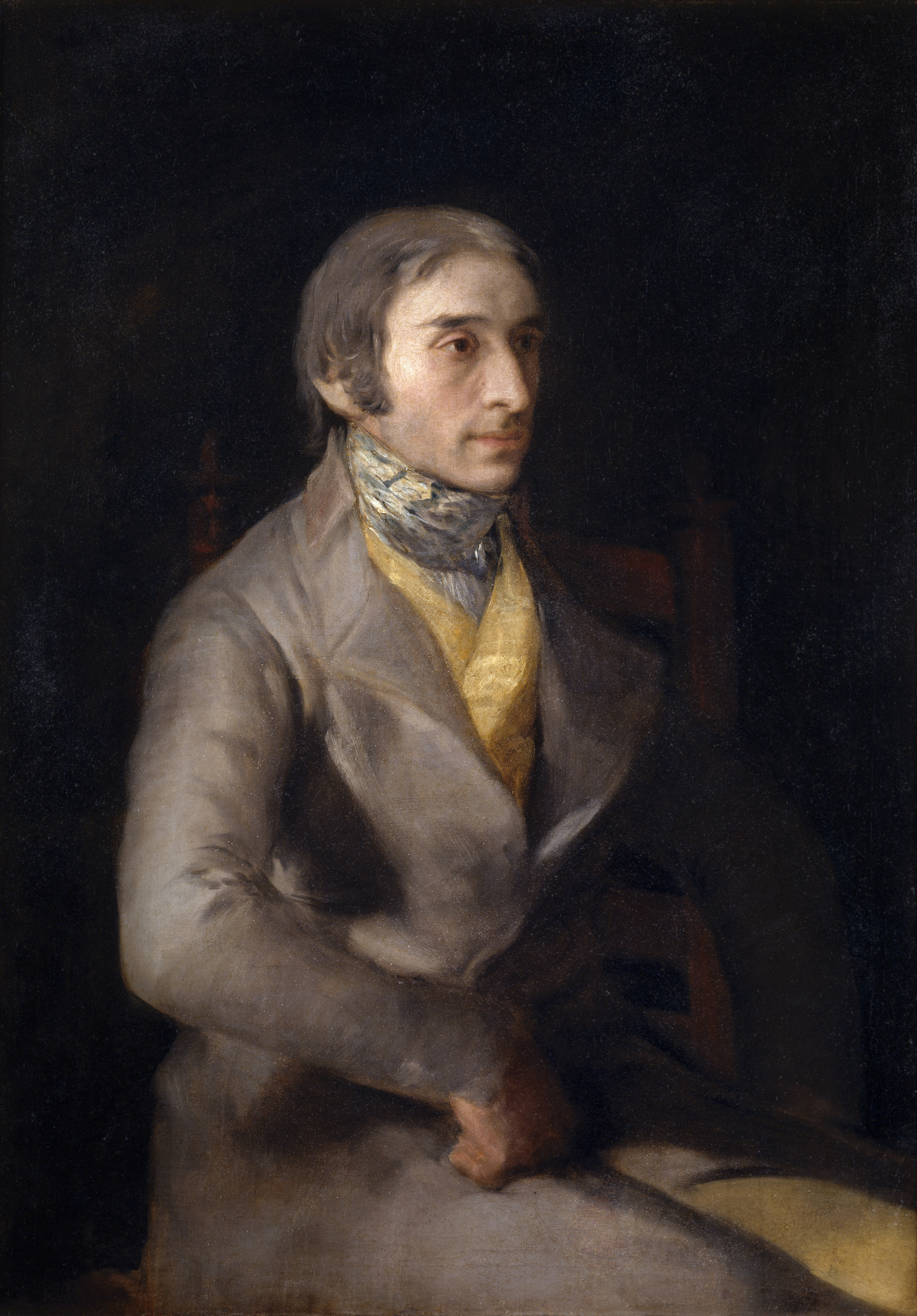
- Manuel Silvela; portrait by Francisco de Goya (c.1809)
- Born: 31 October 1781; Valladolid, Spain
- Died: 9 May 1832 (aged 50); Batignolles-Monceau, France
- Occupations: Writer, Lawyer, Magistrate
- Children: Francisco Agustín Silvela y Casado
- Relatives: Francisco Silvela, Manuel Silvela (grandsons)

Manuel Silvela y García de Aragón (31 October 1781 – 9 May 1832) was a Spanish writer, lawyer and magistrate.

== Biography ==
At the age of six, he became an orphan and was taken to Ávila to be raised by an aunt. He began his primary education there. Later, he returned to Valladolid after completing his studies in jurisprudence, philosophy and theology. In 1806, he received his bachelor's degree and, shortly after, became a Licentiate in Laws and Canons. He received his PhD in 1808.

He joined the Sociedad Económica de los Amigos del País and served as their secretary, contributing to improvements in the public schools, as well as agriculture and industry. He also collaborated with the lawyers at the Royal Audiencia and Chancillería of Valladolid. But, unable to join the local Bar Association, due to a restricted number of memberships, he moved to Madrid.

His arrival there coincided with the French invasion and the installation of Joseph I as King. Rather than becoming engaged in legal work, his knowledge of French kept him busy as a liaison between local officials and the new government. Eventually, at the age of 27, he accepted an appointment as magistrate in the Sala de Alcaldes de la Casa y Corte, a judicial and administrative body dating from the 13th century, without clearly defined powers.

He did his best to achieve justice for the powerless; especially those charged with political crimes. Nevertheless, he was accused of being "Afrancesado" (Frenchified) and, when the French Court evacuated Madrid in 1812, he took his family to Bordeaux, fearing for their safety, despite assurances from prominent people that everything would be all right.

While there, he established the "Colegio Silvela", which became a major school for people from Spain and Latin-America. He shared his exile with Leandro Fernández de Moratín, who helped him with his playwriting, and Francisco de Goya, who had earlier painted his portrait. During the Trienio Liberal, he was invited to return to Spain, but felt committed to his teaching and publishing enterprises in France, so he remained there.

In 1827, he moved to Paris, where he founded another school, serving as its director while teaching several classes and creating textbooks. The following year, he contracted an unspecified lung disease that led to his death in 1832.

His son, Francisco Agustín, became a well known lawyer and politician, serving briefly as Minister of the Interior. His grandsons, Francisco and Manuel both became Ministers of State.

== Available works ==
- Biblioteca selecta de literatura española, ó Modelos de elocuencia y poesía, tomados de los escritores más célebres, desde el siglo XIV hasta nuestros días, Lawalle jóven y sobrino, 1819
- Correspondencia de un refujiado con un amigo suyo de Madrid, Lawalle jóven y sobrino, 1820
- Una cuestión de derecho, Gaultier-Laguionie, 1829
- En mi cumpleaños de mil ochocientos veinte y nueve, Gaultier-Laguionie, 1829
