= Francisco Agustín Silvela y Blanco =

Spanish exile who returned to become a lawyer and politician

Francisco Agustín Silvela y Blanco (28 August 1803 – 20 September 1857) was a Spanish exile who returned to become a prominent lawyer and politician following the turmoil after the Peninsular War and restoration of the House of Bourbon in Spain following the French occupation.

== Biography ==
Francisco Agustín Silvela y Blanco was born and baptized in Valladolid, Parish of Santiago on 28 August 1803. He was the son of the writer and Spanish judge Manuel Silvela y García de Aragón, and was, in the words of his father, his "right arm and repository of all my dreams."

Don ('sir') Manuel Silvela, father of Francisco Agustín, had accepted the position of governor of the Royal Household and Royal Court (government) during the French occupation and, although he was to save the lives of thousands of Spanish compatriots, the office was cause enough to merit the appellation "Frenchified" with a meaning similar to "Quisling" which forced him to emigrate to save his life.

Francisco Agustín accompanied his parents into exile in Bordeaux, France. Francisco Augustine was hard-working and highly educated. In 1825 he attained the degree of Bachelor of Arts from the Royal Academy of Bordeaux and in 1833 a degree in Law from the University of Paris. He was a member of the Society of Universal Statistics of Madrid, Fellow of the Spanish Royal Academy of Sciences and several other illustrious institutions including a Professorship of Humanities in Bordeaux, taught Ancient and Modern History and Greek language in various educational establishments and held the Royal Academic medal of Honour for Mathematics and Fine Arts from La Universidad de la Purísima Concepción de Valladolid

He was married in the Church of St. Severin of Bordeaux on 30 June 1827 to Luisa María Antonieta Sotés Le Vielleuze the daughter of Colonel of the Regiment of Asturias Don Luis de Le Vielleuze, who was of Belgian descent.

After the death of his father, Francisco Agustín returned to Spain with his family, where he held important positions in the administration of the time.

In 1843 the Duke of Bailen (Regent of the future Isabella II of Spain) was appointed Governor of the Royal Household and Royal Heritage, on the occasion of the declaration of the coming of age Isabel, was appointed a Gentleman of the Royal Bedchamber.

He died in Madrid on 20 September 1857 and was buried in the cemetery of the Sacramental de San Isidro in Madrid.

== Politics ==
In exile in France Francisco Agustín attracted general sympathy among Spanish immigrants of all persuasions, notably the former 'josefino' sympathiser Don Francisco Javier de Burgos, also a refugee in France. The Burgos children and Francisco Agustín were educated in the same school. Upon the death of Ferdinand VII of Spain in 1833, Burgos was appointed Secretary of the Development Office of the Queen Regent, María Cristina.

Javier de Burgos continued to extend his patronage to Manuel Silvela and to his son Francisco Agustín.

In December 1833, Francisco Agustín started his administrative career when he was appointed Secretary for the office of Public Works in the province of Pontevedra, and occasionally acted as Secretary of Public Works in Avila. After three years he joined the Civil Government of Castellón de la Plana. Upon relinquishing that post he left his house and furnishings to the community as 'Casa de Expósitos'. A year later he was appointed political chief of Valencia and La Coruña.

Francisco Agustín then joined the Civil Government of Lleida, and later served on the staff of the Ministry of the Interior as a Member of the Advisory Board and Head of Section of the Ministry.

On 5 December 1838, at a time of great political turmoil, he was appointed Minister of the Interior of a somewhat ephemeral government cabinet, then, after the revolution of 1840, in a time of grace and justice, Don Valentín Ferraz y Barrau a soldier who became both Mayor of Madrid and prime minister of the Spanish Government. The courts agreed to allow Francisco Agustín to continue all the ministerial projects he had initiated.

Between 1837 and 1847 he was elected representative (deputy in the lower house of parliament) for Avila several times, and was finally appointed Vice President of the Congress of Deputies.

In 1847 he was appointed to the upper house of parliament as Senator for Life.

== Legal career ==
Francisco Agustín was admitted as a lawyer of the Courts of the Kingdom of Spain in 1835 entering the Bar Association of Madrid three years later.

In 1839 he was appointed Judge of the Court of A Coruña and in 1841 Judge of Valladolid, in 1843 rising to Supreme Court Judge and Chairman of the Board of the (Spanish Government of) Indies in 1853.

In 1850 he was appointed Chairman of the Board of Governors of the Judges of First Instance.

== Successors ==
Francisco Agustín Silvela and Maria Antoinette had four children: Manuel, Victoria, Luis y Francisco. All three boys were to reach high positions in the government and the administration of their time

== Publications ==
- "A question of law", Paris 1829
- "Considerations on the need to retain and apply the death penalty in some cases", Madrid 1835
- "Draft Electoral Law", Lleida 1836
- "Proposition of law relating to the jurisdiction, powers, organization procedures for the Senate and Court" Madrid 1847
- "Collection of projects, reports, studies of organic (enabling) laws and administrative practice", Madrid 1839
