= Royal Order of Spain =

Order of knighthood of the Kingdom of Spain

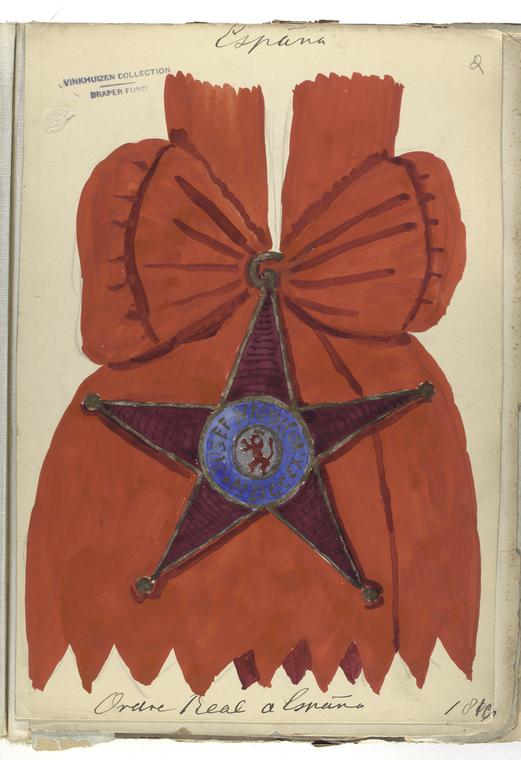
- Cross and sash of the order as depicted in the Vinkhuijzen Collection

Awarded by the King of Spain
- Type: State Order
- Established: 20 October 1808
- Royal house: House of Bonaparte
- Motto: Virtute et Fide
- Awarded for: Bravery on the battlefield as well as for civilian accomplishments
- Status: Obsolete
- Founder: Joseph Bonaparte
- Grades: Grand cross (grand cordon); Commander (commandeur); Knight (chevalier)
- Ribbon of the order

The Royal Order of Spain, originally founded as Ordre royal d'Espagne is an extinct order of knighthood of the Kingdom of Spain founded by Joseph Bonaparte.

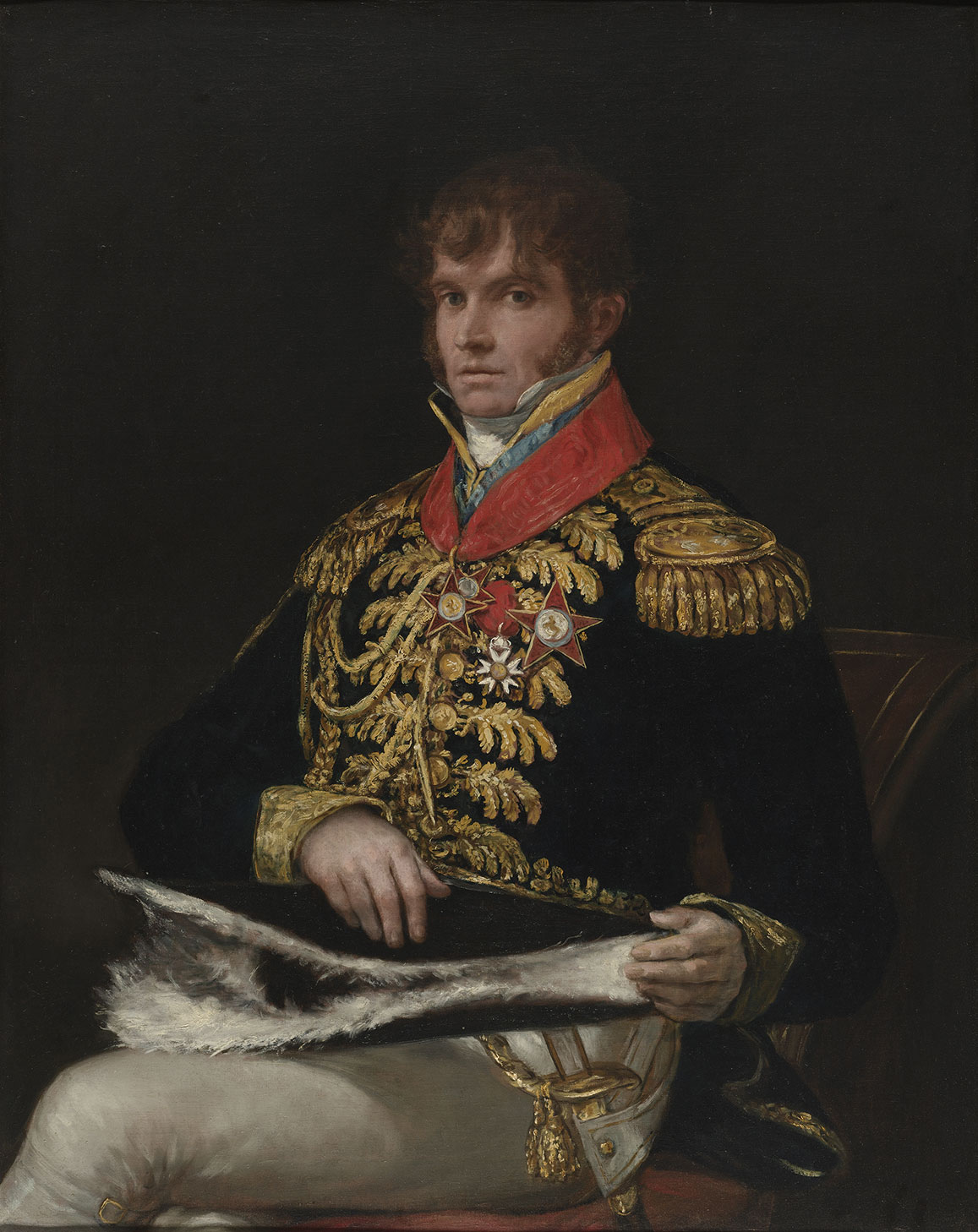
Nicolás Guye wearing the neck insignia and Grand Cross of the order, 1810

== History ==
The Royal Order of Spain was founded by King Joseph I of Spain on 20 October 1808, under the name of royal and military order (’ordre royal et militaire) to be awarded for bravery on the battlefield as well as for civilian accomplishments. It had three classes: grand cross (grand cordon); commander (commandeur) and knight (chevalier).

The order was abolished by King Ferdinand VII in 1814.

== Members ==
=== Grands cordons ===
- Miguel José de Azanza
- Baron Jean Baptiste Alexandre Strolz (15 February 1811)
- General Antoine de Roten

=== Commandeurs ===
- Antoine Aymard
- Juan Antonio Llorente
- Guillaume Balestrier, colonel of the Régiment Royal-Irlandais (Kingdom of Spain)
- Joseph Léopold Sigisbert Hugo
- François Joseph Marie Clary (1786–1841)

=== Chevaliers ===
- Alexis-François Aulagnier
- Domingo de Cabarrús y Galabert (11 March 1810)
- Leandro Fernández de Moratín
- Francisco de Goya
- Jean-Baptiste Auguste Marie Jamin (19 November 1810)
- Louis-Joseph Hugo (25 October 1809)
- François-Juste Hugo
- Luis Marcelino Pereira (27 October 1809)
