= Juan Antonio Llorente =

Spanish historian (1756–1823)

Juan Antonio Llorente ORE
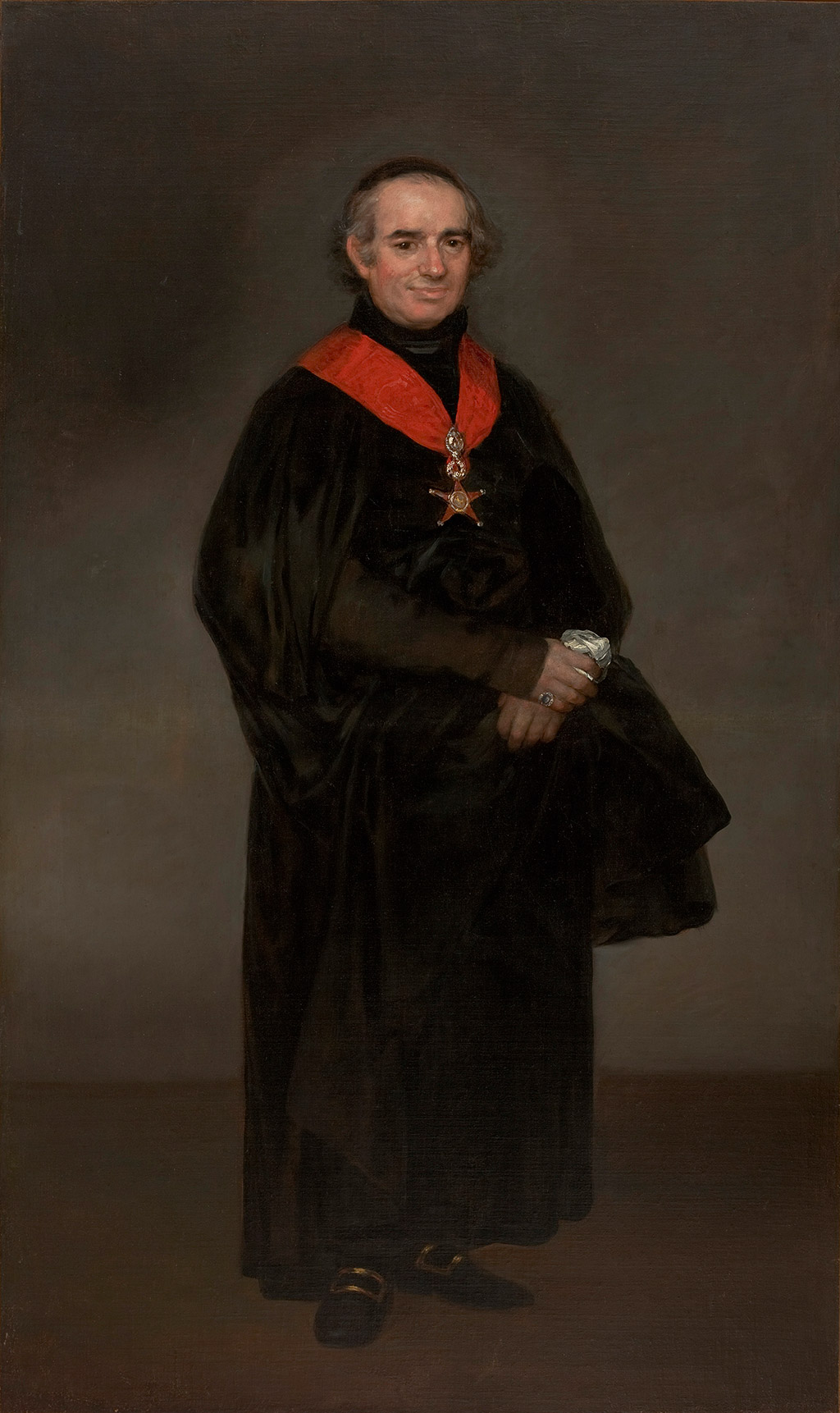
- Portrait of Don Juan Antonio Llorente by Francisco Goya (1809–1813)
- Born: 30 March 1756; Rincón de Soto (La Rioja), Spain
- Died: 5 February 1823 (aged 66); Madrid, Spain
- Education: University of Zaragoza
- Occupation: Historian

Juan Antonio Llorente, ORE (30 March 1756 in Rincón de Soto (La Rioja), Spain – 5 February 1823 in Madrid) was a Spanish historian.

== Biography ==
Llorente was raised by an uncle after his parents died. He studied at the University of Zaragoza, and, having been ordained priest, became vicar-general to the bishop of Calahorra in 1782. In 1785, he became commissary of the Holy Office (Inquisition) at Logroño and, in 1789, its general secretary at Madrid.

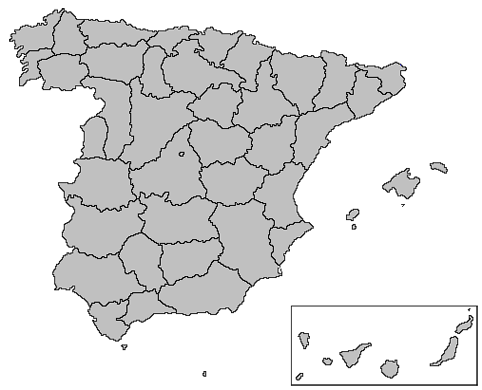
The prefectures of 1810.

In the crisis of 1808, Llorente identified himself with the Bonaparte regime and was engaged for a few years in superintending the execution of the decree for the suppression of the monastic orders, in examining the archives of the Spanish Inquisition and in arguing for the submission of the Spanish church to the Bonaparte monarch.

His 1810 project for a division of Spain in prefectures and subprefectures (under the French revolutionary inspiration) was never brought into practice because of the war. On the return of King Ferdinand VII to Spain in 1814, he retreated to France, where he published his great work, Historia critica de la inquisicion de España (Paris, 1817–1818). His works "were the first fully documented accounts of the Inquisition to have seen the light of day in over three hundred years of the tribunal's existence."

Translated into English, German, Dutch, and Italian, it attracted much attention in Europe and involved its author in considerable persecution. While Llorente was in France, the mob destroyed his Spanish residence and his library of over 8,000 rare books and manuscripts (some irreplaceable). After the coup of Rafael de Riego (1820), he supported the new Liberal government. The discovery of his Carbonarian activities and the publication of his Portraits politiques des papes in 1822 culminated in a peremptory order to leave France.

According to the Encyclopædia Britannica Eleventh Edition, both the personal character and the literary accuracy of Llorente have been assailed, but, although he was not an exact historian, there is no doubt, that he made an honest use of documents relating to the Inquisition which, in part, are no longer extant.

The English translation of the Historia (London, 1826) is abridged. Llorente also wrote Memorias para la historia de la revolución de España (Paris, 1814–1816), translated into French (Paris, 1815–1819); Noticias históricas de las tres provincias vascongadas (Madrid, 1806–1808); an autobiography, Noticia biográfica (Paris, 1818), and other works. Llorente's unpublished notes contributed a century later to the most reliable biography (by Gregorio Marañón) of Philip II's infamous secretary, Antonio Pérez.

== Book ==
The history of the Inquisition of Spain: From the time of its establishment to the reign of Ferdinand VII.
