= Treaty of Valençay =

1813 treaty between France and Spain

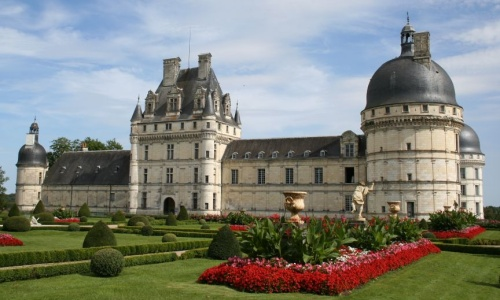
Chateau de Valençay.

The Treaty of Valençay was a proposed peace agreement between France and Spain, signed on 8 December 1813, aimed at ending the Peninsular War. It was drafted by Antoine René Mathurin for the French Empire and José Miguel de Carvajal y Manrique for the Spanish Crown. Named after the Château de Valençay, owned by former French foreign minister Charles Maurice de Talleyrand, the treaty sought to restore Ferdinand VII of Spain, who had been imprisoned by Napoleon since 1808, to the Spanish throne, which had been occupied by Joseph Bonaparte.

Napoleon Bonaparte, recognizing France's imminent defeat in the Peninsular War, intended the treaty as a step toward reestablishing an alliance with Spain and facilitating the withdrawal of French troops from Spanish territory. However, both parties harbored doubts about each other’s commitment to the agreement, and the armistice included in the treaty was never fully respected. It is also believed that in a secret protocol, Napoleon compelled Ferdinand VII to pledge that the Spanish Army would oppose British and Portuguese forces if they continued to use Spain as a base for military operations against France.

Despite these provisions, the treaty was repudiated by the Spanish Cortes of Cádiz upon Ferdinand's return to Madrid. The Peninsular War continued until Napoleon's ultimate defeat by the Sixth Coalition in 1814.

== See also ==
- List of treaties

== Bibliography ==
- Gates, David (2001). The Spanish Ulcer: A History of the Peninsular War. Da Capo Press. ISBN 0-306-81083-2
- Longford, Elizabeth (1969). Wellington: The Years of The Sword. New York: Harper and Row Publishers
