= Juan Sempere y Guarinos =

Spanish politician, jurist, bibliographer, economist and writer

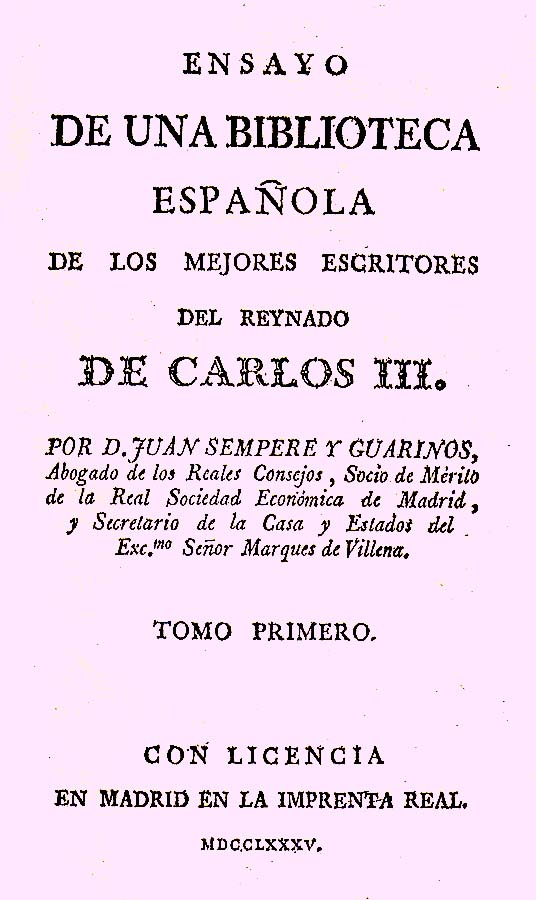
Los mejores escritores del Reinado de Carlos III (The best writers in the Reign of Charles III)

Juan Sempere y Guarinos (Elda , 8 April 1754– Elda, 18 October 1830) was a Spanish politician, jurist, bibliographer, economist and writer.

== Biography ==
He was born into a family of the gentry, related to the Count of Elda and the Sampere family of Villena. He studied at the University of Orihuela and completed the four-year internship as secretary to Felipe Torres Pacheco, Marquis of Villena. The Marquis’s patronage was instrumental in introducing him to court life, facilitating his first encounter with the works of Gregorio Mayans and Campomanes, and shaping his future political orientation.

On 16 December 1789, he was appointed to the criminal prosecution office at the Chancery of Granada and in mid-February 1790 as civil prosecutor. When Granada was captured by French General Sebastiani’s troops on 28 January 1810, Juan Sempere held a position as a member of the Finance Committee within the newly formed Supreme Junta of Granada and was responsible for military logistics and the administration of public grain stores.
At this point, he swore allegiance to the invaders. Whatever the reason that drove him to join the "Josephine" cause, whether out of genuine conviction or fear of reprisal, it undoubtedly greatly facilitated his professional advancement. During the final months of the occupation, he solidified his role as a prosecutor for the Board of Contentious Affairs ("Junta de Negocios Contenciosos") in Madrid, and on 16 July 1812, he reached the pinnacle of his success by becoming a supernumerary member of the Royal Academy of History.

However, his career suffered a severe setback at the end of the conflict. Much of his property was confiscated and he was forced to flee to France. This marked the beginning of a long, arduous journey of exiles (1813 and 1823) and returns (1820 and 1826) that would shape his works for the rest of his life.

He was 72 years old when he was allowed to return to his hometown of Elda on 26 May 1827. He died there three years later.
