= Pablo de Jérica =

Spanish writer and journalist

Pablo de Jérica (Vitoria-Gasteiz, 15 January 1781 – Cagnotte, France, 9 March 1841) was a Spanish writer and journalist.

== Biography ==
The oldest child in a merchant family, Jérica studied philosophy in the Dominican convent of his native city. While preparing to study law at the University of Oñate, he completed a translation of Ovid's Heroides. In 1804 he printed his Humorous stories in different Castilian meters (Valencia, 1804) and moved to Cádiz to run the family business. There he created a dramatic translation of Picard's The puppets, or what can interest from French (Cádiz, Quintana printing press, 1807), and learned Italian, English and Portuguese. He contributed to El Redactor General newspaper giving his liberal opinions. He frequented the Café de la Esperanza 'tertulia' and, between 1811 and 1813, he wrote for El Diario Mercantil de Cádiz under the initials "P.J and C.".

In 1813, he moved to A Coruña, where he had some refugee friends like Valentin de Foronda and Marcelino Calero y Portocarrero, or liberal intellectuals like Manuel Pardo de Andrade, coinciding with the writing of El Ciudadano por la Constitución. In his pages, as in the Cádiz journals, Jérica opted for an ideological combat poetry that would change the traditional mentality of the people attacking servility and the Inquisition. In A Coruña, Jérica became secretary of the Board of Censorship and Protection of the Freedom of Printing since November 1813. In early March of the following year he returned to his hometown and wrote for the Correo de Vitoria.

The persecution of the liberals that undid the Manifesto of the Persians, brought about a first trial for his activities in A Coruña, sentencing him to exile in Melilla for ten years and one day. A second trial, initiated by the publication of some articles in the Correo de Vitoria, sentenced him to six years of imprisonment in Pamplona. Nevertheless, he could escape from both sentences by hiding in Deva and fleeing later to Dax (France). Also his Ensayos poéticos (Valencia, 1814), contained some stories that he had published in 1804 and which were prohibited by the Inquisition. The Kingdom of Spain sent out constant requests for return in 1814, considering him a state prisoner. The French police tried to extradite him in 1817, when he resided in Bayonne (France). He was imprisoned on several occasions but finally released in Pau.

Returning to his native city when the Trienio Liberal (1820–1823) made it possible, he was commander of the Constitutional Volunteers, a member of the Censorship Board of the Provincial Council of Álava and finally, in 1823, constitutional mayor of Vitoria. But after the invasion of the "Hundred Thousand Sons of Saint Louis" (1823) he faced persecution and the banning of his poetry, which forced him into exile in France once again.
Becoming a naturalized Frenchman, he married Victoria de Caubotte, daughter of the Baroness of Castelnau, with whom he would have four children, and settled in Dax, where he continued his literary pursuits until his death in Cagnotte (near Dax) on 9 March 1841.
He published a Collection of stories, fables, descriptions, anecdotes and selected dialogues (Bordeaux, 1831), culled from various Baroque comedies, as well as an Instructive and entertaining Miscellany (Bordeaux, 1836) and Letrillas and Fables (Bordeaux, 1837) where he gathered the satirical work done in verse during his time as a journalist.

Jérica uses irony, satire and a great skill for the caricature, as well as costumbrismo art, not to entertain a reader who has no other requirement than to fill his leisure time, but to introduce his message of liberal revolution, hence his apparent inclination to festive literature. He was most prolific in the genre of the epigram in verse:

Aquí Fray Diego reposa;
en su vida hizo otra cosa.

translation:

Here Fray Diego rests;
In his life he did something else.

== Works ==
- Humorous stories in different Castilian meters, (Valencia, 1804).
- Poetic essays (Valencia, 1814 and Paris, 1817).
- Poems (Vitoria, 1822)
- Poems (Bordeaux, 1831)
- Collection of stories, fables, descriptions, anecdotes, dialogues selected (Bordeaux, 1831)
- Miscellaneous instructive and entertaining (Bordeaux, 1836)
- Letrillas and fables (Bordeaux, 1837)
- The puppets, or what can interest (Cádiz, 1807), prose comedy in five acts. translated from French.
- The servile or The new newspaper. Cádiz, 1811. Original comedy in one act.
