= Alberto Lista =

Spanish poet and educationalist

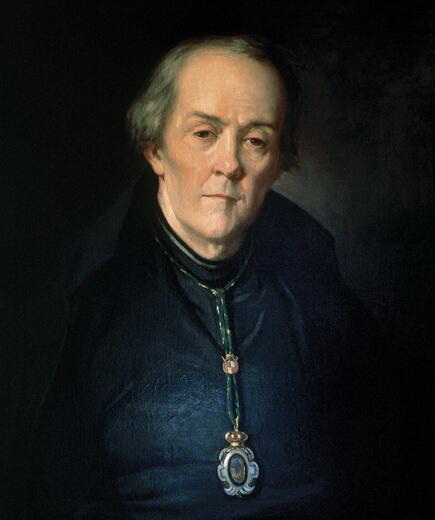
Alberto Lista (portrait by Domingo Valdivieso)

Alberto Rodríguez de Lista y Aragón (October 15, 1775 – October 5, 1848) was a Spanish poet and educationalist.

== Biography ==
He was born in Seville. He began teaching at the age of fifteen, and when little over twenty was made professor of elocution and poetry at the University of Seville.

After the French occupation of Seville in 1810, Alberto Lista maintained a close relationship with the Afrancesado (pro-French) Juan Meléndez Valdés and was appointed to oversee an official French-backed newspaper called "Gaceta de Sevilla", which was published between 13 February 1810, and 24 August 1812. In 1813 he was exiled, on political grounds, but pardoned in 1817.

He then returned to Spain and, after teaching for three years at Bilbao, started a critical review at Madrid. Shortly afterwards he founded the celebrated college of San Mateo in that city. The liberal character of the San Mateo educational system was not favored by the government, and in 1823 the college was closed.

Lista after some time spent in Bayonne, Paris and London was recalled to Spain in 1833 to edit the official Madrid Gazette. He was one of the founders of the Ateneo, the free university of Madrid, and up till 1840 was director of a college at Cádiz. All the leading spirits of the young generation of Spaniards, statesmen, writers, soldiers and diplomatists came under his influence. He died in Seville on October 5, 1848.
