= Comarca de Alfaro =

Alfaro
- Comarca
- Interactive map of Alfaro
- Coordinates: 42.2131°N 1.82°W
- Country: Spain

Alfaro is a comarca in La Rioja province in Spain.
