= Leandro Fernández de Moratín =

Spanish dramatist, translator and neoclassical poet (1760–1828)

Leandro Fernández de Moratín ORE
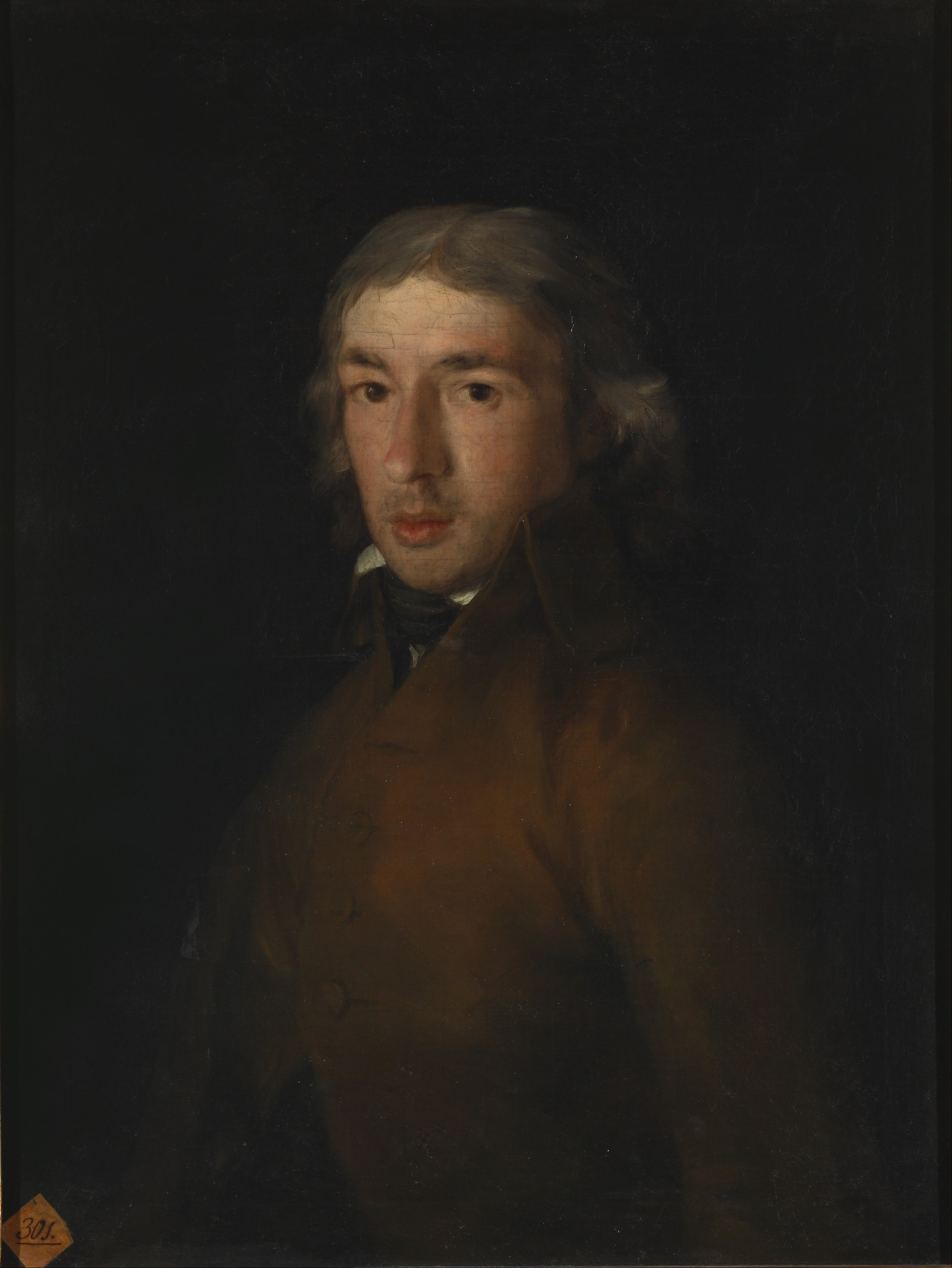
- Moratín painted by Goya
- Born: 10 March 1760; Madrid
- Died: 21 June 1828 (aged 68); Paris
- Resting place: Pantheon of Illustrious Men
- Occupations: Dramatist; translator; poet

Leandro Fernández de Moratín ORE (Spanish pronunciation: [leˈandɾo feɾˈnandeθ ðe moɾaˈtin]; 10 March 1760 – 21 June 1828) was a Spanish dramatist, translator and neoclassical poet. He was a major poet, dramatist and man of letters whose writings promoted the reformist ideas associated with the Spanish Enlightenment.

== Biography ==
Moratín was born in Madrid the son of Nicolás Fernández de Moratín, a major literary reformer in Spain from 1762 until his death in 1828.

Distrusting the teaching offered in Spain's universities at the time, Leandro grew up in the rich literary environment of his father and became an admirer of Enlightenment thought. Though his poetical tastes were early developed, his father apprenticed him to a jeweller. At the age of eighteen Moratín won the second prize of the Academy for a heroic poem on the conquest of Granada, and two years afterwards he attracted more general attention with his Lección poética, a satire upon the popular poets of the day. Early in his career, he was supported by statesman and author Gaspar Melchor de Jovellanos, who, in 1787, arranged for him to study for a year in Paris. In 1792, the Spanish government provided the funds for him to travel to England in order to extend his education.

On his return to Spain, Moratín was tonsured and presented to a sinecure benefice in the diocese of Burgos. In 1790 he published his first comedy El viejo y la niña (The Old Man and the Young Girl), a sombre work which attacked the consequences of arranged marriages between people of differing ages. Two years later, in 1792, he wrote the play La comedia nueva (The New Comedy), a dramatic attack on the extravagant plots used by other contemporary playwrights.

On the fall of Floridablanca, Moratín found another patron in Manuel Godoy, who provided him with a pension and the means for foreign travel; he accordingly visited England, where he began a prose translation of Hamlet, printed in 1798 but never performed. From England he passed to the Low Countries, Germany, Switzerland and Italy, and on his return to Spain 1796 was appointed official translator to the foreign office. In 1804 he produced La Mogigata, written between 1797 and 1803. This piece was favourably received, and an attempt to suppress it on religious grounds failed.

A supporter of Joseph Bonaparte, whose rule had allowed far more expression of liberal thinking than Spain's Bourbon monarch Carlos IV was willing to tolerate, Moratín was given the post of royal librarian. However, his 1805 comedy El sí de las niñas (The Maidens' Consent) was denounced upon the reinstatement of the Inquisition when Ferdinand VII regained the throne after the fall of the Bonapartes, and he had to abandon playwriting and was forced into exile in France. In 1812 his Escuela de los maridos, a translation of Molière's École des maris, was produced at Madrid, and in 1813 El Médico á Palos (a translation of Le Médecin malgré lui) at Barcelona. From 1814 to 1828 Moratín lived in Italy and France, compiling a work on the early Spanish drama (Orígenes del teatro español).

Moratín died in Paris and was buried there in the Père Lachaise Cemetery. However, at the turn of the 20th century, his remains were brought back to Spain for interment in Madrid's Panteón de Hombres Ilustres (Pantheon of Illustrious Men).
