= Spanish literature =

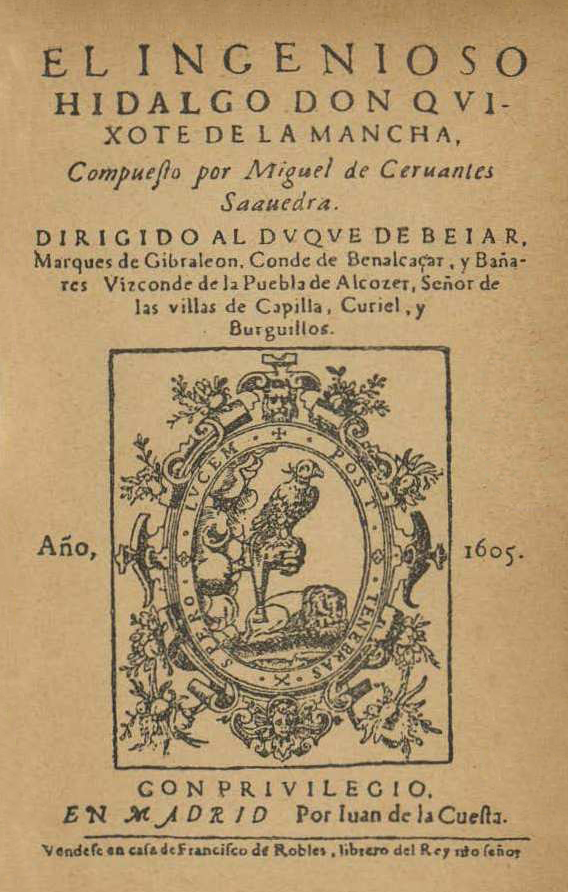
Cervantes's Don Quixote is considered the most emblematic work in the canon of Spanish literature and a founding classic of Western literature.

Spanish literature is literature (Spanish poetry, prose, and drama) written in the Spanish language within the territory that presently constitutes the Kingdom of Spain. Its development coincides and frequently intersects with that of other literary traditions from regions within the same territory, particularly Catalan literature, Galician intersects as well with Latin, Jewish, and Arabic literary traditions of the Iberian Peninsula. The literature of Spanish America is an important branch of Spanish literature, with its own particular characteristics dating back to the earliest years of Spain’s conquest of the Americas (see Latin American literature).

== Overview ==
The Roman conquest and occupation of the Iberian Peninsula beginning in the 3rd century BC brought a Latin culture to Spanish territories. The Muslim conquest in 711 CE brought the cultures of West Asia and the North Africa to the peninsula, creating Andalusi literary traditions. In medieval Spanish literature, the earliest recorded examples of a vernacular Romance-based literature mix Muslim, Jewish, and Christian culture. One of the notable works is the epic poem Cantar de Mio Cid, composed some time between 1140 and 1207. Spanish prose gained popularity in the mid-thirteenth century. Lyric poetry in the Middle Ages includes popular poems and the courtly poetry of the nobles. During the 15th century the pre-Renaissance occurred and literary production increased greatly. In the Renaissance important topics were poetry, religious literature, and prose.

In the 16th century the first Spanish novels appeared, Lazarillo de Tormes and Guzmán de Alfarache. In the Baroque era of the 17th century important works were the prose of Francisco de Quevedo and Baltasar Gracián. A notable author was Miguel de Cervantes Saavedra, famous for his masterpiece Don Quixote de la Mancha. In this novel Cervantes consolidated the form of literature that the picaresque novel had established in Spain to a fictional narrative that became the template for many novelists throughout the history of Spanish literature.

In the Enlightenment era of the 18th century, notable works include the prose of Feijoo, Jovellanos, and Cadalso; the lyric of Juan Meléndez Valdés, Tomás de Iriarte and Félix María Samaniego), and the theater, with Leandro Fernández de Moratín, Ramón de la Cruz, and Vicente García de la Huerta. In Romanticism (beginning of the 19th century) important topics are: the poetry of José de Espronceda and other poets; prose; the theater, with Ángel de Saavedra (Duke of Rivas), José Zorrilla, and other authors. In Realism (end of the 19th century), which is mixed with Naturalism, important topics are the novel, with Juan Valera, José María de Pereda, Benito Pérez Galdós, Emilia Pardo Bazán, Leopoldo Alas (Clarín), Armando Palacio Valdés, and Vicente Blasco Ibáñez; poetry, with Ramón de Campoamor, Gaspar Núñez de Arce, and other poets; the theater, with José Echegaray, Manuel Tamayo y Baus, and other dramatists; and the literary critics, emphasizing Menéndez Pelayo.

In Modernism several currents appear: Parnasianism, Symbolism, Futurism, and Creationism. The destruction of Spain's fleet in Cuba by the U.S. in 1898 provoked a crisis in Spain. A group of younger writers, among them Miguel de Unamuno, Pío Baroja, and José Martínez Ruiz (Azorín), made changes to literature's form and content. By the year 1914—the year of the outbreak of the First World War and of the publication of the first major work of the generation's leading voice, José Ortega y Gasset—a number of slightly younger writers had established their own place within the Spanish cultural field. Leading voices include the poet Juan Ramón Jiménez, the academics and essayists Ramón Menéndez Pidal, Gregorio Marañón, Manuel Azaña, Eugenio d'Ors, and Ortega y Gasset, and the novelists Gabriel Miró, Ramón Pérez de Ayala, and Ramón Gómez de la Serna. Around 1920 a younger group of writers—mostly poets—began publishing works that from their beginnings revealed the extent to which younger artists were absorbing the literary experimentation of the writers of 1898 and 1914. Poets were closely tied to formal academia. Novelists such as Benjamín Jarnés, Rosa Chacel, Francisco Ayala, and Ramón J. Sender were equally experimental and academic.

The Spanish Civil War had a devastating impact on Spanish writing. Among the handful of civil war poets and writers, Miguel Hernández stands out. During the early dictatorship (1939–1955), literature followed dictator Francisco Franco's reactionary vision of a second, Catholic Spanish golden age. By the mid-1950s, just as with the novel, a new generation which had only experienced the Spanish Civil War in childhood was coming of age. By the early 1960s, Spanish authors moved towards a restless literary experimentation. When Franco died in 1975, the important work of establishing democracy had an immediate impact on Spanish letters. Over the next several years a wealth of young new writers, among them Juan José Millás, Rosa Montero, Javier Marías, Luis Mateo Díez, José María Merino, Félix de Azúa, Cristina Fernández Cubas, Enrique Vila-Matas, Carme Riera, and later Antonio Muñoz Molina and Almudena Grandes, would begin carving out a prominent place for themselves within the Spanish cultural field.

== Pre-medieval literature ==
The Roman conquest and occupation of the peninsula, spanning from the 3rd century BCE to the 5h century CE, brought a fully developed Latin culture to Spanish territories. While the invasion of Germanic tribes in the fifth century CE put an end to Roman Spain, the tribes’ relative lack of advanced culture, including any kind of literary tradition, meant that any written literature produced in the Iberian Peninsula continued along Romanized lines. Outstanding amongst the works produced is Saint Isidore of Seville’s (c. 560–636) Etymologiae, an attempted summa of all classical knowledge. Called “the last scholar of the ancient world", St. Isidore penned theological and proto-scientific treatises, letters, and a series of histories that would serve as models for the rest of Western Europe throughout the Middle Ages.

The arrival of Muslim invaders in 711 CE brought the cultures of the Middle and Far East to the Iberian Peninsula and ultimately to all of Europe. During the era of relative religious tolerance that followed, writers such as the Jewish theologian Maimonides (1138–1204) or the Muslim polymath (1126–1198) Averroes penned works of theology, science, philosophy, and mathematics that would have lasting impacts on Hebrew and Muslim philosophy and prove essential to the flowering of the European Renaissance centuries later. While none of their works can be considered direct ancestors of a Spanish literary tradition, it was out of the cultural milieu fostered by such intellectual energy that the first written manifestations of a Spanish literature proper arise.

== Medieval Spanish literature ==
=== Andalusi literature ===
The period of Islamic rule in Iberia from 711 to 1492 brought many new literary traditions to Spain. Most literature at this time was produced in standard Arabic, though poetry and other forms of literature of the Jewish golden age found expression in Judeo-Arabic or Hebrew. Maimonides, for example, wrote his magnum opus The Guide for the Perplexed in Arabic with Hebrew script.

Other major literary figures of the time include Ibn Arabi, Al-Mu'tamid ibn Abbad, Ibn al-Khatib, Ibn Zaydún and Hafsa Bint al-Hajj al-Rukuniyya.

Important literary styles include the muwashah, maqama, and nawba.

Important works include Al-ʿIqd al-Farīd, Hayy ibn Yaqdhan, The Incoherence of the Incoherence, and Hadith Bayad wa Riyad.

=== The kharjas ===
The earliest recorded examples of a vernacular Romance-based literature date from the same time and location, the rich mix of Muslim, Jewish, and Christian cultures in Muslim Spain, in which Maimonides, Averroes, and others worked. The Jarchas, dating from the 9th to the 12th centuries C.E., were short poems spoken in local colloquial Hispano-Romance dialects, known as Mozarabic, but written in Arabic script. The Jarchas appeared at the end of longer poetry written in Arabic or Hebrew known as muwashshah, which were lengthy glosses on the ideas expressed in the jarchas. Typically spoken in the voice of a woman, the jarchas express the anxieties of love, particularly of its loss.

This combination of Hispano-Romance expression with Arabic script, only discovered in 1948, locates the rise of a Spanish literary tradition in the cultural heterogeneity that characterized Medieval Spanish society and politics. However, the Mozarabic language of the Jarchas appears to be a separate Romance language whose evolution from Vulgar Latin paralleled that of Castilian Spanish rather than deriving from or fusing into the latter. Hence, while the relatively recent discovery of the Jarchas challenges the pride of chronological place that belonged for so long to the Poema del Cid (El Cantar de mío Cid) (1140 CE) in the history of Spanish literature, they cannot be seen as a precursor to Spain's great epic poem. What the discovery of the jarchas makes clear instead is that from its origins, the literature of Spain has arisen out of and borne witness to a rich, heterogeneous mix of cultures and languages.

=== Cantar de Mio Cid ===
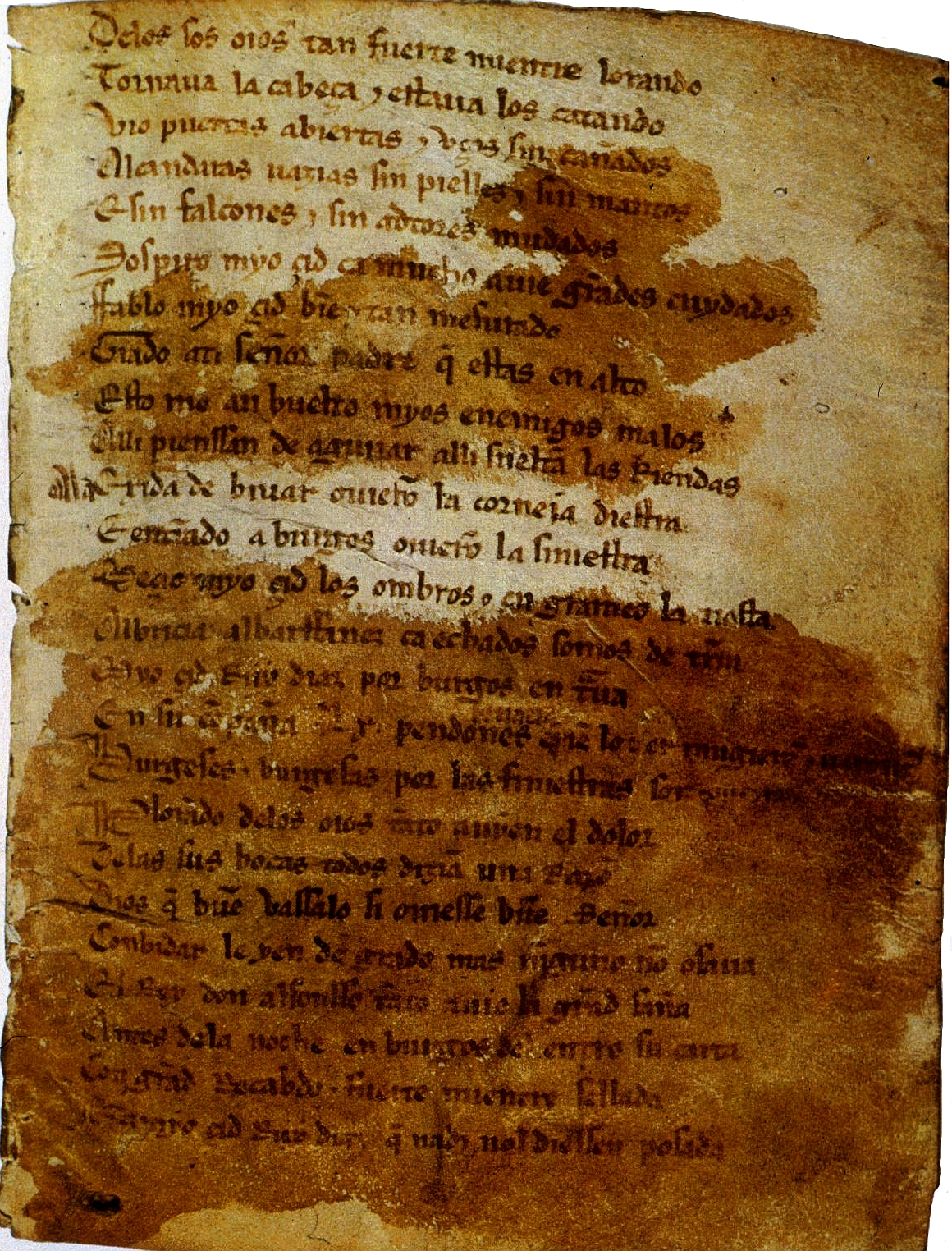
The Cantar de Mio Cid is the oldest preserved Spanish cantar de gesta

The epic poem Cantar de Mio Cid was written about a real man—his battles, conquests, and daily life. The poet, name unknown, wrote the epic in about 1140 and Cid supposedly died forty years before in 1099. This epic represents realism, because nothing was exaggerated and the details are very real, even the geography correctly portrays the areas in which Cid traveled and lived. Unlike other European epics, the poem is not idealized and there is no presence of supernatural beings. It has assonance instead of rhyme and its lines vary in length, the most common length being fourteen syllables. This type of verse is known as mester de juglaria (verse form of the minstrels). The epic is divided into three parts, also known as cantos.

=== Mester de Juglaría ===
Medieval Spanish poets recognized the Mester de Juglaría as a literary form written by the minstrels (juglares) and composed of varying line length and use of assonance instead of rhyme. These poems were sung to uneducated audiences, nobles and peasants alike.

=== Mester de Clerecía ===
This Castilian narrative poetry known as the Mester de Clerecía became popular in the thirteenth century. It is the verse form of the learned poets, usually clerics (hence the name 'clerecía'). The poetry was formal, with carefully counted syllables in each line. Popular themes were Christian legends, lives of saints and tales from classical antiquity. The poems were recited to villagers in public plazas. Two traits separate this form from the mester de juglaría: didacticism and erudition. Gonzalo de Berceo was one of the greatest advocates of this school, writing on religious subjects.

=== Spanish prose ===
Spanish prose gained popularity in the mid-thirteenth century when King Alfonso X of Castile gave support and recognition to the writing form. He, with the help of his groups of intellectuals, directed the composition of many prose works including Las siete partidas, the first modern book of laws of the land written in the people's language. Another work was La primera crónica general which accounted for the history of Spain from the creation until the end of Alfonso's father's reign, San Fernando. For his direction of these works and many others he directed, Alfonso X is called the father of Spanish prose. His nephew, Don Juan Manuel is famous for his prose work El Conde Lucanor which is a frame story or short stories within an overall story. In this work, the Conde Lucanor seeks advice from his wise counselor, Patronio, who gives the advice through the telling of stories. Juan Manuel also wrote lesser-known works such as El libro de los estados on the social classes and El libro del caballero y escudero on philosophical discussions. Toward the end of the Middle Ages, writer Fernando del Pulgar (1436-1490?) created a new type of prose named the verbal portrait. This form is demonstrated by Pulgar's work Claros varones de Castilla in which he represents the detailed lives of twenty-four distinguished contemporaries. He explores their moral and psychological natures as well as physical traits. Pulgar was the official historian of the monarchs Fernando and Isabel, the famous Catholic Monarchs of Spain. This position gave him close encounters with the characters in this book, making the work realistic and detailed.

=== Lyric poetry of the Middle Ages ===
Lyric poetry in the Middle Ages can be divided into three groups: the jarchas, the popular poems originating from folk-songs sung by commoners, and the courtly poetry of the nobles. Alfonso X of Castile fits into the third group with his series of three hundred poems, written in Galician: Las cantigas de Santa María. Another poet, Juan Ruiz, or the Arcipreste de Hita is an outstanding lyricist of the fourteenth century. His only work, Libro de buen amor is a framework tale in which he includes translations from Ovid, satires, little poems called serranillas, twenty-nine fables, a sermon on Christian armor, and many lyric poems that praise the Virgin Mary. Poet Íñigo López de Mendoza, the Marqués de Santillana (1398–1458), begins to show the movement away from the traditions of the Middle Ages. He shows a knowledge of Latin authors and familiarity with the works of Dante and Petrarch. Mendoza was also the first to introduce the sonnet into Spanish literature. The last great poet of the Middle Ages is Jorge Manrique. He is famous for his work which laments the death of his father, Coplas a la muerte de su padre. In this piece, Manrique shows classical feelings by expressing himself in a universal manner (all things come to an end). He is still considered a poet of the Middle Ages in that he finds peace and finality in religion.

== Renaissance ==
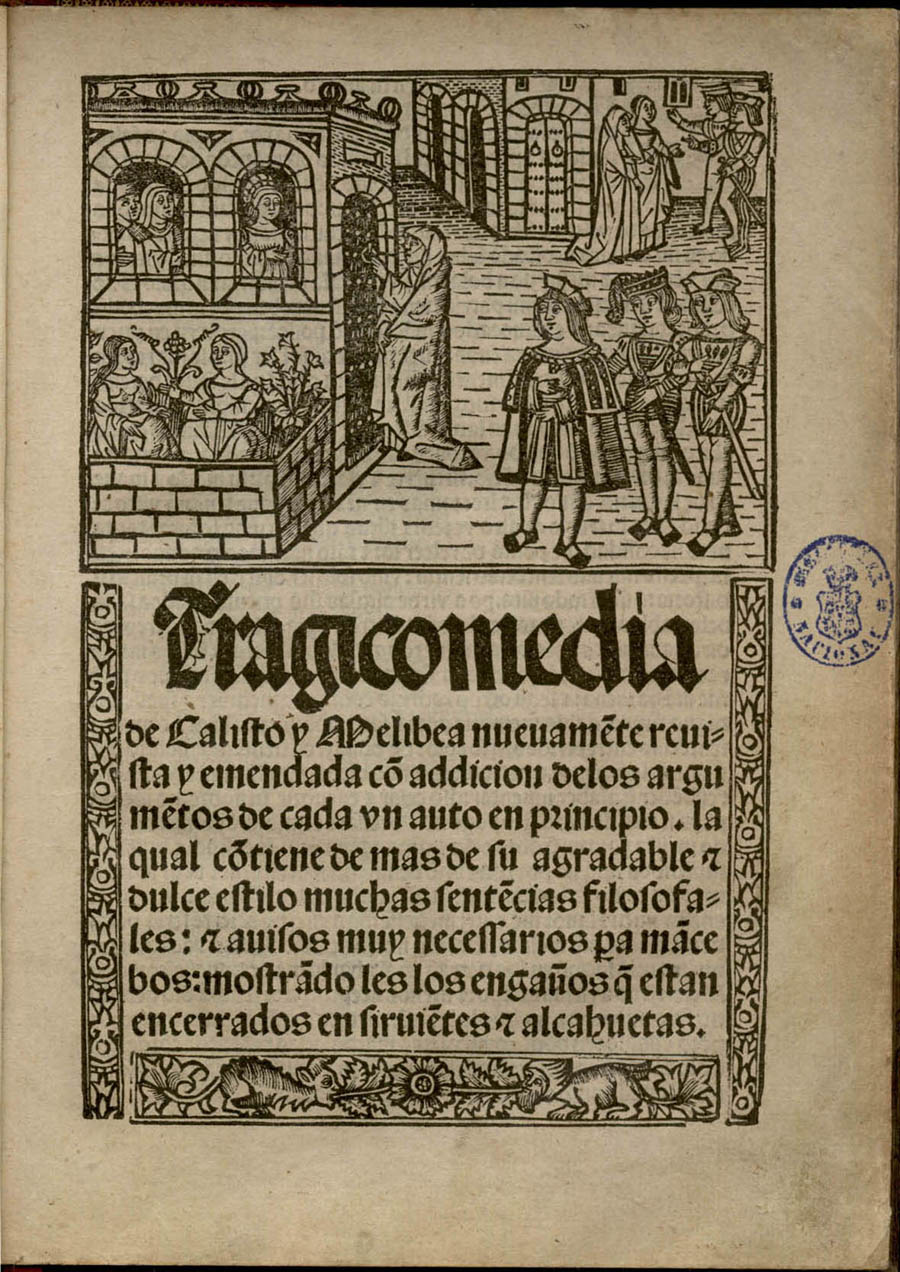
La Celestina by Fernando de Rojas

The 15th century may be thought of as a pre-Renaissance period. Literary production increases greatly. Outstanding poets of this century include Juan de Mena and Íñigo López de Mendoza (Marquess of Santillana). Spanish literature of the Middle Ages concludes with La Celestina by Fernando de Rojas.

Important Renaissance themes are poetry, with Garcilaso de la Vega and Juan Boscán; religious literature, with Fray Luis de León, San Juan de la Cruz, and Santa Teresa de Jesús; and prose, with the anonymous El Lazarillo de Tormes. Among the principal features of the Renaissance were the revival of learning based on classical sources, the rise of courtly patronage, the development of perspective in painting, and advances in science. The most important characteristics of the Renaissance are:

- The prevalence of natural, uncomplicated language, avoiding affectation, amaneramiento and the over-refined phrase, producing simple vocabulary and straightforward syntax.
- Themes such as love - conceived from the platonic point of view; nature - as somewhat idyllic (bucolic); pagan mythology - concerned with female beauty and the histories of the gods, following always the same classical ideal. In relation to these themes, various Renaissance points exist (???) some of them taken from the classical world:
  - Carpe Diem, ("seize the day" or "take advantage of the moment"), which recommends the enjoyment of life before the arrival of old age.
  - Collige, virgo, rosas which literary means "Pick virgin the roses" and is a metaphor similar to Carpe Diem but applied to female beauty, described always following the same plan: a young blonde, with serene, clear eyes, white skin, red lips, rosy cheeks, etc.
  - The Beatus Ille or praise of rural life, away from material things, as opposed to life in the city, with its dangers and intrigues.
  - The Locus Amoenus or description of nature in all its idyllic perfection.
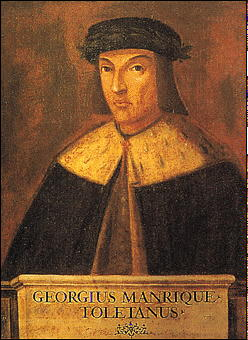
Jorge Manrique

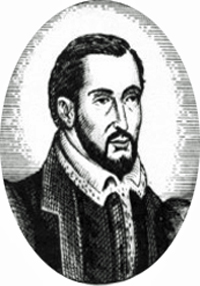
Fernando de Rojas

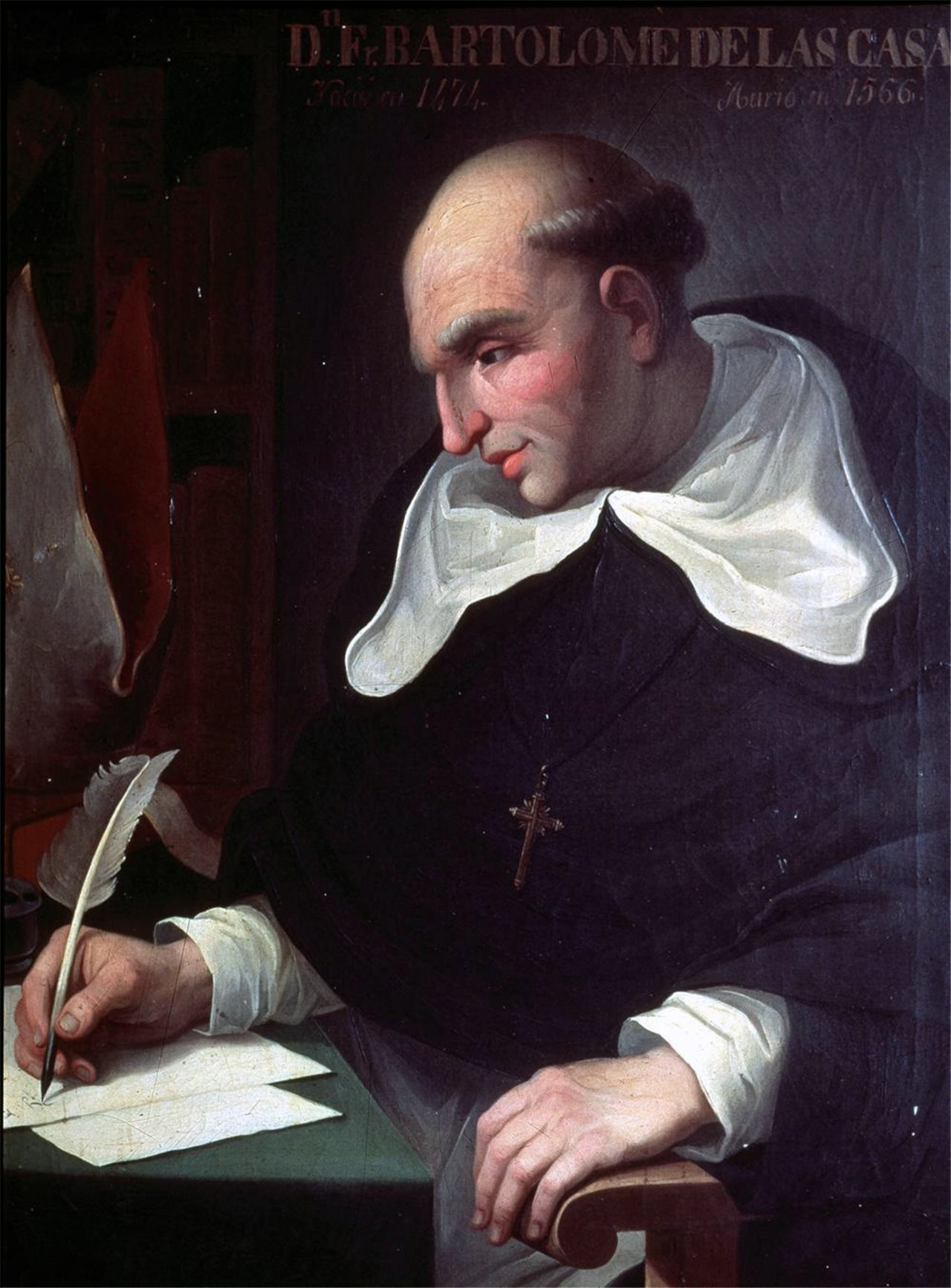
Bartolomé de las Casas

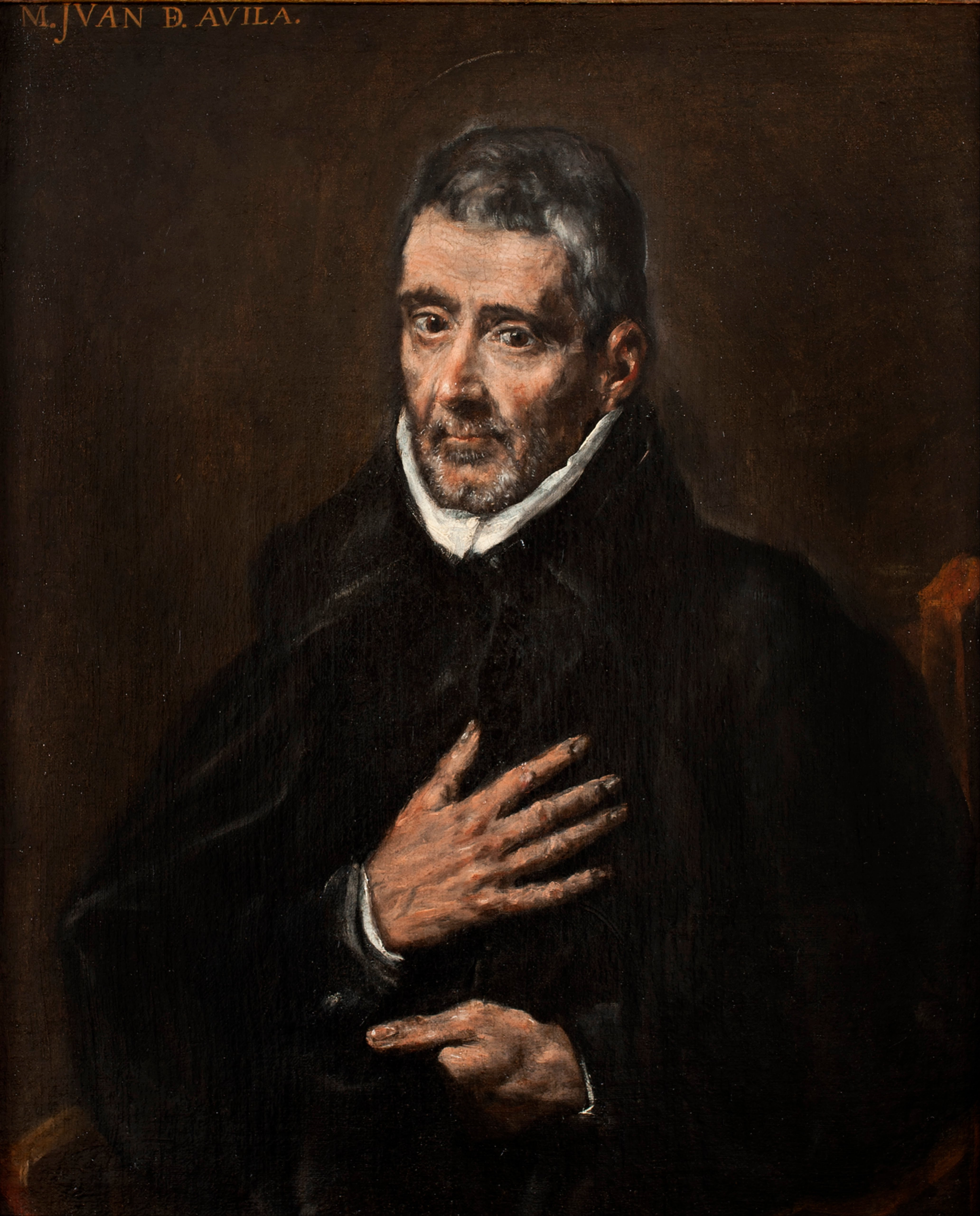
John of Ávila

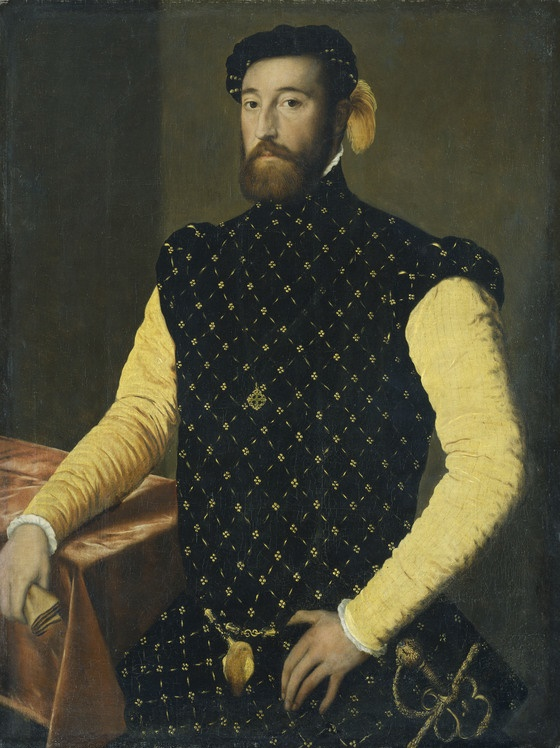
Garcilaso de la Vega

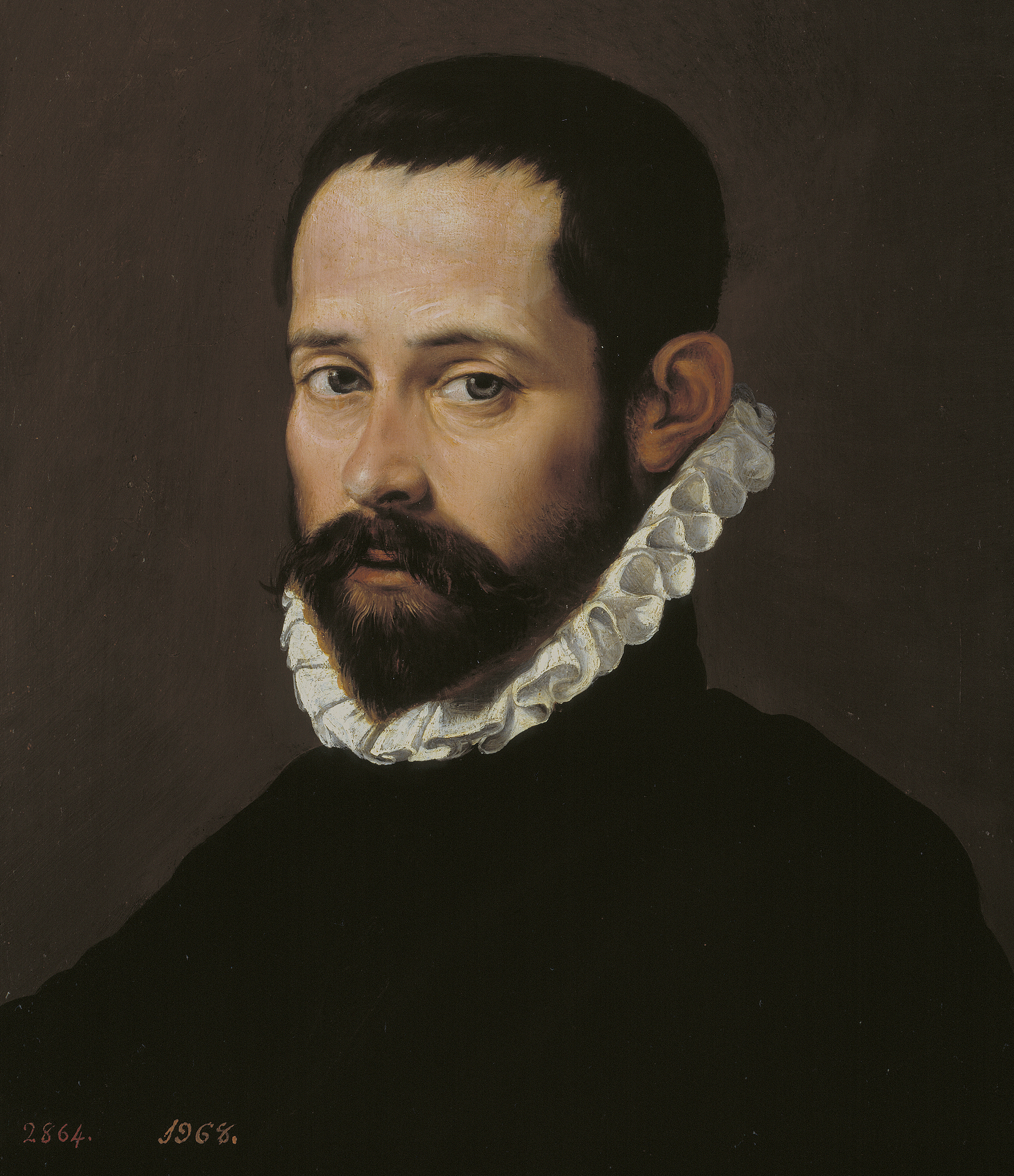
Diego Hurtado de Mendoza

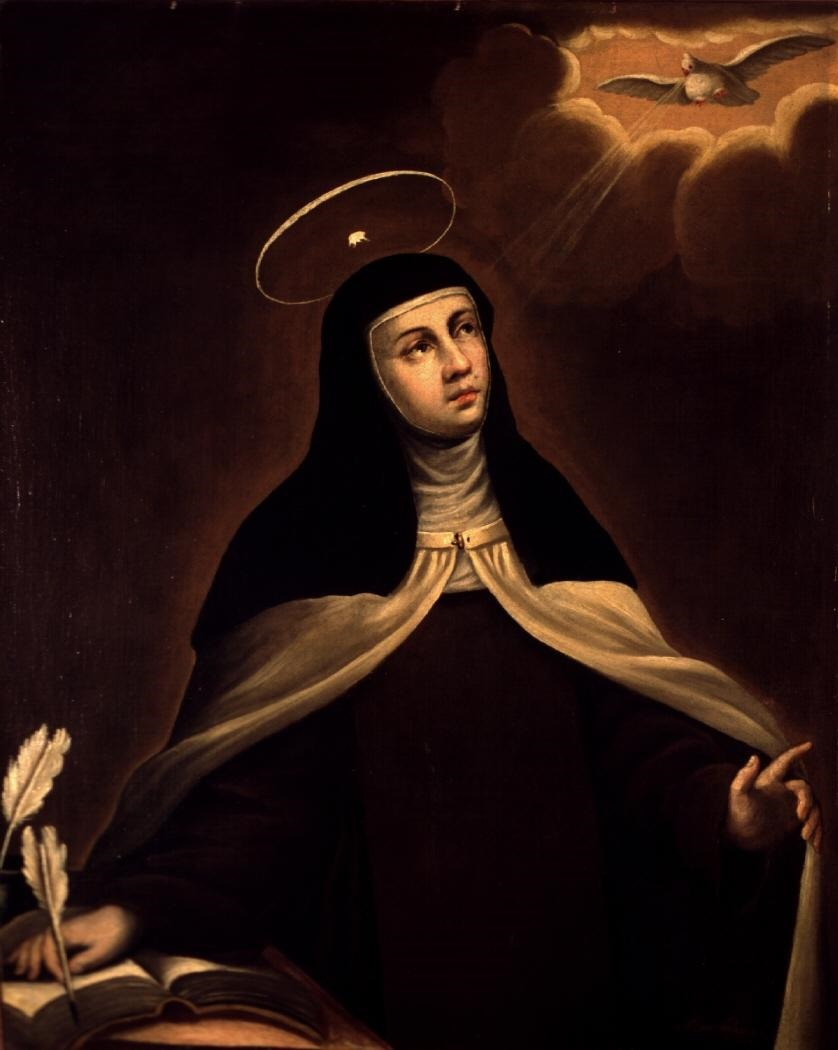
Teresa of Ávila

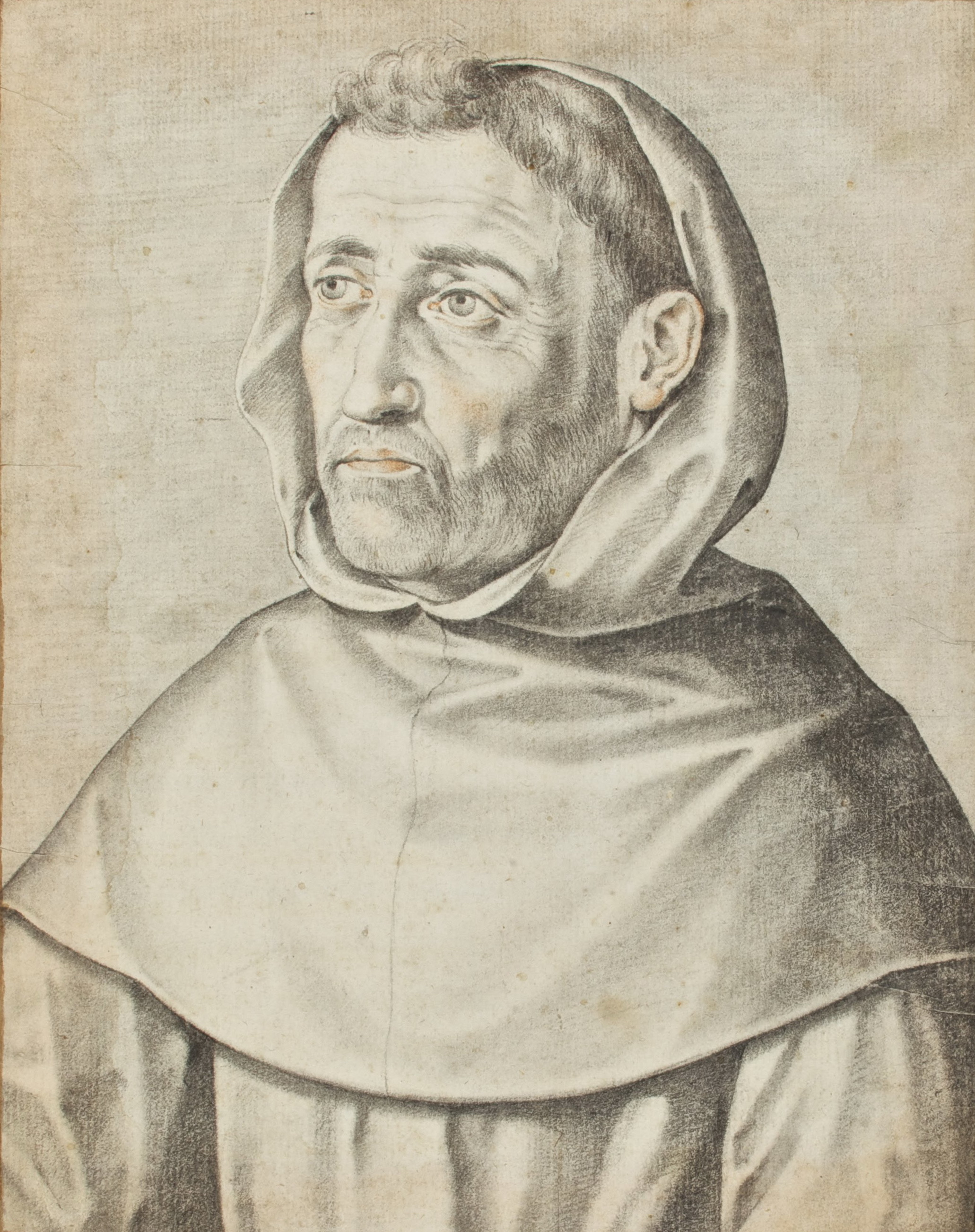
Luis de León

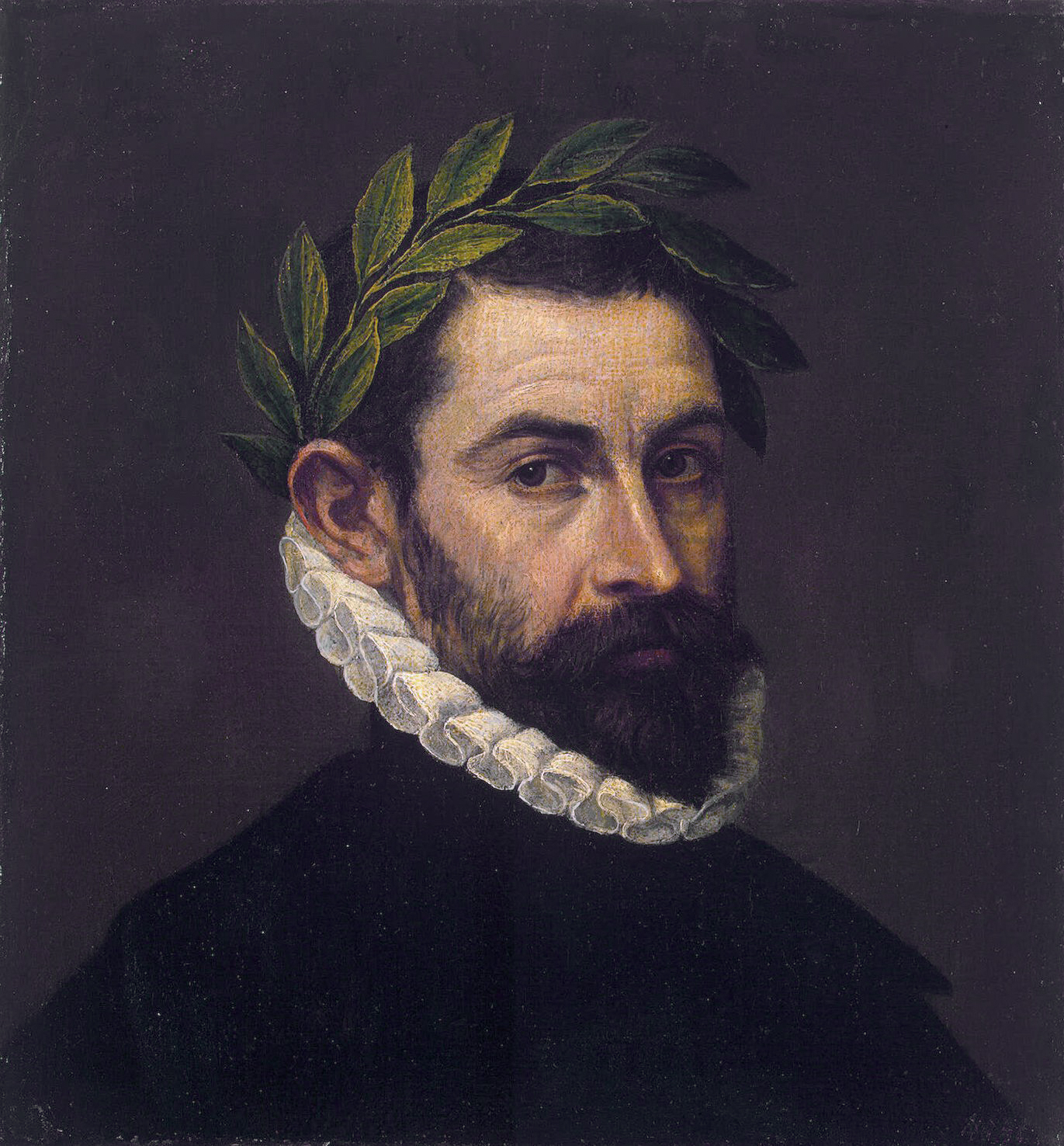
Alonso de Ercilla

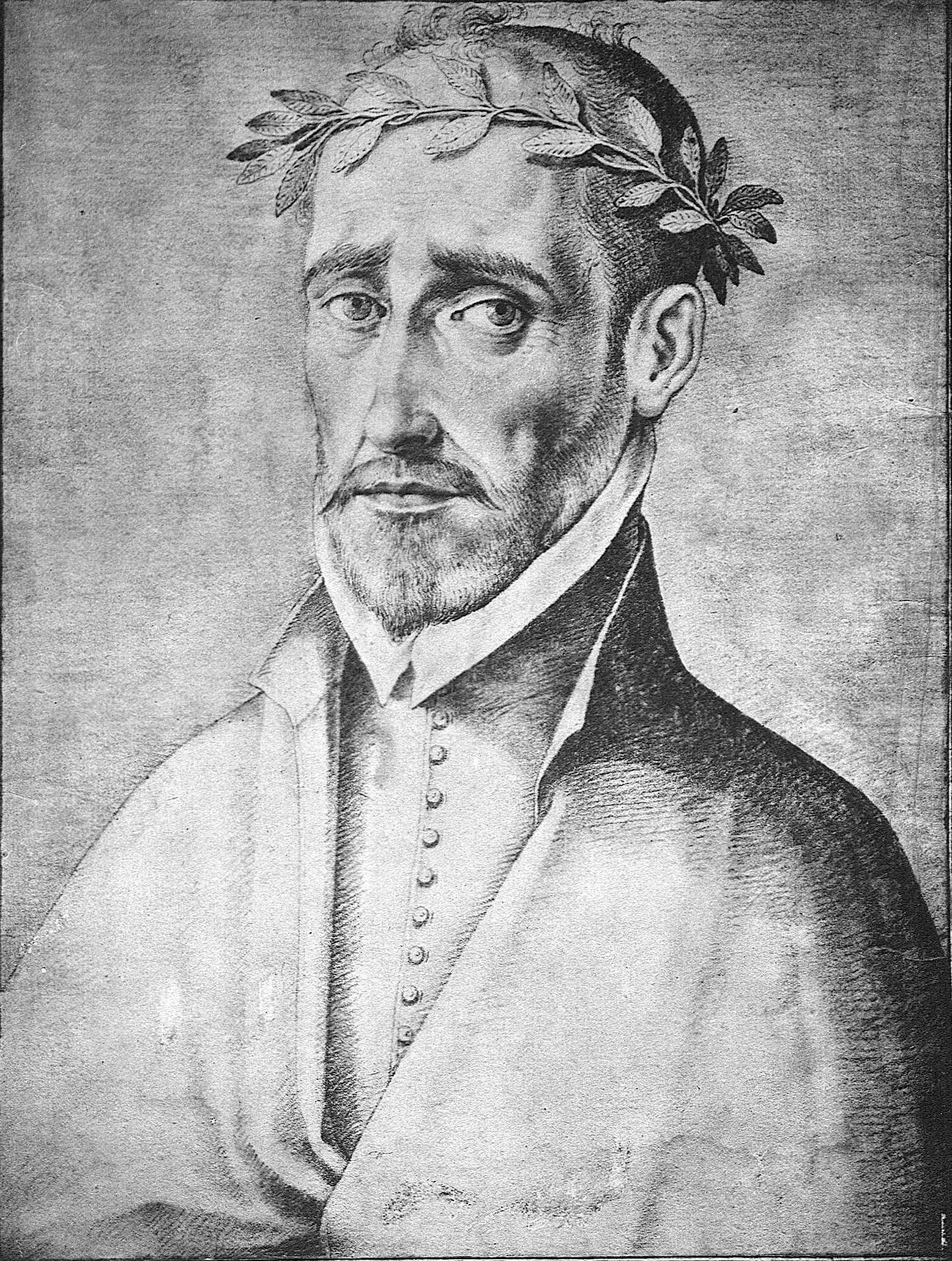
Fernando de Herrera

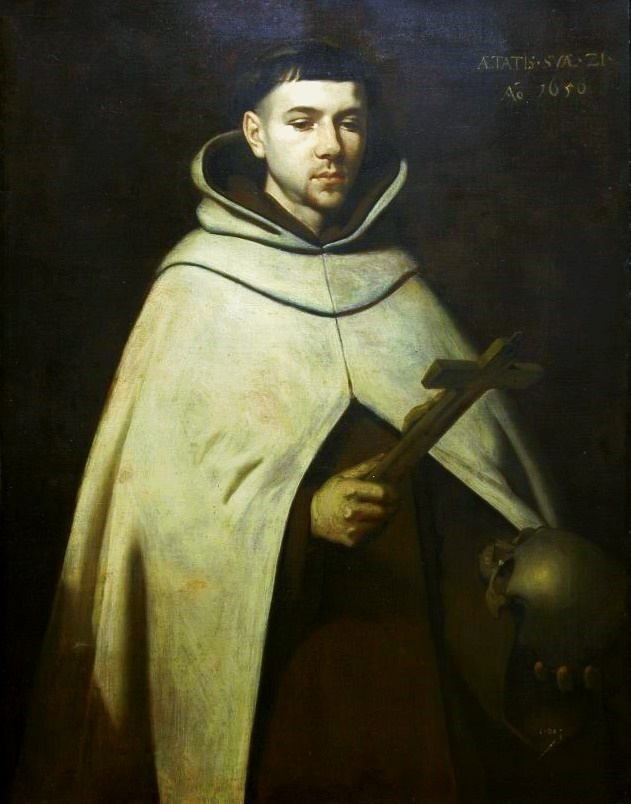
John of the Cross

== Baroque ==
In the Baroque of the 17th century important topics are the prose of Francisco de Quevedo and Baltasar Gracián; the theater is notable (Lope de Vega, Pedro Calderón de la Barca, and Tirso de Molina); and poetry with Luis de Góngora (who is a Culteranist) and Francisco de Quevedo (who is a Conceptist). In the works of Miguel de Cervantes Saavedra notable novels are La Galatea and Don Quixote de la Mancha. The Baroque style used exaggerated motion and clear, easily interpreted detail to produce drama, tension, exuberance, and grandeur in sculpture, painting, literature, dance, and music.

The Baroque is characterized by the following points:

- Pessimism: The Renaissance had not achieved its purpose of imposing harmony and perfection in the world, as the humanists intended, nor had it made man happier; wars and social inequality continued to be present; pain and calamities were commonplace throughout Europe. An intellectual pessimism took hold, which increased as time passed. This was shown by the angry character of the comedies of that epoch, and by rascal characters on which the picaresque novels are based.
- Disillusionment: As the Renaissance ideals failed, and, in the case of Spain, political power was being dispelled, disillusionment continued to arise in literature. Many cases recall those of two centuries before, with the Danza de la Muerte or Manrique's Coplas a la muerte de su padre. Quevedo said that life is formed by "successions of deceased". Newborns turn into the deceased, and diapers into the shroud that covers lifeless bodies. This leads to the conclusion that nothing is important except obtaining eternal salvation.
- Worry about the passing of time.
- Loss of confidence in the Renaissance ideals.
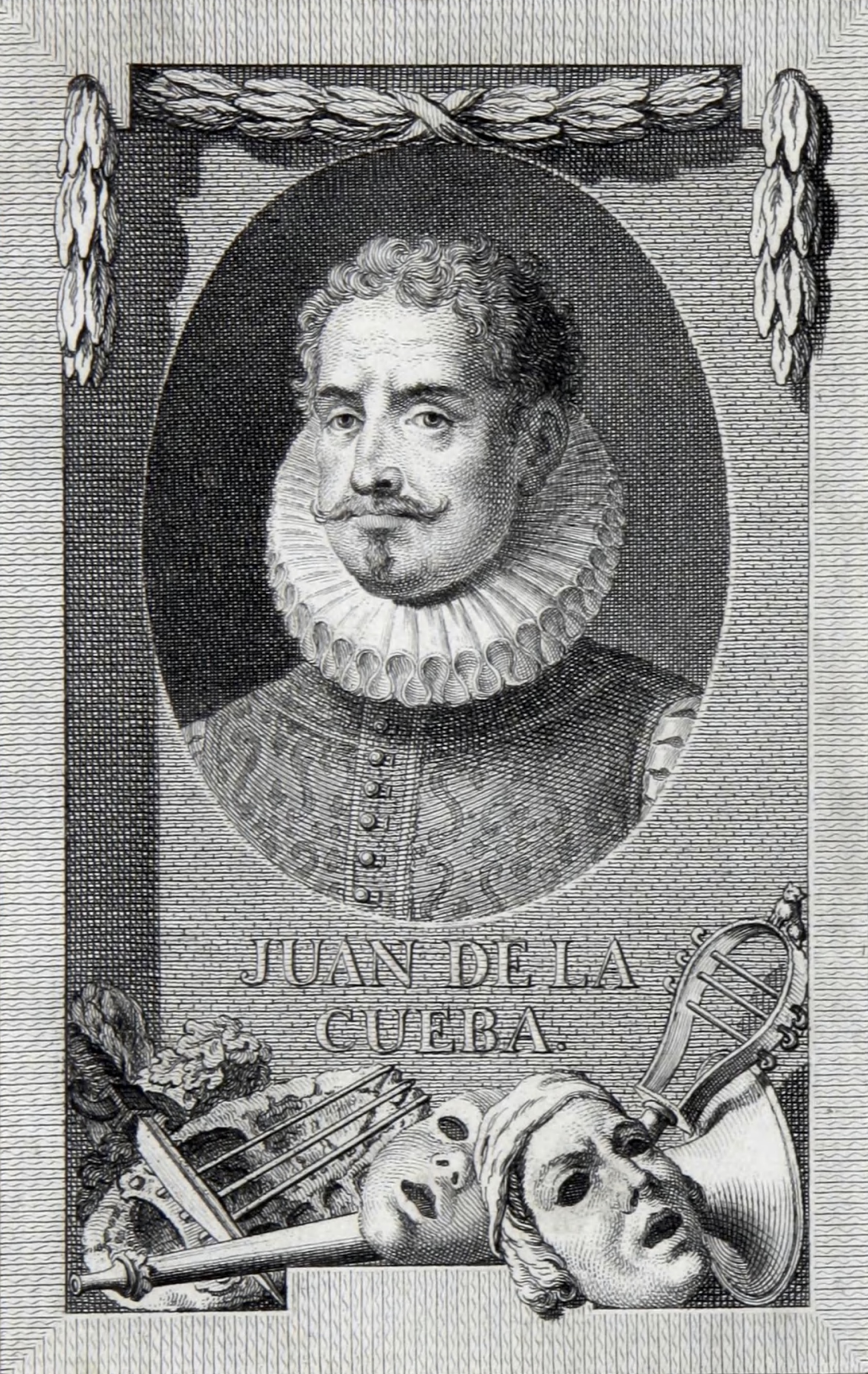
Juan de la Cueva

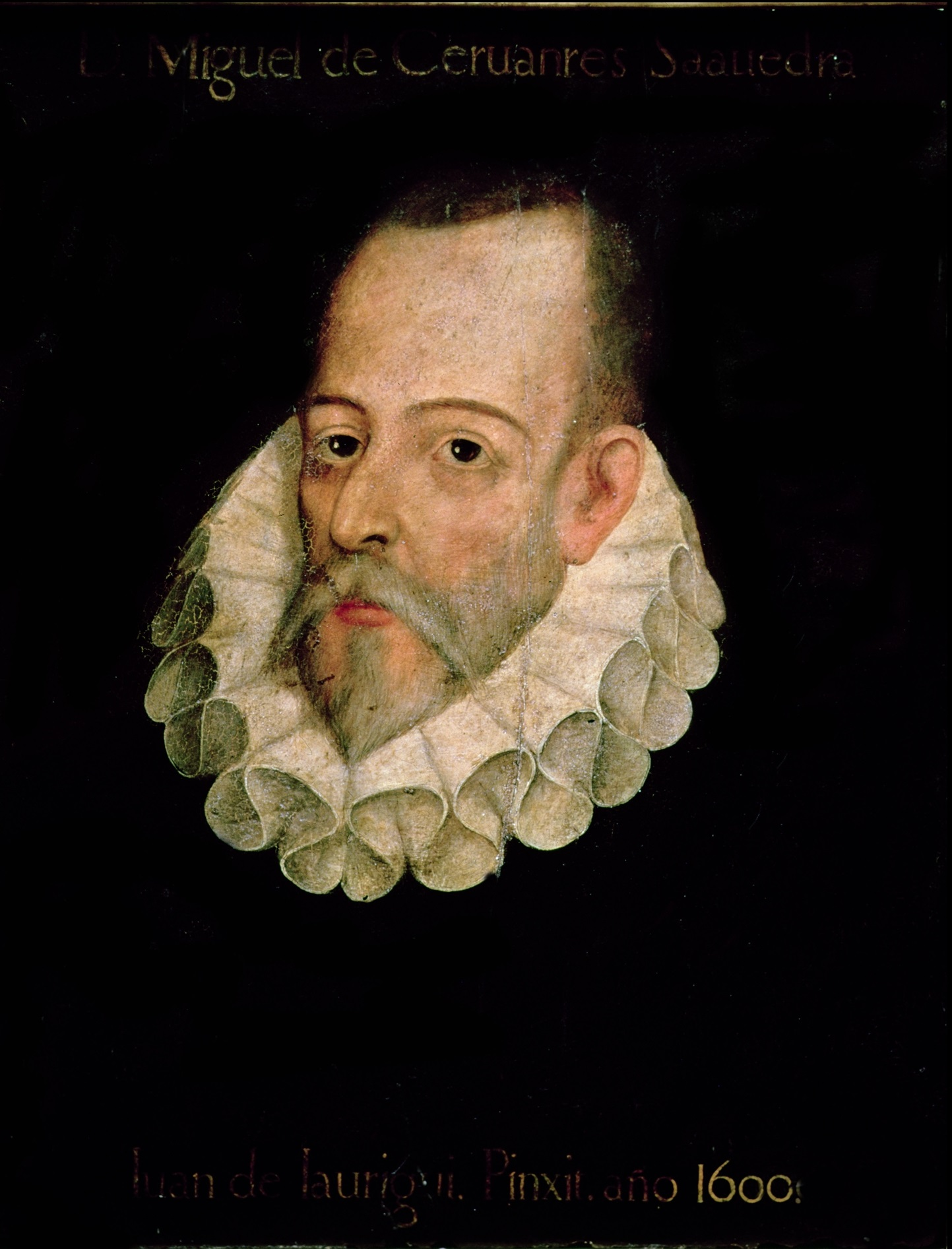
Miguel de Cervantes

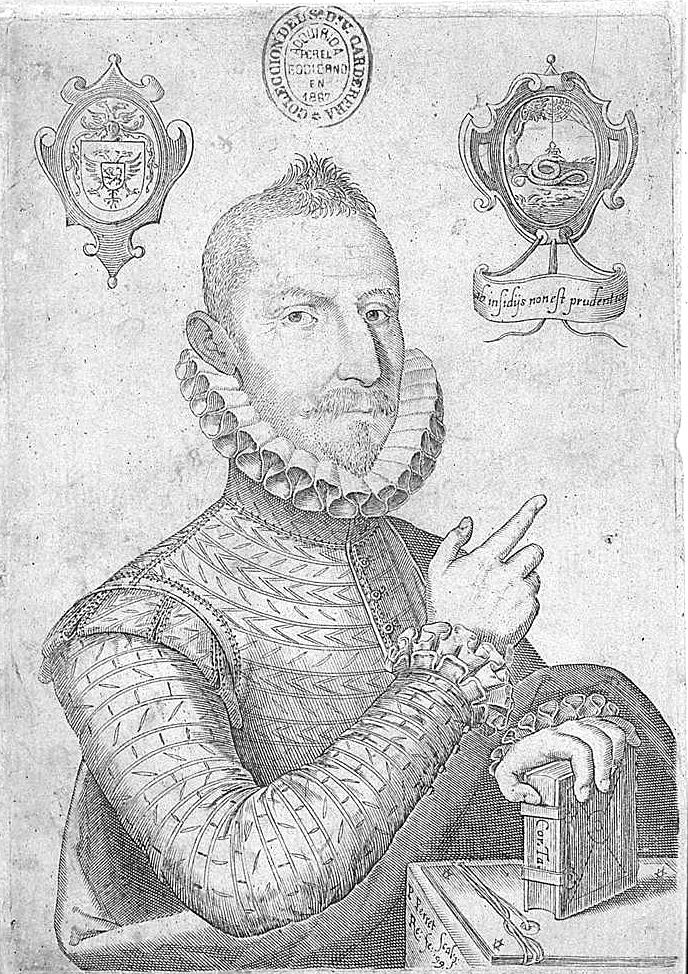
Mateo Alemán

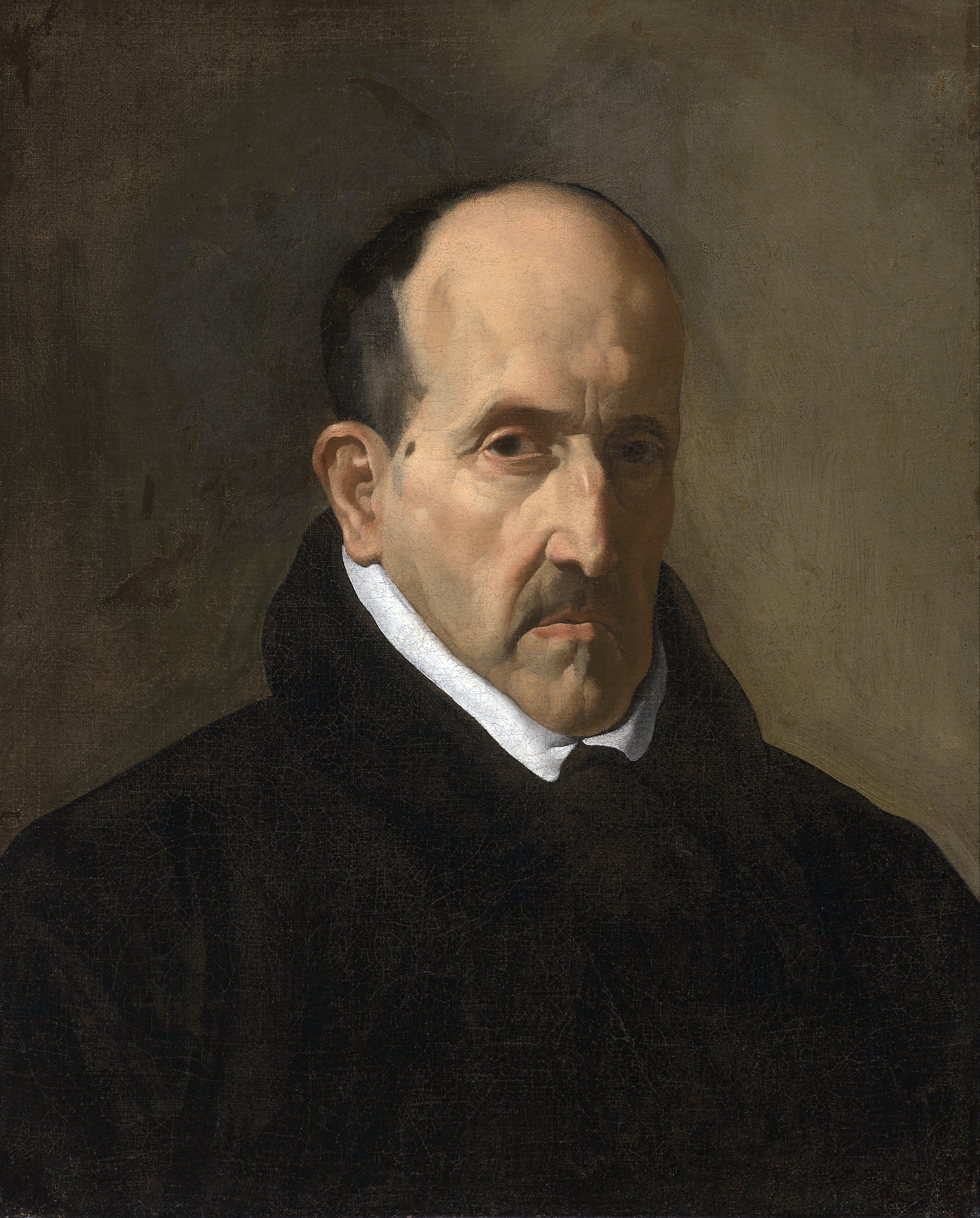
Luis de Góngora

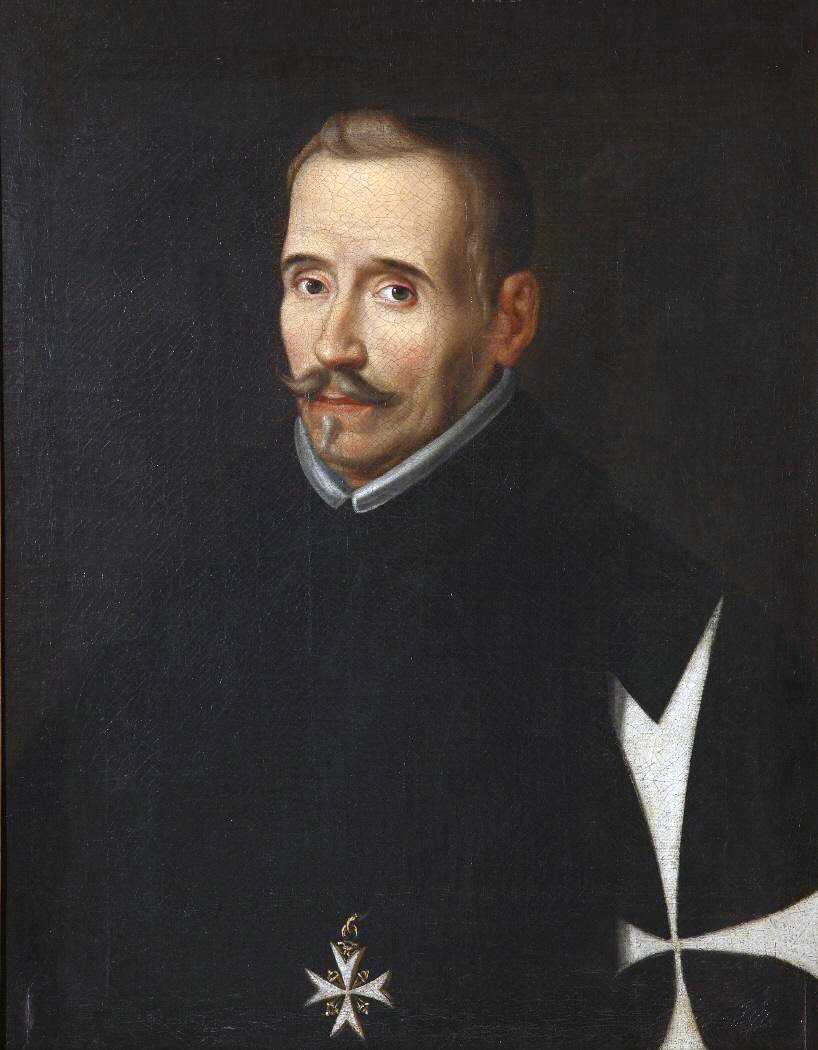
Lope de Vega

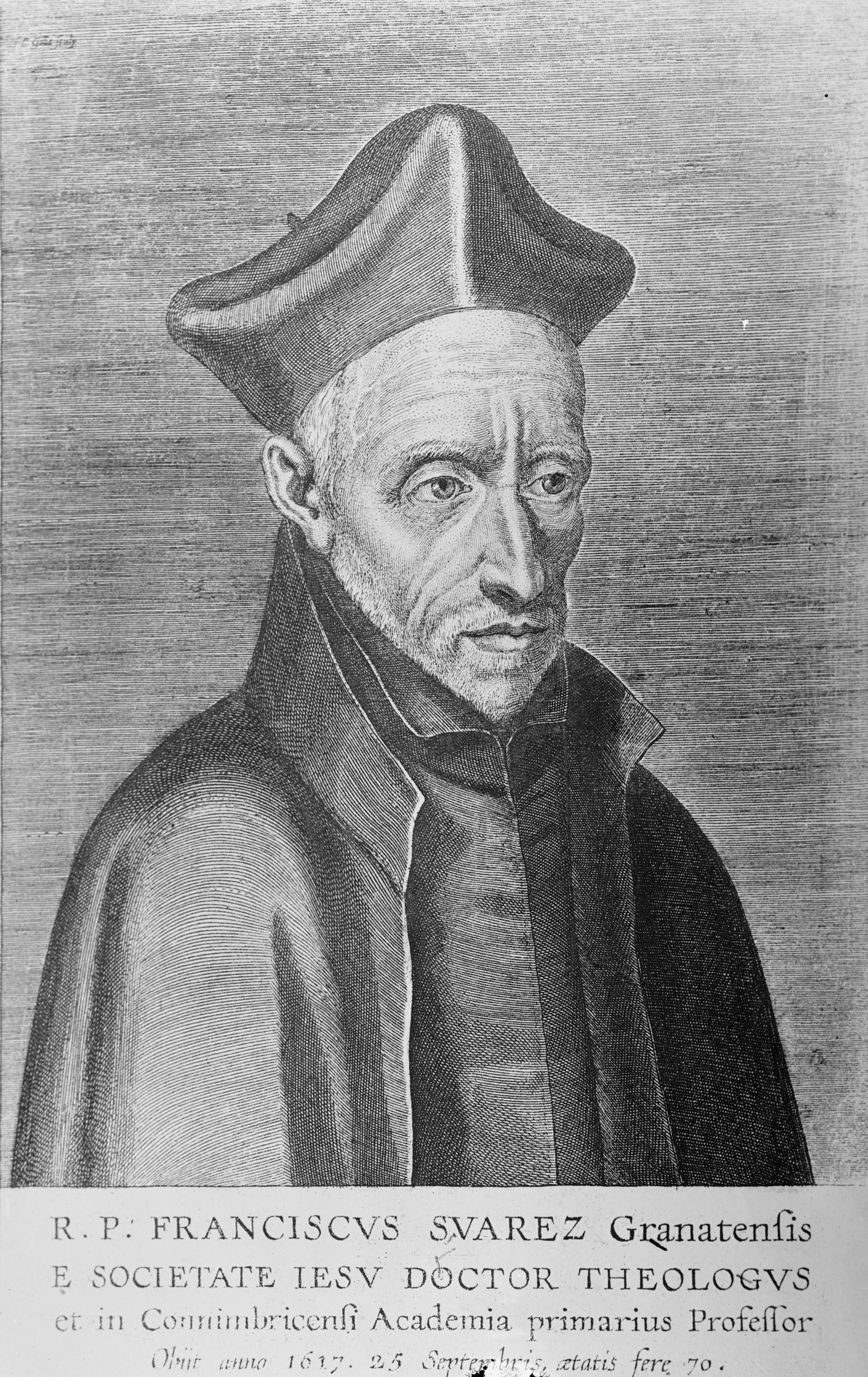
Francisco Suárez

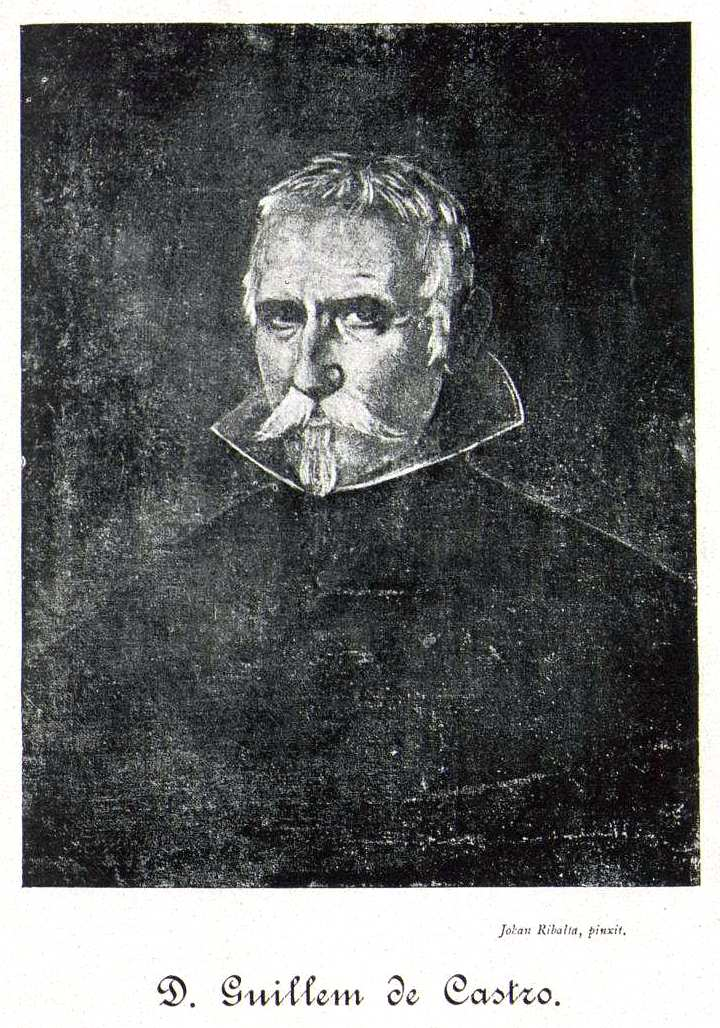
Guillén de Castro

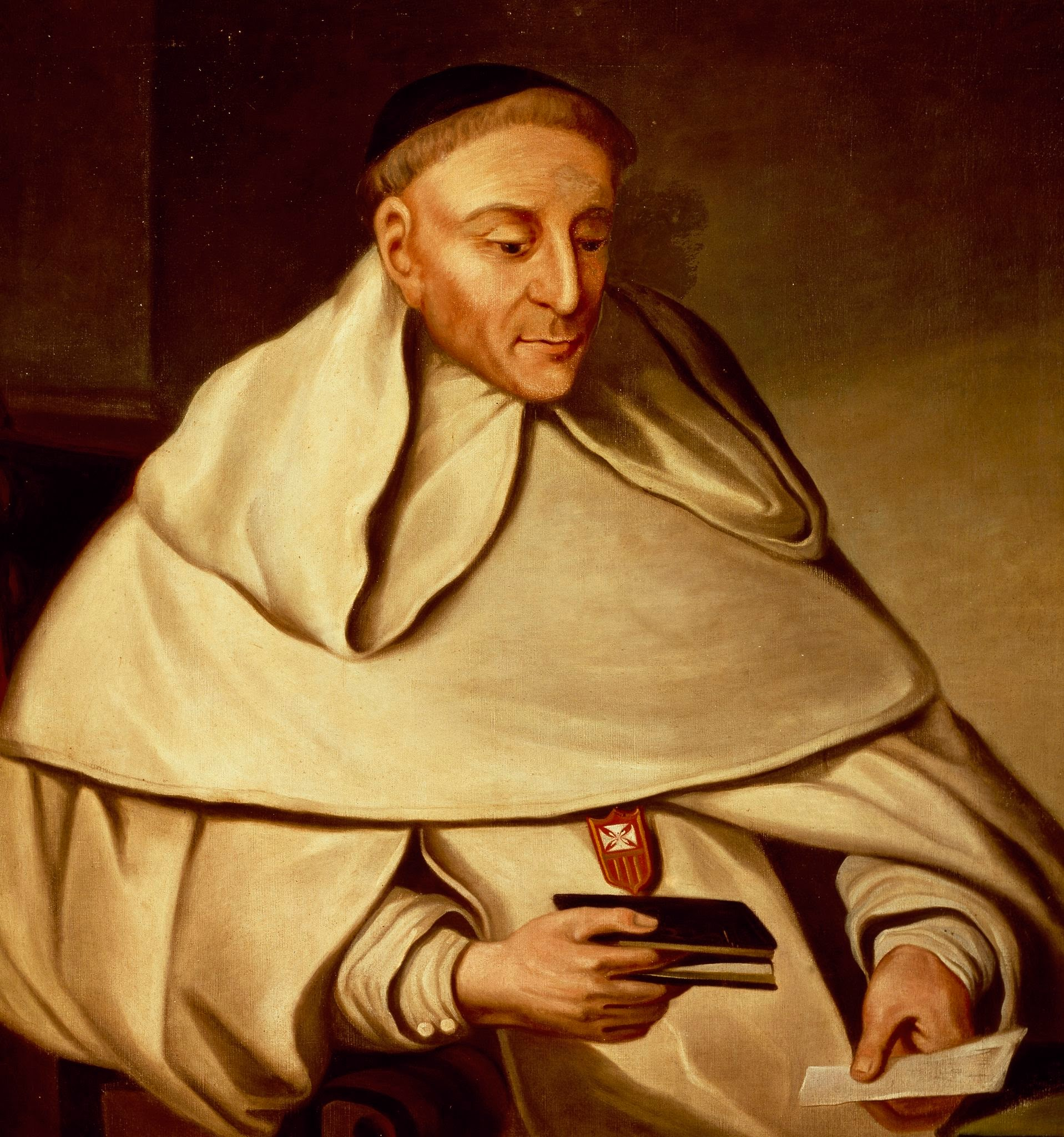
Tirso de Molina

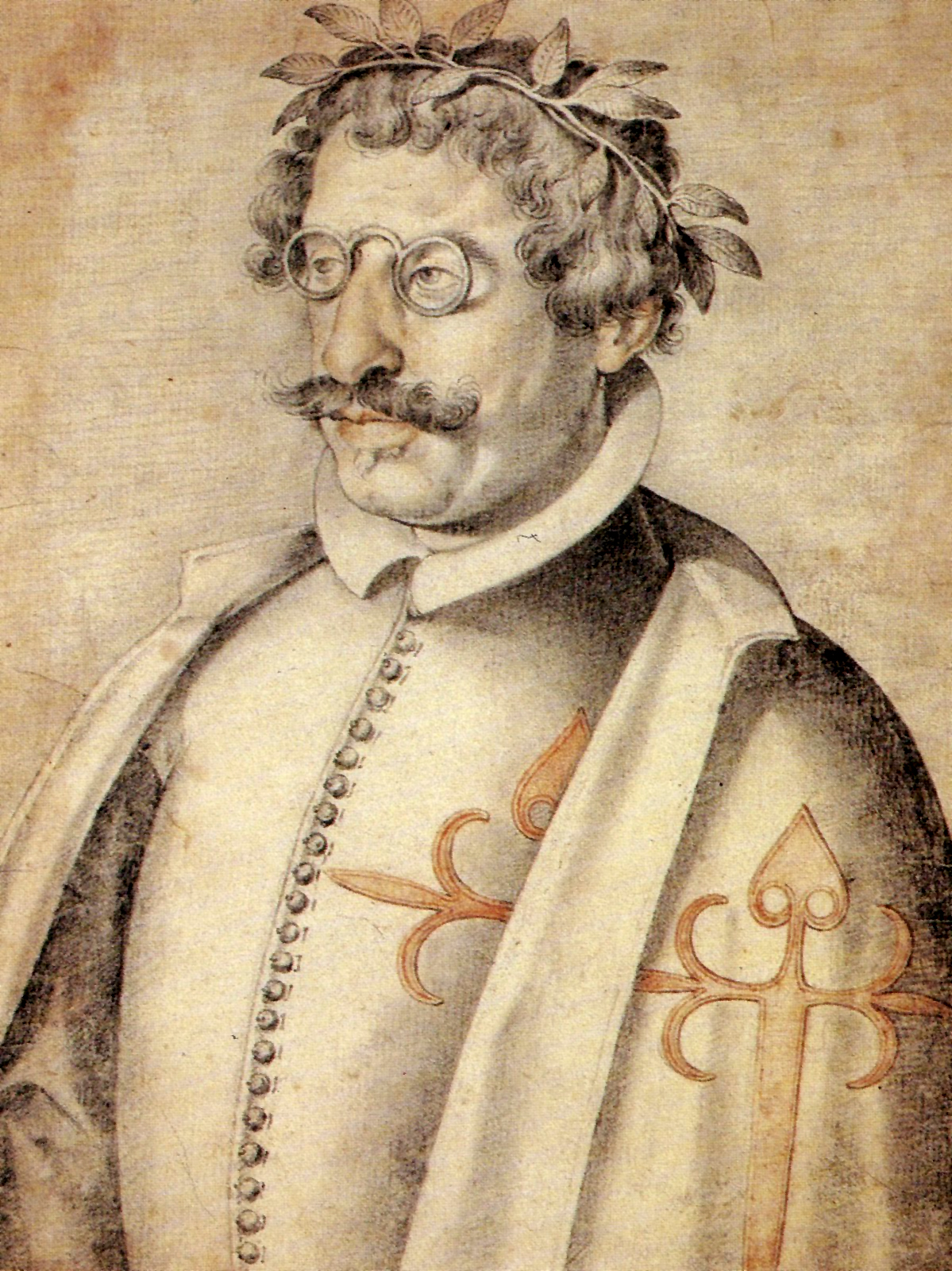
Francisco de Quevedo

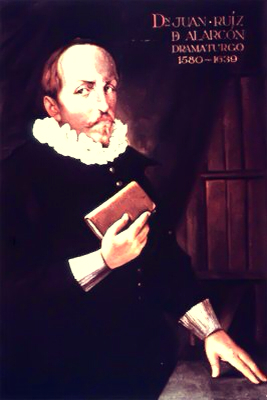
Juan Ruiz de Alarcón

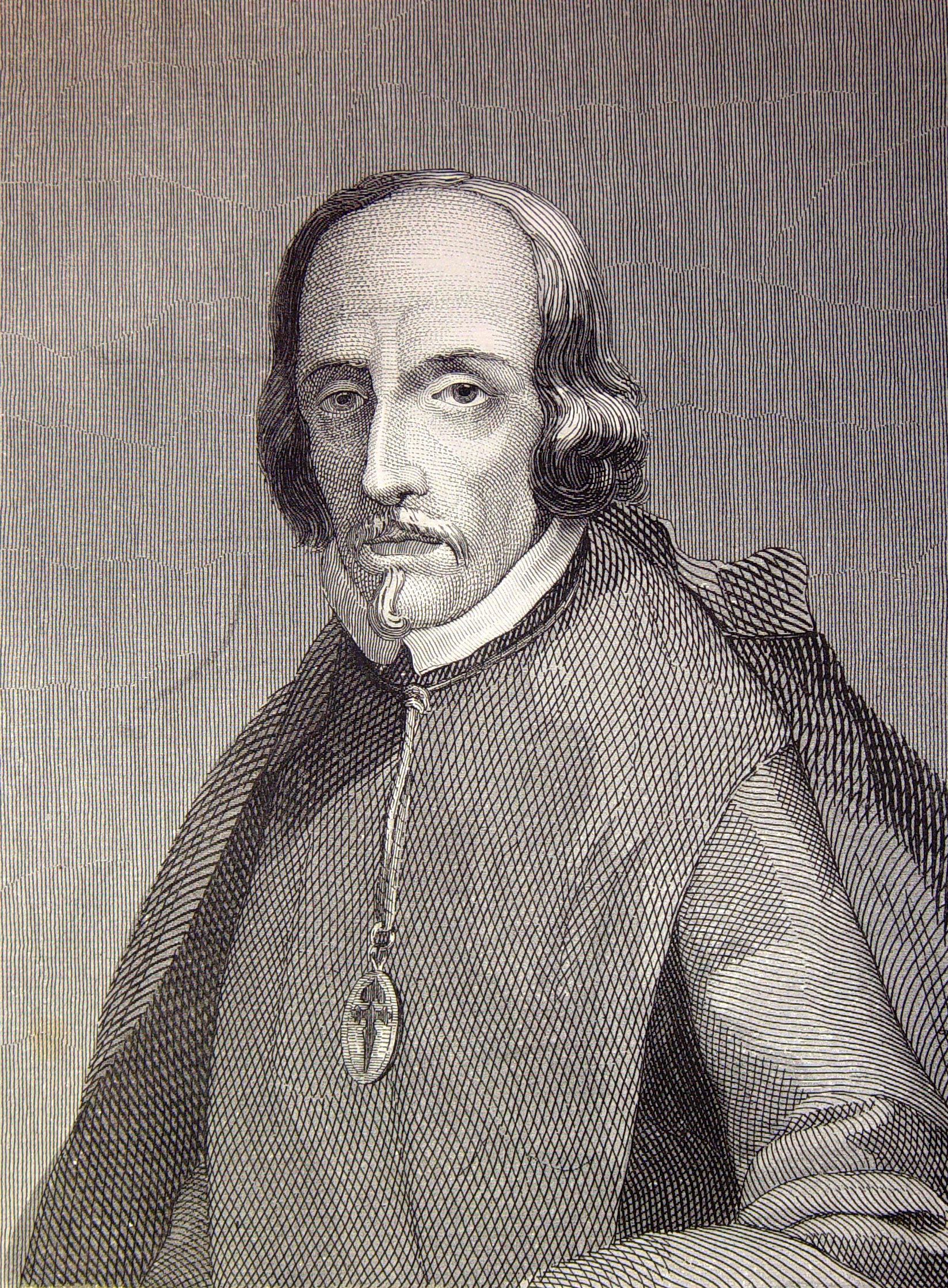
Pedro Calderón de la Barca

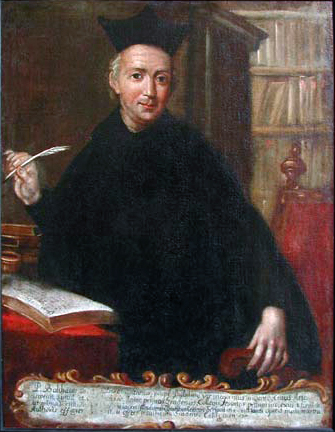
Baltasar Gracián

== Enlightenment ==
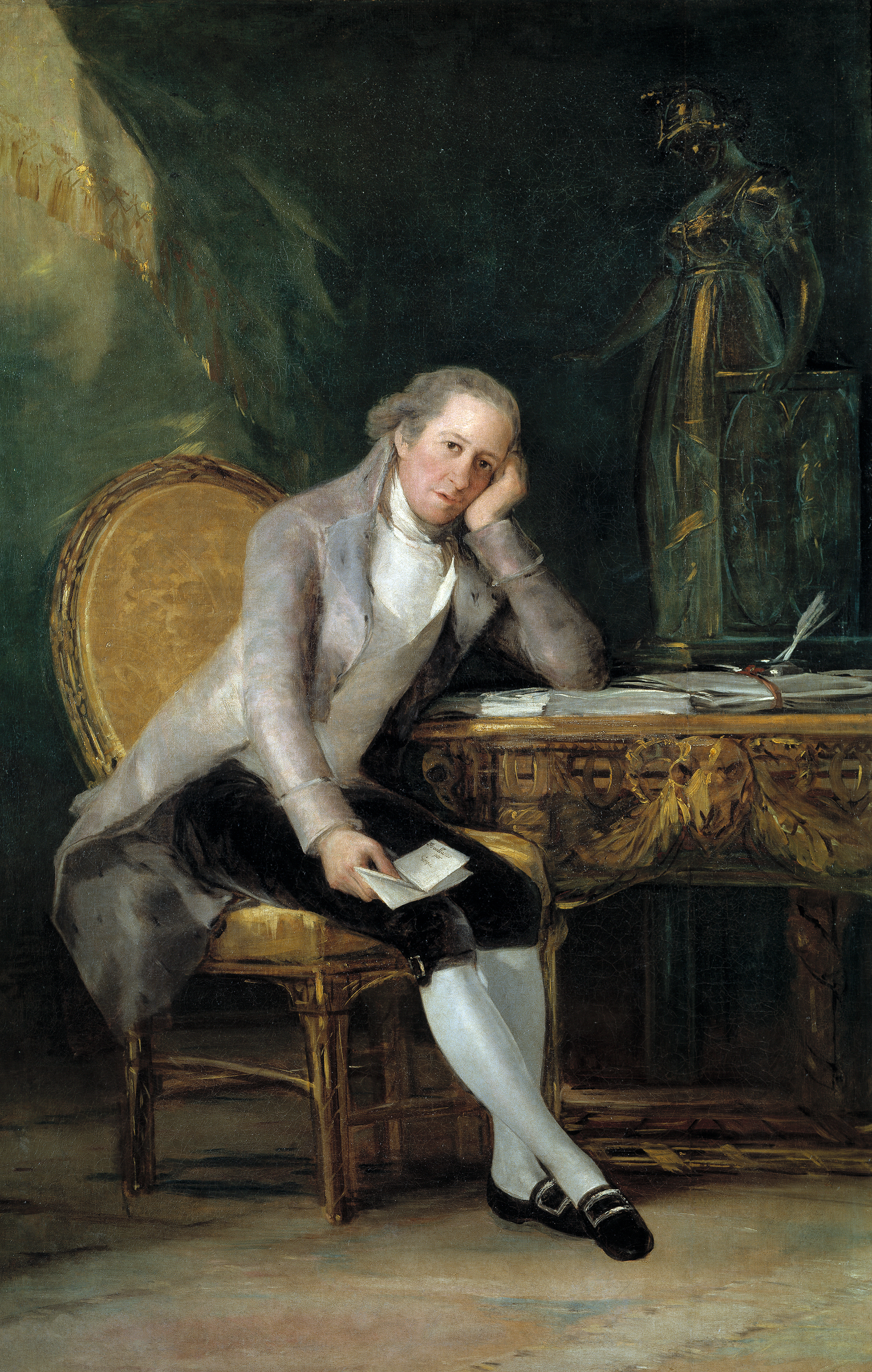
Gaspar Melchor de Jovellanos

In the Enlightenment of the 18th century, with the arrival of "the lights" to Spain, important topics are the prose of Fray Benito Jerónimo Feijoo, Gaspar Melchor de Jovellanos, and José Cadalso; the lyric of the Salmantine school (with Juan Meléndez Valdés), the lyric of the Madrilenian group (with the story-tellers Tomás de Iriarte and Félix María Samaniego), and the lyric of the Sevillian school; and also the theater, with Leandro Fernández de Moratín, Ramón de la Cruz and Vicente García de la Huerta. Enlightenment thinkers sought to apply systematic thinking to all forms of human activity, carrying it to the ethical and governmental spheres in exploration of the individual, society and the state.

Three phases in the Spanish literature of the 18th century are distinguished:

- Anti-Baroquism (until approximately 1750): It fights against the style of the preceding Baroque, which is considered excessively rhetorical and twisted. The recreational literature is not cultivated, but they are more interested in the essay and satire, utilizing the language with simplicity and purity.
- Neoclassicism (until the end of the 18th century): It is strongly influenced by French and Italian classicism. The writers also imitate the old classics (Greek and Roman); its boom extended since the reign of Fernando VI until the end of the century.
- Pre-Romanticism (end of the 18th and beginning of the 19th century): The influence of the English philosopher John Locke, together with that of the French Étienne Bonnot of Condillac, Jean-Jacques Rousseau, and Denis Diderot, will cause a new feeling, dissatisfaction with the tyranny of reason, that emphasizes the right of the individuals to express their personal emotions (repressed then by the neoclassicals), among which figures fundamentally love. This current announces the decline of Neoclassicism and opens the door to Romanticism.

== Romanticism ==
Early Romanticism appeared with the singular figure of Manuel José Quintana.

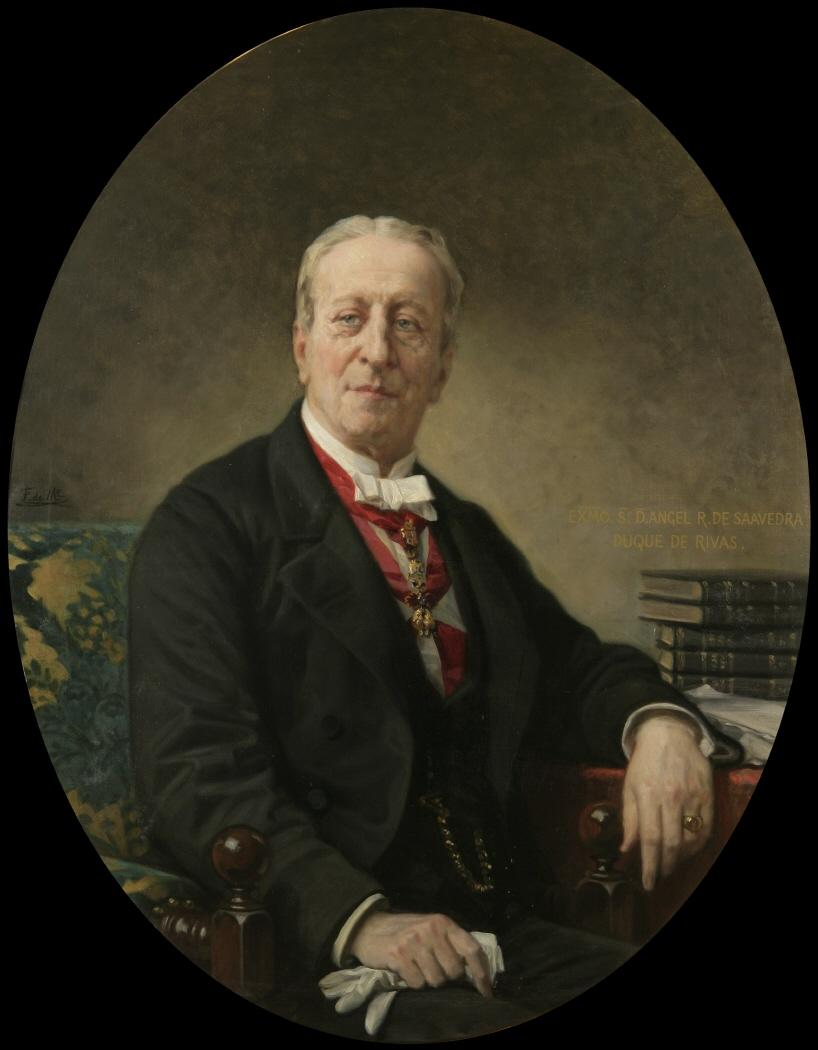
Ángel de Saavedra

In Romanticism (beginning of the 19th century) important topics are: the poetry of José de Espronceda and other poets; prose, which can have several forms (the historical novel, scientific prose, the description of regional customs, journalism —where Mariano José de Larra can be mentioned—; the theater, with Ángel de Saavedra (Duke of Rivas), José Zorrilla, and other authors. In the latter romanticism (post-romanticism) some appear:Gustavo Adolfo Bécquer and Rosalía de Castro. Some anti-romantic poets are Ramón de Campoamor and Gaspar Núñez de Arce. In part a revolt against aristocratic, social, and political norms of the Enlightenment period and a reaction against the rationalization of nature, in art and literature Romanticism stressed strong emotion as a source of aesthetic experience, placing new emphasis on such emotions as trepidation, horror, and the awe experienced in confronting the sublimity of nature. It elevated folk art, nature and custom.

The characteristics of the works of Romanticism are:

- Rejection of Neoclassicism. Contrary to the scrupulous severity and order with which the rules were observed in the 18th century, the romanticist writers combine the genres and verses of different measures, at times mixing verse and prose; in theater, the rule of the three units (place, space and time) is despised and they alternate comedy with drama.
- Subjectivism. Whatever kind of work it is, the exalted soul of the author pours into it all his feelings of dissatisfaction against a world that limits and breaks the flight of his desire about love, society, patriotism, etc. They do so in such a way that nature fuses with their state of spirit and it is melancholic, tetric, mysterious, dark... as opposed to the neoclassicals, who barely showed interest in the landscape. The longings for passionate love, desire for happiness, and possession of the infinite, cause a discomfort in the romanticist, an immense deception that from time to time carries them to suicide, as is the case of Mariano José de Larra.
- Attraction to the nocturnal and mysterious. The romantics situate their aching and disillusioned feelings in mysterious or melancholic places, such as ruins, forests, cemeteries... Similarly they feel an attraction toward the supernatural, things that escape any logic, such as miracles, apparitions, visions of the afterlife, the diabolic and the witchlike...
- Escape from the world that surrounds them. Rejection of the bourgeois society in which they are forced to live makes the romanticist be evaded from his circumstances, imagining passed epochs in which their ideals prevailed over the others, or being inspired in the exotic. In contrast with the neoclassicals, who admired the Greco-Latin antiquity, the romanticists prefer the Middle Ages and the Renaissance. Among their more frequent kinds of works, they cultivate the novel, legend and historic drama.

Various are the themes of the romanticist works:

- Oneself. In Espronceda's Song to Teresa, a heartwrenching confession of love and disillusion, he has managed to poeticize his feelings with great success.
- Passionate love, with sudden, total deliveries and quick abandonments. Exaltation and distaste.
- They are inspired in legendary and historic themes.
- Religion, although it is often in defiance of the consequent compassion and even exaltation of the devil.
- Social demands (revaluation of marginalized types, such as the beggar).
- Nature, shown in all its modalities and variations. Usually set in mysterious places, such as cemeteries, storms, the rough sea, etc.
- Satire, connected with political or literary events.
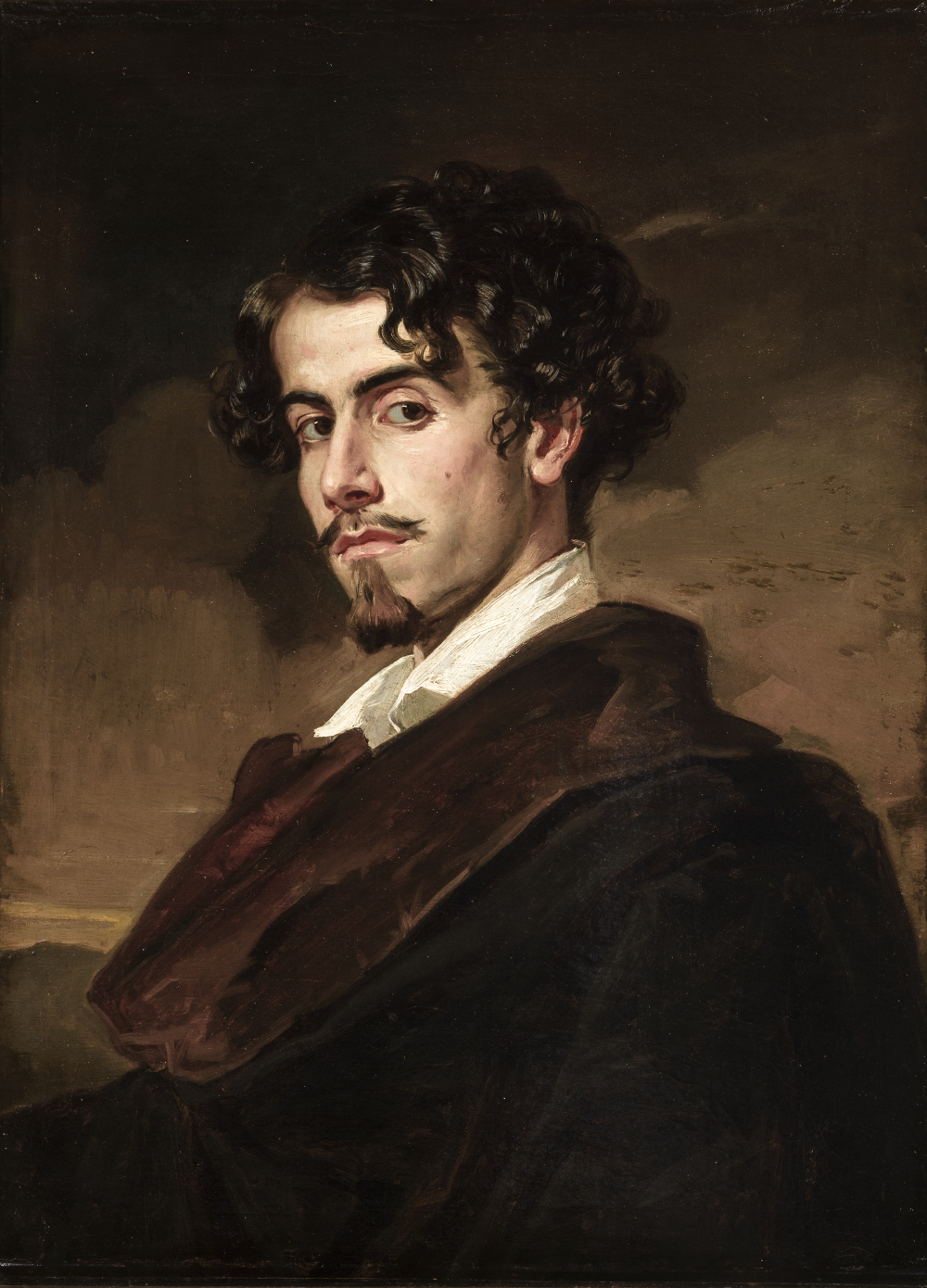
Gustavo Adolfo Bécquer

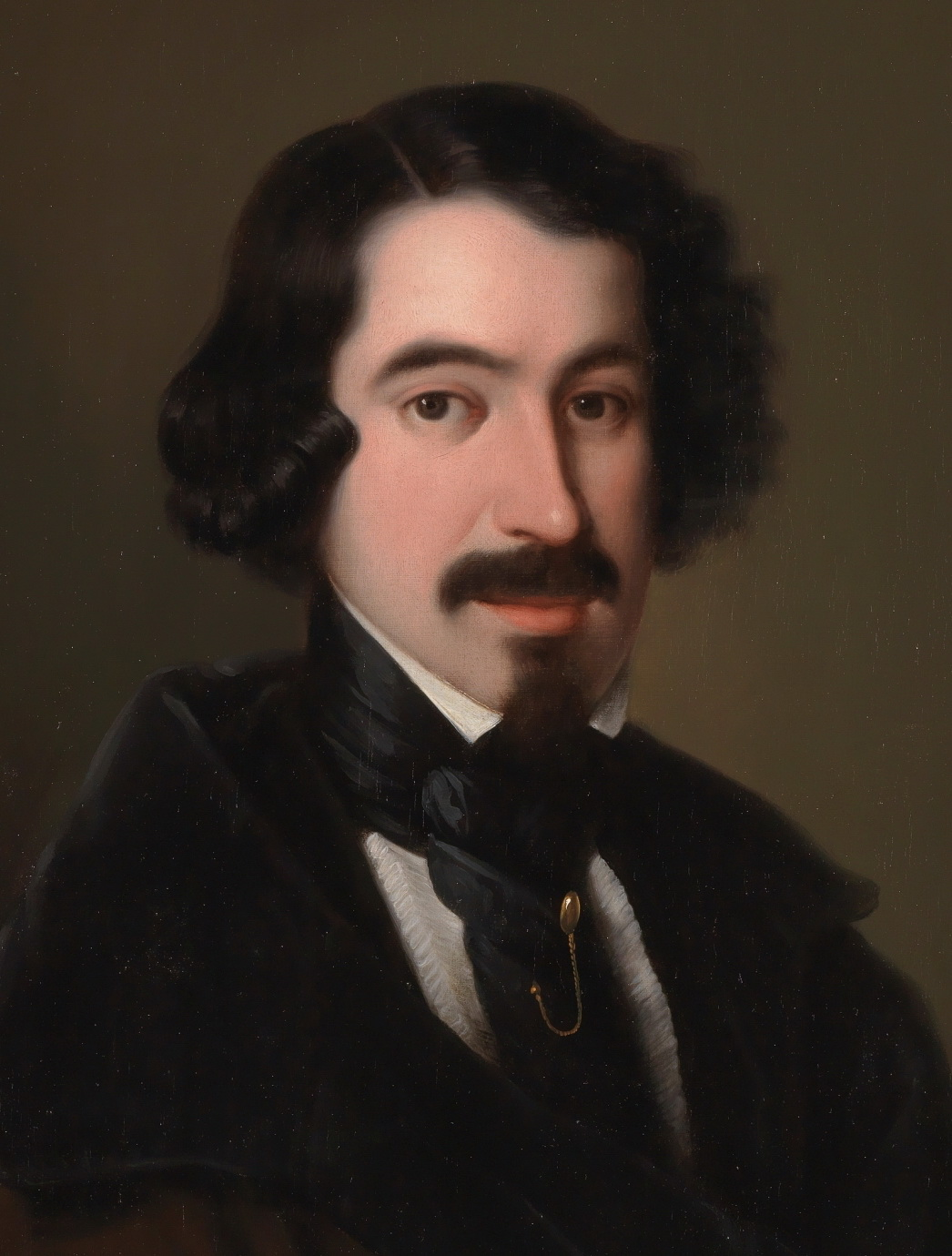
El escritor José de Espronceda, portrait by Antonio María Esquivel (c. 1845) (Museo del Prado, Madrid)

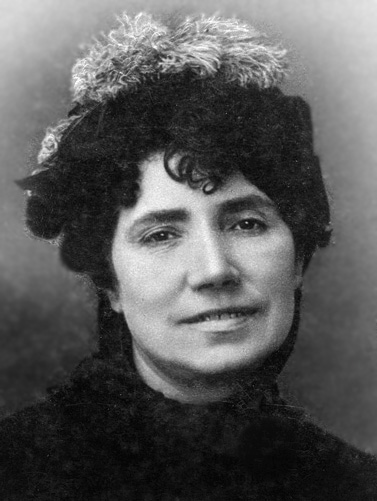
Rosalía de Castro

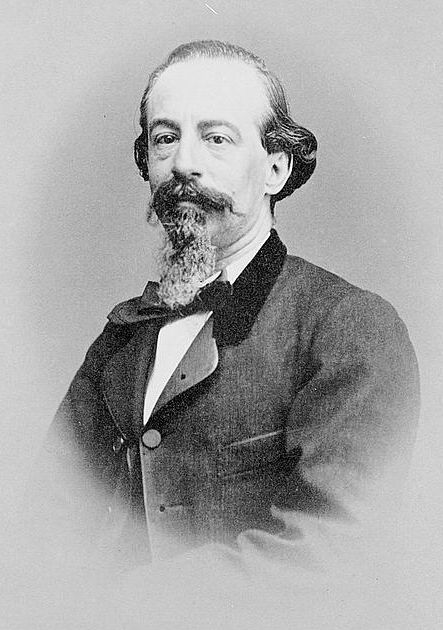
José Zorrilla

== Realism ==
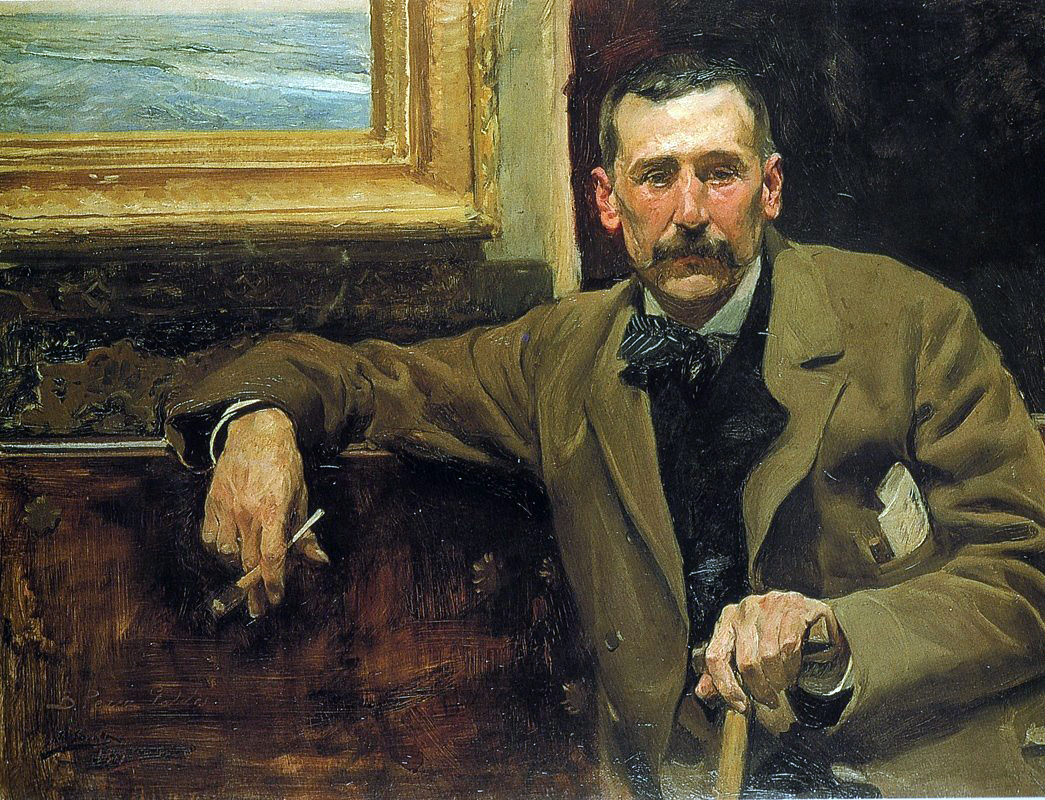
Portrait of Benito Pérez Galdós, by Joaquín Sorolla

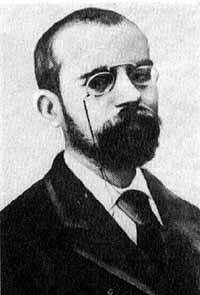
Leopoldo Alas, "Clarín"

In Realism (end of the 19th century), which is mixed with Naturalism, important topics are the novel, with Juan Valera, José María de Pereda, Benito Pérez Galdós, Emilia Pardo Bazán, Leopoldo Alas (Clarín), Armando Palacio Valdés, and Vicente Blasco Ibáñez; poetry, with Ramón de Campoamor, Gaspar Núñez de Arce, and other poets; the theater, with José Echegaray, Manuel Tamayo y Baus, and other dramatists; and the literary critics, emphasizing Menéndez Pelayo. Realism offered depictions of contemporary life and society 'as they were'. In the spirit of general "Realism," Realist authors opted for depictions of everyday and banal activities and experiences, instead of a romanticized or similarly stylized presentation.

The realistic works of this period are characterized by:

- Objective vision of reality through the direct observation of customs or psychological characters. They eliminate any subjective aspect, fantastic events, and every feeling that moves away from reality: "The novel is the image of life" (Galdós), "an artistic copy of reality" (Clarín).
- Defense of a thesis: the narrators write their works approaching reality from their moral conception. They are the so-called omniscient narrators. The defense of a thesis usually compromises the objectivity of the novel.
- Themes that are familiar to the reader: marital conflicts, infidelity, defense of ideals, etc.
- The popular and colloquial language acquires great importance since it situates the characters in their real environment.

== Modernist literature ==
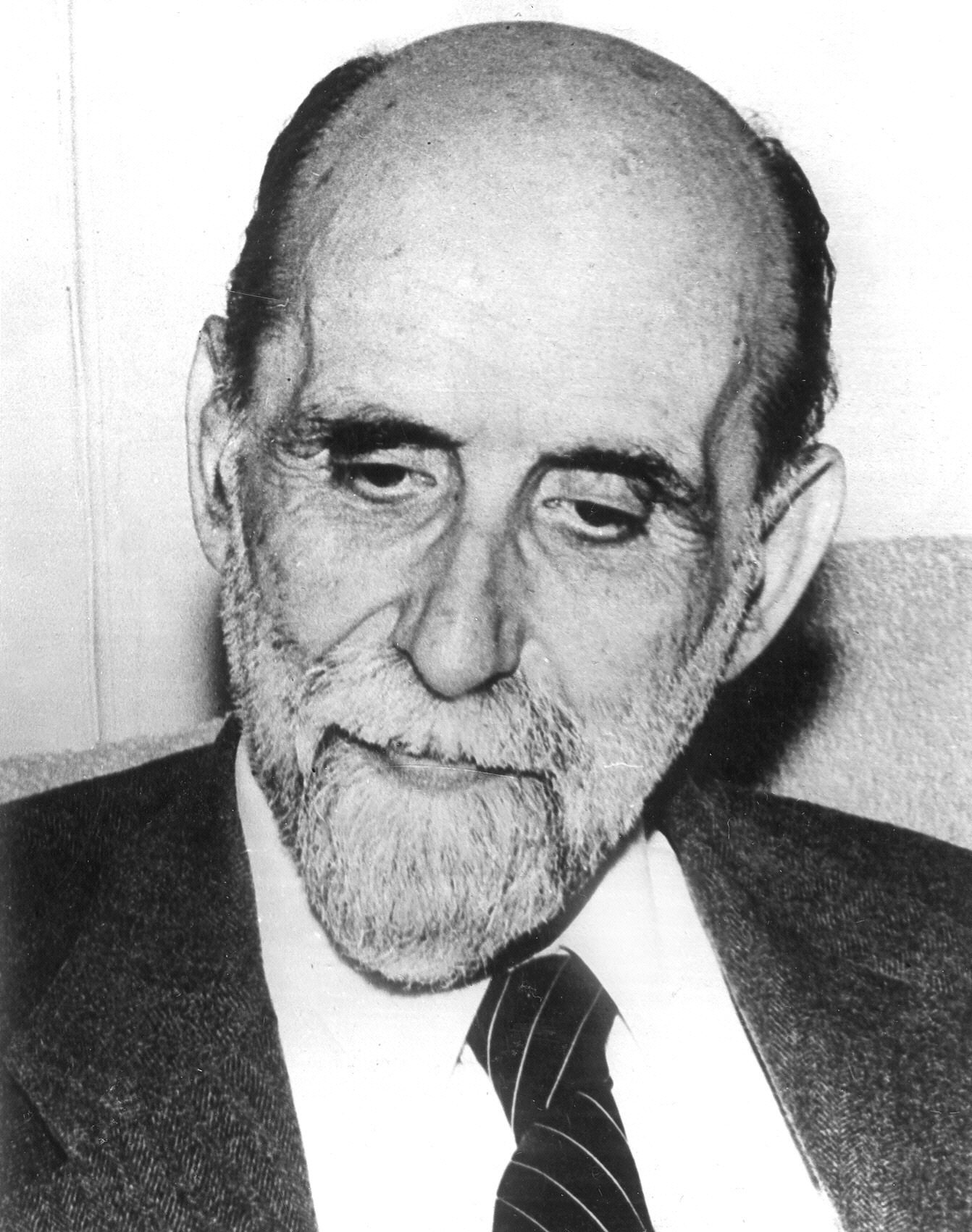
Juan Ramón Jiménez

In Modernism several currents appear: Parnassianism, Symbolism, Futurism, and Creationism. Literary Modernism in Spain was influenced by the "disaster of '98", Regenerationism, and the Free Institution of Education (founded by Giner de los Ríos). Modernism was rooted in the idea that "traditional" forms of art, literature, religious faith, social organization, and daily life had become outdated; therefore it was essential to sweep them aside. The intellectual movement that thinks objectively and scientifically about the causes of the decadence of Spain as a nation between the 19th and the 20th century is called Regenerationism. It expresses a pessimist judgement about Spain. The regenerationist intellectuals divulgated their studies in journals with a big diffusion, so the movement expanded. Some important Modernist authors are Salvador Rueda, Juan Ramón Jiménez, Miguel de Unamuno and Rubén Darío.

== 20th century literature ==
=== The Generation of 1898 ===
The destruction of Spain's fleet in Cuba by U.S. gunboats in 1898 provoked a general cultural crisis in Spain. The "Disaster" of 1898 led established writers to seek practical political, economic, and social solutions in essays grouped under the literary heading of "Regeneracionismo". For a group of younger writers, among them Miguel de Unamuno, Pío Baroja, and José Martínez Ruiz (Azorín), the Disaster and its cultural repercussions inspired a deeper, more radical literary shift that affected both form and content. These writers, along with Ramón del Valle-Inclán, Antonio Machado, Ramiro de Maeztu, and Ángel Ganivet, came to be known as the "Generation of 98". The label from its outset was controversial and even Azorín, the source of its origin, came to reject it. Nevertheless, it stuck as a way to describe a group of writers who turned in content from the more general exploration of universal middle class values characteristic of Nineteenth Century Realism to an obsession with questions of a more national nature. Their articles, essays, poems, and novels exploring Spanish history and geography carried existential overtones, expressing overall a sense of deep malaise at the social injustice, political bungling, and cultural indifference evident in contemporary Spanish society.

Within a matter of years, these young authors had transformed their nation’s literary landscape. To be sure, established nineteenth century realists, such as Benito Pérez Galdós, continued to write novels and theater into the second decade of the twentieth century, and, again in the case of Galdós, were much admired by the new generation of writers. Nevertheless, with the novels of Unamuno, Azorín, Pío Baroja, and Valle Inclán, the theater of the latter, and the poetry of Antonio Machado and Unamuno, a definitive literary shift had taken place—a shift in both form and content—pointing towards the more celebrated experimental writings of Spain's vanguard writers of the 1920s.

Thanks to Azorín's designation of his fellow writers as a “generation", contemporary critics and later literary historians were to catalogue and then interpret the arrival of new batches of authors in such generational terms for nearly the next one hundred years. Certainly, the terminology possesses a certain organizational elegance and indeed, recognizes the significant impact of major political and cultural events on changing literary expressions and tastes (for example, the 1898 connection, or a 1927 literary celebration that briefly united nearly every major vanguard poet in Spain).

=== The Generation of 1914 or Novecentismo ===
The next supposed “generation" of Spanish writers following those of ´98 already calls into question the value of such terminology. By the year 1914—the year of the outbreak of the First World War and of the publication of the first major work of the generation's leading voice, José Ortega y Gasset—a number of slightly younger writers had established their own place within the Spanish cultural field. Leading voices include the poet Juan Ramón Jiménez, the academics and essayists Ramón Menéndez Pidal, Gregorio Marañón, Manuel Azaña, Eugenio d'Ors, and Ortega y Gasset, and the novelists Gabriel Miró, Ramón Pérez de Ayala, and Ramón Gómez de la Serna. While still driven by the national and existential questions that obsessed the writers of ´98, they approached these topics with a greater sense of distance and objectivity. These writers had enjoyed more formal academic training than their predecessors, many taught within the walls of academia, and one, Azaña, was to become President and face of the Second Republic. Their genre of choice were the essay and the article, their arguments more systematic, and their tastes, more European.

In contrast to Unamuno's existential obsessions or Machado's conceptual, earth-bound verse, Juan Ramón's poetry pursued a more esoteric version of beauty and truth above all, while still manifesting an internalized sense of the existential dilemmas that plagued intellectuals in the first half of the twentieth century. Juan Ramón was Spain's great modernist poet and the maestro of the coming vanguardist Generation of 1927. In 1957 he was awarded the Nobel Prize for literature. José Ortega y Gasset became the spokesman for this and essential every generation of writers in the first half of the twentieth century. In essays like “Meditations on the Quijote," “The Rebellion of the Masses," and most famously, “The Dehumanization of Art," Ortega laid out theories of art and society that lucidly explained and celebrated twentieth century vanguard experimentation while holding fast to an elitist social vision whose eclipse this art ironically expressed. The most elusive voice of this generation, and arguably, unclassifiable within this group was the novelist Ramón Gómez de la Serna who carried the narrative experiments of Unamuno and Valle Inclán to absurd extremes, such as in his 1923 novel, El novelista, where varieties of plays with narrative subjectivity result in chapters envisioned through the eyes and voice of street lamps. More approachable and enduring are Gómez de la Serna's “Greguerías," an original form of aphorism that he described as “humor plus metaphor."

=== The Generation of 1927 ===
Around 1920 a younger group of writers—mostly poets—began publishing works that from their beginnings revealed the extent to which younger artists were absorbing the literary experimentation of the writers of 1898 and 1914. Poets Pedro Salinas, Jorge Guillén, Federico García Lorca, Vicente Aleixandre, Dámaso Alonso, Rafael Alberti, Luis Cernuda, Manuel Altolaguirre were likewise the most closely tied to formal academia yet. Novelists such as Benjamín Jarnés, Rosa Chacel, Francisco Ayala, and Ramón J. Sender were equally experimental and academic. Many of this generation were full-time university professors, while others spent periods as guest teachers and students. All were scholars of their national literary heritage, again evidence of the impact of the calls of “Regeneracionistas" and the Generation of 1898 for Spanish intelligence to turn at least partially inwards.

This group of poets continues to be, without contest, the most celebrated and studied of Spain's twentieth century writers. Their work provides a capstone to what some have called the “Silver Age" of Spanish Letters, a period that began with the veritable explosion of novel production following the bloodless coup of 1868 and that would come to a tragic end with the outbreak of civil war in July 1936.

The writing of this supposed generation can be roughly divided into three moments. In their early years their work arises still out of mostly local and national traditions, culminating in their united celebration of the tri-centennial of the death of Golden Age poet Luis de Góngora. From mid decade until the arrival of Spain's Second Republic in 1931, the Generation's poets reached the apex of their experimental writings, manifesting a clear awareness of the international vanguard “—isms" sweeping major Western capitals of the day. After 1931, the Generation's writing increasingly displays the imprint of the political and social stresses that would lead to Spain's bloody civil war.

=== The Spanish Civil War ===
The Spanish Civil War, lasting from July 1936 to April 1939, had a devastating impact on the trajectory of Spanish letters. In July 1936, Spain was at the height of its Silver Age. Every major writer of the three major generations—1898, 1914, and 1927—was still alive and productive. Those of 1914 and 1927 were at the height or just reaching the height of their literary powers. Several were recognized among Western civilization's most talented and influential writers. But by April 1939, Miguel de Unamuno, Antonio Machado, and Federico García Lorca, among others, were dead. All but a small handful of the remaining writers had fled into exile, dispersed across the length of the American continent, most never to enjoy the close associations of conferences, tertulias, and theater premiers that had so often united them in pre-war Madrid.

Among the handful of civil war poets and writers, Miguel Hernández stands out. A young disciple and associate of the Generation of 1898, Hernández, like Lorca, became a martyr to the Republican cause but this time as a post-war prisoner, fighting and writing as a soldier poet throughout the war and then languishing and dying in one of Franco's prisons in 1942. Among his important works, Perito en lunas (1933) from his pre-war surrealist days, and Viento del pueblo (1937), evidence of the work of a soldier-poet, stand out.

=== Witnessing the early dictatorship (1939–1955) ===
The earliest years of the post-war were characterized more by hunger, repression, and suffering than by any significant literature. The published works of this period were true to pseudo-fascist dictator Francisco Franco's reactionary vision of a second Spanish golden age than to the material and existential anguish facing the majority of the country's population of the time. Neo-baroque poetry and paeans to Franco's Spain satisfied the censors but has enjoyed no subsequent critical shelf-life.

Ironically, the narrative production of one of Franco's censors would provide the first sign of literary revival in post-war Spain. In 1942, Camilo José Cela's novel, La familia de Pascual Duarte, used just enough experimental arrangement (temporally disjointed narrative development to problematize simple accusations of political cause-effect critique; prefaces and post-scripts that confuse authorial intentions) to avoid the censors´ cuts and to present to discerning Spanish readers an exposé of a spiritually troubled, socially impoverished, and structurally violent society. Cela was to remain for the next five decades as one of Spain's most important novelists, eventually receiving the Nobel Prize for literature in 1989.

With the 1945 publication of the Nadal Prize-winning Nada by Carmen Laforet and the 1947 release of Miguel Delibes's La sombra del ciprés es alargada, readers of the intellectual Spanish narrative at last had cause for hope. While the experimentation of Spain's "Silver Age" writers had disappeared, Cela, Laforet, and Delibes at least showed a renewed commitment to a kind of writing that first, was connected to Spain's material reality, and second, would stretch itself in its attempts to capture the experience.

By the middle of the next decade, a whole new generation of novelists was latching onto the early models laid down by Cela and Laforet. Equally influenced by the films of the Italian neorealists, novelists such as Luis Romero (La noria, 1951), Rafael Sánchez Ferlosio (El Jarama, 1956), Jesús Fernández Santos (Los bravos, 1956), Carmen Martín Gaite (Entre visillos, 1957), Ignacio Aldecoa (El fulgor y la sangre, 1954), and Juan Goytisolo (Juegos de manos, 1954) produced a social-realist tradition that was as celebrated as it was short-lived.

Spanish poetry experienced renewal along similar lines. Dámaso Alonso's poem, "Insomnia" (1947), captures much of the angst and sense of violence that informed the works of Cela et al. and that would infuse the Spanish poetry of the era:

Madrid es una ciudad de más de un millón de cadáveres (según las últimas estadísticas).
A veces en la noche yo me revuelvo y me incorporo en este nicho en el que hace 45 años que me pudro,
y paso largas horas oyendo gemir al huracán, o ladrar los perros, o fluir blandamente la luz de la luna.
Y paso largas horas gimiendo como el huracán, ladrando como un perro enfurecido, fluyendo como la leche de la ubre caliente de una gran vaca amarilla.
Y paso largas horas preguntándole a Dios, preguntándole por qué se pudre lentamente mi alma,
por qué se pudren más de un millón de cadáveres en esta ciudad de Madrid,
por qué mil millones de cadáveres se pudren lentamente en el mundo.
Dime, ¿qué huerto quieres abonar con nuestra podredumbre?
¿Temes que se te sequen los grandes rosales del día, las tristes azucenas letales de tus noches?

Poems by José Hierro, Blas de Otero, and Gabriel Celaya were more direct, penning poems with such transparent titles as Canto a España (Hierro), A la inmensa mayoría (Otero), or La poesía es un arma cargada de futuro (Celaya).

=== Economic and cultural renewal (1955–1975) ===
However, by the mid-1950s, just as with the novel, a new generation which had only experienced the Spanish civil war in childhood was coming of age. While still informed by the material social and political conditions of Spanish society, the works of Ángel González, Claudio Rodríguez, José Ángel Valente, José Agustín Goytisolo, Francisco Brines, and Gloria Fuertes among others are less politically committed. Scholars differentiate these poets´ social focus as one of communication of experience versus Hierro's and Celaya's representation of experience. That is, while these younger poets were still interested in talking about Spain, they were at least equally focused on the interactive processes of communication with the reader who was contemporaneously living these experiences. Rather than passively ingest the poet's vision of contemporary society, the poets of what came to be called variously the generation of 1956 or “of the 1960s" produced poetry that engaged the reader in the interpretation if not the production of that vision.

By the early 1960s, the brief social realist burst in narrative was already growing stale. Numerous novelists took a brief hiatus from writing. The general consensus as a new decade began was that the straightforward “realism" of the previous decade, while manifesting the brutal “truth" of contemporary Spanish life under Franco, ultimately failed politically in that it directly modeled the very transparent discourse used so effectively by the authoritarian regime to crush the very opposition to which these writers aspired. Shaped in part by the French "nouveau roman" of writers like Alain Robbe-Grillet, the French "La Nouvelle Vague" cinema of Godard and Truffaut, and Latin American “Boom", Spanish novelists and poets, beginning perhaps with Luis Martín Santos's novel, Tiempo de silencio (1961), returned to the restless literary experimentation last seen in Spanish letters in the early 1930s. Among Spain's most celebrated “New Novels" of this period, Juan Benet's Volverás a Región (1967), Camilo José Cela's San Camilo, 36 (1969), Miguel Delibes's Cinco horas con Mario (1966), Juan Goytisolo's so called “Trilogy of Treason" consisting of Señas de identidad (1966), Reivindicación del conde Don Julián (1970), and Juan sin tierra (1975), Gonzalo Torrente Ballester's La saga/fuga de J. B. (1972), Juan Marsé's Si te dicen que caí (1973), and Luis Goytisolo's tetralogy Antagonía (1973–1981) stand out. While arguably pulling Spanish narrative by the collar from the relative dark of social realism towards the aesthetic standards of Europe's most elite avant-garde, many of these novels proved almost unreadable to much of the public, a reality nicely embodied at the end of Juan Goytisolo's trilogy when an already deconstructed Spanish prose gradually transforms into an unreadable Arabic.

The novel's experimentation was shadowed in Spanish poetry. José María Castellet's publication of Nueve novísimos poetas españoles recognized a group of artists whose works had similarly returned to early century experimentation. The works of Pere Gimferrer, Guillermo Carnero, and Leopoldo Panero, arguably the most important poets of the group, manifest a decidedly baroque style full of oblique cultural references, metapoetic devices, and other forms of extreme poetic self-consciousness spilling into the precious. Like the works of the New Novelists, this poetry was for a select group of readers, if not exclusive to the poets themselves.

=== Writing in the democracy (1975–1999) ===
When Franco at last died in November 1975, the important work of establishing democracy had an immediate impact on Spanish letters. Elitist narrative and poetry quickly gave way to narrative and poetry interested anew in not merely teaching (via content or style) but in delighting. Storytelling became the mantra for a new generation of Spanish novelists. Eduardo Mendoza's The Truth about the Savolta Case (1975) invited readers to escape to the roaring 1920s of Spain's pre-political, culturally vibrant Silver Age. While availing itself of various “New Novel" experiments such as narrative fragmentation, the use of mixed media, and the presence of numerous often contradictory narrative voices, Mendoza's novel could be read and enjoyed as an adventure story with romantic and dramatic appeal.

Carmen Martín Gaite's 1978 novel, El cuarto de atrás, was another manifestation of the melding of experiment with old-fashioned storytelling, using various narrative levels to explore dark memories of Spain's recent political past but with the light, ironic touch of a romance novel. Over the next several years a wealth of young new writers, among them Juan José Millás, Rosa Montero, Javier Marías, Luis Mateo Díez, José María Merino, Félix de Azúa, Cristina Fernández Cubas, Enrique Vila-Matas, Carme Riera, and later Antonio Muñoz Molina and Almudena Grandes, would begin carving out a prominent place for themselves within the Spanish cultural field. During the 1980s, Spanish narrative began appearing regularly on best seller lists for the first time since the pre-war era and many of this new generation became literary and cultural celebrities, living off their work as writers

By the 1990s, the pressure to produce for the large publishing houses was clearly diminishing the early literary promise of some of these writers. On the other hand, some like Javier Marías, after publishing since the early 1970s, finally achieved international fame, appearing on best-seller lists throughout Europe. Marías's novels Corazón tan blanco (1992) and Mañana en la batalla piensa en mí (1994), and his ever-expanding experiment with real fiction (begun with 1989's Todas las almas and continued through weekly newspaper columns, 1998's Negra espalda del tiempo, and extended in his 21st century trilogy, Tu rostro mañana), placed him on numerous critics´ Nobel Prize shortlists.

The big money available through novel publishing manifested itself in the 1990s in the explosion of literary prizes, awarded in Spain, unlike the UK's Man Booker or the U.S.'s Pulitzer, to unpublished works. Literary prizes became little more than publicity opportunities. The long-standing Planeta and Nadal prizes, already media events, grew in importance and remuneration. They were joined during the decade by the Primavera, Alfaguara, and Lara Prizes, the return of the Café Gijón and the Biblioteca Breve prizes. Most carried large sums for the winners and guaranteed—often obligated—long international book tours.

Two developments in the literary industry were the emergence of the literary superstar and the literary celebrity. Arturo Pérez-Reverte, a journalist who became a novelist, achieved critical recognition while attaining high sales figures with many of his novels. Several of his works have also been adapted into films. Other writers associated with literary celebrity included Antonio Muñoz Molina, Jon Juaristi, Ray Loriga, José Ángel Mañas, and Lucía Etxebarría.

Loriga, Mañas, and Etxebarría were associated with the literary group sometimes described by critics as the "Generación X." Their work has been characterized as combining elements of black humor and post-political social realism, with themes including sex, drugs, popular music, and mental illness. Their prominence was also associated with increased media and commercial attention to their work.

New novelists whose work is more likely to endure that began publishing in this period include Rafael Chirbes, Belén Gopegui, David Trueba, the Basque writers Bernardo Atxaga and Álvaro Bermejo, and the Galician's Manuel Rivas and Suso de Toro among others. In the final decade of the 1990s, then, arguably five generations of writers—from Cela, to Sánchez Ferlosio, to Mendoza, to Muñoz Molina, to the Generation X authors—were sharing the expanding literary space of Spanish narrative. Notwithstanding the abundance of prize money that threatened to drown out quality with media-generated noise, the Spanish literary field at the end of the twentieth century was as promising as it had not been since the 1920s.

== Contemporary literature ==
Javier Marías is widely considered as the most distinguished author in contemporary Spanish literature. Other acclaimed and widely read writers both nationally and internationally are Enrique Vila-Matas, Rosa Montero, Antonio Muñoz Molina, as well as more commercial authors like Carlos Ruiz Zafón. In recent years authors such as Elvira Navarro and Javier Cercas have published acclaimed best-selling novels.

== Outline ==
- Middle Ages
  - Epics:
    - The Lay of the Cid
    - Poema de Fernán González
    - Mocedades de Rodrigo
  - Alfonso X
  - Juan Ruiz (Libro de buen amor)
  - Gonzalo de Berceo (Milagros de Nuestra Señora)
  - Jorge Manrique (Coplas a la muerte de su padre)
- Renaissance and Baroque (Siglo de oro)
  - The classical prose
    - Anonymous (Lazarillo de Tormes)
    - Fernando de Rojas (La Celestina)
    - Alonso de Ercilla (La Araucana)
    - Bernal Díaz del Castillo (Historia verdadera de la conquista de la Nueva España)
    - Bernardino de Sahagún (Historia General de las cosas de la Nueva España)
    - Mateo Alemán (Guzmán de Alfarache)
    - Baltasar Gracián (El Criticón)
    - Miguel de Cervantes (Don Quixote, Novelas ejemplares)
  - The classical Spanish theater
    - Juan del Encina
    - Lope de Rueda
    - Guillén de Castro (Las Mocedades del Cid)
    - Lope de Vega (El perro del hortelano, Fuenteovejuna)
    - Pedro Calderón de la Barca (La vida es sueño)
    - Tirso de Molina (El burlador de Sevilla)
    - Juan Ruiz de Alarcón
  - Spanish classical poetry
    - Garcilaso de la Vega
    - Juan Boscán
    - Fray Luis de León
    - Luis de Góngora
    - Francisco de Quevedo
    - Saint John of the Cross
    - Saint Teresa of Ávila
  - Philosophy
    - Francisco de Vitoria
    - Juan Luis Vives
    - Antonio de Nebrija (Gramática Castellana)
    - Gómez Pereira
    - Bartolomé de las Casas (Brevísima relación de la destrucción de las Indias)
    - Francisco Suárez
    - Luis de Molina
- The 18th century
  - Neoclassical prose
    - José Cadalso (Cartas marruecas, Noches lúgubres)
    - Benito Jerónimo Feijoo
    - José Francisco de Isla
    - Gaspar Melchor de Jovellanos
  - Neoclassical poetry
    - Tomás de Iriarte (Fábulas literarias)
    - Juan Meléndez Valdés
    - Félix María de Samaniego
  - Neoclassical theater
    - Vicente García de la Huerta (Raquel)
    - Leandro Fernández de Moratín (El sí de las niñas)
- The 19th century
  - Romanticists
    - Romantic Prose
      - Juan Donoso Cortés
      - Mariano José de Larra
      - Marcelino Menéndez Pelayo
    - Romantic poetry
      - Manuel José Quintana
      - Gustavo Adolfo Bécquer (Rhymes, Legends)
      - José de Espronceda (El estudiante de Salamanca, La canción del pirata)
      - Rosalía de Castro
    - Romantic theater
      - Adelardo López de Ayala
      - Antonio García Gutiérrez (El trovador)
      - Juan Eugenio Hartzenbusch (Los amantes de Teruel)
      - Francisco Martínez de la Rosa (La conjuración de Venecia)
      - Duque de Rivas (Don Álvaro o la fuerza del sino)
      - José Zorrilla (Don Juan Tenorio)
  - Realists
    - Benito Pérez Galdós (Fortunata y Jacinta, Episodios Nacionales, Misericordia)
    - Leopoldo Alas, Clarín (La Regenta, Su único hijo)
    - Vicente Blasco Ibáñez (Arroz y tartana, Los cuatro jinetes del Apocalipsis)
    - Emilia Pardo Bazán (Los pazos de Ulloa)
    - Enrique Gaspar y Rimbau (El anacronópete)
    - Pedro Antonio de Alarcón (El sombrero de tres picos)
    - Armando Palacio Valdés (La hermana San Sulpicio)
    - José María de Pereda (Sotileza)
    - Juan Valera (Pepita Jiménez, Juanita la Larga)
    - Concepción Arenal
- The 20th century
  - Generation of 98
    - Prose
      - Ángel Ganivet
      - Pío Baroja (The Tree of Knowledge)
      - Miguel de Unamuno (Mist)
      - José Martínez Ruiz, Azorín
    - Poetry
      - Antonio Machado (Soledades, Campos de Castilla)
      - Manuel Machado
      - Mario Satz
    - Theater
      - Jacinto Benavente (Los intereses creados)
      - Ramón del Valle-Inclán (Luces de bohemia, Martes de Carnaval)
  - Generation of 27
    - Rafael Alberti (Marinero en tierra)
    - Vicente Aleixandre
    - Dámaso Alonso (Hijos de la ira)
    - Manuel Altolaguirre
    - Luis Cernuda
    - Gerardo Diego
    - García Lorca (Yerma, La casa de Bernarda Alba)
    - Jorge Guillén
    - Leopoldo Panero
    - Emilio Prados
    - Pedro Salinas (La voz a ti debida)
    - Miguel Hernández (The farmer of more air, El rayo que no cesa)
  - Philosophy
    - George Santayana
    - María Zambrano
    - José Ortega y Gasset (Meditaciones sobre el Quijote)
    - Alexandre Deulofeu
    - Julián Marias
    - Fernando Savater
    - Xavier Zubiri
    - Eugenio d'Ors
  - Prose
    - Camilo José Cela (La colmena, La familia de Pascual Duarte)
    - Fernando Fernán Gómez (El viaje a ninguna parte)
    - Miguel Delibes (Cinco horas con Mario, Los santos inocentes)
    - Gonzalo Torrente Ballester (Los gozos y las sombras)
    - Manuel Vázquez Montalbán (Yo maté a Kennedy)
    - Max Aub
    - Salvador de Madariaga
  - Poetry
    - Ramón Gómez de la Serna (Greguerías)
    - Jorge Semprún
    - José Luis Cano
    - José María Pemán
  - Theater
    - Santiago Rusiñol
    - Alejandro Casona (La dama del alba)
    - Antonio Buero Vallejo (Historia de una escalera)
    - Manuel Azaña
    - Fernando Arrabal
    - Paloma Pedrero

== See also ==
- Latin American literature
- Philippine literature in Spanish
- List of Spanish-language authors
- List of Spanish-language poets
- Catalan literature
- Galician-language literature
- List of Asturian language authors
- The Premio Cervantes prize is awarded to honour the career of a writer in the Spanish language, regardless of nationality.
- José María Gironella
- Arabic literature, for literature produced in Islamic Spain
- Basque literature
