= Félix de Azúa =

Spanish writer and academic

The Most Excellent Félix de Azúa
- Born: Félix de Azúa Comella; 30 April 1944 (age 82); Barcelona, Spain

Seat H of the Real Academia Española
- Incumbent
- Assumed office 13 March 2016 (Note: Elected on 18 June 2015)
- Preceded by: Martí de Riquer i Morera

Félix de Azúa Comella (Barcelona, 30 April 1944) is a Spanish professor of aesthetics and philosophy, poet, novelist, essayist and translator, member of Real Academia Española.

He taught Spanish literature at the University of Oxford from 1979 to 1981. He was director of the Institut Cervantes in Paris. With Eduardo Mendoza Garriga, Manuel Vázquez Montalbán, José Ángel Valente, Antonio Gamoneda, Pere Gimferrer, Julián Ríos and others, he is part of the generation of writers who revived democratic Spain.

He was elected to Seat H of the Real Academia Española on 18 June 2015; he took up his seat on 13 March 2016.
