= Mario Satz =

Spanish writer and poet

Mario Satz is a Spanish language writer and poet. He was born Mario Norberto Satz Tetelbaum in 1944, in Coronel Pringles in Buenos Aires Province, Argentina.

After secondary school, Satz travelled widely. He studied Middle East history and anthropology, the Bible, and Kabbalah while living in Jerusalem from 1970 to 1973. In 1977, he received a grant to study the works of Giovanni Pico della Mirandola while living in Florence. He became a Spanish citizen in 1978, and lives in Barcelona.

== Selected works ==
- Azahar. Taurus. 1996. ISBN 978-84-306-0045-8.
- Tres cuentos españoles. Sirmio. 1988. ISBN 978-84-7769-006-1.
