= Vicente Antonio García de la Huerta =

Spanish writer (1734–1787)

The Most Excellent Vicente García de la Huerta
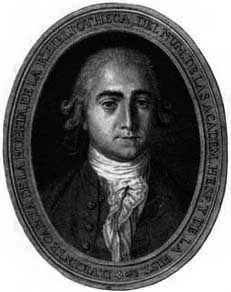
- Born: Vicente Antonio García de la Huerta; 9 March 1734; Zafra (Badajoz), Spain
- Died: 12 March 1787 (aged 53); Madrid, Spain

Seat N of the Real Academia Española
- In office 20 May 1760 – 12 March 1787
- Preceded by: José de Rada y Aguirre
- Succeeded by: Pío Ignacio Lamo

Vicente Antonio García de la Huerta (9 March 1734, in Zafra – 12 March 1787, in Madrid) was a Spanish dramatist, educated at Salamanca. At Madrid he soon attracted attention by his literary arrogance and handsome person, and at an early age became chief of the National Library, a post from which he was dismissed owing to the intrigues of his numerous enemies. The publication of his unsatisfactory collection of Spanish plays entitled Theatro Hespañol (1785–1786) exposed him to severe censures, which appear to have affected his reason.

He died at Madrid, without carrying into effect his avowed intention of reviving the national drama. His Agamemnon vengado derives from Sophocles, his faire is translated from Voltaire, and even his once famous Raquel, though Spanish in subject, is classic in form.
