= Ramón de Campoamor y Campoosorio =

Spanish poet

Ramón de Campoamor
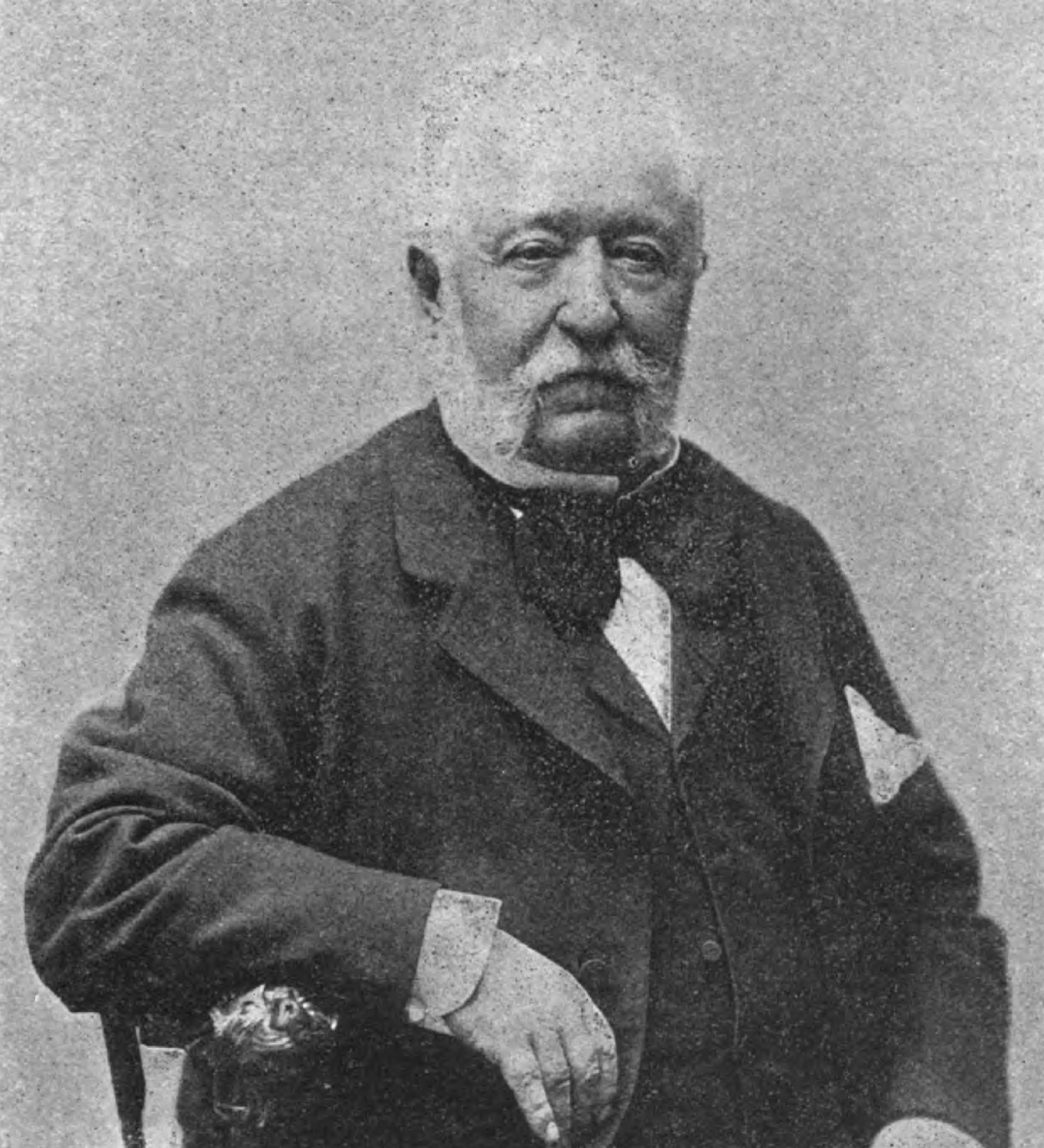
- Born: Ramón María de las Mercedes Pérez de Campoamor y Campoosorio; 24 September 1817; Navia, Spain
- Died: 11 February 1901 (aged 83); Madrid, Spain
- Writing career
- Language: Spanish
- Genre: Poetry

Seat E of the Real Academia Española
- In office 9 March 1862 – 11 February 1901
- Preceded by: José del Castillo y Ayensa
- Succeeded by: José Ortega Munilla

Ramón María de las Mercedes Pérez de Campoamor y Campoosorio (September 24, 1817 – February 11, 1901), known as Ramón de Campoamor, was a Spanish realist poet and philosopher.

== Life ==
He was born at Navia (Asturias) on September 24, 1817.

Abandoning his first intention of entering the Jesuit order, he studied medicine at Madrid, found an opening in politics as a supporter of the Moderate party, and, after occupying several subordinate posts, became governor of Castellón de la Plana, of Alicante and of Valencia. Campoamor identified with the moderate liberalism of his day, repudiating both revolution and reaction equally.

His first appearance as a poet dated from 1840, when the Madrid Lyceum of Art and Literature published his Ternezas y flores, a collection of idyllic verses, remarkable for their technical excellence. His Ayes del Alma (1842) and his Fábulas morales y politicas (1842) sustained his reputation, but showed no perceptible increase of power or skill. An epic poem in sixteen cantos, Colón (1853), is no more successful than modern epics usually are.

Campoamor's theatrical pieces, such as El Palacio de la Verdad (1871), Dies Irae (1873), El Honor (1874) and Glorias Humanas (1885), are interesting experiments; but they are totally lacking in dramatic spirit. He always showed a keen interest in metaphysical and philosophic questions, and defined his position in La Filosofia de las leyes (1846), El personalismo, apuntes para una filosofía (1855), La metafísica limpia, fija y da esplendor al lenguaje (1862), Lo Absoluto (1865) and El Ideísmo (1883). These studies are chiefly valuable as embodying fragments of self-revelation, and as having led to the composition of those doloras, humoradas and pequenos poemas, which the poet's admirers consider as a new poetic species. The first collection of Doloras was printed in 1846, and from that date onwards new specimens were added to each succeeding edition. It is difficult to define a dolora. One critic has described it as a didactic, symbolic stanza which combines the lightness and grace of the epigram, the melancholy of the endecha, the concise narrative of the ballad, and the philosophic intention of the apologue.

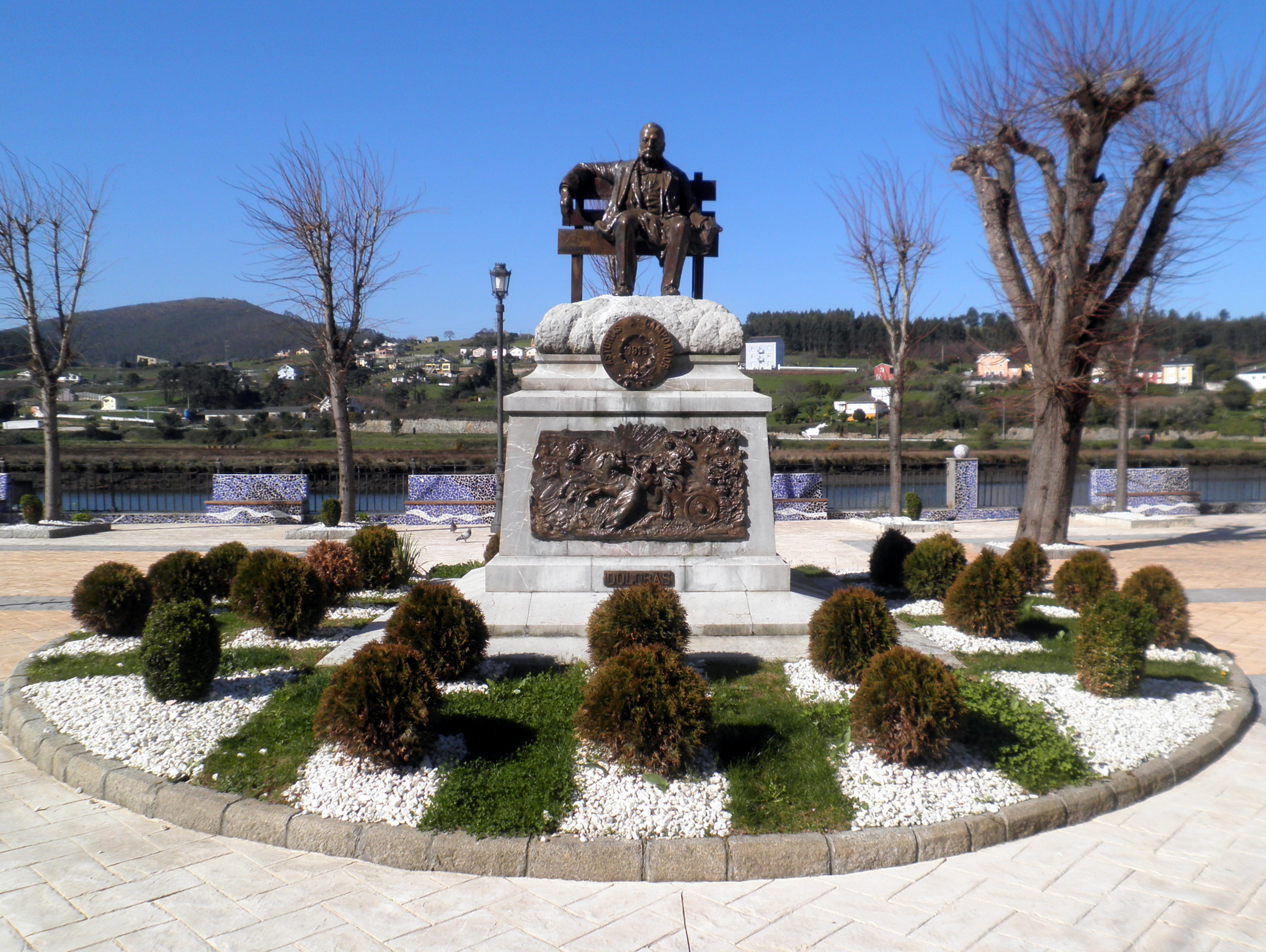
Statue of Ramón de Campoamor y Campoosorio in Navia in Asturias

The poet himself declared that a dolora is a "dramatic humorada", and that a "pequeño poema" is a dolora on a larger scale. These definitions are unsatisfactory. The humoristic, philosophic epigram is an ancient poetic form to which Campoamor has given a new name; his invention goes no further. It cannot be denied that in the Doloras Campoamor's special gifts of irony, grace and pathos find their best expression. Taking a commonplace theme, he presents in four, eight or twelve lines a perfect miniature of condensed emotion. By his choice of a vehicle he has avoided the fatal facility and copiousness which have led many Spanish poets to destruction. It pleased him to affect a vein of melancholy, and this affectation has been reproduced by his followers.

He died at Madrid on February 12, 1901.
