= Trafalgar =

Trafalgar most often refers to:

- The Battle of Trafalgar (1805), fought near Cape Trafalgar, Spain
- Trafalgar Square, a public space and tourist attraction in London, England

Trafalgar may also refer to:

== Places ==
- Cape Trafalgar, a headland in Cádiz, Spain
- Trafalgar, the British Shipping Forecast's sea region surrounding Cape Trafalgar
- Trafalgar, Indiana, a town in the United States
- Trafalgar Township, a former municipality in Ontario, Canada
- Trafalgar Moraine, in Oakville, Ontario, Canada
- Trafalgar, Nova Scotia, Canada, a community within the Municipality of the District of St. Mary's, Guysborough County
- Trafalgar, Victoria, a town in Gippsland, Victoria, Australia
- Trafalgar, Dominica, a village and waterfall in the St. George province of the Commonwealth of Dominica, West Indies
- Trafalgar, KwaZulu-Natal, a seaside village in South Africa
- Trafalgar, Hougang, a subzone of the town of Hougang located in north eastern Singapore
- Trafalgar (Madrid), a ward of Chamberi district, Madrid, Spain

== Companies ==
- Trafalgar Tours, a British tour company
- Trafalgar Group, an American polling company

== Transportation ==
- Trafalgar, a GWR 3031 Class locomotive
- Trafalgar railway station, in Australia

== Vessels ==
- Trafalgar-class submarines of the Royal Navy
- HMS Trafalgar, any of several British Navy ships

== Other uses ==
- Trafalgar (album), by the Bee Gees
- Trafalgar (novel), by Spanish author Benito Pérez Galdós
- Trafalgar D. Water Law, a character in the manga One Piece

== See also ==
- The Battle of Trafalgar (disambiguation)
- Trafalgar School (disambiguation)
- Trafalgar Square (disambiguation)
