= Spanish Realist literature =

Historical genre of Spanish literature

Spanish Realist literature is the literature written in Spain during the second half of the 19th century, following the Realist movement which predominated in Europe.

In the mid-19th century, the Romantic movement waned and a new literary movement arose in Europe: Realism. This new approach grew out of the 1850 French reaction to selected aspects of Romanticism, mainly costumbrismo. As artistic style rebelled against "art for art's sake" and literary imagination grew tired of fanciful and colorful depictions, artists and authors began to focus more objectively on people, actions, and society. The main precursor was Honoré de Balzac (1799–1850), who, with works like The Human Comedy, imposed a moral and social objective on the novel. This purpose, which became the almost exclusive concern of the writers of the time, soon led to Naturalism.

The term realist was used for the first time in 1850, referring to painting, but was later adopted by literature, in which it was applied mainly to the novel. One of the reasons for the popular success of novels was their publication in newspapers in installments, conceived as a tactic to encourage the public to buy the newspaper daily. The attitude of the realistic writer is analytical and critical, and usually remains objective. The important novels of the 19th century focused on social character, leading the writers to consider themselves to be "historians of the present".

== Historical context ==
During the 19th century, Spain experienced one of the most tumultuous periods of its history. The century opened with the War of Independence against France and ended with the Spanish–American War and the "Disaster of '98"—the loss of Cuba and Puerto Rico in America and the Philippines in Asia. The Borbón (Bourbon) dynasty, after the reigns of Fernando VII (1814–1833) and Isabel II (1833–1868), was overthrown in the revolution of 1868, the Glorious Revolution. The rule of Serrano (1869–1870) and the brief reign of Amadeo de Saboya (1871–1873) followed. Later, the short era of the First Republic (1873–1874) began, followed by the Restoration of the Borbón dynasty under Alfonso XII (1874–1885), son of Isabel II, after the uprising of Martínez Campos. After the death of Alfonso XII, his second wife, María Cristina assumed the regency until 1902, the year in which Alfonso's son Alfonso XIII began to reign.

== Naturalism ==
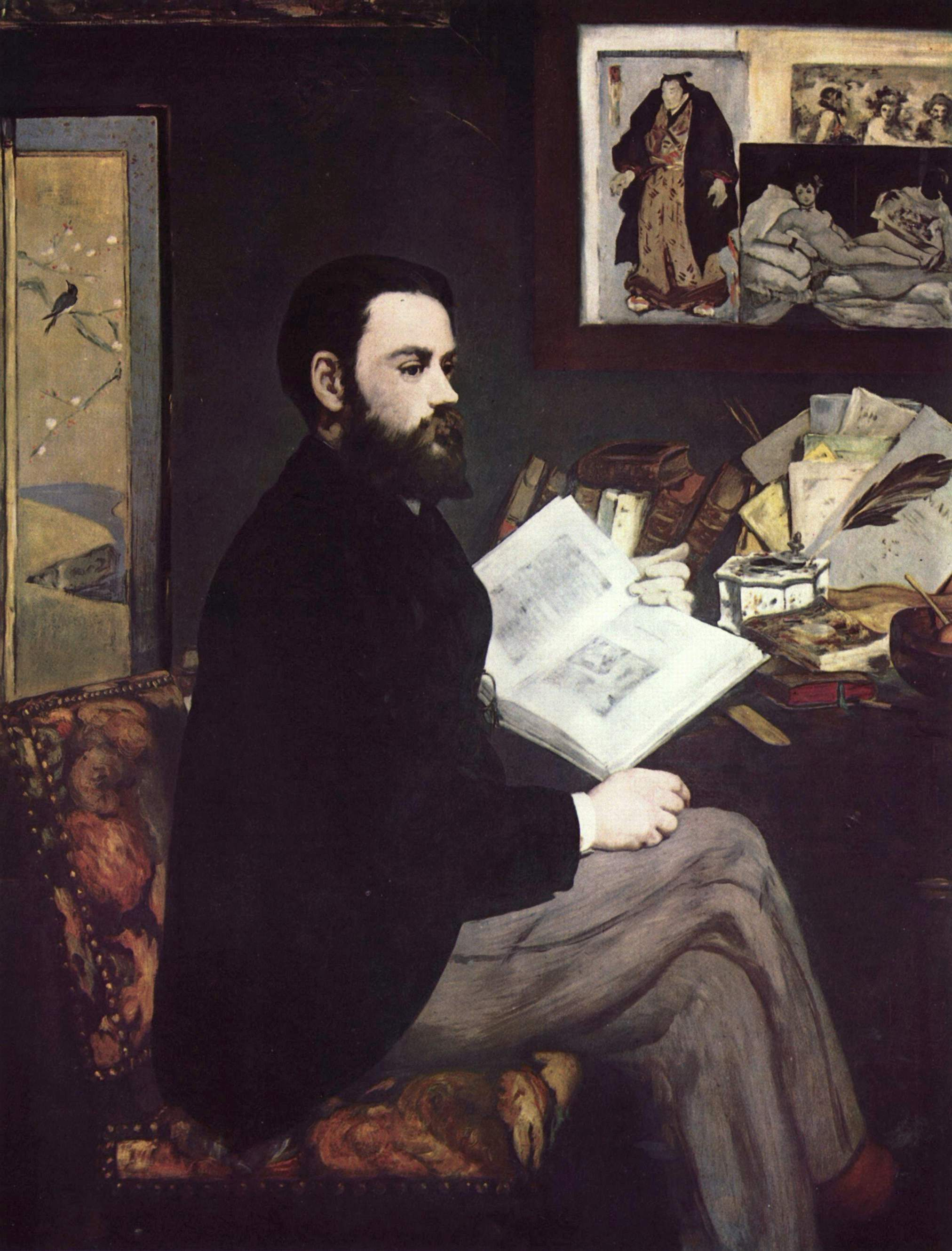
Portrait of Émile Zola (1868), by Édouard Manet

This literary movement began in France and its initiator was Émile Zola (1840–1902). This style descends from the positivist philosophy of Auguste Comte (1798–1857), the methods of the physiologist Claude Bernard (1813–1878), and many distinctive achievements of the modern spirit: democracy, experimental methods (Claude Bernard), and theories of heredity (Charles Darwin). Zola, a socialist, looks for the cause of social problems in society, and of the individual's problems in biological heredity. Thus, Naturalism adopts a materialist and determinist concept of people as not morally responsible for their actions and the situations in which they are found, because these are determined by the environment and heredity. While the realist writer is conscious of what occurs, the naturalist investigates its cause and effect. Alcoholics, the insane, and psychopaths are prevalent in Zola's works, predicated on his belief that the environment was the source of many of society's ills.

Zola introduced the naturalistic theory in The Experimental Novel (1880). In this essay on literary criticism, he maintains that the novelist is an observer and an experimenter. From the point of view of the observer, the writer offers the facts as he has seen them, and establishes the environment which the characters inhabit and where the facts are developed. From the point of view of the experimenter, the novelist "institutes the experience," moving the characters through a particular story to show that the succession of events will occur in conformity with the demands of determinism.

In Spain, the contradictions between naturalistic theories and religious beliefs reduced Naturalism's manifestation. Some critics even wondered whether Naturalism in the strictest sense ever occurred in Spain. Emilia Pardo Bazán, commonly considered to be naturalist, addresses Naturalism's reception in Spain in her 1883 article La cuestión palpitante (The Burning Question). Additionally, passages of texts by authors such as Benito Pérez Galdós have been considered naturalistic, but that has been explicitly rejected by the majority of literary critics. The line between Spanish Naturalism and Realism is difficult to distinguish due to the infrequent adoption of explicit theories among Spanish artists.

== Characteristics of Realism ==
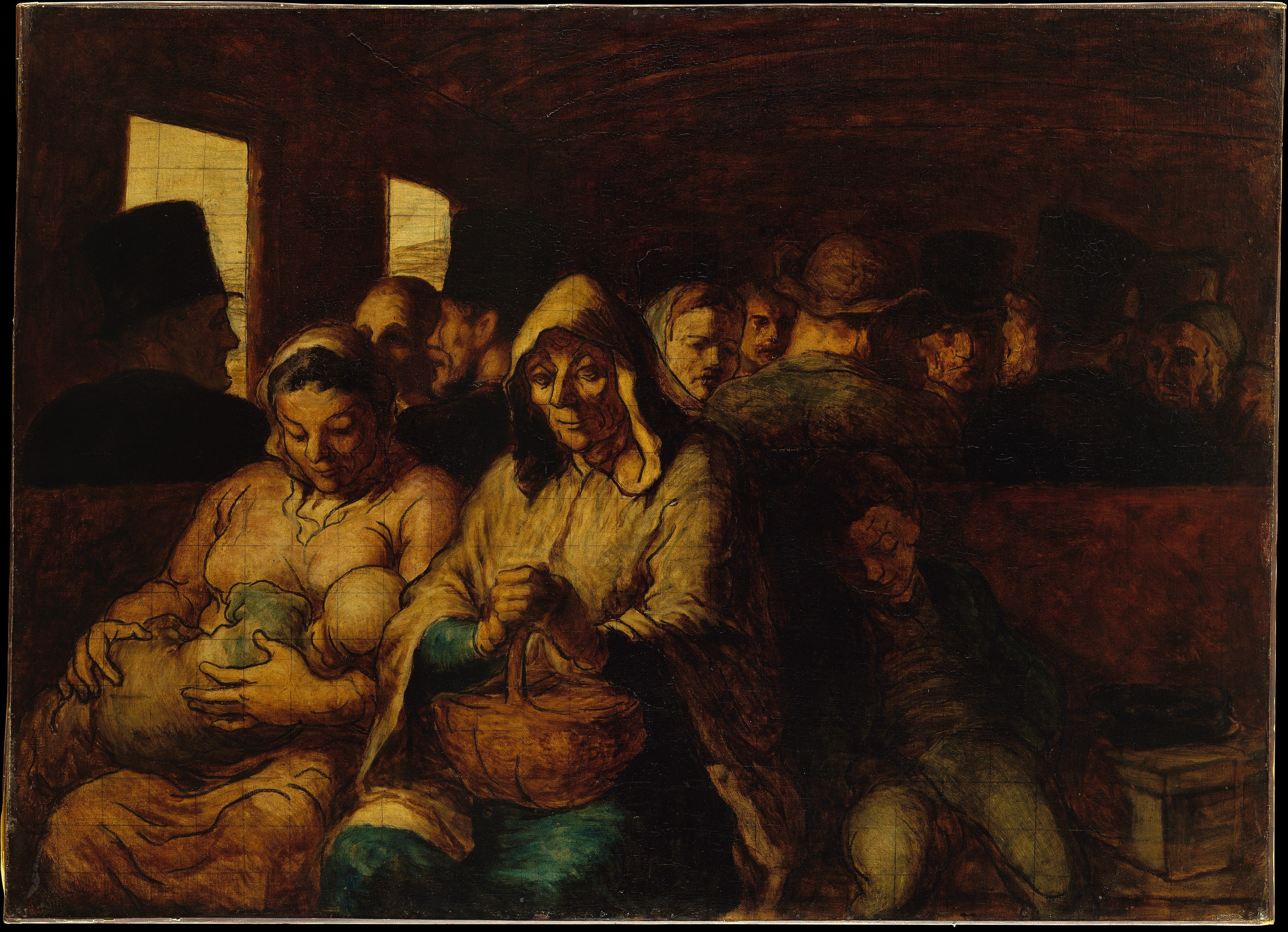
The Third-Class Wagon (1864), by realist painter Honoré Daumier

In Spain, the best literary fruit of the second half of the 19th century was the novel, a consequence of the international blossoming of the genre as an expression of the middle class's rising political power, obtained through successive revolutions (1789, 1820, 1830, 1848). The values and inquietudes of the middle-class are reflected in the mirror of Realist literature: individualism, materialism, desire for social ascent, and esteem of daily and immutable things.

The fundamental themes of literary Realism are the contrast between traditional farming values and modern urban values, the exodus from the field to the city and inherent social and moral contrasts, the fight for social ascent and moral and economic success, women's dissatisfaction with restrictions against their working outside of the home, and middle-class independence and individualism. The themes of adultery and folletinesque and sentimental fantasy appear, as ways to escape the relentless Realism of the era. There are two main tendencies in Realism: the progressive and the conservative.

The Realist novel of this period is characterized by:

- Objective vision of reality through direct observation of customs or psychological characters, eliminating subjective aspects and fantastic events. According to Galdós and Clarín respectively, "The novel is the image of life," as well as "an artistic copy of reality."
- Defense of a thesis: the narrators write their works focusing reality through their moral conception, using an omniscient narrator. The defense of a thesis usually compromises the objectivity of the novel.
- Themes relevant to the reader, such as marital conflicts, infidelity, and defense of ideals.
- Colloquial and popular language, which acquire great importance because they locate characters firmly in the environment reflected in the text.

== Realism and Naturalism in Spain ==
In Spain, Realism installed itself with extreme facility, since a precedent in picaresque novels already existed. Furthermore, relevant themes were extant in that cornerstone of Spanish and world literature, Miguel de Cervantes' Don Quixote. Realism reached its maximum splendor in the second half of the 19th century with authors such as Juan Valera, José María de Pereda, and Benito Pérez Galdós, although it never established a canon as rigorous as that produced by the school of Balzac.

- In the work of Galdós, and later in that of Clarín, Pardo Bazán, and Blasco Ibáñez, clear naturalistic influences exist, but without the scientific and experimental foundations that Émile Zola sought to imprint in his Realist works. They do share a spirit of subversiveness and struggle in the face of conservative ideology.
- The Realist novel generally reflects regional settings. For example, Pereda's novels take place in Cantabria, Juan Valera's in Andalusia, and Clarín's in Asturias. Benito Perez Galdós's tendency to set his stories in Madrid, an urban environment, is a notable exception.

Naturalism in Spain, as it did in France, also had its detractors, sometimes provoking great controversies. Naturalist Pedro Antonio de Alarcón carried on a fierce rivalry with José María de Pereda who, impassioned, once described Realism as immoral. The movement's most exalted and ardent defenders were Benito Perez Galdós and Emilia Pardo Bazán, who provoked one of the most furious conflicts with her 1883 publication of La cuestión palpitante ("The Throbbing Question").

== The novel: main authors ==
=== Juan Valera ===
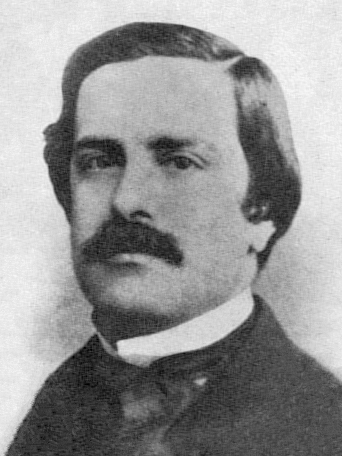
Juan Valera

Juan Valera y Alcalá-Galiano (Cabra, Córdoba, October 1824 – Madrid, April 1905) belonged to an aristocratic family. He carried out diplomatic missions in several countries and held important political positions. His career as a novelist began when he was around fifty years old. In his last years he was victim of progressive blindness.

From his beginnings, Valera was opposed to Romanticism, because of its extremism, as much as he was to Realism, because they prevented him from totally realizing his vision. He only adopted a realist position when he chose real settings (like his native Andalusia) and lifelike characters, although he rejected the less attractive aspects of reality, which ran contrary to the credo of the naturalists and some realists.

His importance is due to his novels; the first of them is Pepita Jiménez (1874), mostly written in epistolary form. In this work, the story of a widow is told. The widow agrees with a father that his son should be taken away from town to keep him away from her and to allow him to pursue his aspiration to the priesthood. Other important works are Doña Luz (which deals with questions of religious vocation) and Juanita la Larga. This third novel recounts the idyll of Don Paco, a fiftyish man, with the protagonist, who wishes to redeem herself through an honest marriage.

Juan Valera was a liberal politician and a religious skeptic. He used a simple, although non-vulgar, literary language. When he died, the writers of the Generation of the 98 retained a deep respect for him. Today he is considered by many critics as the best Spanish prose writer of the 19th century, while recognizing the creative superiority of Galdós.

=== José María de Pereda ===
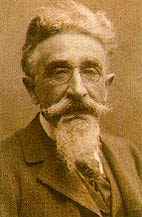
José María de Pereda

José María de Pereda was born in Polanco (province of Santander, present-day Cantabria) in 1833. He belonged to an Hidalgo family, he traveled widely abroad, and he was a Carlist deputy, although later he dedicated himself to the cultivation of his lands and to literature. He maintained a friendship with Galdós, despite their opposing political ideologies. He died in 1906 in his home town.

He began his literary production as a costumbrista: inclined to realism with aspects of impressionism, he published Escenas montañosas ("Mountainous scenes"). Later, he would find his ideal formula for the novel, imbuing that costumbrism with a vision which conveyed his love for the landscape and the people of the mountains, with their passions and their characteristic language. In his first novels of this type ("idyllic novel"), he depicted the peacefulness and ignorance of rustic people confronting the political machinations of modern life (Don Gonzalo de la Gonzalera and De tal palo tal astilla). He defended a thesis that nowadays few would accept: like father, like son. The novel ends as Pereda decides to abandon the explicit defense of any argument. Stories like Sotileza (epic of Cantabrian fishermen) and La puchera belong to this second period. The one that is considered his masterpiece is Peñas arriba (1895), whose descriptive bucolic style and casticismo seem antiquated today. In spite of that, José María de Pereda is considered a great narrator, possessed of great descriptive and epic capacity.

=== Pedro Antonio de Alarcón ===
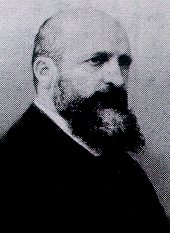
Pedro Antonio de Alarcón

Pedro Antonio de Alarcón was born in Guadix (Granada) in 1833. He was one of the authors principally responsible for the domination of realism over romantic prose at that time. He was a politician as well as a writer, and his ideology evolved from liberal positions to more traditional ones.

He participated in the Spanish–Moroccan War as a volunteer and he left written testimony of his experience inDiario de un testigo de la Guerra de África (Diary of a Witness to the African War). For a time he was a travel writer, relating several of his trips in his articles. His religious novels stood out among his other writings, the most popular of all being The Scandal (El escándalo), written in 1875; in this novel he defended the Jesuits, which was very controversial. His most popular work, and the one by which he is remembered, is The Three-Cornered Hat (El sombrero de tres picos), published in 1874, that would inspire Manuel de Falla to write his famous ballet of the same name.

=== Benito Perez Galdós ===
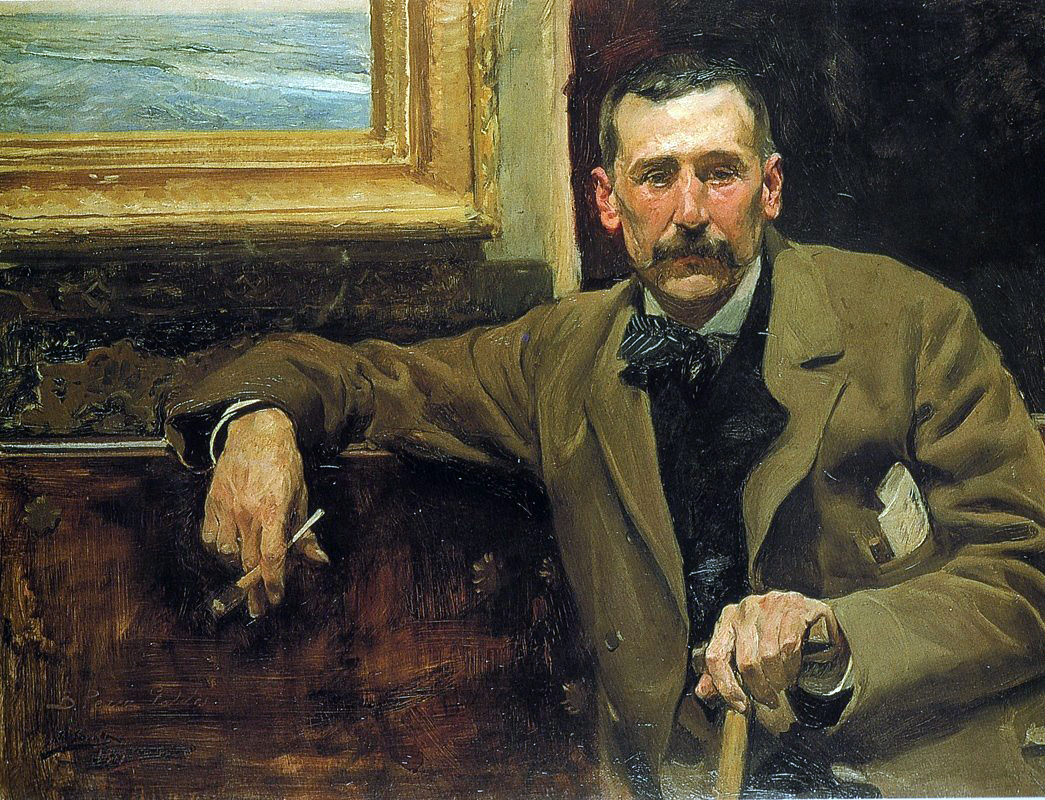
Portrait of Benito Pérez Galdós, by Joaquín Sorolla

Galdós is considered to be the most representative writer of the movement. He was born in Las Palmas de Gran Canaria in 1843. He studied law in Madrid. He later lived in Paris, where he was intrigued by the novels of Honoré de Balzac, a strong influence on his later work. He declared himself to be progressive and anticlerical, but this did not prevent him from forging close friendships with Menéndez y Pelayo and José María de Pereda, of opposite ideologies. Although he defined himself as a republican, little by little his radicalism tempered, and he maintained a personal friendship with Alfonso XIII. In 1910 he began to lose his eyesight, and the expenses of his numerous paramours brought him to near-ruin. The Spanish government sought the Nobel Prize for him, but was opposed by a significant portion of the Spanish populace, including the Real Academia and the leadership of the Catholic Church. He died, blind, in 1920.

==== The National Episodes ====
Among the prolific works of Galdós are the Episodios Nacionales (National Episodes), a sprawling opus of 46 volumes in five distinct series. They depict a broad representation of contemporary Spanish history between the War of Independence and the Restoration, which serve as a backdrop for his stories.

The first series, written between 1873 and 1875, includes the episodes of Trafalgar, Bailén, Zaragoza and Gerona. In almost all of them, the protagonist is Gabriel Araceli, a young man who lives during the climax of the War of Independence. Later series include volumes such as Equipaje del Rey José (The Luggage of King José); Los cien mil hijos de San Luis (The One Hundred Thousand Children of San Luis); Zumalacárregui, about the First Carlist War; and Prim (The One of the Sad Destinies), a book about Isabel II. The last series depicted events experienced by Galdós himself, but the work was unfinished and it is seldom a topic of study or discussion.

==== Novels ====
In his first epoch (1867–1878), Galdós vigorously wrote against intolerance and hypocrisy. His novels feature young male protagonists who confront the hostile atmosphere of provincial cities. Ironically, his writing at this time demonstrates the same narrow-mindedness that he condemns, from the opposite ideological perspective. (Doña Perfecta, Gloria, La Familia de León Roch). Marianela, one of his more prominent novels of the first epoch, is the story of a tragic relationship between a blind man and an ignorant, ugly girl. The girl flees when her loved one recovers his sight, afraid to show her face to him; she dies, heartbroken, when he marries another woman.

Later, between 1881 and 1915, he published 24 novels, which represent a "human comedy" of the daily life of Madrid. They maintained progressive, but less provocative, themes. These books focus on the Spanish middle class, portrayed with precision and a certain melancholy. Significant works of this group include La de Bringas (The Bringas Woman), about social climbing; Fortunata y Jacinta, his most important work; Miau, a dramatic vision of the bureaucracy of the time; Torquemada en la Hoguera (Torquemada in the Inferno), a study of greed and avarice; Misericordia (Compassion), with people of less-refined upbringing.

==== Plays ====
Late in life, Pérez Galdós began a career as a dramatic playwright. His most notable plays include La Loca de la Casa (The Crazy Woman of the House), Hija de San Quintin (The Daughter of San Quintín), Electra (whose opening sparked a riot) and El Abuelo (The Grandfather), which was adapted into a 1998 film by José Luis Garci. Galdós's theater works are characterized by sincerity and non-conformism; although contemporary at the time they were written, some of his theater works sound dated by current standards.

==== Importance of Galdós ====
The impact of the National Episodes and many of his novels and plays was significant. Critics and writers of his time considered him to be a genius, although his outspoken views on religion, social policies and politics stimulated strong opposition from political and religious authority figures. The Generation of '98 were strongly influenced by his writing, although they rebelled against his "chabacanería" or perceived vulgarity; Ramón del Valle-Inclán, for example, nicknamed him "Don Benito el garbancero" or the chick-pea man. However, it can be argued that the only vulgarity was found in the lives that he described.

=== Emilia Pardo Bazán ===
Emilia Pardo Bazán was born in A Coruña in 1851. Only child of the Count and Countess of Pardo Bazán, she got married at age seventeen and she settled in Madrid. She was a woman of great culture, she took many trips abroad, and an endowed chair in the Department of Literature at the University of Madrid was created for her. She died in Madrid in 1921.

==== Work ====
Among her studies on contemporary literature, La cuestión palpitante (The Burning Question) stands out, and although she does not accept naturalism in this work, she defends a realist point of view and confronts those who maintain that the only purpose of evil in literature is to defeat it.

Her style was energetic and she profoundly explored difficult social problems. Her most important works were novels such as Un viaje de novios (A Honeymoon), which narrates the story of a marriage between a mature man and a young, uncultured, but wealthy woman; or The tribune, the most naturalist of her novels, where she describes the hard proletarian life in a tobacco factory. Of greatest importance to her reputation are Los pazos de Ulloa (The House of Ulloa) and its sequel La madre naturaleza (Mother Nature), with Galician characters and landscapes, with fast-moving and sometimes violent plots.

=== Luis Coloma ===
Luis Coloma (Jerez de la Frontera, January 1851 - Madrid, 1914) was the son of a famous doctor. At twelve years old he entered the preparatory Naval academy of San Fernando (1863), but later left and received a master's degree in Law from the University of Seville, although he never got to practice law. He became a member of the Real Academia in 1908 and he died in 1914.

He promoted literature and had a popular following. He wrote two important novels: Pequeñeces (Trivialities) and Boy. In the first he pens a critique of the high Madrid society in the years previous to the Bourbon Restoration) in the figure of Alfonso XII, son of the overthrown Isabel II. Later in life he only published writings of a historical nature, like Jeromín, on Don Juan de Austria.

=== Leopoldo Alas (Clarín) ===
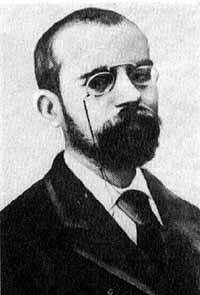
Leopoldo Alas "Clarín"

Leopoldo Alas was born in Zamora in 1852, although he always felt deeply Asturian. He completed his study of law in Oviedo. He then obtained his doctorate in Madrid, where he lost faith in God. From then on he would live in permanent spiritual conflict, which is evident in his work. At the age of twenty-three, he began to use the pseudonym Clarín in his work. As a professor at the University of Oviedo in 1883, he defended republican ideas, but soon tired of politics. In 1892, a crisis of conscience renewed his faith in God, although he would not adhere to the extremes of Catholic orthodoxy. He died in Oviedo in 1901.

==== Work ====
Clarín had great prestige as a literary critic. His articles demonstrate his great knowledge and sound judgment (expressed on many occasions through scathing sarcasm). His articles, which made him a feared authority in the Spanish literary panorama, were compiled in volumes such as Solos de Clarín and Paliques.

He also wrote short stories and novellas; he published more than seventy short works. Among the first short stories that he composed, Pipá (1879), which tells of the misfortunes of a picaresque figure from Oviedo, stands out. Also notable is Adiós, Cordera, a classic dramatic idyll.

But his reputation as a novelist is exemplified by the only two novels he wrote, La Regenta and Su único hijo; the former is more significant. With clear influences from Madame Bovary by Flaubert, it physically and morally depicts Vetusta (which was modeled on his hometown of Oviedo) as a prototypical Spanish city steeped in tradition. Alas employed naturalistic techniques, but he did not paint squalid environs as did Zola; instead, what predominates is a sense of pessimism, tempered by touches of tenderness and irony. In La Regenta individuals find themselves in conflict with their own consciences (particularly its protagonist Ana Ozores, whose character is similar to Emma Bovary, except that she comes across as more sympathetic and less conniving). Characters find themselves conflicted by duty and desire. Clarín's portrayal of the city was considered insulting by many. The novel was quickly condemned by the Church, although with the passage of time, Clarín and the bishop of Oviedo established a firm friendship. Today La Regenta is considered to be an exemplar of Spanish Realism, in the same class as Fortunata y Jacinta by Galdós.

=== Armando Palacio Valdés ===
Armando Palacio Valdés (Entralgo, Asturias, 1853 – Madrid, 1938) was educated in Avilés and finished his baccalaureate in Oviedo; he pursued a career as an attorney in Madrid. He was editor of Revista Europea, where he published articles which he soon after compiled in Semblanzas literarias (1871). In 1885 he published the novel José, a realistic picture of the customs and manners of seafaring folk. After the death of José María de Pereda in 1905, Palacio Valdés assumed Pereda's position in the Real Academia Española.

Palacio Valdés was a good friend of Clarín. He wrote several important novels, among them Marta y María, in which the two Biblical sisters are transported to a contemporary setting and fight against the false mysticism of the time. The most popular of his works is La monja de San Sulpicio (The Nun from San Sulpicio), in which he narrates the adventures that precede the marriage of a Galician doctor with the protagonist, a nun without vocation who does not renew her vows. Also notable is El pueblo perdido (The Lost Village), a dramatic history of a town ruined by mining.

=== Vicente Blasco Ibáñez ===
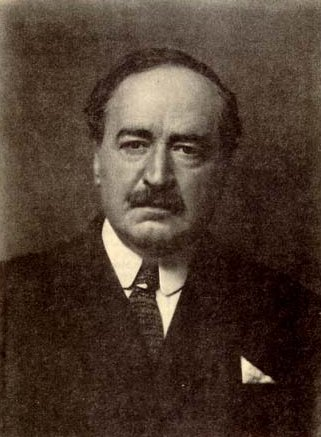
Vicente Blasco Ibáñez

Vicente Blasco Ibáñez was born in Valencia in 1867. He harbored radical republican ideas for which he was repeatedly arrested and finally exiled. He was a deputy during seven sessions of the national legislature. In 1909 he left for Argentina in search of fortune, but his attempt failed. He supported the Allies during World War I (1914–1918); with the war as backdrop, he wrote Los cuatro jinetes del apocalipsis (The Four Horsemen of the Apocalypse), a novel of great worldwide success. He led the life of a cosmopolitan millionaire and many of his stories were adapted for Hollywood. He died in 1928 in Menton, Côte d'Azur, France. His remains were transferred to Valencia in 1933, where they were received triumphantly.

Blasco produced an enormous number of novels. Works set in Valencia, so intensely loved by the writer, stand out. Among these are Arroz y tartana (Rice and Carriage), La barraca (The Farmhouse), Entre naranjos (Among Orange Trees), Cañas y barro (Canes and Clay). He reflected his political, social and anti-religious ideas in La catedral) (The Cathedral) or La bodega (The Warehouse), although his fame is due to a great extent to Los cuatro jinetes del apocalipsis, a work which deals with family dramas during the Great War.

Valencian works of Blasco are preferred by critics. He has been compared with Émile Zola because he shares with the French novelist a subversive attitude, a predilection for squalid environs, and a preoccupation with biological inheritance. He writes intensely and his style can be described as coarse, although it does not lack images of purity. Although a contemporary of the Generation of '98, his worldly spirit differs from the asceticism and the culture of those writers.

== Poetry ==
While it is true that towards the second half of the 19th century the novel evolved quickly towards Realism, this did not happen to poetry and to drama, whose transformation was less violent and still continued to be infused with Romanticism until the end of the century.

This late Romanticism is more apparent than real; sometimes it lacks depth and the lyric exaltation to which the true romantic abandoned himself. This is due to the social reality of the moment: the time in which the bourgeoisie would consolidate the Restoration of 1875. This society, which was laying the foundations of Capitalism and was taking the first steps of industrialization in the country, did not leave room for the people who admired art for art's sake.

The most representative writers are Gaspar Núñez de Arce and Ramón de Campoamor, sometimes considered as opponents of Romanticism, because Romanticism was still in its final throes as is evidenced in the classic works of Gustavo Adolfo Bécquer and Rosalía de Castro.

=== Ramón de Campoamor ===
Ramón de Campoamor was born in Navia, Asturias, in 1817, and died in 1901. He belonged to the Moderate Party, and was an employee of the Treasury, governor of three Spanish provinces and a deputy in Parliament. He wrote treatises on philosophical subjects (El absoluto), dramatic plays, and poems of epic and philosophical pretensions (Colón, El drama universal and El licenciado Torralba).

Nevertheless, his most personal creations are his small poems, like Humoradas, Doloras and Small poems. With them he tried to break with Romanticism, creating a poetry in accordance with the moment: prosaic, simple, skeptical and in some cases ironic, with a moral that is usually trivial. Today it is considered to be simple by scholars. Campoamor explained his innovative ideas in Poética, where he says:

Poetry is the rhythmic representation of a thought by means of an image, and expressed in a language that can be said in prose neither with more naturalness nor with fewer words... Only rhythm should separate the language of verse from the typical one of prose... Given my antipathy toward art for art's sake and the special language of Classicism, it has been my consistent effort to arrive at art by idea and to express this in the common language, revolutionizing the basis for and the look of poetry.

=== Gaspar Núñez de Arce ===
Gaspar Núñez de Arce (1834–1903) was born in Valladolid. He was governor of Logroño, parliamentary deputy, senator of the Cortes, and foreign minister.

He wrote dramas, such as El haz de leña (The bundle of firewood), that deals with the theme of the prince Don Carlos, son of Philip II, a subject already treated by Schiller. He excelled in the field of poetry, where he was a prolific writer.

Núñez de Arce was a careful poet, yet his poems are loaded with political artifice (as in Gritos del cobate (Combat Cries), where he endeavored to create a civic and patriotic poetry) in exalted speeches of philosophical musings (La duda, English: Doubt). He is also often accused of using rhetoric that is too facile. He also wrote stories or legends in verse, like Un idilio (An iIdyll), La pesca (Fishing) and El vértigo (Vertigo).

=== Other poets ===
Although less important, there were also other poets who followed realism, among them:

- Ventura Ruiz Aguilera (1820–1881): Born in Salamanca and author of Ecos nacionales (National Echoes), patriotic legends, and Elegías (Elegies).
- Vicente Wenceslao Querol (1836–1889): Native of Valencia, author of Rimas (Rhymes).
- Federico Balart (1831–1905): wrote Dolores , a collection of elegies written about the death of his wife.
- Emilio Ferrari (1850–1907): from Valladolid, imitated Núñez de Arce.
- José Velarde (1849–1892): as Emilio Ferrari, also followed in the footsteps of Núñez de Arce.
- Manuel Reina (1856–1905): imbued his poems with the color of his native Andalusia.
- Joaquín Bartrina (1850–1880): Born in Barcelona, he took the humor and the ordinariness of Ramón de Campoamor to the extreme, to which he added a materialistic pessimism, in his work Algo (Something).

== The theater ==
The Spanish Realist theater contains a wide spectrum of works, from the most conservative and non-critical positions to the most progressive and acid ones: from the high comedy of Adelardo López de Ayala and Ventura de la Vega, to the ethically overwrought theater of Benito Pérez Galdós and the sharp critique of Enrique Gaspar. Apart from these authors, the interest in costumbrismo reflected the most conservative mores of the bourgeois public. Costumbrismo had a new beginning, through genres like the zarzuela or género chico, the sainete or "theater by the hour". It was fundamentally a theater of middle class evasion of social problems, avoiding the creation of crises of conscience for the bourgeoisie. Alongside this, it tried to revitalize the old fashioned conservative value of honor through initiatives to revive romantic historical drama. These are exemplified by the works of Manuel Tamayo y Baus and by the Neo-Romanticism of the mathematician José Echegaray.

=== José Echegaray ===
José Echegaray (1832–1916) was born in Madrid and occupied high political positions. He was a civil engineer, as well as a director of a civil engineering school. He alternated the study of mathematical and scientific problems (on which he published two books: Ciencia popular (Popular Science) and Vulgarización científico (Scientific Vulgarization) with his production of dramatic poetry, which, according to Lázaro Carreter, "gives him a certain systematic bluntness that shows poetic effort more than poetic instinct". In 1904 the Nobel Prize was granted to him, along with Frédéric Mistral of Provence.

Echegaray tried to combine two incompatible elements: an exaggerated romanticism with the latent positivism and realism of his time. This results in a theater of contemporary custom, using the Romantic method, in which, according to critics, he goes too far in his use of tragic and pathetic situations. Crises of conscience and ideological problems predominate as themes in his work. Un conflicto entre los deberes (Conflict of Interest) exemplifies these themes. Among his most outstanding works are: El loco dios (The Crazy God), La mancha que limpia (The Stain That Cleans), El gran Galeoto (The Great Galeoto), and O locura, o santidad (Either Madness or Sanctity).

=== Manuel Tamayo y Baus ===
Manuel Tamayo y Baus (1829–1898) was born in Madrid. He was the son of actors and he married the daughter of the famous actor Isidoro Máiquez. He was in permanent contact with the theater and he covered a great variety of subjects in his works. He wrote classic tragedies (Virginia), romantic dramas (La locura del amor, in English The Madness of Love, about Juana la Loca), Costumbrista theater (La bola de nieve, in English The Snowball and Lo positivo, in English The Positive) and social theater (Incidentes de honor, in English Incidents of Honor and Los hombres buenos, in English The Good Men). His most important work is Un drama nuevo (A New Drama), in which he showcases the theater company of Shakespeare, which is to represent a drama that unintentionally mirrors the reality of the actors' lives. Yorick discovers through jealous fellow actor Walton that Alicia, who plays the role of unfaithful wife in the work, is unfaithful to him in reality as well. In his quest for revenge, Walton is determined to let Yorick know that Alicia loves Edmundo and, when he opportunely gets the evidence he needs, he substitutes Edmundo's letter to Alicia for the prop letter and presents it to Yorick during the performance. At this point Yorick is enmeshed in both the play he is presenting and the drama of his own discovery and kills Edmundo on stage before the audience. Finally Shakespeare explains to the audience what has happened: the play cannot go on because Yorick got so involved in his stage role that he killed his rival. Shakespeare also reveals, without implicating himself, that Walton is dead as well, having been found stabbed outside on the street.

=== Other dramatists ===
In addition to the mentioned ones, also the following stand out:

- Adelardo López de Ayala (1828–1865): He occupied high political positions (Minister and President of the Congress). He developed high comedy with works like El tanto por ciento (The Percentage), El tejado de vidrio (The Glass Tile Roof), Consolación (Consolation) and El nuevo Don Juan (The New Don Juan), in which he explored moral themes.
- Eugenio Sellés (1844–1926): wrote The Gordian Knot, in which he showed the problems of marriage.
- Enrique Gaspar (1842–1902): Author of comedies like La levita (The Frock Coat), Las personas decentes (Decent People) and Las circunstancias (The Circumstances), which reflect the bourgeois atmosphere of his time.
- José Feliú y Codina (1845–1897): wrote the rural drama La Dolores (Dolores) and theater of regional customs.
- Leopoldo Cano (1844–1934): His most outstanding works are La Pasionaria (The Passion Flower) and La mariposa, (The Butterfly).

Among the librettists of zarzuelas, Marcos Zapata, Ricardo de la Vega, José López Silva and Miguel Ramos Carrión stand out; and among the authors of sainetes, Tomás Luceño and Vital Aza stand out.

== Criticism: Menéndez y Pelayo ==
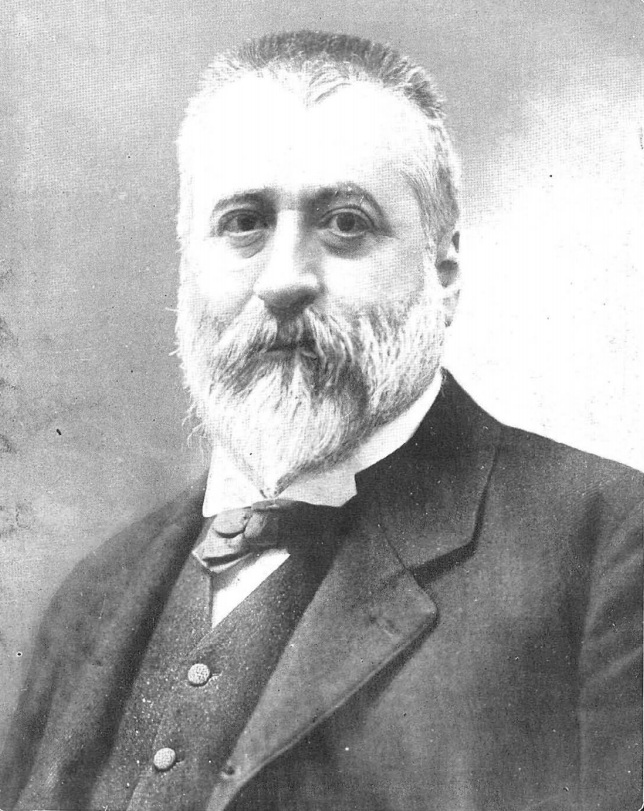
Menéndez y Pelayo

Menéndez y Pelayo was perhaps the preeminent figure of Spanish culture in the 19th century, master of the history of ideas, history, and the contemporary criticism. He was born in Santander in 1856 and he studied in several countries. When he was twenty-two years old he was awarded an endowed chair in the University of Madrid. When he was twenty-five he was appointed member of the Real Academia Española, and a little later, member of the Real Academia de Historia. He also directed the Biblioteca Nacional. When he died in 1912 he left as legacy to Santander his valuable personal library.

The work of Menéndez y Pelayo is very extensive and demonstrates a great capacity for synthesizing data. In his books his love for Spain and a passionate Catholicism are in evidence. He tried to reconstruct all the historical past of Spain, with a revisionist purpose that on several occasions placed him at the center of major controversies (for example, the one originated by his book La ciencia española (The Spanish Science). For many critics he defined the boundaries of Spanish thought in works like Historia de los heterodoxos españoles (History of the Heterodox Spaniards) and the Historia de la estética española (History of Spanish Aesthetics). With respect to literary history, he wrote works such as Las orígenes de la novela (Origins of the Novel), Antología de los poetas líricas (Anthology of Lyric Poets) (which finishes at the end of the Middle Ages), and the prologue to Obras de Lope de Vega (Works of Lope de Vega), among others.

== Feminist movement and Arenal ==
Concepción Arenal was a Spanish feminist writer and activist. She was also a pioneer and founder of the feminist movement in Spain. Concepción Arenal and her husband collaborated closely on the liberal newspaper Iberia until Fernando's death in 1859. Penniless she was forced to sell all her possessions in Armaño and moved into the house of violinist and composer Jesús de Monasterio in Potes, Cantabria, where in 1859 she founded the feminist group Conference of Saint Vincent de Paul in order to help the poor. Two years later the Academy of Moral Sciences and Politics awarded her a prize for her work "Beneficence, philanthropy and charity". It was the first time the Academy gave the prize to a woman. She also attended political and literary debates, unheard of at the time for a woman.

In later years she published poetry books and essays such as "Letters to delinquents" (1865), "Ode against slavery" (1866), "Convicts, the people and the executioner" and "The execution of the death sentence" (1867). In 1868 she was named Inspector of Women's Correctional Houses and in 1871 began fourteen years of collaboration with the Madrid-based magazine The Voice of Charity.

In 1872 she founded the Construction Beneficiary, a society dedicated to building cheap houses for workers. She also worked with the Red Cross helping the injured of the Carlist War, working in a hospital in Miranda de Ebro, later being named Secretary General of the Red Cross between 1871 and 1872. In 1877 she published Penitentiary Studies. Arenal's achievements were extraordinary in a largely traditional Spain, focusing her work on those marginalised in society. She wrote not only extensively on the state of prisons for both men and women, but also on the role of women in society in works such as La Mujer del Porvenir (1869), The education of women, The current state of women in Spain, The work of women, The woman of the house (1883) and domestic service. It is this work which made her known as the founder of the feminist movement in Spain.

== See also ==
- Realism (arts): general overview of the movement
- Literary realism: realism in international literature
- Spanish literature: evolution of Spanish literature
