= Germán Gullón =

Spanish writer (1945–2025)

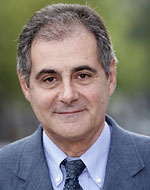
Germán Gullón

Germán Gullón (Spanish: [xerˈman ɣuˈʎon]; May 21, 1945 – June 28, 2025) was a Spanish literary critic and writer who was a professor of Spanish literature and member of the Amsterdam School for Cultural Analysis at the University of Amsterdam. He authored, besides his scholarly works and essays, two books of short stories, Adiós, Helena de Troya and Azulete, and two novels, Querida hija and La codicia de Guillermo de Orange.

== Life and career ==
Gullón's career as a university professor began after he obtained a bachelor's degree at the University of Salamanca (1969), where he wrote his MA thesis with Fernando Lázaro Carreter and studied with Ricardo Senabre and José Luis Pensado. After obtaining a PhD at the University of Texas at Austin (1970–1973), he was appointed assistant professor of Spanish at University of Pennsylvania, where he taught from 1973 to 1988. Under the chairmanship of Russell P. Sebold, and the presence of scholars like Samuel Armistead, Gonzalo Sobejano and Paul M. Lloyd, the Penn Spanish Department rose to prominence in the U.S. and became known for its faculty's ability to combine research based on philological knowledge with theoretical criticism.

At Penn Gullón obtained a Lindback Award for Distinguished Teaching, appointment as Professor of Spanish Literature, and worked for more than fifteen years as associate editor of the Hispanic Review. Later he moved on to the University of California(Davis), where he was chairman of the Department of Spanish and Classics and became a colleague of such distinguished Hispanists as Samuel Armistead and Antonio Sánchez Romeralo. He was also a visiting professor at the University of Santiago de Compostela (Literary Theory), Middlebury College (Summer, 1990) and the University Carlos III of Madrid (2000–2001).

Among the honours obtained by Gullón are an Honorary MA from the University of Pennsylvania, different scholarships, the American Philosophical Society and the Guggenheim. The Guggenheim allowed him to spend a year in Spain researching what soon would be one of his most celebrated books, La novela moderna en España. He was also the President of the International Association of Galdosistas and the Director of the Cervantes Institute in Utrecht (1997–1998).

Gullón was also member of the jury of the Premio Nadal (2000–2016) and of the Premio Ciudad de Valladolid. He was a critic for El Cultural, where he was a reviewer of British novels, European contemporary and of critical texts. Gullón himself directs the Virtual Cervantes Library portal of the Contemporary Spanish Novel (662,000 visits in May 2007).

Gullón died on June 28, 2025, at the age of 80.

== Literary critic ==
The literary criticism of Germán Gullón offers three different facets: the scholarly one, the author of literary studies, the text editor of Spanish literature of the 19th, 20th and 21st centuries, and the one as literary critic. As author of literary studies, he emphasizes his works about the 19th century and about the modernism (end of the century and Generation of '98). His contribution has been very important, within the line of formalistic works started by Ricardo Gullón, Fernando Lázaro Carreter, Francisco Rico and Darío Villanueva Prieto, because it is the one who has insisted on the importance of the way in which the works are narrated and his influence in the configuration of the meaning. Their editions have also supposed a landmark in the edition of classic Spanish moderns, for taking an original point of view. Instead of to assume since one becomes in the classic text editing that the text is one, that belongs exclusively to the author of the same, Gullón presents/displays texts published in its context, and explains how the meaning of the same goes is changing with time, that is to say, considers to the literary text like alive. Also amplify the concept of authorism, that does not reduce to the author properly, but to whatever contributes to the creation of the text, like the publisher, to the collection in which it appears, etc. Finally as literary critic it appears in El Cultural of El Mundo. His reviews always demonstrate a mixture of information, opinion and literary knowledge. His last two books, Los mercaderes en el templo de la literatura and Una Venus mutilada: La crítica literaria en la España actual, constitutes the most solid invitation to the debate done by a critic in the last decade in Spain.

== Works ==
=== Critical studies ===
- (Co-editor) Teoría de la novela, Madrid, Taurus, 1974.
- (Co-editor) Surrealismo/Surrealismos; Latinoamérica y España, Filadelfia, University of Pennsylvania, 1977.
- El narrador en la novela del siglo XIX, Madrid, Taurus, 1976.
- La novela como acto imaginativo, Madrid, Taurus, 1983.
- La novela del XIX: Estudio sobre su evolución formal, Amsterdam, Rodopi,1990
- La novela moderna en España (1885–1902): Los albores de la modernidad, Madrid, Taurus, 1992.
- La novela en la libertad: Introducción a la lectura cultural de la narrativa, Zaragoza, Tropelías, Universidad de Zaragoza, 1999.
- El jardín interior de la burguesía. La novela moderna en España (1885–1902, Madrid, Biblioteca Nueva, 2003.
- Los mercaderes en el templo de la literatura, Madrid, Caballo de Troya, 2004.
- La modernidad silenciada: La cultura española en torno a 1900, Madrid, Biblioteca Nueva, 2006.
- Una Venus mutilada. La crítica literaria en la España actual, Madrid, Biblioteca Nueva, 2008.
- El sexto sentido. La lectura en la era digital, Vigo, Academia del Hispanismo, 2010.

=== Editions ===
- Sotileza, por José María Pereda, Madrid, Espasa-Calpe, 1999; 2a edición 2007.
- Niebla, por Miguel de Unamuno, Madrid, Espasa Calpe, 2006.
- Cándida otra vez, por Marina Mayoral, Madrid Castalia,1992.
- Primera memoria, por Ana María Matute, Barcelona, Destino, 1996.
- Historias del Kronen, por José Ángel Mañas, Barcelona, Destino, 1998; 6a edición, 2004.
- Edad de oro, por Juan Ramón Jiménez. Introducción, edición y notas de G. Gullón y Heilette van Ree, Obra poética, vol. II: Obra en prosa, Madrid, Espasa Calpe, 2005.
- Miau, por Benito Pérez Galdós, Madrid, Espasa Calpe, 1999; 9a edición, 2007.
- La desheredada, por Benito Pérez Galdós, Madrid, Cátedra, 2000; 4a edición 2008.
- Doña Perfecta, por Benito Pérez Galdós, Madrid, Espasa Calpe, 2003; 8a edición, 2007
- Tristana, por Benito Pérez Galdós, Madrid, Espasa Calpe, 2006, 2a edición 2008.
- Fortunata y Jacinta[Antología de estudios críticos], Madrid, Taurus, 1986.
- El alquimista impaciente, por Lorenzo Silva, Madrid, Espasa Calpe, 2008.
- El 19 de marzo y el 2 de mayo, por Benito Pérez Galdós, Madrid, Biblioteca Nueva, 2008.
- Fortunata y Jacinta, por Benito Pérez Galdós, Madrid, Espasa Calpe, 2008.
- Cádiz, por Benito Pérez Galdós, Madrid, Espasa Calpe, 2011.

=== Novels and Short stories ===
- Adiós, Helena de Troya, Barcelona, Destino, 1997
- Azulete, Barcelona, Destino, 2000
- Querida hija, Barcelona, Destino, 1999; Planeta D'Agostini, 2001

=== Other publications ===
- Prologos a Benito Pérez Galdós Misericordia(Círculo de Lectores);Miguel Herráez La estrategia de la postmodernidad en Eduardo Mendoza(Barcelona, Ronsel, 1998); Ángel Ganivet,Los trabajos ddel infatigable creador Pío Cid (Granada, Diputación de Granada, 2000);(Estudio Preliminar) Ricardo Gullón, El destello (Santander, Universidad de Cantabria, 2003;
