= José María de Pereda =

Modern Spanish novelist (1833–1906)

The Most Excellent José María de Pereda
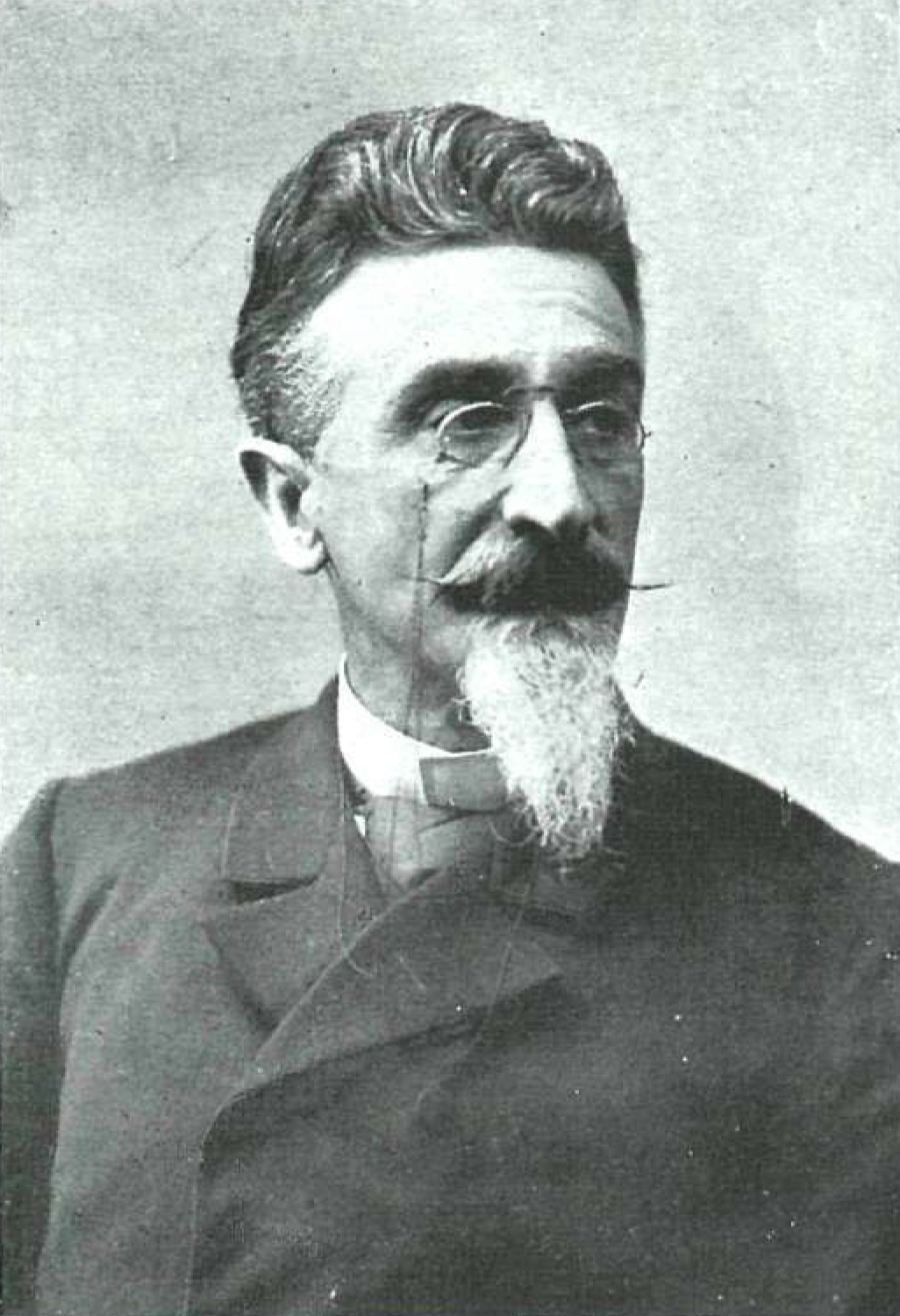
- Born: José María de Pereda y Sánchez de Porrúa; 6 February 1833; Polanco, Spain
- Died: 1 March 1906 (aged 73); Santander, Spain

Seat k of the Real Academia Española
- In office 21 February 1897 – 1 March 1906
- Preceded by: José Castro y Serrano
- Succeeded by: Armando Palacio Valdés

José María de Pereda y Sánchez de Porrúa (born 6 February 1833, Polanco, Cantabria – died 1 March 1906, Polanco) was a Spanish novelist, and a Member of the Royal Spanish Academy.

== Life ==
Pereda was educated at the Institute Cántabro of Santander, whence he went in 1852 to Madrid, where he studied with the vague purpose of entering the artillery corps. Abandoning this design after three years' trial, he returned home and began his literary career by contributing articles to a local journal, La Abeja montañesa in 1858. He also wrote much in a weekly paper, El Tío Cayetano, and in 1864 he collected his powerful realistic sketches of local life and manners under the title of Escenas montañesas (Mountain scenes).

Pereda fought against the revolution of 1868 in El Tío Cayetano, writing the newspaper almost single-handed. In 1871 he was elected as the Carlist deputy for Cabuérniga. In this same year he published a second series of Escenas montañesas under the title of Tipos y paisajes; and in 1876 appeared Bocetos al temple, three tales, in one of which the author describes his disenchanting political experiences.

The Tipos trashumantes belongs to the year 1877, as does El Buey suelto, which was intended as a reply to the thesis of Balzac's work, Les Petites misères de la vie conjugale. More and more pessimistic as to the political future of his country, Pereda took occasion in Don Gonzalo González de la Gonzalera (1879) to ridicule the Revolution as he had seen it at work, and to pour scorn upon the nouveaux riches who exploited Liberalism for their personal ends. Two novels by his friend Pérez Galdós, Doña Perfecta and Gloria, drew from Pereda a reply, De Tal palo tal astilla (1880), in which he endeavours to show that tolerance in religious matters is disastrous alike to nations and to individuals. The Esbozos y rasguños (1881) is of lighter material, and is less attractive than El Sabor de la Tierruca (1882), a striking piece of landscape which won immediate appreciation.

New ground was broken in Pedro Sánchez (1883), where Pereda leaves his native province to portray the disillusion of a sincere enthusiast who has plunged into the political life of the capital. Pereda's masterpiece is Sotileza (1884), a vigorous rendering of marine life. In La Puchera (1889) he returned to the marine subjects which he knew and loved best. Again, in Peñas arriba (1895), the love of country life is manifested in the masterly contrast between the healthy fields and the corrupt, squalid cities.

Pereda's fame was now established; the statutes of the Spanish Academy, which require members to reside at Madrid, were suspended in his favor (1896). But his literary career was over. The death of his eldest son, the disastrous campaign in Cuba and the Philippines (during the Spanish–American War), darkened his closing years, and his health failed long before his death.

Pereda belongs to the native realistic school of Spain, which, founded by the unknown author of Lazarillo de Tormes, was continued by Mateo Alemán, Miguel de Cervantes, Francisco de Quevedo and many others. He saw, knew, understood character; he created not only types, but living personages, such as Andres, Cleto and Muergo in Sotileza, Pedro Juan and Pilara in La Puchera; and he personified the tumult and calm of the sea with more power than Víctor Hugo displayed in Les Travailleurs de la mer.
