= Beauty in Chains =

1918 film

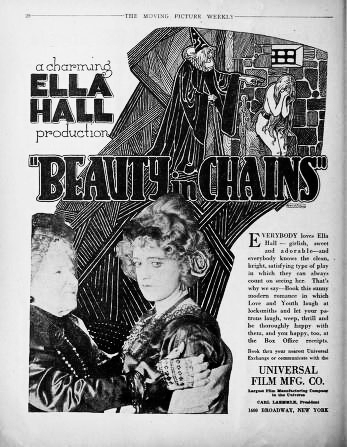
- Motion Picture Weekly ad
- Directed by: Elsie Jane Wilson
- Written by: Elliott J. Clawson
- Based on: Doña Perfecta by Benito Pérez Galdós
- Produced by: Universal
- Starring: Ella Hall; Emory Johnson
- Cinematography: Alfred Gosden
- Distributed by: Universal Film Manufacturing Company
- Release date: March 11, 1918
- Running time: 5 reels
- Country: United States
- Language: Silent (English intertitles)

Beauty in Chains is a 1918 American silent drama film directed by Elsie Jane Wilson based on the novel Doña Perfecta by Benito Pérez Galdós. The film stars Ella Hall and Emory Johnson. The photoplay was released on March 11, 1918, by the Universal Film Manufacturing Company.

== Cast ==
Actor	Role
Ella Hall	Rosarita
Emory Johnson	Pepe Rey Don Jose
Ruby Lafayette	Doña Perfecta
Winter Hall	Don Cayetano
Gretchen Lederer	Juana Toya
Harry Holden	Licurgo
Maxfield Stanley	Jacinto
George A. McDaniel	Caballuco
William Hakeem	Lt. Pinzon

== Preservation ==
With no copies of Beauty in Chains listed in any film archives, it is a lost film.
