= The Battle of Trafalgar (disambiguation) =

The Battle of Trafalgar was a battle of 1805 in the Napoleonic Wars.

The Battle of Trafalgar may also refer to:

- The Battle of Trafalgar (Turner), a painting of 1822 by J. M. W. Turner
- The Battle of Trafalgar (Stanfield), a painting of 1836 by Clarkson Stanfield
- The Battle of Trafalgar (film), a film of 1911 by J. Searle Dawley

== See also ==
- Trafalgar (disambiguation)
- The Death of Nelson (disambiguation)
