= Américo Castro =

Spanish historian

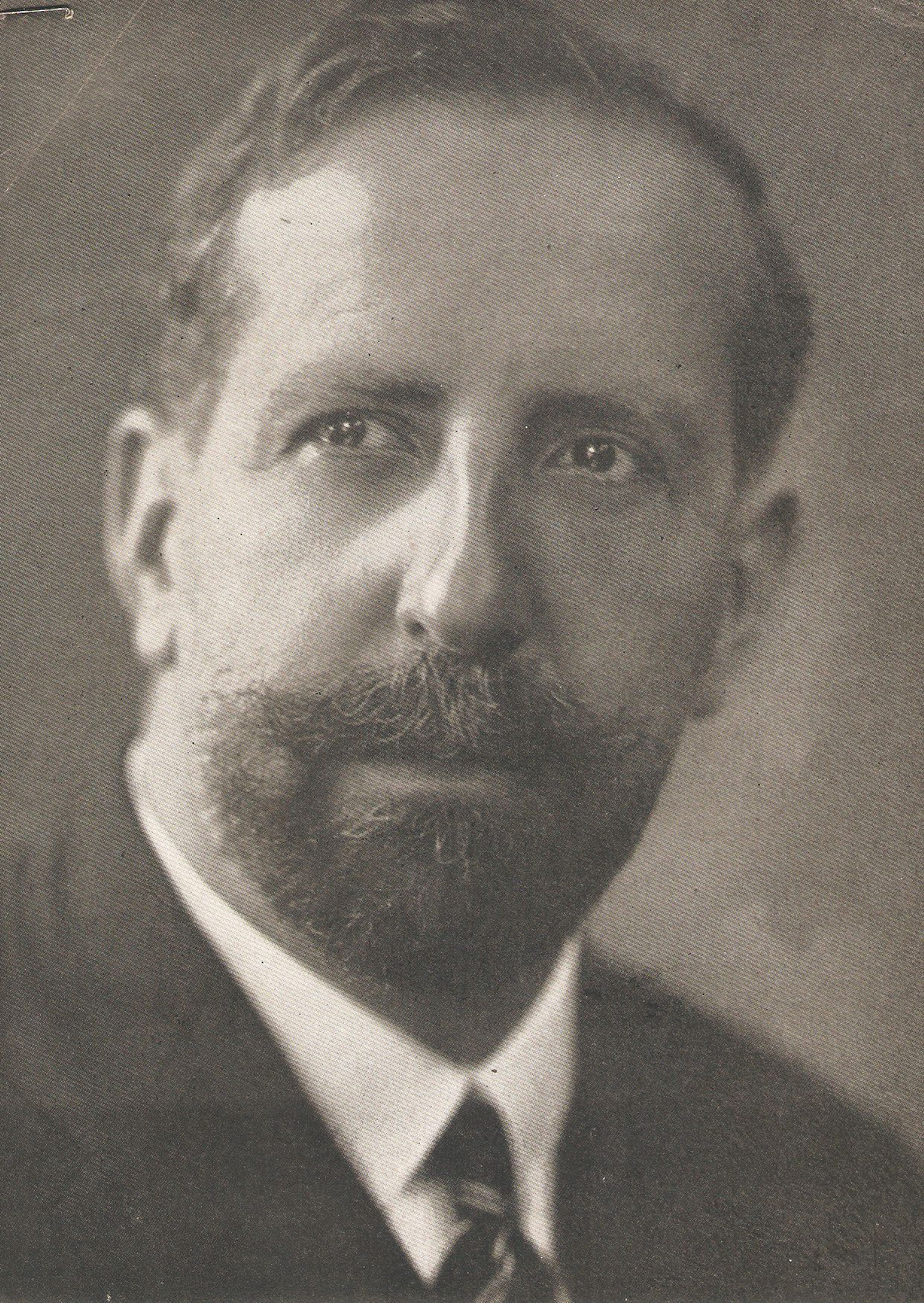

Américo Castro Quesada (May 4, 1885 – July 25, 1972) was a Spanish cultural historian, philologist, and literary critic who challenged some of the prevailing notions of Spanish identity, raising controversy with his conclusions that Spaniards did not become the distinct group that they are today until after the Islamic conquest of Hispania of 711, an event that turned them into an Iberian caste co-existing among Moors and Jews, and that the history of Spain and Portugal was adversely affected with the success in the 11th to the 15th centuries of the "Reconquista" or Christian reconquest of the Iberian Peninsula and with the Spanish expulsion of the Jews (1492).

== Life ==
Castro was born to Spanish parents on May 4, 1885, in Cantagalo, Rio de Janeiro, Brazil. In 1890, his parents returned with him to Spain. In 1904 he graduated from the University of Granada, going on to study at the Sorbonne in Paris from 1905 to 1907. After returning to Spain he organized the Center for Historical Studies in Madrid in 1910 and headed its department of lexicography. In 1915, he became a professor at the University of Madrid.

Later, when the Spanish Republic was declared, Castro became its first ambassador to Germany in 1931. However, when the Spanish Civil War broke out in 1936, he moved to the United States, where he taught literature at the University of Wisconsin–Madison from 1937 to 1939, at the University of Texas from 1939 to 1940 and at Princeton University from 1940 to 1953.

Among Castro's most notable scholarly works are The Life of Lope de Vega (1919); Language, Teaching, and Literature (1924); The Thought of Cervantes (1925); Ibero-America, Its Present and Its Past (1941); The Spaniards: an Introduction to their History (1948); The Structure of Spanish History (1954); and Out of the State of Conflict (1961).

== Sources ==
- Castro, Americo. Edmund L. King, Tr. (1954). The Structure of Spanish History. Princeton, New Jersey: Princeton University Press.
- "Castro, Americo." (2005). The Columbia Electronic Encyclopedia, 6th ed. Retrieved January 21, 2006, from Info Please http://www.infoplease.com/ce6/people/A0810798.html
- "Castro, Américo." (2006). Encyclopædia Britannica. Retrieved January 21, 2006, from Encyclopædia Britannica Premium Service http://www.britannica.com/eb/article-9020733
- José Luis Gómez Martínez, "Américo Castro y Sánchez-Albornoz: Dos posiciones ante el origen de los españoles." Nueva Revista de Filología Hispánica 2l (1972): 30l-320.
- Martin, Marina. (2006). "J. Goytisolo's Vindication of Muslim Spain: Count Julian's Revenge" (description of scholarly paper). The Fourth International Conference on New Directions in the Humanities. Retrieved January 19, 2006, from The Humanities Conference 06 website http://h06.cgpublisher.com/proposals/141/index_html
- Sicroff, Albert A. "Américo Castro and His Critics: Eugenio Asensio." Hispanic Review, Vol. 40, No, 1, 1972, pp. 1–30.
