= José Luis Gómez Martínez =

- Born: José Luis Gómez Martínez; 1 June 1943 (age 83); Soria, Spain
- Occupations: professor, author
- Known for: Theory of the essay, Hispanic non-fiction prose, Latin American thought, and Latin American fiction
- Notable work: Teoría del ensayo (1992), Más allá de la pos-modernidad: el discurso antrópico y su praxis en la cultura iberoamericana (1999)
- Spouse: Béatrice de Thibault (m. 1967)
- Children: 3
- Website: http://www.ensayistas.org

José Luis Gómez Martínez (born 1 June 1943) is professor emeritus of Spanish at the University of Georgia and a former essayist and literary critic. He is known for research into the theory of the essay, along with his work on Hispanic thought and Latin American fiction. During his professional career José Luis Gómez won several awards for his scholarly contributions, including the prestigious Guggenheim Memorial Foundation Fellowship (1984–1985), the Albert Christ-Janer Award (1988), and the 1989 Sturgis Leavitt Prize. In 1999 he was named Professor of the Year by the Georgia Chapter of the American Association of Teachers of Spanish and Portuguese. In 2000 he was elected Membro Correspondente da Academia Brasileira de Filosofia (Acceptance Speech 2005).

== Biography ==
José Luis Gómez Martínez was born in Soria, Spain, on 1 June 1943, in a family of limited financial resources at the end of the Spanish Civil War. His father was Basque and a Republican activist, his mother from the agricultural area of Taldecuende (Soria). His childhood and adolescence took place in small villages of Soria. He studied at the Instituto Antonio Machado of Soria, and once completed, he entered the Teacher College, first in Soria and then, in 1962, in Bilbao. The oppressive socio-political environment of the time (Francisco Franco’s dictatorship) drove him to leave Spain once he finished his studies in 1963. He traveled first to Germany, where he funded his studies in Heidelberg and Munich with temporary jobs.

In 1967, he married Béatrice de Thibault, a Belgian, and they moved to the United States. There, he pursued graduate studies in Linguistics and Hispanic Literature at Roosevelt University, and worked for two years at the Spanish Consulate in Chicago as a cultural link with secondary educational establishments. In 1970, he joined the University of Iowa and obtained his doctorate in 1973. Throughout these years his pedagogic vocation led him to teach private Spanish lessons, high school courses for Spanish emigrants in Germany, and at various institutions in the United States.

In 1974, the University of Georgia offered him a position for the teaching of Spanish and Latin American Thought. In 1989, the University of Georgia appointed him Distinguished Research Professor. He compensated for the relative isolation of teaching at an institution in the American South with active participation in numerous professional associations. He was elected President of the Society for Iberian and Latin American Thought, serving in the role from 1992–1994. Gómez Martinez maintained, above all, fruitful relations, both through the biannual Seminar of Salamanca, Spain, and in several Latin American countries (Bolivia, Argentina, Uruguay, Brazil, Venezuela, Peru, etc.), but especially in Mexico, at the UNAM and Universidad Iberoamericana. Since 1997, he maintains a portal on Internet dedicated to Hispanic Thought (http://www.ensayistas.org/).

In 2000, he was elected "Member Correspondente da Academia Brasileira de philosophy"). In 2008, he was named "Socio de Honor" of the Asociación de Hispanismo Filosófico.

== Intellectual profile ==
The philosophical formation of Gómez Martínez began in Germany as a reaction to Franco’s dictatorship and reading (in German) Ortega y Gasset. Once in the United States, the influence of Américo Castro, José Gaos and Leopoldo Zea brought him back to Ortega y Gasset. These early influences permeated all his intellectual work. The first expression of his thought was a seminal study, “Américo Castro y Sánchez Albonoz” (1972), and the more in-depth examination in his book Américo Castro y el origen de los españoles (1975). Then he complemented this first articulation of his philosophy of history with a theoretical reflection about the essay as a means of communication of thought (Teoría del ensayo, 1981). However, it was through his participation in the biannual international gatherings at the University of Salamanca, that his theoretical base acquired a precise objective in the study of Latin American Thought.

=== Historian of ideas ===
The early influence of Ortega y Gasset and Américo Castro motivated Gómez Martínez’s approach from the field of literature to philosophy, by studying outstanding figures of Spanish thought (Américo Castro,Ortega y Gasset, Ramiro de Maeztu, Francisco de Quevedo, Diego de Saavedra Fajardo, Pérez Galdós, Krausism, and Erasmism, among others). However, in 1980, when he met Mexican philosopher Leopoldo Zea, Gómez Martínez made the recovery of Latin American Ideas a major focus in his research. His platform for dialogue was the Seminar of History of Spanish and Ibero-American Philosophy, led by the Spanish philosopher Antonio Heredia at the University of Salamanca.

According to the Venezuelan philosopher Gloria Comesaña, Gómez Martínez "understands the history of our Latin American Ideas, principally, from our literature and philosophy. Between both disciplines, his succeeds to carry out, on the one hand, an analysis ontosemiotic of the text that reinforces itself with its own existenciary referent, in its word-being relation. On the other hand, he produces an anthropic discursive practice, which opposes the reconstructive thought of Postmodernity, which -in his opinion- continues to be a way of thinking that is centralized and unequivocal, and proposes, on the other hand, the concept of a dynamic center to all axiological discourse" (351–352).

=== Theoretician ===
A theoretical maturation process. Since his first publication,"Américo Castro and Sánchez-Albornoz: two Positions on the Origin of the Spaniards" (1972),

In 1981, he published the first edition of his Theory of the Essay (Second edition augmented in 1992). His theoretical studies support his publications in the field of the History of Ideas: "Krausism, Modernism and the Essay" (1987), "Exile in the Historical-Social Sciences: Towards a Philosophy of History" (1990) and "Epistemological Considerations for a Philosophy of Liberation" (1990). "Postmodernism and the Anthropic Discourse of Liberation" (1996).

In 1999, Gómez Martínez published his finest work, Beyond the Postmodernity: the Anthropic Discourse and its Practice in the Latin-American Culture. The Russian philosopher Edward Demenchónok points out that the objective of this book is to "recover the human being as the referent to the axiological discourse, as the center of communication and the creator of culture. The term anthropic discourse, introduced by the author, is relevant —from the Greek root (anthropic: ántropos)— by pointing to the human being in its fundamental sense (and is associated with a variety of disciplines, from cosmology to ecology). Anthropic means a human approach, a position at the same time ethical and axiological: to see everything from the point of view of man. On the axiological discourse, the anthropic is a form (in the Kantian sense, which means the universal and general importance) that reflects on the contents of the literary, philosophical, and cultural texts. […] Gómez-Martínez centers his theory of anthropic discourse in debate with the post-modern discourse, as an alternative to it. In his analysis of Derrida, Lyotard, among others, the author reveals their main defect: the forgotten human being."

That is, says Carlos Pérez Zavala, "Gómez Martínez clarifies that to challenge modernity, postmodern thinkers, as Derrida, use the term 'deconstruction'. Deconstruction arises from a logocentrism supposedly 'eccentric', sustraido-abstraido, to the structure, and therefore purports the act of meaning. The author appeals, as does the Latin American Philosophy of Liberation, to the concept of problematization, which suggests a questioning of the inner structure, understood as a transformable, dynamic contextualization. In this way the problematization put forward by the anthropic discourse tends to liberate the act of meaning from the limitation generated by the static rigidity of the discourse of modernity, and to turn it into an act of contextualization within a process by which man is and modifies, remains and changes, encodes and re-encodes."

Beyond Postmodernity is, in effect, Gómez Martínez’ best work, which then allows novel formulations, both in the pedagogical and in the socio-cultural field, that anticipated the impact of the digital revolution of our time: "Education and Globalization. The Hypertext in the Future of Education", 2002, "Towards a New Paradigm: the Hypertext as a Socio-Cultural Facet of Technology" (2001), or "Producer-consumer: The Advent of the Prosumer" (2006).

== Selected works ==
=== Books ===
- Mas allá de la pos-modernidad: el discurso antrópico y su praxis en la cultura iberoamericana. Madrid: Mileto, 1999.
- Leopoldo Zea: el hombre y su obra, 1998. (Digital Edition revised and expanded: http://www.ensayistas.org/filosofos/mexico/zea/)
- Leopoldo Zea. Madrid: Ediciones del Orto, 1997.
- Teoria Eseje. Bratislava: Archa, 1996 (Edition in Slovak: revised and adapted. Translation of Paulína Sismisová; Col. Filozofia do Vrecka)
- Pensamiento de la liberación: Proyección de Ortega en Iberoamérica. Madrid: EGE, 1995.
- Teoría del ensayo. Proyecto Ensayo Hispánico, 1999 (Digital Edition, revised: http://www.ensayistas.org/critica/ensayo/).
- Teología y pensamiento de la liberación en la literatura iberoamericana. Madrid: Milenio Ediciones, 1996.
- Teoría del ensayo. México: UNAM, 1992. (2nd edition: revised and expanded).
- España: 1975–1990. Athens: Georgia Series of Hispanic Thought, 1991.
- Anuario Bibliográfico de Historia del Pensamiento Ibero e Iberoamericano. 5 vols. Athens: UGA, Georgia Series on Hispanic Thought, 1986–1990. http://www.ensayistas.org/anuario/
- Bolivia: un pueblo en busca de su identidad. Cochabamba: Los Amigos del Libro (Enciclopedia Boliviana), 1988.
- Chile: 1968–1988. Athens: UGA, Center for Latin American Studies, 1988.
- Bolivia: 1952–1986. La paz: Editorial Artística, 1986.
- Teoría del ensayo. Salamanca: Universidad de Salamanca, 1981.
- Américo Castro y el origen de los españoles: Historia de una polémica. Madrid: Editorial Gredos, 1975.

== Secondary literature ==
- Andueza, María. "Teoría del ensayo," Cuadernos Américanos 41 (1993): 229–234.
- Castro-Gómez, Santiago. "Posmodernidad. Discurso antrópico y ensayística latinoamericana," Signos en Rotación (Venezuela, Suplemento cultural de La Verdad) 3.122 (Agosto 20, 2000).
- Comesaña-Santilices, Gloria. "Presentación: José Luis Gómez-Martínez, posmodernidad y discurso antrópico," Signos en Rotación (Venezuela, Suplemento cultural de La Verdad) 3.122 (Agosto 20, 2000).
- "Posmodernidad, discurso antrópico y ensayística latinoamericana. Entrevista con José Luis Gómez Martínez," Dissens. Revista Internacional de Pensamiento Latinoamericano 2 (1996): 45–49.
- Ramaglia, Dante. "Gómez Martínez: Pensamiento de la liberación," Cuyo: Anuario de Filosofía Argentina y Americana 14 (1997): 227–237. Online: http://bdigital.uncu.edu.ar/objetos_digitales/1638/ramagliacuyo14.pdf
- Sánchez Albornoz, Claudio. "Otra vez una vieja polémica," in Estudios Polémicos. Madrid: Espasa-Calpe, 1979, pp. 302–310.
