= Trafalgar (novel) =

Novel by Benito Pérez Galdós

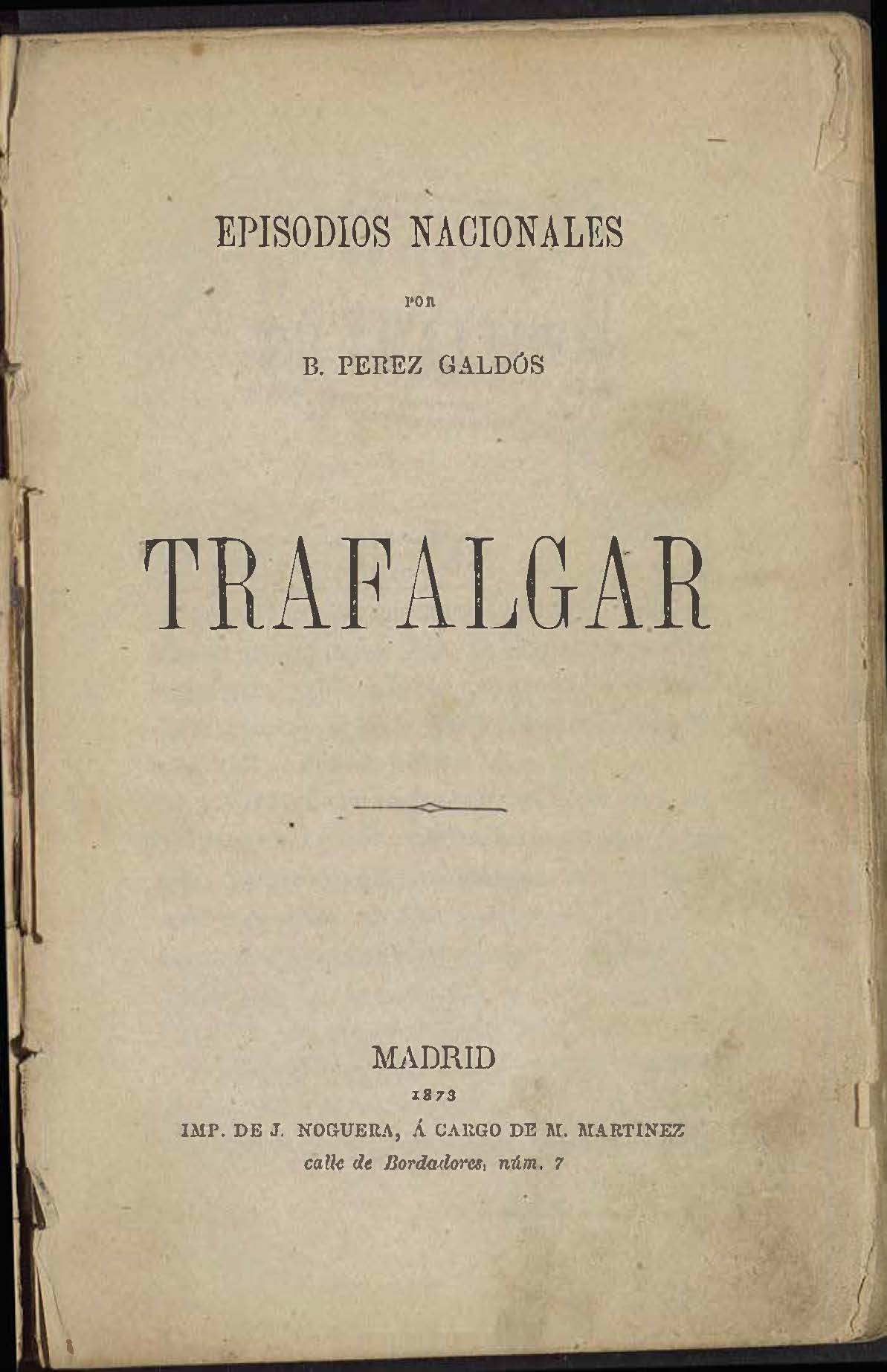
- Trafalgar (Spanish first edition, 1873)
- Author: Benito Pérez Galdós
- Language: Spanish
- Series: Episodios Nacionales
- Release number: 1st in series
- Genre: Adventure fiction, Sea story, Historical novel
- Publication date: 1873
- Publication place: Spain
- Followed by: The Court of Charles IV

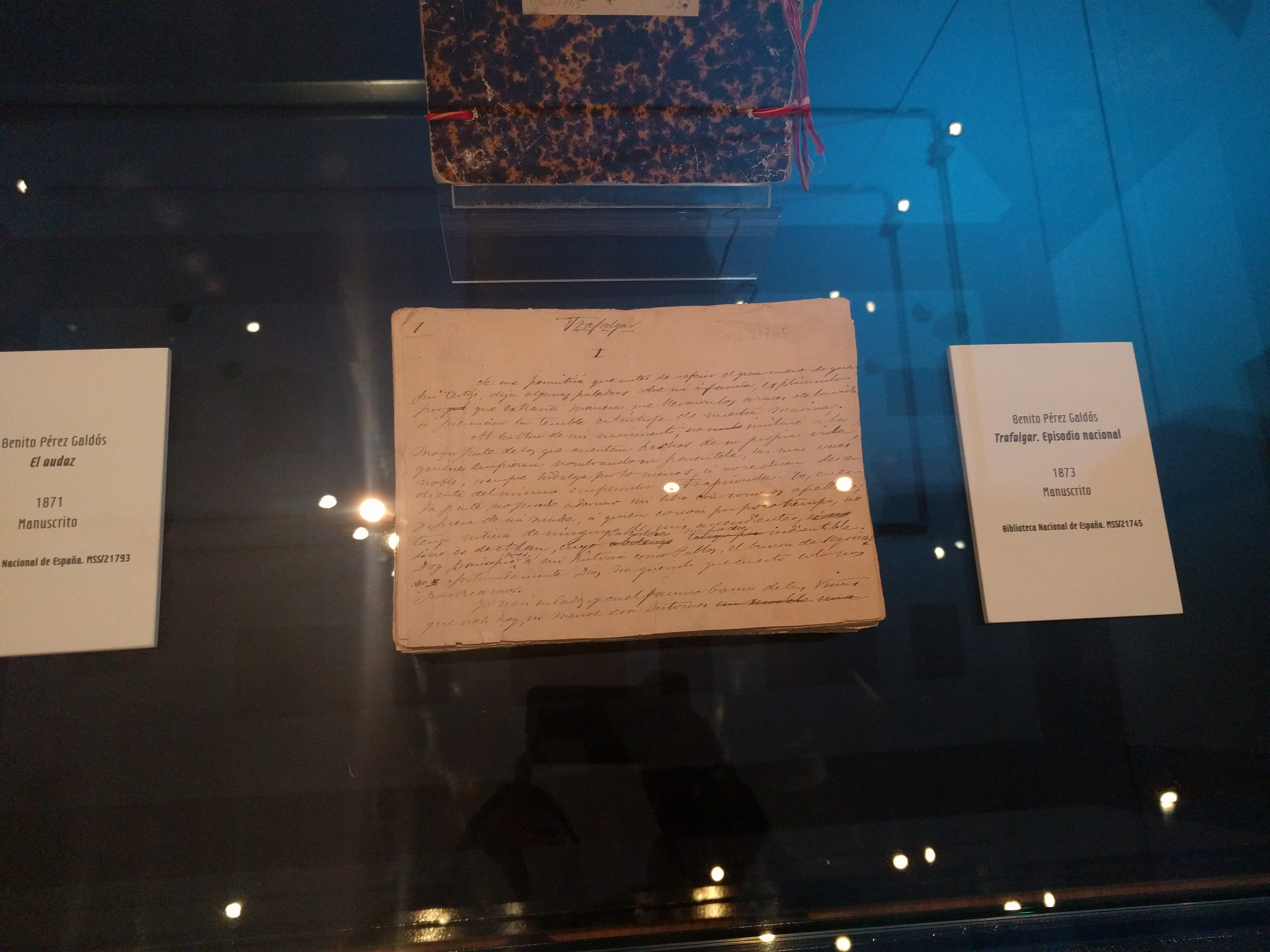
Manuscript of Trafalgar, 1873. Biblioteca Nacional de España.

"Trafalgar" is a novel by Spanish author Benito Pérez Galdós and the first novel of the first series in the Episodios Nacionales (National Episodes). It was first published in 1873 in Spain. The novel is set at the beginning of the 19th century and narrates the Battle of Trafalgar during the Napoleonic Wars.

== Writing and background ==
Galdós began writing it on January 6, 1873, and it was published in February, barely a month later. However, he had been studying source materials and documentation since the summer of 1872, when he met a veteran sailor who had participated in the Battle of Trafalgar while staying in Santander. (Note: Galdós himself would later describe him as "a very charming old man, of short stature, wearing outdated coat and top hat: his last name was Galán and he had been a cabin boy on the gigantic ship Santísima Trinidad."»)

As in most of the episodes of this first series, the action is narrated in the first person by Gabriel de Araceli, a heroic character who will evolve throughout it, blending his romantic and often melodramatic biography with the most significant chapters of Spain's history between 1805 and 1875.

Various authors throughout the 20th century, from Rafael Altamira to Pedro Ortiz-Armengol, have highlighted Galdós's narrative genius in this beginning of his monumental chronicle of 19th-century Spanish history.

== Plot ==
In this first episode, Gabriel is introduced as an orphaned rascal from Cádiz who, at the age of 14, becomes involved in the Battle of Trafalgar as a servant to an old officer of the Navy in reserve. The action takes place in October 1805 and narrates, with a certain epic rhythm, the preparations, development, and outcome of the battle, with Gabriel enlisted on the Santísima Trinidad, flagship of the Spanish Navy.

== See also ==
- Episodios Nacionales
- Spanish Realist literature
- La Comédie humaine
