= Juan Valera y Alcalá-Galiano =

Spanish writer (1824–1905)

The Most Excellent Juan Valera y Alcalá-Galiano
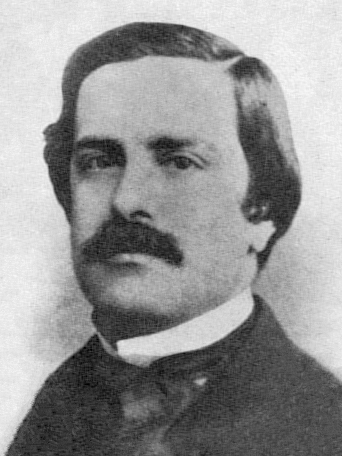
- Juan Valera
- Born: 18 October 1824; Cabra (Córdoba), Spain
- Died: 18 April 1905 (aged 80); Madrid, Spain
- Occupations: Politician, diplomat

Seat I of the Real Academia Española
- In office 16 March 1862 (Note: Elected on 2 May 1861) – 18 April 1905
- Preceded by: Jerónimo del Campo y Roselló
- Succeeded by: Santiago Ramón y Cajal (Note: Ramón y Cajal was elected for the position in 1905 but never took the seat)

Juan Valera y Alcalá-Galiano (18 October 1824 – 18 April 1905) was a Spanish realist author, diplomat, and politician.

== Life ==
He was born at Cabra, in the province of Córdoba, and was educated at Málaga and at the University of Granada, where he took his degree in law, and then entered upon a diplomatic career (1847). Over five decades, Valera filled a number of positions in a variety of places. He accompanied the Spanish Ambassador to Naples. Afterwards, he was a member of the Spanish legations at Lisbon (1850), Rio de Janeiro (1851–53), Dresden and St. Petersburg (1854–57 with the Duke of Osuna). He wrote about the latter mission in Cartas desde Rusia, poking "gentle fun" at his fellow diplomat, Mauricio Álvarez de las Asturias Bohorques y Guiráldez, the third Duke of Gor. After his return to Madrid, he became one of the editors of the liberal journal El Contemporáneo (1859), and was appointed Minister to Frankfurt (1865). After the revolution of 1868 he was appointed Assistant Secretary of State and (1871) Director of Public Instruction. During the reign of Alphonso XII he was Minister to Lisbon (1881–83), Washington (1883–86), and Brussels (1886–88), and in 1893-95 Ambassador to Vienna. He was elected to the Academy of Moral and Political Sciences in 1900.

Throughout his diplomatic and political activity he produced works which rank among the highest that his country's literature contains. For purity of diction and beauty of style Valera has never been surpassed in Spain. Pepita Jiménez, which appeared as a serial in 1874, is probably his best known work; it has since been translated into many languages. It depicts the gradual realization by a young seminarian of the empty vanity of his vocation, culminating in a shattering denouement. Other novels are Las ilusions del doctor Faustino (1875), El comendador Mendoza (1877), Pasarse de listo, and Doña Luz (1879). All of the foregoing novels were written around the time when he abandoned his political activities. He was also a supporter of Iberian Federalism.

== Literature ==
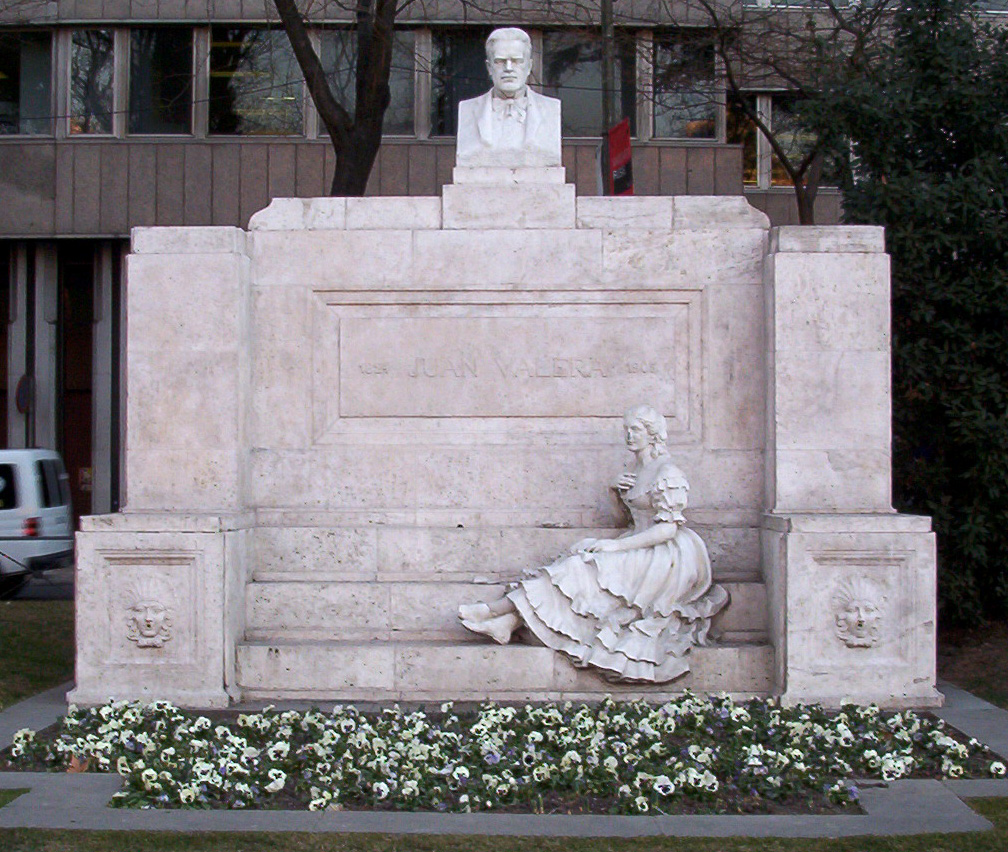
Monument to Valera in Madrid (L. Coullaut, 1928).

- Juan Valera, Dona Luz: A Novel, translated by Robert M. Fedorchek, Bucknell University Press (2002).
- Juan Valera, Obras Completas (Madrid, 1905 et seq., 43 volumes to 1916)
- Juan Valera, The Illusions of Doctor Faustino, translated by Robert M. Fedorchek. The Catholic University of America Press (2008)
- Juan Valera, Juanita la Larga, translated by Robert M. Fedorchek. The Catholic University of America (2006)
- Ferdinand Brunetière, La casuistique dans le roman de Juan Valera, in his series Histoire et littérature, volume i (Paris, 1884)
- Emilia Pardo Bazán, "Retratos y apuntes literaros," in Obras completas, volume xxxii (Madrid, 1891 et seq.)
- Conde de Casa Valencia, Necrologia de ... D. J. V. (Madrid, 1905)
- Conde de las Navas, Don Juan Valera (Madrid, 1905)
- J. D. Fitz-Gerald, "Juan Valera," in The Bookman, volume xxi (New York, 1905)
- Karimi, Kian-Harald (2007): Jenseits von altem Gott und ‘Neuem Menschen’. Präsenz und Entzug des Göttlichen im Diskurs der spanischen Restaurationsepoche. Frankf./M.: Vervuert. ISBN 3-86527-313-0
- F. Vézinet, Les maitres du roman aspagnol contemporain (Paris, 1907)
