= Trafalgar School =

Trafalgar School may refer to:

- Trafalgar School for Girls, a private anglophone secondary school in Montreal, Quebec, Canada
- The Trafalgar School at Downton, a coeducational secondary school in Downton, Wiltshire, England
- Trafalgar School, Portsmouth, a coeducational secondary school in Portsmouth, Hampshire, England
- Trafalgar Castle School, a private day and boarding school for girls in Whitby, Ontario, Canada
- Trafalgar High School, a coeducational high school in Trafalgar, Victoria, Australia
- Trafalgar Middle School (Nelson, British Columbia), a coeducational middle school in Nelson, British Columbia, Canada
- Oakville Trafalgar High School, a coeducational secondary school in Oakville, Ontario, Canada
- Trafalgar High School (Cape Town), a secondary school in Cape Town, South Africa

== See also ==
- Trafalgar (disambiguation)
