= The Death of Nelson =

The Death of Nelson may refer to any of the following paintings depicting the death of Horatio Nelson, 1st Viscount Nelson:

- The Death of Nelson (West painting), an 1806 work by Benjamin West
- The Death of Nelson, 21 October 1805, an 1807 work by Arthur William Devis
- The Death of Nelson (Maclise painting), an 1859–64 work by Daniel Maclise
