= Portrait of Benito Pérez Galdós =

1894 painting by Joaquín Sorolla

- Retrato de Benito Pérez Galdós (Spanish)
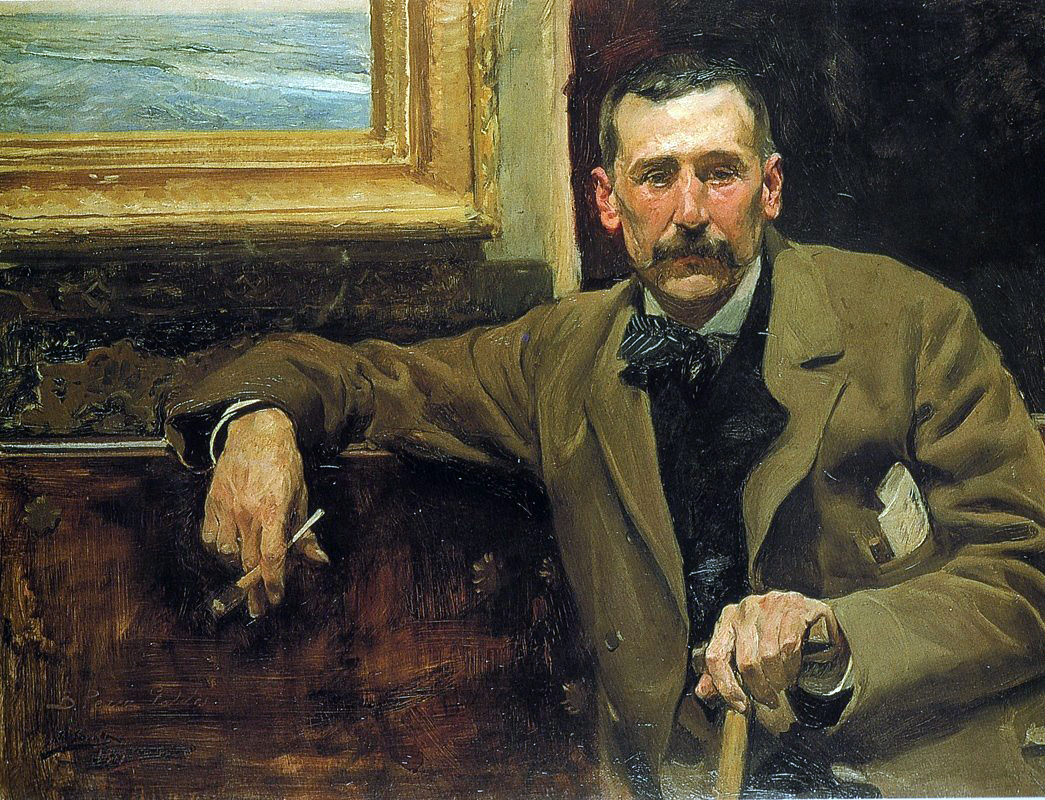
- Artist: Joaquín Sorolla
- Year: 1894
- Medium: Oil portrait painting
- Movement: Postimpressionism
- Dimensions: 73 cm × 98 cm (29 in × 39 in)
- Location: Casa-Museo Pérez Galdós, Las Palmas de Gran Canaria

Portrait of Benito Pérez Galdós (Spanish: Retrato de Benito Pérez Galdós is an oil portrait painting by Joaquín Sorolla made in 1894 of the Spanish writer Benito Pérez Galdós at age 51.

In 1973, it was acquired by the grandsons of Galdós for the Cabildo Insular de Gran Canaria. In 2014, it was temporarily moved to Museo del Prado for an exhibition. After the exhibition, the painting was shown to have minor damage and was restored by the museum staff.
