= Miau =

1888 novel by Benito Pérez Galdós

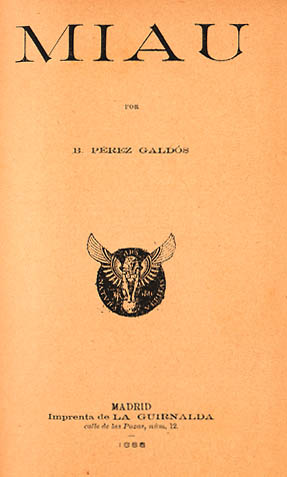
- The front (first) page of the first edition.
- Author: Benito Pérez Galdós
- Language: Spanish
- Genre: Realism
- Publisher: Imprenta de la Guirnalda, Madrid
- Publication date: 1888
- Publication place: Spain

Miau is a realist novel by Spanish writer Benito Pérez Galdós, released in 1888. It tells a story about a lower-middle class family of Madrid in the 19th century. The main character is Ramón Villaamil, an ex-employee from the Ministry of Economy and Finance. He lives with his wife doña Pura, his sister-in-law Milagros, his daughter Abelarda, his grandson Luis Cadalso, and his detestable son-in-law Víctor Cadalso. Víctor's wife, Luisa Villaamil, who is dead, was the mother of Luis. Miau is the Spanish onomatopoeia for the sound made by cats, but it also stands for: Moralidad, Income tax, Aduanas y Unificación de la deuda (morality, income tax, customs and unification of the debt), the four main ideas of Villaamil to improve the ministry administration.

The work was "ignored or lightly regarded by the writer's contemporaries," and it was not until Robert J. Weber published The Miau Manuscript of Benito Pérez Galdós: A Critical Study in 1964 that significant academic attention was drawn to the work, resulting in a "critical explosion" of interest and analysis.
