= Trafalgar Square (disambiguation) =

Trafalgar Square is a square near Charing Cross in Central London, England that commemorates the Battle of Trafalgar.

Trafalgar Square may also refer to:

- Trafalgar Square, a painting by Piet Mondrian
- National Heroes Square in Barbados, formerly known as Trafalgar Square
- Trafalgar Square Publishing, a publishing house and distribution company specialising in UK publishers
