= Doña Perfecta =

1876 novel by Benito Pérez Galdós

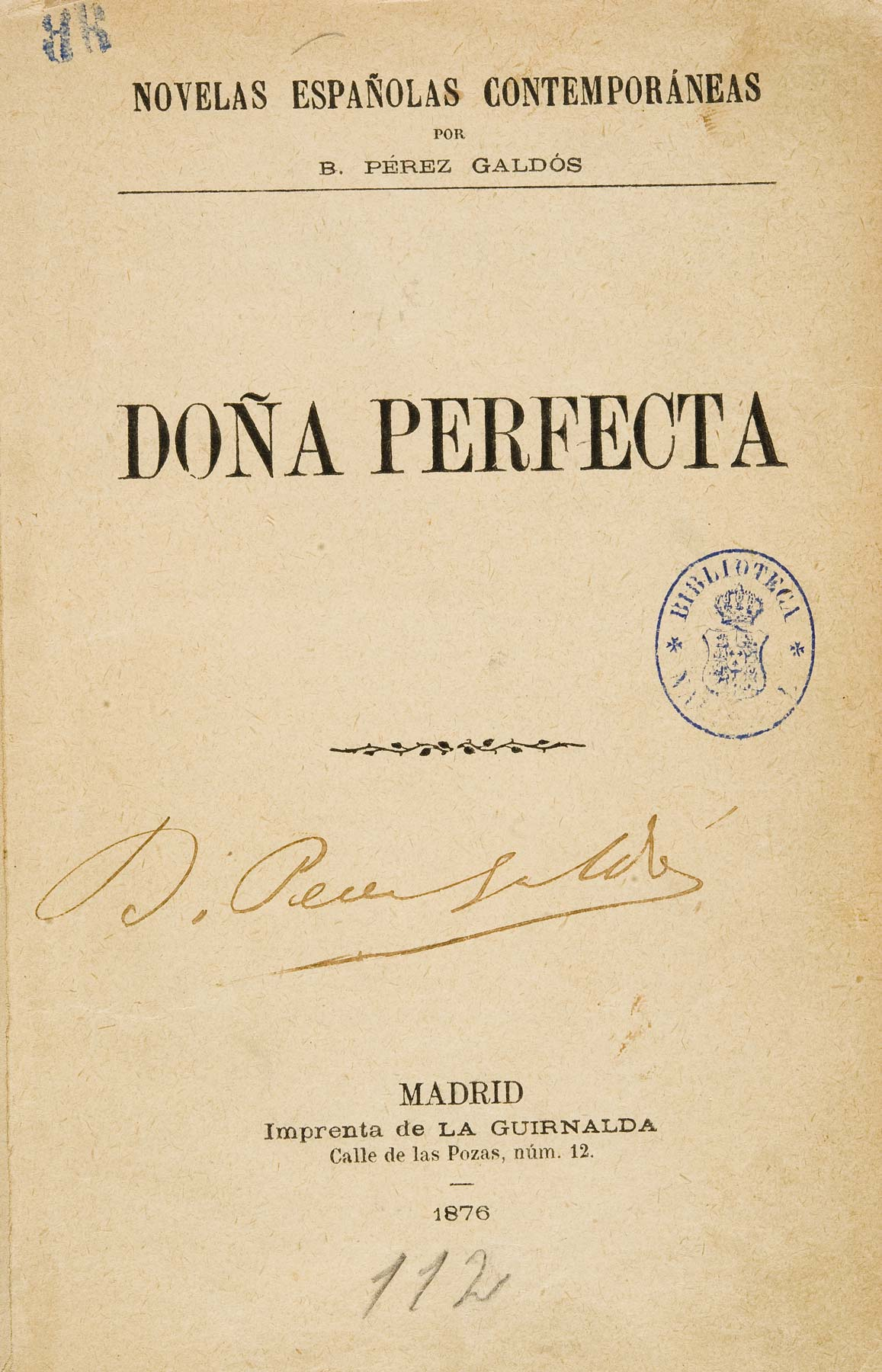
- The front (first) page of the first edition with the author's signature (National Library of Spain).
- Author: Benito Pérez Galdós
- Language: Spanish
- Genre: Realism
- Publisher: Imprenta de la Guirnalda, Madrid
- Publication date: 1876
- Publication place: Spain

Doña Perfecta (1876) is a 19th-century realist novel by Benito Pérez Galdós from what is called the first of Galdós's three epochs in his novels of social analysis.

== Plot summary ==
The action occurs in 19th-century Spain, when a young liberal named Don José (Pepe) Rey arrives in a cathedral city named Orbajosa, with the intention of marrying his cousin Rosario. This was a marriage of convenience arranged between Pepe's father Juan and Juan's sister, Perfecta.

Upon getting to know each other, Pepe and Rosario declare their eternal love, but in steps Don Inocencio, the cathedral canon, who meddles and obstructs the marriage as well as the good intentions of Doña Perfecta and her brother Don Juan. Over the course of time, several events lead up to a confrontation between Pepe Rey and his aunt Perfecta (supposedly based on Galdós's difficult relationship with his mother), which is caused by her refusal to allow Pepe and Rosario to marry, because Pepe is a non-believer. The novel ends up with the death of Pepe Rey due to his aunt Perfecta. Rosario turns mad and ends up in a madhouse.

The novel illustrates the great power that the church wielded. It also describes the differences between the traditional, provincial outlook, and the modern, liberal outlook of Madrid, the capital.

== Film, TV or theatrical adaptations ==
The lost 1918 American silent film Beauty in Chains was adopted from the novel.

In 1951, Alejandro Galindo directed a film adaptation written by Gunther Gerzso set in Mexican sites and times with Dolores del Río as Doña Perfecta.

In 1977, the film version was written and directed by César Fernández Ardavín. Julia Gutiérrez Caba played Doña Perfecta. The cast included other actors such as José Luis López Vázquez, Manuel Sierra, Victoria Abril, Emilio Gutiérrez Caba, Fernando Sancho and Mirta Miller.

In 1985, there was a TV version made in Venezuela by Venezolana de Televisión with Lupita Ferrer as Doña Perfecta.
