= Benito Pérez Galdós =

Spanish realist novelist (1843–1920)

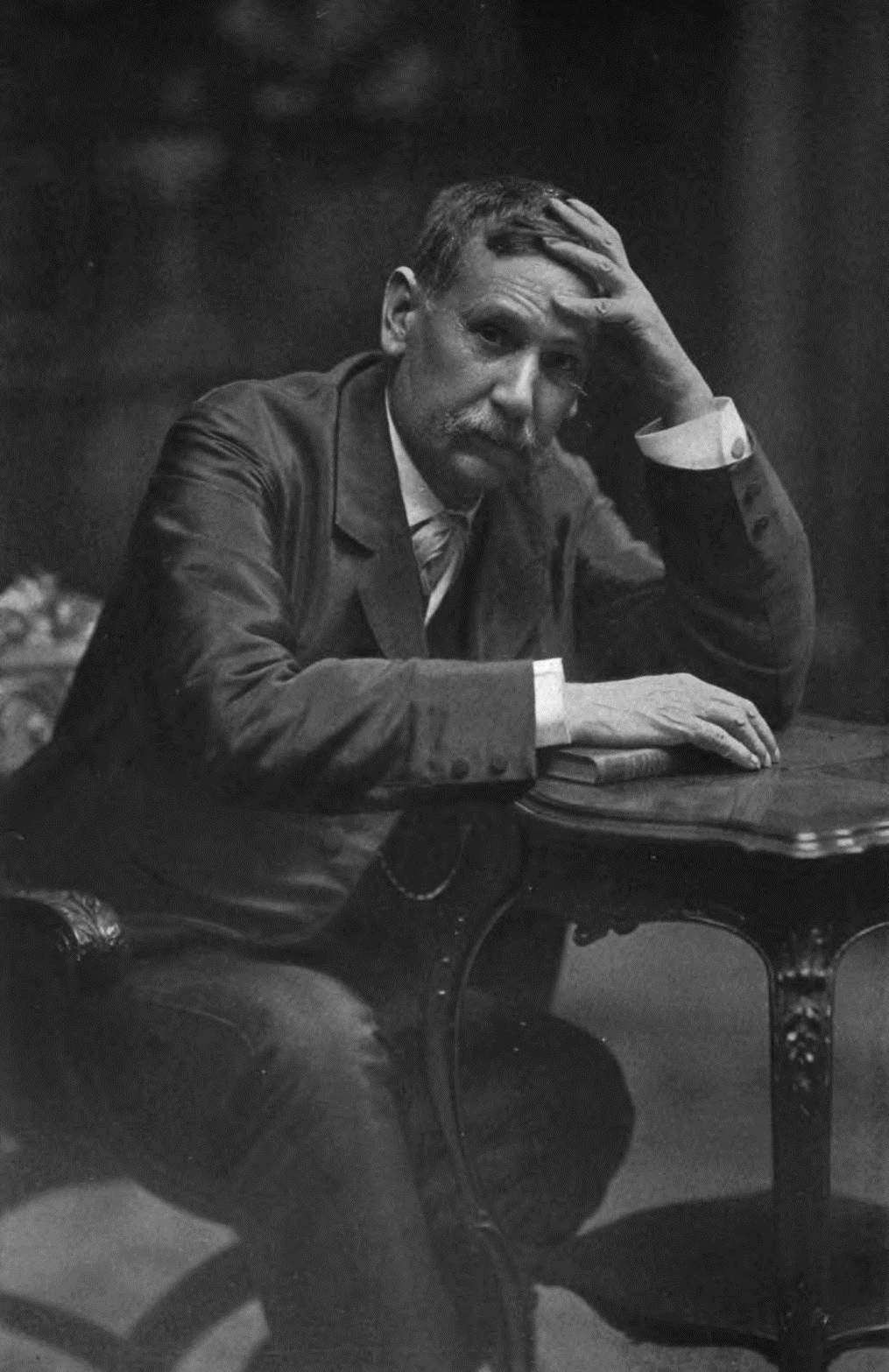
- Born: Benito María de los Dolores Pérez Galdós; 10 May 1843; Las Palmas, Canary Islands, Spain
- Died: 4 January 1920 (aged 76); Madrid, Spain
- Occupations: Novelist; playwright; politician
- Writing career
- Movement: Realism

Seat N of the Real Academia Española
- In office 7 February 1897 – 4 January 1920
- Preceded by: León Galindo de Vera
- Succeeded by: Leonardo Torres Quevedo

Benito María de los Dolores Pérez Galdós (Spanish pronunciation: [beˈnito ˈpeɾeθ ɣalˈðos]; 10 May 1843 – 4 January 1920) was a Spanish realist novelist and politician. He was a leading literary figure in 19th-century Spain, and some scholars consider him second only to Miguel de Cervantes in stature as a Spanish novelist.

Pérez Galdós was a prolific writer, publishing 31 major novels, 46 historical novels in five series, 23 plays, and the equivalent of 20 volumes of shorter fiction, journalism and other writings. He remains popular in Spain, and is considered equal to Charles Dickens, Honoré de Balzac and Leo Tolstoy. He is less well known in Anglophone countries, but some of his works have now been translated into English. His play Realidad (1892) is important in the history of realism in the Spanish theatre. The Pérez Galdós museum in Las Palmas, Gran Canaria features a portrait of the writer by Joaquín Sorolla.

Pérez Galdós was nominated for the Nobel Prize for Literature in 1912, but his opposition to religious authorities led him to be boycotted by conservative sectors of Spanish society, and traditionalist Catholics, who did not recognize his literary merit.

Galdós was interested in politics, although he did not consider himself a politician. His political beginnings were liberal, and he later embraced republicanism and then socialism, under Pablo Iglesias Posse. Early on he joined the Sagasta Progressive Party and in 1886 became a deputy for Guayama, Puerto Rico. At the beginning of the 20th century he joined the Republican Party and was elected deputy to the Madrid cortes for the Republican–Socialist Conjunction in the legislatures of 1907 and 1910. In 1914 he was elected deputy for Las Palmas.

== Childhood and first years ==
Pérez Galdós was born on 10 May 1843 in Calle Cano in Las Palmas de Gran Canaria, in a house that is now the Casa-Museo of Pérez Galdós. He was the tenth and last son of lieutenant colonel Don Sebastián Pérez and Doña Dolores Galdós. He was baptised Benito María de los Dolores at the church of San Francisco de Asís, (es) two days after his birth.

Pérez Galdós studied at San Agustín school, where he was taught by teachers trained in the principles of the enlightenment. In 1862, after completing his secondary studies, he travelled to Tenerife to obtain his certificate in bachillerato in arts. That same year he moved to Madrid to start a law degree, which he did not complete.

While at university, Pérez Galdós frequented the Ateneo of Madrid and other gatherings of intellectuals and artists. He became acquainted with life in Madrid and witnessed the political and historical events of the time, which were reflected in his journalistic works and in his early novels, The Golden Fountain Café (La Fontana de oro) (1870) and El audaz (1871).

== Career as a writer ==
Pérez Galdós led a comfortable life, living first with two of his sisters and then at the home of his nephew, José Hurtado de Mendoza. He got up at sunrise and wrote regularly until ten o'clock in the morning, in pencil, because he considered the use of a pen a waste of time. He would then go for walks in Madrid to eavesdrop on other people's conversations and to gather details for his novels. He did not drink, but smoked leaf cigars incessantly. In the afternoons he read in Spanish, English or French; he preferred the classics, including Shakespeare, Dickens, Cervantes, Lope de Vega and Euripides. In later years, he began to read Leo Tolstoy. In the evenings he would return to his walks, unless there was a concert, for he adored music. He went to bed early and almost never went to the theater.

According to Ramón Pérez de Ayala, Pérez Galdós dressed casually, using sombre tones to go unnoticed. In winter he would wear a white woollen scarf wrapped around his neck, with a half-smoked cigar in his hand and, when seated, his German shepherd dog beside him. He was in the habit of wearing his hair cropped "al rape" and, apparently, suffered from severe migraines.

By 1865, he was publishing articles in La Nación on literature, art, music, and politics. He completed three plays between 1861 and 1867, but none were published at the time. In 1868, Pérez Galdós' translation of Pickwick Papers introduced Dickens' work to the Spanish public. In 1870, Pérez Galdós was appointed editor of La Revista de España and began to express his opinions on a wide range of topics from history and culture, to politics and literature. Between 1867 and 1868, he wrote his first novel, La Fontana de Oro, a historical work set in the period 1820–1823. With the help of money from his sister-in-law, it was published privately in 1870. Critical reaction was slow, but this was eventually hailed as the beginning of a new phase in Spanish fiction, and was highly praised for its literary quality as well as for its social and moral purpose.

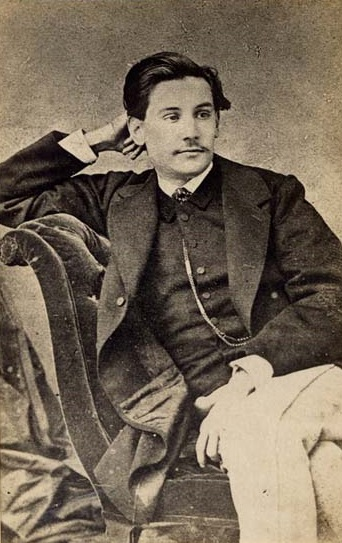
Pérez Galdós, c. 1863

== National Episodes ==
Pérez Galdós next developed the outline of a major project, the Episodios Nacionales: a series of historical novels outlining the major events in Spanish history starting from the Battle of Trafalgar in 1805. The Mexican-Spanish writer Max Aub said:

"If all the historical material of those years (19th century) were lost, saving the work of Galdós, it would not matter. There is complete, alive, real life of the nation during the hundred years that covered the author's claw. There are, forever, its hundreds and hundreds of historical and imagined characters, as true one as the other (...) Only the greatest in the world, and there are enough fingers to count them, achieved as much. And even more: I would leave him in the novel glory of his time hand in hand with Tolstoy, because, besides giving life to beings forever present, they knew how to bring to light the genius of their homeland through its struggles, glories and misfortunes (...) Galdós has done more for the knowledge of Spain by the Spaniards (...) than all the historians together".

The first volume was called Trafalgar and appeared in 1873. Successive volumes appeared irregularly, until the forty-sixth and final novel, Cánovas, was published in 1912. These historical novels sold well, and they remained the basis of Pérez Galdós' contemporary reputation and income. He used careful research to write these stories, and to achieve balance and wider perspectives, Pérez Galdós often sought out survivors and eyewitnesses to the actual events – such as an old man who had been a cabin boy aboard the ship Santísima Trinidad at Trafalgar, who became the central figure of that book. Pérez Galdós was often critical of the official versions of the events he described, and often ran into problems with the Catholic Church, then a dominant force in Spanish cultural life.

== Other novels ==
Literary critic José Montesinos classified Pérez Galdós' other novels into the following groups:

1. The early works from La Fontana de Oro up to La familia de León Roch (1878). The best known of these is Doña Perfecta (1876), which describes the impact made by the arrival of a young radical on a stiflingly clerical town. In Marianela (1878) a young man regains his eyesight after a life of blindness and rejects his best friend Marianela for her ugliness.
2. The novelas españolas contemporáneas, from La desheredada (1881) to Angel Guerra (1891), a loosely related series of 22 novels which are the author's major claim to literary distinction, including his masterpiece Fortunata y Jacinta (1886–87). They are bound together by the device of recurring characters, borrowed from Balzac's La Comédie humaine. Fortunata y Jacinta is almost as long as War and Peace. It concerns the fortunes of four characters: a young man-about-town, his wife, his lower-class mistress, and her husband. The character of Fortunata is based on a real girl whom Pérez Galdós first saw in a tenement building in Madrid, drinking a raw egg – which is the way in which the fictional characters come to meet.
3. The later novels of psychological investigation, many of which are in dialogue form.

== Influences and characteristics ==
Pérez Galdós was a frequent traveller. His novels display a detailed knowledge of many cities, towns and villages across Spain – such as Toledo in Angel Guerra. He visited Great Britain on many occasions, his first trip being in 1883. The descriptions of the various districts and low-life characters that he encountered in Madrid, particularly in Fortunata y Jacinta, are similar to the approaches of Dickens and the French Realist novelists such as Balzac. Pérez Galdós also showed a keen interest in technology and crafts, for example the lengthy descriptions of ropery in La desheredada or the detailed accounts of how the heroine of La de Bringas (1884) embroiders her pictures out of hair.

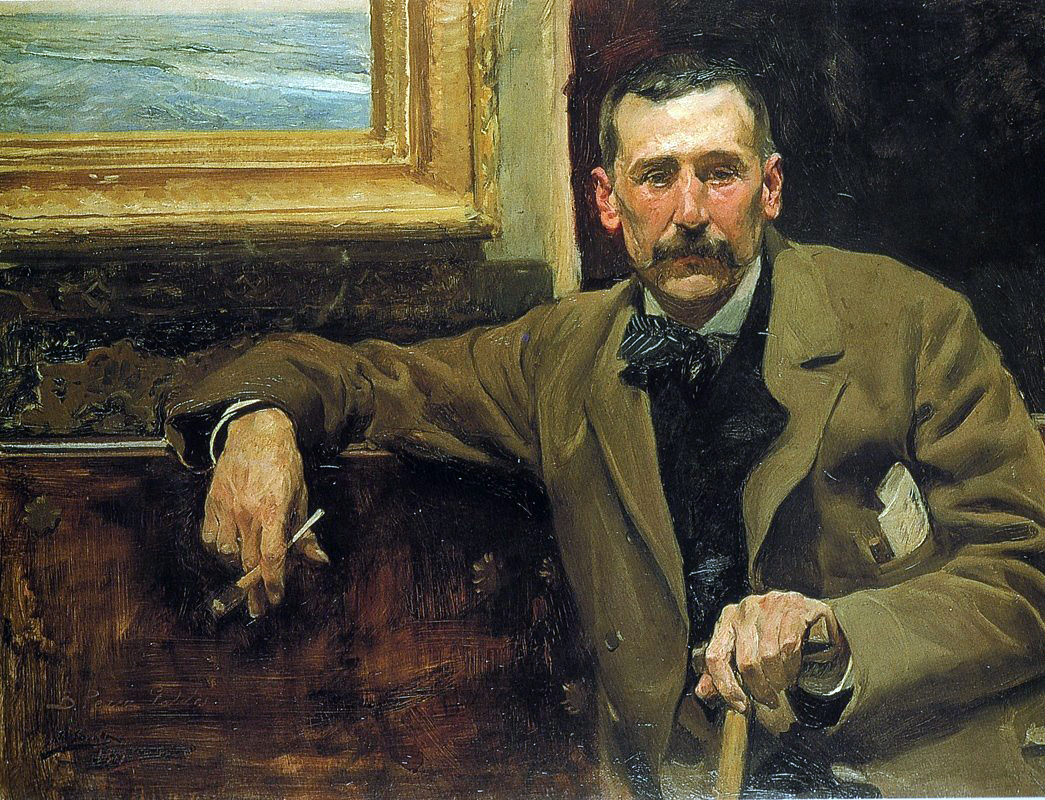
Portrait of Benito Pérez Galdós, by Joaquín Sorolla, 1894

Galdós was also inspired by Émile Zola and naturalism in which writers strove to show how their characters were forged by the interaction of heredity, environment and social conditions. This set of influences is perhaps clearest in Lo prohibido (1884–85), which is also noteworthy for being told in the first person by an unreliable narrator who dies during the course of the work. This pre-dates similar experiments by André Gide such as L'immoraliste.

Pérez Galdós was also influenced by philosopher Karl Christian Friedrich Krause, made famous in Spain via the educationalist Francisco Giner de los Ríos. One example of this can be seen his novel El Amigo Manso (1882), but it is also clear that the mystical tendencies of krausismo led to his interest in the wisdom sometimes shown by people who appear to be mad. This is an important theme in the works of Pérez Galdós from Fortunata y Jacinta onwards, for example in Miau (1888) and his final novel La razón de la sinrazón.

All through his literary career, Pérez Galdós incurred the wrath of the Catholic press. He attacked what he saw as abuses of entrenched and dogmatic religious power rather than religious faith or Christianity per se. In fact, the need for faith is a very important feature in many of his novels and there are many sympathetic portraits of priests and nuns.

== Return to the theatre ==
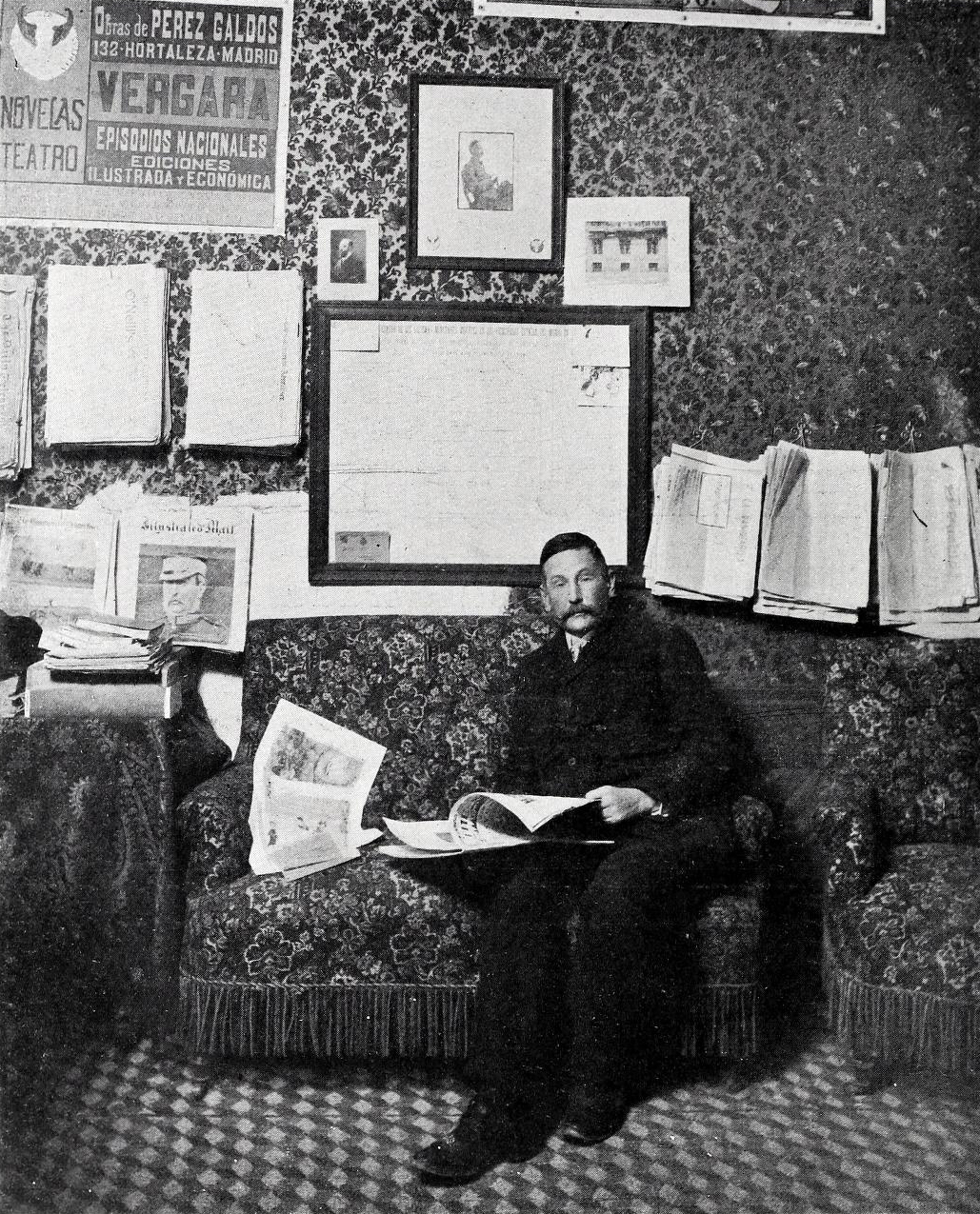
Portrayed in his studio, by Franzen, 1901

Pérez Galdós' first mature play was Realidad, an adaptation of his novel of the same name, which had been written in dialogue. Pérez Galdós was attracted to the idea of making direct contact with the public and seeing and hearing their reactions. Rehearsals began in February 1892. The theatre was packed on the opening night and the play was received enthusiastically. However, the play did not receive universal critical acclaim due to the realism of the dialogue which did not accord with the theatrical norms of the time; and the setting of a scene in the boudoir of a courtesan, and the un-Spanish attitude towards a wife's adultery. The Catholic press denounced the author as a perverse and wicked influence. The play ran for twenty nights.

In 1901, his play Electra caused a storm of outrage and floods of equally hyperbolic enthusiasm. As in many of his works, Pérez Galdós targeted clericalism and the inhuman fanaticism and superstition that can accompany it. The performance was interrupted by audience reaction and the author had to take many curtain calls. After the third night, the conservative and clerical parties organised a demonstration outside the theatre. The police moved in and arrested two members of a workers' organization who had reacted against the demonstration. Several people were wounded as a result of the clash and, the next day, the newspapers were divided between liberal support for the play and Catholic/conservative condemnation. Over one hundred performances were given in Madrid alone and the play was also performed in the provinces. In 1934, 33 years later, a revival in Madrid produced much the same degree of uproar and outrage.

== Later life and political involvement ==
Despite his attacks on the forces of conservatism, Pérez Galdós had shown only a weak interest in being directly involved in politics. In 1886 the Prime Minister Práxedes Mateo Sagasta appointed him as the (absent) deputy for the town and district of Guayama, Puerto Rico at the Madrid parliament; he never visited the place, but had a representative inform him of the status of the area and felt a duty to represent its inhabitants appropriately. This appointment lasted for five years and mainly seems to have given him the chance to observe the conduct of politics at first hand, which informs scenes in some of his novels.

Later, Pérez Galdós was elected as a representative in the cortes of 1907. In 1909, together with Pablo Iglesias, he led the Republican–Socialist Conjunction, although Pérez Galdós, who "did not feel himself a politician", soon withdrew from the struggles "for the minutes and the farce" and turned his already diminished energies to the novel and the theater.

In 1914 Pérez Galdós was elected as republican deputy for Las Palmas de Gran Canaria. This coincided with the promotion, in March 1914, of a national board tribute to Pérez Galdós, made up of personalities as Eduardo Dato (head of the Government), the banker Gustavo Bauer (Rothschild's representative in Spain), Melquiades Álvarez, head of the reformists and the Duke of Alba, as well as writers including Jacinto Benavente, Mariano de Cavia and José de Echegaray. Politicians such as Antonio Maura or Lerroux were not included in the board, nor were representatives of the Church, or the socialists. He had been blind since 1912, was in financial difficulties and increasingly troubled by illness.

Pérez Galdós was nominated for the Nobel Prize in Literature for five years, 1912–16, but neither was successful. Among those who nominated Pérez Galdós was the 1904 winner José Echegaray. So, the 1914 national board was established to raise money to help Pérez Galdós, to which the King and his Prime Minister Romanones were the first to subscribe. The outbreak of World War I led to the scheme being closed in 1916 with the money raised being less than half of what was required to clear his debts. In that same year, however, the ministry of public instruction appointed him to take charge of the arrangements for the Cervantes tercentenary, for a stipend of 1000 pesetas per month. Although the event never took place, the stipend continued for the rest of Pérez Galdós's life.

In 1918, he joined in a protest with Miguel de Unamuno and Mariano de Cavia against the encroaching censorship and authoritarianism coming from the monarch.

In the literary aspect, his admiration for the work of Tolstoy is reflected in a certain spiritualism in his last writings and, in the same Russian line, he could not conceal a certain pessimism for the destiny of Spain, as can be perceived in the pages of one of his last National Episodes, Cánovas (1912):

The two parties that have agreed to take turns peacefully in power are two herds of men who aspire only to graze on the budget. They lack ideals, no lofty goal moves them, they will not improve in the least the living conditions of this unhappy, very poor and illiterate race. They will pass one after the other, leaving everything as it is today, and they will lead Spain to a state of consumption that, for sure, will end in death. They will tackle neither the religious problem, nor the economic problem, nor the educational problem; they will do nothing but pure bureaucracy, caciquism, sterile work of recommendations, favors to cronies, legislating without any practical efficacy, and on with the little lanterns...

— Benito Pérez Galdós, Cánovas, Madrid, 1912

In 1897, Pérez Galdós was elected to the Real Academia Española (Royal Spanish Academy). After becoming blind he continued to dictate his books for the rest of his life. Pérez Galdós died at the age of 76. Shortly before his death, a statue in his honour was unveiled in the Parque del Buen Retiro, the most popular park in Madrid, financed solely by public donations. And a ceremony was held in which Pérez Galdós participated. The writer, now blind, explored the statue's face with his hands and after recognizing it, he began to cry and said to the sculptor, a great friend of his, "Magnificent, my friend Macho, and how it looks like me!

== Works (in Spanish) ==
Early novels

- La Fontana de Oro (1870)
- La Sombra (1871)
- El Audaz (1871)
- Doña Perfecta (1876)
- Gloria (1877)
- Marianela (1878)
- La Familia de León Roch (1878)

Novelas Españolas Contemporáneas

- La Desheredada (1881)
- El Amigo Manso (1882)
- El Doctor Centeno (1883)
- Tormento (1884)
- La de Bringas (1884)
- Lo Prohibido (1884–85)
- Fortunata y Jacinta (1886–87)
- Celín, Tropiquillos y Theros (1887)
- Miau (1888)
- La Incógnita (1889)
- Torquemada en la Hoguera (1889)
- Realidad (1889)
- Ángel Guerra (1891)

Later novels

- Tristana (1892)
- Torquemada en la Cruz (1893)
- La Loca de la Casa (1893)
- Torquemada en el Purgatorio (1894)
- Torquemada y San Pedro (1895)
- Nazarín (1895)
- Halma (1895)
- Misericordia (1897)
- El Abuelo (1897)
- Casandra (1905)
- El Caballero Encantado (1909)
- La Razón de la Sinrazón (1915)

Episodios Nacionales

- Episodios Nacionales

Plays

- Quien Mal Hace, Bien no Espere (1861, lost)
- La Expulsión de los Moriscos (1865, lost)
- Un Joven de Provecho (1867?, published in 1936)
- Realidad (1892)
- La Loca de la Casa (1893)
- Gerona (1893)
- La de San Quintín (1894)
- Los Condenados (1895)
- Voluntad (1896)
- Doña Perfecta (1896)
- La Fiera (1897)
- Electra (1901)
- Alma y Vida (1902)
- Mariucha (1903)
- El Abuelo (1904)
- Barbara (1905)
- Amor y Ciencia (1905)
- Pedro Minio (1908)
- Zaragoza (1908)
- Casandra (1910)
- Celia en los Infiernos (1913)
- Alceste (1914)
- Sor Simona (1915)
- El Tacaño Salomón (1916)
- Santa Juana de Castilla (1918)
- Antón Caballero (1922, unfinished)

Short stories

- Una industria que vive de la muerte. Episodio musical del cólera (1865)
- Necrología de un proto-tipo (1866)
- La conjuración de las palabras. Cuento alegórico (1868)
- El artículo de fondo (1871)
- La mujer del filósofo (1871)
- La novela en el tranvía (1871)
- Un tribunal literario (1872)
- Aquél (1872)
- La pluma en el viento o el viaje de la pluma (1873)
- En un jardín (1876)
- La mula y el buey (1876)
- El verano (1876)
- La princesa y el granuja (1877)
- El mes de junio (1878)
- Theros (1883)
- La tienda-asilo (1886)
- Celín (1889)
- Tropiquillos (1893)
- El Pórtico de la Gloria (1896)
- Rompecabezas (1897)
- Rura (1901)
- Entre copas (1902)
- La república de las letras (1905)

Miscellaneous

- Crónicas de Portugal (1890)
- Discurso de Ingreso en la Real Academia Española (1897)
- Memoranda, Artículos y Cuentos (1906)
- Política Española I (1923)
- Política Española II (1923)
- Arte y Crítica (1923)
- Fisonomías Sociales (1923)
- Nuestro Teatro (1923)
- Cronicón 1883 a 1886 (1924)
- Toledo. Su historia y su Leyenda (1927)
- Viajes y Fantasías (1929)
- Memorias (1930)

== Works translated into English ==
=== In the United Kingdom ===
==== Novels ====
- Gloria (1879. London: Remington and Co. Translated by Natham Wetherell; 1883. Trübner & Co. Translated by Clara Bell)
- Doña Perfecta, a tale of Modern Spain (1886. London: Samuel Tinsley, Translated by D. P. W.)
- Marianela (1893. London: Digby, Long. Translated by Mary Wharton)
- Doña Perfecta (1894. London: The Fisher Unwin. Translated by Mary Wharton; 1999. London: Widenfeld & Nicolson Ltd. Translated by A. K. Tulloch; 2009. Oxford: Oxbow Books. Translated by Graham Whittaker)
- The Spendthrifts [La de Bringas] (1951. London: Weidenfeld & Nicolson. The Illustrated Novel Library. Translated by Gamel Woolsey; 1953. London: Reader's Union. Translated by Gamel Woolsey)
- Torment [Tormento] (1952. London: Widenfeld & Nicolson Ltd. Translated by J. M. Cohen)
- Miau (1963. London: Methuen. Translated by J. M. Cohen)
- Fortunata and Jacinta: Two Stories of Married Women [Fortunata y Jacinta] (1973. Harmondsworth: Penguin Books. Translated by Lester Clarck)
- La desheredada (1976. London: The Folio Society. Translated by Lester Clarck)
- Torquemada on the Fire [Torquemada en la hoguera] (1985. Glasgow: University of Glasgow. Translated by Nicholas Round)
- Fortunata and Jacinta [Fortunata y Jacinta] (1987. London: Viking. Translated by Agnes Moncy Gullón; 1992. Cambridge: Cambridge University Press. Translated by Harriet S. Turner; 1998. London: Penguin Books. Translated by Agnes Moncy Gullón)
- Torquemada (1988. London: André Deutsch. Translated by Frances M. López-Morillas)
- Nazarín (1993. Oxford: Oxford University Press. Translated by Jo Labanyi)
- Misericordia (1995. Santry: Dedalus. Translated by Charles de Salis; 2007. Madrid: Isidora. Revista de Estudios Galdosianos no. 3, pp. 6–293. Translated by Robert H. Russell; 2013. Madrid: Ediciones. Translated by Robert H. Russell)
- That Bringas Woman: The Bringas Family [La de Bringas] (1996. London: Phoenix. Translated by Catherine Jagoe)
- Tristana (1996. London: Bristol Classical Press; 1998. London: Duckworth Publishers; 1998. London: Bloomsbury Publishing; 2016. Manchester: Manchester University Press. Translated by Pablo Valdivia)
- Inferno [Tormento] (1998. London: Phoenix House (Weidenfeld & Nicolson). Translated by Abigail Lee Six)
- Halma (2015. Cambridge: Cambridge Scholars Publishing. Translated by Robert S. Rudder, Ignacio López-Calvo)

==== Episodios Nacionales ====
- Trafalgar (1905/1921/1951. Cambridge: Cambridge University Press. Translated by Frederick Alexander Kirkpatrick)

==== Plays ====
- Meow. A Tragicomedy [Miau] (2014. Liverpool: Aris & Phillips Hispanic Classics. Translated by Ruth Katz Crispin)

==== Short stories ====
- The Conspiracy of Words [La conjuración de las palabras] ( 2007. Madrid: Isidora. Revista de Estudios Galdosianos no. 4, pgs. 165–170. Translated by Robert H. Russell)

=== In the United States ===
==== Novels ====
- Gloria (1882. New York: William S. Gottsberger Publisher. Translated by Clara Bell; 2012. Miami: Editorial Rarebooksclub. Translated by N. Wetherell)
- Doña Perfecta (1884. New York: Gottsberger. Translated by Clara Bell; 1883. New York: George Munro, Publisher. Translated by D. P. W.; 1885. New York: Harper & Brothers Publishers. Translated by Mary jane Serrano; 1940 New York: P. F. Collier & Son; 1960. New York: Barron's Educational Series, Inc. Translated by Harriet de Onís; 2013. Miami: Editorial Rarebooksclub. Translated by D. P. W)
- Marianela (1883. New York: William S. Gottsberger Publisher. Translated by Clara Bell; 2013. Miami: Editorial Rarebooksclub; 2015. Scholar's Choice Publisher. Translated by Mary Wharton)
- La familia de León Roch (1888. New York: William S. Gottsberger Publisher. Translated by Clara Bell)
- Marianela: A Story of Spanish Love [Marianela] (1892. Chicago: A.C. McClurg and Company. Translated by Hellen W. Lester)
- The Spendthrifts [La de Bringas] (1952. New York: Farrar Straus & Young. The Illustrated Novel Library. Translated by Gamel Woolsley; 2013. Miami: Editorial Rarebooksclub)
- Tristana (1961. Peterborough, NH: R. R. Smith. Translated by R. Selden-Rose. 2014. Review Books Classics. New York: ReadHowYouWant. Translated by Margarte Jull Costa)
- Compassion [Misericordia] (1962. New York: Frederick Ungar Publishing Co. Translated by Toby Talbot)
- El amigo Manso (1963. New York: Oxford University Press)
- Miau (1970. New York: Oxford University Press. Translated by Eduard R. Mulvihill, Roberto G. Sánchez)
- León Roch: a Romance [La familia de León Roch] (1974. New York: Howard Ferting. Translated by Clara Bell)
- The Shadow [La sombra] (1980. Ohio: Ohio University Press. Translated by Karen O. Austin)
- Fortunata and Jacinta: Two Stories of Married Women [Fortunata y Jacinta] (1986. Georgia: University of Georgia Press. Translated by Agnes Moncy Gullón)
- Torquemada novels: Torquemada at the Stake – Torquemada on the Cross – Torquemada in Purgatory – Torquemada and Saint Peter [Torquemada en la hoguera. Torquemada en la Cruz. Torquemada en el Purgatorio. Torquemada y San Pedro] (1986. New York: Columbia University Press. Translated by Frances M. López-Morillas)
- The Golden Fountain Café: a Historic Novel of the XIXth Century [La Fontana de Oro] (1989. Pittsburgh, PA: Latin American Literary Review Press. Translated by Walten Rubin et al.)
- Our Friend Manso [El amigo Manso] (1987. New York: Columbia University Press. Translated by Robert Russell)
- Ángel Guerra (1990. Lewiston, New York: Edwin Mellen Press. Translated by Karen O. Austin)
- The Unknown [La incógnita](1991. Lewiston, New York: Edwin Mellen Press. Translated by Karen O. Austin)
- Reality [Realidad] (1992. Lewiston, New York: Edwin Mellen Press. Translated by Karen O. Austin)
- The Cape of Don Francisco Torquemada: 1.Torquemada in the Bonfire. 2. Torquemada on the Cross. 3. Torquemada in Purgatory. 4. Torquemada and Saint Peter [Torquemada en la hoguera. Torquemada en la Cruz. Torquemada en el Purgatorio. Torquemada y San Pedro] (1996. San Bernardino, CA: Borgo Press. Translated by Robert G. Trimble)
- Nazarín (1997. Pittsburgh, PA: Latin American Literary Review Press. Translated by Robert S. Ruder, Gloria Chacón de Arjona)
- Torquemada at the Stake [Torquemada en la hoguera] (2004. Mineola, New York: Dover. Translated by Stanley Appel Baum)
- Dona Perfecta [Doña Perfecta] (2009. ReadHowYouWant Publisher. Easy Read Edition; 2014. United States: Independent Publishing-Platform)
- Halma (2010. Volume 69. Charleston: Nabu Press) (Note: This was a reprint of Spanish Edition, not translation.)
- Misericordia (2017. Miami: Editorial Rarebooksclub)
- Leon Roch: a Romance. Volume 1. [La familia de León Roch] (2018. Franklin Classics Trade Press)

==== Compilations ====
- Benito Pérez Galdós. Best Novels (2017. Miami: Editorial Rarebooksclub. Translated by Mary J. Serrano)

==== Episodios Nacionales ====
- Trafalgar. A Tale (1884. New York: William S. Gottsberger Publisher. Translated by Clara Bell; 1993. New York: H. Fertig)
- The Court of Charles IV. A Romance of the Escorial [La Corte de Carlos IV] (1886. New York: William S. Gottsberger Publisher. Translated by Clara Bell; 1993. New York: H. Fertig)
- La batalla de los Arapiles (1985. Philadelphia: J. B. Lippincott. Translated by R. Ogden)
- Saragossa. A History of Spanish Valor [Zaragoza] (1899. Boston: Little, Brown and Company. Translated by Minna Caroline Smith)
- The Campaign of the Maestrazgo [La campaña del Maestrazgo] (1990. Wakefield. N. H.: Longwood Academic. Translated by Lila Wells Guzmán)
- Gerona (1993. Lewiston, New York: Edwin Mellen Press. Translated by G. J. Racz; 20115. Scholar's Select. Palala Press. Goodreads)
- A Royalist Volunteer [Un voluntario realista] (Lewiston, New York: Edwin Mellen Press. Translated by Lila Wells Guzmán)
- Juan Martin el Empecinado (2009. Charleston: Nabu Press)
- El Grande Oriente (2009. Charleston: Nabu Press)
- Aita Tettuaen (2009. Miami: Editorial Rarebooksclub)
- The Court of Charles IV [La Corte de Carlos IV] (2009. Miami: Editorial Rarebooksclub. Translated by Clara Bell)
- Saragossa [Zaragoza] (2015. Miami: Editorial Rarebooksclub. Translated by Minna Smith)
- Trafalgar (2016. Miami: Editorial Rarebooksclub)

==== Plays ====
- The Grandfather. Drama in five acts [El abuelo] (1910. Boston: Poet Lore XXXI, no. 3. Translated by Elizabeth Wallace; 2017. Miami: Editorial Rarebooksclub)
- Electra (1911. Chicago: The Drama, no. 2, pp. 12–138; 1919. Boston: R. G. Badger in Contemporary Spanish Dramatists. Translated by Charles Alfred Turrell)
- The Duchess of San Quintín, Daniela [La de San Quintín] (1928. New York & London: D. Appleton and Company. Translated by Eleanor Bontecou, P. M. Hayden, J. G. Underhill)
- Marianela (2014. Texas: Stone Cottage Theater. Adapted by Mark-Brian Sonna)
- The Duchess of San Quintín: a play in three acts [La de San Quintín] (2016. Newark: Juan de la Cuesta Cop. Translated by Robert M. Fedorcheck)

== Film adaptations ==
His novels have yielded many cinematic adaptations: Beauty in Chains (Doña Perfecta) was directed by Elsie Jane Wilson in 1918; Viridiana (1961), by Luis Buñuel, is based upon Halma; Buñuel also filmed the adaptations Nazarín (1959) and Tristana (1970); La Duda was filmed in 1972 by Rafael Gil; El Abuelo (1998) (The Grandfather), by José Luis Garci, was internationally released a year later; it had previously been adapted as the Argentine film El Abuelo (1954). In 2018, Sri Lankan director Bennett Rathnayke directed the film adaptation Nela.

== Works about Pérez Galdós ==
- Alfieri, J.J. (1968). "Galdós Revaluated (sic)" Books Abroad, Vol. 42, No. 2, pp. 225–226.
- Bishop, William Henry (1917). "Benito Pérez Galdós." In: The Warner Library. New York: Knickerbocker Press, pp. 6153–6163.
- Chamberlin, Vernon A. (1964). "Galdós' Use of Yellow in Character Delineation," PMLA, Vol. 79, No. 1, pp. 158–163.
- Ellis, Havelock (1906). "The Spirit of Present Day Spain," The Atlantic Monthly, Vol. 98, pp. 757–765.
- Geddes Jr., James (1910). "Introduction." In: Marianela. Boston: D.C. Heath & Co., pp. iii–xvi.
- Glascock, C.C. (1923). "Spánish Novelist: Benito Perez Galdos," Texas Review, Vol. 8, No. 2, pp. 158–177.
- Gómez Martínez, José Luis (1983). "Galdós y el Krausismo español" Nueva Revista de Filología Hispánica, Vol. 22, No. 1, pp. 55–79.
- Huntington, Archer M. (1897). "Perez Galdós in the Spanish Academy," The Bookman, Vol. V, pp. 220–222.
- Karimi, Kian-Harald (2007): Jenseits von altem Gott und 'Neuem Menschen'. Präsenz und Entzug des Göttlichen im Diskurs der spanischen Restaurationsepoche. Frankf./M.: Vervuert. ISBN 3-86527-313-0
- Keniston, Hayward (1920). "Galdós, Interpreter of Life," Hispania, Vol. 3, No. 4, pp. 203–206.
- Madariaga, Salvador de (1920). "The Genius of Spain," Contemporary Review, Vol. 117, pp. 508–516.
- Miller, W. (1901). "The Novels of Pérez Galdós," The Gentleman's Magazine, Vol. 291, pp. 217–228.
- Pattison, Walter T. (1954). Benito Pérez Galdós and the Creative Process. Minneapolis: University of Minnesota Press.
- Ridao Carlini, Inma (2018): Rich and Poor in Nineteenth-Century Spain: A Critique of Liberal Society in the Later Novels of Benito Pérez Galdós. Woodbridge: Boydell & Brewer. ISBN 978-1-85566-330-5
- Waldeck, R.W. (1904). "Benito Pérez Galdós, Novelist, Dramatist and Reformer" The Critic, Vol. 45, No. 5, pp. 447–449.
- Warshaw, J. (1929). "Galdós's Apprenticeship in the Drama," Modern Language Notes, Vol. 44, No. 7, pp. 459–463.

== Pérez Galdós museum ==
The Pérez Galdós museum (Casa-Museo Pérez Galdós in Spanish) is located in Triana, in the centre of Las Palmas de Gran Canaria. The house where Pérez Galdós was born was acquired in 1954 by the cabildo de Gran Canaria, and inaugurated on 9 July 1960 by María Pérez Galdós Cobián, the writer's daughter.

In the museum visitors can see the house where the writer grew up, as well as a display of documents, furniture, musical instruments, paintings and photos that belonged to the writer and his family. The aim of the museum is the conservation, study and dissemination of the legacy of Pérez Galdós. The management of the museum has supported international congresses, conferences and exhibitions, and has developed a publishing line. The museum also has a library with numerous works by Pérez Galdós in different languages, as well as the author's complete collection.

== Sources ==
- Berkowitz, H, Chonon (1948). Perez Galdos, Spanish Liberal Crusader. Madison: University of Wisconsin Press.
- Montesinos, Jose (1968–71). Galdos. Madrid.
- Montesinos, Jose (1971). Intro to Lo Prohibido. Madrid: Editorial Castalia. ISBN 84-7039-106-2.
