= Silvia Pinal on screen and stage =

Filmography

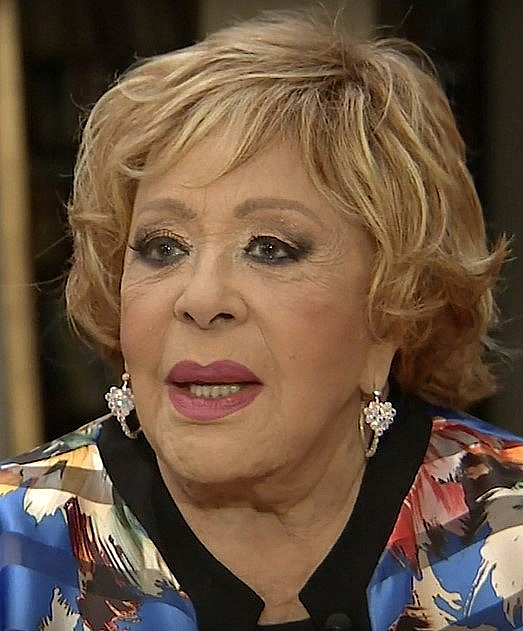
Pinal in 2019

Silvia Pinal Hidalgo (12 September 1931 – 28 November 2024) was a Mexican actress. She began her career in theatre before venturing into cinema in 1949. She was one of the greatest female stars from the Golden Age of Mexican cinema and, with her performance in Shark! (1969), part of the Golden Age of Hollywood. Pinal achieved international recognition by starring in a trilogy of films directed by Luis Buñuel: Viridiana (1961), El ángel exterminador (1962) and Simón del desierto (1965).

In addition to her film career, Pinal was a pioneer in Mexican musical theatre. She was considered "the last diva" of the Golden Age of Mexican film.

== Performances ==
=== Films ===
- La tercera llamada (2013) Actors' Guild secretary
- El agente 00-P2 (2009) as Mamá Osa (voice)
- Ya no los hacen como antes (2003) as Genoveva Reyer
- Puppy-Go-Round (1996)
- Modelo antiguo (1992) as Carmen Rivadeneira
- Pubis angelical (1982) as Beatriz
- Dos y dos, cinco (1981) as Julia
- Carlota: Amor es... veneno (1981) as Carlota Cavendish
- El canto de la cigarra (1980) as Elisa
- El niño de su mamá (1980) as Tina
- Las mariposas disecadas (1978)
- Divinas palabras (1977) as Mari Gaila
- Los cacos (1972)
- ¡Cómo hay gente sinvergüenza! (1972)
- La güera Xóchitl (1971) as Xóchitl Torres
- Secreto de confesión (1971)
- Bang Bang (1971) as Doliente
- Caín, Abel y el otro (1971)
- Los novios (1971) as Irene
- La mujer de oro (1970) as Silvia Torres
- La Hermana Trinquete (1970)
- El cuerpazo del delito (1970) as Magda Bustamante/Enriqueta (segment "La insaciable")
- El amor de María Isabel (1970) as María Isabel Sánchez
- El despertar del lobo (1970) as Kim Jones
- Shark! (1969) as Anna
- 24 horas de placer (1969) as Catalina
- María Isabel (1968) as María Isabel Sánchez
- La bataille de San Sebastian (1968) as Felicia
- La soldadera (1967) as Lázara
- Juego peligroso (1967) as Lena Anderson (segment "Divertimento")
- Estrategia matrimonial (1967)
- Los cuervos están de luto (1965)
- Simón del desierto (1965) as The Devil
- Buenas noches, año nuevo (1964)
- El ángel exterminador (1962) as Leticia 'La Valkiria'
- Adiós, Mimí Pompón (1961)
- Viridiana (1961) as Viridiana
- Maribel y la extraña familia (1960)
- Charlestón (1959)
- Las locuras de Bárbara (1959)
- Uomini e nobiluomini (1959) as Giovanna
- El hombre que me gusta (1958) as Marta
- Una golfa (1958)
- Una cita de amor (1958)
- Préstame tu cuerpo (1958) as Leonor Rivas Conde/Regina Salsamendi
- ¡Viva el amor! (1958) as Verónica de la Maza
- Desnúdate, Lucrecia (1958)
- Mi desconocida esposa (1958)
- Dios no lo quiera (1957) as Felisa
- Cabo de Hornos (1957)
- La dulce enemiga (1957) as Lucrecia
- Teatro del crimen (1957)
- La adúltera (1956) as Irene
- El inocente (1956) as Mané
- Locura pasional (1956) as Mabel Mendoza
- La vida tiene tres días (1955) as María Andrade
- Amor en cuatro tiempos (1955) as Silvia
- La sospechosa (1955) as Regina de Alba
- Historia de un abrigo de mink (1955) as Margot
- Pecado mortal (1955) as Soledad Hernández
- Un extraño en la escalera (1955)
- Vendedor de muñecas (1955)
- Si volvieras a mí (1954) as Lidia Kane
- El casto Susano (1954) as Mimí
- Hijas casaderas (1954) as Magdalena
- Reventa de esclavas (1954) as Alicia Sandoval/Isis de Alejandría
- Las cariñosas (1953) as Carmen Santibañes
- Yo soy muy macho (1953) as María Aguirre
- Mis tres viudas alegres (1953) as Silvia
- Doña Mariquita de mi corazón (1953) as Paz Alegre
- Sí... mi vida (1953)
- Me traes de un ala (1953) as Rosita Alba Vírez
- Cuando los hijos pecan (1952) as Tencha
- Ahora soy rico (1952) as Sonia Iliana
- Un rincón cerca del cielo (1952) as Sonia Iliana
- Por ellas aunque mal paguen (1952)
- Mujer de medianoche (1952)
- La estatua de carne (1951) as Marta
- Recién casados... no molestar (1951) as Gaby
- Una gallega baila mambo (1951) as Carmina
- El amor no es negocio (1950) as Malena
- El amor no es ciego (1950)
- Azahares para tu boda (1950) as Tota
- La marca del zorrillo (1950)
- El portero (1950)
- El rey del barrio (1950)
- La mujer que yo perdí (1949) as Laura
- Escuela para casadas (1949) as Teresa Moreno
- Bamba (1949)
- El pecado de Laura (1949) as Juanita

=== Television ===
- Juntos el corazón nunca se equivoca (2019) as Doña Imelda Sierra Vda. de Córcega
- Silvia Pinal, frente a ti (2019) as Herself
- Mi marido tiene familia (2017–2019) as Doña Imelda Sierra Vda. de Córcega
- Soy tu dueña (2010) as Isabel Rangel Vda. de Dorantes
- Fuego en la sangre (2008) as Santa Margarita Lorenza Vda. de Gómez
- Una familia de diez (2007–2019) as Herself
- Amor sin maquillaje (2007) as Herself
- Aventuras en el tiempo (2001) as Silvia
- Carita de ángel (2000–2001) as Mother Lucía
- El privilegio de amar (1998)
- Lazos de amor (1995) as Herself
- Mujer, casos de la vida real (1986–2007) as Host
- Eclipse (1984)* Mañana es primavera (1983) as Amanda González de Serrano
- ¿Quién? (1973)
- Los caudillos (1968) as Jimena

=== Stage ===
- A Midsummer Night's Dream (1947)
- Los caprichos de Goya (1947)
- Nuestra Natacha (1948)
- Un sueño de cristal (1949)
- Fausto y Margarita (1949)
- Cuarto para vivir (1950)
- La familia Barret (1950)
- Celos del Aire (1950)
- Don Juan Tenorio (1950)
- El cuadrante de la soledad (1950)
- Historia de una escalera (1950)
- The Madwoman of Chaillot (1950)
- Divorciémonos (1951)
- La Sed (1954)
- Anna Christie (1955)
- Desnúdate, Lucrecia (1957)
- Two for the Seesaw (1957)
- Bells Are Ringing (1958)
- Irma La Douce (1964)
- Cualquier miércoles (1965)
- Mame (1972, 1985, 1989)
- Vidas privadas (1975)
- Annie Get Your Gun (1976)
- ¡Felicidades Silvia! (1977)
- El año próximo a la misma hora (1978)
- Plaza Suite (1978)
- La libélula (1983)
- La señorita de Tacna (1985)
- Las memorias de la Divina Sarah (1985)
- Anna Karenina (1986)
- Vamos a contar mentiras (1989)
- Lettice and Lovage (1991)
- Hello Dolly! (1996)
- Gypsy (1998)
- Debiera haber obispas (2005)
- Adorables enemigas (2008)
- Amor, dolor y lo que traía puesto (2012)

== Producer ==
=== Stage ===
- A Chorus Line (1989)
- Cats (1991)
- La Cage aux Folles (1993)
