= List of awards and nominations received by Silvia Pinal =

Silvia Pinal awards and nominations
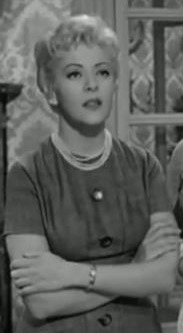
- Silvia Pinal in the Italian film, Uomini e nobiluomini (1959)
Awards and nominations
Award	Wins	Nominations
Ariel Awards	4	4
Association of Latin Entertainment Critics	2	2
Diosas de Plata	6	6
GLAAD Media Award	0	1
Premios TVyNovelas	10	11

Totals (Note: Certain award groups do not simply award one winner. They acknowledge several different recipients, have runners-up, and have third place. Since this is a specific recognition and is different from losing an award, runner-up mentions are considered wins in this award tally. For simplification and to avoid errors, each award in this list has been presumed to have had a prior nomination.)
- Wins: 68
- Nominations: 73

Silvia Pinal (1931–2024) was a Mexican actress, recipient of various accolades in film, television and theater. In her life, spanning 8 decades in media (1950s-2020s), she won an estimated 150 national and international awards. She was referred as "the last diva" of the Golden Age of Mexican Cinema. She also had movies in the Golden Age of Hollywood, and in Europe. The film Viridiana (1961) made her an international cinema icon. The movie won the Palme d'Or at the 1961 Cannes Film Festival, becoming the only Spanish-language film winner of a Palme d'Or, and credited with boosting the Cinema of Mexico in that era. Her anthology telenovela Mujer, Casos de la Vida Real (1986–2007) also achieved recognition.

Silvia Pinal won various Ariel Award and Premios TVyNovelas, highest awards in Mexican cinema and telenovelas, respectively, including the Golden Ariel—highest award for a Mexican actor. She also won awards in regions such as Argentina, Italy, and Cuba, and various other Mexican accolades, including El Heraldo de México Awards, Diosas de Plata and Zarape de Plata. In addition, Silvia received multiple tributes in life and posthumously by the Government of Mexico, Palacio de Bellas Artes in Mexico, the Mexican Postal Service as well by organizations and critic's associations, including Berlin International Film Festival in 2018. She is represented as one of the seven muses of Teatro Xicohténcatl. She also became part of the Golden Book (Libro de Oro) by the Mexican Film Journalists Association (PECIME). In 2024, secretary of Government of Mexico declared her as a "Transcendental figure in the cultural history of our country".

Pinal also received recognition for her womanhood, receiving the national medal Woman of the Year in 1999. She was named one of the best-known Mexican women figures along with Thalía and Dolores Ayala in a poll conducted in 2007, and The Bicentennial Woman in Veracruz, in 2010. In 2016, she became the first Mexican actor member of the Academy of Motion Picture Arts and Sciences. She was the president of the Asociación Nacional de Intérpretes (1988–1995), National Association of Actors (2010–2014), and the Asociación Rafael Banquels, as well founder of Premios Bravo (established in 1991) from the same organization.

== Awards and nominations ==
Award/organization	Year	Nominee/work	Category	Result	Ref.
Academia Mexicana del Humor	1996	Silvia Pinal	Lifetime Award	Honoree	
Ariel Awards	1953	Silvia Pinal (A Place Near Heaven)	Best Supporting Actress	Won	
Ariel Awards	1955	Silvia Pinal (Locura pasional)	Best Actress	Won	
Ariel Awards	1957	Silvia Pinal (La Dulce Enemiga)	Best Actress	Won	
Ariel Awards	2007	Silvia Pinal	Golden Ariel	Honoree	
Agrupación de Críticos y Periodistas de Teatro (ACPT)	1997	Silvia Pinal	Special Recognition	Honoree	
Agrupación de Críticos y Periodistas de Teatro (ACPT)	2008	Silvia Pinal (Adorables enemigas)	Best Actress — Comedy	Won	
Agrupación de Profesionales en Relaciones Públicas y Periodismo (APREPP)	1995	Silvia Pinal (Hello, Dolly!)	Best Actress	Won	
Agrupación de Periodistas Teatrales (APT)	2011	Silvia Pinal	Gran Premio de Honor	Honoree	
Association of Latin Entertainment Critics (Latin ACE)	1979	Silvia Pinal (Las Mariposas Disecadas)	Best Actress	Won	
Association of Latin Entertainment Critics (Latin ACE)	1994	Silvia Pinal	Extraordinary ACE for Distinction and Merit	Honoree	
Bravo Awards	2018	Silvia Pinal (Mi marido tiene familia)	Best Leading Actress	Won	
Brownsville Chamber of Commerce	1999	Silvia Pinal	Mr. Amigo (Note: A collaborative effort by cities of Brownsvile, Texas, and Matamoros, Tamaulipas established in 1964 to honor Mexican figures in sports, politics, business, cultural and arts)	Honoree	
Diosas de Plata	1965	Silvia Pinal	For her work internationally	Won	
Diosas de Plata	1966	Silvia Pinal (Los Cuervos Están de Luto)	Best Actress	Won	
Diosas de Plata	1978	Silvia Pinal (Divinas Palabras)	Best Actress	Won	
Diosas de Plata	1995	Silvia Pinal	Carlos Bravo "Carhilos" Award	Honoree	
Diosas de Plata	1998	Silvia Pinal	Career Achievement Award	Honoree	
Diosas de Plata	2009	Silvia Pinal	Honorary Award	Honoree	
Encuentro Latinoamericano de Cine	1997	Silvia Pinal	Lifetime Award	Honoree	
Festival de Cine Español en México (CINE.ES, Nextel)	2008	Silvia Pinal	Lifetime Award	Honoree	
Festival Internacional de Cine de Acapulco (FICA)	2014	Silvia Pinal	Jaguar de Plata	Honoree	
Festival Internacional de Cine de Huesca	2000	Silvia Pinal	Luis Buñuel Award	Honoree	
Festival Internacional de Cine de Monterrey	2010	Silvia Pinal	Icon of Mexican Cinema (Cabrito de Cristal Award)	Honoree	
Festival Internacional de Cine Xilitla (FICXILITLA)	2024	Silvia Pinal	Career Achievement Award in Mexican Film Industry	Honoree	
Festival Internacional de Málaga	2009	Silvia Pinal	Premio de Oro (Gold Award)	Gold	
Festival Latino de Nueva York	1993	Silvia Pinal	Special Award	Honoree	
GLAAD Media Award	2006	Mujer, Casos de la Vida Real	Outstanding Individual Episode — in a Series Without a Regular Gay Character	Nominated	
Guild of Entertainment Journalists	2021	Silvia Pinal	Gold Medal Silvia Pinal	Gold	
Guadalajara International Film Festival	~2003	Silvia Pinal	Silver Mayahuel	Honoree	
Guadalajara International Film Festival	2013	Silvia Pinal (Tercera Llamada)	Best Actress	Won	
Instituto Nacional de Bellas Artes y Literatura	2022	Silvia Pinal	Gold Medal: Bellas Artes	Gold	
Instituto Nacional de Mercadotecnia (INAME)		Silvia Pinal	Most Popular Woman	Won	
Las Vegas Walk of Stars Committee	2022	Silvia Pinal	Diamond Award	Honoree	
Las Vegas Walk of Stars Committee	2022	Silvia Pinal	Commemorative Medal	Honoree	
Las Vegas Walk of Stars Committee	2022	Silvia Pinal	Las Vegas Keys to the City	Honoree	
Metropolitan Theatre Awards	2022	Silvia Pinal	Lifetime Award	Honoree	
National Association of Actors (ANDA)	2000	Silvia Pinal	Gold Medal	Gold	
Order of Isabella the Catholic	2006	Silvia Pinal	Encomienda	Honoree	
Plaza de las Estrellas	2024	Silvia Pinal	Walk of Star	Won	
Premios Eres	1993	La Jaula de las Locas	Best Play	Won	
Premios Pedro Sarquis Merrewe	2006	Silvia Pinal	Career Achievement Award	Honoree	
Premios TVyNovelas	1983	Silvia Pinal (Mañana es primavera)	Best Actress	Won	
Premios TVyNovelas	1991	Mujer, Casos de la Vida Real	Best Series Airing for 5 Consecutive Years in Mexico	Won	
Premios TVyNovelas	1997	Mujer, Casos de la Vida Real	Best Teletheater Program with Social Content	Won	
Premios TVyNovelas	1999	Mujer, Casos de la Vida Real	Best Melodramatic Show	Won	
Premios TVyNovelas	2000	Mujer, Casos de la Vida Real	Best Melodramatic Show	Won	
Premios TVyNovelas	2001	Mujer, Casos de la Vida Real	Best Melodramatic Show	Won	
Premios TVyNovelas	2002	Mujer, Casos de la Vida Real	Best Melodramatic Show	Won	
Premios TVyNovelas	2007	Mujer, Casos de la Vida Real	Special Award	Honoree	
Premios TVyNovelas	2011	Soy tu dueña	Best Leading Actress	Nominated	
Premios TVyNovelas	2012	Silvia Pinal	A Lifetime in Telenovelas	Honoree	
Premios TVyNovelas	2018	Mi marido tiene familia	Best Leading Actress	Won	
Reforma	1999	Silvia Pinal	Female Figure of the Century	Nominated	
Reforma	1999	Silvia Pinal	Best Theater Actress of the Century	Nominated	
Reforma	1999	Silvia Pinal	Best Film Actress of the Century	Nominated	
TV Adicto Golden Awards	2019	Silvia Pinal (Mi marido tiene familia)	Best Leading Actress	Won	
TV Adicto Golden Awards	2020	Silvia Pinal (This Is Silvia Pinal)	Best Female Special Performance	Won	

== Other honors ==
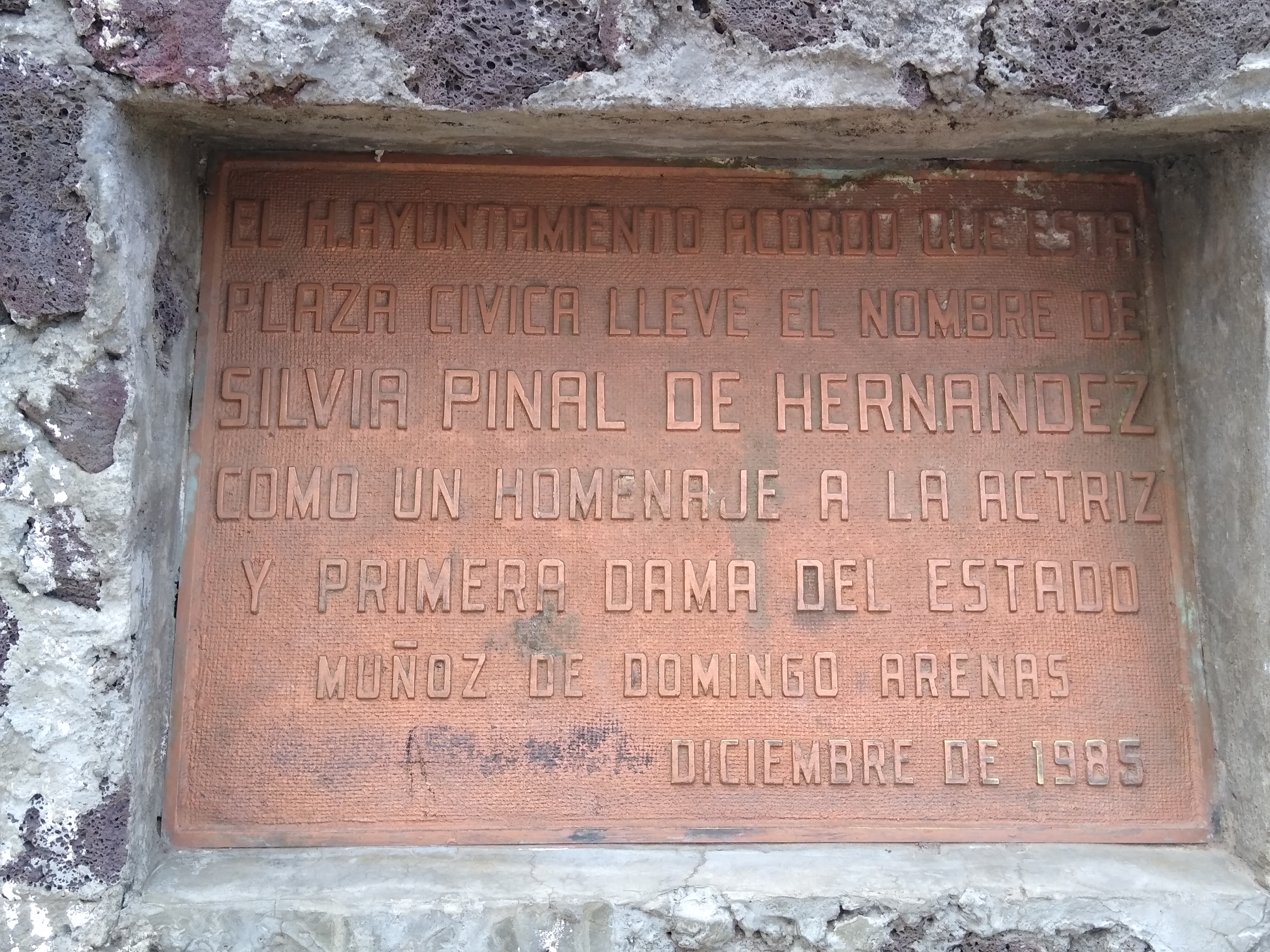
A plaque dedicated to Silvia Pinal in, Tlaxcala, Mexico

List of state honors
Country	City/Gov./Entity	Year	Description	Status	Ref.
Mexico	President of Mexico	1999	Medal Woman of the Year	Honoree	
Mexico	Cosamaloapan City Council, Veracruz	2009	Veracruz Medal of Merit	Honoree	
Mexico	Cosamaloapan City Council, Veracruz	2009	Woman of the Year	Honoree	
Mexico	Cosamaloapan City Council, Veracruz	2009	Distinguished Visitor	Honoree	
Mexico	Cosamaloapan City Council, Veracruz	2009	Keys to the City	Honoree	
Mexico	Cosamaloapan City Council, Veracruz	2009	Honorary Ambassador of La Cuenca	Honoree	
Mexico	Municipality of Tihuatlán/Mayor José Luis Rodríguez Rivera	2010	Keys to the City	Honoree	
Mexico	Government of Veracruz/Governor Fidel Herrera Beltrán	2010	The Bicentennial Woman	Honoree	
Mexico	Government of Veracruz/Governor Fidel Herrera Beltrán	2010	Medal: Silvia Pinal, Máxima Estrella del Centenario (Maximum Star of the Centennial)	Honoree	
Mexico	Taxco City, Guerrero / Mayor Salomón Majul González	2014	Keys to the City	Honoree	
Mexico	Cuernavaca, Morelos / Mayor Cuauhtémoc Blanco Bravo	2017	Special Recognition	Honoree	
United States	Nevada Senate	2022	Silvia Pinal's Day (March 3)	Honoree	
Mexico	Government of Mexico	2023	"México en tus manos" Award	Honoree	
Mexico	Secretariat of Tourism	2023	Special Recognition	Honoree	
Mexico	Cuauhtémoc, Mexico City / Mayor Sandra Cuevas	2023	Alas de la Cuauhtémoc Award	Honoree	

Year	Description	Ref.
2009	Plaque of 2,250 episodes (Mujer, Casos de la Vida Real)	
