= Tristana =

Tristana may refer to:

- Tristana (novel), a novel published in 1892 by Benito Pérez Galdós
  - Tristana (film), a 1970 Spanish film directed by Luis Buñuel based on the eponymous novel
- Tristana (song), a 1987 song recorded by the French artist Mylène Farmer
- Tristana, The Yordle Gunner, a playable champion character from the video game League of Legends

== See also ==
- Tristan (disambiguation)
