= Quién =

- Quién is a Spanish pronoun meaning "who" or "whom" and may refer to:
- "Quién" (Ricardo Arjona song), 2007
- "Quién" (Pablo Alborán song), 2012
- ¿Quién? (TV series), 1973 Televisa telenovela
- ¿Quién? (album), 1974 album by Mari Trini
