= Silvia Pinal =

Mexican actress (1931–2024)

The Most Illustrious Silvia Pinal
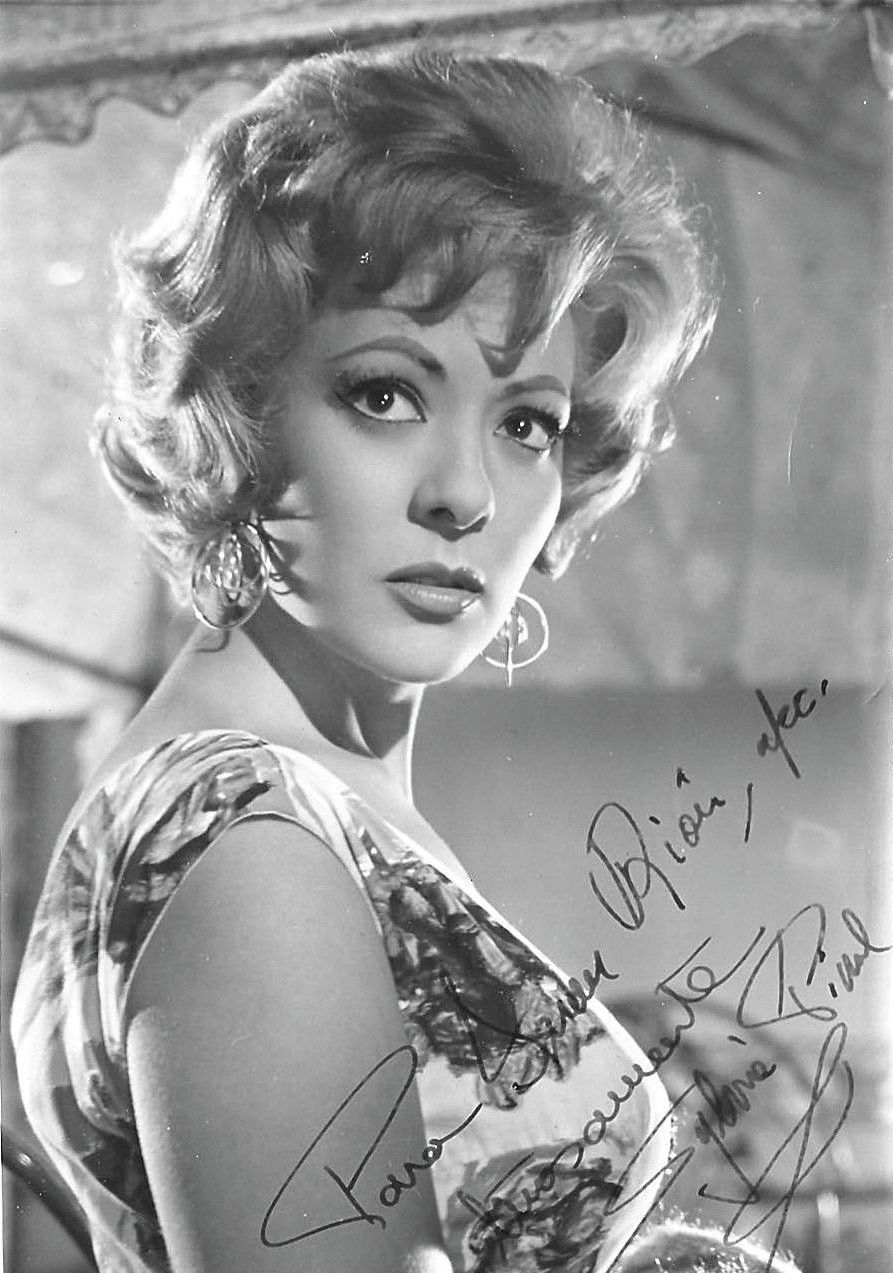
- Pinal in Maribel y la extraña familia (1960)
- Born: Silvia Pinal Hidalgo; 12 September 1931; Guaymas, Sonora, Mexico
- Died: 28 November 2024 (aged 93); Tlalpan, Mexico City, Mexico
- Resting place: Panteón Jardín
- Education: National Institute of Fine Arts and Literature
- Occupations: Actress; singer; stage and television producer; politician
- Years active: 1949–2022
- Political party: Institutional Revolutionary Party (PRI)
- Spouses: Rafael Banquells (m. 1947; div. 1952); Gustavo Alatriste (m. 1961; div. 1967); Enrique Guzmán (m. 1967; div. 1976); Tulio Hernández (m. 1982; div. 1995)
- Children: 4, including: Sylvia Pasquel; Viridiana Alatriste; Alejandra Guzmán
- Family: Stephanie Salas (granddaughter); Frida Sofía (granddaughter)
- Awards: Full list

Senator
- In office 1997–2000

Federal deputy
- In office 1 September 1991 – 31 August 1994
- Constituency: Mexico City's 27th district

Silvia Pinal Hidalgo (Note: Spanish pronunciation: [ˈsilβia piˈnal iˈðalɣo]) (12 September 1931 – 28 November 2024) was a Mexican actress and politician. She began her career in theatre before venturing into cinema in 1949. She became one of the greatest female stars of the Golden Age of Mexican cinema and, with her performance in Shark! (1969), part of the Golden Age of Hollywood. Her work in film and popularity in her native country led Pinal to work in Europe, particularly in Spain and Italy. Pinal achieved international recognition by starring in a trilogy of films directed by Luis Buñuel: Viridiana (1961), The Exterminating Angel (1962) and Simon of the Desert (1965).

In addition to her film career, Pinal pioneered musical theatre in Mexico, had a successful career in television, and held a series of public roles and political offices, including First Lady of Tlaxcala in the 1980s and elected terms in the Chamber of Deputies, the Assembly of Representatives of the Federal District, and the Senate of the Republic. She was considered "the last diva" of the Golden Age of Mexican film.

== Early life ==
Silvia Pinal Hidalgo was born in Guaymas, Sonora, on 12 September 1931. Her parents were María Luisa Hidalgo Aguilar and Moisés Pasquel. Pasquel was an orchestra conductor at radio station XEW by whom Hidalgo Aguilar became pregnant when she was 15 years old. Her father did not acknowledge Pinal as his child, and she did not know him until she was 11 years old. Her biological father sired three more children: Eugenio, Moisés, and Virginia. However, Pinal never spent time with the Pasquel family. Pinal spent her first years behind the counter of a seafood restaurant near XEW, where her mother worked. When she was five years old, her mother married Luis G. Pinal, a journalist, military man, and politician 20 years her senior. Pinal subsequently adopted Silvia as his daughter and, in later interviews, she described Pinal as her only father. Pinal also had three daughters from a previous marriage: Mercedes, Beatriz and Eugenia. Luis Pinal held several public positions, including serving as the municipal president of Tequisquiapan, Querétaro.

Pinal had an interest in show business since she was a child. In addition to film and music, she liked to write and recite poems. She studied first at Pestalozzi College in Cuernavaca and then at the Washington Institute in Mexico City. Despite her artistic aspirations, her father cautioned her to look for "something useful", so she learned to type. At age 14, she began working as a secretary at Kodak.

Pinal went to study opera and began preparing by taking classes, first with a private teacher and then with Professor Reyes Retana. Her first step toward fame occurred when she was invited to participate in a beauty pageant. In this contest, Pinal obtained the title of Student Princess of Mexico. At her coronation, she met the actors Rubén Rojo and Manolo Fábregas, with whom she became close friends. While studying bel canto, Pinal went to work as a secretary in the pharmaceutical laboratories of Carlos Stein. At the music academy, Pinal auditioned for a role in the opera La Traviata. However, the audition was a failure. A teacher encouraged her to take acting courses at the Instituto Nacional de Bellas Artes (INBA), where she was a classmate of figures such as Carlos Pellicer, Salvador Novo and Xavier Villaurrutia. She debuted as an extra in a performance of Shakespeare's A Midsummer Night's Dream.

== Career ==
=== Beginning ===
Pinal continued working in the advertising department of a pharmaceutical products firm. Aware that she was studying acting, her boss allowed her to participate in recording radio comedies for the station XEQ. She debuted in the comedy Dos pesos la dejada.

At the radio station, Pinal met publicists who invited her to join an experimental company. With that company, she debuted in the play Los caprichos de Goya. The director of this work was the Cuban-Mexican actor and director Rafael Banquells, with whom Pinal began an employment relationship and a close friendship that led to romance. Banquells got Carlos Laverne to allow them to use Mexico City's Ideal Theater for their productions. Laverne chose Pinal to participate in a montage with the company of the Ideal Theater, directed by the Spanish actress Isabelita Blanch. The work was called Nuestra Natacha. Pinal acted in numerous productions for this company. Her first starring role was in Un sueño de cristal.

=== Film ===
Just fifteen days after she debuted in the theater, Pinal made her debut in the cinema with a brief role in Bamba (1949), starring Carmen Montejo and directed by Miguel Contreras Torres. Contreras Torres had seen her work at the Ideal Theatre and invited her to participate in the project. Contreras Torres was a demanding, strict director who made Pinal suffer for her inexperience. That same year, she performed in the film El pecado de Laura, directed by Julián Soler and starring Meche Barba. In that film, she worked for the first time in cinema with Rafael Banquells, who had become her husband. Immediately, she played another small role in the movie Escuela para casadas, by Miguel Zacarías. Pinal met and worked for the first time with the actor and singer Pedro Infante in the film La mujer que yo perdí. The actor and comedian Cantinflas (a close personal friend) chose Pinal as his co-star in El portero (1950). Her breakthrough participation was in the comedy El rey del barrio (1949), co-starring with Germán Valdés "Tin Tan", directed by Gilberto Martínez Solares. Pinal and Tin Tan acted together in two more films: La marca del zorrillo (1950) and Me traes de un ala (1952).

Pinal won her first Silver Ariel as a supporting actress for her performance in the film Un rincón cerca del cielo (1952), where she worked again with Infante. In 1952, she performed with Joaquín Pardavé in the comedies Doña Mariquita de mi corazón and El casto Susano. In 1953, Pinal got her first starring roles in the films Reventa de esclavas (1953) and Yo soy muy macho (1953). In that same year, she performed in the musical film Mis tres viudas alegres, where she shared credits with Lilia del Valle and the Cuban rumba dancer Amalia Aguilar. They also starred in the comedy Las cariñosas. That same year, she acted with Libertad Lamarque in Si volvieras a mí.

Pinal gained success and recognition in 1954 after appearing in the film Un extraño en la escalera, directed by Tulio Demicheli, where she starred alongside Arturo de Córdova. Initially, de Córdova preferred either the Italian actress Gina Lollobrigida or the Cuban rumba dancer Rosa Carmina as his co-stars, due to his reservations about Pinal's youth. With the support of the producer Gregorio Walerstein, Pinal transformed her image, emphasizing her sex appeal, which ultimately led to de Córdova's approval for the role. The movie became a major success, solidifying Pinal's status as a leading film actress.

Another director who effectively utilized Pinal's acting skills was Alberto Gout. Under his direction, Pinal starred in La sospechosa (1954). Pinal participated in Historia de un abrigo de mink (1954), a film in which Pinal co-starred with actresses María Elena Marqués, Columba Domínguez and Irasema Dilián. With Tito Davison as director, Pinal also filmed the Mexican-Spanish-Chilean co-production Cabo de Hornos (1955), along with the actor Jorge Mistral. Pinal worked again with Pedro Infante as his co-star in the celebrated comedy El inocente (1955). Pinal starred in several films by Demicheli, including Locura pasional (1955), which would bring her first Silver Ariel Award as best actress. Her second was thanks to her role in the film La dulce enemiga (1957), directed by Davison. In 1956, Pinal starred in Una cita de amor (1956), where she worked under the direction of Emilio Fernández.

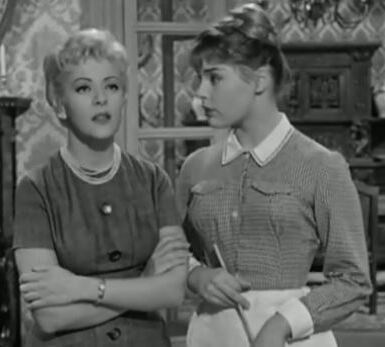
Pinal with Elke Sommer in Uomini e Nobiluomini (1959)

Pinal's popularity and success in Mexico paved the way for her to work in Europe, following the advice of Demicheli. Her first project was the Spanish-Mexican co-production Las locuras de Bárbara (1958), directed by Demicheli. Under his direction, she also starred in the Spanish musical film Charlestón. Given the success of her films in Europe, Pinal was invited to work in Italy, co-starring with Vittorio de Sica and Elke Sommer in the film Uomini e Nobiluomini (1959). Under the direction of José María Forqué, Pinal starred in the Spanish film Maribel y la extraña familia (1960). In 1961, she filmed the Spanish musical film Adiós, Mimí Pompom, along with Fernando Fernán Gómez.

Pinal had her first contact with Luis Buñuel through Mexican actor Ernesto Alonso, with the firm intention of starring in the film version of Pérez Galdós's novel Tristana in the 1950s. However, the limited commercial success of Buñuel's films prevented the producers from financing the project. By the end of the 1960s, Buñuel shot the film in Spain with Catherine Deneuve instead. Years later, Pinal, with the help of her second husband, producer Gustavo Alatriste, looked for Buñuel in Spain and convinced him to film Viridiana (1961), also loosely based on a Pérez Galdós novel. It was the winner of the Palme d'Or at the Cannes Film Festival. Despite the success and prestige enjoyed by the film, it was rejected by the Spanish censorship board (Spain was under the Franco dictatorship) and the Vatican at the time, who described the film as blasphemous. The film was saved through Pinal's intervention, when she fled to Mexico with a copy. The Vatican censorship also resonated in Mexico, but with the help of Salvador Novo, the film had a limited release.

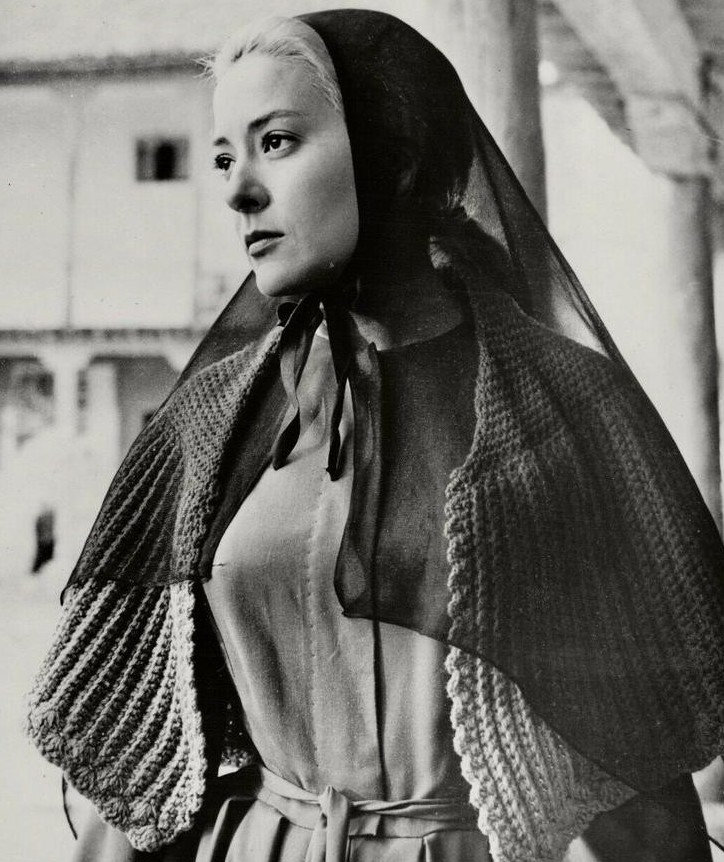
Pinal in the title role of Viridiana (1961)

Pinal achieved international acclaim through a trilogy. Her second film with Buñuel was El ángel exterminador (1962), in which Pinal starred with a choral cast. The film also received critical acclaim worldwide. In 2004, The New York Times recognized it among the best films ever. Her third and last project with Buñuel was Simón del desierto (1964). The film, misrepresented as a medium-length feature, was initially conceived as an episodic film. Pinal and Gustavo Alatriste looked for Federico Fellini to direct a second episode, but Fellini accepted only on the condition that his wife, Giulietta Masina, star in it. They then sought out Jules Dassin, who likewise said he would accept the project only on the condition that his wife, Melina Mercouri, star; Pinal also rejected this condition. The idea was that Pinal should star in all the episodes, so Buñuel ended up filming the project himself. In the film, Pinal also made the first nude appearance in her career, an act still rare in Mexican cinema and the first nude scene in Buñuel's films.

Pinal was also on the verge of starring with Buñuel in the film Diary of a Chambermaid in France. She learned French and was willing to receive no pay for her role. However, French producer Serge Silberman ended up choosing Jeanne Moreau. Pinal was also going to shoot with Buñuel in Spain on Divinas palabras, but there were problems obtaining a copyright for the film. Years later, Pinal finally shot the movie in Mexico with Juan Ibáñez, featuring a nude scene.

After her work with Buñuel, Pinal returned to the cinema with the comedy Buenas noches, año nuevo (1964), where she co-starred with Ricardo Montalbán. In 1966 she made the film La soldadera, directed by José Bolaños and inspired by the Mexican Revolution. That same year, she participated in the Mexican-Brazilian co-production Juego peligroso, directed by Luis Alcoriza and based on a script by Gabriel García Márquez. She also appeared in the Franco-Italian-Mexican co-production Guns for San Sebastian, along with Anthony Quinn and Charles Bronson. In 1967 Pinal appeared in Shark!, with Burt Reynolds and directed by Samuel Fuller, making this the only Hollywood production in which Pinal appeared. Pinal starred in the film María Isabel (1968), based on a popular cartoon by Yolanda Vargas Dulché. Between the late 1960s and early 1970s, Pinal mostly made comedy films directed by René Cardona Jr. In 1976, Pinal starred in Las mariposas disecadas, a psychological suspense thriller.

Pinal returned in 1992 with the movie Modelo Antiguo, directed by Raúl Araiza. The decline of Mexican cinema and Pinal's activities on television and in other fields, such as politics, reduced the time she spent making films. In later years, her film appearances were limited to Ya no los hacen como antes (2002) her first and only dubbing role in El Agente 00-P2 (2009) and a brief special appearance in Tercera llamada (2013), her last feature film.

=== Stage ===
Pinal made her theatrical debut at the Instituto Nacional de Bellas Artes. Eventually, she acted in experimental plays, then worked at the Ideal Theater in Mexico City. Outside of this company, in 1950, she participated in the play Celos del aire with Manolo Fábregas and Carmen Montejo. That same year she represented Doña Inés in Don Juan Tenorio, co-starring with Jorge Mistral. The other plays from her early theatrical career are The Madwoman of Chaillot, co-starring Prudencia Griffel, and El cuadrante de la Soledad, by José Revueltas, with sets by the artist Diego Rivera. In 1954, Pinal participated in the play La Sed with Ernesto Alonso and the Argentinean actor Pedro López Lagar. In 1955 she obtained recognition in the theater scene in the cast of Anna Christie, along with Wolf Ruvinskis. In 1957 Pinal staged the play Desnúdate, Lucrecia, in Chile, with Jorge Mistral, who eventually became a star of Mexican cinema.

In 1958, Pinal was responsible for producing Mexico's first musical comedy, Bells Are Ringing, directed by Luis de Llano Palmer. For this work, Pinal received an offer from Judy Holliday's manager to work on Broadway, but Pinal refused to leave her career in Mexico. In 1964 she made the Mexican version of the musical Irma La Douce, alongside Julio Alemán and directed by Enrique Rambal. José Luis Ibáñez ended up becoming her head theater director. Under his direction, Pinal starred in the work Vidas privadas. One of her most notable works in musical comedy was the Mexican version of Mame, a successful Broadway musical. Thanks to her success, Pinal starred in three productions (1972, 1985, and 1989). In 1976 she also starred in the Mexican version of the musical Annie Get Your Gun.

In 1977, to commemorate her twenty-five-year career anniversary, Pinal set up a cabaret show entitled ¡Felicidades Silvia!. The show was presented with great success, first at the nightclub El Patio and then at the Teatro de la Ciudad in Mexico City. In 1978, she starred in the musical Plaza Suite. Her daughter Viridiana's death truncated the theatrical project Agnes of God, in which both starred in 1982. In 1983, Pinal starred in and produced the Mexican montage of the work La señorita de Tacna, based on the work of Mario Vargas Llosa. In 1986, Pinal starred in Anna Karenina. In 1988, in association with Margarita López Portillo, Pinal acquired the Cine Estadio, located in Mexico City's Colonia Roma, transforming it into a theatrical venue, the Teatro Silvia Pinal. The theater was opened in 1989 with the third production of the musical Mame, with Pinal at the head of the cast. Several problems caused Pinal to close the theater, which ceased production in 2000 and became a religious temple.

In 1992, Pinal acquired the former Cine Versailles, located in Colonia Juárez in Mexico City, and turned it into her second theater, the Diego Rivera Theater. This theater opened in 1991 with the production Lettice and Lovage. In 1996, Pinal returned to musical theater with the second Mexican version of Hello, Dolly!, opposite Ignacio López Tarso. Pinal's last work in theater was Gypsy (1998), starring alongside her daughter, singer Alejandra Guzmán. Pinal returned to the theater in 2005 with the play Debiera haber obispas, She participated in productions such as Adorables enemigas (2008) and Amor, dolor y lo que traía puesto (2012). In 2014, the Diego Rivera Theater changed its name to become the new Silvia Pinal Theatre.

She produced the Mexican versions of the musicals A Chorus Line (1989), Cats (1991) and La Cage aux Folles (1992).

=== Television ===
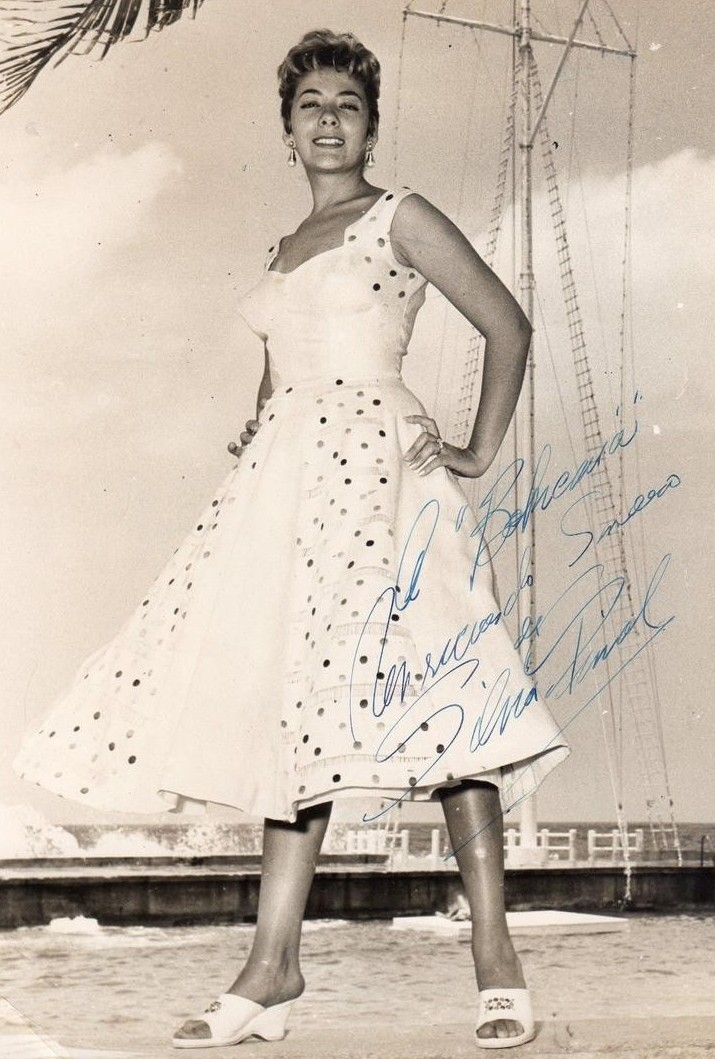
Pinal, c. 1955

Pinal dabbled in television since its appearance in Mexico in the early 1950s. In 1952, she participated in a television show titled Con los brazos abiertos. Later, she participated in numerous telecasts by Luis de Llano Palmer, where Pinal introduced playback on Mexican television.

Pinal hosted Los Especiales de Silvia Pinal, a comedy-musical show on Televisa, in the mid-1960s. When Silvia married the actor and singer Enrique Guzmán, both produced and starred in the variety show Silvia y Enrique, which ran for four years (1968–1972). Once separated from Guzmán, Silvia continued her variety show titled ¡Ahora Silvia!

In 1985, she became a producer and presenter of the Mujer, casos de la vida real TV show. Initially, the show was created to respond to cases and needs of the public and focused on locating victims of the 1985 Mexico City earthquake. Over time, the show evolved to present current issues in daily life, including domestic violence, legal issues, and public health. This production was successful and lasted over 20 years. The program was canceled in 2007.

In 1968, Pinal debuted in telenovelas with the historical production Los Caudillos, inspired by the Mexican War of Independence. Ernesto Alonso produced the telenovela. Her second foray into the genre was with the telenovela ¿Quién? (1973), produced by Guillermo Diazayas and based on a cartoon by Yolanda Vargas Dulché.

Eventually, Pinal decided to produce her telenovelas; her first hit was Mañana es primavera (1982), the last acting work of her daughter Viridiana before her death. In 1985, she also produced and starred in Eclipse. She also produced the melodramas Cuando los hijos se van (1983) and Tiempo de Amar (1987).

Her later appearances were as a special guest star in various telenovelas and television series. These included Carita de ángel (2000), in which she replaced actress Libertad Lamarque following her death, Fuego en la sangre (2008), Soy tu dueña (2010) and Mi marido tiene familia (2017). In 2009, Pinal performed in an episode of the series Mujeres asesinas.

=== Politics ===
Pinal became involved in politics after her fourth marriage, to the politician Tulio Hernández Gómez, governor of Tlaxcala. Between 1982 and 1987, Pinal was the first lady of that state. Eventually, she became a member of the Institutional Revolutionary Party (PRI) and, in 1991, was elected to the Chamber of Deputies for Mexico City's 27th district. In 1994 she was elected to the Assembly of Representatives of the Federal District, and from 1997 to 2000 she sat as a national-list senator. (Note: As the alternate of Esteban Moctezuma Barragán.) In those positions, her achievements included contributions to the Cinematographic Law to protect the rights of performers, her work on the Law of Condominiums and the Law of Tourism, tasks in favor of ecology, her promotion of the dissemination of theater books, and her fight against the Ministry of Finance to lower taxes on the theater.

Since the 1950s, Pinal actively participated in the trade union movement representing her country's actors. In 1998 she became the leader of the National Association of Interpreters (ANDI) and, between 2010 and 2014, she served as general secretary of the National Association of Actors (ANDA).

Pinal had legal problems in 2000 due to conflicts with her management as the president of the Association of Theater Producers (Protea) in the early 1990s. For this reason, she lived in Miami, United States, for some time. After eleven months, the proceedings were vacated and she returned to Mexico.

To protect older actors, she founded the Asociación Rafael Banquells, in charge of providing non-profit help to performers. As president of the association, Pinal delivered the Bravo Awards for highlights in music, film, theater, radio, television, dubbing and commercials during the year. The awards have been given annually since 1991.

== Personal life and death ==
Pinal was married four times. Her first marriage was to Cuban actor and director Rafael Banquells in 1947. She acknowledged that her marriage at such an early age was partly to escape her repressive father: "I changed my father for a softer one that stimulated me in my career." The couple divorced in 1952, a year after the birth of their daughter, Sylvia Pasquel, who later had a successful career as an actress.

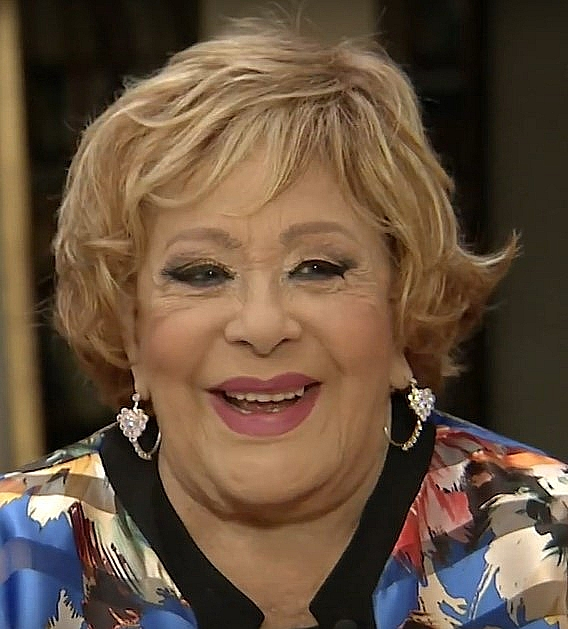
Pinal in 2019

Her second marriage was to the businessman and film producer Gustavo Alatriste. Pinal revealed on numerous occasions that Alatriste was the love of her life, a husband with whom she could have stayed forever. Pinal met Alatriste at a meeting at Ernesto Alonso's house when he was about to divorce actress Ariadne Welter. It was thanks to Alatriste that Pinal was able to make her film projects with Luis Buñuel. The marriage ended in 1967 due to Alatriste's infidelities and business problems between the couple. From her relationship with Alatriste, she had a daughter, actress Viridiana Alatriste (1963–1982). Viridiana died in a car accident in Mexico City in 1982 at the age of 19.

Her third marriage was to rock-and-roll singer and idol Enrique Guzmán. Pinal and Guzmán met when he was a guest on Pinal's television show ¡Ahora Silvia! They were married in 1967 despite some public resistance, as Pinal was 11 years older than her husband. Their marriage lasted nine years. They worked together and had two children: the singer Alejandra Guzmán (born 1968) and the musician and composer Luis Enrique Guzmán (born 1970).

Her last marriage was to the politician Tulio Hernández Gómez, at the time the governor of Tlaxcala. The couple married in 1982, and it was through Hernández that Pinal entered the world of politics. Pinal and Hernández divorced in 1995.

In addition to her marriages, at various times in her life, Pinal had multiple romances. In 1954, when filming Un extraño en la escalera, Pinal fell in love with her co-star, Arturo de Córdova. Other romances were with Mexican businessman Emilio Azcárraga Milmo, Egyptian actor Omar Sharif and American businessman Conrad Nicholson Hilton Jr.

Over time, Pinal became the head of one of Latin America's most famous artistic dynasties. Her daughters Sylvia and Viridiana followed in her footsteps as actresses. Alejandra, her youngest daughter, is one of Mexico's most popular singers. Alejandra's daughter, Frida Sofía, is a model living in Miami, United States. Pinal's granddaughter Stephanie Salas (daughter of Sylvia) has also forged a career as an actress and singer. Stephanie's daughters, Michelle Salas and Camila Valero, are both models and actresses.

In November 2024, Pinal was hospitalized in Tlalpan, Mexico City, for a urinary tract infection. She died there on 28 November, at the age of 93. The Senate of the Republic observed a minute's silence as a mark of respect, and the Secretariat of Culture organized a posthumous homage to the actress in the Palacio de Bellas Artes on 30 November. Her cremated ashes were placed at her family crypt, in the Panteón Jardín cemetery in San Ángel.

== Awards and honors ==
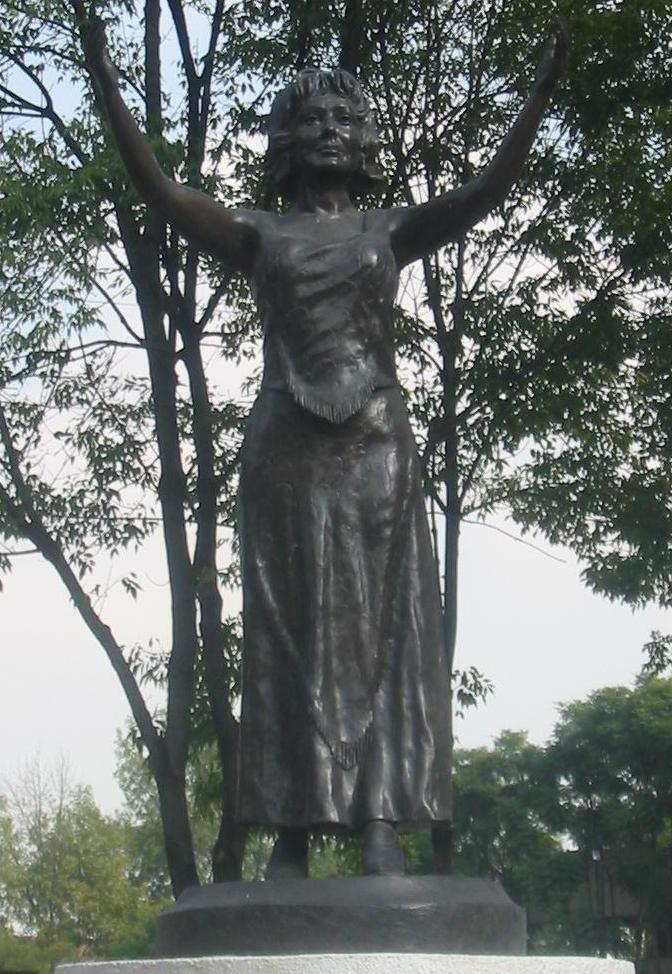
Statue of Silvia Pinal (2002) sculpted by Óscar Ponzanelli at the Jardín de los Grandes Valores, Mexico City

- In 1954, the beer company Corona created an advertisement that included a song in which they mentioned Pinal next to the Italian divas Gina Lollobrigida, Silvana Mangano and Silvana Pampanini.
- In 1956, Diego Rivera painted Pinal's portrait.
- Pinal is represented as one of the Seven Muses of Art in a stained glass window of the Teatro Xicohténcatl in Tlaxcala.
- In 2002, Pinal was recognized with a statue in her honor unveiled in Mexico City. Sculptor Óscar Ponzanelli did the work.
- In 2006, in Spain, Pinal was awarded the Orden de Isabel la Católica in the grade of Commander for her cultural contribution to the world of cinema.
- In 2015, Pinal published her autobiography, entitled Esta soy yo.
- In 2016, the Academy of Motion Picture Arts and Sciences (AMPAS) of Hollywood chose Pinal as one of its members to recognize her long career and contribution to the international film industry.
- At some point, Matt Casella, a headhunter for DreamWorks, sought Pinal to make a biographical series about her life; the project, however, failed to materialize.

== Bibliography ==
- Agrasánchez, Rogelio Jr. (2001). Bellezas del cine mexicano/Beauties of Mexican Cinema. Archivo Fílmico Agrasánchez. ISBN 978-968-5077-11-8.
- García Riera, Emilio (1996). El cine de Silvia Pinal. Universidad de Guadalajara (Centro de Investigaciones y Enseñanza Cinematográficas), Patronato de la Muestra de Cine Mexicano en Guadalajara, A. C. e Instituto Mexicano de Cinematografía (IMCINE). ISBN 978-968-895-714-1.
- Pinal, Silvia (2015). Esta soy yo. Porrúa. ISBN 978-607-09-2108-7.
