= This Is Silvia Pinal =

- Silvia Pinal, frente a ti
- Genre: Biographical
- Written by: Lele Portas; Marco Tulio
- Directed by: Carla Estrada; Mónica Miguel
- Starring: Itatí Cantoral
- Narrated by: Silvia Pinal
- Country of origin: Mexico
- Original language: Spanish
- No. of seasons: 1
- No. of episodes: 21

Production
- Executive producer: Carla Estrada
- Producers: Arturo Lorea; Guillermo Gutiérrez Méndez
- Camera setup: Multi-camera

Original release
- Network: Las Estrellas
- Release: 24 February – 22 March 2019

Silvia Pinal, frente a ti is a Mexican biographical television series directed by Carla Estrada and Mónica Miguel based on the life of the Mexican producer and actress Silvia Pinal. It stars Itatí Cantoral as the titular character. The series premiered on Las Estrellas on 24 February 2019 and ended on 22 March 2019.

== Cast ==
- Itatí Cantoral as Silvia Pinal
  - Nicole Vale as Young Silvia Pinal
  - Mía Rubín as Teen Silvia Pinal
  - Lara Campos as Child Silvia Pinal
  - Gala Prieto as Child Silvia Pinal
- Alberto Casanova as Rafael Banquells
- Marcelo Córdoba as Arturo de Córdova
- Pablo Montero as Gustavo Alatriste
- Harry Geithner as Emilio Azcárraga Milmo
  - Eleazar Gómez Young Emilio Azcárraga Milmo
- Gonzalo Guzmán as Felipe Román
- Arturo Peniche as Luis Pinal
- Gabriela Rivero as Sonia
  - Roberta Burns as Young Sonia
- Luis José Santander as Moisés Pasquel
- Leticia Perdigón as Eva
- Roberto Blandón as Luis Buñuel
- Kenia Gascón as Merilú
  - María de la Fuente as Young Merilú
- Fátima Torre as Concha
- Ricardo Franco as Jorge Negrete
- Pedro Romo as Ramón
- Jorge Gallego as Pedro Infante
- Patricia Bernal as Jovita
- Sharis Cid as Libertad Lamarque
- Adriana Nieto as Livia
  - Odemaris Ruiz as Young Livia
  - Mari Jose Alanís as Teen Livia
- Sebastian Moncayo as Ernesto
- José María Negri as Andrés Soler
- Fernando Alonso as Severiano
- David Ramos as Diego Rivera
- José María Galeano as Enrique Rodríguez Alday "El Güero"
- Rafael Amador as Emilio Fernández
- Sara Nieto as Madre Superiora
- Noelia Zanón as Carmen
- Maya Mishalska as Jeanne
- Sara Montalvo as Josefina
- Carmen Becerra as Sara Dorantes
- Cassandra Sánchez Navarro as Viridiana Alatriste
  - Victoria Biagio as Child Viridiana Alatriste
- Hany Sáenz as Antonia
- Lorena Álvarez as Teresa
- Saturnino Martínez as Guillermo Monroy
- Ernesto Godoy as Carlos
- Héctor Álvarez as Rodolfo
- Raúl Araiza as Raúl Araiza
- Mane de la Parra as Fernando Frade
- Héctor Cruz as Mario Montoya
- Pedro Sicard as Tulio Demicheli
- Ernesto Laguardia as Julio
- Michel López as Javier Garcia
- María Chacón as Alondra
- Vanya Aguayo as Fanny

== Production ==
In December 2016 it was confirmed that Televisa was preparing a series based on the life of Silvia Pinal, and that production would begin in February 2017. Then in May 2017 it was announced that the series would be canceled, but later it was confirmed that it was only postponed. Because of this Carla Estrada said "It is a project that does not interest Televisa at the moment, so the pre-production of the series would be resumed in November 2017". On November 16, 2017 the beginning of the production of the series was officially confirmed. Filming ended in April 2018.

=== Casting ===
For the role of Silvia Pinal in her adult stage, it was thought in Fernanda Castillo, due to their resemblance, but Castillo rejected the character because she was already filming the series El Señor de los Cielos. On 28 March 2017, Carla Estrada confirmed Itatí Cantoral as the adult protagonist of the series through her Twitter account. In a press release Estrada confirmed the participation of actresses Mía Rubín, Gala Prieto, Lara Campos, Nicole Vale and Sylvia Pasquel who will play Pinal at different stages of her life.

== Ratings ==
Viewership and ratings per season of This Is Silvia Pinal
Season	Episodes	First aired		Last aired		Avg. viewers (millions)
Season	Episodes	Date	Viewers (millions)	Date	Viewers (millions)	Avg. viewers (millions)
1	21	24 February 2019	3.5	22 March 2019	3.9	3.74

== Episodes ==
No.	Title	Directed by	Written by	Original release date	Viewers (millions)
1	"Esta es mi historia"	Mónica Miguel	Lele Portas & Marco Tulio	24 February 2019 (Note: Premiered early online through Las Estrellas website and YouTube channel on 17 February 2019.)	3.5
Guaymas, Sonora; 1931, Merilú, a single mother tries to take her daughter Silvia forward without the help of the biological father. Merilú meets Colonel Luis Pinal, from whom she suddenly falls in love and marries. Both decide to move to Cuernavaca, Morelos, where they begin to start a life and continue with their plans while Silvia grows to become a woman of good. For her stay in Cuernavaca, Silvia begins to feel interest in the world of entertainment, the stage, radio, singing and acting. But her father, Luis, dedicated to Silvia following that dream, encourages her to continue studying. Suddenly after running out of work, Colonel Luis and his family move to Mexico City, where Silvia meets Moisés Pasquel in the XEW radio studios, with whom she suddenly starts a friendship, without knowing that he is really her biological father. After learning the truth about her father, he tries to approach her, until after a scandal published in Mexican newspapers, he denies her as a daughter, so Silvia decides to move away from him and follow what her father Luis has instilled in her and she begins her studies of Typing. But after a while, Silvia turns 15, and begins to live a life of a teenager in the process of becoming a woman. So she starts working to pay for her singing and acting studies.
2	"Soy mamá"	Mónica Miguel	Lele Portas & Marco Tulio	25 February 2019 (Note: Premiered early online through Las Estrellas website and YouTube channel on 22 February 2019.)	3.9
At age 15, Silvia meets Rafael Banquells, a man who helped her unconditionally to enter the world of television and with whom she would eventually reach the altar. When Silvia learns that she is pregnant, she continues to work until the delivery surprises her on stage.
3	"Decidir es renunciar"	Mónica Miguel	Lele Portas & Marco Tulio	26 February 2019	4.3
With the birth of their first daughter, Livia, the economic situation worsens, so Silvia asks Jorge Negrete for help. Silvia must combine her role as mother with actress and accept the death of her father.
4	"El derecho a eligir"	Mónica Miguel	Lele Portas & Marco Tulio	27 February 2019	4.1
The relationship with Rafael Banquells begins to deteriorate and Silvia must be divorced from him. Silvia stars in the first nude on television. Pedro Infante falls in love with Silvia when he sees her for the first time. Silvia has a great affection for him, but she can not correspond to his love as he would have liked.
5	"Un extraño en la escalera"	Mónica Miguel	Lele Portas & Marco Tulio	28 February 2019	3.7
Silvia forgets her daughter in the house of dressmakers. Silvia decides to risk changing her look and goes to Cuba to film Un extraño en la escalera next to Arturo de Córdova. Soon, the insinuating glances between them are becoming more frequent.
6	"Patito"	Mónica Miguel	Lele Portas & Marco Tulio	1 March 2019 (Note: Premiered early online through Las Estrellas website on 27 February 2019.)	3.5
Arturo de Córdova behaves indifferent with Silvia, so she is advised to forget him, since she has only been a passing love. Silvia begins to position herself as the best actress of the moment in Mexico. Silvia begins a relationship with Emilio Azcárraga Milmo, with whom she is associated to produce the first musical theater work. The couple later accepts that they can never be together and decide to separate.
7	"Ring Ring llama el amor"	Mónica Miguel	Lele Portas & Marco Tulio	4 March 2019	3.4
Silvia meets the painter Diego Rivera. Severiano de la Barrera becomes Silvia's boyfriend and soon agrees to marry him. On the day of the wedding she leaves him to go with Emilio.
8	"El güero"	Mónica Miguel	Lele Portas & Marco Tulio	5 March 2019	3.7
Silvia meets Enrique Rodríguez Alday, "El Güero", with whom she begins a very passionate and full of formality relationship, for which she will want to spend the rest of her life with him. But a few days after formalizing their relationship, El Güero suffers a dramatic death. Silvia takes refuge in the work so as not to think about the terrible loss.
9	"Barcelona"	Mónica Miguel	Lele Portas & Marco Tulio	6 March 2019	3.5
Due to her depression, Silvia suffers a car accident and loses film projects. Given this, she will travel to Barcelona in search of new opportunities, but will have to leave Livia in a boarding school.
10	"Viridiana"	Mónica Miguel	Lele Portas & Marco Tulio	7 March 2019	3.5
Gustavo Alatriste conquers Silvia from the first moment and does not rest until he marries her. Luis Buñuel proposes to Silvia to make the film Viridiana, under the production of Alatriste, without knowing that it would be banned. Silvia is pregnant with Alatriste's baby.
11	"Gustavo Alatriste, la ruptura"	Mónica Miguel	Lele Portas & Marco Tulio	8 March 2019	3.5
Silvia gives birth to Viridiana, however, she begins to have many problems with Gustavo Alatriste, unleashing a love break that led her to commit many crazy things.
12	"Otra oportunidad"	Mónica Miguel	Lele Portas & Marco Tulio	11 March 2019	3.6
Silvia makes Alatriste leave her house and decides to continue her life. She meets Felipe Román and sings at his side, a click arises between them and she begins a relationship with him, unleashing a fight with her daughter Livia. Shortly after, Silvia finds out that she is expecting her third child.
13	"El show de Silvia y Felipe"	Mónica Miguel	Lele Portas & Marco Tulio	12 March 2019	3.8
With resounding success starts the program Silvia y Felipe, at the same time that the actress had to endure the insults of the fans of her husband, with whom she had two children, Alondra and Luis Felipe Román. Silvia discovers that Felipe is cheating and her world returns to crumble.
14	"Celos, malditos celos"	Mónica Miguel	Lele Portas & Marco Tulio	13 March 2019	3.7
Due to his professional and sentimental jealousy, Silvia lives the physical and psychological abuse within her marriage with Felipe, who ends up abusing her sexually. This will unleash a violent season in Silvia's life. And even though she knew the damage he was doing to her, she stayed much longer by his side.
15	"Mátame de una vez"	Mónica Miguel	Lele Portas & Marco Tulio	14 March 2019	4.0
Silvia works alongside Raúl Araiza and Rogelio Guerra, but this fact provokes the jealousy of Felipe Román, who decides to hit her in front of his own daughter without caring at all. Her marriage no longer makes sense, but Silvia does not know how to end that torment.
16	"Volver a nacer"	Mónica Miguel	Lele Portas & Marco Tulio	15 March 2019	3.9
Silvia goes to Acapulco fleeing from Felipe, but he surprises her to hit her one more time. After accepting that he does not know how to control his jealous attacks, Felipe gives in to give Silvia a divorce. Silvia reconciles with the La Gorda Cantón and poses nude for a magazine.
17	"Fernando Frade"	Mónica Miguel	Lele Portas & Marco Tulio	18 March 2019	3.7
Livia learns that her mother goes out with Fernando Frade and confronts her for being with a man younger than her. Viridiana turns 15 and becomes the star of Mañana es primavera.
18	"Mi dolor más profundo"	Mónica Miguel	Lele Portas & Marco Tulio	19 March 2019	3.7
Governor Julio Fernández gives Viridiana a new car, Silvia does not agree, but ends up accepting it. Viridiana is nominated for an Ariel Award, but before the awards ceremony she goes partying and on her return home she suffers a terrible accident that ends her life.
19	"Bienvenido a la familia"	Mónica Miguel	Lele Portas & Marco Tulio	20 March 2019	3.8
Silvia finds out about Viridiana's death. The pain overwhelms her enormously, but she decides to continue with her life and marry Julio, knowing that she can not do anything to recover her daughter.
20	"México está de pie"	Mónica Miguel	Lele Portas & Marco Tulio	21 March 2019	3.8
The accident that Julio suffered causes problems between him and Silvia, he asks her to end their relationship but she refuses. The earthquake of '85 shakes the city. Silvia provides support to those affected. Livia has a daughter with Fernando, whom she also names Viridiana.
21	"Gracias a la vida"	Mónica Miguel	Lele Portas & Marco Tulio	22 March 2019	3.9
Silvia reconciles with Livia and accepts that Alondra takes her own path. Silvia suffers the death of her great friend Emilio Azcárraga Milmo, shortly after she cries another loss, her mother. Silvia is unjustly accused of embezzlement and is forced to flee Mexico. Upon returning to Mexico, Silvia will be happy to be close to her family.

=== Special ===
Title	Original release date
"Silvia Pinal, tras bambalinas"	23 March 2019
Behind the scenes of the production of the series including how the characterizations and setting of the series were made. Also, the complications there were before and during filming.

== Awards and nominations ==
Year	Award	Category	Nominated	Result
2020	TVyNovelas Awards	Best Drama Series	Carla Estrada	Won
2020	TVyNovelas Awards	Best Actress in a Drama Series	Itatí Cantoral	Won
2020	TVyNovelas Awards	Best Actor in a Drama Series	Gonzalo Guzmán	Nominated
