= Now I Am Rich =

1952 film

- Directed by: Rogelio A. González
- Written by: Rogelio A. González; Gregorio Walerstein
- Starring: Pedro Infante; Marga López; Irma Dorantes
- Cinematography: Agustín Martínez Solares
- Edited by: Rafael Ceballos
- Music by: Manuel Esperón
- Production company: Cinematográfica Filmex
- Release date: 22 August 1952
- Running time: 110 minutes
- Country: Mexico
- Language: Spanish

Now I Am Rich (Spanish: Ahora soy rico) is a 1952 Mexican drama film directed by Rogelio A. González and starring Pedro Infante, Marga López and Irma Dorantes. It is the sequel to the film of the same year, Un rincón cerca del cielo, in which also appeared Antonio Aguilar and participed Silvia Pinal.

The film's sets were designed by the art director Jorge Fernández.

== Main cast ==
- Pedro Infante as Pedro González
- Marga López as Marga
- Antonio Aguilar as Tony Merino
- Irma Dorantes as Chiqui
- Eduardo Alcaraz as Dr. Velasco
- Arturo Soto Rangel as Zapatero
- Gilberto González as Damián
- Gloria Mestre as Salomé
- Antonio R. Frausto as Tachito
- Carlos Riquelme as Doctor

== Bibliography ==
- Amador, María Luisa. Cartelera cinematográfica, 1950-1959. UNAM, 1985.
