= Simon of the Desert =

1965 film by Luis Buñuel

- Original film poster
- Spanish: Simón del desierto
- Directed by: Luis Buñuel
- Screenplay by: Luis Buñuel; Julio Alejandro
- Story by: Luis Buñuel
- Produced by: Gustavo Alatriste
- Starring: Claudio Brook; Silvia Pinal
- Cinematography: Gabriel Figueroa
- Edited by: Carlos Savage Jr.
- Music by: Raúl Lavista
- Production companies: Sindicato de Trabajadores de la Producción Cinematográfica; Estudios Churubusco
- Distributed by: Altura International
- Release dates: August 27, 1965 (Venice); February 9, 1970 (Mexico)
- Running time: 45 minutes
- Country: Mexico
- Languages: Spanish; Latin

Simon of the Desert (Spanish: Simón del desierto) is a 1965 Mexican surrealist satirical comedy film co-written and directed by Luis Buñuel, starring Claudio Brook and Silvia Pinal. It is loosely based on the life of the ascetic 5th-century Syrian Christian saint Simeon Stylites, who lived for 36 years on top of a pillar. The screenplay was co-written by Buñuel and his frequent collaborator Julio Alejandro.

Following Viridiana (1961) and The Exterminating Angel (1962), Simon of the Desert was the third, and last, of Buñuel's films to feature Pinal and be produced by Gustavo Alatriste, Pinal's husband at the time. It was also the final film of Buñuel's Mexican period before he returned to Europe. Today, it is generally acclaimed by film critics, who consider it to be one of the director's most demonstrative works.

== Plot ==
The ascetic Simón Stylites has spent six years, six weeks, and six days on a small platform atop a pillar in the middle of the Syrian desert. A crowd of monks and peasants gathers around him and invites him to move to a much taller pillar that has been erected by a wealthy family to thank him for healing one of them. Peasants call out for his help as he is led the short distance to the new pillar, and his aging mother approaches and says she wishes to be near him until her death. He allows her to stay, though he says he will not acknowledge her so she does not distract him from his prayers. The monks attempt to bestow holy orders on Simón, but he refuses, saying he is an unworthy sinner.

Once atop his new pillar, Simón leads the crowd below in the Lord's Prayer, but a woman interrupts to ask him to help her husband, whose hands were cut off for stealing. Simón prays and the man's hands reappear, but no one is very impressed by the miracle, and the peasants depart. The monks stay behind to pray with Simón, but leave after he chastises one of them for looking at a woman who walks by carrying a jug.

Brother Matías, a young monk, delivers lettuce and water to Simón, interrupting his prayers. Simón becomes frustrated after Matías leaves, as he had managed to forget his body, but now he is hungry and thirsty and yearns to feel the earth and embrace his mother. Satan, who had also been the woman with the jug, appears to Simón dressed like a young girl from a future time. She tries to tempt him with her body and jabs him in the back, but he banishes her by appealing to Christ.

One day, while Simón is leading the gathered monks in a prayer about asceticism, Brother Trifón interrupts to say he has found cheese, bread, and wine in Simón's food sack. Simón refuses to defend himself, and Trifón swears he did not place the food in the bag, so the monks pray to the Holy Ghost to show them who is guilty. Trifón has a fit, during which he admits to planting the food and rants against Simón and the teachings of the Church, and Simón exorcises Satan from him. As the other monks carry Trifón back to the monastery, Simón tells them to send Matías away until he can grow a beard.

When he has been atop the column for eight years, eight months, and eight days, Satan comes to Simón dressed as God. She flatters him, and he is initially fooled, but he sees through the ruse when she says she is saddened by his excessive sacrifices and tells him to come down and experience earthly pleasures if he wants to get close to God. He rejects her and she leaves, after which Simón decides that, as penance for mistaking the Devil for God, he will henceforth stand on one leg.

The monk who looked at the woman visits Simón for his forgiveness and blessing and to tell him that the Antichrist is approaching Rome with an army. He remarks that mankind will always be in conflict because of its ideas about ownership, and, when Simón cannot understand, says he fears Simón has become disconnected from and of little use to the outside world. Simón blesses the monk and he leaves.

A coffin slides across the desert toward Simón's pillar. Satan gets out of the coffin and transports Simón to a crowded nightclub in 1960s New York City with a live rock band on stage. The pair are in modern dress and sitting at a table, and Simón, looking disinterested, asks Satan what dance the people are doing. She responds that they are dancing the "Radioactive Flesh". As a man asks Satan to dance with him, Simón gets up to return home, but she says he has to "stick it out till the end".

== Cast ==
- Claudio Brook as Simón
- Silvia Pinal as The Devil
- Enrique Álvarez Félix as Brother Matías, the young monk
- Hortensia Santoveña as Simón's mother
- Francisco Reiguera as an old monk
- Luis Aceves Castañeda as Brother Trifón, the monk who slanders Simón when possessed
- Enrique García Álvarez as Brother Zenón, an old monk
- Antonio Bravo as the monk who tries to ordain Simón
- Enrique del Castillo as the mutilated man, whose hands were cut off for stealing
- Eduardo MacGregor as the monk who looks at a woman and later climbs a ladder to talk to Simón

Uncredited

- Jesús Fernández as the dwarf goatherd
- Ángel Merino as Praxedes, the rich man who donates Simón's taller column

== Production ==
=== Development ===
In 1960, after a long-term exile in Mexico, Buñuel returned to his home country of Spain to direct Viridiana. That film scandalized the Vatican and the Franco regime, leading Buñuel to resume his exile. Back in Mexico, he directed The Exterminating Angel in 1962 and Simon of the Desert in 1965. All three films starred Silvia Pinal, featured elements critical of religion, and recalled elements from Buñuel's earlier surrealist period.

=== Filming ===
The film was shot primarily in the Samalayuca Dune Fields of Chihuahua, while the final scene was shot at Estudios Churubusco in Mexico City. Pinal's daughter Sylvia Pasquel was an uncredited extra in the nightclub sequence.

Buñuel later said that the film was supposed to be feature-length, but producer Gustavo Alatriste ran out of money. However, Pinal recalled:

It is not true that Simon of the Desert was a medium-length film because of Gustavo Alatriste's economic troubles. It was a production problem. There were supposed to be three stories with different directors. Buñuel's was just one of them. Alatriste and I went to Europe to seek Federico Fellini, who was delighted to film with Buñuel, but he suggested his wife Giulietta Masina as the star. We saw another director, Jules Dassin, who would also accept if he was able to work with Melina Mercouri, his wife. We said no to them, because the idea was that the three stories would be starred by me. So, because everyone wanted to direct their own wives, Alatriste wanted to direct his own part with his wife, with me. I said no, and that was the beginning of our separation. Alatriste could not understand, or at least he was very hurt, when I explained to him that he could not direct beside Buñuel.

At one point, Pinal suggested that Vittorio de Sica and Orson Welles could direct the other segments of the proposed anthology film, but nothing came of this, although in some markets Simon of the Desert was distributed with Welles' The Immortal Story (1968).

== Release ==
Simon of the Desert was screened at the 26th Venice International Film Festival on 27 August 1965, where it won both a FIPRESCI Prize and a Special Jury Prize. A Mexican release followed on December 1, 1965, and it was later shown in New York on 11 February 1969.

== Reception ==
A contemporary review in the Monthly Film Bulletin said the short length of the film ensures "that Simon's isolation, shot by Figueroa with marvellous ingenuity, never risks becoming tedious. On the other hand, Bunuel's creativity is in such fine form that one can't help regretting the loss of those unshot extra minutes" and concluded that the film "makes for a startling, charming and healthily wicked little anecdote, with easily more sense to its hard theology than one could find in a whole tribe of biblical epics".

Simon of the Desert has received much acclaim since its original release. On review aggregator website Rotten Tomatoes, it has a 100% approval rating based on reviews from 17 critics, with an average score of 8.5/10.

== Legacy ==
According to musician A.C. Newman, the music video for his song The Laws Have Changed by The New Pornographers was “lifted wholesale” from Simon of the Desert.
