= Frida Sofía =

Musical artist, fashion model, Television presenter

- Born: Frida Sofía Moctezuma Guzmán; March 13, 1992 (age 34); Mexico City, Distrito Federal, Mexico
- Education: Miami International University of Art & Design
- Occupations: Singer; songwriter; fashion model; television presenter
- Years active: 1993–present
- Spouse: Miguel Bretadotti (m. 2015; div. 2017)
- Parent(s): Pablo Moctezuma; Alejandra Guzmán
- Family: Enrique Guzmán (grandfather); Silvia Pinal (grandmother); Sylvia Pasquel (half aunt); Stephanie Salas (half cousin sister)
- Musical career
- Origin: Miami, U.S.
- Genres: Pop; electronica; dance
- Instruments: Vocals, piano, guitar
- Label: Miind music
- Website: ifridag.com

Frida Sofía Moctezuma Guzmán-Pinal (born March 13, 1992), commonly known as Frida Sofía, is a Mexican singer, musician, fashion model, entrepreneur, brand designer and television presenter; she rose to prominence as a fashion model & media personality before launching a musical career as a solo performer. Sofía possesses a lyric soprano vocal range. According to U.S Billboard magazine, Sofía made her musical solo debut on international television in 2019, as the main act during the Gala Anual de la Entrega del Balón de Oro, held in Los Angeles, California; the sporting event was seen by over 30 million people.

In the summer of 2023, Sofía was cast in the United States as a main contestant, for the eleventh season of Univision's dancing reality competition Mira quién baila, the Latin American adaptation of Dancing with the Stars. In 2024, Sofía was part of the original main cast of NBC/Telemundo's reality show La casa de los famosos 4, finally she decided to terminate the contract in discordance with the privacy terms and conditions.

== Early life ==
Frida Sofía was born to Mexican rock singer Alejandra Guzmán and Mexican entrepreneur Pablo Moctezuma in Mexico City, Mexico, on March 13, 1992; she is the granddaughter of Mexican Golden Age actress Silvia Pinal and singer Enrique Guzmán.

== Career ==
=== 1993–2003: Early career in Mexico ===
From a young age, she obtained her first acting role in the Mexican drama film La Cumbre de las Águilas in 1993; later, she made her debut as a child model. At the time, Sofía collaborated on stage with her grandmother Silvia Pinal; later, she performed on tour with Alejandra Guzmán.

=== 2004–2018: Exile in the United States, Univision debut and Playboy ===
In 2004, after a widely known kidnapping attempt in Mexico city, Sofía moved to the United States to start a professional career.

In 2013, she began working in a number of American television networks including Univision, Estrella TV or Telemundo; Sofía was also cast to host the morning television show ¡Despierta América!. Subsequently, Sofía was hired by Cosmopolitan and Televisa to perform as the official presenter of the Cosmopolitan Summer Splash show, held in Miami Florida.

In 2014, she graduated from college with two bachelor's degrees in -Design management- and -International fashion marketing- at the Miami International University of Art & Design. Furthermore, she obtained the leading role as a presenter in a number of international fashion and musical events including Los Premios Glamour and Los Premios de la Radio in the United States.

On the other hand, Sofía was hired in February 2015, to be on the cover of Playboy magazine for Latin America.

=== 2019–present: Musical solo debut, Balón de Oro and upcoming double album ===
In 2019, the Mexican Football Federation and Univision hired Frida Sofía to perform as the main musical act for the Gala Anual de la Entrega del Balón de Oro, held in Los Angeles, California. According to U.S Billboard magazine, the live performance became her international musical solo debut which was seen by 30 million viewers.

Frida Sofía premiered her debut single "Ándale" at the Orpheum Theatre in Downtown Los Angeles. The single, which was produced by the Scottish-Canadian country musician Johnny Reid in Nashville, Tennessee, debuted in the Top 5 in Mexico, and at number 13 on iTunes, selling more than 3 million digital downloads during the first four weeks after its release. On October 24, 2019, she released her next single called "Nada Es Para Tanto", recorded in Nashville, Tennessee, produced by Zach Hall, drummer of the rock band Free Throw. Sofía premiered the single at the Universal Studios, in Orlando Florida.

Inside the modeling industry, Frida Sofía has been working in several fashion events and catwalks, working with designers like es:Leonardo Rocco. She also played the leading role in a number of music videos for other singers including Larry Hernández.

In 2021, After the release of her following single, "Chicas Malas", Frida Sofía was nominated for the American Premios Juventud (Juventud Awards). In 2023, is scheduled for worldwide release the first full-length album by Sofía, in CD, Long Play and Digital format; which will incorporate elements of New wave music, Electronica, Arena rock and Rhythm and blues.

== Personal life ==
In 2004, Sofía moved to Litchfield County, Connecticut after a kidnapping attempt in Mexico City; soon after, she moved to Miami, Florida to start a professional career in the United States. She has three younger siblings, Natasha, Beatriz and Emiliano Moctezuma. In 2021, Sofía alleged that her grandfather, the Venezuelan-born singer Enrique Guzmán, had molested her as a child. Sofía is also an entrepreneur and startup investor, based in Florida.

== Discography ==
Year	Title	Release date	Details
2019	Ándale	* Released: June 7, 2019	* Label: MiiND Music * Formats: Digital download
2019	Nada Es Para Tanto	* Released: October 25, 2019	* Label: MiiND MUSIC * Formats: digital download
2021	Chicas Malas	* Released: February 12, 2021	* featuring MARi Burelle * Label: MiiND MUSIC * Formats: digital download

== See also ==
- List of glamour models
