= Annik Malvil =

French model and actress (born 1936)

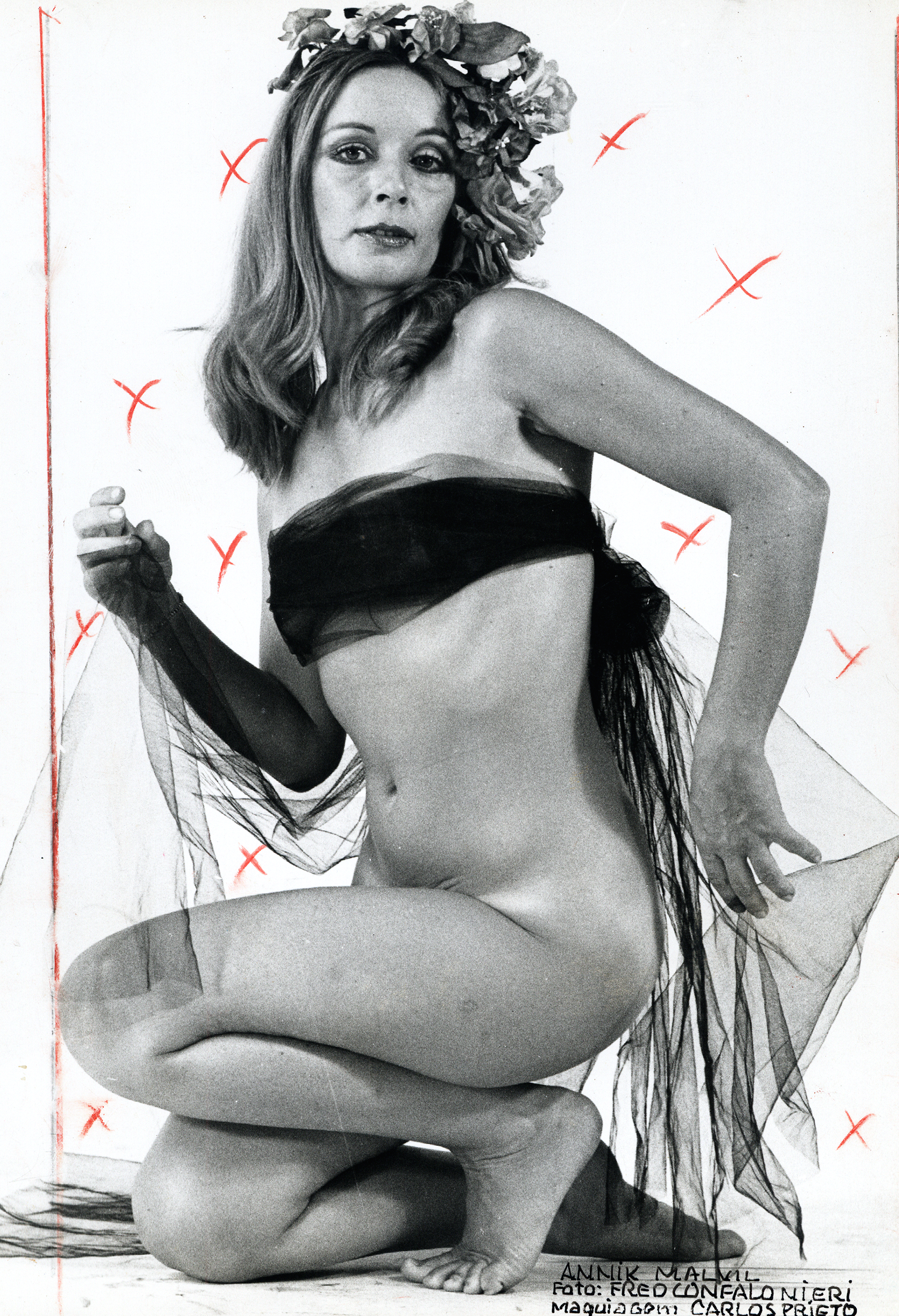
- Annik Malvil in 1973
- Born: Annick Ghislaine Astrid Deligant; 11 May 1936 (age 90); Ixelles, Belgium
- Occupations: Actress; model; singer
- Years active: 1954–1986

Annick Ghislaine Astrid Deligant, better known as Annik Malvil (born 11 May 1936), is a former French actress, model, and singer based in Brazil.

== Biography ==
Malvil was born in Ixelles, Belgium to a French father and a Belgian mother, and grew up in France. She moved to Brazil with her family as a teenager, and settled in São Paulo in 1954. After working as a model, she began working on radio and television stations in Rio de Janeiro and São Paulo. In Brazil she was known as Francesinha. Her first film was Conceição (1960), opposite Hélio Souto. Annik's notable films include That Man from Rio (1964) and Ana, a Libertina (1975). She has also acted in the miniseries Memórias de um Gigolo (1986). As an actress, she has starred in over 18 films. She eventually left the film industry after the arrival of pornochanchada.

As a model, Annik was featured in numerous magazines. In May 1969, she posed nude for Fairplay magazine. She is known for launching the tube dress on the catwalks. She also had a career as a singer, recording several singles and appearing on some of the first episodes of Jovem Guarda.

After leaving the entertainment industry, Malvil ran a travel agency from 1975 to 1991. She then moved to Miami, but returned to Brazil in 2006.

== Filmography ==
=== Films ===
Year	Title	Role
1975	Ana, a Libertina	Vizinha de Ana
1973	Os Homens Que Eu Tive	Tânia
1970	O Ritual dos Sádicos	—N/a
1970	Vida e Glória de um Canalha	Olga
1969	O Cangaceiro sem Deus	Lúcia
1968	Um Dia, numa Cidade	Sônia
1968	Viagem ao Fim do Mundo	Pandora
1968	Enfim Sós... com o Outro	Fabienne
1967	Juego peligroso	Esposa
1966	007 1/2 no Carnaval	—N/a
1966	Cuidado, Espião Brasileiro em Ação	Isabel
1966	Essa Gatinha É Minha	Cláudia
1964	L'homme de Rio	Airplane hostess (uncredited)
1964	Pão de Açúcar	Chiquinha
1963	Os Vencidos	—N/a
1960	Férias no Arraial	Nhá Maria Amélia
1960	Conceição	—N/a

=== Television ===
Year	Title	Role
1986	Memórias de um Gigolô	Nanette
1969	Les Globe-trotters	Ms Da Silva
1965	Olhos que Amei	Condessa Sônia de Alemberg
