= La dulce enemiga =

La Dulce Enemiga
- Mexican theatrical release poster
- Directed by: Tito Davison
- Screenplay by: Tulio Demicheli
- Produced by: Felipe Mier; Óscar J. Brooks
- Starring: Silvia Pinal; Joaquín Cordero; Carlos Riquelme; Mary López
- Cinematography: Jack Draper
- Edited by: Rafael Caballos
- Music by: Manuel Esperón
- Production companies: Mier and Brooks Productions
- Release date: May 2, 1957 (Mexico)
- Running time: 95 minutes
- Country: Mexico
- Language: Spanish

La Dulce Enemiga (The Sweet Enemy) is a 1957 Mexican drama film, directed by Tito Davison. The film won two of the four Ariel Awards it was nominated for in 1958, Best Director for Davison and Best Actress for Silvia Pinal. The screenplay is adapted by Tulio Demicheli, Ulyses Petit de Murat and Davison from the novel L´ennemie by André-Paul Antoine.

== Main cast ==
- Silvia Pinal as Lucrecia
- Joaquín Cordero as Nicolás
- Carlos Riquelme as Antonio
- Mary López as Catalina
- Miguel Manzano as Doctor Hugo Bellini
- Consuelo Monteagudo as Anita, secretary
- Nicolás Rodríguez as Federico, butler
- Armando Arriola as Lucrecia's dad
- Alberto de Mendoza as Ricardo

== Awards ==
=== Ariel Awards ===
The Ariel Awards are awarded annually by the Mexican Academy of Film Arts and Sciences in Mexico. La Dulce Enemiga received two awards out of four nominations.

Year	Nominee / work	Award	Result
1958	Tito Davison	Best Director	Won
1958	Silvia Pinal	Best Actress	Won
1958	Carlos Riquelme	Best Supporting Actor	Nominated
1958	Tulio Demicheli	Best Adapted Screenplay	Nominated
