= Juego peligroso =

- Directed by: Luis Alcoriza; Arturo Ripstein
- Written by: Luis Alcoriza; Fernando Galiana; Pancho Córdova; Gabriel Garcia Marquez; Jorge Ibargüengoitia
- Produced by: Alfredo Ripstein Hijo; Cesar Santos Galindo
- Cinematography: Guillermo Angulo; Rosalio Solano
- Edited by: Waldemar Noya
- Music by: Dorival Caymmi; Nacho Mendez; Tamba Trio; Remo Usai
- Release date: July 20, 1967
- Running time: 94 minutes
- Country: Mexico
- Language: Spanish

Juego peligroso ("Dangerous Game") is a 1967 Mexican film. It was directed by Luis Alcoriza and Arturo Ripstein. Gabriel Garcia Marquez contributed to the script, and also made a cameo as an actor.

== Synopsis ==
Two film features two stories, "H.O." and "Divertimento."

- H.O., A newly wed couple interact with a man on the highway to Rio.
- Divertimento, A woman wants to kill her lover's wife, while the couple plan to stage that same crime and blackmail her.

== Cast ==
- Silvia Pinal
- Julissa
- Milton Rodriguez
- Leonardo Villar
- Annik Malvil
- Jefferson Dantas
- Eva Wilma
- Atila Almeida
- Ademir Benevento
- Antonio Dresjan
- Celso Dresjan
- Diana Azambuja
- Kleber Drable
- Leila Diniz
- Ricardo Luna
