= Una cita de amor =

1958 film

- Directed by: Emilio Fernández
- Written by: Pedro Antonio de Alarcón; Mauricio Magdaleno
- Produced by: Jorge García Besné
- Starring: Silvia Pinal
- Cinematography: Gabriel Figueroa
- Edited by: Gloria Schoemann
- Release date: 5 June 1958
- Running time: 86 minutes
- Country: Mexico
- Language: Spanish
- Box office: 32.3 million tickets (Soviet Union)

Una cita de amor (English: A Date of Love) is a 1958 Mexican drama film directed by Emilio Fernández. It was entered into the 8th Berlin International Film Festival. It is based on a novel by Pedro Antonio de Alarcón.

== Cast ==
- Silvia Pinal as Soledad
- Carlos López Moctezuma as Don Mariano
- Jaime Fernández as Róman Chávez
- José Elías Moreno as Juez de Acordada
- Agustín Fernández as Sustituto de juez
- Guillermo Cramer as Ernesto
- Amalia Mendoza as Genoveva
- Arturo Soto Rangel as Sacerdote
- Jorge Treviño as Anunciador
- Rogelio Fernández
- Antonio León Yáñez
- Margarito Luna
- Gregorio Acosta
- Emilio Garibay
