= Eclipse (TV series) =

- Genre: Telenovela
- Written by: Norberto Vieyra
- Starring: Silvia Pinal; Joaquín Cordero; Eduardo Palomo; Ofelia Guilmáin
- Country of origin: Mexico
- Original language: Spanish
- No. of episodes: 30

Production
- Executive producer: Silvia Pinal
- Cinematography: Carlos Guerra

Original release
- Network: Canal de las Estrellas
- Release: April 30 – October 12, 1984

Related
- Bodas de odio; La traición

Eclipse is a Mexican telenovela produced by Silvia Pinal for Televisa in 1984.

Silvia Pinal and Joaquín Cordero star as the protagonists, while Eduardo Palomo and Ofelia Guilmáin star as the antagonists.

== Cast ==
- Silvia Pinal as Magda
- Joaquín Cordero as Emmanuel
- Eduardo Palomo as Fernando
- Ofelia Guilmáin as Virginia
- Augusto Benedico as Mateo
- Pilar Souza as Concepción
- Sergio Klainer as Atilio Greco
- Blanca Sánchez as Alicia
- Fernando Larrañaga as Nestor
- Eugenia Avendaño as Isabel
- Fernando Balzaretti as Simon
- Martha Roth as Amalia
- Martha Verduzco as Carmen
- Lourdes Munguía as Lourdes
- Wolf Rubinsky as Diego
- Rosita Salazar Arenas as Cecilia
- Polly as Pilar
- Marcelo Romo as Carlos
- Jorge Codiz as Daniel
