= El inocente =

- Written by: Luis Alcoriza
- Starring: Pedro Infante, Silvia Pinal, Sara García.
- Release date: 1956
- Country: Mexico
- Language: Spanish

El inocente ("The Innocent") is a 1956 Mexican film written by Luis Alcoriza and starring Pedro Infante, Silvia Pinal and Sara García.

After a quarrel with her boyfriend on New Year's Eve, Mane (Pinal) drives her car from Mexico City to Cuernavaca to meet her parents in their country house. The car breaks down in the highway and Mane has to ask for help. Mechanic Cruci (Infante) arrives and, after testing the car, offers Mane a ride on his motorcycle. Back in Mane's house, she invites him some drinks to celebrate New Year's Eve. They get drunk and, the morning after, Mane's parents arrive and find them sleeping together. Not knowing what happened, Mane and Cruci are forced to get married against their will.
