= ¿Quién? (TV series) =

- Genre: Telenovela
- Created by: Yolanda Vargas Dulché
- Directed by: Raúl Araiza Sr
- Starring: Silvia Pinal; Joaquín Cordero
- Country of origin: Mexico
- Original language: Spanish

Production
- Executive producer: Guillermo Diazayas

Original release
- Network: Canal de las Estrellas
- Release: 1973 – 1973

¿Quién? is a Mexican telenovela produced by Guillermo Diazayas for Televisa in 1973. Starring Silvia Pinal and Joaquín Cordero.

== Cast ==
- Silvia Pinal
- Joaquín Cordero
- Félix González
- Gustavo Rojo
- Miguel Manzano
