= Tristana (novel) =

1892 novel by Benito Pérez Galdós

Tristana is a novel by Spanish author Benito Pérez Galdós, first published in 1892.

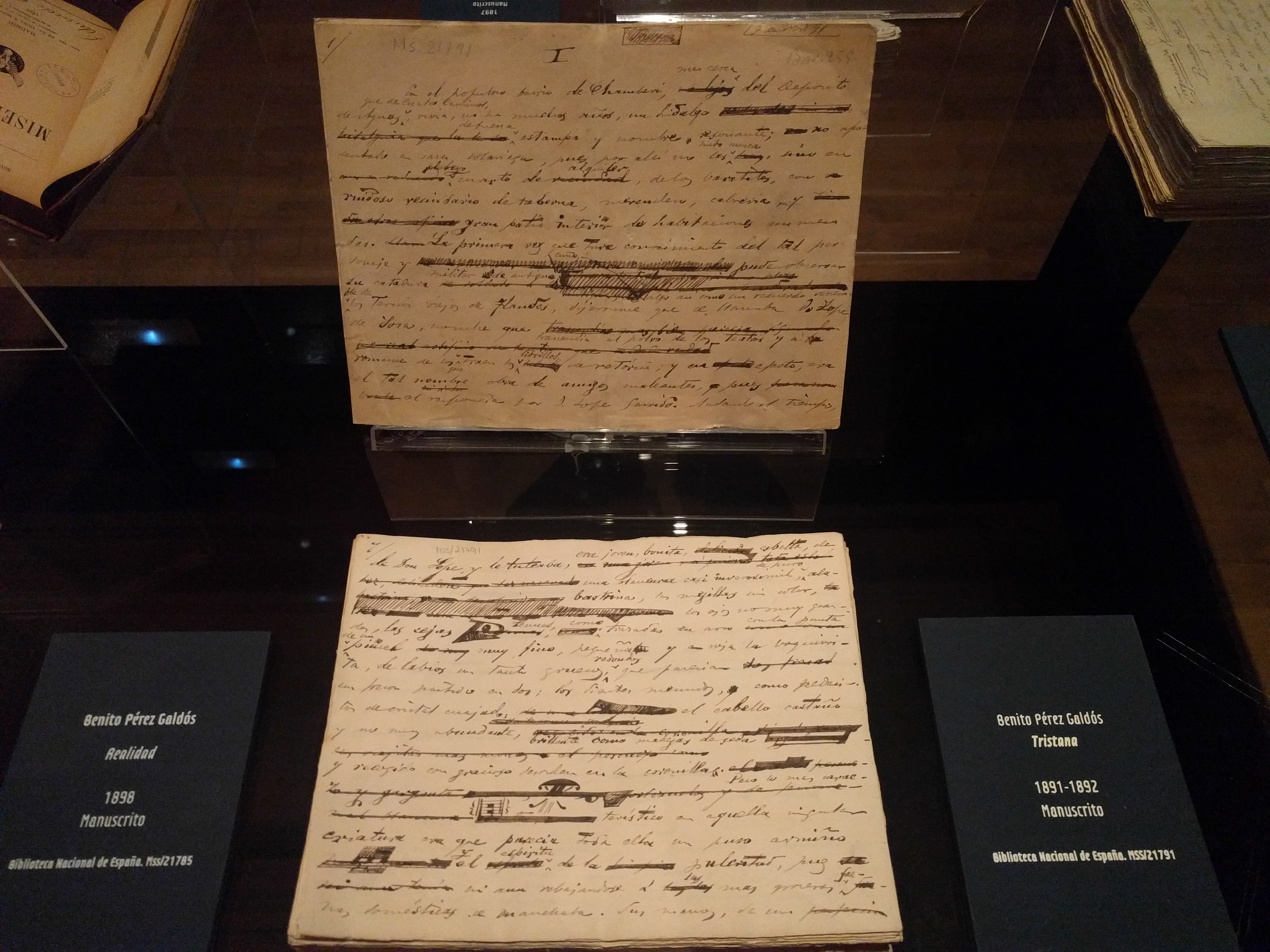
Manuscript of Tristana, 1892. Biblioteca Nacional de España.

A 1970 film based on the novel was directed by Luis Buñuel.

== Synopsis ==
Set in Chamberí, Madrid in the 19th century. After the death of Tristana's mother Josefina, she is taken in by an older family friend, Don Lope, who seduces her. Tristana, rebelling against this situation, meets and falls in love with the young Horacio. Horacio is a painter with traditional worldviews that clash with Tristana's feminist worldviews. Horacio leaves Madrid for a certain period of time, during which Tristana's leg is amputated, forcing her once again to be reliant on don Lope. When Horacio returns, the love between them is gone, and Horacio marries a different woman, while Tristana gives up her dreams of being an actress to be don Lope's wife.

== Development ==
In the original manuscript, don Lope's personality differs heavily from the published text: he is far more violent, emotional, and possessive.

== Analysis ==
Tristana's transformation in the novel is heavily tied to language: the novel begins with her being mute for four chapters; she then finally speaks the word "libertad" (liberty), and then begins to construct a new reality for women and herself, by inventing gendered words for professions that were not in common use in the nineteenth century, such as "abogada" (female lawyer) and "médica" (female doctor). She identifies with mute children, as she believes that like her, they have been deprived by society of their voice. From studying language, she develops feminist views and uses language to assert herself and the right of women to freedom.
