= Teatro Xicohténcatl =

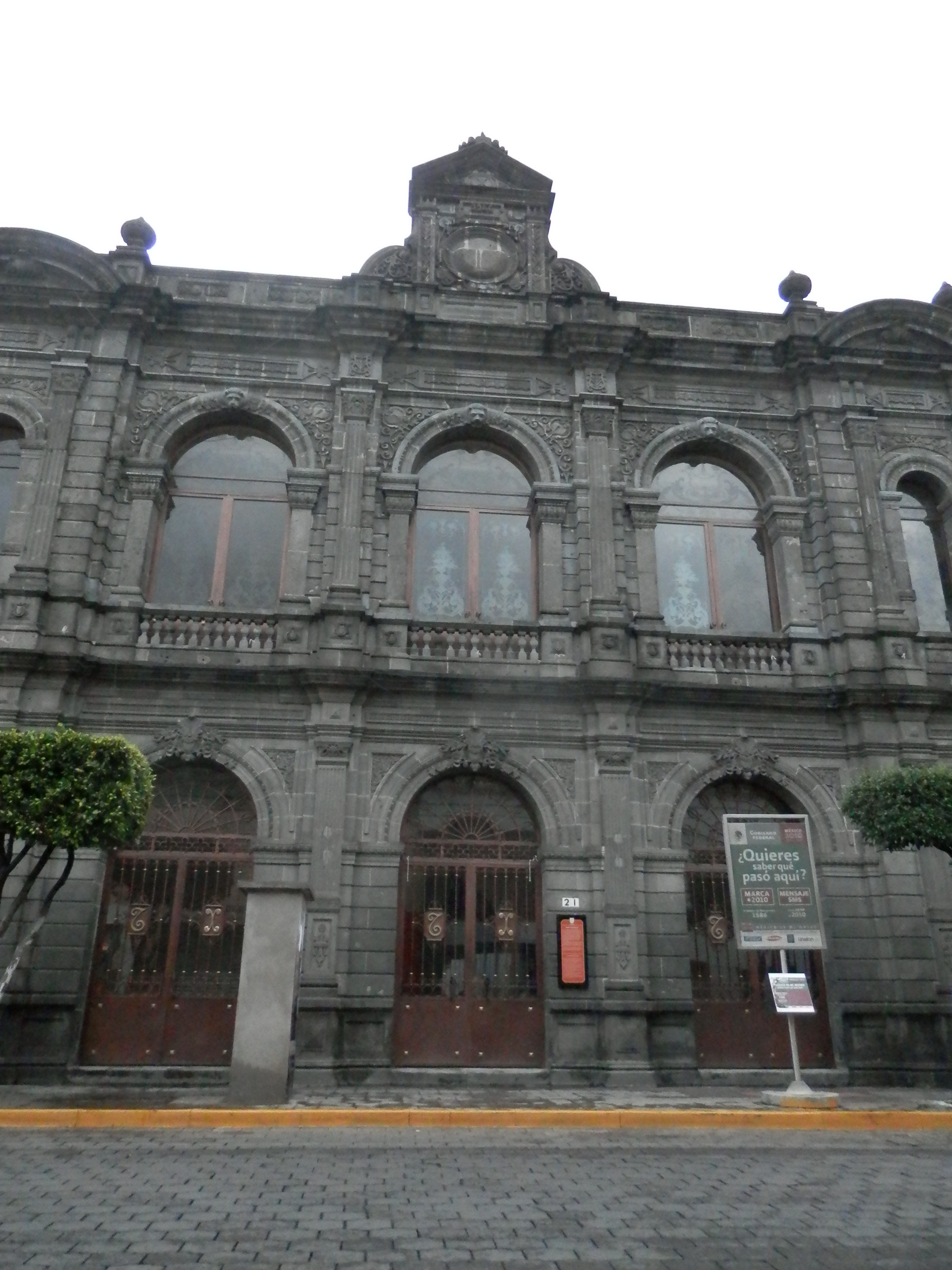
- Façade of the theatre in 2013

- Location within Tlaxcala Location within Mexico
- Address: Av. Juárez 21, Centro, Tlaxcala, Tlaxcala; Mexico
- Coordinates: 19°19′5.63″N 98°14′12.06″W
- Elevation: 2,239 m (7,346 ft)
- Type: Theatre

Construction
- Groundbreaking: 1 January 1870
- Opened: 5 May 1873

Website
- Teatro Xicohténcatl

The Teatro Xicohténcatl is a theatre located in the centre of the Mexican city of Tlaxcala de Xicohténcatl. (Note: Nahuatl pronunciation [ʃiːkoʔˈteːŋkatɬ]. Both the city and the theatre are named for Xicohtencatl Axayacatzin, a leader of the Nahua state of Tlaxcala at the time of the Spanish conquest of the Aztec Empire.) Construction began in 1870, and it opened to the public on 5 May 1873.

It has a maximum capacity of 320, with space for 138 spectators in the stalls, 30 on the balcony, 132 in boxes divided over two storeys, and seats for an additional 20.

The theatre has been managed by the Tlaxcala Institute of Culture (Instituto Tlaxcalteca de Cultura, ITC), an autonomous agency of the Tlaxcala State Government, since 1985.
