= Men and Noblemen =

1959 film directed by Giorgio Bianchi

- Directed by: Giorgio Bianchi
- Written by: Emo Bistolfi; Mario Guerra; Carlo Romano
- Story by: Marino Girolami; Sergio Corbucci; Camillo Mastrocinque
- Produced by: Emo Bistolfi
- Starring: Vittorio De Sica
- Cinematography: Tonino Delli Colli
- Music by: Nino Oliviero
- Release date: 1959
- Language: Italian

Men and Noblemen (Italian: Uomini e nobiluomini) is a 1959 Italian comedy film directed by Giorgio Bianchi and starring Vittorio De Sica.

== Cast ==
- Vittorio De Sica as Marquis Nicola Peccoli Macinelli di Afragola
- Antonio Cifariello as Mario Ludovici
- Silvia Pinal as Giovanna
- Mario Carotenuto as Commendator Sandrini
- Raffaele Pisu as Raffaele
- Alberto Talegalli as Frangipane
- Elke Sommer as Caterina
- Marco Tulli as Guidobaldo
- Maria Grazia Spina as Mario's seducer
- Francesca Benedetti as Amalia Cavicchioni
- Tiberio Murgia as the Pimp
- Carlo Pisacane as Beverello
- Gustavo Serena as Best man
- Bruno Smith as Best man
- Dori Dorika as Olga
