= A Place Near Heaven =

1952 film

- Directed by: Rogelio A. González
- Written by: Rogelio A. González; Gregorio Walerstein
- Produced by: Antonio Matouk; Gregorio Walerstein
- Starring: Pedro Infante; Marga López; Andrés Soler
- Cinematography: Agustín Martínez Solares
- Edited by: Rafael Ceballos
- Music by: Manuel Esperón
- Production company: Cinematográfica Filmex
- Release date: 22 August 1952
- Running time: 120 minutes
- Country: Mexico
- Language: Spanish

A Place Near Heaven (Spanish: Un rincón cerca del cielo) is a 1952 Mexican comedy drama film directed by Rogelio A. González and starring Pedro Infante, Marga López and Silvia Pinal. This film marked the film debut of the singer and actor Antonio Aguilar and was followed by a sequel filmed the same year, Now I Am Rich (alongside Irma Dorantes). It was shot at the San Angel Studios in Mexico City. The film's sets were designed by the art director Jorge Fernández.

== Synopsis ==
Pedro González moves to Mexico City but faces a number of struggles in the capital.

== Main cast ==
- Pedro Infante as Pedro González
- Marga López as Margarita
- Andrés Soler as Don Chema Pérez
- Antonio Aguilar as Catrín
- Silvia Pinal as Sonia Irina
- Luis Aceves Castañeda as Martín Araujo, el jefe
- Peque Navarro as Pepe
- Arturo Soto Rangel as Don Tenen
- Diana Ochoa as Supervisora oficina
- Guillermo Portillo Acosta as Borracho
- Juan Orraca as Don Antonio
- Mercedes Soler as Enfermera
- Joaquín García "Borolas" as Borracho
- Ricardo Camacho as Borracho

== Bibliography ==
- De la Mora, Sergio. Cinemachismo: Masculinities and Sexuality in Mexican Film. University of Texas Press, 2009.
