= Tristana (film) =

1970 film by Luis Buñuel

- Spanish theatrical release poster
- Directed by: Luis Buñuel
- Screenplay by: Luis Buñuel; Julio Alejandro
- Based on: Tristana by Benito Pérez Galdós
- Produced by: Luis Buñuel; Robert Dorfmann
- Starring: Catherine Deneuve; Fernando Rey; Franco Nero; Lola Gaos; Antonio Casas; Jesús Fernández
- Cinematography: José F. Aguayo
- Edited by: Pedro del Rey
- Production companies: Talía Film; Época Film; Selenia Cinematografica; Les Films Corona
- Distributed by: Mercurio Films S.A. (Spain); Valoria Films (France); Dear Film (Italy)
- Release dates: 18 March 1970 (Madrid); 29 March 1970 (Spain); 29 April 1970 (France); 27 August 1970 (Italy)
- Running time: 100 minutes
- Countries: Spain; France; Italy
- Languages: Spanish; French; Italian

Tristana is a 1970 drama film co-written, directed and produced by Luis Buñuel, and starring Catherine Deneuve, Fernando Rey, and Franco Nero. The screenplay by Buñuel and Julio Alejandro adapts an 1892 realist novel of the same name by Benito Pérez Galdós. It is a Spanish-French-Italian co-production filmed in Toledo, Buñuel's one-time home, and represents his return to his native country after several years living and working abroad. It earned positive acclaim from critics, and was nominated for Best Foreign-Language Film at the 43rd Academy Awards.

== Plot ==
The story is set in the late 1920s to early 1930s in the city of Toledo, Spain. Tristana is a young woman who, following the death of her mother, becomes a ward of notorious nobleman Don Lope Garrido. Despite his advancing age, Don Lope refuses to change his playboy lifestyle, while maintaining strong yet increasingly-antiquated attitudes about honour, chivalry and women. Claiming to defend the weak from corrupt institutions (while expressing support for leftist politics), Don Lope nonetheless preys on his new ward, entranced by her beauty and innocence. He thus treats her as wife as well as daughter from the age of 19, unbeknownst to the outside world.

While Tristana initially accepts the arrangement, by 21, she starts finding her voice, to demand to study music, art and other subjects with which she wishes to become independent. She chafes under Don Lope, who thinks women are untrustworthy and should be kept at home. While sneaking out of the house against Lope's wishes, she meets Horacio, a young artist from Catalonia. The two fall in love and Horacio asks her to come and live with him in Barcelona, but she remains apprehensive because of the Don's inescapable presence. Horacio confronts Don Lope outside his apartment, Lope slaps him and challenges him to a duel, and Horacio responds by simply punching him in the face. He and Tristana leave the following day.

Two years later, Tristana returns, having suddenly fallen ill due to a tumor in her right leg. She demands to be remanded to Don Lope's house so she can die there. Tristana survives, though her leg is amputated, which changes her prospects. She breaks up with Horacio and seemingly reinstates her previous relationship with Don Lope, but is now much more independent and openly defiant. Don Lope, whose health problems have only worsened, suddenly inherits money from his sister, which Tristana covets. She agrees to have a marriage of convenience with Lope in order to, as a local priest describes, "correct a previously sinful situation," but makes it clear she has no desire for a romantic or sexual relationship.

One night, Lope suffers a heart attack in bed. Tristana pretends to get help until he's fallen unconscious and finishes him off by opening the window to the winter cold. The film ends with a montage of scenes playing back in reverse, ending at the moment Don Lope first seduced Tristana.

== Cast ==
- Catherine Deneuve as Tristana
- Fernando Rey as Don Lope Garrido
- Franco Nero as Horacio
- Lola Gaos as Saturna
- Antonio Casas as Don Cosme
- Jesús Fernández as Saturno
- Denise Menace as Armanda
- Vicente Solar as Don Ambrosio
- José Calvo as The Bellringer
- Fernando Cebrián as Dr. Miquis
- Antonio Ferrandis as Comprador
- José María Caffarel as Don Zenón
- Cándida Losada as Ciudadana
- Joaquín Pamplona as Don Joaquín
- María Paz Pondal as Muchacha
- Juanjo Menéndez as Don Cándido
- José Blanch as Commandante
- Sergio Mendizábal as Schoolmaster

== Production ==
Buñuel first began working on Tristana in 1962 after Spanish censors rejected his script Secuestro. Buñuel suggested adapting Benito Pérez Galdós's novel instead to his producers at Epoca and was paid $30,000 to write the screenplay. Buñuel and Julio Alejandro wrote the script in December 1962 and updated the novel's setting to the period between the late 1920s to early 1930s. Buñuel and Epoca submitted their script to the Spanish censors in the spring of 1963, hoping to begin shooting in the summer. At the last minute, the Ministry of Culture rejected the script because of its depiction of duelling and Buñuel made Diary of a Chambermaid instead.

In December 1968, Buñuel decided to return to Spain after being allowed back into the Catholic Church. When he returned, producers from Epoca approached him about reviving Tristana. Buñuel was initially uninterested and wanted to instead film his script for The Monk, which would have starred Jeanne Moreau, Peter O'Toole and Omar Sharif. But producers at Epoca managed to find funding from Italian and French investors and secure the newly built Siena Studios in Madrid, convincing Buñuel to agree to the project. Buñuel and Alejandro quickly finished their fourth draft of the screenplay.

Buñuel wanted Tristana to be his triumphant return to Spain after living in Mexico for several decades and worked hard on the film. Buñuel travelled to Spain in the spring of 1969 to begin work on the film, and was immediately sidetracked by the Spanish censors. Spain's Franco government made it difficult for the notorious and outspoken atheist Buñuel to get his films approved. However, Minister of Information Manuel Fraga Iribarne was known to be more liberal than past Ministers and told Buñuel that he would approve the script only if Buñuel promised to not change the script during the film's shooting. Buñuel refused, stating that the script was merely a blueprint. Eventually Buñuel got his and Fraga's mutual friend Rafael Mendez to act as a go-between and convince Fraga to approve the script.

Buñuel's French investors insisted that Catherine Deneuve be cast as Tristana and his Italian investors wanted young heartthrob Franco Nero to play Horacio. Filming began in September 1969. Actress Vanessa Redgrave was often on the film's set after recently divorcing Tony Richardson for Nero, which caused Nero to often be late or distracted during filming. The film's plot has many similarities to Buñuel's earlier film Viridiana and the character of Don Lope is partially based on Buñuel's father, who was also a "señorito" (an adult who never worked a day in his life but lives comfortably, or even luxuriously, thanks to an inheritance). Buñuel based much of Tristana's schoolgirl innocence on memories of his younger sister Conchita.

== Differences from the novel ==
Buñuel was quite critical of Pérez Galdós' novel despite being a fan of the author, finding it kitschy, predictable, and among the author's worst works. Nonetheless, he believed that it would make an excellent film adaptation, though made some notable changes.

In the novel, Tristana resignedly marries Don Lope in order for him to receive his inheritance. Another difference from the novel is Saturno's increased role—barely mentioned in the novel, he is Tristana's third love interest in the film.

== Release ==
The film premiered in Madrid on March 18, 1970, and opened in theatres on March 29. It opened in France on April 28 after a screening at the Hyères Film Festival, and in Italy in June. In the United States, it screened at the New York Film Festival in September and had a limited release in New York City and Los Angeles later that year. It also screened out of the main competition at the 1970 Cannes Film Festival.

== Reception ==
Tristana has an approval rating of 94% on review aggregator website Rotten Tomatoes, based on 34 reviews, and an average rating of 8.4/10. Metacritic assigned the film a weighted average score of 93 out of 100, based on 7 critics, indicating "universal acclaim".

=== Awards and nominations ===
| Award | Year | Category | Nominee | Result |
|---|---|---|---|---|
| Academy Award | 1971 | Best Foreign-Language Film | Tristana | Nominated |
| Fotogramas de Plata | 1971 | Best Spanish Movie Performer | Fernando Rey | Won |
| Fotogramas de Plata | 1971 | Best Spanish Movie Performer | Lola Gaos | Nominated |
| National Syndicate of Spectacle | 1970 | Best Film | Tristana | Won |
| National Syndicate of Spectacle | 1970 | Best Male Star | Fernando Rey | Won |
| National Syndicate of Spectacle | 1970 | Best Supporting Actress | Lola Gaos | Won |
| National Syndicate of Spectacle | 1970 | Best Cinematography | José F. Aguayo | Won |
| Premios CEC | 1971 | Best Film | Tristana | Won |
| Premios CEC | 1971 | Best Director | Luis Buñuel | Won |
| Premios CEC | 1971 | Best Actor | Fernando Rey | Won |
| Premios ACE | 1971 | Cinema - Best Actor | Fernando Rey | Won |
| Sant Jordi Award | 1970 | Best Film | Luis Buñuel | Won |
| Sant Jordi Award | 1970 | Best Performance in a Spanish Film | Fernando Rey | Won |

== See also ==
- List of submissions to the 43rd Academy Awards for Best Foreign Language Film
- List of Spanish submissions for the Academy Award for Best Foreign Language Film
