= The Exterminating Angel =

1962 film by Luis Buñuel

- Original film poster
- Spanish: El ángel exterminador
- Directed by: Luis Buñuel
- Screenplay by: Luis Buñuel
- Story by: Luis Alcoriza; Luis Buñuel
- Produced by: Gustavo Alatriste
- Starring: Silvia Pinal; Enrique Rambal; Lucy Gallardo; Claudio Brook
- Cinematography: Gabriel Figueroa
- Edited by: Carlos Savage Jr.
- Music by: Raúl Lavista
- Production companies: Producciones Gustavo Alatriste; Estudios Churubusco
- Distributed by: Altura
- Release dates: 16 May 1962 (Cannes); 1 October 1964 (Mexico)
- Running time: 93 minutes
- Country: Mexico
- Language: Spanish

The Exterminating Angel (Spanish: El ángel exterminador) is a 1962 Mexican surrealist psychological drama film written and directed by Luis Buñuel. Starring Silvia Pinal and produced by Pinal's then-husband Gustavo Alatriste, the film tells the story of a group of wealthy guests who find themselves unable to leave after a lavish dinner party, and the chaos that ensues. Sharply satirical and allegorical, it contains a depiction of the aristocracy that suggests they "harbor savage instincts and unspeakable secrets".

In 2004, The New York Times included the film in a list of "The Best 1,000 Movies Ever Made". The film was adapted into an opera of the same name by Thomas Adès in 2016.

== Plot summary ==
After a night at the opera, Edmundo and Lucía Nóbile host eighteen wealthy acquaintances at a dinner party at their mansion. The servants inexplicably begin to leave as the guests are about to arrive; by the time the meal is over, only Julio, the majordomo, is left. Lucía cancels a planned surprise involving a bear and three sheep upon discovering that guest Sergio Russell does not like jokes, but there are a few strange occurrences, such as the guests somehow entering the mansion and going upstairs twice, Edmundo repeating his toast to the opera singer Silvia, and Cristián Ugalde and Leandro Gomez greeting each other three times (as strangers, cordially, and antagonistically).

The guests mingle before adjourning to the salon to listen to Blanca play a Paradisi keyboard sonata. When she finishes, she says she is tired, and several other guests indicate they are about to go home, but no one does. Instead, without discussing it, the guests and hosts settle in and spend the night in the salon, preventing Lucía from sneaking off for a tryst with Colonel Alvaro Aranda.

In the morning, it is discovered that Sergio is unconscious. The hosts and some of the guests wonder why no one attempted to leave the night before. A few guests try to exit the salon, but they all turn back or become distressed and stop before crossing the threshold. When Julio brings some leftovers for breakfast, he is trapped as well.

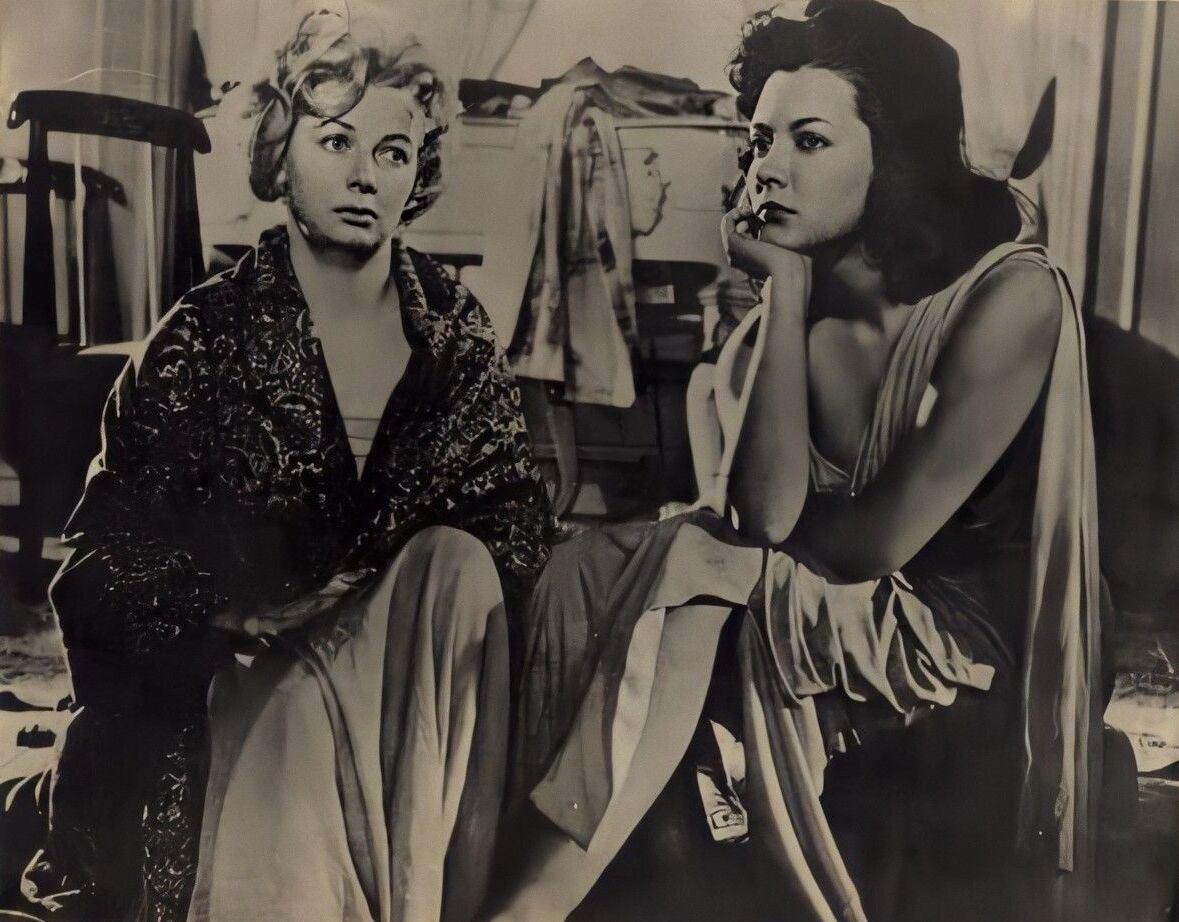
Patricia Morán and Ofelia Montesco in a publicity still for the film

By that evening, everyone is on edge. They are using a closet as a toilet and have run out of clean water. Raúl blames Eduardo for their plight, but Leticia defends the host. Sergio dies during the night, and Dr. Carlos Conde and Alvaro hide the corpse in a closet.

A crowd of onlookers, police, and soldiers gathers outside the gates of the mansion over the following days; no one is able to enter, although there is no physical barrier. The trapped individuals get water by tapping into a pipe in the wall, but their good manners continue to deteriorate. A growing number of them become ill, and Dr. Conde has no medicine until Edmundo shows him a stash of opiates, which some of the guests sneak for themselves.

At a particularly heated moment, the trapped group sees the three sheep and bear roaming the mansion. The sheep wander into the salon, where they are caught and roasted on a fire in the middle of the room. Eduardo and Beatriz, a young engaged couple, kill themselves in a closet.

One night, all of the Nóbiles' servants are drawn back to the mansion. Inside, Raúl has convinced most of the other guests that their predicament will end if Edmundo dies. Dr. Conde attempts to reason with them, and a fight breaks out, the doctor assisted by Alvaro and Julio. Edmundo and Leticia come out of the curtained-off area they have begun to inhabit, and Edmundo offers to take his own life. He produces a small pistol he had hidden, but Leticia tells him to wait. She notices that all of the people and furniture are in the same spot as the night of the party, and has Blanca play the end of the piano sonata and everyone repeat the conversation that followed. This time, when Blanca says she is tired, the group can leave the salon and then the mansion. The members of the small crowd outside see them exit and are able to pass through the gates to greet them.

To give thanks for their salvation, most of the group from the salon attend a Te Deum service. Afterwards, neither the clergy nor the churchgoers can leave the cathedral. The military fires on a group of people waiting in front of the cathedral while a flock of sheep enters the building.

== Cast ==
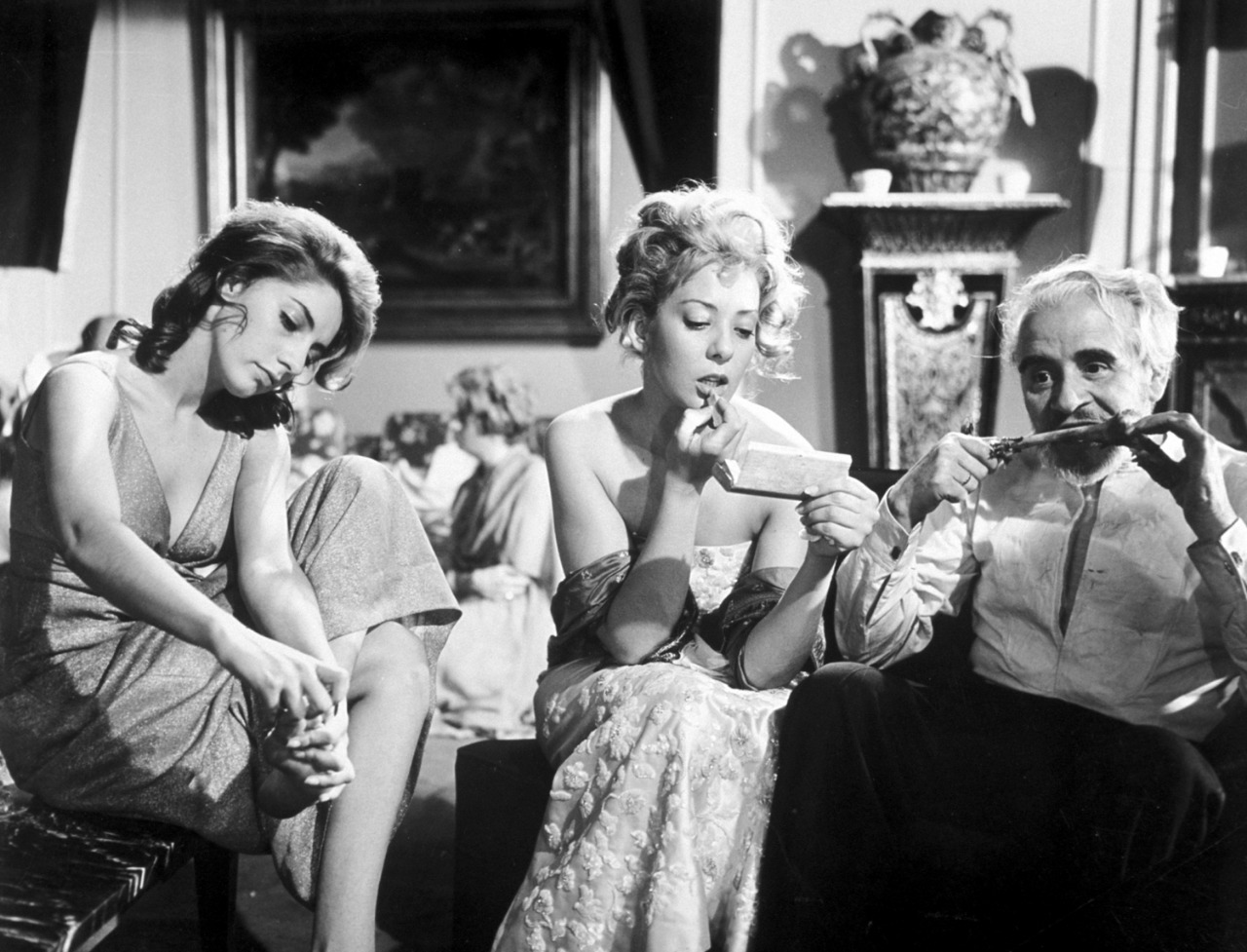
(from left to right): Jacqueline Andere, Silvia Pinal, and Enrique García Álvarez in a publicity photograph for the film.

The Trapped

- Silvia Pinal as Leticia, nicknamed "La Valkiria" ("The Valkyrie")
- Jacqueline Andere as Alicia de Roc, Alberto's much younger wife
- José Baviera as Leandro Gomez, who lives in New York
- Augusto Benedico as Dr. Carlos Conde
- Luis Beristáin as Cristián Ugalde, Rita's husband, who has an ulcer and is a Freemason
- Antonio Bravo as Sergio Russell, an older guest who does not like jokes and is the first to die
- Claudio Brook as Julio, the majordomo
- César del Campo as Colonel Alvaro Aranda, who is having an affair with Lucía
- Rosa Elena Durgel as Silvia, an opera singer
- Lucy Gallardo as Lucía de Nóbile, Edmundo's wife and the hostess of the party
- Enrique García Álvarez as Alberto Roc, Alicia's elderly husband, who is a conductor and a Freemason
- Ofelia Guilmáin as Juana Avila, Francisco's overprotective sister
- Nadia Haro Oliva as Ana Maynar, who was once in a train wreck and is interested in Kabbalah
- Tito Junco as Raúl, who walks with a cane
- Xavier Loyá as Francisco Avila, Juana's brother
- Xavier Massé as Eduardo, Beatriz's fiancé
- Ofelia Montesco as Beatriz, Eduardo's fiancée
- Patricia Morán as Rita Ugalde, Christian's wife, who is pregnant
- Patricia de Morelos as Blanca, a pianist
- Bertha Moss as Leonora, a woman who has cancer and is Dr. Conde's patient
- Enrique Rambal as Edmundo Nóbile, Lucía's husband and the host of the party

The Rest

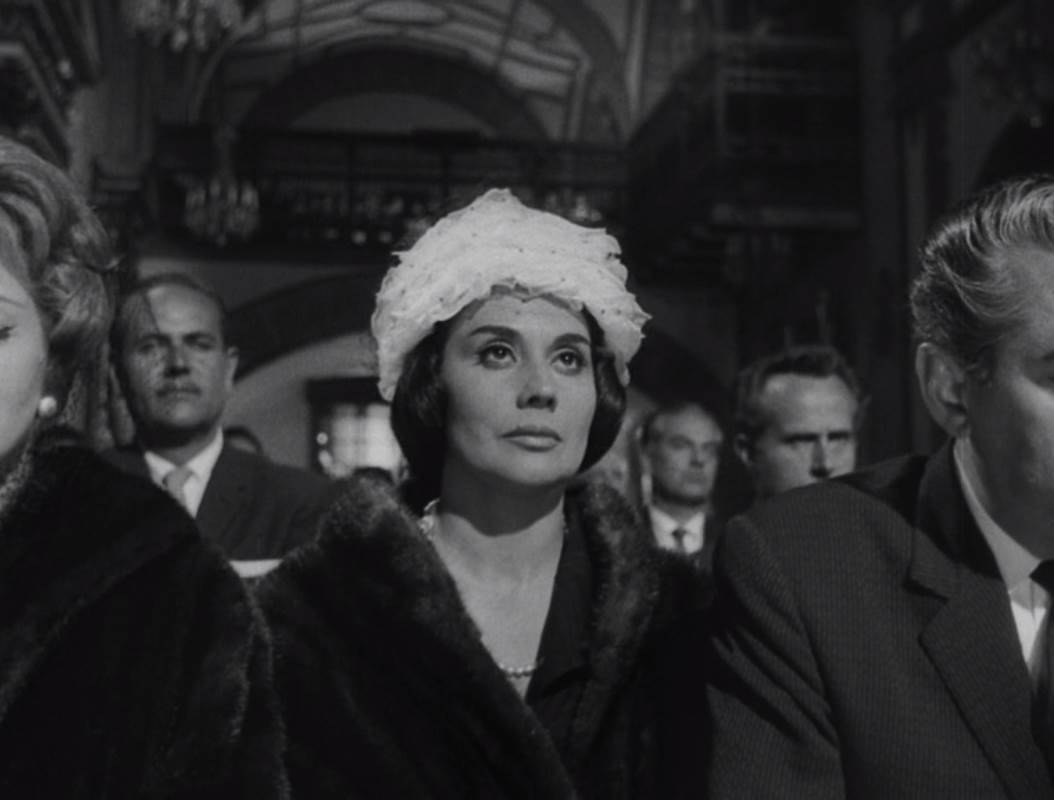
Rita Macedo in a still for the film

- Pancho Córdova as Lucas, the doorman, who is the first servant to leave
- Ángel Merino as the waiter who trips and drops a tray of food
- Luis Lomelí as the mayor's representative
- Guillermo Álvarez Bianchi as Pablo, the chef
- Elodia Hernández as Camila, the older maid
- Florencio Castelló as the bald waiter
- Eric del Castillo as Deacon Sampson, who tutors and cares for the Ugalde children and takes part in the Te Deum service at the end of the film
- Chel López as the military official who tells the mayor's representative that his men were unable to enter the mansion
- David Hayat (credited as David Hayyad Cohen) as Pablo's sous-chef

Uncredited

- Rita Macedo as a churchgoer
- Janet Alcoriza as the younger maid
- Roberto Meyer as the "crazy" onlooker who is not allowed to try to get inside the mansion

== Production ==
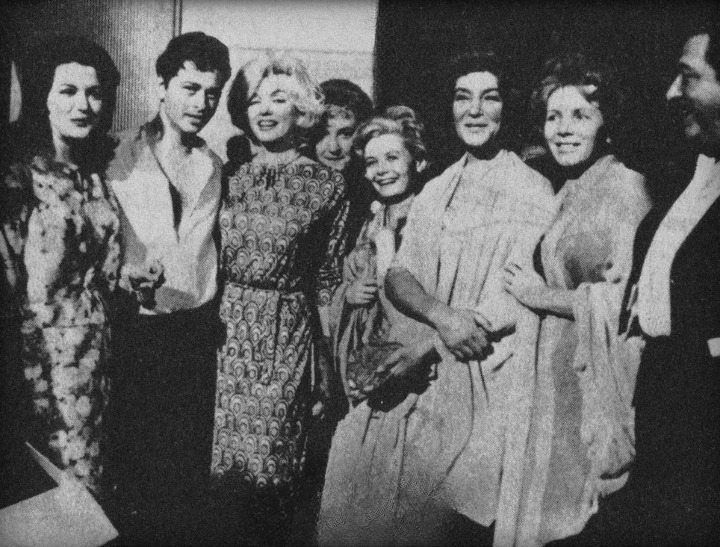
(from left to right) Ofelia Montesco, Xavier Loyá, Marilyn Monroe, unknown person in the back, Patricia Morán, Bertha Moss, Nadia Haro Oliva, and José Baviera on the set of the film.

The film was shot in less than six weeks, from January 29 to March 9, 1962. American actress Marilyn Monroe traveled to Mexico during that period, and her trip included a visit to Churubusco Studios, where the film was being made. She visited the set and met Buñuel, cinematographer Gabriel Figueroa, and the cast.

In an interview with Jose de la Colina and Tomas Perez Turrent, Buñuel claimed the dream sequence with a disembodied hand had originally been conceived for the American horror film The Beast with Five Fingers (1946), for which he'd contributed an uncredited story treatment during a sojourn at Warner Bros. in the 1940s.

Rita Macedo was originally cast as Lucía, but dropped out shortly after the start of filming due to an unexpected pregnancy. Buñuel could not afford to reshoot the church sequence with Lucy Gallardo as Lucía, thus giving Macedo an unintentional cameo appearance.

== Release and reception ==
The Exterminating Angel premiered at the 1962 Cannes Film Festival, and was released in theaters in Mexico on October 1, 1964, to critical acclaim.

On the review aggregator website Rotten Tomatoes, the film has an approval rating of 93% based on 27 reviews, with an average score of 9.0/10. The site's consensus reads: "Societal etiquette devolves into depravity in Luis Buñuel's existential comedy, effectively playing the absurdity of civilization for mordant laughs".

=== Awards ===
This film received the International Federation of Film Critics (FIPRESCI) Prize at the 1962 Cannes Film Festival. At the 1963 Bodil Awards, it won Best Non-European Film.

=== Home media ===
The Criterion Collection released The Exterminating Angel on DVD on 10 February 2009, and on Blu-ray in November 2016.

== Analysis ==
=== Social class ===
Though Buñuel never explained how to interpret the film, leaving it to each viewer to decide, American film critic Roger Ebert wrote a lengthy interpretation of the film as symbolic of class conflict: "The dinner guests represent the ruling class in Franco's Spain. Having set a banquet table for themselves by defeating the workers in the Spanish Civil War, they sit down for a feast, only to find it never ends. They're trapped in their own bourgeois cul-de-sac. Increasingly resentful at being shut off from the world outside, they grow mean and restless; their worst tendencies are revealed".

Scholar Robert Stam said in his book Reflexivity in Film and Literature: From Don Quixote to Jean-Luc Godard that the film "is structured on the comic formula of a slow descent from normality into anarchy ... The 'Angel' executes a mission of social justice, an apocalyptic laying low of the noble and the powerful".

=== Influence on the horror genre ===
In a 2020 piece on the horror film website Bloody Disgusting, Samuel Pierce noted parallels between The Exterminating Angel and contemporary horror cinema, writing: "Within the film's already fascinating plot, there's plenty of poignant social commentary that will be just as familiar to horror fans. Though the film can be interpreted a number of ways, many of its themes are undeniable and as relevant today as they ever were. We see isolation drive madness. We see tribes form in times of strife. We see murder become more and more appealing. More than anything, however, The Exterminating Angel explores the hypocrisy of the social elite and the thin strands of society that keep them from utter depravity".

Rather than a precursor to many contemporary horror films, some critics have classified The Exterminating Angel as a horror film itself. For example, Jonathan Romney of The Guardian called it a straightforward "claustrophobic horror story", and film scholar Jonathan Rosenbaum classified it as "comic horror".

== Cultural references ==
- Cabaret Voltaire named the intro and outro tracks of their 1994 album The Conversation "Exterminating Angel".
- The British sitcom One Foot in the Grave broadcast the episode "The Exterminating Angel" in 1995, including a scene where several characters are trapped in a conservatory.
- The Creatures recorded the song "Exterminating Angel" for their 1999 album Anima Animus.
- The 2002 Buffy the Vampire Slayer episode "Older and Far Away" references the film when a set of characters is unable to leave a house after a party. Initially, the characters seem psychologically unable to leave, but later they desire to leave and physically cannot due to a spell.
- Woody Allen's 2011 film Midnight in Paris has the main character, Gil, travel back in time to 1920s Paris and suggest a story to a perplexed young Buñuel about guests who arrive for a dinner party and cannot leave. Allen references the film again in Rifkin's Festival (2020).
- Thomas Adès' 2016 opera of the same name is based on this film. A 2024 revision (directed by Calixto Bieito) notably adds cannibalism, a plot point which Buñuel had originally considered (and later regretted not including).
- Composer Stephen Sondheim announced a collaboration with playwright David Ives in October 2014, developing a new musical with a plot inspired by both The Exterminating Angel and Buñuel's 1972 film The Discreet Charm of the Bourgeoisie. Projected openings were deferred and production ceased at some point, but the composer held a September 2021 reading for Square One. Following Sondheim's death, Ives announced the musical, renamed Here We Are, which had a world premiere in September 2023 at The Shed.
- In The Walking Dead: Daryl Dixon episode "El Sacrificio," Carol Peletier watches The Exterminating Angel with Antonio.

== See also ==
- L'Àngel exterminador, 1895 sculpture by Josep Llimona i Bruguera located in the cemetery of Comillas, Cantabria, Spain.
- The Discreet Charm of the Bourgeoisie (French: Le Charme discret de la bourgeoisie) – a 1972 Buñuel film with a similar premise and themes
- The Last Days (Spanish: Los Últimos Días) – a 2013 Spanish film in which humanity becomes scared to go outside
