= Un extraño en la escalera =

1955 film

- Directed by: Tulio Demicheli
- Written by: Tulio Demicheli; Ladislas Fodor (novel)
- Produced by: Gregorio Walerstein
- Starring: Arturo de Córdova
- Cinematography: Jack Draper
- Edited by: Rafael Ceballos
- Release date: 4 March 1955
- Running time: 95 minutes
- Country: Mexico
- Language: Spanish

Un extraño en la escalera ("A Stranger on the Stairs") is a 1955 Mexican drama film directed by Tulio Demicheli. It was entered into the 1955 Cannes Film Festival.

== Cast ==
- Arturo de Córdova
- Silvia Pinal
- José María Linares-Rivas
- Andrés Soler
- Bertica Serrano
- Sonja Marrero
- Luciano de Pazos
- César Pomar
