= Three-Cornered Hat =

Three-Cornered Hat may refer to:

- The Three-Cornered Hat, a 1919 Spanish ballet
- The Three-Cornered Hat (film), a 1935 Italian comedy film
- The Three-Cornered Hat (novel), an 1874 novel by Pedro Antonio de Alarcón
- The Three-Cornered Hat (album), an album by André Previn, performing the music of the ballet
- Tricorne, a three-cornered hat popular during the 18th century
