= La farsa amorosa =

1933 opera by Riccardo Zandonai

- Opera buffa by Riccardo Zandonai
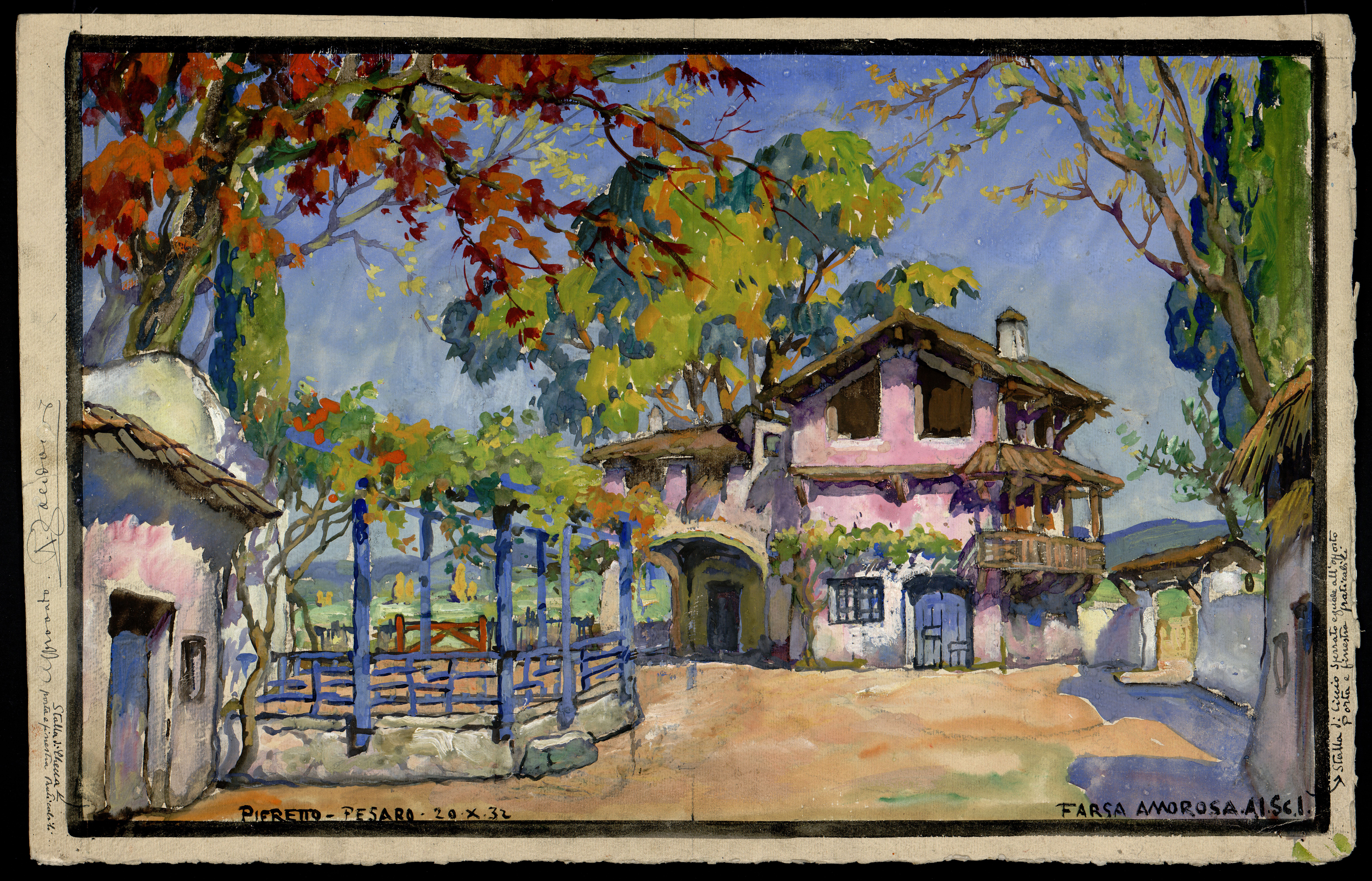
- Set design by Pieretto Bianco for act 1, scene 1, 1932
- Librettist: Arturo Rossato
- Language: Italian
- Based on: Pedro Antonio de Alarcón's El sombrero de tres picos
- Premiere: 22 February 1933; Teatro dell'Opera di Roma

La farsa amorosa is an opera in three acts by Italian composer Riccardo Zandonai.

The opera is on a comic subject, and was an attempt to revitalize the opera buffa tradition which flourished in Italy during the 18th and early 19th centuries.

The story is based on the novel El sombrero de tres picos, (1874) by Pedro Antonio de Alarcón, which was the basis of Manuel de Falla's ballet The Three-Cornered Hat and Hugo Wolf's opera Der Corregidor. The libretto by Zandonai's frequent collaborator Arturo Rossato relocates the action to Lombardy but retains Spanish names. The cast uniquely includes two love-lorn donkeys, Ciccio and Checca.

== Performance history ==
La farsa amorosa, which turned out to be the composer's last completed opera, premiered on 22 February 1933 at the Teatro dell'Opera di Roma, conducted by Marcello Govoni.

== Roles ==
Roles, voice types, premiere cast
Role	Voice type	Premiere cast, 22 February 1933 Conductor: Riccardo Zandonai
Don Ferrante	baritone	Carmelo Maugeri
Donna Mercedes	mezzo-soprano	Sara Ungaro
Frulla	tenor	Alessio De Paolis
Giacomino	tenor	Adelio Zagonara
Lucia	soprano	Mafalda Favero
Orsola	mezzo-soprano	Agnese Dubbini
Renzo	tenor	Nino Bertelli
Spingarda	bass	Salvatore Baccaloni
