= Achille Broutin =

Achille Broutin (1860–1918) was a French fencing master and a collector of weapons who emigrated to Spain.

== Biography ==
Achille Broutin (named Aquilès in Spain) was born in Metz in 1860. He was the son of fencing master Emmanuel Broutin and dressmaker Marie-Louise Pasquier. Fencing master C. Leon Broutin was one of his brothers.

He left France in 1863 because of a duel between his father Emmanuel and a person close to the Emperor Napoleon III's court.

Pupil of his father Emmanuel (himself pupil of the famous Jean-Louis Michel), he was attaché in his youth to the Queen Isabella II of Spain's secretaryship. He put an end prematurely to his fencing master's career because of his marriage with Maria de Torres y Kruz (Lisbon 1852-Donostia-San Sebastian 1920). His peers of fencing said of him that he was very elegant and "toucheur".

After the falling, in 1870, he came back to Paris every winter with his family and so he could participate in fencing tournaments.

An eminent horseman and cultured historian, he proceeded his father's collection of weapons with his pupils' presents and purchases to the Hôtel Drouot in Paris. His widow left 13,000 pieces to the San Telmo Museum of Donostia - San Sebastian in 1923.

He died without descent in San Sebastián, in 1918.
