= Marqués de Alta Villa =

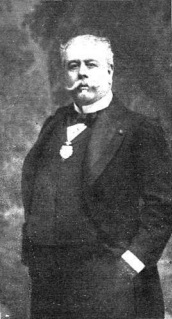
The Marqués de Alta Villa; photograph by Kaulak

José Ramiro de la Puente y González Nandín, Marqués de Alta Villa sometimes Altavilla (28 April 1845 in Reina del Bétis, Séville – 16 December 1909 in Madrid) was a Spanish grandee and writer on Madrid, exiled for much of the later part of his life in Paris.

== Exile in Paris ==
He acquired the château of Savigny-sur-Orge on the death of the former owner maréchale Davout, and there received from 1869 to 1876 the court of Isabella II in exile. He also frequented the Queen's own property, the former Hôtel Basilewski on avenue Kléber, renamed the Palais de Castille, which was the centre of the Bourbon Spanish exile community in Paris. Increasingly he came to serve as a powerful secretary to the exiled court of Queen. It was during this period, he became interested in various topics such as agricultural science, opera singing, as well as continuing more conventional aristocratic pursuits such as fencing and hunting. The Queen returned to Spain in 1874-1876 following the Bourbon restoration of her son Alfonso XII but Alta Villa continued to serve the Queen in Paris.

He was granted the papal title of marchese de Alta Villa del Casale Monferrato Piedmont, on October 9, 1880.

== Fencing ==
He was a noted fencer and espadachín and wrote the preface for C. Leon Broutin's guide El arte de la esgrima of 1894.

== Music ==
He took music lessons from Giovanni Lucantoni and singing lessons from Anna de La Grange and Madame Ferrari.

== Works ==
- Don Ramiro de la Puente y González Nandín. Guía oficial de España 1904
