= Plaza de Isabel II (disambiguation) =

Plaza de Isabel II is a historic public square in Madrid, Spain.

Plaza de Isabel II may also refer to:

- Plaza de Isabel II (Santa Cruz de Tenerife)
- Plaza de Isabel II (Albacete), in Albacete
