= Diary of a Witness =

1859 book by Pedro Antonio de Alarcón

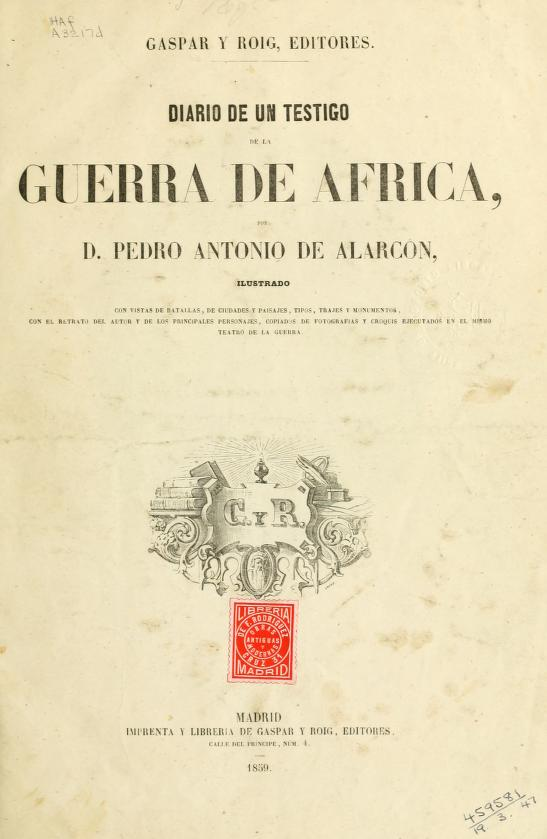
- Title page
- Author: Pedro Antonio de Alarcón
- Original title: Diario de un testigo de la guerra de África
- Translator: Bern Keating
- Illustrator: Francisco Ortego
- Language: Spanish
- Subject: Hispano-Moroccan War
- Publisher: Gaspar y Roig
- Publication date: 1859
- Publication place: Spain
- English publication date: 1988
- Pages: 317

Diary of a Witness: Diary of a Witness to the War in Africa (Spanish: Diario de un testigo de la guerra de África) is an 1859 autobiographical work by the Spanish writer Pedro Antonio de Alarcón. It is an account of the Hispano-Moroccan War, told from a patriotic Spanish perspective.

Alarcón had enlisted for the war after his play El hijo pródigo became a failure. The book was compiled from Alarcón's travel writings originally published through the magazine El Museo Universal with illustrations by Francisco Ortego. It was published in English translation by Bern Keating in 1988.

Merriam-Webster's Encyclopedia of Literature calls Diary of a Witness "a masterpiece of description". Eric Calderwood analyses the book's impact in his monograph Colonial al-Andalus, where he describes it as "the most famous account of the war that marked the beginning of Spanish colonialism in Morocco".
