= Alessio De Paolis =

Italian opera singer

Alessio De Paolis (9 March 1893 – 5 March 1964) was an Italian operatic tenor who specialized in character roles. He was a prominent member of the Metropolitan Opera in New York City where he sang from 1938 to 1964. At the Met De Paolis performed 51 different roles, primarily in the Italian and French repertoires, in a remarkable 1555 performances. In 1931, De Paolis created the role of Monsieur Le Beau in Ermanno Wolf-Ferrari's opera La vedova scaltra; in 1933 that of Frulla in Riccardo Zandonai's opera La farsa amorosa; and in 1936 and that of Christian in Franco Alfano's Cyrano de Bergerac.

De Paolis also performed in a number of commercial opera recordings. These include a famous 1959 RCA recording of Puccini's Turandot with Birgit Nilsson and Jussi Björling in which he sings the role of the Emperor Altoum.
