= María del Carmen Machín y Ortiz de Zárate =

Spanish courtier

María del Carmen Machín y Ortiz de Zárate, Marquesa de los Remedios (1805-1878), was a Spanish courtier. She was the lady-in-waiting and the Aya (royal governess) of queen Isabella II of Spain and her sister Infanta Luisa Fernanda, and in the next generation, the royal governess of king Alfonso XII and his sisters the Infantas Isabel, Pilar, Eulalia and Paz.

== Life and career ==
María del Carmen was a personal friend and confidante of queen regent of Maria Christina of the Two Sicilies, and she was appointed as the camarista of her daughters, queen Isabella II of Spain and Infanta Luisa Fernanda in 1832. Her sister Maria de los Dolores had in her turn been appointed camarista of the queen regent the year prior.

On October 1840, Maria Christina was deposed and exiled by General Espartero, who appointed Agustín Argüelles and Juana de Vega as the teacher and governess of the two royal children. On 7 October 1841, a group of officers supported by the exiled Maria Christina attacked the Royal Palace in Madrid, under the leadership of Diego de León and Manuel Gutiérrez de la Concha, in an attempt to kidnap the queen and her sister on the assignment of their mother. The kidnap attempt failed, but several of the ladies-in-waiting in service at the occasion: María del Carmen, Rosa Fidalgo, Cristina Sorróndegui and Josefa Blake, were accused by Espartero to have participated in the plot, siding with the queen mother against him. All the four ladies-in-waitings were arrested and sentenced to three years imprisonment on 28 October for their involvement.

María del Carmen was a personal friend of Isabella II. She was appointed to the position of Azafata for the queen's two children, Alfonso XII and his sister, in 1857, and as their deputy Aya (governess) in 1861. On 1 August 1867, the queen gave her the title Marchioness of Los Remedios. In 1877, her former charge king Alfonso XII appointed her deputy governess for i younger sisters infanta Pilar, Eulalia and Paz.
