= C. Leon Broutin =

Claude Léon Broutin (Spanish: Claudio León Broutin; 1859–1926) was a French fencing master who emigrated to Spain and became well known as the author of a treatise on fencing.

== Biography ==
He was born Emmanuel Claude Joseph Broutin in Metz in 1859. He was the son of Emmanuel Broutin (1826–1883), a fencing master, and Marie-Louise Pasquier, a dressmaker. Achille Broutin (1860–1918), one of his brothers, was a collector of weapons and also a fencing master.

He left France with his family at the end of 1863, following a duel between his father Emmanuel and a person close to the Emperor Napoleon III. A pupil of his father (himself a pupil of the famous Jean-Louis Michel), Broutin succeeded in opening his own fencing school in Madrid and wrote a treaty of fencing El Arte de la Esgrima, with a preface written by the marqués de Altavilla, published in 1893. He was fencing master of the Spanish Army's staff, of the Royal Academy of Fine Arts of San Fernando's circle, and a corresponding member of the Académie d'Armes de Paris.

After fall of the Second French Empire he came back every winter to Paris with his family and could participate in fencing tournaments. Married to Luciana Santurde y Arraiz (1855–?), he died without descent in Madrid in 1926.

== Publications ==
- C. León Broutin, El Arte de la Esgrima – precedida de un carta prólogo por el marqués de Alta Villa; ilustraciones de Picolo. Printed by Ricardo Fé, Madrid, 1893
- Szwiec, Nathalie "Un Duel sous le Second Empire" in Bulletin n°18 de l'Académie du Second Empire – pp. 103–104 – 2010
