= The Scandal (novel) =

1875 novel by Pedro Antonio de Alarcón

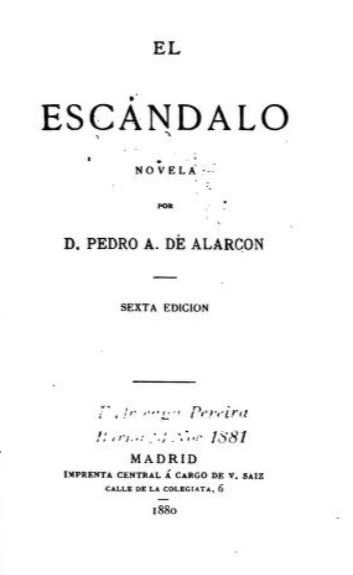
- Title page for El escándalo (1880 edition)
- Author: Pedro Antonio de Alarcón
- Original title: El escándalo
- Language: Spanish
- Publication date: 1875
- Publication place: Spain

The Scandal (Spanish: El escándalo) is an 1875 novel by the Spanish writer Pedro Antonio de Alarcón.

== Plot ==
Set in Madrid in 1861, the novel is about a wealthy libertine, Fabián Conde, who reveals the intrigues and mishaps of his bourgeois life during a confession with a Jesuit priest.

== Reception ==
At its publication, the novel upset some Spanish liberals, with whom Alarcón previously had been involved, for its perceived pro-Jesuit theme and conservative, anti-bourgeois politics. It received negative reviews from Emilia Pardo Bazán, Leopoldo Alas, Manuel de la Revilla and Armando Palacio Valdés. In his 1881 book Historia de mis libros, Alarcón responded to this reception and argued it was unjustified and based on overly political interpretations of dramaturgical considerations.

== Adaptations ==
The Scandal was the basis for the 1934 Mexican film The Scandal directed by Chano Urueta, and the 1943 Spanish film The Scandal directed by José Luis Sáenz de Heredia.
