= Francisco Ortego =

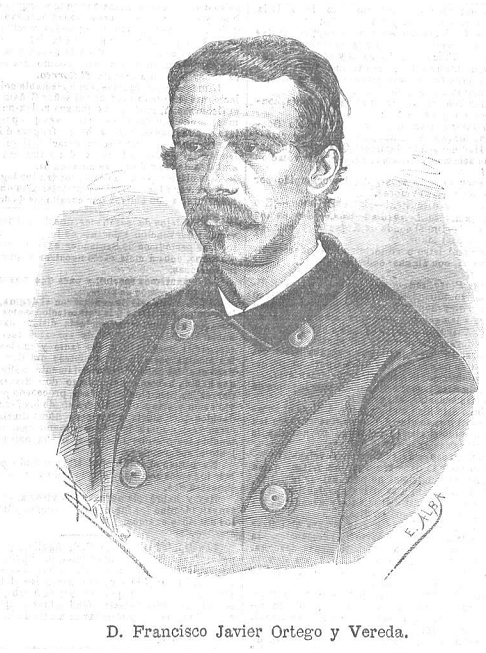
- Born: 1833; Madrid, Spain
- Died: 1881 (aged 47–48); Bois-Colombes, France
- Occupation: Illustrator

Francisco Ortego y Vereda (1833–1881) was a Spanish caricaturist and illustrator. He was born in Madrid in 1833 and died in Bois-Colombes, France, in 1881.

== Education and career ==
He studied at the School of Fine Arts of San Fernando in Madrid and later lived a long time in Barcelona. He illustrated numerous novels and made lithographs. He collaborated on publications such as El Pájaro Rojo (The Red Bird), El Garbanzo (The Chickpea), Fray Verás (You will see the Friar), El Cascabel (The Rattlesnake), Don Diego de Noche (Don Diego of the Night), El Bazar (The Bazaar) and especially Gil Blas (1864). He also edited El Fisgón (The Voyeur) (1865), Doña Manuela (1865), El Sainete (The Farce) (1867) and Jeremías (Jeremiah) (1869), cultivating a caricature-like and scathing style. In 1867, he published in El Museo Universal, popular aspects of Ávila, represented by artesans and the countryside, from the etchings of José Severini. He also illustrated works of literature, like that of Pedro Antonio de Alarcón, Diary of a Witness (Diario de un testigo de la guerra de África) in 1860, or Don Juan Tenorio in 1860 by Manuel Fernandez y Gonzalez. He was responsible for preparing the posters for the Spanish company Chocolates Matías López.

As a painter, his best known work was Muerte de Cristóbal Colón (Death of Christopher Columbus), a history painting which won special honors in the National Fine Arts Exhibition of 1864. Generally, his paintings were small in size and easy compositions based on a theme of popular imagery.

== Death ==
Underpaid as an artist and with a large family, Ortego's economic situation was difficult. Attached to his republican and liberal political views, he hesitantly relocated, in 1871 to France in order to improve his prospects, remaining there until the end of his life. His work was published in various satirical newspapers in Paris.

At the time of his death, the Editorial Gaspar Roig prepared an edition which was published in Madrid titled Album Ortego, with a collection of his drawings, with an introduction by Josep Lluís Pellicer, in order to financially assist the widow and children.

He was a humorous and skilled chronicler of the personages of his time, and the author of several distinguished political satires.
