= Salle Jean Louis =

Salle d'armes Jean-Louis - Académie d'escrime
- Abbreviation: SJL
- Formation: 1955 (Auckland NZ) 1900 (Paris France)
- Purpose: Non Profit Fencing Club
- Location: Auckland, New Zealand
- Members: Fencing North, Fencing New Zealand
- Website: https://sjl.org.nz

The 'Salle Jean Louis' Fencing Club is one of New Zealand's oldest Fencing clubs and is located on the North Shore of Auckland New Zealand. Founded in 1955, the Club has been home to a number of elite fencers and has won multiple national championships.

== History ==
This New Zealand club was founded by Bert Raper in 1955 in Auckland city and was originally based in Pitt street in Auckland. The club then moved to the North Shore in the 1970s using high school gyms. The club has been operating out of Rangitoto College since around 2004. Salle Jean Louis can directly trace itself back to one of the great fencing masters Jean-Louis Michel himself, through his Prevost, one Emmanuel Broutin who ran the club Salle D'Armes Jean Louis in Paris around the turn of the 19th century. The line then passed to his son C. Leon Broutin, to two English fencers (John and Victor Millard), to Bert Raper. Salle Jean Louis was founded in Auckland by Bert Raper in 1955. He in turn instructed Brian Pickworth and Dot Guard. The club moved to the North Shore of Auckland in the 70s and was run by Les Penny for numerous years until his passing. From there it has stayed on the North Shore situated at first Glenfield college, then Westlake Girls. Around this time the club changed its name to Salle d'armes Jean-Louis - Académie d'escrime and for the last 20 years has been located at Rangitoto College, and recently running sessions from Northcote College. SJL was at its hey day in the 60s New Zealand's elite fencing club, with an ex National selector remarking that he could make the National team but was unqualified to make the club team.

== Current Club ==
Salle Jean Louis currently fences at North Shore Brass Band Hall on the North Shore of Auckland, New Zealand on Tuesday nights from 7:00-9:00 pm. The club is non-profit and takes anyone of an age greater than 13 years.

== Professional Affiliations ==
Salle Jean Louis (SJL) is fully affiliated to the Regional Province (Fencing North), the National body (FENZ), which is in turn affiliated to the International body Fédération Internationale d'Escrime . (FIE)
