= The Three-Cornered Hat (album) =

- Philips CD: 411 046-2

Studio album by André Previn
- Released: 1983
- Genre: Classical ballet
- Length: 42:55
- Language: Spanish
- Label: Philips Classics

Le Tricorne, Danse du Feu
- Philips French LP: 6514 281

The Three-Cornered Hat is a 42-minute classical studio album in which the Pittsburgh Symphony Orchestra under André Previn perform the whole of Manuel de Falla's ballet The Three-Cornered Hat and, as a filler, the Ritual Fire Dance from his ballet Love the Magician. The longer work's two brief vocal passages are sung by the American mezzo-soprano Frederica von Stade. The album was released in 1983.

== Recording ==
The booklet accompanying the CD release of the album does not name its producer or engineer or reveal where it was taped, but does state that it was recorded digitally.

== Cover art ==
Apart from minor differences in lettering, the covers of the American and British LP, cassette and CD versions of the album are all the same, and were designed and illustrated by Chris Verschoor.

== Critical reception ==
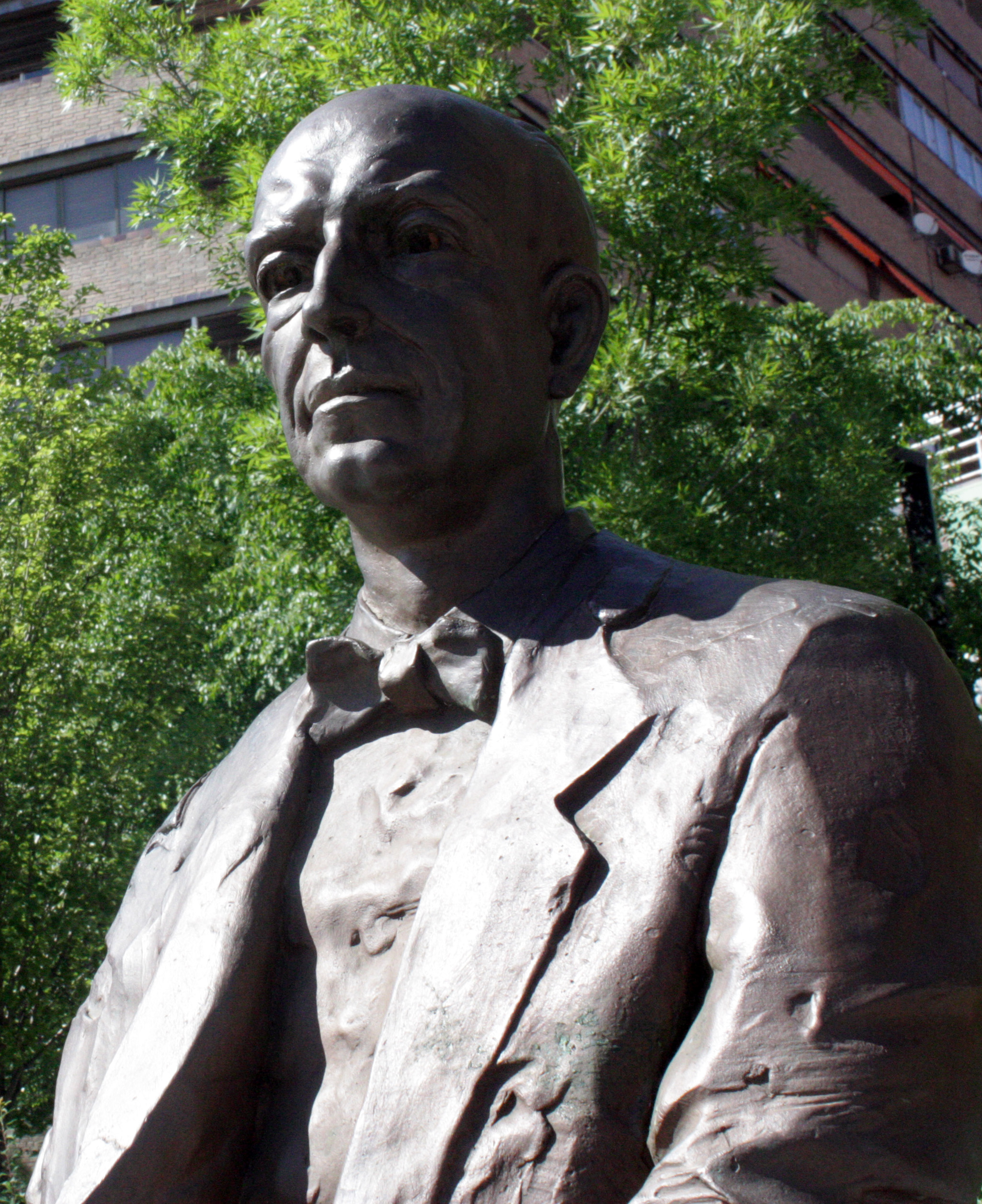
A statue of Manuel de Falla in Avenida de la Constitución, Granada, Spain

Edward Greenfield reviewed the album on LP in Gramophone in April 1983, comparing it with previous recordings of The Three-Cornered Hat conducted by Ernest Ansermet, Rafael Frühbeck de Burgos and Eduardo Mata. Ansermet and Frühbeck de Burgos, he thought, had conveyed the music's "earthier qualities" better than Previn, and Frühbeck de Burgos was "more idiomatically Spanish". The chief virtue of Previn's album was that it was more successful than its predecessors in bringing out "a chamber-like quality in the detail and precision of the orchestral writing". The lucidity of Previn's performance reminded Greenfield of "Stravinsky and Ravel ballets on the one hand [and] neo-classic models on the other". "The ear is ravished by the texture", he wrote. The other salient feature of Previn's reading was his "characteristic emphasis on rhythmic qualities". Greenfield was ambivalent about the brief vocal passage at the beginning of the work. Frederica von Stade's voice was "lovely", he thought, but it was so prominent in the mix that she seemed to be introducing the ballet as if standing in a spotlight at the front of the stage. On the comparison discs, the soprano soloists sounded further away, providing "instant evocation of Spanish atmosphere". In every other respect the album's engineering was exemplary, and certain to delight audiophiles. "A modern digital recording, even by Philips standards unusually refined and beautifully balanced, brings out beauties in Falla's scoring in this, his masterpiece, that one might not expect".

Costume designs for the ballet's première in 1919, created by Picasso for Diaghilev's Ballets Russes

Greenfield revisited the album in Gramophone in August 1984 to assess how it sounded after being remastered for CD. On this occasion, he compared it with a new Decca release of The Three-Cornered Hat performed by Huguette Tourangeau and the Montreal Symphony Orchestra under the direction of Charles Dutoit. Once again he relished the way in which "Previn's crisp and rhythmic account of the Falla ballet [brought out its] Stravinskian associations", but he felt that the sound of the newer recording was preferable to the "closeness and dryness" of the old. "Outstandingly warm and evocative", Dutoit's disc had "far more space round the instruments" than Previn's, yet was no less revealing of inner detail. Philips's forward balancing of von Stade seemed as unfortunate an error of judgment as ever - Tourangeau, like the singers on Ansermet's, Frühbeck de Burgos's and Mata's recordings, had been recorded as if from a distance, and was "far more effective" as a result. It was clear that, all in all, Dutoit's CD was the better of the two.

The album was included in BBC Radio 3's Release on 4 June 1983, and was also reviewed in The complete Penguin stereo record and cassette guide, The Penguin guide to compact discs, cassettes and LPs, Dance and Dancers, Fanfare and High Fidelity (where von Stade's contribution was judged disappointingly "bland").

== CD track listing ==
Manuel de Falla (1876-1946)

El sombrero de tres picos (The Three-Cornered Hat) (1919)

- 1 (1:15) Introducción (Introduction)

Part One

- 2 (5:39) La tarde (Afternoon)
- 3 (2:27) Danza de la molinera (Fandango) (Dance of the miller's wife)
- 4 (0:20) El corregidor (The magistrate)
- 5 (0:46) La molinera (The miller's wife)
- 6 (4:03) Las uvas (The grapes)

Part Two

- 7 (3:08) Danza de los vecinos (Seguidillas) (Dance of the neighbours)
- 8 (7:57) Danza del molinero (Farucca) (The miller's dance)
- 9 (6:59) Danza del corregidor (The magistrate's dance)
- 10 (6:38) Danza finale (Jota) (Final dance)

El Amor Brujo (Love the Magician) (1915)

- 11 (3:44) Danza ritual del fuego (Ritual fire dance)

== Personnel ==
- Frederica von Stade, mezzo-soprano
- Pittsburgh Symphony Orchestra
- André Previn (1929–2019), conductor

== Release history ==
In 1983, Philips released the album on LP (catalogue number 6514 281) and on cassette (catalogue number 7337 281).

In 1984, Philips issued the album on CD (catalogue number 411 046-2) with a 12-page insert booklet lacking texts or translations but providing notes by Gerald Norris in English, French and German.
