= Isabella II =

Queen of Spain from 1833 to 1868

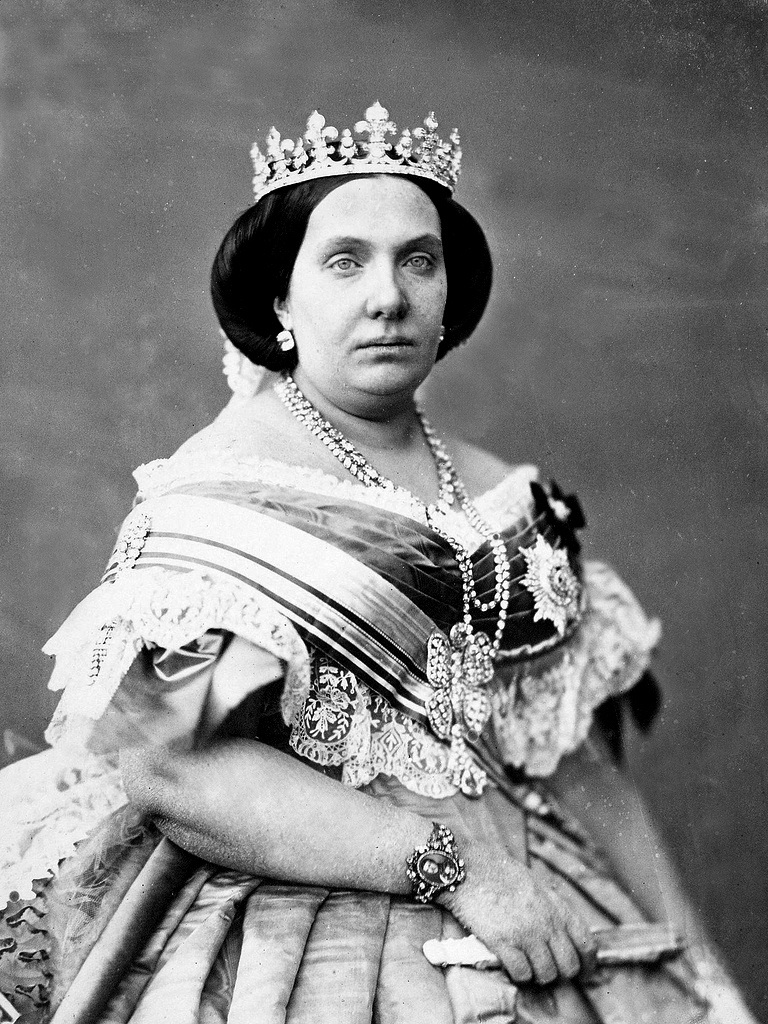
- Formal portrait, c. 1860

Queen of Spain
- Reign: 29 September 1833 – 30 September 1868
- Enthronement: 10 November 1843
- Predecessor: Ferdinand VII
- Successor: Amadeo I (1870)
- Prime ministers: Full list
- Regents: Queen María Cristina (1833–1840); Baldomero Espartero (1840–1843)
- Born: 10 October 1830; Royal Palace of Madrid, Madrid, Spain
- Died: 9 April 1904 (aged 73); Palacio Castilla, Paris, France
- Burial: El Escorial
- Spouse: Francisco de Asís, Duke of Cádiz (m. 1846; died 1902)
- Issue Among others...: Isabel, Princess of Asturias; Alfonso XII; Infanta María del Pilar; Infanta María de la Paz; Infanta María Eulalia, Duchess of Galliera
Names
- María Isabel Luisa de Borbón y Borbón-Dos Sicilias
- House: Bourbon
- Father: Ferdinand VII
- Mother: Maria Christina of the Two Sicilies

Isabella II (Spanish: Isabel II, María Isabel Luisa de Borbón y Borbón-Dos Sicilias; 10 October 1830 – 9 April 1904) was Queen of Spain from 1833 until her deposition in 1868. She is the only queen regnant in the history of unified Spain. (Note: She was formally Queen of Spain, unlike Isabella I, who was proclaimed Queen of Castile, although the latter is nevertheless sometimes considered to have also been Queen of Spain.)

Isabella was the elder daughter of King Ferdinand VII and Queen Maria Christina. Shortly before Isabella's birth, her father issued the Pragmatic Sanction to revert the Salic Law and ensure the succession of his firstborn daughter, due to his lack of a son. She came to the throne a month before her third birthday, but her succession was disputed by her uncle, Infante Carlos (founder of the Carlist movement), whose refusal to recognize a female sovereign led to the Carlist Wars. Under the regency of her mother, Spain transitioned from an absolute monarchy to a constitutional monarchy, adopting the Royal Statute of 1834 and Constitution of 1837.

In 1843, Isabella was declared of age and began her personal rule. Her reign was a period marked by palace intrigues, back-stairs and antechamber influences, barracks conspiracies, and military pronunciamientos. Her marriage to Francisco de Asís, Duke of Cádiz was an unhappy one, and her personal conduct as well as recurrent rumours of extramarital affairs damaged her reputation. In September 1868, a naval mutiny began in Cádiz, marking the beginning of the Glorious Revolution. The defeat of her forces by Marshal Francisco Serrano, 1st Duke of la Torre, brought her reign to an end, and she went into exile in France. In 1870, she formally abdicated the Spanish throne in favour of her son, Alfonso. In 1874, the First Spanish Republic was overthrown in a coup. The Bourbon monarchy was restored, and Alfonso ascended the throne as King Alfonso XII. Isabella returned to Spain two years later but soon again left for France, where she resided until her death in 1904.

== Birth and regencies ==
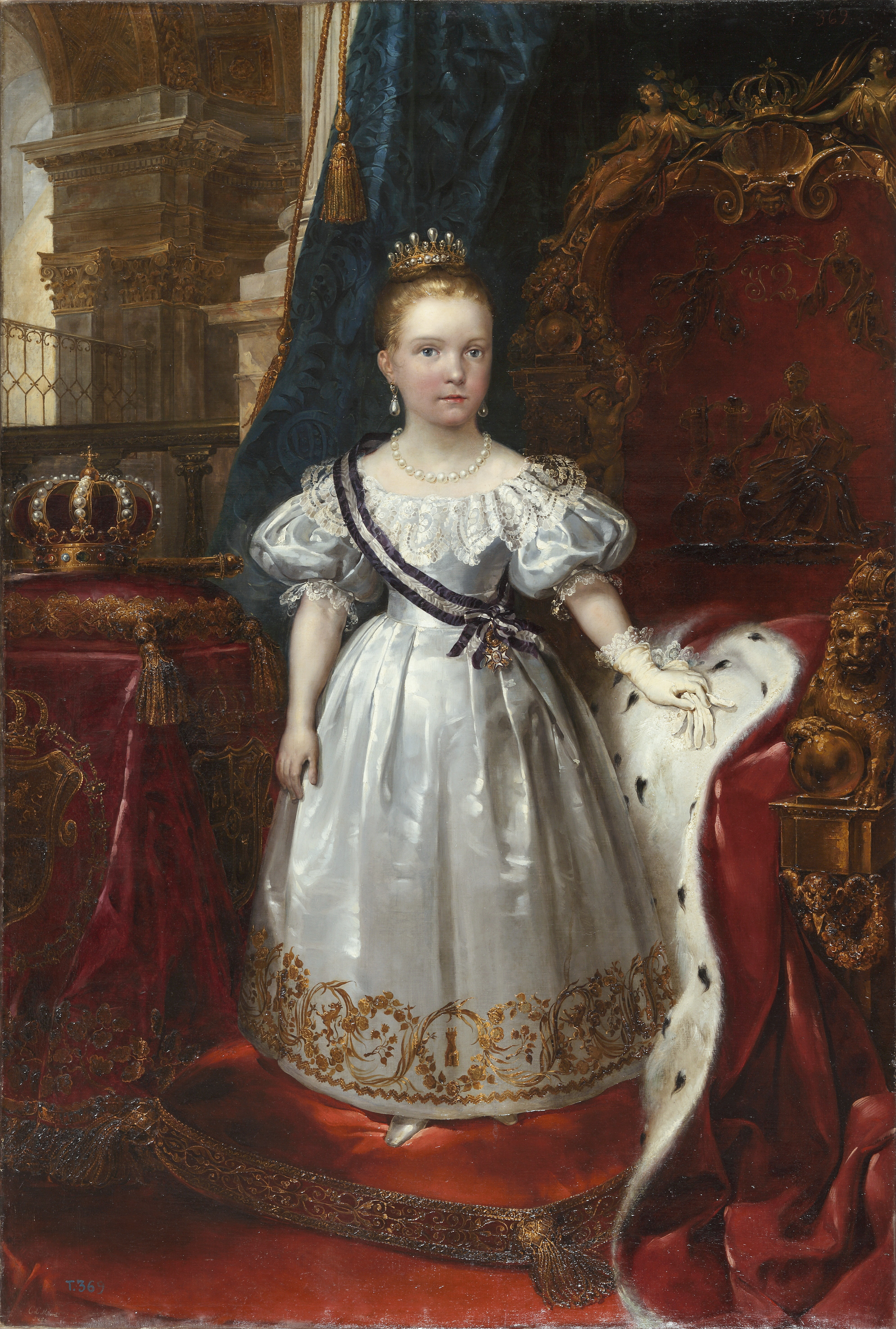
Isabella II as a child. She is depicted wearing the sash of the Order of Queen Maria Luisa.

Isabella was born in the Royal Palace of Madrid in 1830, the eldest daughter of King Ferdinand VII of Spain, and of his fourth wife and niece, Maria Christina of the Two Sicilies. She was entrusted to the royal governess María del Carmen Machín y Ortiz de Zárate. Queen Maria Christina became regent on 29 September 1833, and Isabella, at just two years old, was proclaimed sovereign following the death of Ferdinand VII.

Isabella succeeded to the throne because Ferdinand VII had induced the Cortes Generales to help him set aside the Salic law, introduced by the Bourbons in the early 18th century, and to reestablish the older succession law of Spain. The first pretender to the throne, Ferdinand's brother Infante Carlos, Count of Molina, fought for seven years during Isabella's minority to dispute her title (see First Carlist War). The supporters of Carlos and his descendants were known as Carlists, and the fight over the succession was the subject of a number of Carlist Wars in the 19th century.

Isabella's reign was maintained only through the support of the army. The Cortes and the Moderate Liberals and Progressives reestablished constitutional and parliamentary government, dissolved the religious orders and confiscated their property (including that of the Jesuits), and tried to restore order to Spain's finances. After the Carlist war, the regent, Maria Christina, resigned to make way for Baldomero Espartero, Prince of Vergara, the most successful and most popular Isabelline general. Espartero, a Progressive, remained regent for only two years.

Her minority saw tensions with the United States over the Amistad affair.

Baldomero Espartero was deposed in 1843 by a military and political pronunciamiento led by Generals Leopoldo O'Donnell and Ramón María Narváez. They formed a cabinet, presided over by Joaquín María López y López. This government induced the Cortes to declare Isabella of age at 13. Between the beginning of her reign in 1833, and the abdication of Margrethe II of Denmark in 2024, at any given time, there was a queen regnant in Europe. (Note: The other queens regnant in Europe during the period between 1833 and 2024 were: Victoria (1837–1901) and Elizabeth II of the United Kingdom (1952–2022); Wilhelmina (1890–1948), Juliana (1948–1980) and Beatrix of the Netherlands (1980–2013) Maria II of Portugal (1834–1853); and the aforementioned Margethe II of Denmark, who reigned from 1972 to 2024. Additionally, Marie-Adélaïde (1912–1919) and Charlotte of Luxembourg (1919–1964) also became sovereigns during that time frame, although they reigned as grand duchesses rather than queens regnant.)

== Reign as an adult ==
=== Beginnings ===
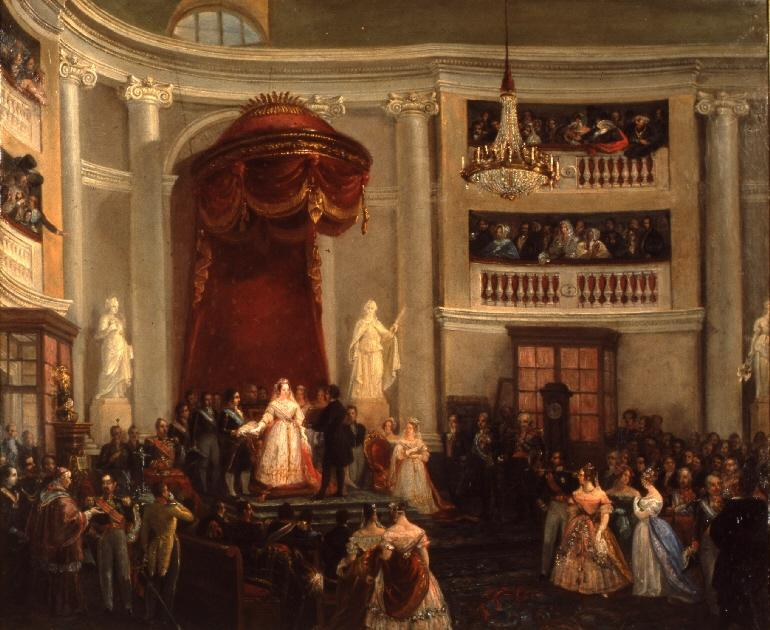
Isabella swears the Constitution, by José Castelaro.

Isabella was declared of age and swore the 1837 Constitution on 10 November 1843, age thirteen. Despite the alleged parliamentary supremacy, in practice, the "double trust" led to Isabella having a role in the making and toppling of governments, undermining the progressives. The uneasy alliance between moderates and progressives that had toppled Espartero in July 1843 was already disintegrating by the time of the coming of age of the queen. Following a brief government led by progressive Salustiano de Olózaga, the moderates elected their candidate, Pedro José Pidal, to the presidency of the Cortes. After the subsequent decision to dissolve the hostile Cortes by Olózaga on 28 November, rumours about an alleged forcing of the queen to sign the royal decree spread. As a result, Olózaga was prosecuted, removed from political office, and forced to exile, with the Progressive Party already being beheaded, in what was the starting point of their growing disaffection from the Isabelline monarchy.

=== Moderate decade ===
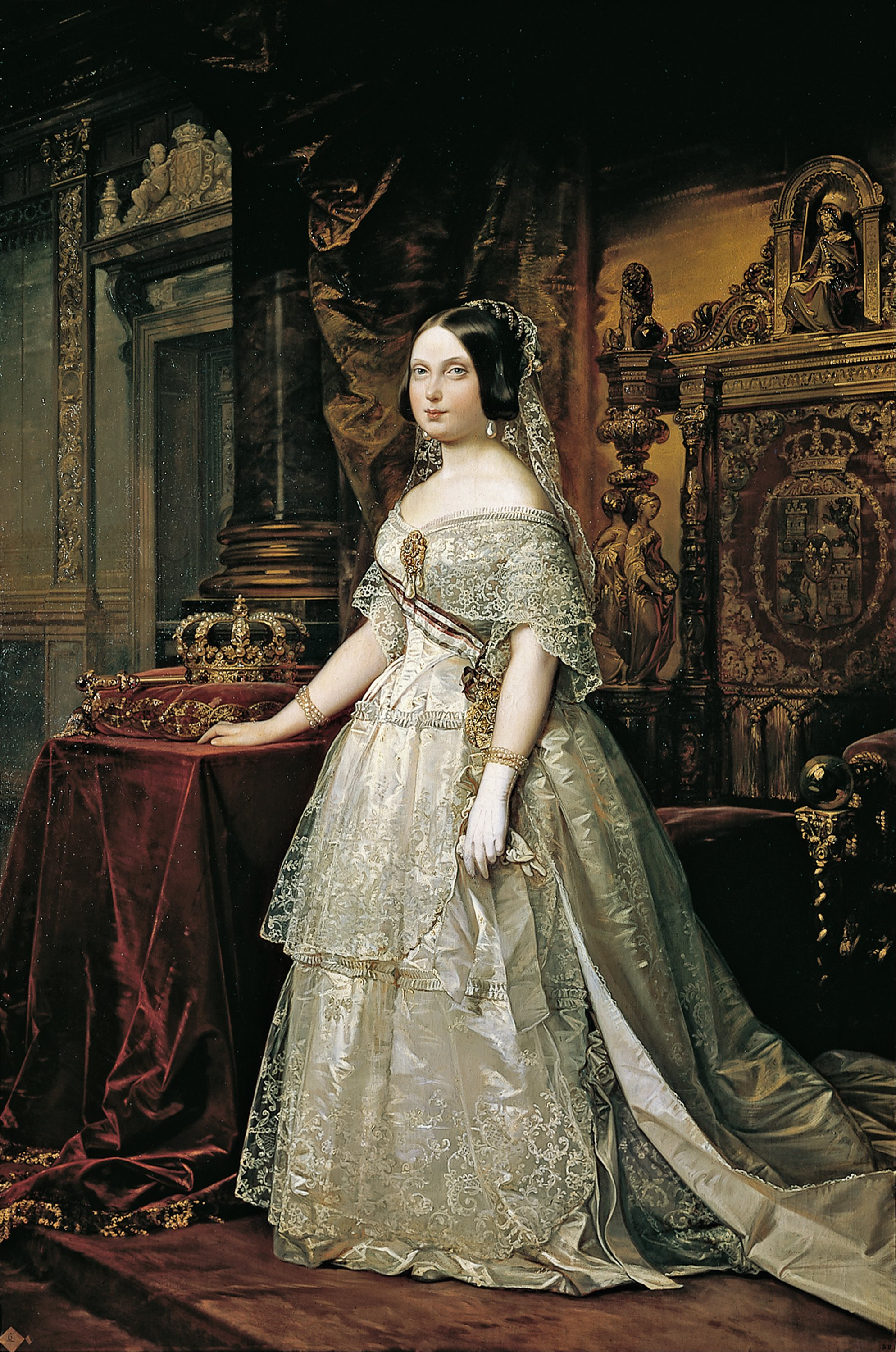
Portrait painting of Isabella II by Federico de Madrazo y Kuntz (1844).

Dominated by the figure of Marshal Narváez, the Espadón ("Big Sword") of Loja, the so-called "Moderate decade" began in 1844. The constitutional reforms devised by Narváez moved away from the 1837 Constitution by rejecting national sovereignty and reinforcing the power of the monarch, to the point of a "co-sovereignty" between the Cortes and the Queen.

On 10 October 1846, the Moderate Party made their sixteen-year-old queen marry her double-first cousin Francisco de Asís, Duke of Cádiz (1822–1902), the same day that her younger sister, Infanta Luisa Fernanda, married Antoine d'Orléans, Duke of Montpensier. (Note: Isabella and Francisco de Asís were rather caustically described by 1866 by an English contemporary thus: … The Queen is large in stature, but rather what might be called bulky than stately. There is no dignity either in her face or figure, and the graces of majesty are altogether wanting. The countenance is cold and expressionless, with traces of an unchastened, unrefined, and impulsive character, and the indifference it betrays is not redeemed by any regularity or beauty of feature. The King Consort is much smaller in figure than his royal two-thirds, and certainly is not a type that could be admired for its manly qualifications; but we have to remember that in Spain aristocratic birth is designated rather by a diminutive stature and sickly complexion than by those attributes of height, muscular power, open expression, and florid hue, which in England constitute the ideal of ‘race.’) Disgusted by her marriage, Isabella reportedly commented later to one of her intimates: "what shall I tell you about a man whom I saw wearing more lace than I was wearing on our wedding night?"

The marriages suited France and Louis Philippe I, King of the French, who as a result bitterly quarrelled with Britain. However, the marriages were not happy; persistent rumour had it that few if any of Isabella's children were fathered by her King Consort, rumoured to be a homosexual. The Carlist party asserted that the heir-apparent to the throne, who later became Alfonso XII, had been fathered by a captain of the guard, Enrique Puigmoltó y Mayans.

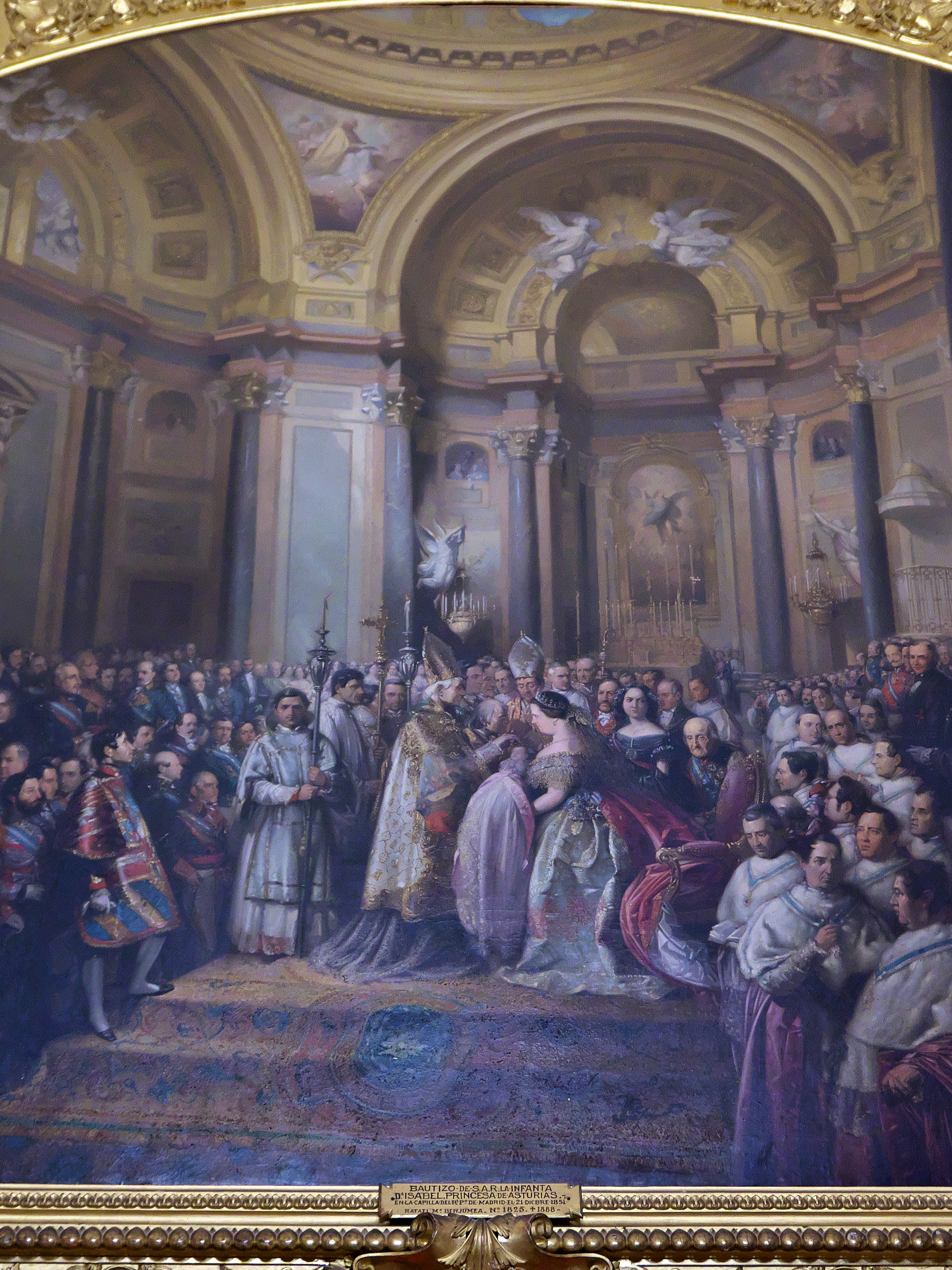
Baptism of the Princess of Asturias in December 1851, by Rafael Benjumea

In 1847, a major scandal took place when Isabella, age seventeen, publicly showed her love for General Serrano and her willingness to divorce from her husband Francisco de Asís; though Narváez and Isabella's mother Maria Christina solved the problem posed to the monarchical institution—Serrano was shifted away from the capital to the post of Captain General of Granada in 1848—, the deterioration of the public image of the queen increased from then on. Following the near-revolution of 1848, Narváez was authorised to rule as dictator to repress insurrectionary attempts up until 1849.

In late 1851, Isabella II gave birth to her first daughter and heir presumptive, who was baptised on 21 December as María Isabel Francisca de Asís. Historians have attributed the Princess of Asturias' biological parenthood to José Ruiz de Arana, Gentilhombre de cámara.

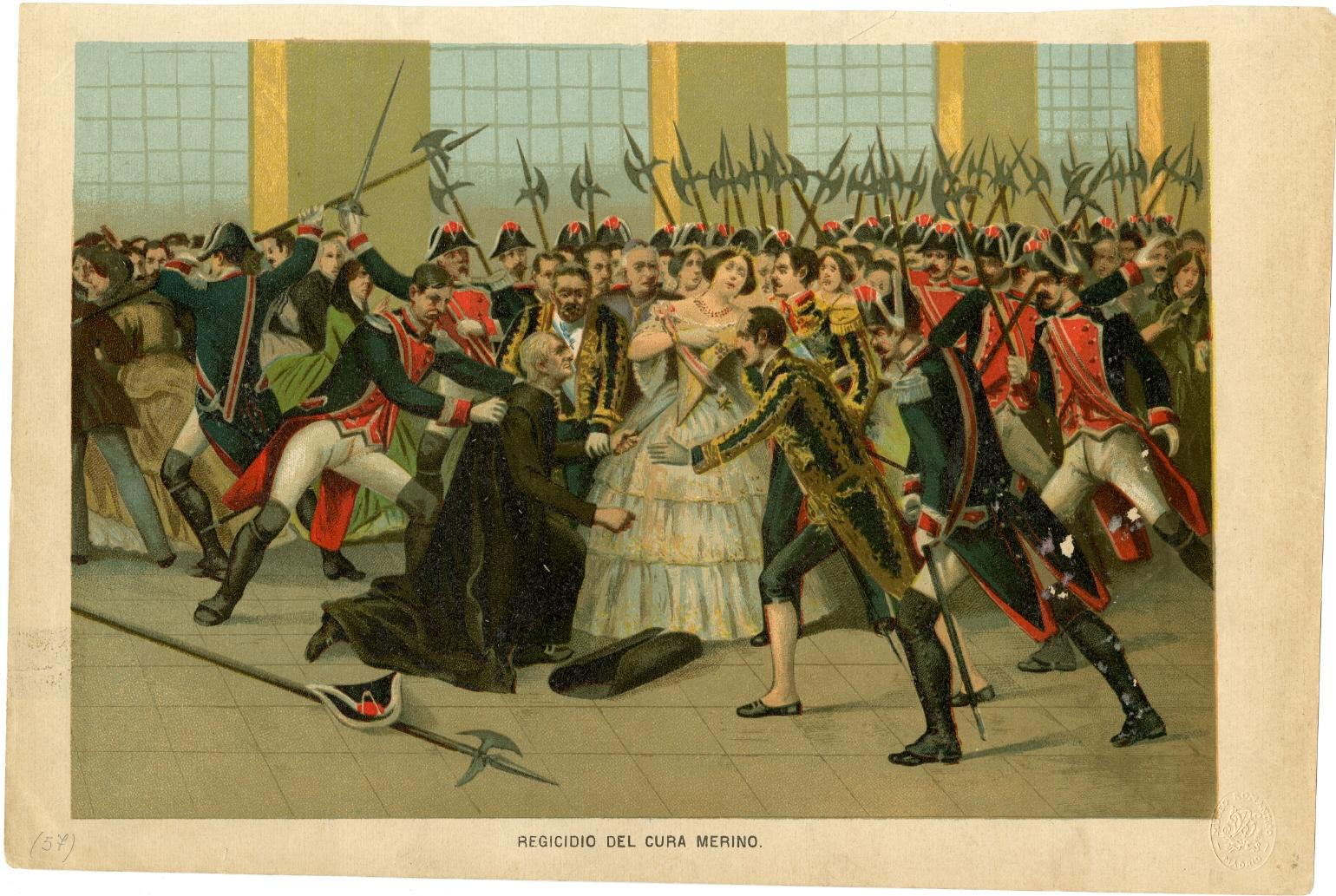
Attempted regicide by cura Martín Merino y Gómez, 1852

On 2 February 1852, Isabella and the Royal Guard were caught by surprise while the Queen was leaving the Chapel of the Royal Palace intending to go with her parade to the Basilica of Nuestra Señora de Atocha: Martín Merino y Gómez, an ordained priest and liberal activist approached the queen giving the impression of wanting to deliver her a message, and stabbed her. The impact was reduced by the gold embroidery of her dress and by the baleen stays of her corset, and what was intended to be a stab wound to the chest only resulted in a minor incision at the right side of the belly. Merino, quickly seized by the halberdiers of the Royal Guard (with help from the dukes of Osuna and Tamames, the Marquis of Alcañices and the Count of Pinohermoso), was defrocked and executed by garrote.

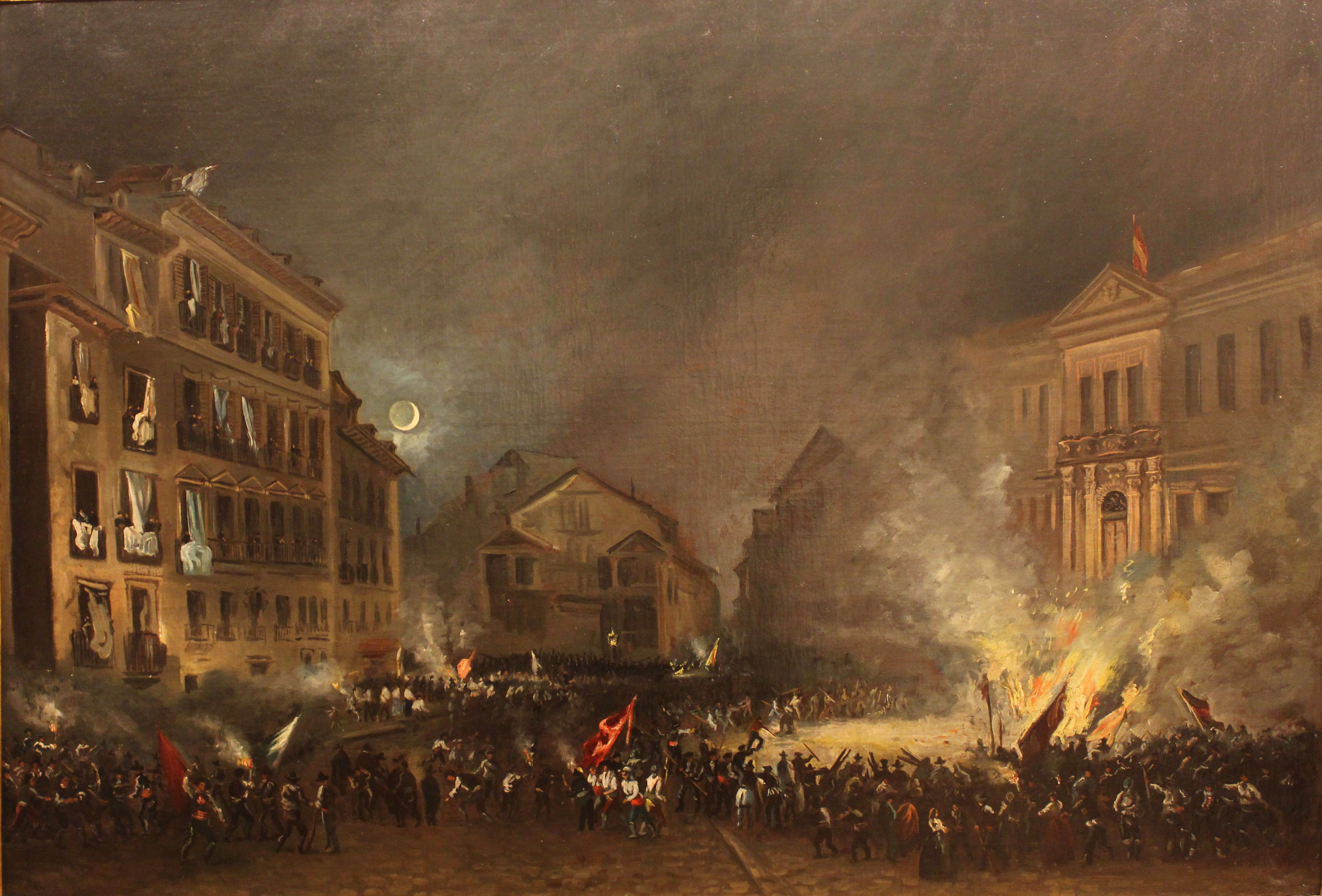
July 1854 revolution in Madrid

Under the government of the Count of San Luis (whose ascension to premiership had been solely founded on the support from the networks of the royal court), the system was in a critical state by June 1854. On 28 June 1854 a military pronunciamiento intending to force the queen to oust the government of the Count of San Luis, featuring Leopoldo O'Donnell (a "puritan" moderate), took place in Vicálvaro, the so-called Vicalvarada. The military coup (rather dominated by the moderates themselves) had a mixed result and O'Donnell (advised by Ángel Fernández de los Ríos and Antonio Cánovas del Castillo) proceeded then to seek for civilian support, promising new reforms not in the initial plans in order to appeal to progressives, by bringing a "liberal regeneration", as proclaimed in the Manifesto of Manzanares, drafted by Antonio Cánovas del Castillo and issued on 7 July 1854.

Days later, the situation was followed by a full-scale people's revolution, with revolutionary juntas organised on 17 July in Madrid, and barricades erected in the streets. With the prospect of a civil war on the horizon, Isabella was advised to appoint General Espartero (who enjoyed charisma and popular support) as prime minister. This renewed ascension of Espartero marked the beginning of the bienio progresista.

=== Progressive biennium ===
Espartero entered the capital of Spain on 28 July, and proceeded to separate again Isabella from the influence of María Christina. In any case, though Isabella accepted advice from María Christina, she was not characterised for displaying a profound filial love towards her mother.

By virtue of a royal decree, the port of Iloílo in then-Spanish Philippines was opened to world trade on 29 September 1855, mainly to export sugar and other products to America, Australia and Europe.

A Liberal Constitution ("the Unborn One") was drafted in 1856, yet it was never enacted as the counter-revolutionary coup by O'Donnell seized power.

=== Later reign ===
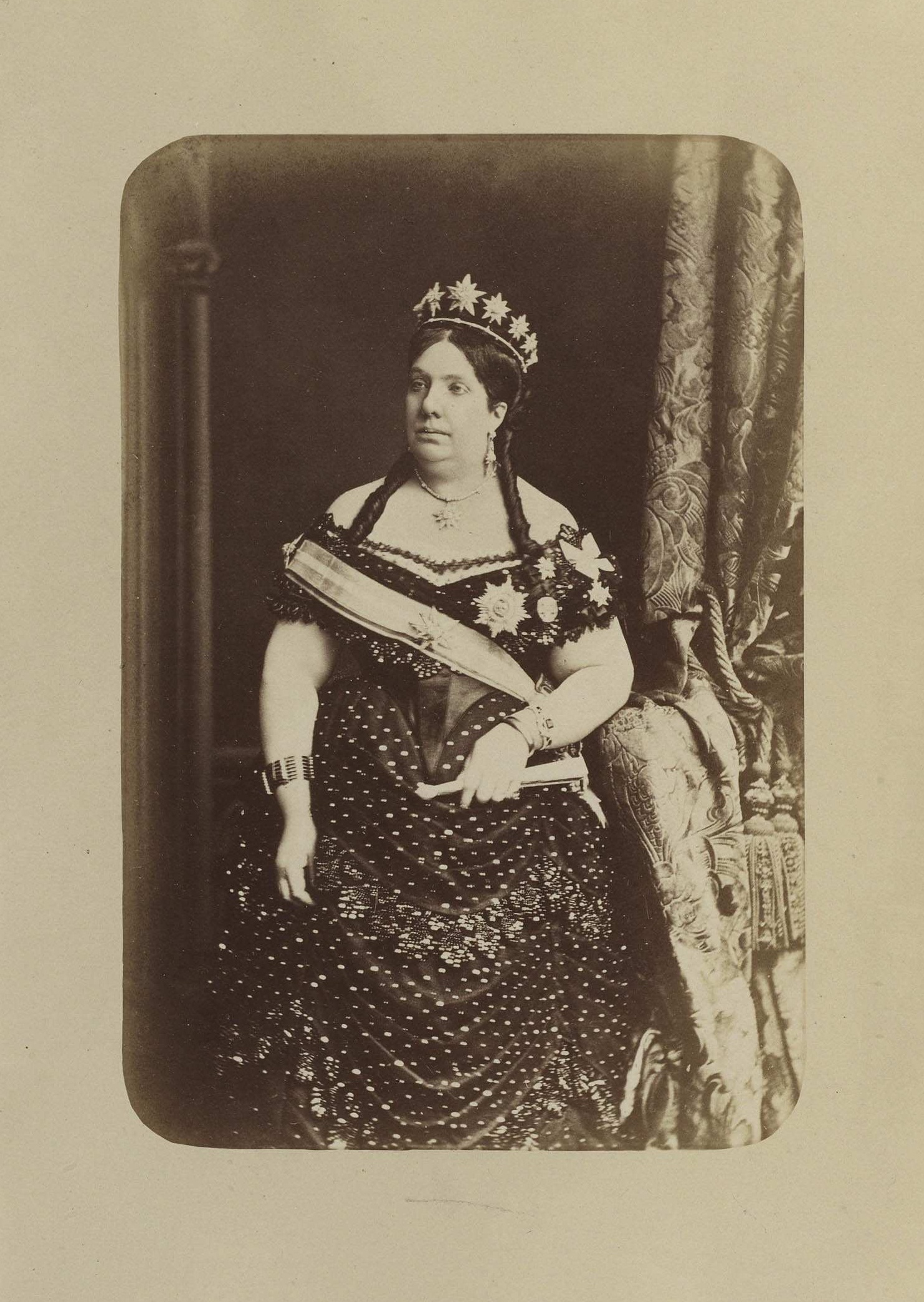
Isabella circa 1868

On 28 November 1857, Isabella II gave birth to a male heir, who was baptised on 7 December 1857 as Alfonso Francisco de Asís Fernando Pío Juan María Gregorio y Pelagio. Assumed by historians to be the biological son of Enrique Puigmoltó y Mayans, the toddler, who replaced infanta Isabella as Prince of Asturias upon his birth, was known under the moniker el Puigmoltejo, in reference to the rumours about his presumed biological parenthood. Isabella II showed a special affection for the child, greater than that shown to her daughters.

The later part of her reign saw a war against Morocco (1859–1860), which ended in a treaty advantageous for Spain and cession of some Moroccan territory, the Spanish retaking of Santo Domingo (1861–1865), and the fruitless Chincha Islands War (1865–1866) against Bolivia, Chile, Ecuador, and Peru.

==== Revolution and coup ====
In August 1866, exiled forces comprising both elements from the Democratic and the Progressive Party met secretly in Belgium and subscribed to the Pact of Ostend under the initiative of Marshal Prim, seeking to topple Isabella. On 7 July 1868, Isabella banished her sister and brother-in-law from Spain, as they were linked to a conspiracy against the Crown in connivance with generals from the Liberal Union.

Since the late summer, Isabella II had been enjoying her traditional holiday on the coast at Lekeitio, Biscay. The royal entourage moved to San Sebastián to hold a meeting with Napoleon III and Eugenia de Montijo, scheduled for 18 September, but it did not take place, as the French royals did not arrive in time and it was subsequently aborted.

On that day, a pronunciamento took place in Cádiz. Led by Marshal Prim and the Admiral Topete (himself an unconditional follower of the Duke of Montpensier), it marked the beginning of the Glorious Revolution. The Democratic Party provided the insurrection with popular support, making it transcend the nature of a simple military statement into an actual revolution.

Factors for the revolution included the weariness of the moderates alienated by the Crown and the progressives barely having even the chance to rule. Both developed a vis-à-vis with the Isabelline monarchy. Other factors were the personal behaviour of the queen, the corruption, the abortion of the possibility of political reform and the economic crisis alienating the bourgeoisie. Historians looking at social roots for the revolution highlight that peasantry, small bourgeoisie, and the proletariat formed an alternative to bourgeoisie proper, articulated through the progressive and federal republican forces.

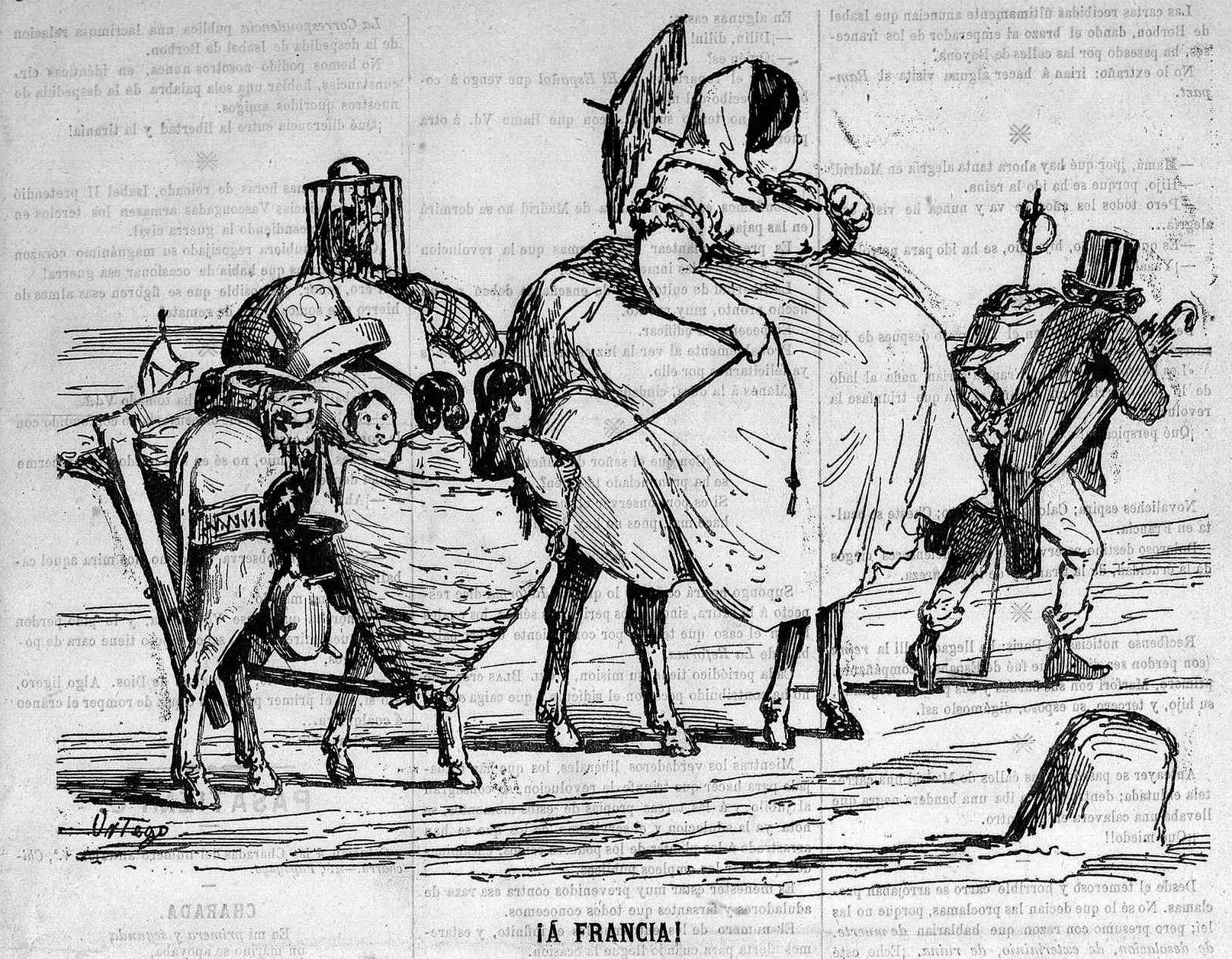
To France!, a caricature by Francisco Ortego depicting the exile of Isabella published in Gil Blas on 4 October 1868

By September 1868 Isabella was a repudiated monarch, and, during the early stages of the revolution, instances of political iconoclasm carried out by the masses took place, leading to the destruction of many symbols and emblems of the Bourbon dynasty, a Damnatio memoriae.

The defeat of the Isabelline forces commanded by Manuel Pavía y Lacy by the revolutionary forces led by Marshal Serrano at the 28 September 1868 Battle of Alcolea led to the definitive demise of Isabella II's 35-year reign. In the light of the news, Isabella and her entourage left San Sebastián and went to exile taking a train to Biarritz (France) on 30 September. As Isabella entered France after her abdication, her train passed a group of homecoming exiles who taunted her with cries of "Down with the Bourbons!", "Long Live Liberty!" and "Long Live the Republic!".

Prim—leader of the liberal progressives—was received in a festive mood by the Madrilenian people at his arrival in the capital in early October. He pronounced his famous speech of the "three nevers" directed against the Bourbons. At the Puerta del Sol, he gave a highly symbolic hug to Serrano, the leader of the revolutionary forces triumphant in the bridge of Alcolea.

== Life after ousting ==
Following the crossing of the French–Spanish border by train on 30 September, the Queen and King spent 5 weeks in the Château de Pau organising their Parisian future. They went to the French capital and arrived on 8 November, settling in the Rue de Rivoli 172. Isabella was forced to renounce her dynastic rights in Paris in favour of her son Alfonso on 25 June 1870, officially "freely and spontaneously". Involving an economic settling, the formal separation between Isabella and Francisco had pended on the passing of the former queen's dynastic rights to her son.

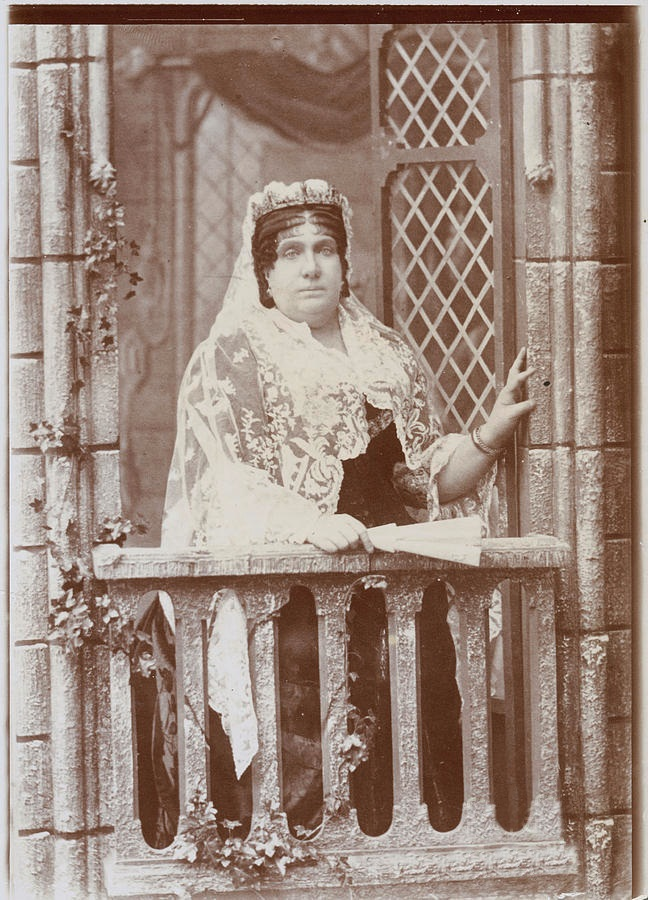
The former queen in Paris

Following the election to the Spanish throne of Amadeo of Savoy (second son of Victor Emmanuel II of Italy) in November 1870, Isabella reconciled in 1871 with her brother-in-law, the Duke of Montpensier, who assumed the political management of the family.

The First Spanish Republic that followed Amadeo's short reign was overthrown by a military coup started in Sagunto by General Arsenio Martínez Campos on 29 December 1874 that proclaimed the restoration of the monarchy and the Bourbon dynasty in the person of Isabella's son Alfonso XII, who landed in Barcelona on 9 January 1875.

After 1875 she lived in a relationship with Ramiro de la Puente y González Nandín, her secretary and chief of staff.

Cánovas del Castillo, the dominant figure of the new regime, became convinced that the figure of Isabella had become an issue for the Crown and wrote her a letter bluntly stating "Your Majesty is not a person, it is a reign, it is a historical time, and what the country needs is another reign, a different time", hellbent on avoiding the former queen stepping onto the Spanish capital before the proclamation of the new constitution in June 1876.

She returned to Spain in July 1876, stayed in Santander and El Escorial and was only allowed to visit Madrid for barely hours on 13 October. She moved to Seville, where she remained for a longer time and left for France in 1877. Isabella's son would marry Mercedes of Orléans (first cousin of Alfonso and daughter of the Dukes of Montpensier) in 1878, only for the latter to die five months after the wedding.

Isabella mostly lived in Paris for the rest of her life, based at the Palacio Castilla. She paid some visits to Seville.

She wrote her testament in Paris in June 1901, making her will to be entombed in El Escorial. Less than a month after passing through a cold categorised as "flu" by the physicians, she died on 9 April 1904, at 8:45 AM. Her corpse was moved from the Palacio Castilla to the Gare d'Orsay, and arrived to El Escorial on 15 April. The funeral took place on the next day at San Francisco el Grande.

== Issue ==
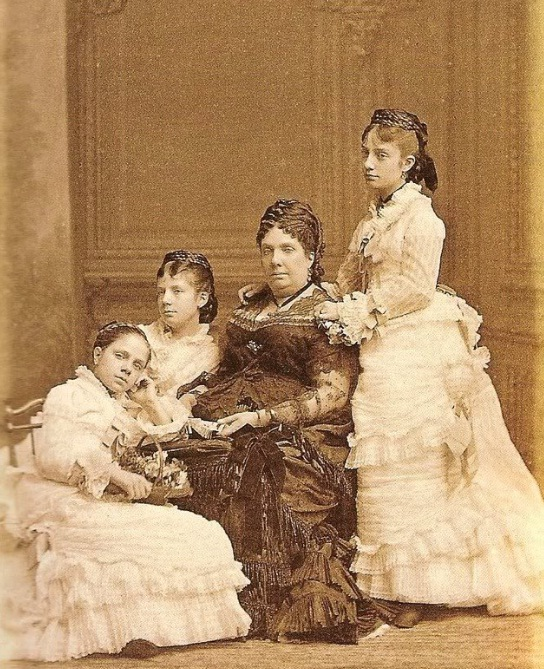
Isabella II with her three youngest daughters Pilar, Paz, and Eulalia.

Isabella had twelve pregnancies, but only five children reached adulthood:

- Infante Luis Fernando (20 May 1849 – 20 May 1849), stillborn.
- Infante Fernando Francisco (12 July 1850 – 12 July 1850), died five minutes after his birth.
- Infanta María Isabel (20 December 1851 – 22 April 1931): married her parents' first cousin Prince Gaetan, Count of Girgenti.
- Infanta María Cristina (5 January 1854 – 7 January 1854).
- Infanta Margarita (23 September 1855 – 24 September 1855), she was born prematurely.
- Infante Francisco de Asís Fernando (21 December 1856 – 21 December 1856), stillborn.
- Alfonso XII of Spain (28 November 1857 – 25 November 1885); future King of Spain.
- Infanta María de la Concepción (26 December 1859 – 21 October 1861).
- Infanta María del Pilar (4 June 1861 – 5 August 1879).
- Infanta María de la Paz (23 June 1862 – 4 December 1946); married her paternal first cousin Prince Louis Ferdinand of Bavaria.
- Infanta María Eulalia (12 February 1864 – 8 March 1958); married her maternal first cousin Infante Antonio d'Orléans, Duke of Galliera.
- Infante Francisco de Asís Leopoldo María Enrique (24 January 1866 – 14 February 1866).

There has been considerable speculation that some or all of Isabella's children were not fathered by Francisco de Asís; this has been bolstered by rumours that Francisco de Asís was either homosexual or impotent. Francisco de Asís recognised all of them: he played the offended, proceeding to blackmail the queen to receive money in exchange for keeping his mouth shut. The extortion by her husband would continue and intensify during Isabella's exile.

== Sobriquets ==
She came to be known by the sobriquets of the Traditional Queen (Spanish: la Reina Castiza), (Note: Due to her fondness for traditional Spanish cultural expressions in connection with Casticismo and Casticismo madrileño.) and the Queen of Sad Mischance (Spanish: la de los Tristes Destinos). (Note: After the 1907 work by Benito Pérez Galdós, La de los tristes destinos, part of the Episodios Nacionales. The use of the name in reference to Isabella II, however, dates back to 4 July 1865, when Antonio Aparisi Guijarro took the nickname from a verse in Shakespeare's Richard III. Thus, in Act IV-Scene IV, Queen Margaret tells Queen Elizabeth: Farewell, York’s wife, and queen of sad mischance: These English woes shall make me smile in France. Aparisi Guijarro made a reference to Isabella II in such a predictive fashion during a parliamentary session discussing the recognition of the Kingdom of Italy.)

== Honours ==
- Spain: Dame of the Order of Queen Maria Luisa, 10 October 1830
- Austria: Knight Grand Cordon with Collar of the Royal Hungarian Order of Saint Stephen
- Austria: Dame of the Order of the Starry Cross, 1st Class
- Brazil: Knight Grand Cordon of the Imperial and Royal Order of Christ
- Brazil: Knight Grand Cordon with Collar of the Imperial and Royal Order of the Southern Cross, 1848
- France
  - (Kingdom of France) Bourbon-French Royal Family: Knight Grand Cross of the Royal Order of the Holy Spirit
  - (Kingdom of France) Bourbon-French Royal Family: Knight Grand Cross with Collar of the Royal Order of Saint Michael
  - (Second French Empire) French Imperial Family: Knight Grand Cordon with Collar of the Imperial Order of the Legion of Honour
- (Kingdom of Bavaria) Bavaria: Knight Grand Cross with Chain of the Order of Saint Hubert
- (Kingdom of Bavaria) Bavaria: Dame Grand Cross of the Order of Theresa
- (Kingdom of Bavaria) Bavaria: Dame Grand Cross of the Order of Saint Elizabeth
- Saxe-Weimar-Eisenach: Knight Grand Cross of the Order of the White Falcon, 1 November 1861
- (Kingdom of Saxony) Saxony: Knight Grand Cross of the Order of the Rue Crown
- (Kingdom of Saxony) Saxony: Dame Grand Cross of the Order of Sidonia
- (Kingdom of Saxony) Saxony: Dame of the Order of Maria-Anna, Special Class
- Greece: Knight Grand Cross of the Order of the Redeemer
- Italy
  - (Kingdom of Italy) Italian Royal Family: Knight Grand Collar of the Supreme Order of the Most Holy Annunciation
  - (Kingdom of Italy) Italian Royal Family: Knight Grand Cordon of the Order of Saints Maurice and Lazarus
  - (Kingdom of Italy) Italian Royal Family: Knight Grand Cordon of the Order of the Crown of Italy
  - Holy See: Knight Grand Cross with Collar of the Supreme Order of Christ
  - (Kingdom of the Two Sicilies) Two Sicilian Royal Family: Knight Grand Cross with Collar of the Order of Saint Januarius
  - (Kingdom of the Two Sicilies) Two Sicilian Royal Family: Bailiff Knight Grand Cross with Collar of the Two Sicilian Sacred Military Constantinian Order of Saint George
- Mexico
  - Mexican Republic: Knight Grand Cross with Collar of the National Order of Guadalupe, 1854
  - (Second Mexican Empire) Mexican Imperial Family: Dame Grand Cross of the Imperial Order of Saint Charles, 10 April 1865
- Monaco: Knight Grand Cross of the Order of Saint-Charles, 17 September 1865
- (Kingdom of Portugal) Portugal: Knight Grand Cross of the Order of the Immaculate Conception of Vila Viçosa, 23 June 1834
- (Kingdom of Portugal) Portugal: Knight Grand Cross with Collar of the Order of the Tower and Sword
- (Kingdom of Portugal) Portugal: Dame Grand Cross of the Order of Saint Isabel

=== Honorific eponyms ===
- Philippines:
  - Cavite: Bridge of Isabel II
  - Isabela (province)
  - Isabela, Basilan
  - Manila: El Banco Español Filipino de Isabel II former name of the current Bank of the Philippine Islands.
- Puerto Rico:
  - Isabel II: barrio-pueblo (referred to as Isabel Segunda in Spanish) is a barrio and the administrative center (seat) in the downtown area in the island-municipality of Vieques, Puerto Rico.

== Ancestry ==
Ancestors of Isabella II

8. Charles III of Spain
4. Charles IV of Spain (= 14)
9. Maria Amalia of Saxony
2. Ferdinand VII of Spain
10. Philip, Duke of Parma
5. Maria Luisa of Parma (= 15)
11. Louise Élisabeth of France
1. Isabella II of Spain
12. Ferdinand I of the Two Sicilies
6. Francis I of the Two Sicilies
13. Maria Carolina of Austria
3. Maria Christina of the Two Sicilies
14. Charles IV of Spain (= 4)
7. Maria Isabella of Spain
15. Maria Luisa of Parma (= 5)

== Film portrayal ==
In the 1997 film Amistad, she was played by Anna Paquin.

== See also ==
- Philip V of Spain – monarch who implemented a Salic Law in the country
- Carl Schurz, who was U.S. ambassador to Spain for a brief time at the beginning of Lincoln's presidency, in his Reminiscences (New York, McClure's Publ. Co., 1907, Volume II, Chapter VI) describes Isabel II and her court.
- Isabela province in the Philippines.
- Mid-19th-century Spain
- Spain under the Restoration
- Plaza de Isabel II (Santa Cruz de Tenerife)

Isabella II House of Bourbon Cadet branch of the Capetian dynasty Born: 10 October 1830 Died: 9 April 1904
Regnal titles
Preceded by Ferdinand VII	Queen of Spain; 29 September 1833–30 September 1868	Vacant Title next held by Amadeo I
Spanish nobility
Vacant Title last held by Ferdinand (VII)	Princess of Asturias; 10 October 1830–29 September 1833	Succeeded by Isabella
Titles in pretence
Loss of title	— TITULAR — Queen of Spain; 30 September 1868–29 June 1870	Succeeded by Alfonso XII
