= Pedro Antonio de Alarcón =

Nineteenth-century Spanish novelist

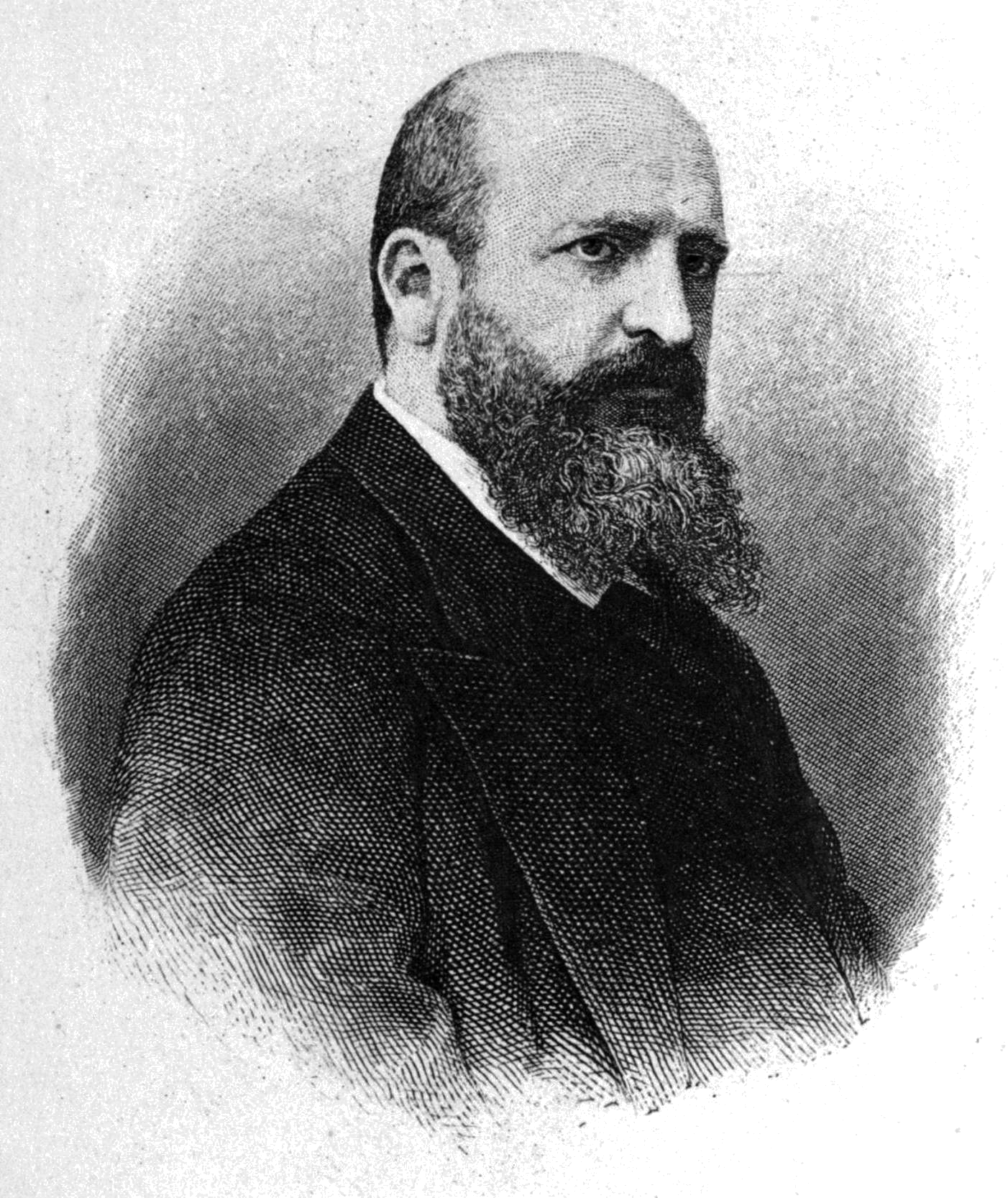
- Portrait published 1898
- Born: Pedro Antonio de Alarcón y Ariza; 10 March 1833; Guadix, Spain
- Died: 19 July 1891 (aged 58); Madrid, Spain
- Resting place: Cementerio de San Justo
- Occupation: Novelist
- Writing career
- Language: Spanish
- Literary movement: Literary realism

Seat H of the Real Academia Española
- In office 25 February 1877 – 19 July 1891
- Preceded by: Fermín de la Puente y Apezechea
- Succeeded by: Francisco Asenjo Barbieri

Pedro Antonio de Alarcón y Ariza (10 March 1833 – 19 July 1891) was a nineteenth-century Spanish novelist, known best for his novel El sombrero de tres picos (1874), an adaptation of popular traditions which provides a description of village life in Alarcón's native region of Andalusia. It was the basis for Hugo Wolf's opera Der Corregidor (1897); for Riccardo Zandonai's opera La farsa amorosa (1933); and Manuel de Falla's ballet The Three-Cornered Hat (1919).

Alarcón wrote another popular short novel, El capitán Veneno ('Captain Poison', 1881). He produced four other full-length novels. One of these novels, El escándalo ('The Scandal', 1875), became noted for its keen psychological insights. Alarcón also wrote three travel books and many short stories and essays.

Alarcón was born in Guadix, near Granada. In 1859, he served in the Hispano-Moroccan War. He gained his first literary recognition with Diary of a Witness, a patriotic account of the campaign.

== Works ==
- Cuentos amatorios.
- El final de Norma: novela (1855).
- Descubrimiento y paso del cabo de Buena Esperanza (1857).
- Diario de un testigo de la Guerra de África (1859).
- De Madrid a Nápoles (1860).
- Dos ángeles caídos y otros escritos olvidados.
- El amigo de la muerte: cuento fantástico (1852).
- El año en Spitzberg.
- El capitán Veneno: novela.
- El clavo.
- El coro de Angeles (1858).
- La Alpujarra (1873).
- El sombrero de tres picos: novela corta (1874).
- El escándalo (1875)
- El extranjero.
- El niño de la Bola (1880).
- Historietas nacionales.
- Juicios literarios y artísticos.
- La Alpujarra: sesenta leguas a caballo precedidas de seis en diligencia.
- La Comendadora.
- La mujer alta: cuento de miedo.
- La pródiga.
- Lo que se oye desde una silla del Prado.
- Los ojos negros.
- Los seis velos.
- Moros y cristianos.
- Narraciones inverosímiles.
- Obras literarias de Pedro Antonio de Alarcón. Volumen 2
- Obras literarias de Pedro Antonio de Alarcón. Volumen 1
- Obras literarias de Pedro Antonio de Alarcón. Volumen 3
- Poesías serias y humorísticas
- Soy, tengo y quiero.
- Viajes por España.
- Últimos escritos.
