= Plaza de Isabel II (Santa Cruz de Tenerife) =

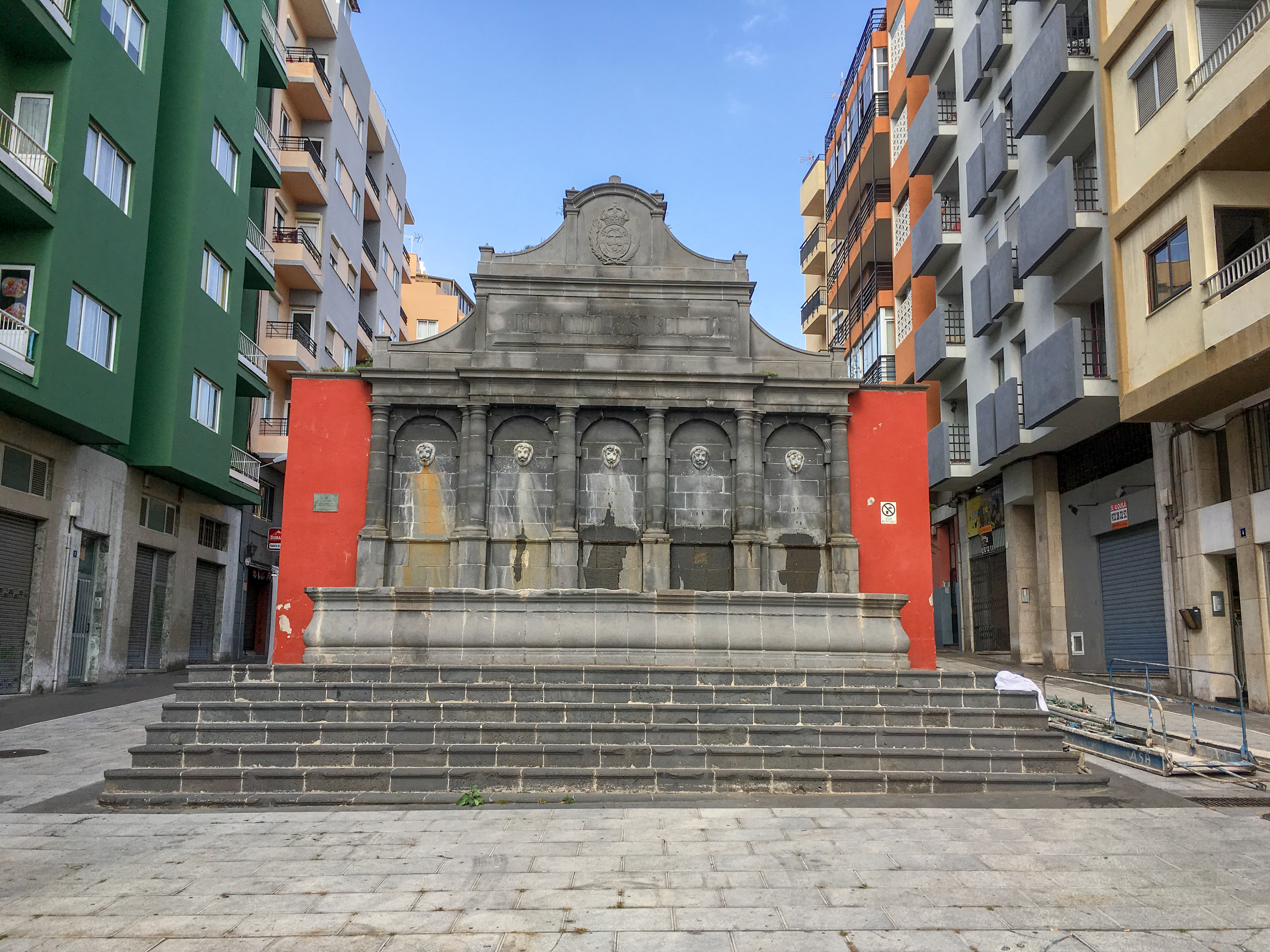

- Location within Tenerife
- Location: El Toscal, Santa Cruz de Tenerife, Canary Islands, Spain
- Coordinates: 28.4701°N 16.2479°W

The Plaza de Isabel II is a public square in Santa Cruz de Tenerife, Spain.

== Fountain ==
The Fuente de Isabel II was constructed in 1844, after several attempts to construct a fountain in El Toscal since the 1820s. It was designed by Pedro Maffiote, and is dedicated to Isabella II of Spain. It is located at the top of Calle de La Marina, between the streets of San Vicente Ferrer and Patricio Estévanez.

It is made from basaltic granite, and has a stepped base, with a water basin. The main part of the fountain has six Tuscan columns, with masks covering the water jets. The top shows the city's coat of arms.

It was one of six fountains operating in Santa Cruz in the 1880s, providing water between 7am and 2pm.
