= Jean-Louis Michel (fencer) =

- Jean Louis
- Born: 1785; Saint-Domingue/Haiti
- Died: 1865 (aged 79–80); Montpellier
- Burial place: Montpellier
- Military career
- Allegiance: France
- Unit: 32nd Regiment of the 3rd Division

Jean-Louis Michel (1785–1865) was a Haitian master in the art of fencing, sometimes hailed as the foremost exponent of the art of fencing in the nineteenth century.

== Biography ==
=== Early life ===
Jean-Louis was born in Saint-Domingue (now Haiti) in 1785. His father was a fencing coach for the French army In his youth, Jean Louis took part in a winner take all tournament to the death. In the final Jean-Louis, a slight man of around 5' 2", duelled for 1 whole hour with a Spanish opponent who was 6 ft tall. Then as the Spaniard lost concentration Jean-Louis finished him.

=== In Napoleon's Army ===
Jean-Louis served as a soldier in the French army under Napoleon.

He was most famous for a series of regimental duels held outside Madrid, Spain, in 1814. Italian soldiers from the 1st Regiment and French soldiers from the 32nd Regiment of the 3rd Division of the French Army quarreled. Within 40 minutes, Jean-Louis is reputed to have killed three Italian masters including the Florentine master, Giacomo Ferrari, and wounded 10 others with 27 thrusts.

On another occasion, having been subject to repeated insults, he insisted in defending himself using only a training foil against a larger opponent armed with a rapier. Jean Louis adopted the most familiar tactic of retreating until his opponent tired himself with a series of clumsy attacks, whereupon he suddenly parried strongly and riposted with a wicked slash to the face, thereby teaching him a lesson in humility.

On July 29, 1814, Jean-Louis was knighted by the Legion of Honour

=== Retirement ===
He refused a commission, and in 1830, he retired to Montpellier, where he opened a fencing school. In later life he taught that fencing to the death was a blight on society.

He was married to Joséfa Montes, a Spaniard, and they had a daughter who became a fencing champion.

In 1857, he was awarded the Medal of Saint Helena by Napoleon III

== Legacy ==
His style, which emphasised the conservation of movement, was a major influence on the French school of fencing, despite leaving no written record. This also led to his attempts to remove tierce from the classic parries.

He is credited with the sayings, "A foil should be held as one holds a little bird; not so tightly as to crush it, but just enough to prevent it escaping from the hand.", and "Fencing is the art of conciliation."

Vigeant said of him "Jean-Louis' face which appeared hard at first meeting, hid a soul of great goodness and generosity."

A Paris club continued his legacy named Salle D'Armes Jean Louis around 1900. The club had notable fencers at the club including M Broutin, Alphonse Kirchhoffer (Olympic silver medallist) and Léopold Ramus (6th at the Olympics).

The New Zealand fencing club, Salle Jean Louis, has a direct link to Jean Louis himself, through his Prevost, one Emmanuel Broutin to his son C. Leon Broutin, to two English fencers (John and Victor Millard), to Bert Raper. Salle Jean Louis was founded in Auckland by Bert Raper in 1955. He in turn instructed Brian Pickworth and Dot Guard.

The "Jean Louis" fencing style which was passed down was quite different to modern styles, with a central on guard position. As a result, fencers would develop a universal circular quarte parry, keeping the point on target followed by a quick direct riposte. This simple strategy mixed with excellent footwork meant that a beginner fencer was a very difficult opponent.
