= The Three-Cornered Hat (novel) =

1874 novel written by Pedro Antonio de Alarcón

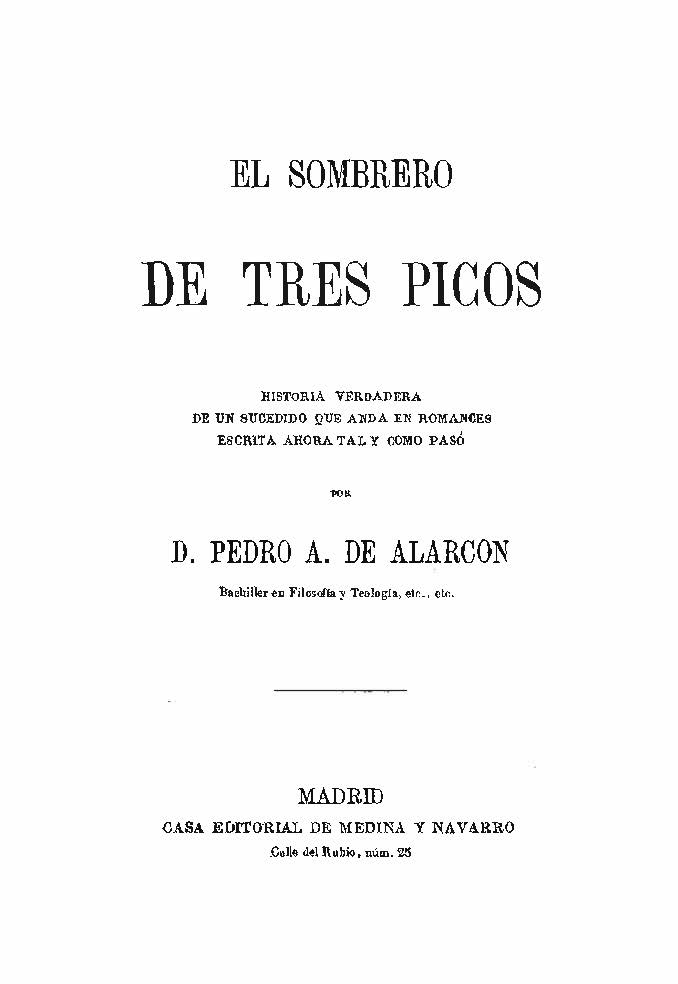
- Cover of the book
- Author: Pedro Antonio de Alarcón
- Original title: El sombrero de tres picos
- Language: Spanish
- Genre: Novel
- Set in: Andalusia
- Publication date: 1874
- Publication place: Spain

The Three-Cornered Hat (Spanish: El sombrero de tres picos) is a novel written by Pedro Antonio de Alarcón in 1874. The story of a magistrate infatuated with a miller's faithful wife is set in the province of Granada.

The piece should be classified as a short story and it contains popular tradition with a linear plot line. The novel has a theatrical format and it has been compared with the Miguel de Cervantes novel Don Quijote.

== Adaptations ==
The best -known adaptation is probably the ballet The Three-Cornered Hat with music by Manuel de Falla.

The Three-Cornered Hat has been adapted into:

- A musical comedy by Howard Dietz and Arthur Schwartz called Revenge with Music (1934),
- An opera composed by Riccardo Zandonai called La farsa amorosa (1933)
- An opera composed by Hugo Wolf called Der Corregidor. A Musical Comedy version by Bob Beare and Young Smith was produced by Main Street Theatre in Houston in 2002.
