= Der Corregidor =

1896 comic opera by Hugo Wolf

- Comic opera by Hugo Wolf
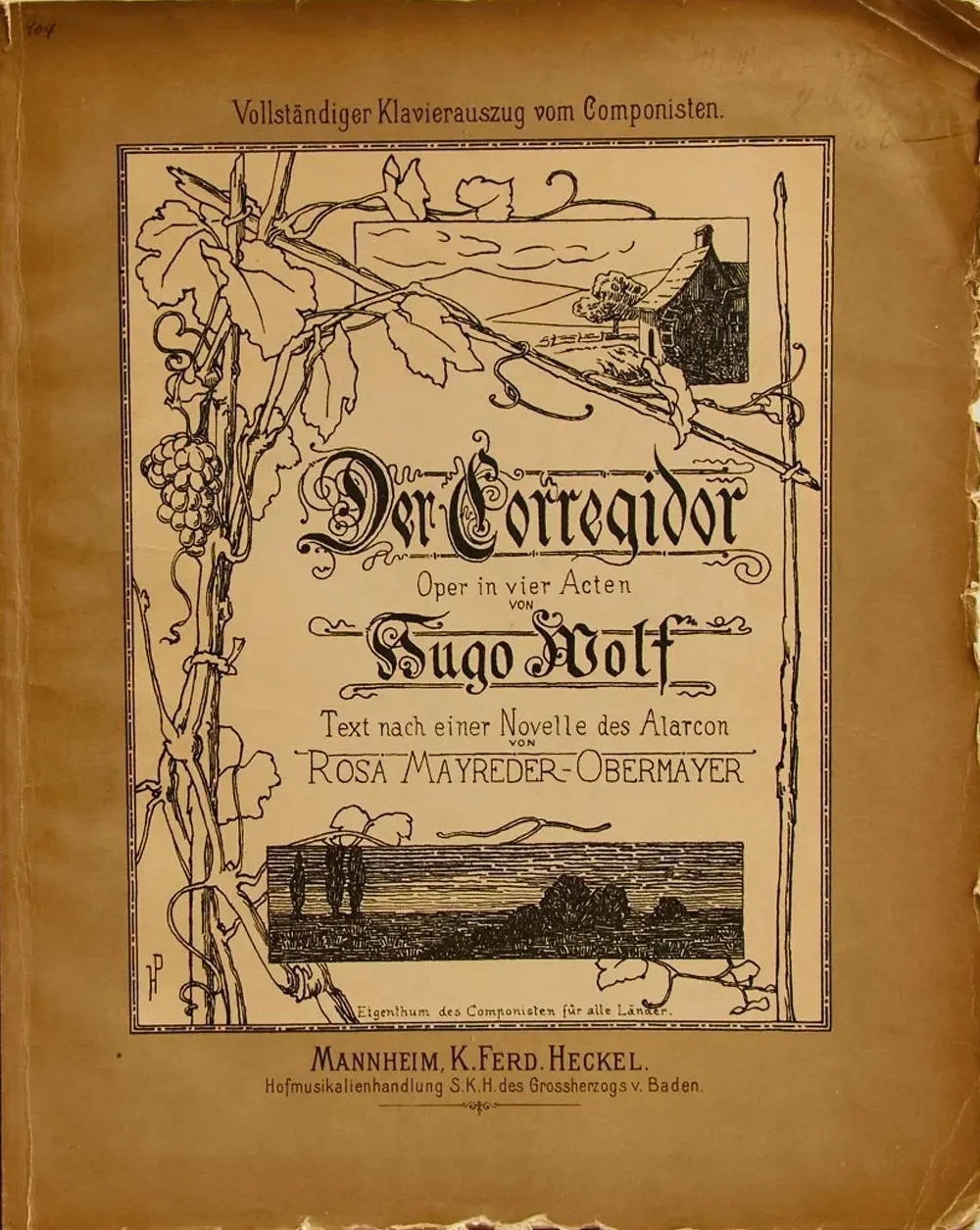
- Front cover of 1896 edition
- Librettist: Rosa Mayreder-Obermayer
- Language: German
- Based on: El sombrero de tres picos by Pedro Antonio de Alarcón
- Premiere: 7 June 1896; Mannheim National Theatre

Der Corregidor is a comic opera by Hugo Wolf. The German libretto was written by Rosa Mayreder-Obermayer, based on the short novel El sombrero de tres picos by Pedro Antonio de Alarcón.

== History ==
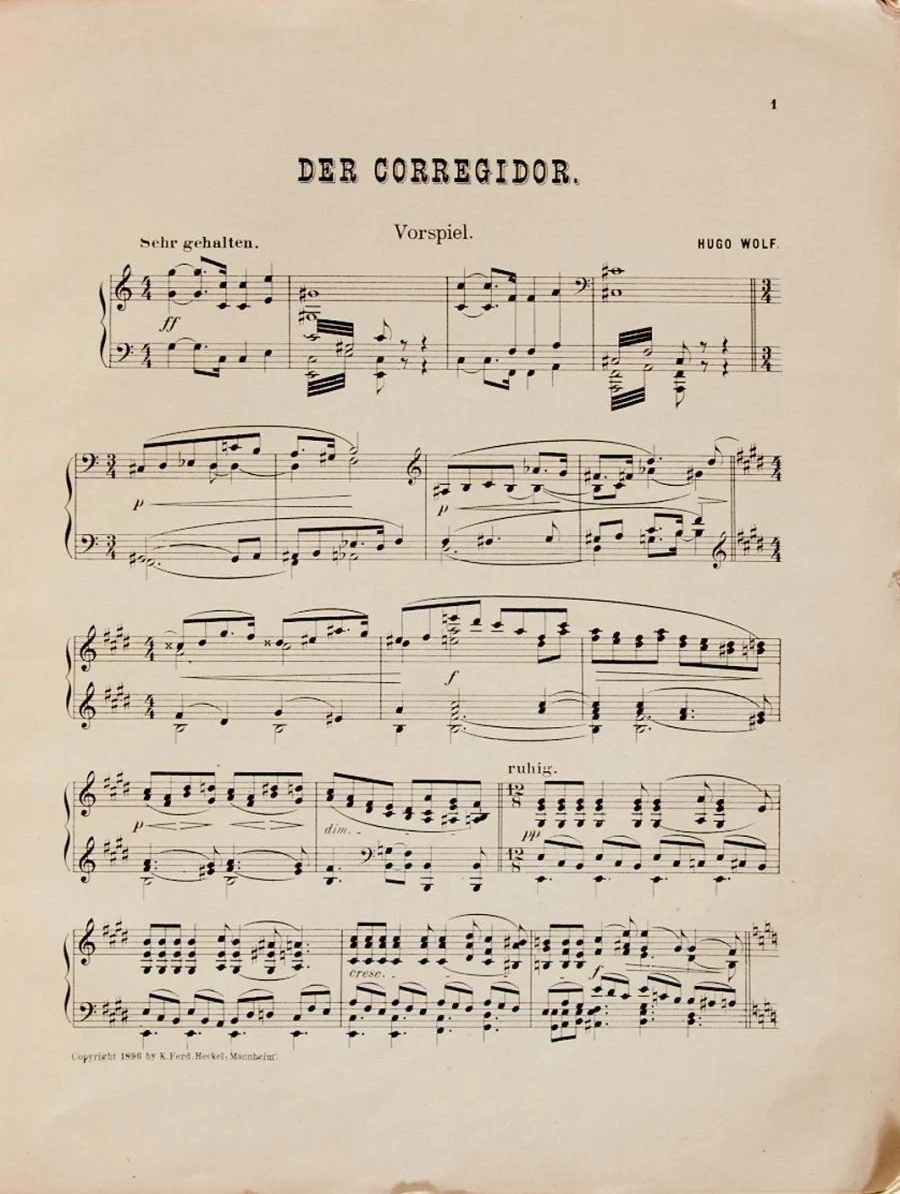
Part of the score

Wolf composed the opera in 1895 and revised it in 1897.

The opera was first performed at the Mannheim National Theatre on 7 June 1896 with Hugo Röhr as conductor.

Gustav Mahler made an arrangement of the opera's prelude.

== Roles ==
Roles, voice types, premiere cast
Role	Voice type	Premiere cast, 7 June 1896 Conductor: Hugo Röhr
Don Eugenio de Zuniga, Corregidor	buffo tenor	Hans Rüdiger
Juan Lopez, Alkalde	low bass	Georg Döring
Pedro, his secretary	tenor	Anton Friedrich Erl
Tonuelo, usher	bass	
Repela, the Corregidor's servant	buffo bass	Karl Marx
Tio Lukas, miller	baritone	Joachim Kromer
A neighbour	tenor	
Donna Mercedes, the Corregidor's wife	soprano	Anna Sorger
Frasquita, the miller's wife	mezzo-soprano	Helene Hohenleiter
Duenna, Donna Mercedes's housekeeper	contralto	Helene Seubert-Hansen
Manuela, the Alkalde's maid	mezzo-soprano	

== Synopsis ==
Time and place: in and around an unnamed village in Andalusia, in the year 1804.

=== Act 1 ===
Scene 1: Tio Lukas is picking grapes and preparing his millyard for the arrival of an unnamed Bishop and conversing with a neighbor. The neighbor taunts Lukas, saying that the only reason people show him any favor is because he has such a pretty wife. Lukas shrugs off the comment. The neighbor leaves, and Lukas climbs up into an arbor to continue his preparations.

Scene 2: Frasquita enters the yard and sets the table while singing to herself. Lukas surprises her from the arbor and teases her about the affections of the Corregidor, magistrate of the province in which they live. Lukas spies the Corregidor approaching with Repela, his servant, and goes back into hiding in order to spy on the old man's conversation.

Scene 3: Repela enters, taking a pinch of snuff and sneezing violently. Frasquita tells him that Lukas is asleep, which Repela is interested to know. He runs off to tell his master that Frasquita is apparently alone.

Scene 4: The Corregidor approaches Frasquita, who flirts with him and dances a fandango. He is afraid that her dancing might wake Lukas. She threatens to wake Lukas (with the song "In dem Schatten meiner Locken" from the Spanisches Liederbuch), but relents when the Corregidor urges her not to. The Corregidor is so taken by Frasquita that he is dumbstruck for a moment. He begins to woo her, and she seizes the opportunity to press for a favor she has obviously already requested many times: the appointment of her nephew as court notary in the nearby town of Estella. The Corregidor refuses, and his advances become ever more ardent. In his passion, he loses his balance and crashes to the ground. Lukas takes this cue to reveal himself. The couple ridicules the old man, who, realizing that Lukas has heard the entire exchange, childishly vows his revenge. Frasquita offers him some grapes in order to placate him, but he hesitates.

Scene 5: Repela, who has also been watching the entire scene, enters, intending to reprimand Frasquita for her behaviour. He is interrupted by the sound of the Bishop's arrival in the distance. Lukas and Frasquita rush off to finish their preparations, while the Corregidor sends Repela off to set his revenge plan in motion. The Bishop approaches amid an onstage brass fanfare.

=== Act 2 ===
Scene 1: In the kitchen at the millhouse, Lukas and Frasquita are eating dinner and discussing, first teasingly, then passionately, how happy they are together. They are interrupted by a knock at the door. It is Tonuelo, one of the Alkalde's servants, coming under the banner of the “rule of law.” He is very, very drunk.

Scene 2: Tonuelo summons Lukas to the Alkalde, the local mayor. Lukas says he will go in the morning, but Tonuelo insists that he come immediately. Frasquita wishes to accompany him, but Tonuelo again relays that he is to summon Lukas only. The two men exit, leaving Frasquita alone.

Scene 3: Frasquita begins to tidy up the dishes. She then sits down to her spinning wheel and muses to herself about Tonuelo's summons. From outside, she hears a sudden shout for help. Thinking it is Lukas, she rushes to the door, only to discover that it is the Corregidor, who has fallen into the millstream.

Scene 4: The Corregidor enters the house, soaking wet from the stream. Frasquita becomes angry, realizing at once what the Corregidor has intended all along. He attempts to bribe Frasquita into bed with her nephew's appointment, and when she refuses, he threatens her with a pistol. She in turn pulls out a blunderbuss, at which point the Corregidor is so overcome with fright that he becomes faint. He asks her to call Repela.

Scene 5: Repela enters to tend to the Corregidor, while Frasquita prepares to leave on the pretense of summoning a doctor from town. In reality, she leaves to find Lukas and to inform the Corregidora of what her husband is up to.

Scene 6: The Corregidor removes his wet clothes, instructing Repela to hang them by the fire to dry. Realizing that Frasquita is no longer there, he sends Repela off to intercept her before she reaches town. The Corregidor, alone, sings to himself, in another song from the Spanisches Liederbuch ("Herz, verzage nicht geschwind") about the strange behaviour of women.

At this point, the curtain drops, and the orchestra plays some brief scene-change music.

Scene 7: The Alkalde and his servants Manuela and Pedro are drinking together. Lukas and Tonuelo enter through a rear door.

Scene 8: The revelers drink to Lukas, even though he is clearly not in the mood to be trifled with. Lukas tricks the group into a drinking game, then pretends to go to sleep on a bench. The drunken servants go off to find their own beds.

Scene 9: Lukas, enraged, gets up and escapes out of the window.

Scene 10: After a few moments, Manuela enters the room to ask Lukas to hire her away from the Alkalde. Realizing that Lukas is no longer there, she rouses the rest of the household.

Scene 11: Pedro and Tonuelo join Manuela, and the three reluctantly go out to search for Lukas.

=== Act 3 ===
Scene 1: Frasquita makes her way to the Alkalde's house to find Lukas. Unbeknownst to either, Lukas passes her on his way back to the mill. She speaks to herself nervously. Repela enters, but Frasquita does not notice him yet.

Scene 2: Repela reveals himself. He mocks Frasquita, and she yells at him. They decide to go off together in search of Lukas. This is followed by another episode of scene-change music.

Scene 3: Lukas arrives back at the mill. He notices the Corregidor's clothes still hanging by the fire and the notary appointment on the table, and jumps to the obvious conclusion. Grabbing the blunderbuss, he creeps towards the bedroom door. Seeing the Corregidor asleep on the bed, Lukas berates himself quietly in a fit of humiliation and jealousy. Suddenly realizing that the Corregidor also has a pretty wife, he forms his own plan for vengeance. Donning the Corregidor's clothes and laughing, Lukas heads for the Corregidor's house.

Scene 4: The Corregidor, awoken by Lukas, cautiously comes out of the bedroom. Vexed that his own clothes have apparently been stolen, he puts on those that Lukas left behind. The Alkalde enters with Frasquita, Tonuelo and Repela, but they do not yet notice the Corregidor, who tries to slip back into the bedroom.

Scene 5: The Alkalde notices the Corregidor, but thinking he is Lukas, orders Tonuelo to apprehend him. Tonuelo knocks the Corregidor to the ground, but the group quickly realizes their mistake. After Repela divines Lukas's intent in stealing the Corregidor's clothes, everyone agrees to head off to the Corregidor's house.

=== Act 4 ===
Scene 1: In front of the Corregidor's house, a night watchman announces 5:30 AM.

Scene 2: The Corregidor, Frasquita, Repela, Tonuelo and the Alkalde arrive at the Corregidor's house. They knock, but there is no reply. Repela, making light of the situation, pretends that he is serenading the house by faking the sound of a guitar. Finally the Duenna wakes up and comes to the window. The Corregidor announces his presence, but the Duenna does not believe him, saying that the lord of the house is already home. Realizing who that must be, Frasquita despairs that Lukas did indeed think her unfaithful. The Corregidor does not understand what is going on.

Scene 3: A troop of officers and servants bursts out of the gate and start to beat the party. They try to run away and explain their presence at the same time. The chorus of soldiers sings confusedly. The Corregidor still does not understand what is going on.

Scene 4: Donna Mercedes, the Corregidora, appears in the plaza. Although she has already sized up the situation, she continues to treat her husband as if he were Lukas. The Corregidor, finally realizing what is going on, attempts to blame Frasquita for everything that has happened, but his wife does not let him get away with it.

Scene 5: Lukas enters, still dressed in the Corregidor's clothes and imitating the Corregidor's mannerisms. After everyone's true identity is revealed, the characters recap the story and explain what happened when Lukas arrived in disguise at the Corregidor's house (Wolf cut most of this section in his 1897 revision). Lukas and Frasquita are reconciled, and the Corregidor gives way, realizing that he has been bested. The ensemble thanks the Corregidora with respect and gratitude for her benevolent intervention.

== Recordings ==
There are two complete recordings (cast key is Conductor/Mercedes/Frasquita/Eugenio/Lukas/Repela):

- Karl Elmendorff/Marta Fuchs/Margarete Teschemacher/Karl Erb/Josef Herrmann/Georg Hann – 1944 – Urania, a performance recorded by German radio at the Semperoper in Dresden.
- Gerd Albrecht/Helen Donath/Doris Soffel/Werner Hollweg/Dietrich Fischer-Dieskau/Victor von Halem – 1985 – Koch Schwann
