= Giovanni Lucantoni =

Italian composer

Giovanni Lucantoni (Rieti, 18 January 1825 – Paris, 30 May 1902) was an Italian composer active as a music teacher in Paris. He had an opera performed in Milan at the age of 25, but later and in Paris turned to composing salon songs.

== Works, editions and recordings ==
=== Opera ===
- Elisa, opera, premiere 20 June 1850, Milan

=== Songs ===
- Una Sera di carnevale : album per canto e danza - Éditions Tito di Gio. Ricordi - Milan 1853
- Album di danza per pianoforte - Éditions Tito di G. Ricordi - Milan 1856 -
- Piano reduction of Donizetti's Poliuto Press F. Lucca - Milan
- Une nuit à Venise, duettino sur une poésie de Jules Barbier pour mezzo-soprano ou contralto et baryton- Éditions Choudens fils - Paris
- La Primavera, pour piano et chant soprano, tenor et basse. Éditions Choudens Père et fils. Paris c.1900?
