= The Three-Cornered Hat =

1919 ballet choreographed by Léonide Massine

- Picasso's costume design for the ballet
- Native title: El sombrero de tres picos
- Choreographer: Léonide Massine
- Music: Manuel de Falla
- Based on: The Three-Cornered Hat by Pedro Antonio de Alarcón
- Premiere: 22 July 1919; Alhambra Theatre
- Design: Pablo Picasso
- Genre: Spanish dance; Classical ballet

The Three-Cornered Hat (Spanish: El sombrero de tres picos or Le tricorne) is a ballet choreographed by Léonide Massine to music by Manuel de Falla. Commissioned by Sergei Diaghilev, the ballet premiered in 1919. In addition to its Spanish setting, this ballet also employs the techniques of Spanish dance (adapted and somewhat simplified) instead of classical ballet.

== History ==
In 1916-1917, Manuel de Falla composed the music for a two-scene pantomime El corregidor y la molinera (The Magistrate and the Miller's Wife). The plot was from Pedro Antonio de Alarcón's 1874 novel of the same title, adapted for the stage by María Martínez Sierra. The work premiered at Madrid's Teatro Eslava on April 6, 1917.

Sergei Diaghilev of the Ballets Russes had been introduced to de Falla by Igor Stravinsky during the company's first visit to Spain in 1916. Diaghilev requested permission to use de Falla's already-completed Noches en los jardines de España (Nights in the Gardens of Spain) and the work-in-progress El corregidor y la molinera for future choreographies, but only managed to secure permission for the latter.

In preparation for staging Spanish choreography, Diaghilev and Leonid Massine enlisted the services of teenage dancer Félix Fernández García, who accompanied the two men with de Falla on a tour of Spain in July 1917, introducing them to dancers and performances in Zaragoza, Toledo, Salamanca, Burgos, Sevilla, Córdoba, and Granada. Massine, Pablo Picasso, and de Falla worked separately on the choreography, sets/costumes, and music for the ballet over subsequent months; after some delays, the ballet was eventually premiered in London at the Alhambra Theatre on 22 July 1919. De Falla was called home to Granada at the last moment to see his dying mother. Ernest Ansermet conducted the premiere in place of de Falla.

Francisco Giménez-Rodríguez has investigated the performance history in Hungary of The Three-Cornered Hat (A háromszögletű kalap in Hungarian). Michael Christoforidis has studied the critical reaction to the initial performances of the ballet in Britain.

== Structure ==
The story of a magistrate infatuated with a miller's faithful wife, whom he attempts to seduce, derives from the novella of the same name by Pedro Antonio de Alarcón. Falla did not prepare "suites" from this work although excerpts are performed under this term. The music is in eight main sections, split across an introduction and two parts, or acts, with some bridging scenes:

Introduction

Part I

1. Introducción (Introduction)
2. La tarde (The Afternoon)
3. Danza de la molinera (Dance of the Miller's Wife) (Fandango) — El corregidor — La molinera
4. Las uvas (The Grapes)

Part II

5. La noche (At Night): Danza de los vecinos (Dance of the Neighbors) (Seguidillas)
6. Danza del molinero (Dance of the Miller) (Farruca) — Escena (Allegretto) — Las coplas del cuco (The Cuckoo Couplets) (Nocturno)
7. Danza del corregidor (Dance of the Magistrate) (Minué) — Allegro
8. Danza final (Final Dance) (Jota)

== Synopsis ==
=== Act I ===
After a short fanfare, the curtain rises revealing a mill in Andalusia. The miller is trying to teach a pet blackbird to tell the time. He tells the bird to chirp twice, but instead it chirps three times. Annoyed, the miller scolds the bird and tells it to try again. The bird now chirps four times. The miller gets angry at the bird again and his wife offers it a grape. The bird takes the grape and chirps twice. The miller and his wife laugh over this and continue their work.

Soon the magistrate, his wife, and their bodyguard pass by, taking their daily walk. The procession goes by and the couple returns to their work. The dandified, but lecherous, magistrate is heard coming back. The miller tells his wife that he will hide and that they will play a trick on the magistrate. The miller hides and the magistrate sees the miller's wife dancing. After her dance, she offers him some grapes. When the magistrate gets the grapes, the miller's wife runs away with the magistrate following her. Finally, he catches her, and the miller jumps out of a bush with a stick. The miller chases the magistrate away and the miller and his wife continue working.

=== Act II ===
That night, guests are at the miller's house. The miller dances to entertain them. His dance is interrupted by the magistrate's bodyguard, who has come to arrest him on trumped-up charges. After the miller is taken away, the guests leave one-by-one. The miller's wife goes to sleep and soon the magistrate comes to the mill. On his way to the door, the magistrate trips and falls in the river. The miller's wife wakes up and runs away.

The magistrate undresses, hangs his clothes on a tree, and goes to sleep in the miller's bed. The miller has escaped from prison and sees the magistrate in his bed. The miller thinks that the magistrate is sleeping with his wife and plans to switch clothes with the magistrate and avenge himself by seducing the magistrate's wife. The miller leaves, dressed as the magistrate, and the magistrate soon wakes up. He goes outside and sees that his clothes are gone, so he dresses in the miller's clothes.

The bodyguard comes and sees the magistrate dressed as the miller and goes to arrest him. The miller's wife sees the bodyguard fighting with what looks like her husband and joins in the fight. The miller comes back and sees his wife in the fight and joins it to protect her. The magistrate explains the entire story and the ballet ends with the miller's guests tossing the magistrate up and down in a blanket.

== Musical influences ==
Throughout the ballet, Falla uses traditional Andalusian folk music. The two songs sung by the mezzo-soprano are examples of cante jondo singing, which typically accompanies flamenco music and tells a sad story. At one point (the farruca), he quotes the opening of Beethoven's 5th Symphony.

== Selected discography (complete ballet) ==
For convenience, this discography focuses on recordings of the complete ballet of El sombrero de tres picos. Recordings of the original pantomime El corregidor y la molinera are separately listed. Artist information is listed as follows: orchestra, vocal soloist, conductor.

- Urania Records URLP 7034: Orchestre De L'Opéra-Comique, Amparito Péris De Prulière, Jean Martinon (1952)
- Columbia Masterworks ML 5358: Orquesta De Conciertos De Madrid, Celia Langa, Jesús Arámbarri (1959)
- Everest SDBR 3057: London Symphony Orchestra, Barbara Howitt, Enrique Jordá (1960)
- Decca LXT 5659: Orchestre de la Suisse Romande, Teresa Berganza, Ernest Ansermet (1961)
- HMV ASD608: Philharmonia Orchestra, Victoria de los Ángeles, Rafael Frühbeck de Burgos (1964)
- Turnabout TV34248S: Vienna Symphony Orchestra, Jean Madeira, Edouard van Remoortel (1968)
- Peerless Classics PC 29: The Cleveland Festival Orchestra, Renata Marcus, Walter Witenber (1974)
- Columbia M33970: New York Philharmonic, Jan DeGaetani, Pierre Boulez (1976)
- Deutsche Grammophon 2530 823: Boston Symphony Orchestra, Teresa Berganza, Seiji Ozawa (1977)
- Varèse Sarabande VCDM 1000.170: Orquesta Sinfonica Del Estado De Mexico, Maria Luisa Sarinas, Enrique Bátiz (1981)
- Decca 289 410-008-2: Orchestre symphonique de Montréal, Colette Boky, Charles Dutoit (1983)
- Philips 289 411-046-2: Pittsburgh Symphony Orchestra, Frederica von Stade, André Previn (1984)
- Delos DE3060: London Symphony Orchestra, Della Jones, Gerard Schwarz (1987)
- Telarc CD80149: Cincinnati Symphony Orchestra, Florence Quivar, Jesús López Cobos (1987)
- Chandos CHAN 8904: Philharmonia Orchestra, Jill Gomez, Yan Pascal Tortelier (1990)
- Auvidis Valois V 4642 Spanish National Youth Orchestra, Maria Lluisa Muntada, Edmon Colomer (1991 - reissued 2012 on Naïve)
- harmonia mundi HMX 2981606: Orquesta Ciudad De Granada, Itxaro Mentxaka, Josep Pons (1997)
- Naxos 8557800: Orquesta Sinfónica del Principado de Asturias, Maria Jose Martos, Maximiano Valdés (2005)
- Claves 502810: Real Filharmonía de Galicia, Marisa Martins, Antoni Ros-Marbà (2008)
- Hänssler Classic 93253: SWR Sinfonieorchester Baden-Baden und Freiburg, Ofelia Sala, Fabrice Bollon (2009)
- Chandos CHAN 10694: BBC Philharmonic, Raquel Lojendio, Juanjo Mena (2012)
- Classic Concert Records CCR62079: Orquesta Sinfónica Del Principado De Asturias, Ginesa Ortega, Rossen Milanov (2013)
- Capriccio C10461: Wurttembergisches Staatsorchester Stuttgart, Marcela de Loa, Garcia Navarro (2013)
- Pentatone PTC5186598: Orchestre de la Suisse Romande, Sophie Harmsen, Kazuki Yamada (2017)
- harmonia mundi HMM902271: Mahler Chamber Orchestra, Carmen Romeu, Pablo Heras-Casado (2019)
- Tritó TD00121: Orquestra Simfònica de Barcelona I Nacional de Catalunya, Marina Rodríguez-Cusí, Kazushi Ōno (2019)
- SOMM Recordings SOMMCD 0694: Ulster Orchestra, Sarah Redmond, Jac van Steen (2025)

=== Recordings of El corregidor y la molinera ===
- Virgin Classics VC 7 90790-2: Aquarius, Jill Gomez, Nicholas Cleobury (1994)
- harmonia mundi HMC 901520: Orquestra del Teatro Lliure, Ginesa Ortega, Josep Pons (1995)
- Claves 508405: Orchestre de Chambre de Lausanne, Teresa Berganza, Jesús López Cobos (1999)
- IBS Classical IBS82023: Orquesta Filarmónica de Málaga, Carol Garcia, José María Moreno Valiente (2023)

=== Film versions ===
The Paris Opera Ballet has issued a performance of the complete ballet on a DVD entitled Picasso and Dance. The performance uses not only Massine's original choreography, but actual reproductions of Picasso's sets and costumes.

== Bibliography ==
- Kennedy, Michael (2006). The Oxford Dictionary of Music. Oxford: Oxford University Press. ISBN 0-19-861459-4
