= Reign of Ferdinand VII of Spain =

Kingdom of Spain and the Indies/ Kingdom of the Spains Reino de España e Indias/ Reino de las Españas
- 1808–1833
- Flag of the Kingdom of Spain and the Indies/ Kingdom of the Spains Coat of arms
- Motto: Plus ultra (Further beyond)
- Anthem: Marcha Real; Himno de Riego (1820–1823)
- Spanish monarchy (Spain and the Indies) under Ferdinand VII. Spanish American independence was recognized after his death.
- Capital: Madrid
- Official languages: Spanish
- Religion: Catholicism

Government
  - King: Ferdinand VII (1814–1833)

Establishment
- History
  - Spanish American wars of independence: 1809–1829
  - Liberal triennium: 1820–1823
  - Restoration of Ferdinand VII: 1814
  - Decree annulling the decisions of the Cortes of Cádiz: May 4, 1814
  - Pronouncement of Riego: January 1, 1820
  - Beginning of Isabella II's reign: September 29, 1833
  - Established: 19 March 1808
  - Disestablished: 29 September 1833
- Currency: Escudo

The reign of Ferdinand VII lasted from 1808 to 1833, a period in Spain's contemporary history. He ascended the throne on March 19, 1808, immediately after his father, Charles IV, abdicated after the Aranjuez uprising. His reign ended upon his death on September 29, 1833.

Although Ferdinand VII became king in title after Aranjuez, he was held captive following his abdication in Bayonne in 1808. Nonetheless, he was recognized as Spain's legitimate monarch by the governing Juntas, the Regency, and the Cortes of Cádiz, as well as by the American Juntas. Between July 25, 1808, the proclamation of Joseph I, and the return of the captive Ferdinand VII, Spain effectively had no reigning monarch. After the final defeat of Joseph Bonaparte, who abandoned Madrid on May 27, 1813, Napoleon recognized Ferdinand VII as king of Spain through the Treaty of Valençay.

Ferdinand VII was released and returned to Spain on March 22, 1814, entering through Figueres. As the effective king, he promised to restore traditional Cortes and govern without despotism. Ferdinand gained widespread support, including that of 69 deputies of the Cortes through the Manifesto of the Persians, presented to him on April 16 in Valencia. With this backing, he led the Coup d'état of May 1814. He declared himself an absolute monarch, deeming the Cortes of Cádiz illegal along with all their decrees, as well as the rebellious juntas established in the Americas. In subsequent years, following a series of liberal uprisings in the Iberian Peninsula, Rafael Riego and Antonio Quiroga ultimately sparked a military revolt in 1820 that restored the Cortes during the Trienio Liberal (1820–1823). However, the civil war of 1822–1823 and the French-led "Expedition of Spain" reinstated absolutist rule, which lasted until Ferdinand VII died in 1833.

The period of Ferdinand VII's reign after reclaiming his throne is conventionally divided into three phases: the Sexenio Absolutista ("Six Absolutist Years"), the Trienio Liberal, and the Década Ominosa ("Ominous Decade").

== The first short reign (March–May 1808) ==
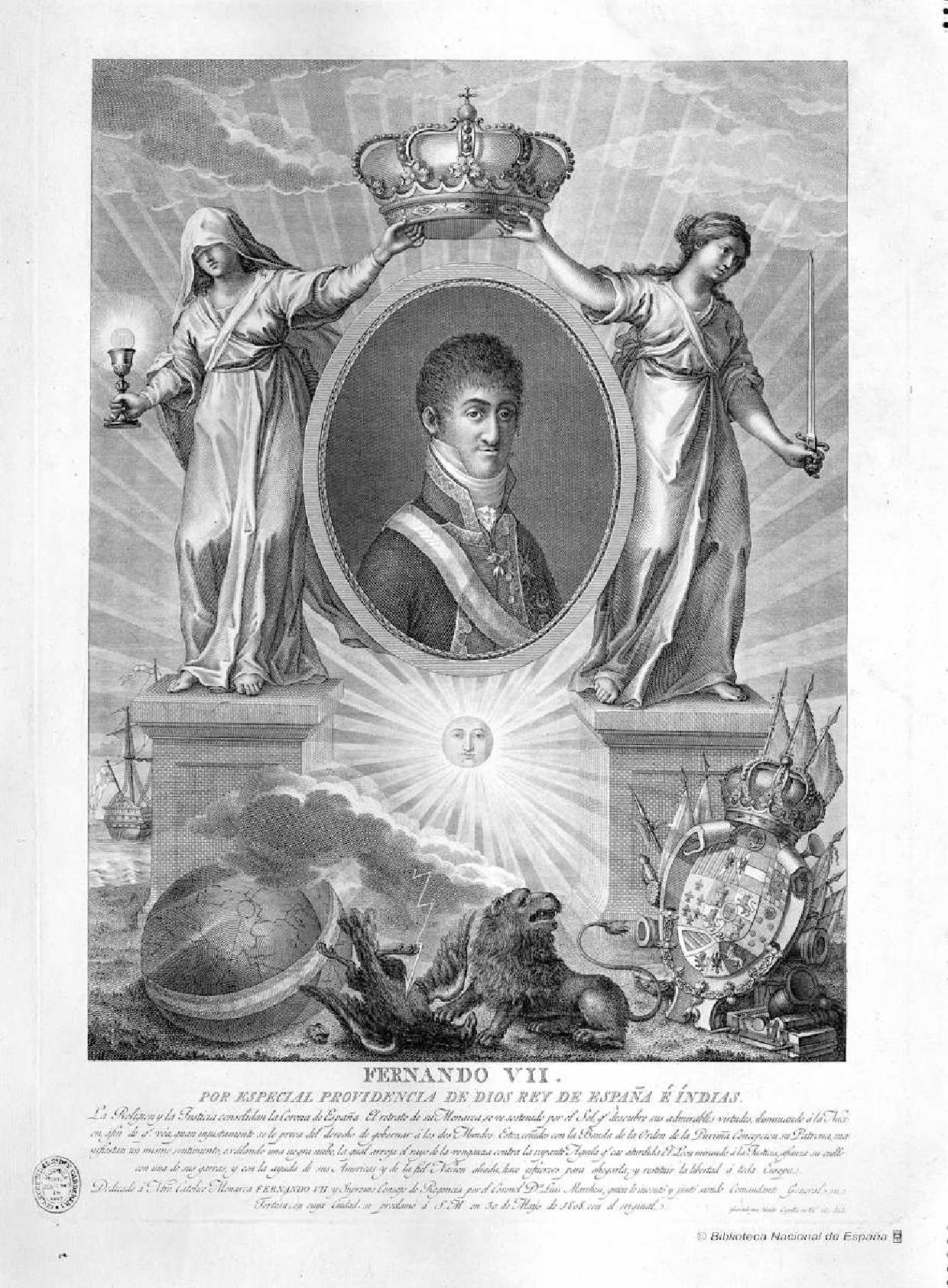
Allegorical portrait of Ferdinand VII by Vicente Capilla in 1810.

On March 19, 1808, King Charles IV abdicated in favor of his son Ferdinand, Prince of Asturias, under pressure during the Aranjuez uprising orchestrated by the aristocratic faction, or Fernandinos, which also led to the fall of Manuel Godoy, the king's favored minister. Napoleon Bonaparte, whose troops had entered Spain under the Treaty of Fontainebleau (1807) to invade Portugal but whose intention to dominate Spain became increasingly evident, decided to intervene in the Spanish dynastic crisis. Marshal Joachim Murat's troops had entered Madrid on March 23. Napoleon secured the presence of Charles IV, Ferdinand VII, and other royal family members in Bayonne. Ferdinand arrived on April 20, followed by his parents on April 30. News of the royal family's departure to Bayonne sparked the antifrench uprising in Madrid on May 2, later known as the "Dos de Mayo Uprising." This rebellion spread to other regions, where juntas or councils assumed power, marking the start of what would become the Peninsular War (Spanish War of Independence).

In Bayonne, under pressure and threats, Charles IV and Ferdinand VII relinquished their rights to the Spanish throne to Napoleon, who transferred them to his brother Joseph Bonaparte. Ferdinand, his brother Charles, and their uncle Antonio-Pascual were confined to the Château of Valençay. From there, Ferdinand expressed loyalty to Joseph Bonaparte, congratulated Napoleon on his victories in the Peninsular War, and sought recognition as one of Napoleon's "adoptive sons." The historian Michael Glover remarked, "The Spanish Bourbons never sank lower than this."

Meanwhile, Charles IV, his wife, and their youngest son, Francisco de Paula, were taken from Bayonne to the Palace of Compiègne and later moved to Marseille, eventually settling in Rome, where Charles IV died in 1819.

== The "absent king" and the Cortes of Cádiz ==
The abdication at Bayonne was not recognized by the juntas, which pledged allegiance to Ferdinand VII, while a minority—the afrancesados—supported Joseph I. Joseph took up residence in the Royal Palace of Madrid after the approval of the Bayonne Constitution, which governed his reign. The "patriotic" juntas, on the other hand, formed a Supreme Central Junta, later replaced by a Regency that assumed the functions of the "absent king," Ferdinand VII. In response to the French military advance, the Cortes were convened in Cádiz on September 24, 1810. On the same day, they agreed to recognize and proclaim "the one and only king, Lord Don Ferdinand VII of Bourbon" and declared the cession of the crown allegedly made in favor of Napoleon "null, void, and without any value or effect, not only due to the violence involved in these unjust and illegal acts but primarily because they lacked the consent of the Nation," in which, they affirmed, "national sovereignty" resided.

Subsequently, the Cortes of Cádiz drafted and approved a Constitution—opposed by the so-called "servile" deputies, supporters of absolutism—promulgated on March 19, 1812. Article 179 reaffirmed that the "King of the Spains" was Ferdinand of Bourbon. By instituting a constitutional monarchy and approving other decrees, the Cortes brought an end to the Ancient Regime of Spain and initiated "the long cycle of the Spanish liberal revolution."

The governing juntas exercised their own sovereignty in the name of the absent Ferdinand VII, both in the Iberian Peninsula and in the American territories. In Spain, after the disorder experienced by the juntas in 1808, the peninsular deputies imposed the majority model of a unitary monarchy, contrasting with the federalist model advocated by the American deputies.

== The Absolutist Six Years (Sexenio Absolutista) ==
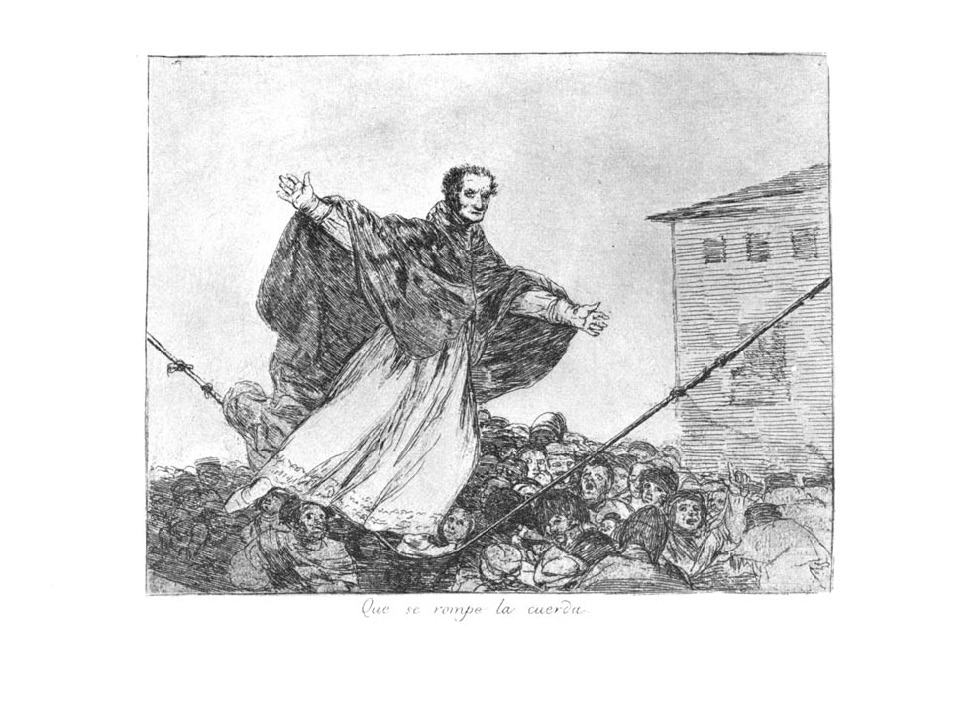
Que se rompe la cuerda! engraving by Goya from the Disasters of War series, depicting the Restoration of absolutism in the person of Ferdinand VII. According to Valeriano Bozal, this engraving depicts a high-ranking ecclesiastical figure (in the preparatory drawing in the Prado Museum, it's Pope Pius VII himself) balancing.

After the signing of the Treaty of Valençay in December 1813, Ferdinand VII was able to return to Spain. The following year, he carried out the Coup d'état of May 1814, which ended the constitutional regime and restored absolutism. Liberals were imprisoned, exiled, or left the country voluntarily.

During the subsequent six years (1814–1820), the king and his ministers failed to resolve the crisis of the Crisis of the Ancient Regime, which had begun in 1808 and been significantly worsened by the War of Independence (1808–1814). The conflict had destroyed the main engines of the economy, and trade with the Americas had declined as a result of the independence movements in the Spanish colonies, which began in 1810. This led to a severe economic crisis, characterized notably by deflation. The monarchy's treasury went bankrupt: American capital was no longer arriving in quantities comparable to those before 1808—causing a further decline in customs revenues—and it became impossible to rely on royal debt securities, whose value had plummeted due to repeated failures to pay annual interest. A budget reform attempt was undertaken by Martín de Garay but failed in the face of opposition from privileged classes—nobility and clergy—as well as from peasants, who rejected the tax increases because they would add to the burdens they already bore, especially at a time when the prices of agricultural products were beginning to collapse.

Faced with the ministers of Ferdinand VII's inability to resolve the crisis, the liberals—many of whom were members of Freemasonry to operate clandestinely—attempted to restore the constitutional monarchy by resorting to pronunciamientos. These aimed to secure allies among "constitutionalist" military officers (or those simply dissatisfied with the situation) to rise up against the government and trigger a chain reaction of uprisings from other military units, thereby forcing the king to recognize the Constitution of 1812.

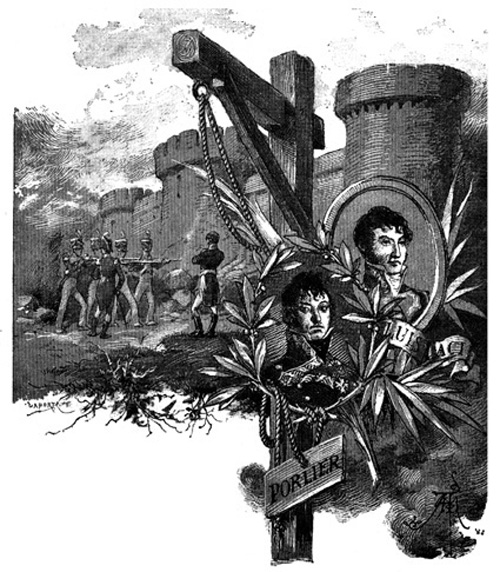
Illustration of La segunda casaca by Benito Pérez Galdós (1884), with General Luis Lacy's Bellver castle in the background. In the foreground are the commemorative medals of Lacy and General Juan Díaz Porlier, who was also tried (hanged, in the latter case) for "speaking out" against the absolutism of Ferdinand VII.

The repeal of the reforms introduced by the Cortes of Cádiz provoked significant discontent among many officers, further aggravated by delays in salary payments—some were even forced to accept pay cuts to receive regular payments—and the lack of promotion opportunities due to the oversupply of officers resulting from the War of Independence. Additionally, thousands of unemployed officers held the government's policies responsible for their dire situation, as these policies devalued those who had come from guerrilla warfare, had been promoted from lower ranks, or were perceived as liberals. Consequently, "many officers became receptive to liberal ideas as a result of the absolutist policies, which alienated a significant portion of its support base. Economic hardships and limited advancement opportunities did the rest." The bankruptcy of the Treasury necessitated multiple successive reductions in military personnel. The final reduction, in June 1818, once again disproportionately affected unemployed officers, particularly those who had served during the War of Independence.

Between 1814 and 1820, there were six attempts to overthrow the government, most through pronunciamientos, five of which failed before the success of Pronunciamiento de Riego. The Pronunciamiento of Espoz y Mina occurred in Navarre in September 1814, led by guerrilla hero Francisco Espoz y Mina, who, after failing to seize Pamplona, went into exile in France. The Pronunciamiento de Porlier was in La Coruña in September 1815, led by another war hero, General Juan Díaz Porlier, who was sentenced to death and hanged. In February 1816, a plot known as the "Triangle Conspiracy" was uncovered, led by former guerrilla fighter Vicente Richart, who was sentenced to death and hanged alongside another conspirator, Baltasar Gutiérrez. In April 1817, the fourth attempt took place in Barcelona, the pronunciamiento of Caldetas, with significant participation from the bourgeoisie and popular classes. It was led by the esteemed General Luis Lacy, who was also tried and executed. The fifth attempt occurred on January 1, 1819, in Valencia, led by Colonel Joaquín Vidal, resulting in his execution by hanging, along with twelve other non-military participants, including prominent city figures Félix Bertrán de Lis and Diego María Calatrava. While all these attempts sought to end absolutism, not all aimed to restore the Constitution of 1812. For instance, Vidal's sought a different regime, advocating for the return of Charles IV—unaware of his recent death in Naples—to the throne.

== Liberal triennium ==
=== Restoration of the Constitution of Cádiz ===
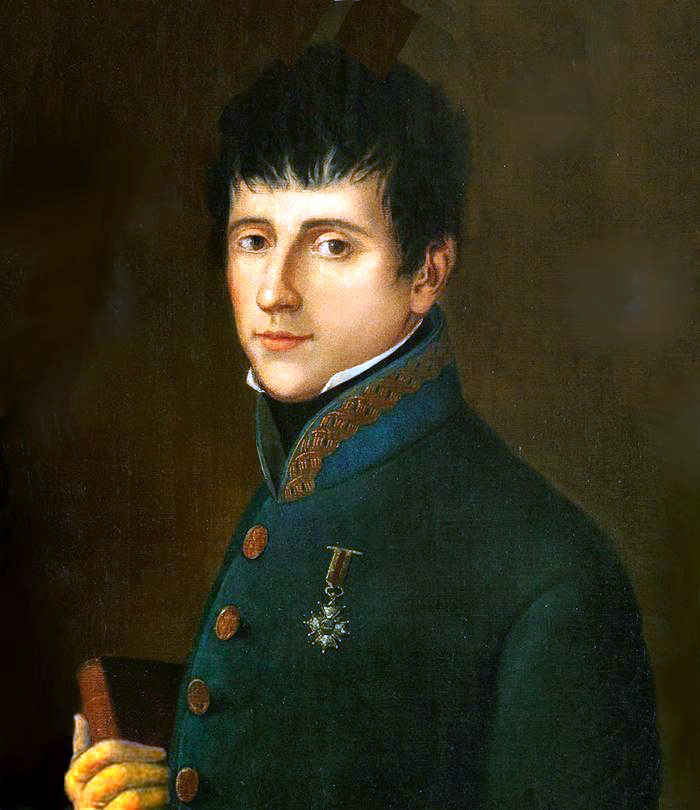
Lieutenant-colonel Rafael del Riego, later promoted to general, led the pronunciamiento that bears his name and put an end to the absolutist Sexenio.

After the triumph of the 1820 revolution, initiated by Pronunciamiento de Riego on January 1, Ferdinand VII issued a royal decree on March 7, stating: "[This] being the will of the people, I have decided to swear the Constitution promulgated by the General and Extraordinary Cortes in the year 1812." Thus began the second liberal experiment in Spain. Two days later, the king took an oath on the Constitution for the first time at the Royal Palace (the formal oath took place in July before the newly elected Cortes, according to the formula established by them), Abolition of the Spanish Inquisition the Inquisition, and appointed a provisional Junta chaired by Cardinal Bourbon, Archbishop of Toledo and the king's cousin, who had previously led the constitutional regency in 1814.

On March 10, the king issued a public manifesto announcing that he had sworn to uphold the Constitution, of which he would be "always the firmest supporter." The manifesto's final paragraph later became famous — as Ferdinand VII did not keep the promise made within it, "almost immediately after swearing on the Constitution, he began to work to overturn it":

Let us march forward frankly, I leading the way, along the constitutional path; and by showing Europe a model of wisdom, order, and perfect moderation during a crisis that, in other nations, has been accompanied by tears and misfortunes, let us inspire admiration and reverence for the Spanish name, while cultivating our happiness and glory for centuries to come.

The monarch appointed a government made up of moderate liberals, many of whom took a long time to assume their posts because they had to travel from the prisons or exile where they had spent much of the Sexenio Absolutista. For this reason, the king privately and disdainfully referred to it as the "government of the prisoners" (gobierno de los presidiarios). Most of them had already participated in the Cortes of Cádiz, which had approved the 1812 Constitution, earning them the name "doceañistas." The most notable members of this first government of the Triennium included Agustín Argüelles, who held the Secretariat of State for the Government of the Peninsula and adjacent islands, and José Canga Argüelles, who headed the Treasury.

After the general elections of 1820 — conducted through indirect male universal suffrage at three levels: parish, district, and finally provincial assemblies — the Parliament was formed. Its inaugural session took place on July 9, 1820, during which the king solemnly swore to uphold the Constitution.

=== Division of liberals: "moderates" vs. "exaltados" ===
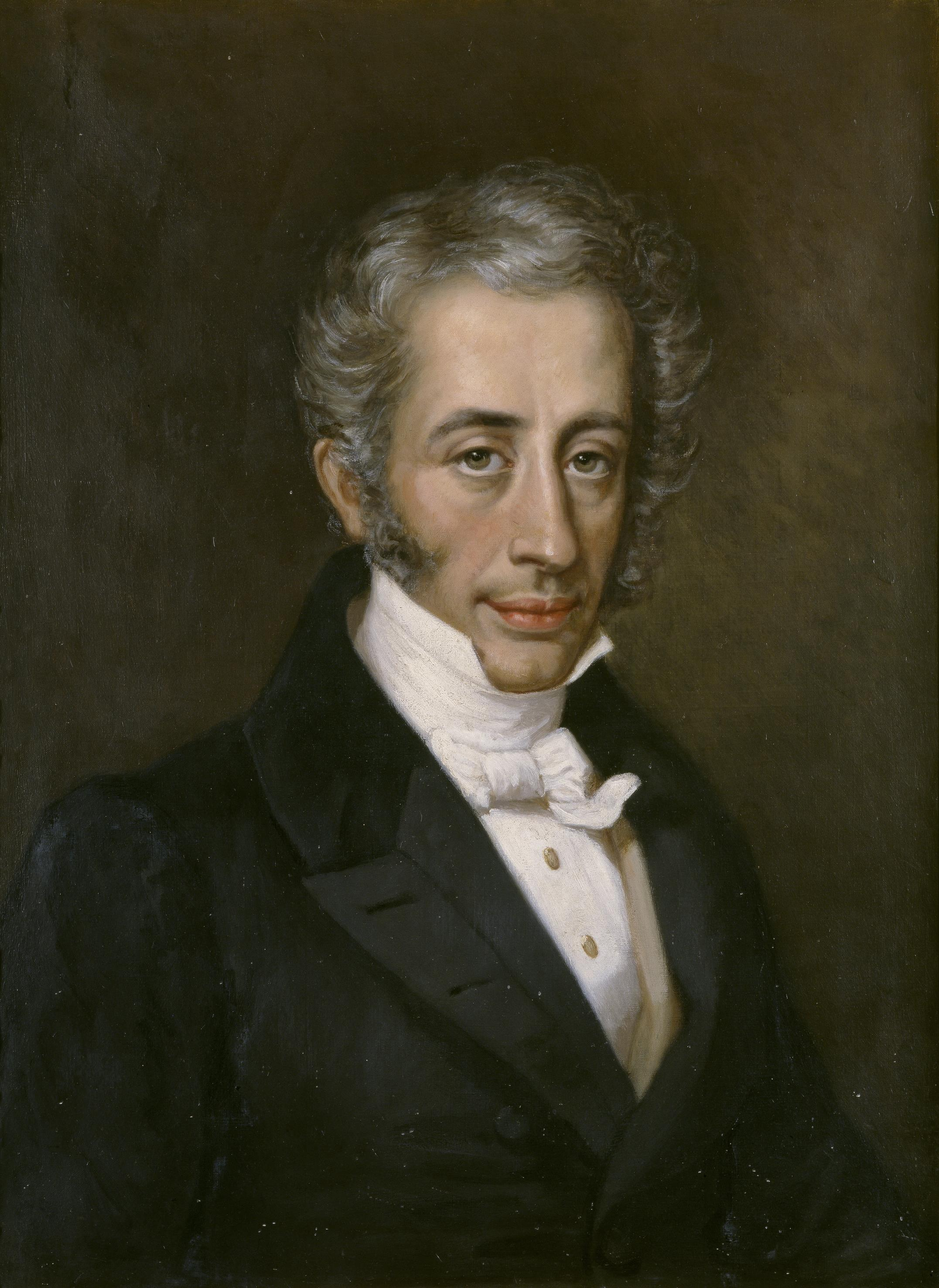
The moderate liberal Sociedad del Anillo Francisco Martínez de la Rosa, leader of the third government of the triennium.

During the early months of the new constitutional regime, a division emerged among the liberals who supported it: the moderates, representing the most conservative wing of Spanish liberalism, and the exaltados, who were more progressive. Both groups shared the same political project, initiated by the Cortes of Cádiz, to end absolute monarchy and the Ancient Regime and replace them with a new liberal regime, politically and economically. However, they primarily differed in the strategies to achieve this shared goal. The moderates — also called doceañistas because their most prominent members had been deputies in the Cortes of Cádiz — believed that the "revolution" was complete and that the priority was now to ensure order and stability by attempting to integrate the old dominant classes, such as the nobility, through compromise. The exaltados, on the other hand, thought the "revolution" needed to be further developed through measures aimed at garnering support from the popular classes.

They also differed in their approach to the 1812 Constitution itself: the moderates sought to reform it in a conservative direction, while the exaltados preferred to maintain it as it had been approved by the Cortes of Cádiz. The moderates, particularly their most conservative faction known as the Sociedad del Anillo and led by Francisco Martínez de la Rosa, wanted to introduce property-based suffrage and a second chamber where the territorial aristocracy would be represented as a counterbalance to the Congress of Deputies. They also advocated for fewer restrictions on royal power to grant more leeway to the executive branch.

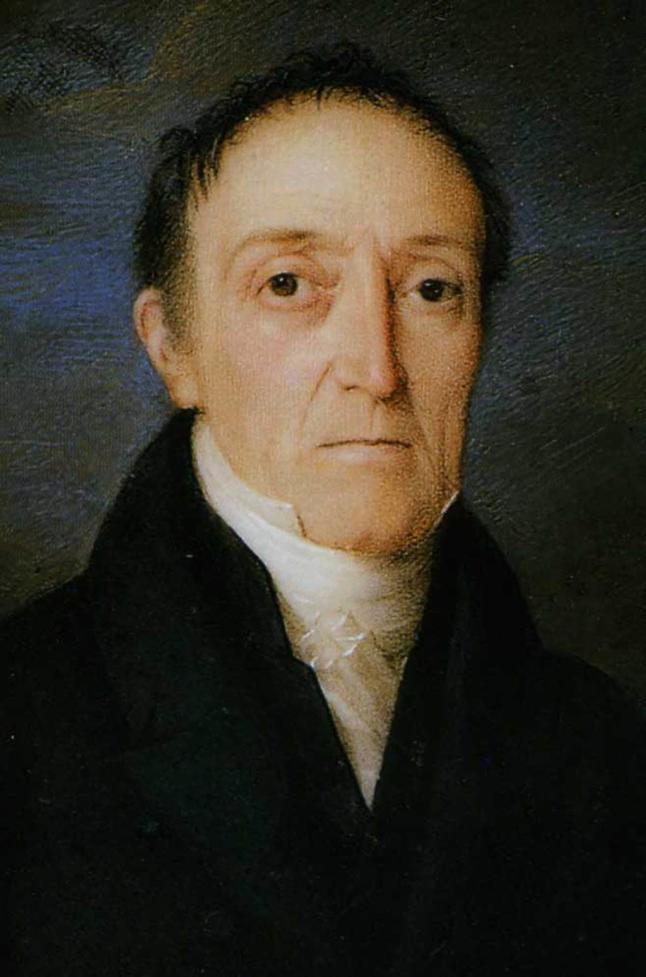
Álvaro Flórez Estrada, an outstanding member of the Exalted, defended the Patriotic society in the parliamentary debate on the Moderates' proposal to ban them.

The definitive break between the two factions occurred in October 1820 during parliamentary debates on the proposal to ban the sociedades patrióticas (Patriotic society). Since the summer of 1820, the moderates had come to view these societies "more as a threat to public order than as allies in defending the constitutional order," as the exaltados perceived them. The moderates saw these societies as "a kind of illegitimate counterpower that the exaltados used to offset their weak parliamentary representation," and thus incompatible with constitutional representation. Ultimately, the moderates, who held a majority in the Cortes, succeeded in passing a decree on October 21, 1820, banning the sociedades patrióticas as they had functioned until then. They were allowed to continue in a limited form—such as evening gatherings or patriotic meetings—under local authorities, who could suspend them at any time.

Another source of conflict between moderates and exaltados was the National Militia. The exaltados aimed to transform it into a revolutionary instrument ("the armed Nation"), while the moderates saw it as a guarantor of public order and constitutional stability (which they regarded as synonymous). The key issue was which social classes could join the militia. The moderates restricted it to "property-owning citizens" (with the cost of uniforms serving as a barrier to entry), while the exaltados sought to broaden its social base by enabling urban lower classes to join. To achieve this, they proposed various solutions, including subsidies, subscriptions, and patronage to help those who could not afford uniforms.

The conflict intensified at the end of 1821 when protests by the exaltados erupted against the dismissal of General Rafael del Riego, the hero of the 1820 revolution and a liberal icon, from his position as Captain General of Aragon on September 4. These protests escalated into a widespread civil disobedience movement in major cities like Cádiz and Seville. In all cases, the central government—led by Eusebio Bardají as Secretary of State—was rejected, as were the civil and military authorities it had appointed. The outcome was twofold: on February 28, 1822, the king appointed the third liberal government of the Triennium, known as the anilleros government because all its members belonged to the Sociedad del Anillo. Its leading figure was Francisco Martínez de la Rosa, who headed the Department of State. Meanwhile, the exaltados secured a majority in the Cortes after the Triennium's third elections. During the parliamentary opening session, Rafael del Riego, now a deputy for Asturias and president of the assembly, delivered a brief but tension-filled speech. He referenced the "difficult circumstances surrounding us," the "repeated machinations of the enemies of liberty," and concluded by stating that "the power and greatness of a monarch lie solely in the exact application of the laws."

=== Abolition of the Ancient Regime ===
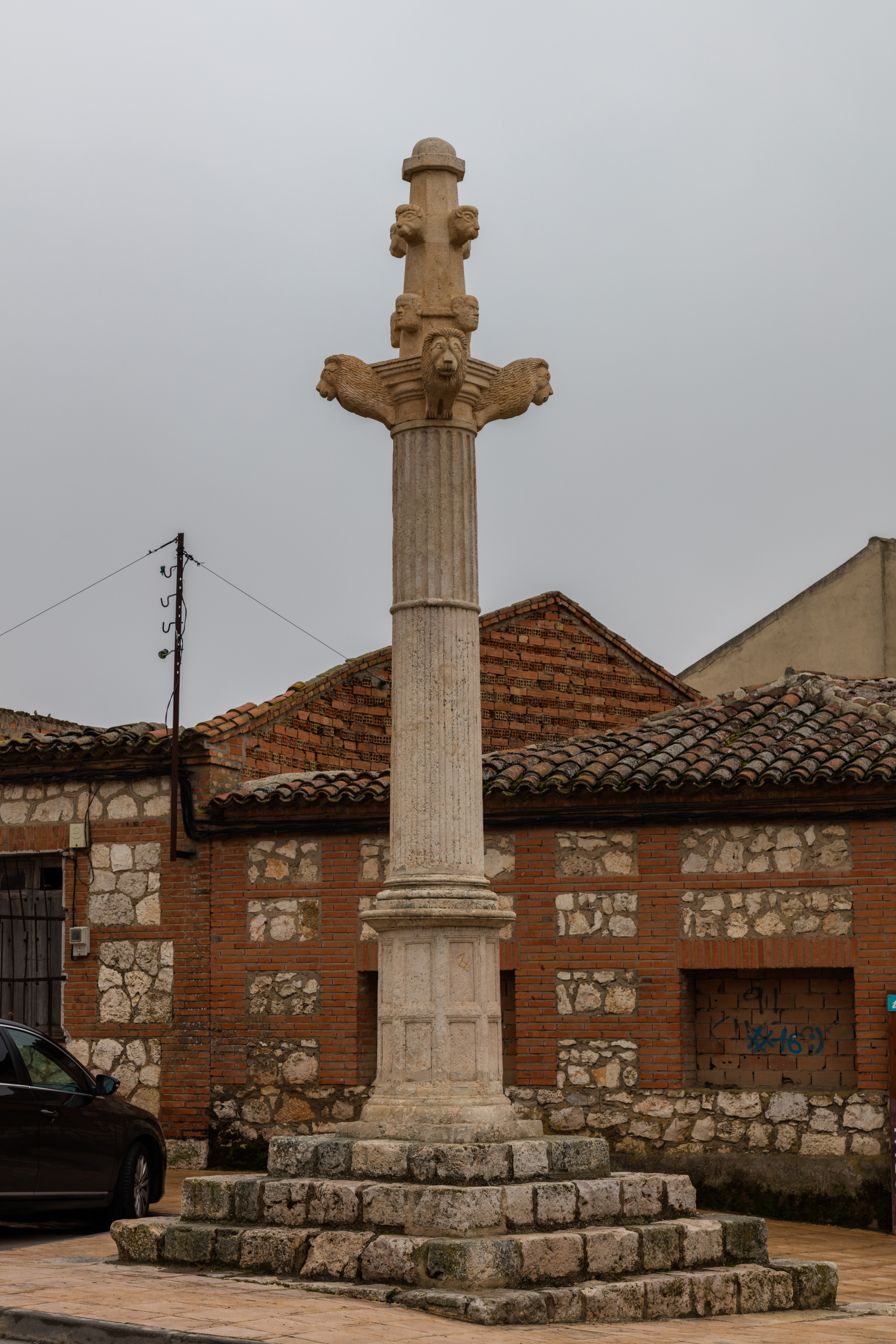
Torija pillory (Guadalajara province). The use of this instrument, a symbol of vassalage, was abolished by the Provisional Consultative Junta.

The Provisional Consultative Junta, appointed by Ferdinand VII on March 9, 1820—the same day he first swore on the Constitution—had already approved decrees aimed at dismantling the Ancient Regime. The Cortes continued this work. The first significant measure was the abolition of traditional hereditary practices—such as entailments and trusts—through a decree on September 27, 1820.

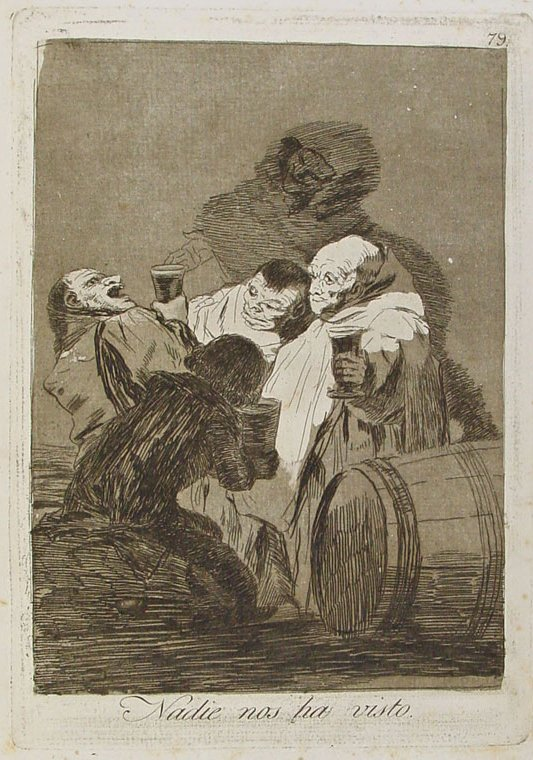
Nadie nos ha visto, engraving No. 79 from the Los Caprichos series (1799) by Francisco de Goya, depicting four religious brothers drinking, a response to the criticism levelled by the ilustrados (shared by the liberals) against the regular clergy.

The following month, on October 25, the Cortes approved the reform of the regular clergy, aiming primarily to reduce its excessively large numbers. This included the suppression of monastic and military orders and many convents of mendicant orders—by 1822, nearly half of Spain's convents had been closed. The decree also stipulated that no town could have more than one convent of the same order. The properties of dissolved monasteries and convents—like those of the Inquisition and the Jesuits—were subject to disentailment, passing to the state and then being sold at public auctions. However, no measures were taken to help peasants acquire these lands, which were mostly bought by the wealthiest landowners. In some cases, the situation of peasants worsened as new landowners raised rental fees or evicted them under the "property rights" they had acquired. The disentailment of monastic and mendicant properties was one of the main reasons why the majority of the clergy—especially regular clergy, who were the biggest losers under liberal policies—joined the counterrevolutionary camp. Along with some of the peasantry, they formed the "great anti-liberal alliance," whose most notable expression was the Partidas realistas, guerrilla groups acting as its armed wing, which began their activities mainly in 1821.

The liberal governments and the Cortes also addressed the issue of tithes but did not abolish them entirely, as the peasants had demanded. Such a decision would have left the Catholic Church in a precarious economic situation. Instead, they reduced tithes by half and required taxes to be paid to the state in cash. This latter requirement explains the paradox whereby the reduction of tithes (decreed on June 29, 1821) not only failed to alleviate the peasants' burdens but worsened them. The governments made a flawed assumption: they believed that by halving tithes, peasants would accumulate more surplus, which they could sell on the market. With the money obtained, they would then be able to pay the new state taxes (which, on paper, were lower than the halved tithe that had previously been paid in kind), thereby increasing their income. However, for the peasants, "the elimination of half the tithe might have meant more grain for their own consumption, but not more money—any increase in supply was immediately offset in these local markets [dominated by speculation from large landowners] by falling prices." When tax collectors arrived with new demands, the peasants found themselves unable to pay and came to perceive the new regime as an even greater form of fiscal oppression.

Regarding seigneuries, Parliament reinstated the decree of August 6, 1811, issued by the Cortes of Cádiz, which abolished them. However, it faced significant challenges in implementing this measure, leading to the approval of an "explanatory" law (aclaratoria) in June 1821. The central issue remained the presentation of titles: if the lords could present a title of "grant" for the seigneury that confirmed it was not jurisdictional, the seigneury became their property. Otherwise, ownership would revert to the peasants. However, the "explanatory" law was blocked by the king, who twice refused to sign it—invoking a prerogative granted to him by the Constitution of 1812. When the law was finally published in May 1823 (as the king could not refuse to sanction it a third time), it was too late. The French invasion, known as the Spain Expedition, which put an end to the constitutional regime, had already begun.

According to various historians, the disentailment of properties belonging to suppressed convents and the failed abolition of seigneuries were two major missed opportunities that could have encouraged peasants to support the revolutionary cause, as had happened in France.

=== Consolidation of the independence of American colonies ===
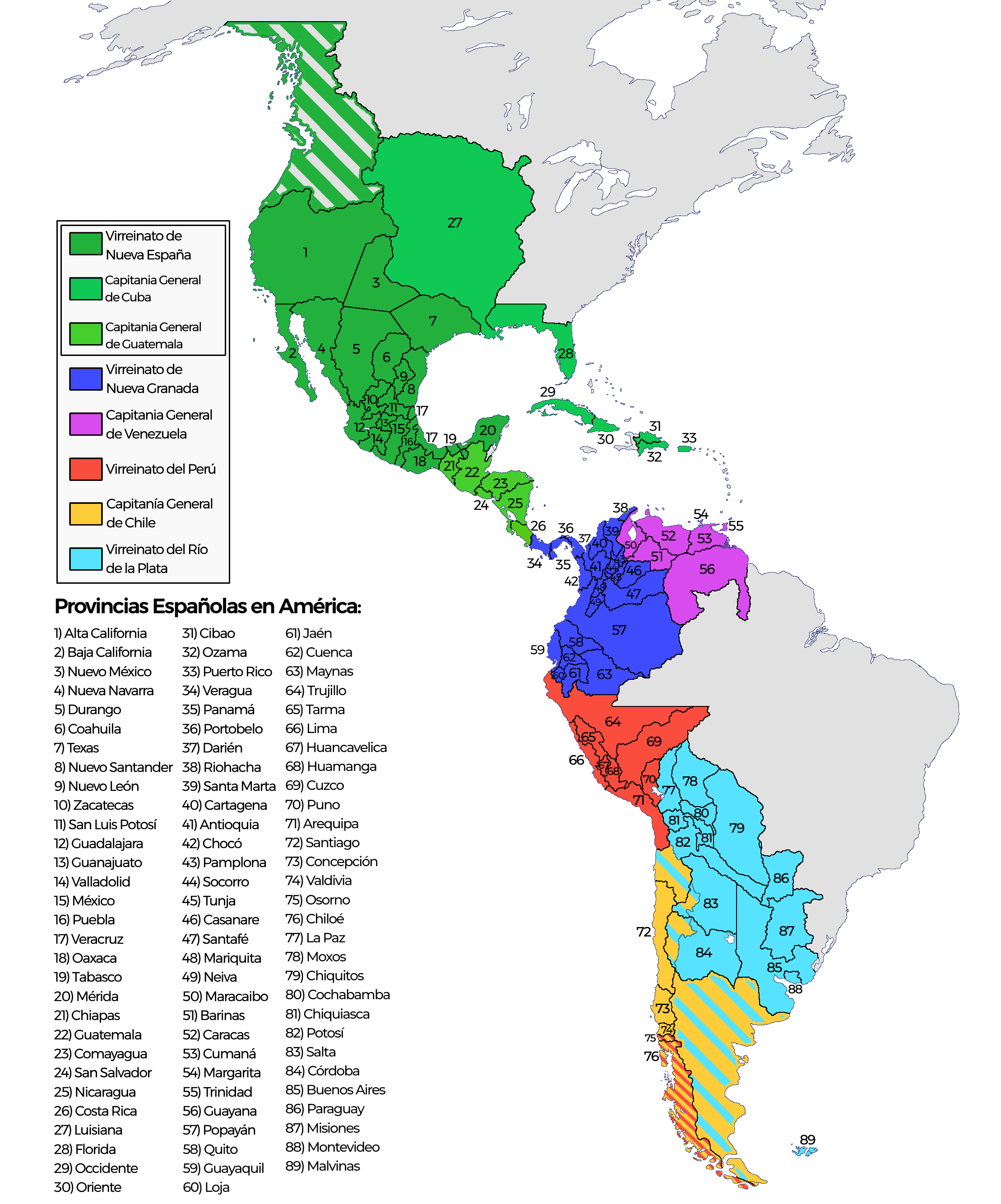
Spanish viceroyalties and provinces in America around 1800: Captaincy General of Cuba New Spain Captaincy General of Guatemala Viceroyalty of New Granada Captaincy General of Venezuela Viceroyalty of Peru Captaincy General of Chile Viceroyalty of the Río de la Plata

The processes of emancipation in Spanish America began around 1809. When Ferdinand VII swore allegiance to the Constitution on March 9, 1820, the Viceroyalties of New Spain and Peru remained loyal to the monarchy. However, the Viceroyalty of the Río de la Plata and much of New Granada had already declared independence, becoming, respectively, the United Provinces of the Río de la Plata and Gran Colombia, the latter presided over by Simón Bolívar.

In Spain, where the Hispanic-American wars of independence and the overall situation in Spanish America were followed with great anticipation by both the government and the Cortes, as well as the general public, there was widespread belief that the proclamation of the 1812 Constitution would end the insurrections and independence movements—and thus the war. A declaration from the Provisional Consultative Junta stated, "The pacification of America is now more a matter of policy than force... only the Constitution can restore the fraternal bonds that united it with the motherland."

On March 31, 1820, King Ferdinand VII issued a proclamation to overseas inhabitants, setting out the official position on the "American question." The Constitution guaranteed their rights, but insurgents were required to lay down their arms to receive a royal pardon. Otherwise, the war would continue, albeit "without the ferocity and barbarism seen until now, but in accordance with the laws of nations," as stated in the report by the Council of State. The Secretary of the Overseas Department, Antonio Porcel, arranged for representatives to be sent to America with instructions to achieve pacification, but this initiative came too late. The coup d'état of May 1814, which had restored absolutism and colonialism, was interpreted by many in the Americas as the end of a possible third path—between absolutist colonialism and outright insurrection—that the doceañista autonomist option had represented.

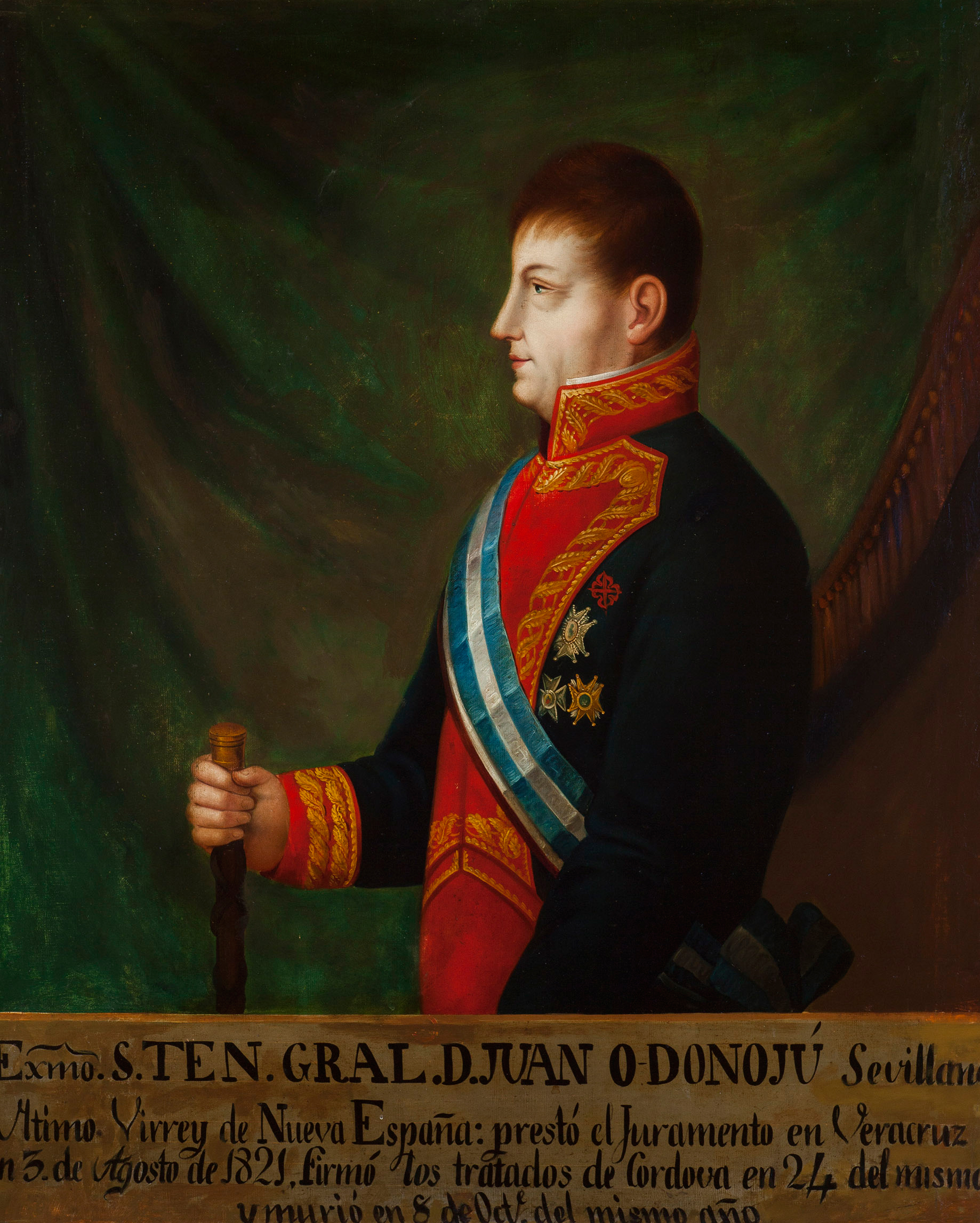
In August 1821, Juan O'Donojú, Senior political leader of New Spain appointed by the government in Madrid, signed the Treaty of Córdoba with Agustín Iturbide, leader of the independence movement, recognizing the independence of Mexico, which became the short-lived First Mexican Empire.

Shortly after the second session of the Cortes began on March 1, 1821, American deputies proposed establishing a provincial deputation in each of the American intendencias (administrative divisions), as part of their strategy to fully leverage the autonomy possibilities offered by the Constitution. The proposal was approved and promulgated by a decree dated May 8. However, other proposals by the American deputies were rejected and labeled "federalist"—a term synonymous with "republican" at the time—such as allowing the provincial deputations to appoint the Senior political leader instead of the central government or granting them the ability to collect and manage all taxes. Everything changed in mid-May or early June 1821 when news arrived of the Plan of Iguala, proclaimed by Agustín de Iturbide in February, which declared the independence of New Spain, soon to become the short-lived First Mexican Empire.

On June 25, 1821, just three days before the end of the second session of the Cortes, 51 American deputies, led by those from New Spain, presented a proposal to restructure the monarchy into a federation. This plan called for the creation of three sections of the Cortes, government, Supreme Tribunal, and Council of State, located in Mexico, Santa Fe de Bogotá, and Lima, each with the same powers as the metropolitan entities, except for foreign policy, which would remain under the Madrid Cortes' jurisdiction. Each of the three executive powers would be headed by a prince of the Bourbon dynasty, effectively forming three American monarchies under the authority of Ferdinand VII. According to Pedro Rújula and Manuel Chust, "By 1821, this proposal was already utopian. The Americans knew it, and so did the Spaniards. Ferdinand VII would never accept it."

The Cortes rejected the proposal, arguing primarily that its implementation would require constitutional reform. Instead, they approved the plan presented by the Count of Toreno, which left decisions regarding the pacification of America in the hands of the central government. The possibility of a negotiated solution for the independence of the American territories was thus abandoned, and the king's will prevailed. "In his closing speech to the Cortes on June 28, Ferdinand VII was categorical: the only option for America was the indivisible unity of the monarchy."

By the summer of 1821, events in America were accelerating. The delegate sent to Santa Fe de Bogotá reported the defeat of royalist forces on June 24 at the Battle of Carabobo by Simón Bolívar's troops. Later, it was learned that on July 15, General San Martín had proclaimed the independence of Peru in Lima. The following month, on August 24, 1821, Juan O'Donojú, the jefe político superior of New Spain appointed by the Madrid government, signed the Treaty of Córdoba with Agustín de Iturbide, leader of the independence movement. This treaty recognized Mexico's independence, leading to the creation of the ephemeral First Mexican Empire. Thus, by the summer of 1821, America was at war from north to south, and the metropolitan authorities had squandered an opportunity to better manage the situation.

=== Advance of the counter-revolution: Ferdinand VII's double game and the failure of the July 1822 coup ===
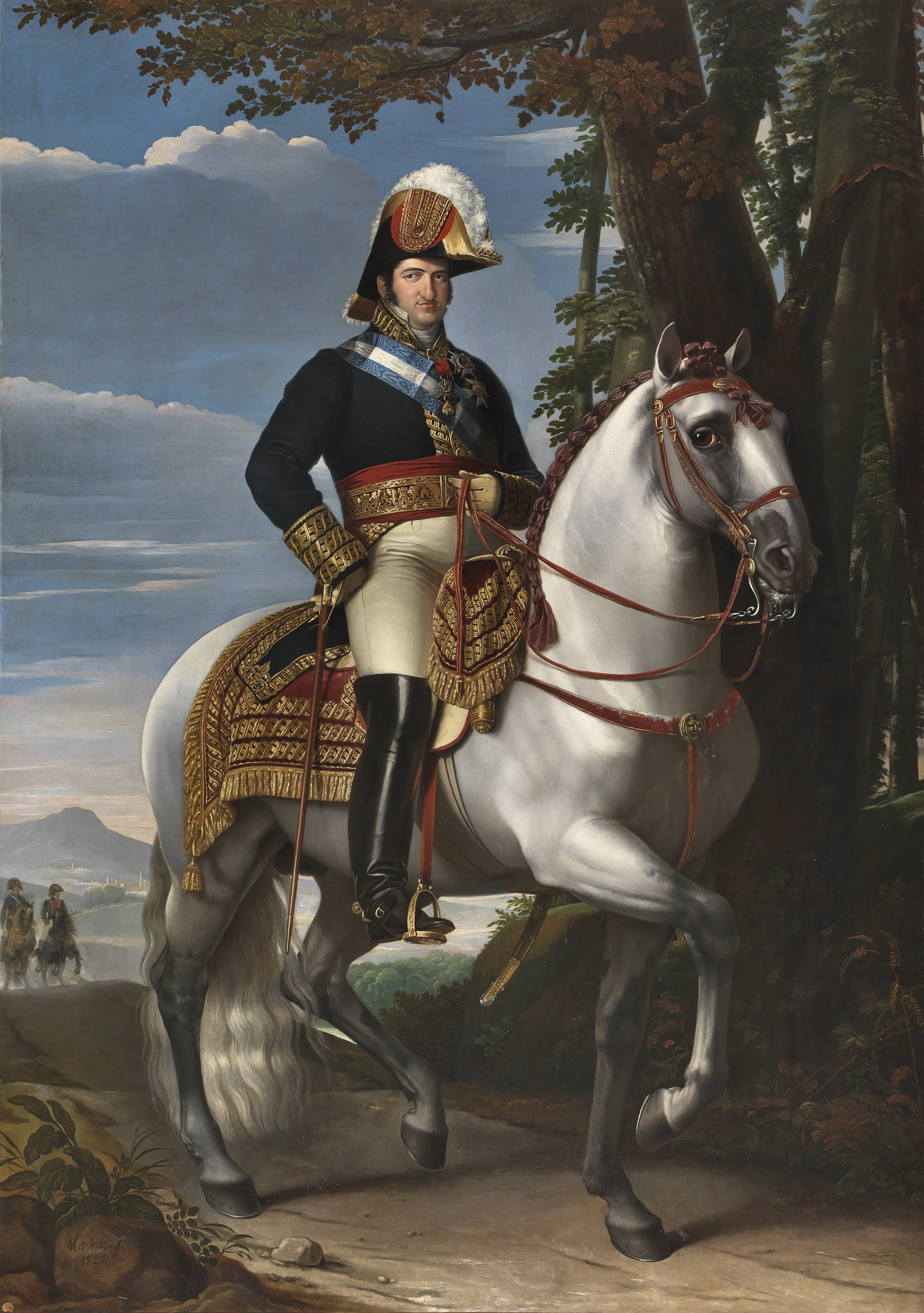
Equestrian portrait of Ferdinand VII by José de Madrazo (1821), Prado Museum.

The "counter-revolution" began as early as March 9, 1820, when Ferdinand VII swore allegiance to the Constitution of 1812 for the first time. The king himself led the counter-revolutionary efforts, as he never accepted the constitutional regime. Although he never outright broke with it, he conspired from the very beginning to overthrow it. "Ferdinand VII positioned himself at the center of initiatives against constitutionalism, not only for those involved in these actions to take his name as a banner, along with religion, but also because the king personally and directly led the most important actions intended to favor regime change."

The Partidas realistas began operating early—traces of the first ones can be found in Galicia as early as April 1820—organized by absolutists exiled in France and connected with the royal palace. The methods and tactics used by the partidas were very similar to those of the guerrilla fighters during the War of Independence. Some former guerrillas would later join the royalist camp.

For his part, Ferdinand VII made use of his constitutional powers, such as the suspensive veto, up to two times, to block, delay, or, in some cases, prevent the promulgation of certain laws approved by the Cortes. This occurred with the law on monastic orders and the reform of the regular clergy, which the king refused to sanction, citing issues of conscience, although he ultimately signed them after significant unrest in the streets of Madrid. Moreover, he frequently clashed with government members. On one occasion, he told them: "You are the only defenders the constitution gives me, and yet you abandon me... You consent to these patriotic societies and other disorders, with which it is impossible to govern, and in a word, you abandon me, the only one who faithfully follows the constitution." The historian Josep Fontana comments: "He was lying, of course, because he was conspiring behind the back of his government, encouraging the partidas realistas, attempting to create regencies abroad, and begging the monarchs of the Holy Alliance to come and free him from this horrible captivity. The Ferdinand who protests about respecting the constitution is the same one who secretly corresponded with Louis XVIII of France and the Tsar of Russia."

On the other hand, Ferdinand VII was involved in the absolutist conspiracy led by Father Matías Vinuesa, the king's chaplain, which was discovered in January 1821. When the sentence condemning Vinuesa to ten years in prison was made public on May 4, an alleged group of "exalted" liberals, who found the sentence too lenient, stormed the prison where he was held and murdered him with hammers.

In the spring of 1822, the actions of the partidas realistas increased significantly, especially in Catalonia, Navarre, Galicia, Aragon, and Valencia. Several attempts at absolutist rebellions occurred, the most important being in Valencia on May 30, 1822, which was crushed the following day. On September 4, General Elío, who had been the author of the pronouncement that restored absolutism in 1814, was executed by garrote after he led artillerymen from the Citadel of Valencia in a revolt.

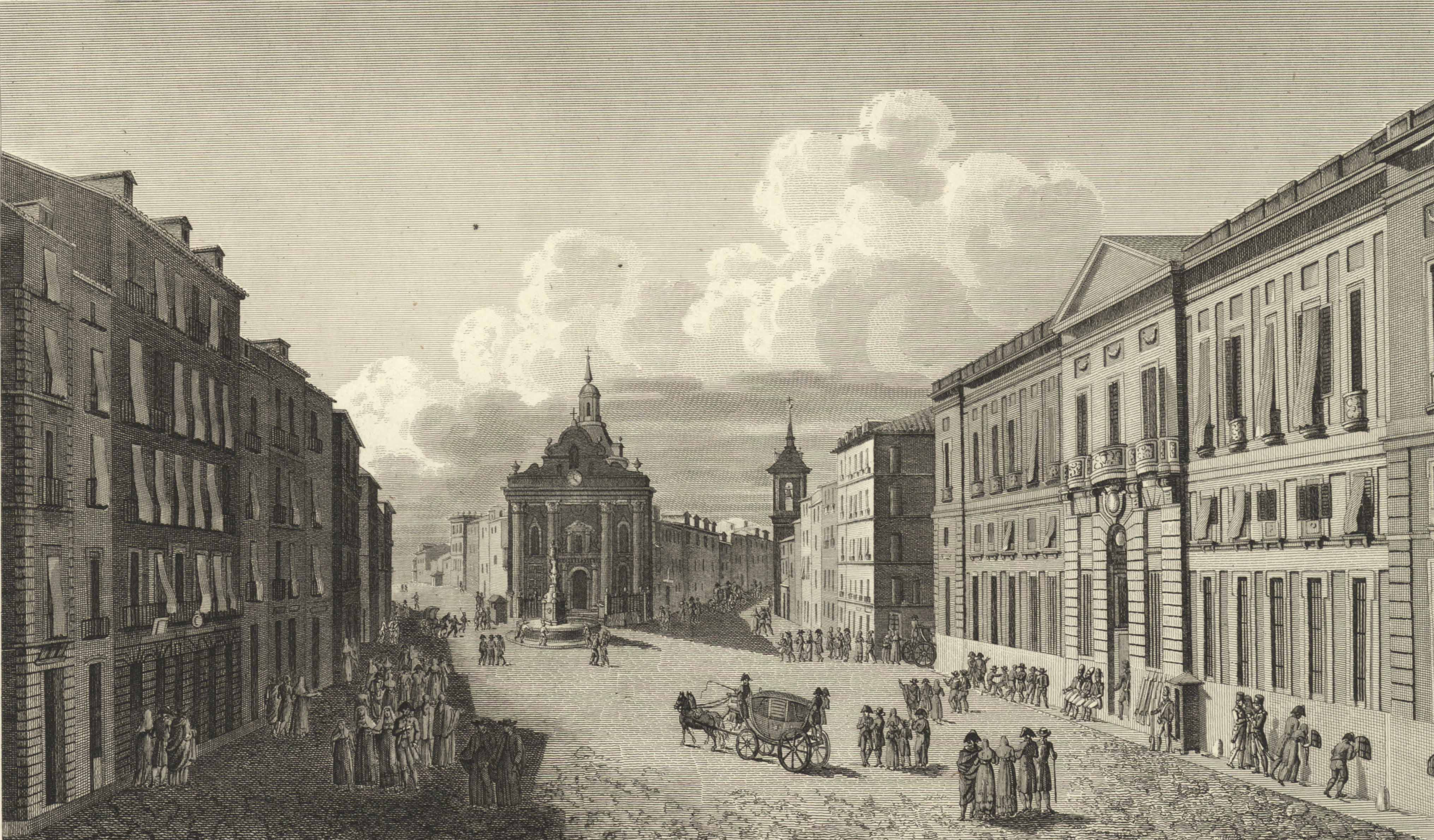
View of the Puerta del Sol in 1820.

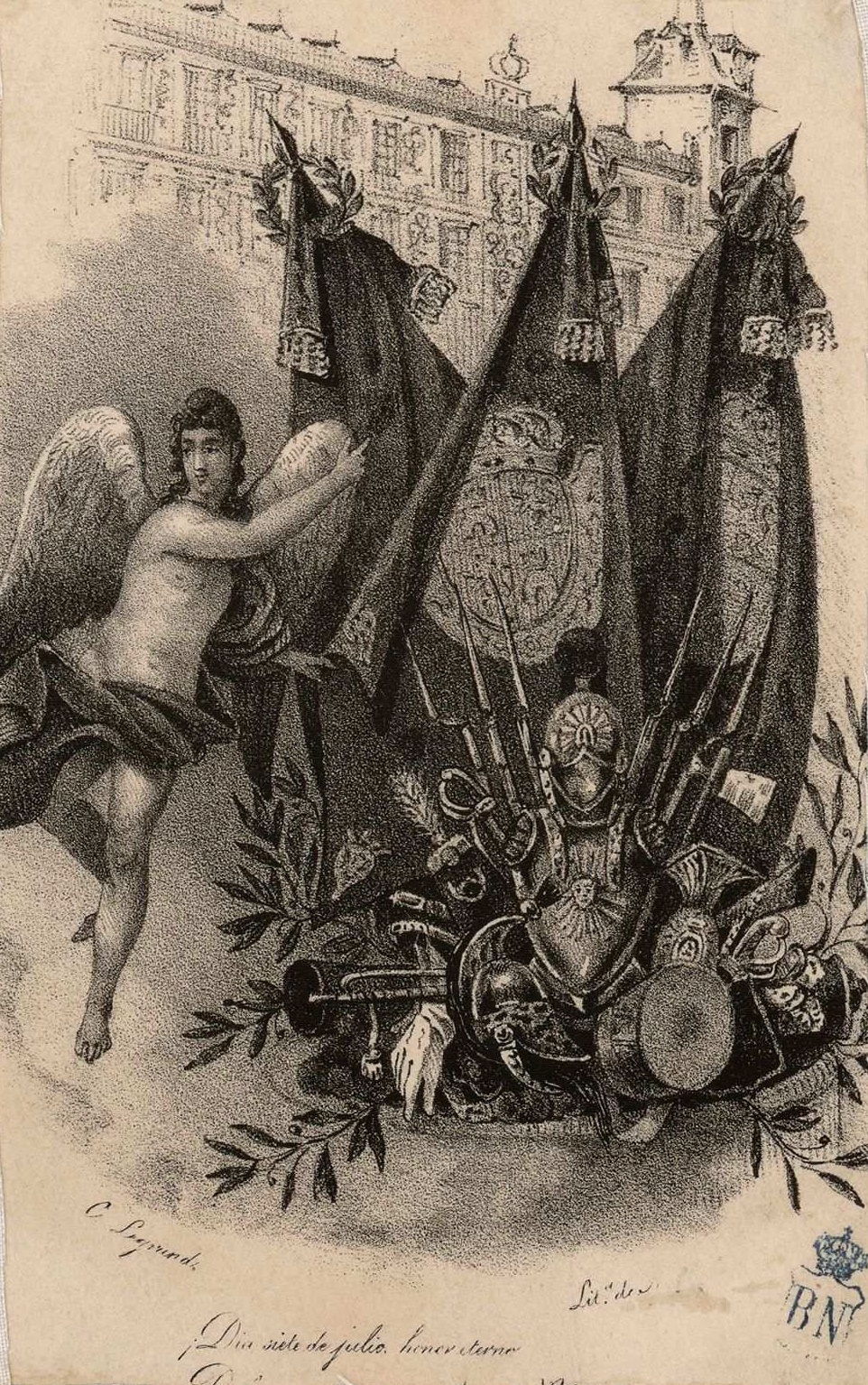
Luis Carlos Legrand, Alegoría del 7 de julio ("July 7th Allegory", lithograph).

In July 1822, an attempted coup d'état took place following the model of the Vinuesa conspiracy from the previous year. This was the most serious attempt at an absolutist coup, marking a turning point in the Liberal Triennium. The Royal Guard rose up, with the connivance of the king himself, who was on the verge of "joining the insurgents to lead the counter-revolution." The king considered it with the government of Francisco Martínez de la Rosa, whose members spent most of their time at the royal palace as virtual prisoners—orders had been prepared for their imprisonment—but Martínez de la Rosa advised against it, as the risks were too high.

On July 1, four battalions of the Royal Guard left their garrisons in the capital and concentrated near El Pardo, while the other two battalions watched over the royal palace. Early on the morning of July 7, they advanced toward Madrid. The National Militia, groups of civilians armed by the municipality, and the "Sacred Battalion," led by General Evaristo San Miguel, confronted them in Plaza Mayor. The guards were forced to retreat to Puerta del Sol, where the most intense fighting took place, and then to the royal palace, where they sought refuge before fleeing. The Royal Guard's action gained no popular support. Its members were pursued by the army and the militia. Only a small number managed to join the partidas realistas. After the failure of the coup, "the king acted as if he had nothing to do with what had happened. He congratulated the forces of liberty... and expelled the courtiers most associated with the conspiracy... The ministers who had been held hostage for six days were finally able to return home."

The victory was for the militias and volunteers who managed to defeat the royal guards: "July 7 became a heroic day for the memory of liberalism, through the creation of a narrative according to which the people of Madrid had defeated absolutism and saved the Constitution."

As highlighted by Juan Francisco Fuentes, "The failure of the coup on July 7, 1822, marked a turning point in the history of the Liberal Triennium: after this day, power shifted from the moderates to the exalted liberals." The moderate liberals were completely discredited due to the ambiguous stance they, or at least the anilleros (the moderate faction), had maintained during the attempted absolutist coup. As a result, the king was forced to appoint a new cabinet on August 5, consisting of exalted liberals, with General Evaristo San Miguel, one of the heroes of July 7 and a participant in the Riego pronunciamiento, as the central figure. He took charge of the Secretariat of State. The failed coup also had other consequences: "The enemies of liberalism took note of the incapacity of Spanish absolutism to overthrow the constitutional regime on its own... This analysis of the coup's failure meant that, from then on, nearly all the pressure on the regime came from abroad, where liberalism had old enemies."

=== The civil war of 1822-1823: The "regency of Urgell" ===
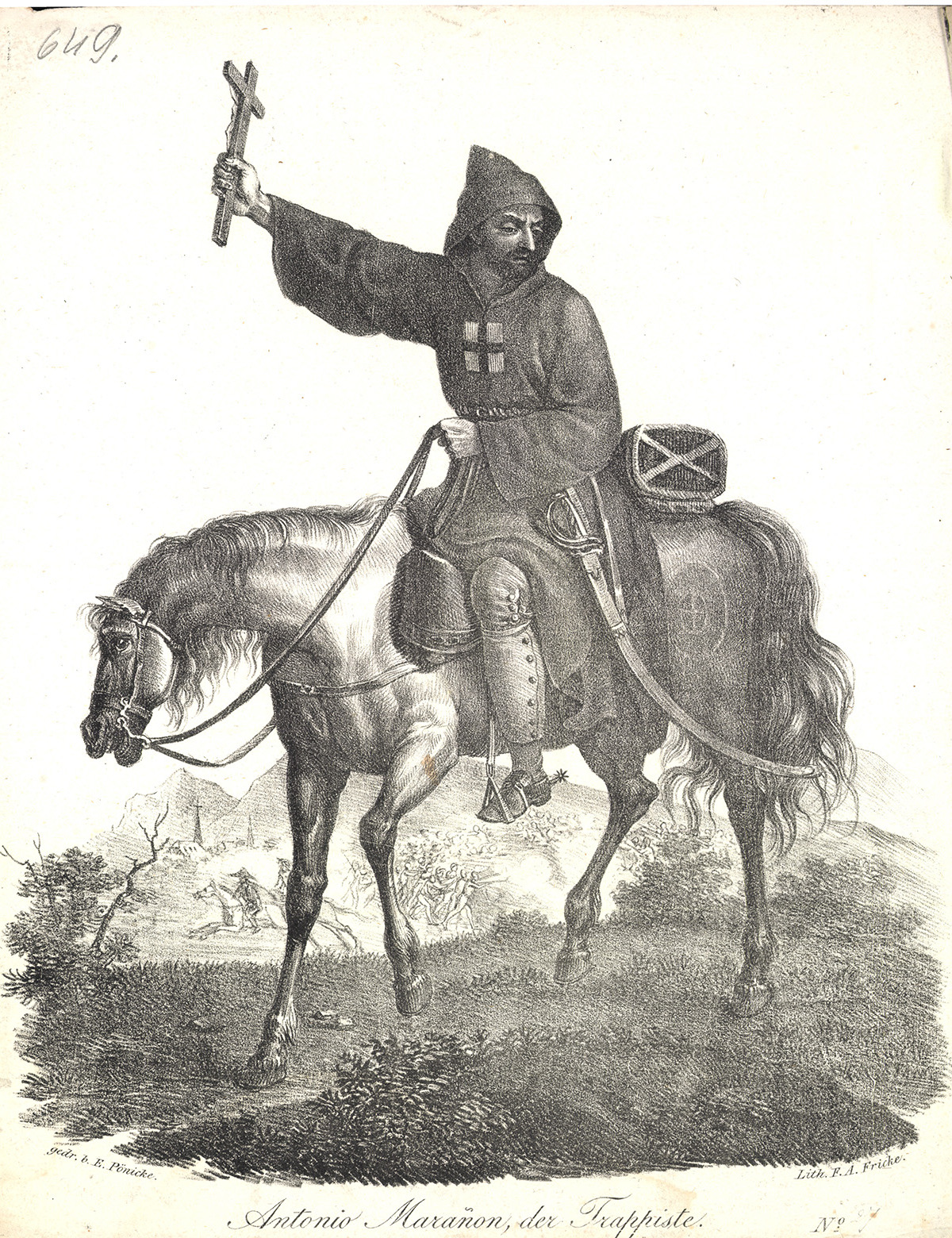
Antonio Marañón, known as " El Trapense ", lithograph by Friedrich August Fricke (1784-1858). He was one of the most famous leaders of the partidas realistas. According to the afrancesado Sebastián Miñano, his extravagant attire helped exalt the people in his favor, as he was seen as a man inspired by God, comparable to those spoken of in the Scriptures.

Starting in the spring of 1822, the royalist uprising, organized from exile and supported in Spain by a dense counter-revolutionary network, with the king at its helm, spread in such a way that "during the summer and autumn in Catalonia, the Basque Country, and Navarre, a true civil war was waged in which it was impossible to stay neutral, and both sides paid the price: reprisals, requisitions, war contributions, looting, etc." The royalists managed to form an army that numbered between 25,000 and 30,000 men.

The event that definitively sparked the civil war was the capture of the La Seu d'Urgell fortress on June 21 by the leaders of the partidas realistas, Romagosa, and El Trapense. The following day, the Provisional Superior Junta of Catalonia was established there, focusing its efforts on creating a regular army and establishing an administration in the royalist-occupied areas of interior Catalonia. A month and a half later, on August 15, the so-called "Urgel Regency" was formed, "established at the request of the people" and "wishing to liberate the Nation and its King from the cruel situation they found themselves in." The regency was formed by the Marquis of Mataflorida, the Baron of Eroles, and Jaume Creus i Martí, Archbishop of Tarragona. The justification for the regency was based on the royalists' belief that the king was "captive" and "kidnapped" by the liberals, just as he had been by Napoleon during the War of Independence.

Following the formation of the Regency of Urgell, the royalists consolidated their control over significant areas in the northeast and north of Spain, establishing their own institutions to administer these territories. Meanwhile, King Ferdinand VII maintained secret correspondence with the courts of various European monarchs—including the Tsar of Russia—who approved of the formation of the regency and offered their assistance.

The government and the Cortes adopted a series of military measures to deal with the royalist rebellion, such as declaring a state of war in Catalonia on July 23. These measures proved effective, and during the autumn and winter of 1822-1823, after a tough six-month campaign, the constitutional armies, led by one of the generals, the former guerrilla fighter Espoz y Mina, turned the tide and forced the royalists in Catalonia, Navarre, and the Basque Country—about 12,000 men—to flee to France, and those in Galicia, Old Castile, León, and Extremadura—about 2,000 men—to flee to Portugal. The regency itself was forced to abandon Urgell, which had been besieged by Espoz y Mina's army since October, after the fall of Cervera the previous month, and cross the border.

After the multiple failures of the royalists — the attempted coup of June 1822, the armed uprising of the partidas realistas, and the political attempt by the Regency of Urgell — it became clear that the only remaining option for them was foreign military intervention, as affirmed by Count of Villèle, the head of the French government who had already provided considerable support to the partidas, thus taking the first step toward approving the involvement of the French army through the so-called "Expedition to Spain."

=== End of the revolution: Expedition to Spain ===
The Congress of Verona, convened by the Quadruple Alliance — which had de facto become the Quintuple Alliance after the incorporation of the Kingdom of France in 1818 — and held between October 20 and December 14, 1822, specifically addressed the dangers posed by the Spanish revolution to monarchic Europe. The staunchest advocates for military intervention in Spain to end the constitutional regime were Tsar Alexander I of Russia and King Louis XVIII of France, the latter seeking to restore international prestige to the Bourbon Restoration regime. For his part, Austrian Chancellor Metternich proposed sending "formal notes" to the government of Madrid urging it to moderate its positions, and, in the absence of a satisfactory response, to break diplomatic relations with the Spanish state.

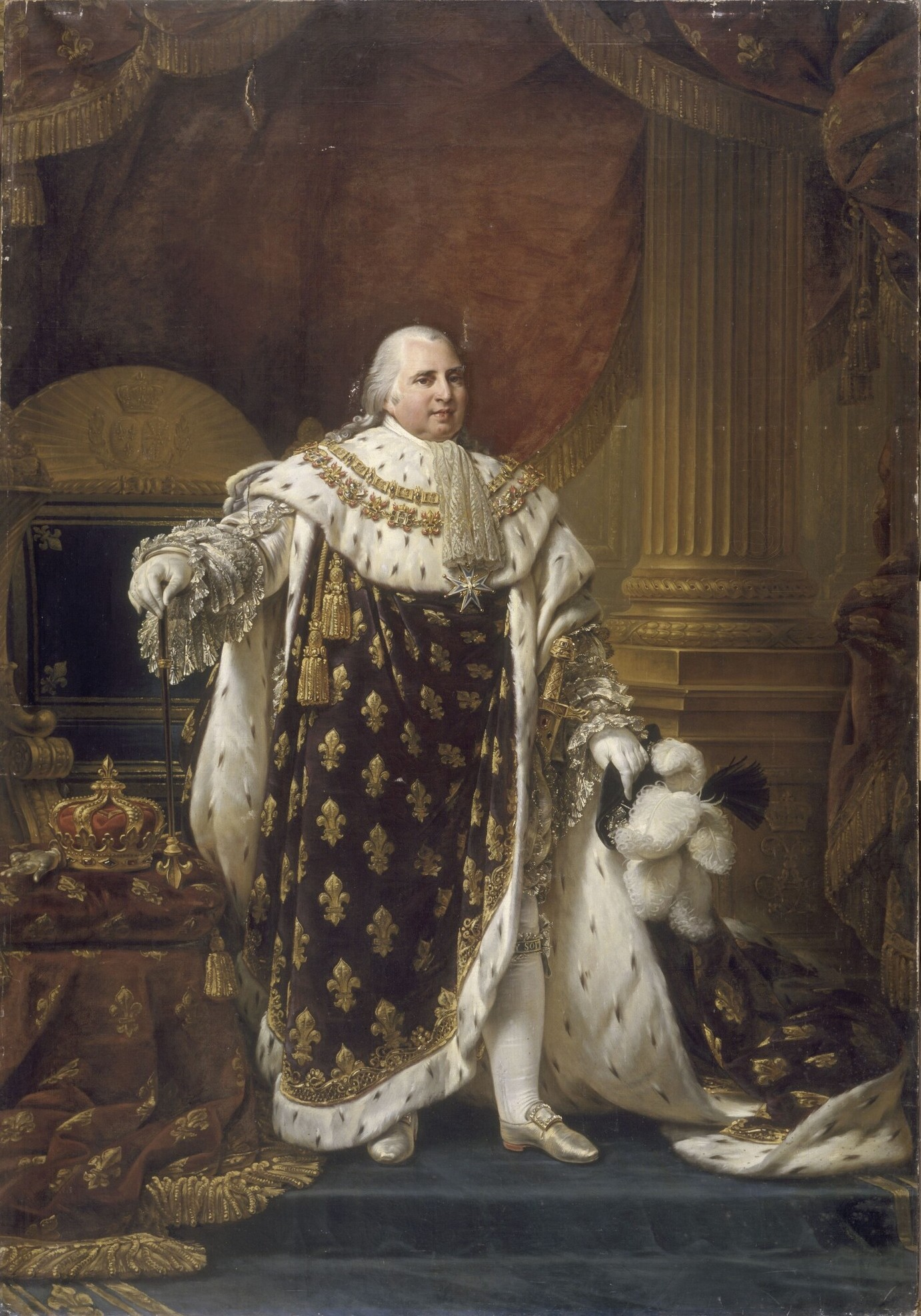
King Louis XVIII of France and his government decided to invade Spain in order to bring down the constitutional regime. Since the discovery in 1935 that the "Secret Treaty of Verona" was a forgery, it has been shown that the Spanish expedition was neither decided at the Congress of Verona nor carried out in the name of the Holy Alliance.

The diplomatic notes were received in Madrid between late 1821 and early 1822 — the French note concluded with the threat of invasion in case "the noble Spanish nation does not find a remedy to its ills by itself, ills whose nature so worries the governments of Europe that it forces them to take always painful precautions." — and were categorically rejected by the strongman of the Spanish government, Evaristo San Miguel, Secretary of the State Bureau, who received support from the Cortes, public opinion, and even the king. San Miguel responded: "The Spanish nation will never recognize in any power the right to intervene or interfere in its affairs." As a result, the ambassadors of the "northern powers" (Austria, Prussia, and Russia) left Madrid; shortly thereafter, on January 26, the French ambassador did the same. The only remaining ambassador in Madrid was the British one, whose government had not sent any notes and had withdrawn from the Congress of Verona. Spain thus found itself isolated internationally, awaiting the form that the threat would take and uncertain about the stance of the United Kingdom.

At the Congress of Verona, Austria, Prussia, and Russia committed to supporting France if it decided to intervene in Spain, but only in three eventualities:

- If Spain directly attacked France or attempted to do so through revolutionary propaganda.
- If the King of Spain was deposed from the throne, or if his life or the life of his family was in danger.
- If a change occurred that could affect the succession rights in the Spanish royal family.

Although none of these conditions were met, France invaded Spain in April 1823. Since the discovery in 1935 that the supposed secret protocol signed by Russia, Prussia, Austria, and France was a forgery, it has been demonstrated that the Expedition to Spain was not decided at the Congress of Verona nor in the name of the Holy Alliance. The invasion of Spain was decided by French King Louis XVIII and his government — especially after François-René de Chateaubriand took charge of foreign policy on December 28, 1822, with the goal of restoring France's status as a great military power — with more or less explicit support or neutrality from the other powers of the Quintuple Alliance.

In his opening speech before the Parliament on January 28, 1823, Louis XVIII informed them of the failure of diplomatic approaches with Spain, which he considered concluded — two days prior, the French ambassador had left Madrid; the Spanish ambassador in Paris did the same after learning of the speech — and then solemnly announced his decision to invade Spain. It was in this declaration that the name under which the French expeditionary force in Spain, under the command of the Duke of Angoulême, became known: "the Hundred Thousand Sons of Saint Louis."

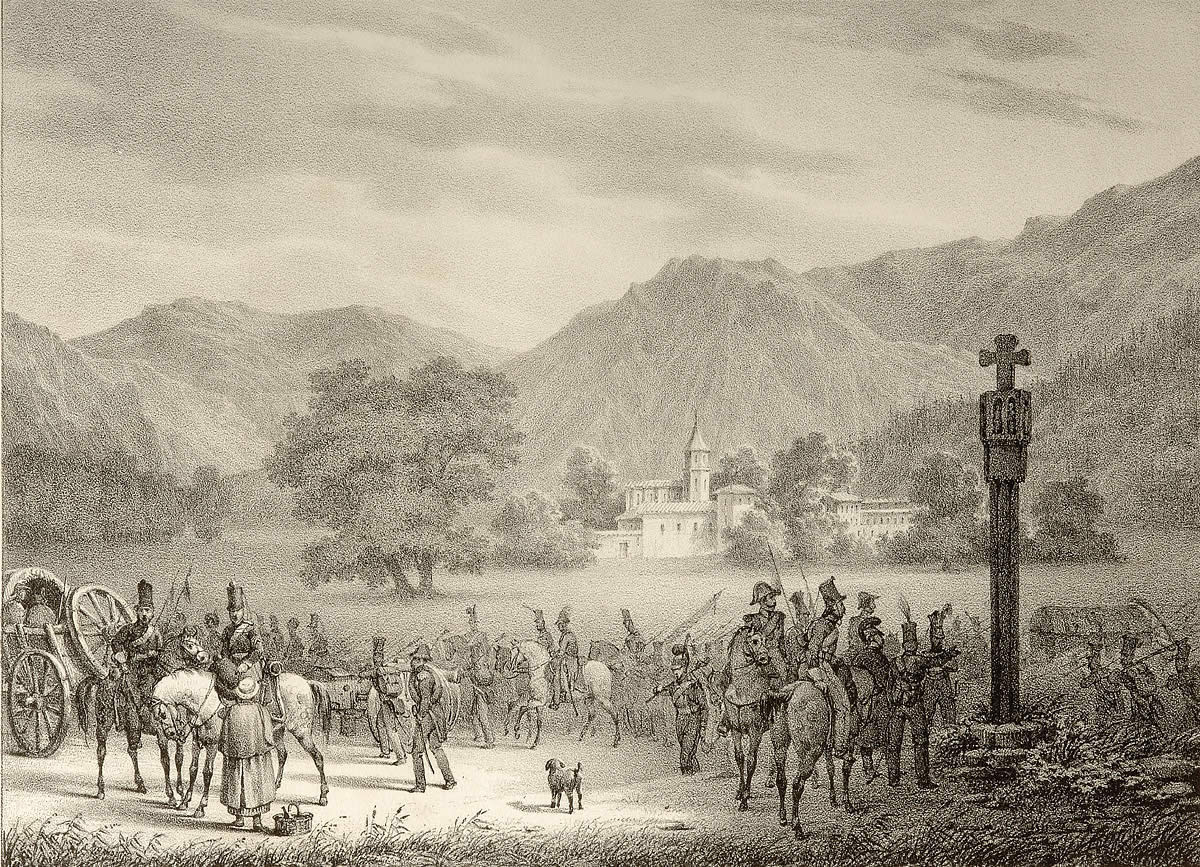
Plaine de Roncevaux (1823), lithograph by Victor Adam depicting the passage of the hundred thousand sons of Saint Louis through the commune of Roncevaux (Navarre).

On April 7, 1823, the so-called "Army of Spain" began crossing the Spanish border without a prior declaration of war. Initially numbering between 80,000 and 90,000 men, their number rose to around 120,000 by the end of the campaign, with some having already participated in Napoleon's invasion of 1808. They were supported by royalist Spanish troops that had organized in France before the invasion — between 12,500 and 35,000 men according to different sources. As they advanced, the royalist troops were joined by the partidas realistas that had survived the constitutional army's offensive. Historian Juan Francisco Fuentes highlights the paradoxical situation of the members of the partidas, who, fifteen years earlier, had fought against the French in the War of Independence.

The government led by Evaristo San Miguel organized the Spanish forces into four armies. However, only the second army — the largest, with 20,000 men, and the best prepared — commanded by General Espoz y Mina, faced the invaders, in Catalonia. The other three generals — the Count of La Bisbal, commanding the Reserve Army of New Castile; Pablo Morillo, leading the forces in Galicia and Asturias; Francisco Ballesteros, commanding the troops in Navarre, Aragon, and the Mediterranean — did not offer significant resistance. As a result, the French army was able to advance south without much difficulty and entered Madrid on May 13 — although the speed of the campaign may be misleading, as the French had advanced without occupying most of the strongholds.

Except for a few cities that demonstrated considerable resistance — such as La Coruña, which resisted until late August, Pamplona and San Sebastián, which only surrendered in September, or Barcelona, Tarragona, Cartagena, and Alicante, which continued the fight until November, more than a month after the defeat of the constitutional regime — there was no popular resistance to the invasion, nor the formation of anti-French guerrillas as during the War of Independence. On the contrary, the partidas realistas joined the invader's forces. The situation was quite different: the king was not a prisoner of the French — on the contrary, many portrayed him as a hostage of the liberals — and the Catholic religion was not in danger.

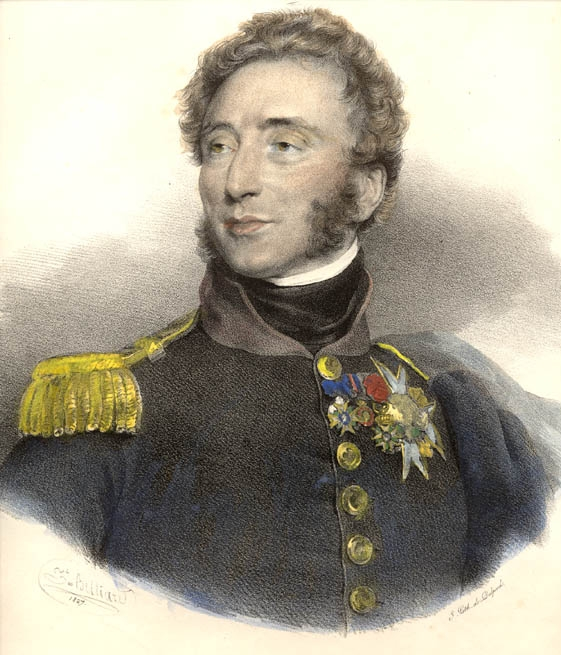
Louis de France, Duc d'Angoulême, Commander-in-Chief of the Spanish Army.

When the Duke of Angoulême entered Madrid on May 23, greeted by the bells of all the churches in the capital, he appointed a regency led by the Duke del Infantado.

As the French troops advanced southward, Spanish royalists unleashed a general explosion of violence against the liberals, carrying out numerous atrocities with a spirit of revenge and without submission to any norms or authority. The Duke of Angoulême felt obligated to intervene and issued the Andújar Ordinance on August 8, 1823, which withdrew the ability of royalist authorities to carry out persecutions and arrests for political reasons, reserving that power for the French authorities. The royalist rejection was immediate, leading to an insurrection of the absolutist Spain against the French, which was successful. On August 26, the Duke of Angoulême modified the decree—effectively rendering it almost void—under pressure from the French government, concerned about the ongoing crisis and the opposition of the Holy Alliance to the ordinance. After the modification, the violence resumed with great vigor, to the point where historian Josep Fontana described it as "white terror."

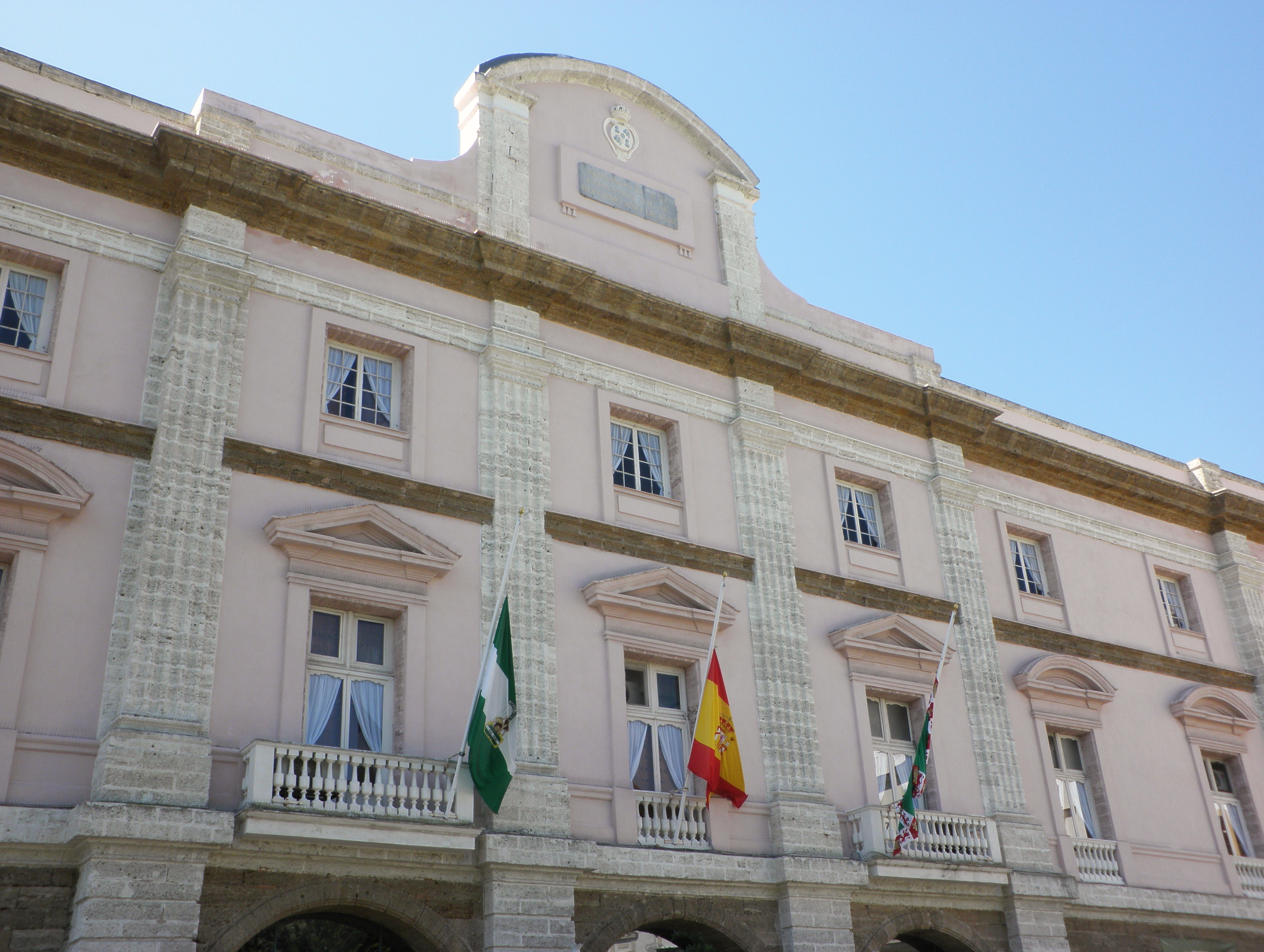
The Aduana Palace in Cadiz, the king's residence during the French attack of 1823. From the terraced roof of the building, Ferdinand VII entertained himself by flying kites and observing the attackers with spy-glasses. Whether the use of kites was simply a diversion or a means of communicating with the invaders by sign remains to be seen. What is known is that the monarch used various means to keep in touch with the royalists and the French, and asked them to "rescue" him.

On June 9, the French troops crossed the Despeñaperros, defeating the forces of General Plasencia, thereby clearing the path to Seville—where the government, the Cortès, the king, and his family were located at that time. Faced with the threat of invasion, the Cortès and the government—two governments, one headed by Evaristo San Miguel and the other by Álvaro Flórez Estrada—had abandoned Madrid on March 20—three weeks before the first French soldier crossed the border—and headed south, establishing themselves in Seville on April 10, where they forcibly led Ferdinand VII and the royal family. The king's only desire was, in reality, to be in the presence of the "foreigners."

The Cortès reopened their sessions on April 23, and the king signed the declaration of war against France the following day. Shortly after, the cabinet led by San Miguel resigned, which should have led to the formation of a new executive led by Flórez Estrada. However, opposition from a large group of deputies triggered a new political crisis, which was resolved only the following month with the formation of a new government, with the main figure being the radical José María Calatrava, who did not hold the position of Secretary of the Bureau of State, as was customary at the time, but that of Grace and Justice.

On June 11, the Cortès decided to move to Cadiz, taking the king and his family there once again against their will. Ferdinand VII resisted more tenaciously to avoid the journey, so the Cortès, claiming he was suffering from a "temporary lethargy," and in accordance with the Constitution, declared him unfit to exercise his functions and appointed a regency—composed of Cayetano Valdés y Flores, Gabriel Císcar, and Gaspar de Vigodet—which would hold the powers of the Crown during their stay in Cadiz. The response of the royalist regency installed in Madrid by the Duke of Angoulême was to issue a decree on June 23 that accused all deputies who participated in the deliberations to declare the king unfit for lèse-majesté. This was the "offense" for which the general and liberal hero Rafael del Riego was hanged. As soon as they arrived in Cadiz on June 15, the constitutional regency ended, and the king regained his powers.

As it had been thirteen years earlier, Cadiz was besieged by the French army. On the night of August 30–31, the French troops took the Louis Fort (Trocadéro), and twenty days later, they captured the Sancti Petri Fort, making any resistance impossible. This time, Cadiz did not benefit from British naval support as it had in 1810.

=== "Liberation" of Ferdinand VII and restoration of absolute monarchy ===
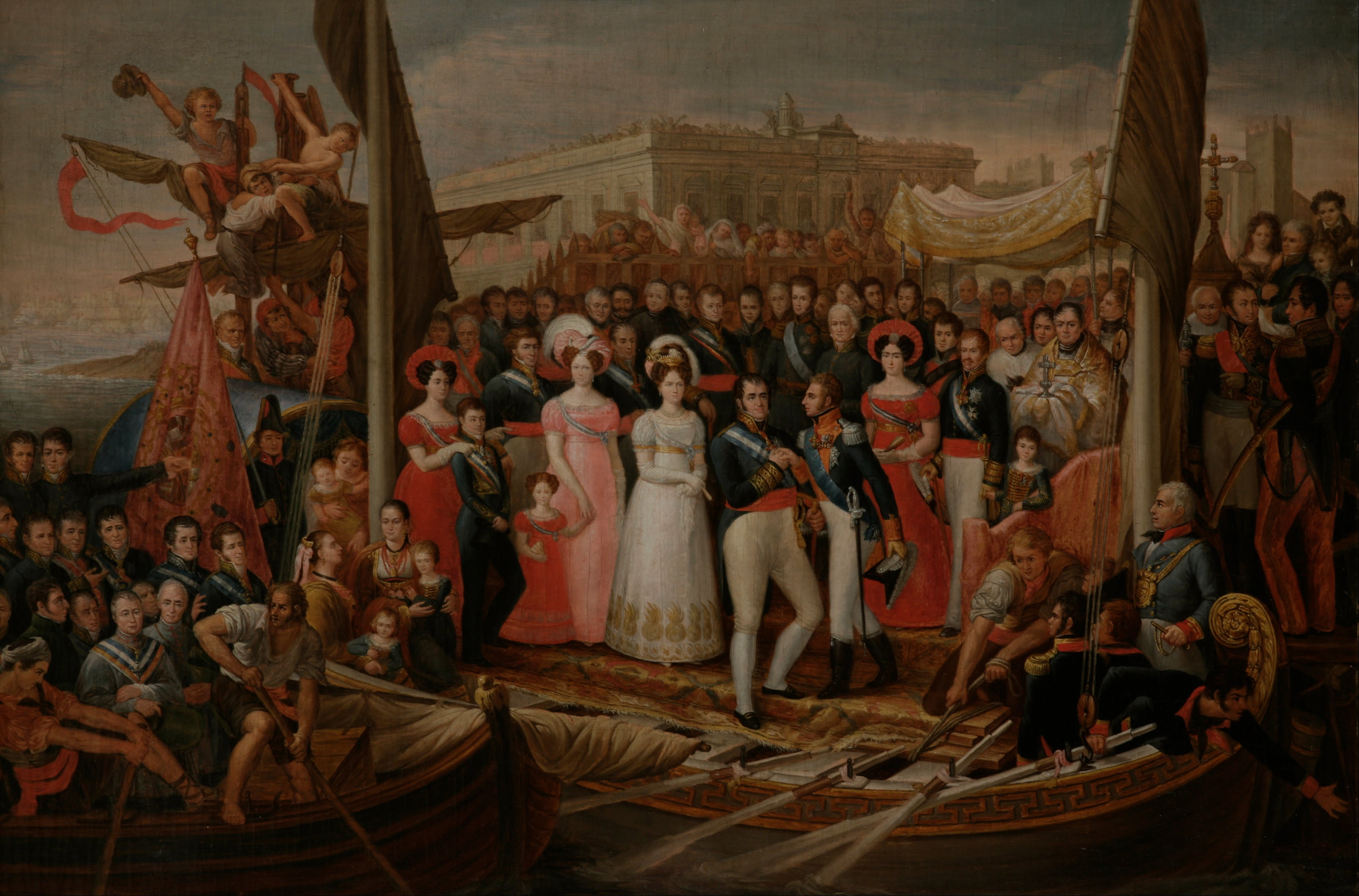
Painting by José Aparicio depicting the landing of Ferdinand VII at El Puerto de Santa María after being "freed" from his "captivity" in Cadiz. He is received by the Duc d'Angoulême, commander of the French Spanish Army, and the Duc del Infantado, president of the absolutist regency appointed by the French.

On September 30, 1823, after nearly four months of siege, the liberal government decided, with the approval of the Cortès, to let King Ferdinand VII depart. The next day, he met with the Duke of Angoulême and the Duke del Infantado, president of the absolutist regency appointed by the French, in El Puerto de Santa María, on the opposite side of the Bay of Cadiz. Many of the liberals in Cadiz fled to England via Gibraltar, believing that the king would not keep his promise, made just before being "liberated," to promote reconciliation and forgiveness between the two sides, with "a general, complete, and absolute forgetfulness of everything that had happened, without any exception." They were not wrong.

As soon as Ferdinand regained his freedom, and against the advice of the Duke of Angoulême, who urged him to "extend the amnesty as much as possible" and avoid a return to a situation similar to that of 1820—whom he simply responded to with "Long live the absolute king!"—he issued a decree upon disembarking that annulled all the legislation of the Liberal Triennium. In doing so, he also broke the promise he had made to the King of France and the Tsar of Russia that he would not "reign again under the regime known as absolute."

Later, Ferdinand VII wrote recalling this October 1st, when he arrived at El Puerto de Santa María:

Happy day for me, for the royal family, and for the entire nation; since from that moment we regained our long-desired and rightful freedom, after three years, six months, and twenty days of the most ignominious slavery, which a handful of conspirators and obscure and ambitious soldiers managed to impose on me, who, not even knowing how to write their names, made themselves the regenerators of Spain, imposing on us the force of laws that suited them best to achieve their sinister goals and make their fortunes, destroying the nation.

On November 30, 1823, the Duke of Angoulême gave his last general order from Oiartzun, near the border, in which he considered the campaign a complete success and praised his troops for their zeal. The next day, he crossed the border at Bidassoa. The Spanish campaign, which lasted seven and a half months, ended as an authentic triumph for Ferdinand VII.

=== Ominous Decade ===
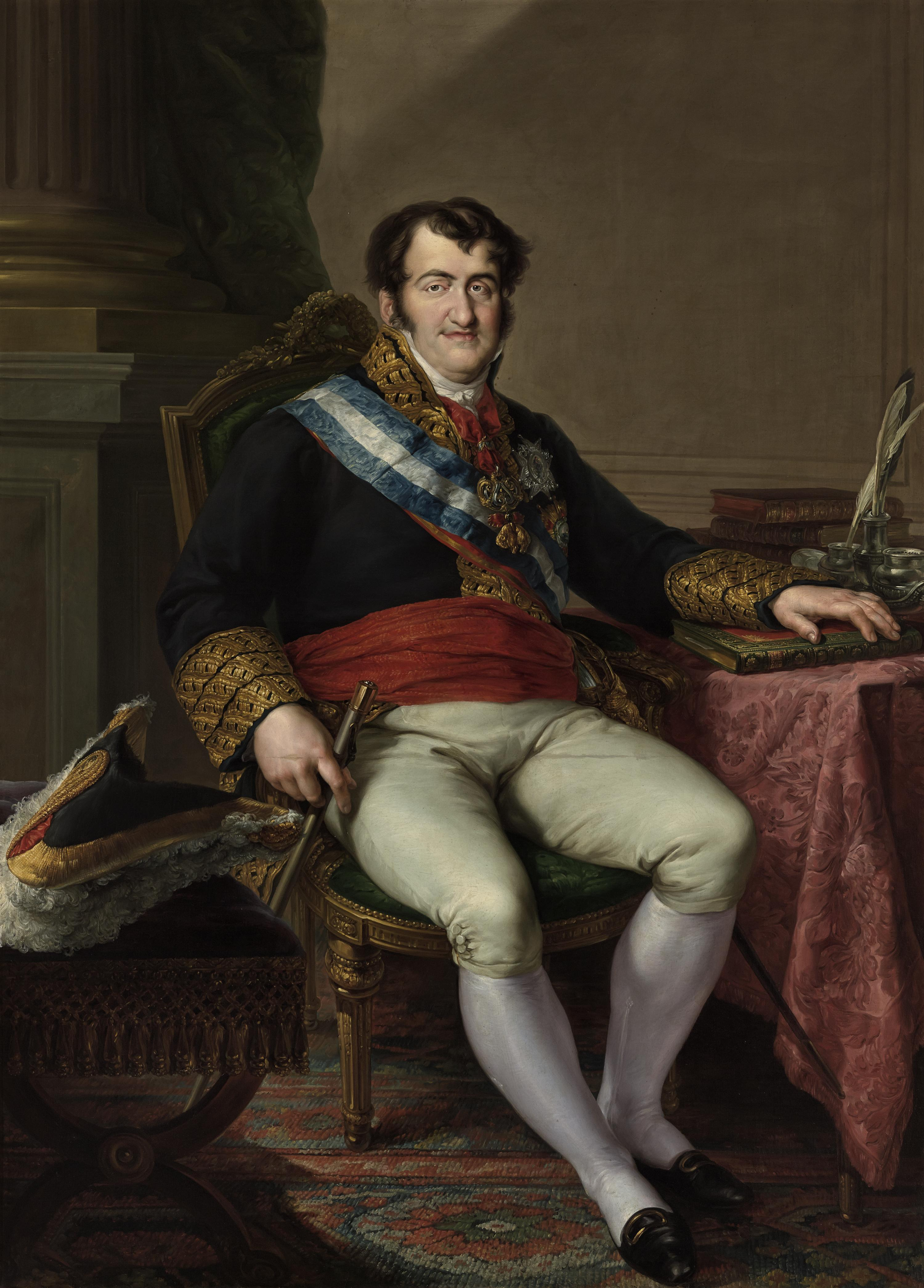
Portrait of Ferdinand VII by the painter Vicente López, commissioned by the Banque de Saint-Charles in 1828. Historian Emilio La Parra López describes him as follows: "Wearing the habit of a captain general, with all the important decorations and the scepter in his right hand, a posture unusual in the Spanish history of royal portraits, with his left hand resting on books placed on a table. On the edge of one of the books are the words: 'R. CÉDULA DEL BANCO DE S. FERNANDO'. The obesity and receding hairline are quite obvious. This painting, says J.L. Díez, offers 'without doubt the most sincere image of the monarch, bloated, in his middle age'. It is also that of the reformist king, concerned with developing the kingdom's economy".

The term "Ominous Decade" (Década Ominosa) was coined by the liberals who suffered repression and exile during these ten years. The French Hispanist Jean-Philippe Luis added nuance to this view of the period: "On the one hand, the abominable decade is not just the end of the world but participates in the construction of the liberal state and society. On the other hand, the regime is both tyrannical and, whether voluntarily or involuntarily, reformist."

=== Repression and exile ===
As soon as Ferdinand VII regained his absolute powers on October 1, contrary to his promise of pardon and the advice of the Duke of Angoulême, repression was fierce and arbitrary, far harsher than in 1814 during the Coup d'état of May 1814, partly because in 1823 there were many more liberals than nine years before. During the following years, French troops remaining in Spain due to the agreement between the two monarchies intervened on numerous occasions to protect the liberal-leaning population from the harassment and repressive excesses of absolutism.

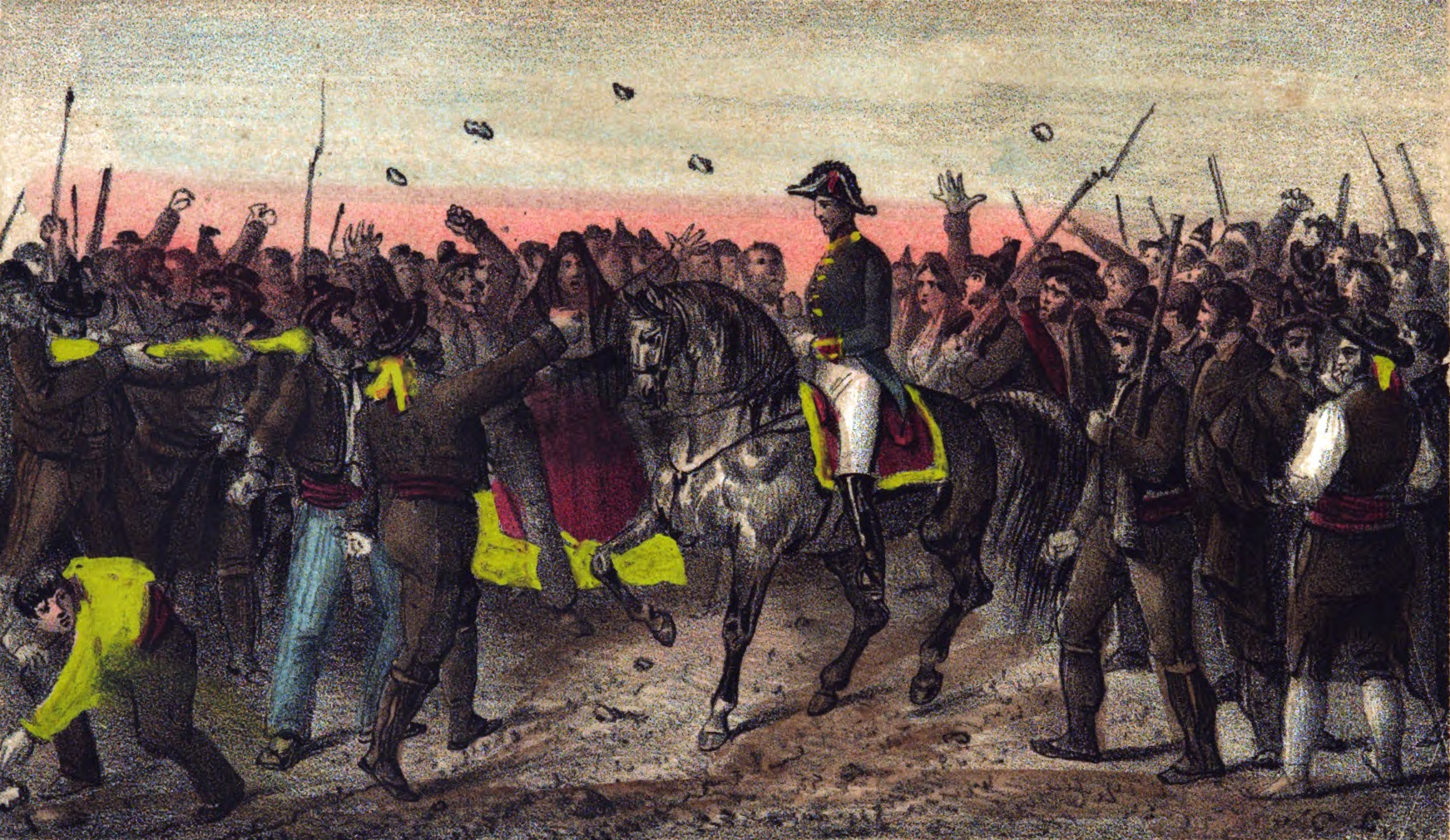
Lithograph by J. Donon showing Rafael del Riego being led by the royalists to La Caroline prison.

The symbol of the harsh repression led by Ferdinand VII was the hanging of General Rafael de Riego, an icon of liberalism, on the Plaza de la Cebada in Madrid on November 7, 1823. Another example was Juan Martín Díez, El Empecinado ("The Obstinate"), a guerrilla leader and hero of the War of Independence, who spent over twenty years in prison under inhumane conditions before being hanged on August 19, 1825, after a sham trial.

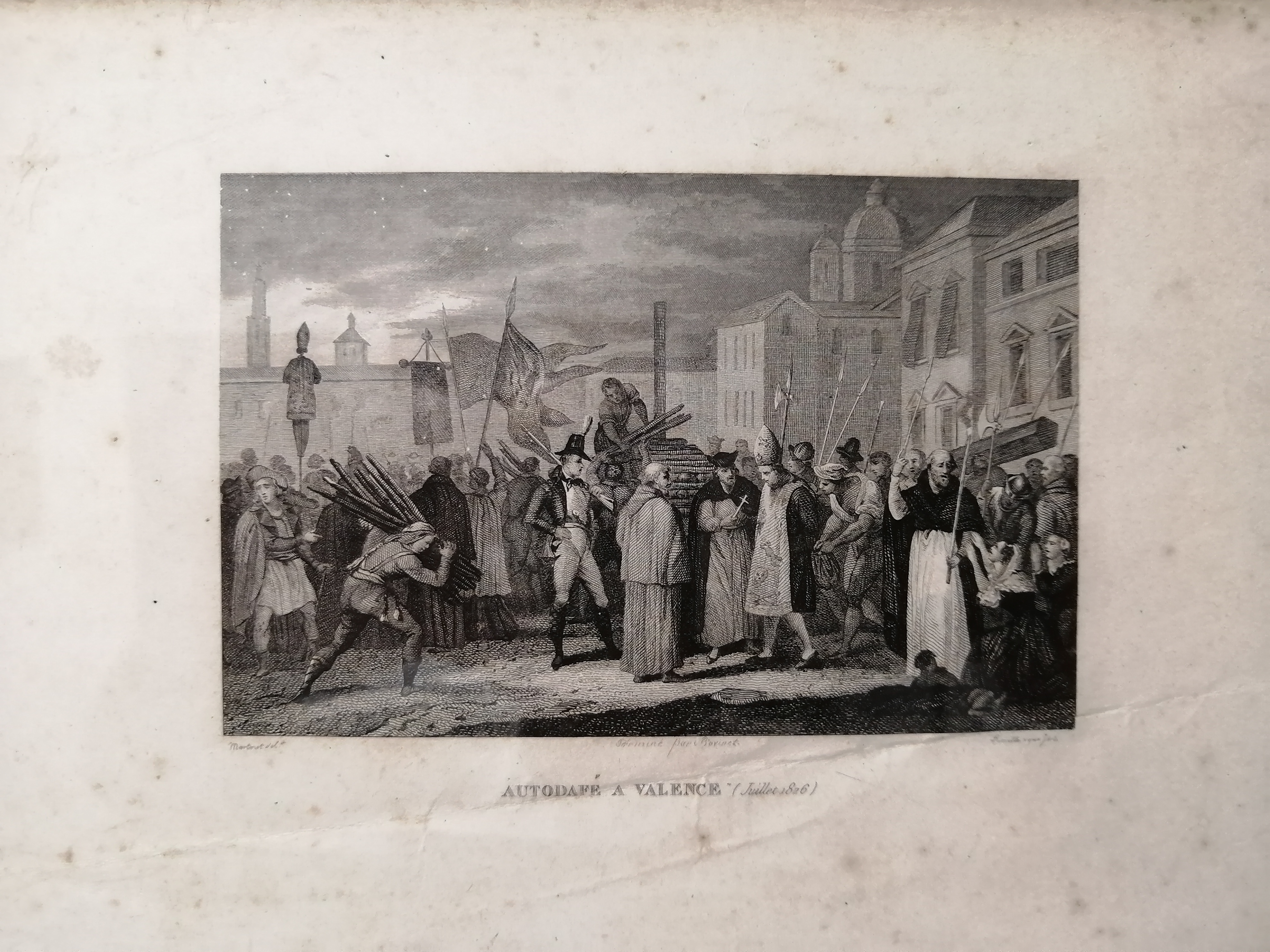
Engraving entitled Autodafé à Valence (July 1826), supposedly depicting the execution of Cayetano Ripoll for heresy, but in reality representing an Inquisition autodafé (the accused wears a sambenito and is about to be burned at the stake). Ripoll was hanged by sentence of the Junta de la Fe of the diocese of Valencia, and his corpse was only symbolically "burned". Ripoll's execution took place in Valencia Market Square (the buildings shown in the engraving, probably invented, do not correspond to the actual location).

A month before the detention of El Empecinado, death penalties and prison sentences were decreed for those who had declared themselves supporters of the 1812 Constitution. Commissions were set up to purge the state administration or the army of those who had supported the constitutional regime or opposed the absolutist regime shortly after the restoration of absolutism. Likewise, some dioceses created Junta de la Fe (Councils of the Faith), which assumed part of the functions and methods of the Inquisition, which was not restored despite pressure from "ultra-absolutists." One of their victims was the deist schoolteacher from Valencia, Cayetano Ripoll, accused of being a "stubborn heretic" (hereje contumaz) and executed on July 31, 1826. To centralize repression and avoid "popular excesses," the General Police Superintendency was created in January 1824 — the first police force in Spain — which also assumed the ideological control previously exercised by the Inquisition.

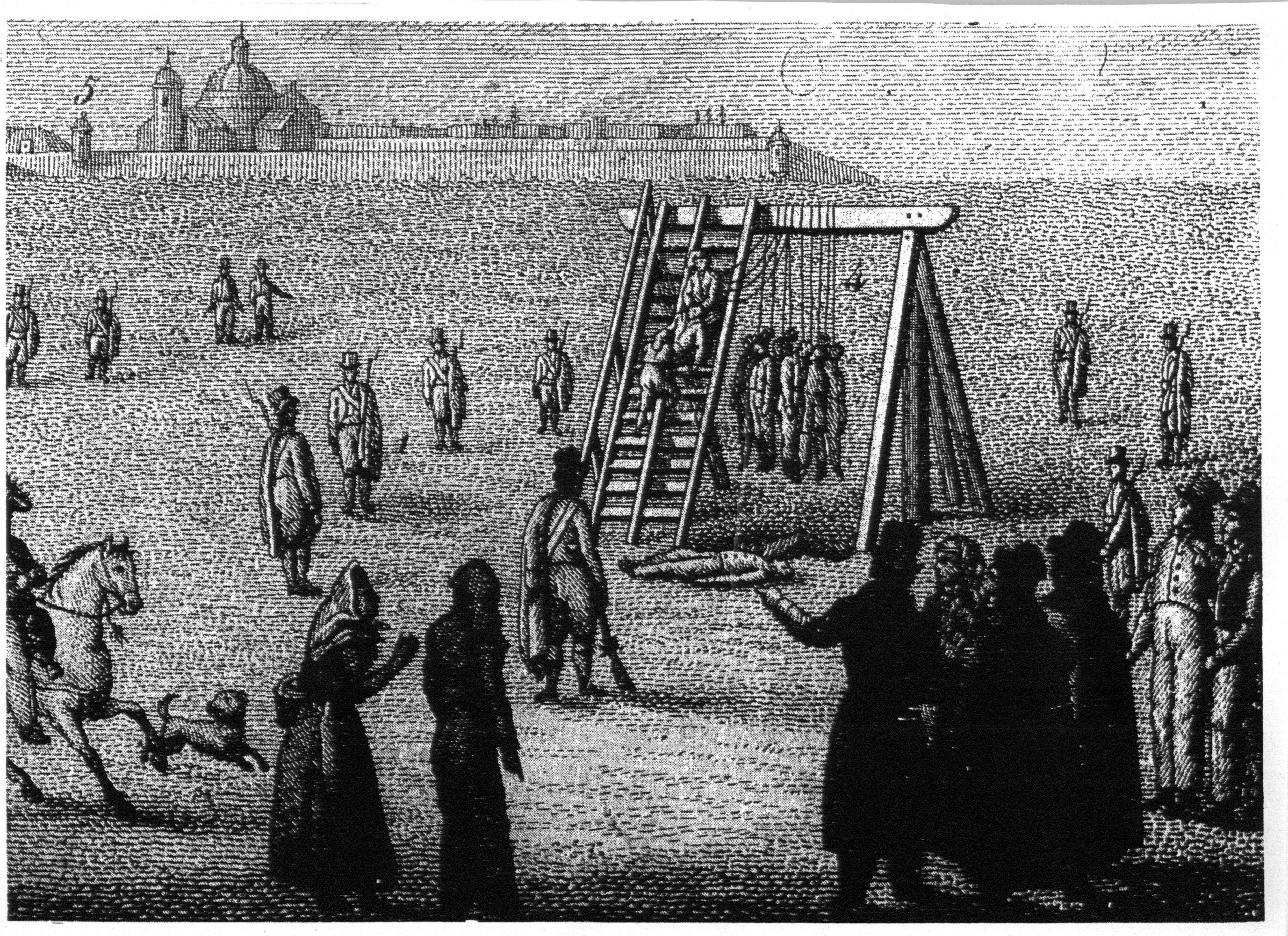
Repression of the liberals near the Barcelona citadel, guarded by the Mossos d'Esquadra under the supervision of the Count of Spain, governor of this stronghold at the end of the liberal triennium.

The liberal clergy — or even those who simply did not oppose the constitutional regime — were another victim of the repression, which was primarily carried out by the Church itself.

In December 1823, the king ordered his government the "Dissolution of the army and the formation of a new one." Thus, hundreds of officers were subjected to purging trials, with many resulting in their expulsion from the Army, either temporarily or permanently.

The pressure from European powers forced Ferdinand VII to decree a "general grace and pardon" on May 11, 1824, but this amnesty included so many exceptions that, in practice, it condemned all those included in them, so much so that it ultimately had the opposite effect of what was intended. Many people who thought they were safe fled Spain after its promulgation.

As in 1814, the harsh repression against liberals caused the exile of a large number of them. This was the largest political exile in Restoration Europe. Estimates indicate between 15,000 and 20,000 exiles, with the main destinations being France — which took in about 77% —, England — about 11% —, Gibraltar, and Portugal. Many liberals had been taken to France as prisoners of war — many of them soldiers and non-commissioned officers of the Spanish army and members of the National Militia. England welcomed most of those who had held public office in the constitutional state — deputies, state secretaries, political leaders, etc. — as well as army officers and leaders, journalists, intellectuals, and other prominent members of the ilustrada and liberal middle class, making it the political and cultural epicenter of the exile. This is where conspiracies aimed at overthrowing absolutism were organized, while in France, the more popular sectors were found.

Furthermore, the Spanish exile, along with the Neapolitan, Piedmontese, and Portuguese exiles (though to a lesser extent), "was central to the development of a European liberal police. Paradoxically, the defeat of southern constitutionalism in 1821–1823 strengthened European liberalism in the following decades. Exile facilitated contact between liberals from several countries and the formation of international networks that kept political engagement alive with those suffering reprisals." Thus, a "liberal internationalism" emerged, in which the exiled liberals and their experience of the Liberal Triennium played a leading role.

Liberal exiles were able to begin returning to Spain after the approval of an initial amnesty in October 1832, while Ferdinand VII was still alive, adopted on the initiative of his wife, Maria Christina of Bourbon-Sicily, and the "reformist" absolutists, but it included many exceptions, so the definitive return only occurred after a second amnesty law was approved in October 1833, a month after the king's death. It was expanded in February 1834 after the arrival of the moderate liberal Francisco Martínez de la Rosa to the government, who had already led the government during the Liberal Triennium.

=== Division among absolutists: "reformists" vs. "ultras" (or "Apostolics") ===
Thus, just as during the Liberal Triennium (1820–1823) there was a split among liberals between "moderates" and "exalted," during the Abominable Decade it was the absolutists who divided between "reformists" — those in favor of "softening" absolutism following the warnings of the Quadruple Alliance and the France of the Restoration — and the "ultras" [...], who defended the complete restoration of absolutism, including the reinstatement of the Inquisition, which Ferdinand VII, under pressure from European powers, had not re-established after its abolition by the liberals during the Triennium. The ultras — also called "apostolics," "ultra-royalists," or "ultra-absolutists" — had in the king's brother, Charles of Bourbon — Carlos de Borbón, heir to the throne since Ferdinand VII, after three marriages, failed to have descendants — their main protector, which is why they were sometimes called "Carlists." The most serious conflict they were involved in was the War of the Aggrieved, which took place between March and October 1827, with its epicenter in Catalonia.

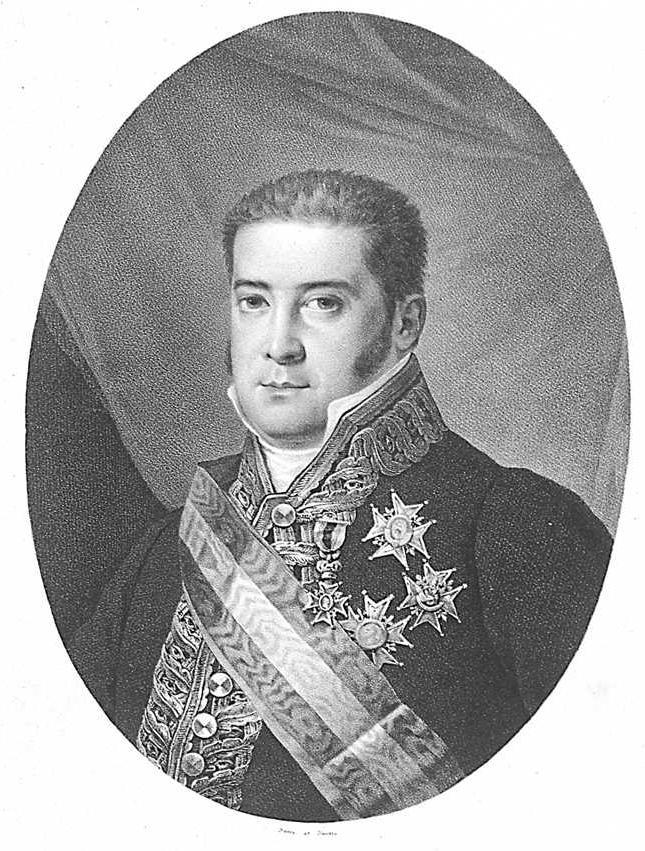
Luis López Ballesteros, Secretary of State for the Budget between 1823 and 1832, was one of the most notable "reformist" absolutists.

Three decisions made by the "reformist" government appointed by Ferdinand VII, supported by him, led to a split among the absolutists between the "reformists" and the "ultras." The first decision, which was the most radically rejected by the ultras as they considered it an unacceptable concession to liberalism, was the non-restoration of the Inquisition abolished by the liberals in March 1820. The "ultras" viewed the Holy Office as the most important symbol of the Ancient Regime in Spain. The second decision was the creation in January 1824 of the General Police Superintendency, which would become a key institution in the repressive policy of the absolutist regime and assume many of the functions previously performed by the Inquisition, such as book censorship. The ultras rejected this measure for the same reason, believing that public order should be controlled by the Holy Office and the Royalist Volunteers, not by a centralized state body of suspicious "French origin." The third measure was the granting of a very limited amnesty ("grace and general pardon") to the liberals, which was also rejected by the ultras, despite the fact that it contained so many exceptions that it was practically ineffective.

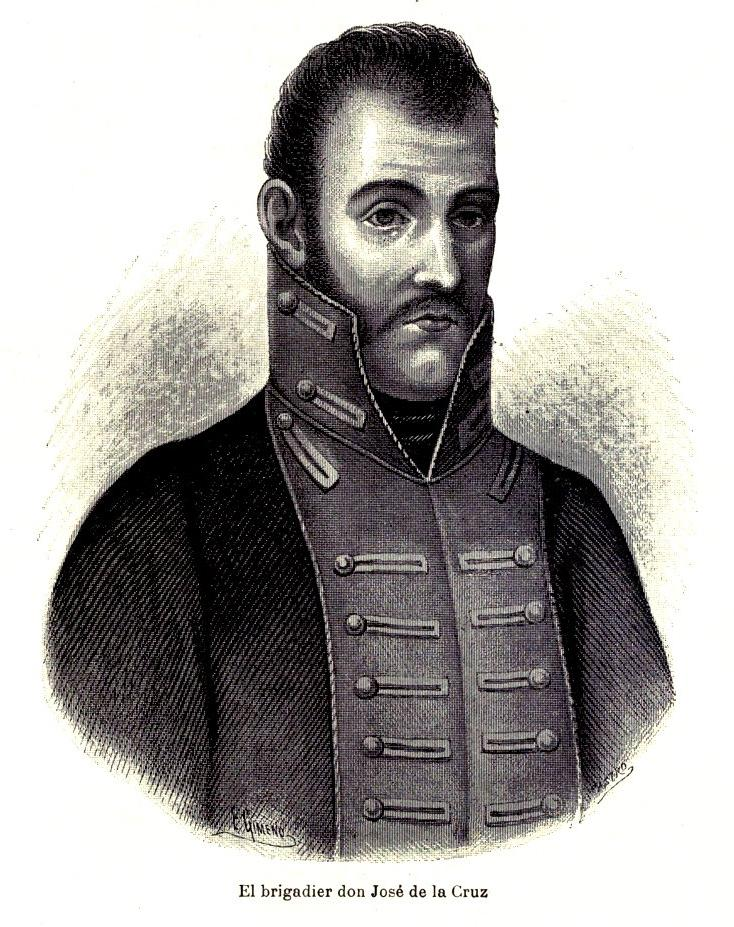
General José de la Cruz, Secretary of State for War. The approval of the regulations by the Royalist Volunteers, some of whom refused to apply them, eventually led to his dismissal and replacement by the ultra-rightist José Aymerich.

There was a fourth reason for the split. The agreement signed in February 1824 with the French monarchy under which 45,000 men from the 1823 expeditionary force remained in Spain, deployed in 48 strongholds (Madrid, Cádiz, La Coruña, Badajoz, Cartagena, Vitoria, and various Catalan towns, including Barcelona, along the Cantabrian coast and the Pyrenean border), each with a French commander responsible for public order. The economic cost was borne by the Spanish Treasury, according to a convention renewed annually until 1828. Ultras frequently proclaimed, "Out with the French!" A fifth reason was the approval, at the end of February 1824, by the Secretary of State for War, General José de la Cruz, of a new regulation for the Royalist Volunteers, which was poorly received by them and to which they refused to comply. This regulation excluded day laborers and those who could not provide for themselves and their families for the duration of their service. On August 26, General De la Cruz was dismissed, accused of conniving with the landing at Tarifa of the liberal Colonel Francisco Valdés Arriola, who held the position between August 3 and 19, after which 36 participants were executed. De la Cruz was replaced by the ultra José Aymerich. In 1826, a new regulation for the Royalist Volunteers was approved, accepting day laborers and instructing authorities to prioritize Royalist Volunteers in the granting of local jobs.

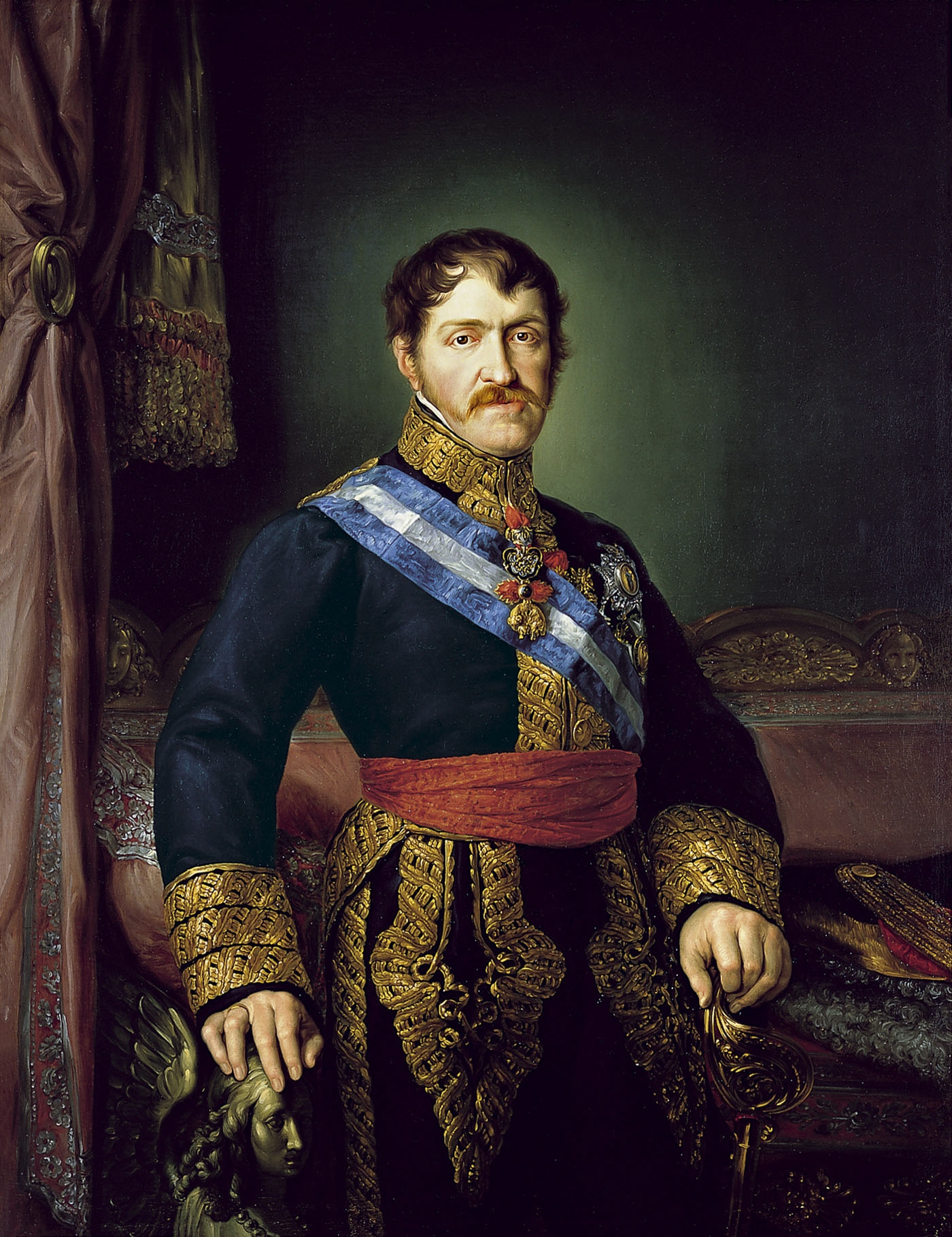
Portrait of Charles de Bourbon, the king's brother and heir to the throne, by Vicente López Portaña. The name "Charles V" was sometimes acclaimed by the ultras, whose ideas he shared.

Once it was confirmed that the Inquisition would not be restored and that the May 1824 amnesty was approved, although extremely limited, the ultras began to organize and conspire, with firm support from the Spanish Church and the Royalist Volunteers, who had become the armed wing of ultra-royalism. With the support of the infant Charles, his wife Marie Françoise of Braganza, and his sister-in-law, Princess of Beira, their rooms in the palace became the center of the "Apostolic Party."

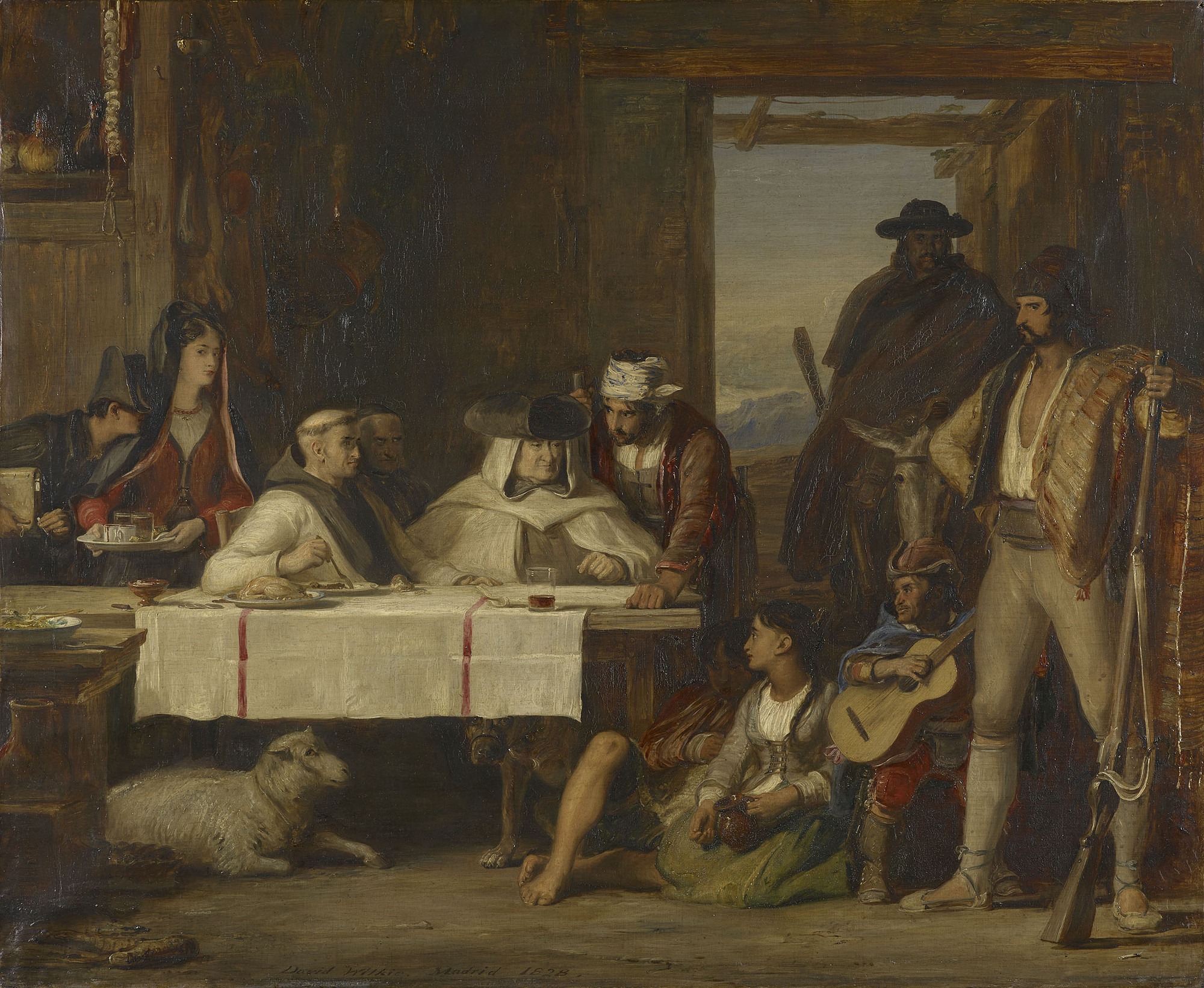
The Spanish Posada by David Wilkie depicting the meeting in an inn of the command of a guerrilla group, including a religious brother. Wilkie lived in Spain between October 1827 and June 1828.

The first ultra insurrection took place a few days after the publication of the May 1824 amnesty decree. It was led by the Aragonese Royalist leader Joaquín Capapé. In Teruel, he gathered several dozen disgruntled officers and soldiers, but they were captured by troops sent by the provincial governor. Capapé was sentenced to six years of exile in Puerto Rico, where he arrived in late September 1827 and died shortly thereafter, on December 25 of the same year. In September 1824, the second attempt took place in La Mancha and was also led by Royalist officers discontented with the treatment they received after supporting the French expedition that had toppled the constitutional regime. Its leader was Manuel Adame de la Pedrada "El Locho," a former leader of the Royalist partisan groups, who had planned to share the lands of a large local landowner with his men. The immediate justification for the revolt was, according to what he declared when questioned by the authorities, that "if the king forgave the blacks [the liberals], we do not forgive them." The trial was eventually interrupted because the prevailing idea was that the conspiracy had been a plot "by the revolutionary [liberal] forces to divide and sow discord starting with the Royal Family." Royalist volunteers had also participated in the conspiracy.

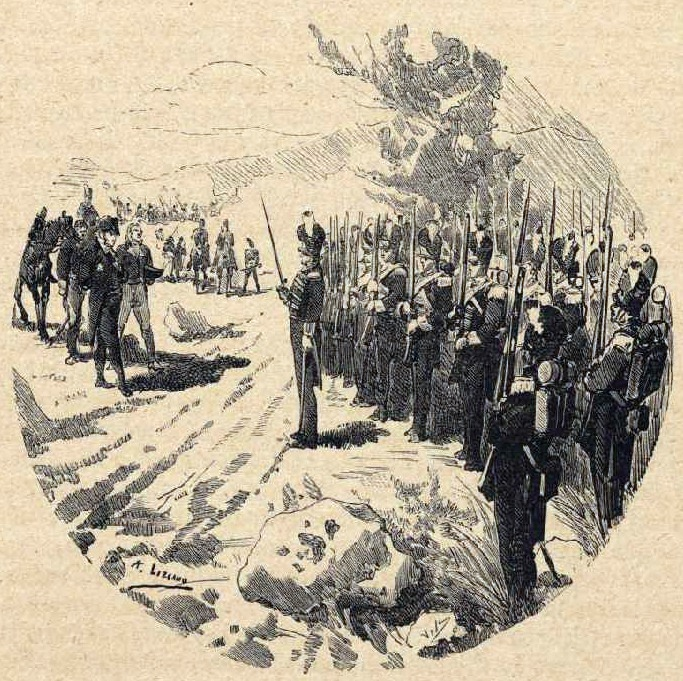
Executions de Bessières by Ángel Lizcano, illustration from Fernando Fernández de Córdoba, Mis memorias íntimas, t. I, Madrid, 1886.

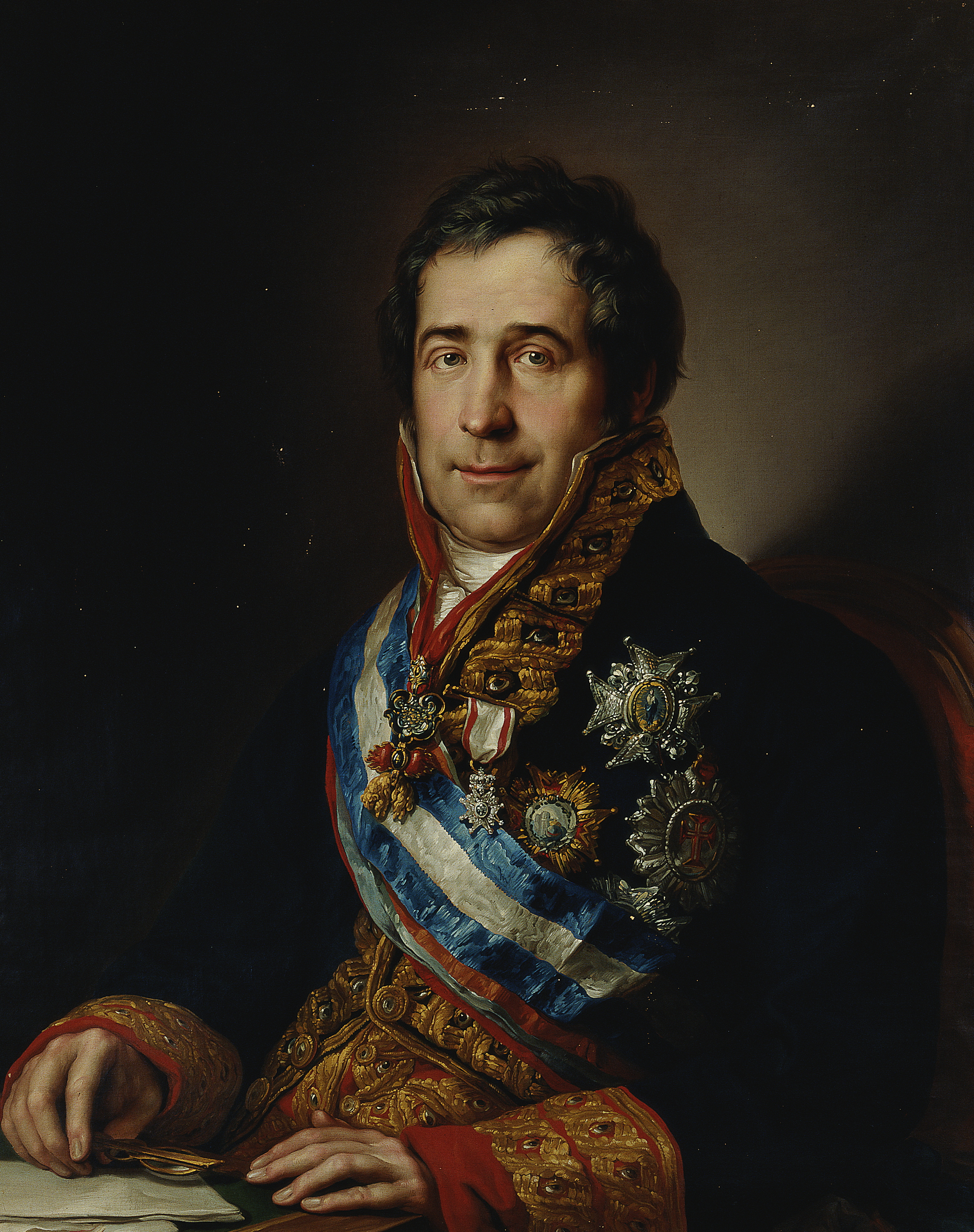
Francisco Tadeo Calomarde, an important representative of the ultra-royalists, was Secretary of State for Grace and Justice between January 1824 and October 1832.

The third insurrectional attempt, the most serious of the three, occurred in August 1825. It was led by the Royalist General Jorge Bessières. He left Madrid early in the morning on August 16, leading a cavalry column to join a group of Royalist Volunteers involved in the conspiracy at Brihuega (province of Guadalajara). Bessières had spread the news that the Cadiz Constitution was about to be restored, and from this position, he intended to take Sigüenza, but the arrival of government troops led by the Count of Spain—3,000 men versus 300 of Bessières—forced him to give up. He allowed his troops to disperse and was captured on the 23rd at Zafrilla. On August 26, by direct order of the king, he was executed by firing squad in Molina de Aragón along with seven officers who had stayed with him. A week earlier, the liberal guerrilla fighter Juan Martín Díez El Empecinado had been executed in Roa. Bessières' conspiracy had connections in the capital, and many involved, including important ultras, some of whom were priests, were detained by the police but were only imprisoned briefly, thanks to the complicity of certain authorities or fears of the government about the possible consequences of a persecution of the ultra or Carlist party.

The most significant ultra-absolutist uprising of the entire decade—and which is considered a "rehearsal" for the First Carlist War—was the so-called "War of the Aggrieved" (Guerra dels Malcontents in Catalan), which mainly took place in Catalonia, although more limited ultra uprisings also occurred in the Basque Country, Valencia, Andalusia, Aragon, and La Mancha. It began in the spring of 1827 with the formation of the first Royalist partisan groups in the Ebre region and reached its peak during the summer. The insurgents, mostly peasants and artisans, managed to mobilize between 20,000 and 30,000 men and occupied most of the former principality. The leaders of the rebellion were former Royalist officers from the "army of the faith" who had fought alongside the French army during the 1823 expedition.

On August 28, they formed a provisional Superior Junta of the government of the Principality in Manresa, presided over by Colonel Agustín Saperes "Caragol," who, in a decree of September 9, emphasized loyalty to King Ferdinand VII. To legitimize the rebellion, the "Malcontents" claimed that their goal was to "support the sovereignty of our beloved King Fernando," whom they said was "kidnapped" by the government, although they also exalted "Charles V," the king's brother and heir to the throne, who shared the ultras' ideology.

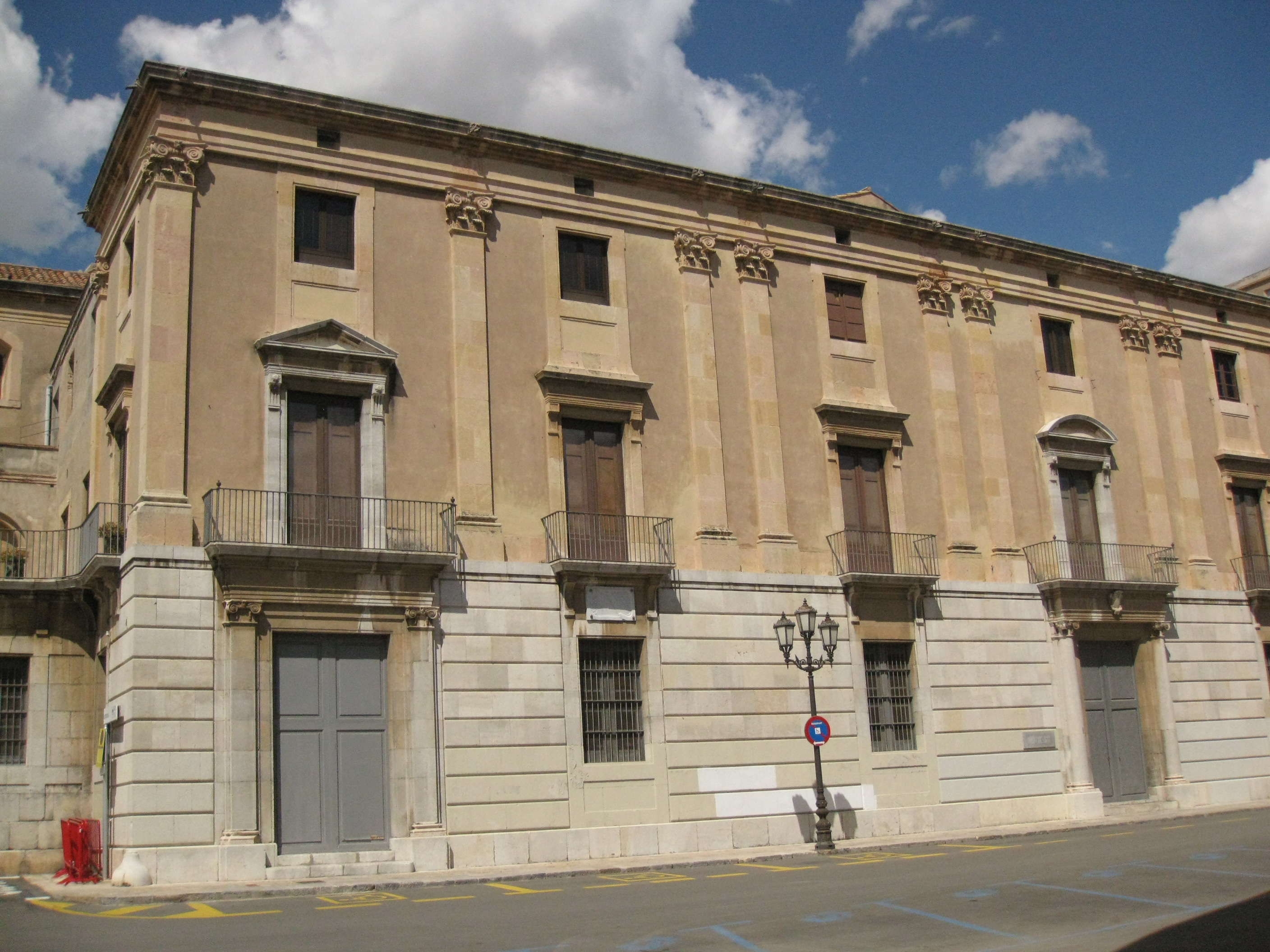
Archiepiscopal palace in Tarragona, where Ferdinand VII signed the manifesto to put an end to the "Malcontents" rebellion.

In response to the scale of the rebellion and its spread outside Catalonia, the government decided to send an army to the region, led by the Count of Spain, a notorious absolutist who was appointed as the new Captain General. A visit by the king to the region was also organized (he arrived from Valencia at the end of September, accompanied by only one minister, the ultra Francisco Tadeo Calomarde) to dispel any doubts about his supposed lack of freedom and to urge the insurgents to lay down their arms. On September 28, a Manifesto by Ferdinand VII was made public from the archiepiscopal palace in Tarragona, in which he declared that the "vain and absurd pretexts with which you have so far attempted to justify your rebellion" were "debunked."

The effect of the manifesto was immediate and caused the surrender or disbandment of a large number of insurgents. A few days later, Manresa, Vic, Olot, and Cervera surrendered without resistance. Although the rebellion continued for a few more months, by mid-October it could be considered as exhausted. Meanwhile, the royal authorities conducted relentless repression against the rebels, with summary executions and the detention of suspects both in Catalonia and the rest of Spain, where the uprising had numerous other supporters. In Catalonia, the repression was led by the Count of Spain, who also extended it to the liberals after the departure of the French troops that had been protecting them. According to Emilio La Parra López, "The Catalans were slow to forget the severity practiced by the Count of Spain in suppressing the insurgents."

Ángel Bahamonde and Jesús A. Martínez highlighted that the failure of the War of the Discontented marked a shift for the royalists, who, feeling deceived by a legitimate king who represented their principles and whom they initially wanted to defend, began to increasingly openly support the alternative embodied by the infant Charles of Bourbon.

=== Failed liberal conspiracies ===
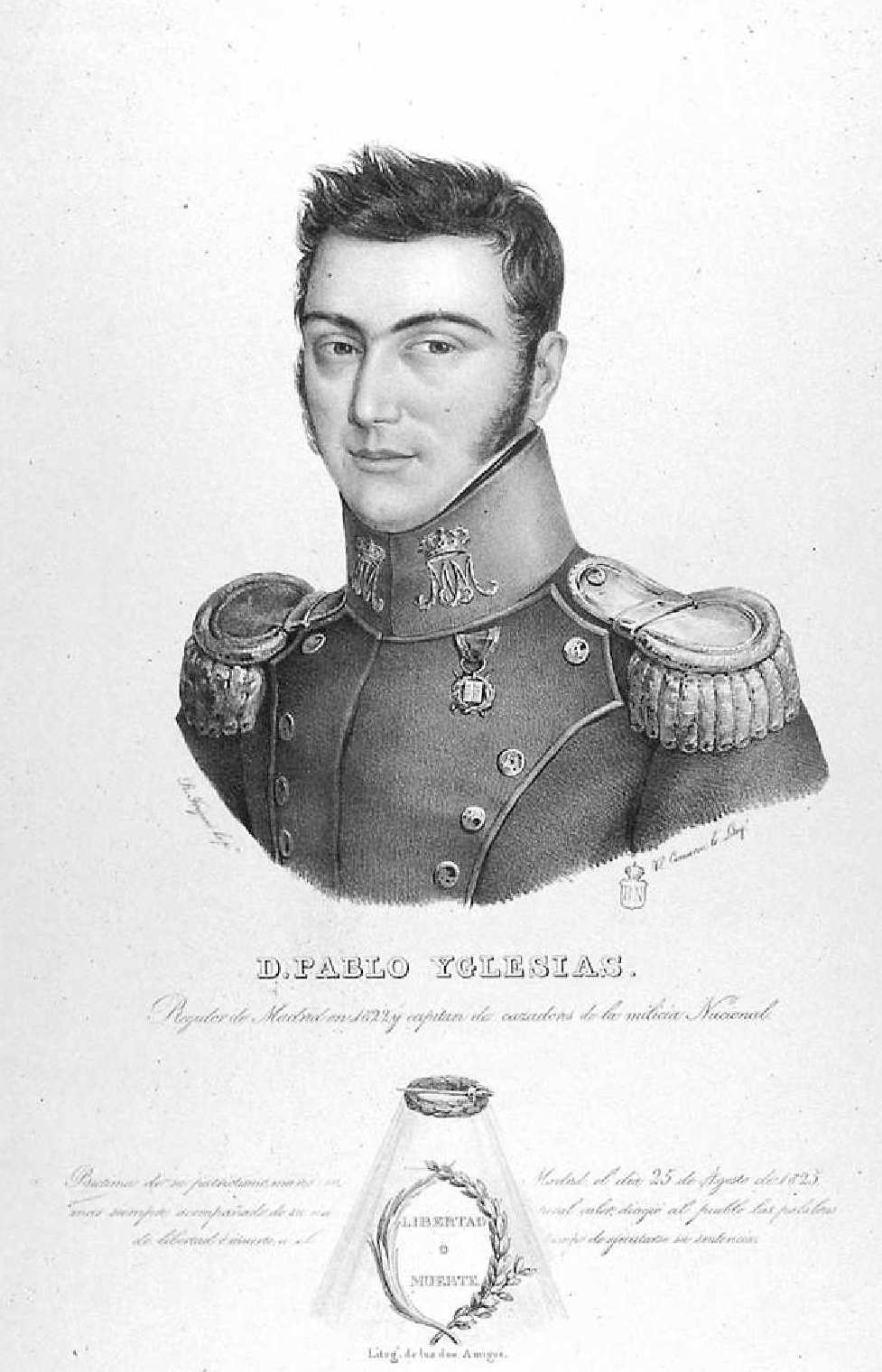
Pablo Iglesias, lithograph by Vicente Camarón.

The liberals were convinced that it was possible to repeat the experience of the Pronunciamiento de Riego, meaning "it would only take a caudillo to step foot on Spanish soil and proclaim the good news of freedom to have the entire people follow him." According to Josep Fontana, "They did not understand that since 1823, terror had done its work effectively, and that the government, incompetent in areas like budgeting, was much more efficient in the arts of surveillance and repression."

The first attempt to realize this "insurrectional liberal utopia" took place on August 3, 1824. It was a pronunciamiento led by the exiled Colonel Francisco Valdés Arriola, who, starting from Gibraltar, took the city of Tarifa and held the position until August 19. Simultaneously, a second group led by Pablo Iglesias González landed in Almería, hoping to receive massive support. Both operations failed because, contrary to the liberals' expectations, they found no support from the population. More than one hundred people were captured—with the help of French troops in the detentions—and were immediately executed. Pablo Iglesias was hanged in Madrid on August 25 of the following year, while Colonel Valdés managed to escape to Tangier with fifty of his men.

The second insurrectional attempt was led by Colonel Antonio Fernández Bazán and his brother Juan, who organized a landing at Guardamar del Segura in February 1826. They were pursued by the Royalist Volunteers and captured along with their men. All were executed. Antonio Fernández Bazán, severely wounded, was tortured to obtain his confession about the conspiracy plot but was executed on March 4 in Orihuela, suffering from gangrene.

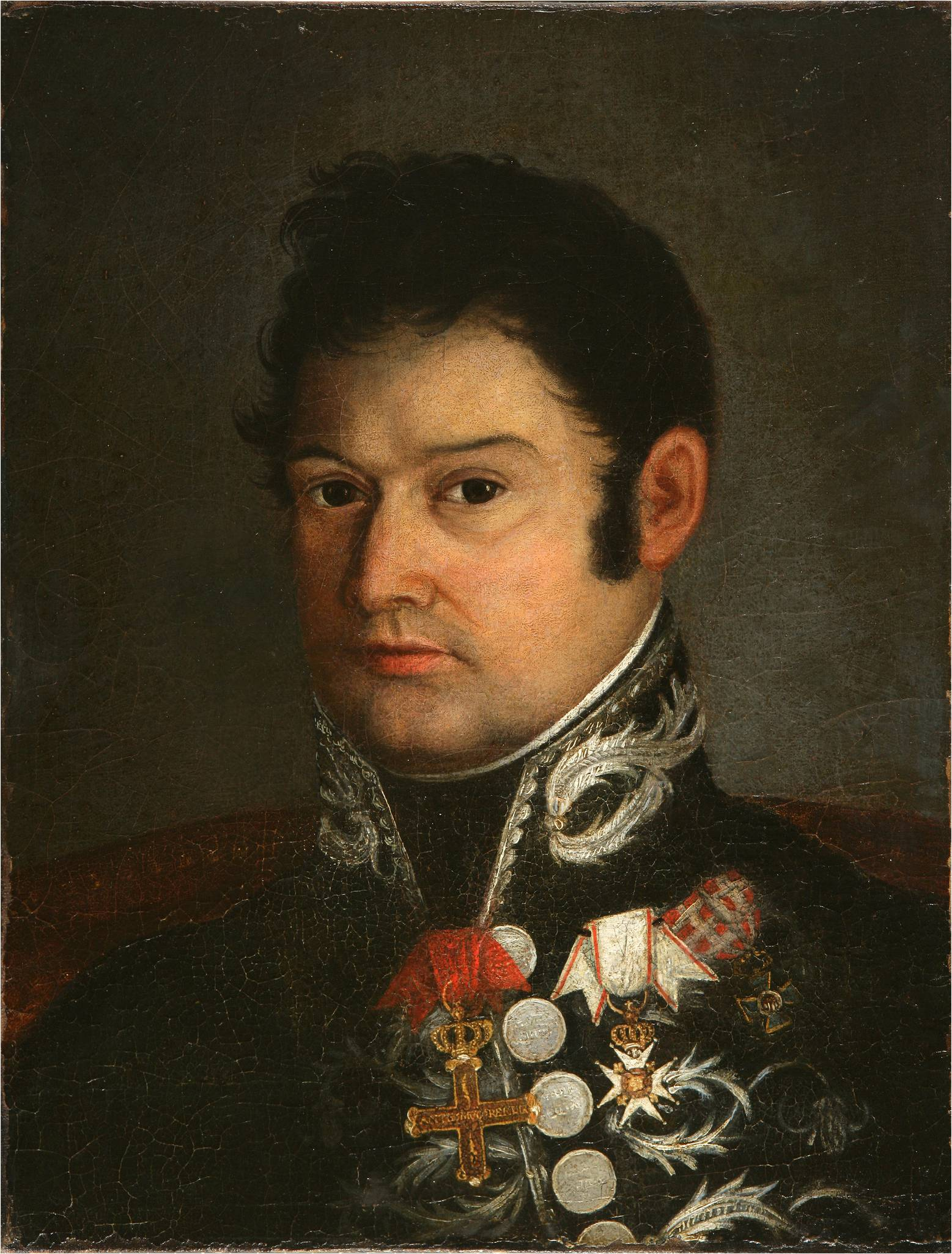
General Francisco Espoz y Mina, who presided over the London Junta in exile and led an attempted invasion of Spain via Bera.

The triumph of the July Revolution of 1830, which ended absolutism in France and paved the way for the constitutional monarchy of King Louis-Philippe's July Monarchy, energized the insurrectionary plans of the Spanish liberals, who hoped to find support from the new French government. However, these hopes were ultimately disappointed: the new "King of the French," as soon as he received Ferdinand VII's recognition, not only provided no support to the liberals but even ordered the dissolution of their gatherings at the French-Spanish border.

On September 22, 1830, an insurrectional junta was formed in Bayonne, which was joined by General Francisco Espoz y Mina, a veteran of the War of Independence. In October and November, it organized several military expeditions into the Pyrenees, but all of them ultimately failed. He led the expedition at Bera, between October 20 and 24. Coinciding with the Bera operation was an attempted invasion through Catalonia, led by Colonel Antonio Baiges, who carried the French and Spanish tricolored flags. All of these attempts failed because they received no support from within the territory and were also hastily executed due to the pressure from the French gendarmerie stationed at the border, which forced them to rush their plans.

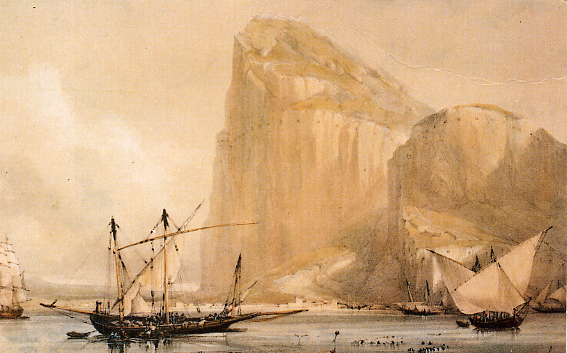
Rock of Gibraltar, circa 1830.

For his part, José María Torrijos, the other leader of the liberal exile alongside Espoz y Mina, continued preparations for an uprising in southern Spain from Gibraltar. Between October 1830 and January 1831, there were two initial attempts, one at Algeciras and the other at La Línea de la Concepción, but both failed. Almost simultaneously, the interior committees loyal to Espoz y Mina, coordinated by a Central Junta in Madrid led by Agustín Marco-Artu, carried out several attempts in the Campo de Gibraltar, the Serranía de Ronda, and the Bay of Cádiz, which also failed.

On February 21, Salvador Manzanares, at the head of about fifty men, took the town of Los Barrios in Cádiz province. Not only did they not receive the promised help from the liberals in the Algeciras and Serranía de Ronda areas, but they were also betrayed. Seven of the survivors managed to flee and return to Gibraltar. Manzanares also managed to escape but was eventually captured in Estepona and executed on March 8. Almost simultaneously, there was a rebellion in Cádiz supported by a marine brigade, which was also crushed. In the following days, La Gaceta de Madrid announced "the end of revolutionary attempts on the Peninsula," with a toll of "15 expeditions carried out from different points and under different leaders since the year [18]24." Thanks to an informant paid for information, the police detained several members of the junta led by Marco-Artu in Madrid. Some managed to escape, such as the young Salustiano Olózaga, but others were executed, including Juan de la Torre—because he had shouted "Long live liberty!"—and the bookseller Antonio Miyar.

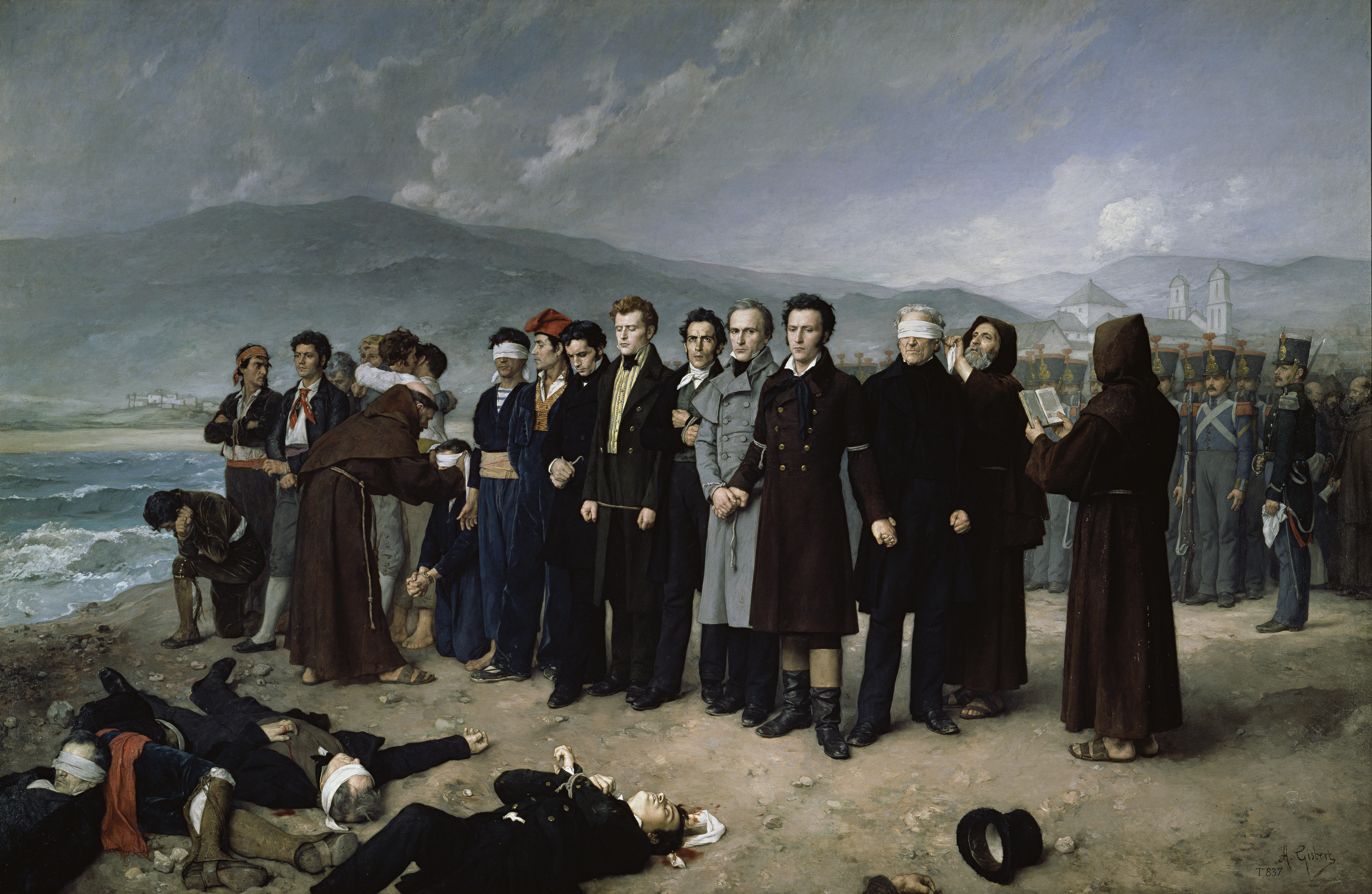
Execution of Torrijos and his Companions on the Beach at Málaga, painting by Antonio Gisbert Pérez, 1888, depicting the execution of Torrijos and his comrades (Prado Museum).

Despite all the setbacks, Torrijos did not lose heart and led a final attempt at a pronunciamiento in the south, which was supposed to receive support from the liberals within the country. On December 2, 1831, he landed at Fuengirola, deceived by Málaga's governor Vicente González Moreno, who had posed as a liberal conspirator and organized the trap that led to the capture of Torrijos and the fifty men who accompanied him, who carried the Spanish tricolor flag and shouted "Long live liberty!" They were executed on the Huelin beach on December 11. In reward, González Moreno was promoted to Captain General of Granada. The news of Torrijos' execution and that of his comrades, spread throughout Europe, caused deep shock in public opinion, especially in France and Great Britain, where many newspaper articles condemned the actions of the Spanish government.

The execution of Torrijos "ended the trajectory of an iconic figure in the way of understanding liberalism and a long sequence of insurrectionary projects based on the pronunciamiento. This strategy was abandoned as a method to overthrow absolutism and as a form of understanding the liberal revolution. Liberalism would arrive through a complex process of transition, whose configuration had already begun." A few months earlier, in May, Mariana Pineda, a young widow from Granada, had been executed after a purple flag was found in her possession—the third color of the liberals' tricolored flag—on which the words "Liberty, Equality, Law" were half-embroidered. She became a martyr for the liberal cause, and her execution embodied the cruel repression of the regime, revealing its decay.

=== End of the reign and succession conflict ===
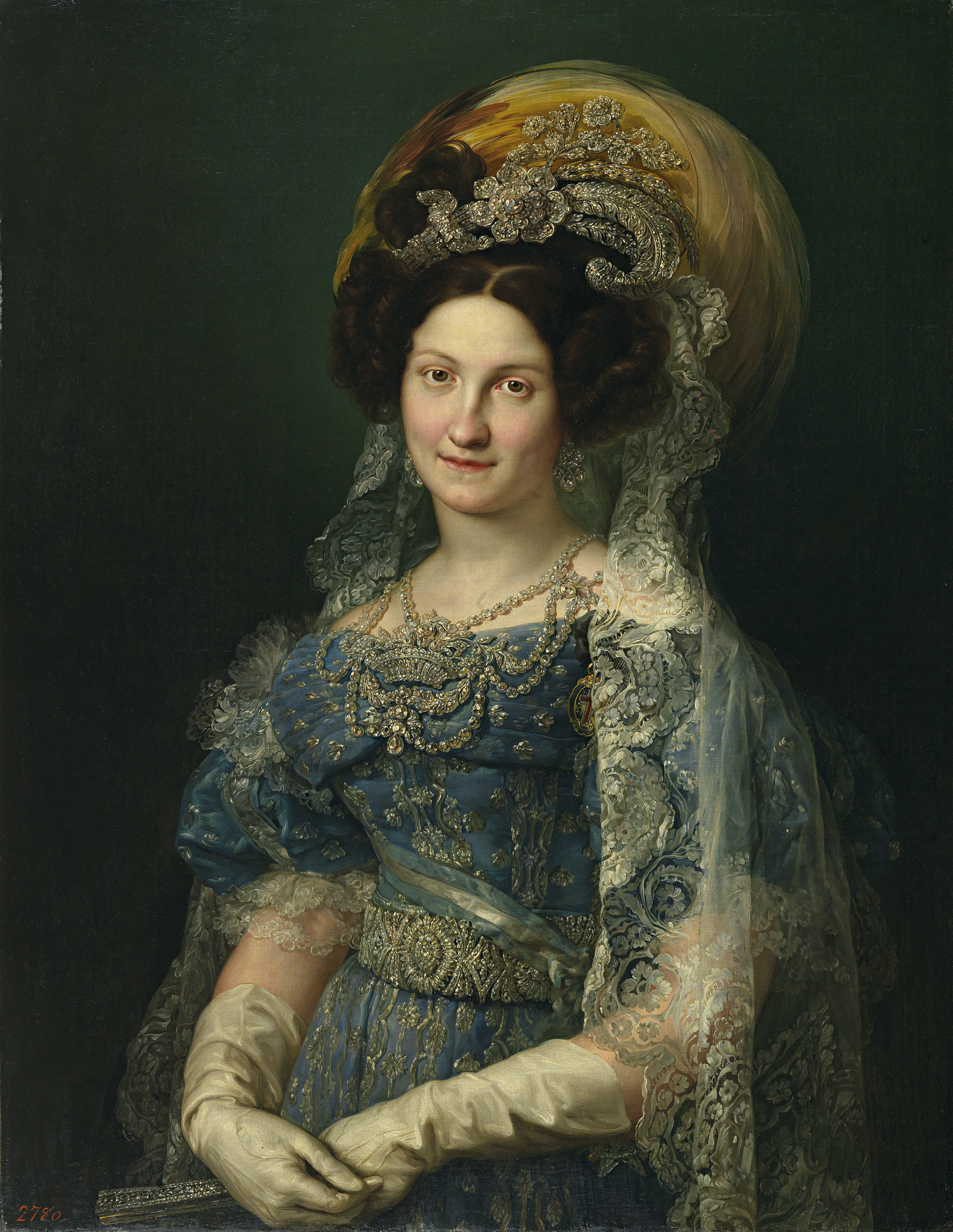
Portrait of Maria Christina of the Two Sicilies by Vicente López.

After the sudden death of his third wife, Marie-Josèphe of Saxony, on May 19, 1829, the king announced four months later—on September 26—that he was going to remarry, with the 22-year-old Neapolitan princess Maria Christina of the Two Sicilies, his niece. They were married by proxy on December 9—the marriage was ratified on the 11th—and on March 31 of the following year, the monarch made public the Pragmatic Sanction of 1789, approved at the beginning of his father Charles IV's reign, which abolished the Inheritance regulations of 1713 that had established the Salic law in Spain, prohibiting women from inheriting the throne. Thus, Ferdinand VII ensured that, should he finally have an heir, his son or daughter would succeed him. In early May 1830, a month after the promulgation of the Pragmatic, Marie-Christine's pregnancy was announced, and on October 10, a daughter, Isabel II, was born, so the infant Charles of Bourbon was deprived of the succession, to the great consternation of his ultra-absolutist supporters, who were already known as "Carlists."

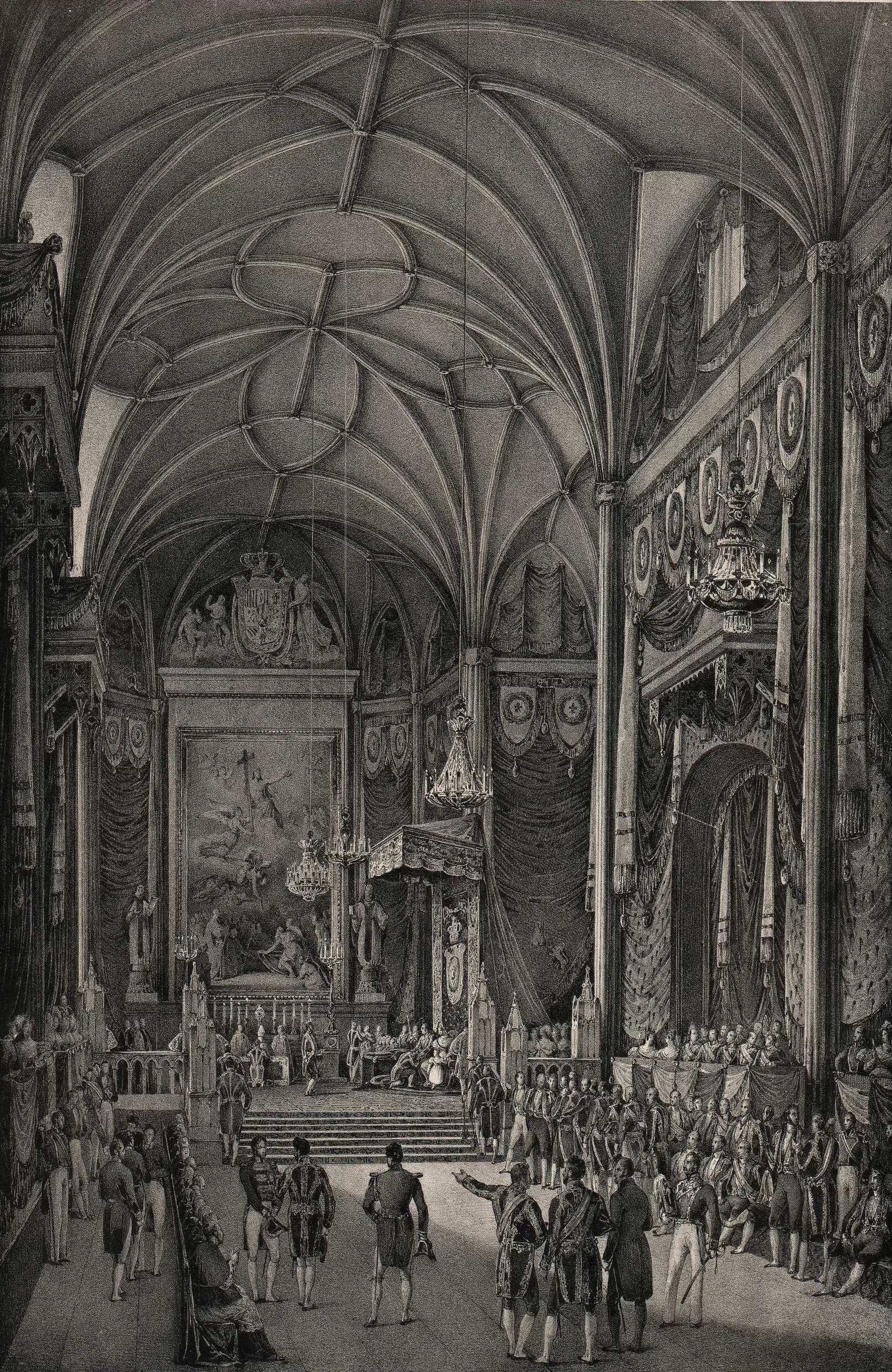
Engraving of Princess Isabella's oath before the Cortes assembled in the church of Saint Jerome the Royal on June 20, 1833. The "sumptuous" ceremony was followed by ten days of festivities: rejón bullfights on Madrid's plaza Mayor, military simulacra and more.

The Carlists, who were caught by surprise by the publication of the 1789 Pragmatic, did not resign themselves to the idea of the very young Isabel becoming the future queen and tried to take advantage of the worsening health of Ferdinand VII—who was convalescing at the Royal Palace of La Granja de San Ildefonso (Segovia) on September 16, 1832. His wife, Queen Marie-Christine, under the pressure of the "ultra" ministers—Count of La Alcudia and Calomarde—and the ambassador from the Kingdom of Naples—supported by the Austrian ambassador, who conspired behind the scenes—and deceived by them, who assured her that the army would not support her regency when the king died, and seeking to avoid a civil war as she later claimed, influenced her husband to revoke the Pragmatic Sanction of March 31, 1830. On September 18, the king signed the annulment of the Salic Law.

Unexpectedly, the king regained his health and dismissed his government on October 1. On December 31, he annulled the derogatory decree in a solemn act that had never been published—the king had signed it on the condition that it would not appear in the official bulletin La Gaceta de Madrid until his death—but the Carlists had made it public. Thus, the two-year-old Princess Isabel became the heir to the throne once again.

The definitive break with the Carlists occurred following the government's decision on February 3, 1833, to expel the Princess of Beira from the court due to her direct involvement in ultra-conspiracies and the influence she exerted on her brother-in-law, Charles of Bourbon, encouraging him to assert his claims to the succession against the king's daughter. Unexpectedly, Charles communicated that, along with his wife Marie Françoise of Braganza and their children, he would accompany his sister-in-law on her journey to Portugal. They left Madrid on March 16 and arrived in Lisbon on the 29th. In doing so, Charles avoided recognizing Isabel as Princess of Asturias and heir to the throne. In the following weeks, Ferdinand VII and his brother Charles exchanged an extensive correspondence in which it became clear that Charles refused to recognize Isabel, sealing the definitive break between them. The king ultimately ordered him to settle in the Papal States and never return to Spain, offering him a frigate for the journey; however, Charles never complied with this order, giving various excuses. On June 20, 1833, the Cortes convened at the Church of Saint Jerome the Royal, as in 1789, for the Princess Isabella's oath as heir to the throne. Three months later, on Sunday, September 29, 1833, King Ferdinand VII died, and the First Carlist War began, a civil war for the succession of the crown between, on one side, the supporters of Isabel and Regent Marie-Christine, and on the other, the "Carlists," supporters of his uncle Charles.

== See also ==
- Peninsular War
- Spain under Joseph Bonaparte
- Reign of Isabella II

== Bibliography ==
- Arnabat, Ramon (2020). "La contrarrevolución y la antirrevolución" [Counterrevolution and anti-revolution]. El Trienio Liberal (1820-1823). Una mirada política [The Liberal Triennium (1820-1823). A political view] (in Spanish). Granada: Comares. pp. 285–307. ISBN 978-84-9045-976-8.
- Artola Renedo, Andoni (2020). "Política religiosa" [Religious policy]. El Trienio Liberal (1820-1823). Una mirada política [The Liberal Triennium (1820-1823). A political view] (in Spanish). Granada: Comares. pp. 263–284. ISBN 978-84-9045-976-8.
- Bahamonde, Ángel; Martínez, Jesús Antonio (2011). Historia de España. Siglo XIX [History of Spain. 19th Century] (in Spanish) (6th ed.). Madrid: Cátedra. ISBN 978-84-376-1049-8.
- Butrón Prida, Gonzalo (2020). "Los Cien Mil Hijos de San Luis" [The Hundred Thousand Sons of Saint Louis]. El Trienio Liberal (1820-1823). Una mirada política [The Liberal Triennium (1820-1823). A political view] (in Spanish). Granada: Comares. pp. 555–570. ISBN 978-84-9045-976-8.
- Carr, Raymond (2003). España : 1808-1975 [Spain: 1808-1975]. Ariel Historia (in Spanish) (12th ed.). Barcelona: Ariel. ISBN 84-344-6615-5.
- Fernández Sarasola, Ignacio (2009). "Conspiraciones constitucionales en España" [Constitutional conspiracies in Spain]. Historia constitucional: Revista Electrónica de Historia constitucional (in French) (10): 485–494. Archived from the original on June 19, 2019.
- Fontana, Josep (1979). La crisis del Antiguo Régimen, 1808-1833 [The crisis of the Ancien Régime, 1808-1833] (in Spanish). Barcelona: Crítica. ISBN 84-7423-084-5.
- Fontana, Josep (2006). De en medio del tiempo. La segunda restauración española, 1823-1834 [From the middle of time. The second Spanish restoration, 1823-1834] (in Spanish). Barcelona: Crítica. ISBN 978-84-8432-792-9.
- Fontana, Josep (2007). Historia de España [Spain History] (in Spanish). Vol. 6 : La época del liberalismo. Barcelona, Madrid: Crítica/Marcial Pons. ISBN 978-84-8432-876-6.
- Frasquet, Ivana (2020). "La España americana" [American Spain]. El Trienio Liberal (1820-1823). Una mirada política [The Liberal Triennium (1820-1823). A political view] (in Spanish). Granada: Comares. pp. 155–184. ISBN 978-84-9045-976-8.
- Fuentes, Juan Francisco (2007). El fin del Antiguo Régimen (1808-1868). Política y sociedad [The end of the Ancien Régime (1808-1868). Politics and society] (in Spanish). Vol. 6 : La época del liberalismo. Madrid: Síntesis. ISBN 978-84-975651-5-8.
- Francisco Fuentes, Juan (2008). ""Yo no valgo nada": Rafael del Riego y la revolución liberal española" ["I am worth nothing": Rafael del Riego and the Spanish liberal revolution]. Liberales eminentes [Eminent liberals] (in Spanish). Madrid: Marcial Pons. pp. 13–41. ISBN 978-84-96467-66-8.
- Gil Novales, Alberto (2020). El Trienio Liberal [The Liberal Triennium] (in Spanish). Zaragoza: Prensas de la Universidad de Zaragoza. ISBN 978-84-1340-071-6.
- Glover, Michael (1972). Legacy of Glory. The Bonaparte Kingdom of Spain, 1808-1813. London: Leo Cooper. ISBN 978-06-8412-558-9.
- La Parra López, Emilio (2014). "La restauración de Fernando VII en 1814" [The restoration of Fernando VII in 1814]. Historia constitucional: Revista Electrónica de Historia Constitucional (in Spanish) (15): 205–222. Archived from the original on May 3, 2019.
- La Parra López, Emilio (2018). Fernando VII. Un rey deseado y detestado [Fernando VII. A king both desired and detested] (in Spanish). Barcelona: Tusquets. ISBN 978-84-9066-512-1.
- Luis, Jean-Philippe (2001). "La década ominosa (1823-1833), una etapa desconocida en la construcción de la España contemporánea" [The ominous decade (1823-1833), an unknown stage in the construction of contemporary Spain] (PDF). Ayer (in Spanish) (41): 85–110. Archived from the original (PDF) on June 21, 2012.
- París Martín, Álvaro (2020). "Milicia Nacional" [National Militia]. El Trienio Liberal (1820-1823). Una mirada política [The Liberal Triennium (1820-1823). A political view] (in Spanish). Granada: Comares. pp. 213–237. ISBN 978-84-9045-976-8.
- Ramos Santana, Alberto (2020). "De Cádiz a Las Cabezas de San Juan y viceversa. El pronunciamiento de Riego" [From Cádiz to Las Cabezas de San Juan and vice versa. The Riego declaration]. Andalucía en la historia (in Spanish) (68): 76–79. Archived from the original on February 3, 2021.
- Rújula, Pedro (2020). "El Rey" [The King]. El Trienio Liberal (1820-1823). Una mirada política [The Liberal Triennium (1820-1823). A political view] (in Spanish). Granada: Comares. pp. 3–38. ISBN 978-84-9045-976-8.
- Rújula, Pedro; Chust, Manuel (2020). El Trienio Liberal en la monarquía hispánica. Revolución e independencia (1820-1823) [The Liberal Triennium in the Spanish monarchy. Revolution and independence (1820-1823)] (in Spanish). Madrid: Los Libros de la Catarata. ISBN 978-84-9097-937-2.
- Sánchez Martín, Víctor (2020). "El ejército" [The Army]. El Trienio Liberal (1820-1823). Una mirada política [The Liberal Triennium (1820-1823). A political view] (in Spanish). Granada: Comares. pp. 131–153. ISBN 978-84-9045-976-8.
- Simal, Juan Luis (2020). "El exilio" [Exile]. El Trienio Liberal (1820-1823). Una mirada política [The Liberal Triennium (1820-1823). A political view] (in Spanish). Granada: Comares. pp. 571–594. ISBN 978-84-9045-976-8.
- Torras Elias, Jaume (1967). La guerra de los Agraviados [The War of the Aggrieved] (in Spanish). Barcelona: Universitat de Barcelona.
- de la Torre del Río, Rosario (2011). "El falso tratado secreto de Verona de 1822" [The false secret treaty of Verona of 1822]. Cuadernos de Historia Contemporánea (in Spanish). 33: 284–293. Archived from the original on March 5, 2016.
- Torre del Río, Rosario (2020). "El escenario internacional" [The international scene]. El Trienio Liberal (1820-1823). Una mirada política [The Liberal Triennium (1820-1823). A political view] (in Spanish). Granada: Comares. pp. 515–516. ISBN 978-84-9045-976-8.
