= 1835 Spain anti-clerical riots =

Riots against religious orders in Spain

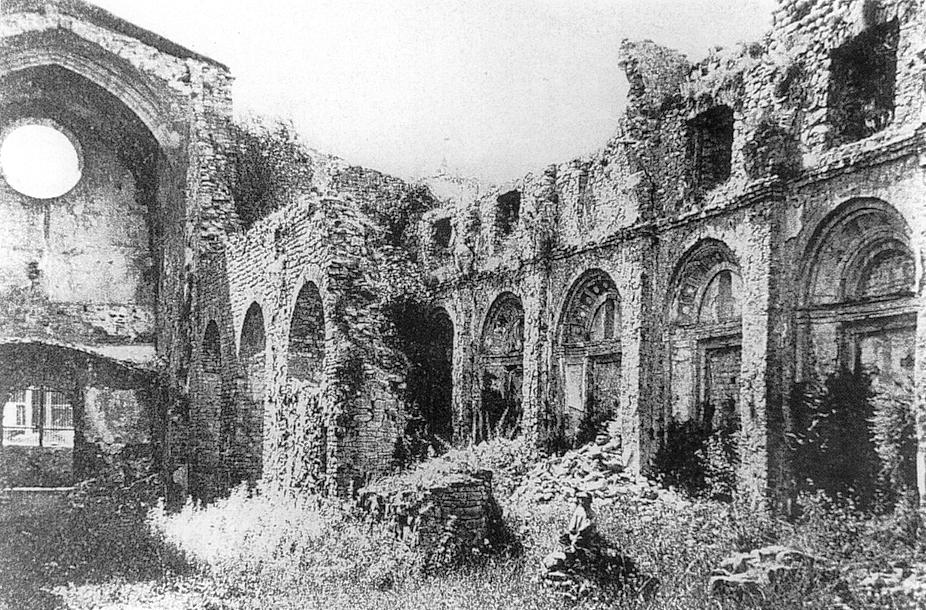
Monastery of Santa Maria de Ripoll after the attack and fire during the bullangues of 1835.

The anti-clerical riots of 1835 were revolts against the religious orders in Spain, fundamentally for their support of the Carlists in the civil war that began after the death of King Ferdinand VII at the end of 1833, and which took place during the summer of 1835 in Aragon and, above all, in Catalonia, within the context of the uprisings of the Spanish Liberal Revolution that sought to put an end to the regime of the Royal Statute, implemented in 1834 by the regent María Cristina de Borbón-Dos Sicilias, and to give way to a constitutional monarchy with the reestablishment of the Constitution of 1812.

The most important anticlerical riots took place in Zaragoza and in Reus, Barcelona and other Catalan towns (where the popular riots between 1835 and 1843 are known by the name of bullangues), during which numerous convents and monasteries were assaulted and seventy members of the regular clergy and eight priests were killed, reminiscent of what had happened a year earlier in the 1834 massacre of friars in Madrid. The riots were an urban phenomenon; the rural parish priests sided with the working classes. "All the revolutionary movements that broke out in several cities during the summer of 1835 and manifested themselves in the burning of convents and in the repudiation of the Royal Statute have the same common denominator: hostility to the regular clergy, motivated either by their intervention in the repression after the Liberal Triennium, or by their sympathies for Carlism."

== Background ==
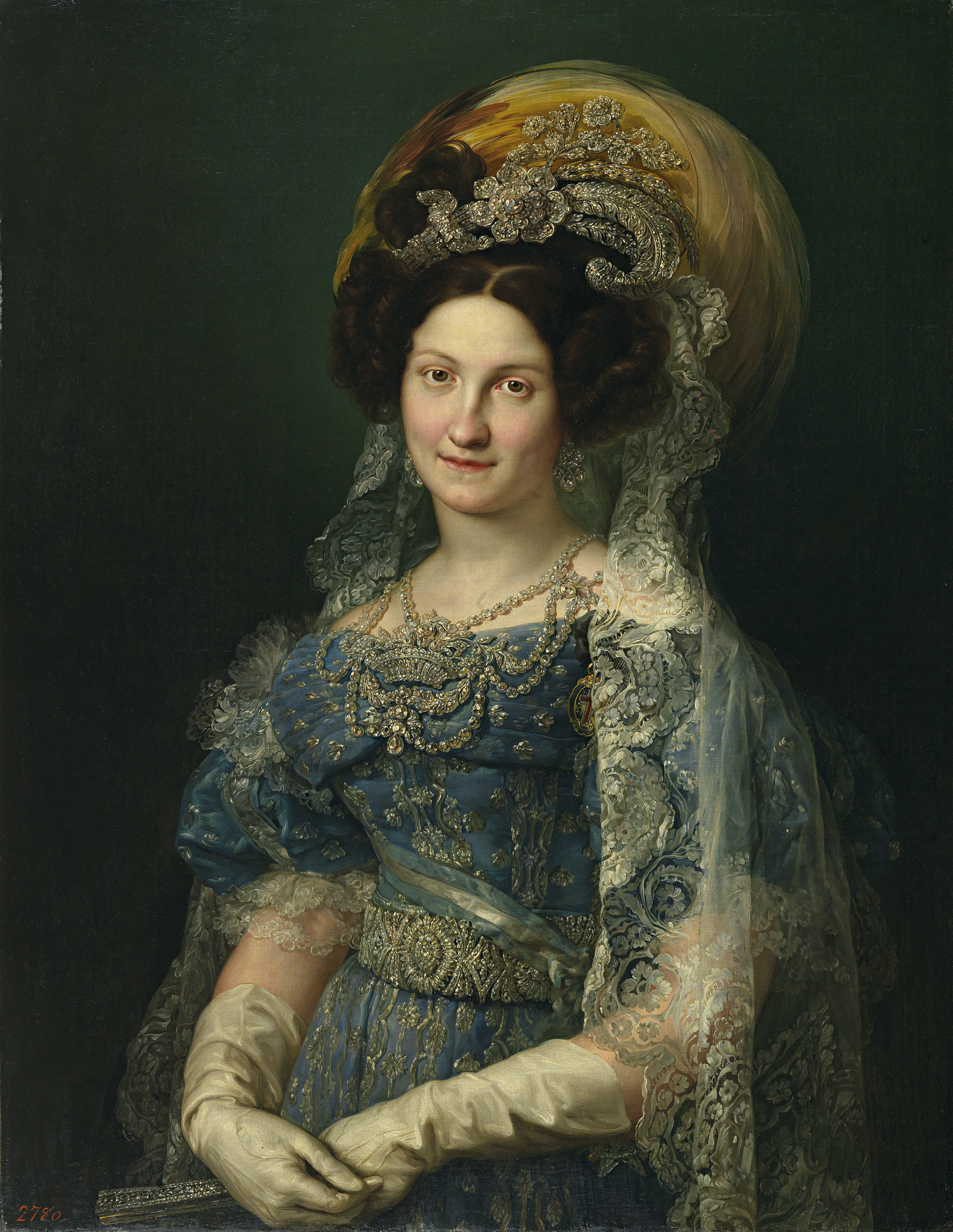
The regent María Cristina de Borbón-Dos Sicilias.

At the end of July 1834 the Cortes were opened, convened according to the provisions of the Royal Statute, a kind of granted charter promulgated by María Cristina de Borbón-Dos Sicilias, who ruled the throne on behalf of her daughter, the future Isabella II, who was then four years old, and whose succession rights had not been recognized by the Carlists, the supporters of the brother of the recently deceased King Ferdinand VII, Carlos María Isidro de Borbón, who did not accept the Pragmatic Sanction of 1830 that abolished the Salic Law that did not allow women to reign, so he lost his rights to the throne in favor of his brother's newborn daughter. After the death of King Ferdinand VII at the end of September 1833, the succession lawsuit derived in a civil war, the First Carlist War, which soon became a political and ideological conflict, between the supporters of maintaining the Old Regime, the absolutists who mostly supported Don Carlos, and the defenders of a more or less radical change towards a "new regime", who defended the rights to the throne of Isabel II, so they were called "isabelinos" or "cristinos", after the name of the regent. A few days before the opening of those Cortes, the massacre of friars took place in Madrid in 1834, during which about eighty members of the regular clergy -most of whom sympathized with and supported the Carlist cause- were murdered because of the rumor that spread through the capital that the "friars had poisoned the fountains", which would have caused the terrible cholera epidemic that devastated the city -in July 1834 alone it claimed more than three thousand lives- and the rest of Spain.

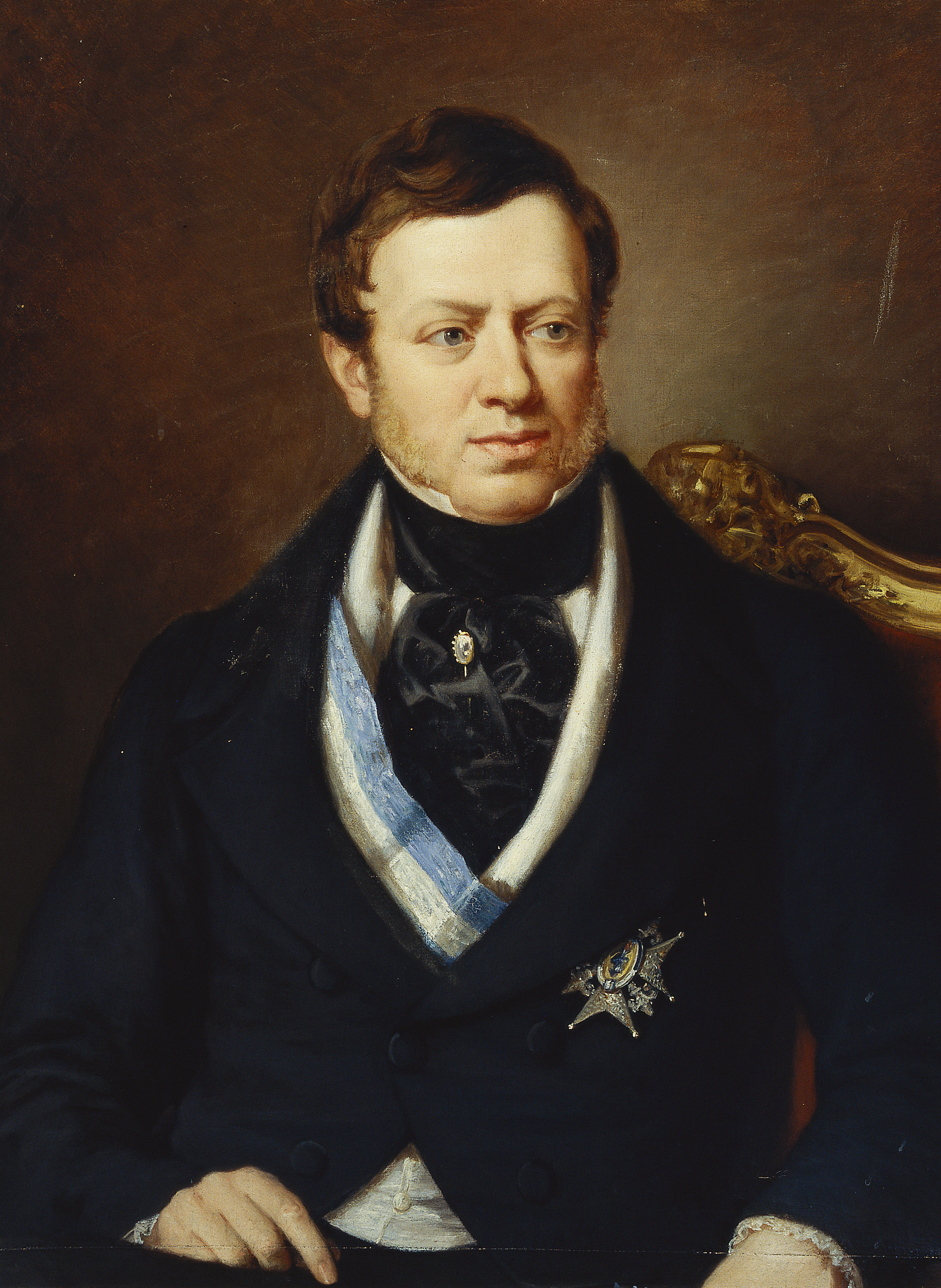
José María Queipo de Llano, VII Count of Toreno.

A clearly liberal opposition soon appeared in the Cortes, which considered the political framework established by the Royal Statute to be insufficient because it did not recognize the principle of national sovereignty. Thus the procurators Joaquín María López, Fermín Caballero and the Count of Las Navas, addressed a letter to the regent in which they asked for a declaration of the political rights of the Spaniards, but the government of the moderate liberal Francisco Martínez de la Rosa rejected it. Months later a Law of City Councils began to be discussed so that at least at the local level the representative regime derived from the principle of national sovereignty would be accepted, but again the government did not admit it, although it meant an enormous attrition, and this together with the adverse march of the civil war caused its fall on July 6, 1835.

Martínez de la Rosa's successor was the more clearly liberal José María Queipo de Llano, VII Count of Toreno, who formed a heterogeneous government, ranging from aristocratic figures such as Pedro Agustín Girón, Marquis de Las Amarillas, to the progressive liberal Juan Álvarez Mendizábal, who was in exile in London. But this government was soon overwhelmed by a number of revolutionary movements, including the anti-clerical riots in Zaragoza and Reus, Barcelona and other Catalan towns, which took place in July and August 1835 and led to the creation of revolutionary juntas that did not recognize its authority. The government of the Count of Toreno tried to calm tempers by decreeing the expulsion of the Jesuits, which was interpreted by the Holy See as a declaration of war, breaking diplomatic relations on August 6, and on July 25 suppressing the convents with less than 12 religious, the same day that the "bullanga" of Barcelona took place, but the objective of the Liberal Revolution in Spain in religious matters went much further: the suppression of the religious orders and the confiscation of their goods.

== Anti-clerical riots in Zaragoza ==
=== Riot of April 3 ===
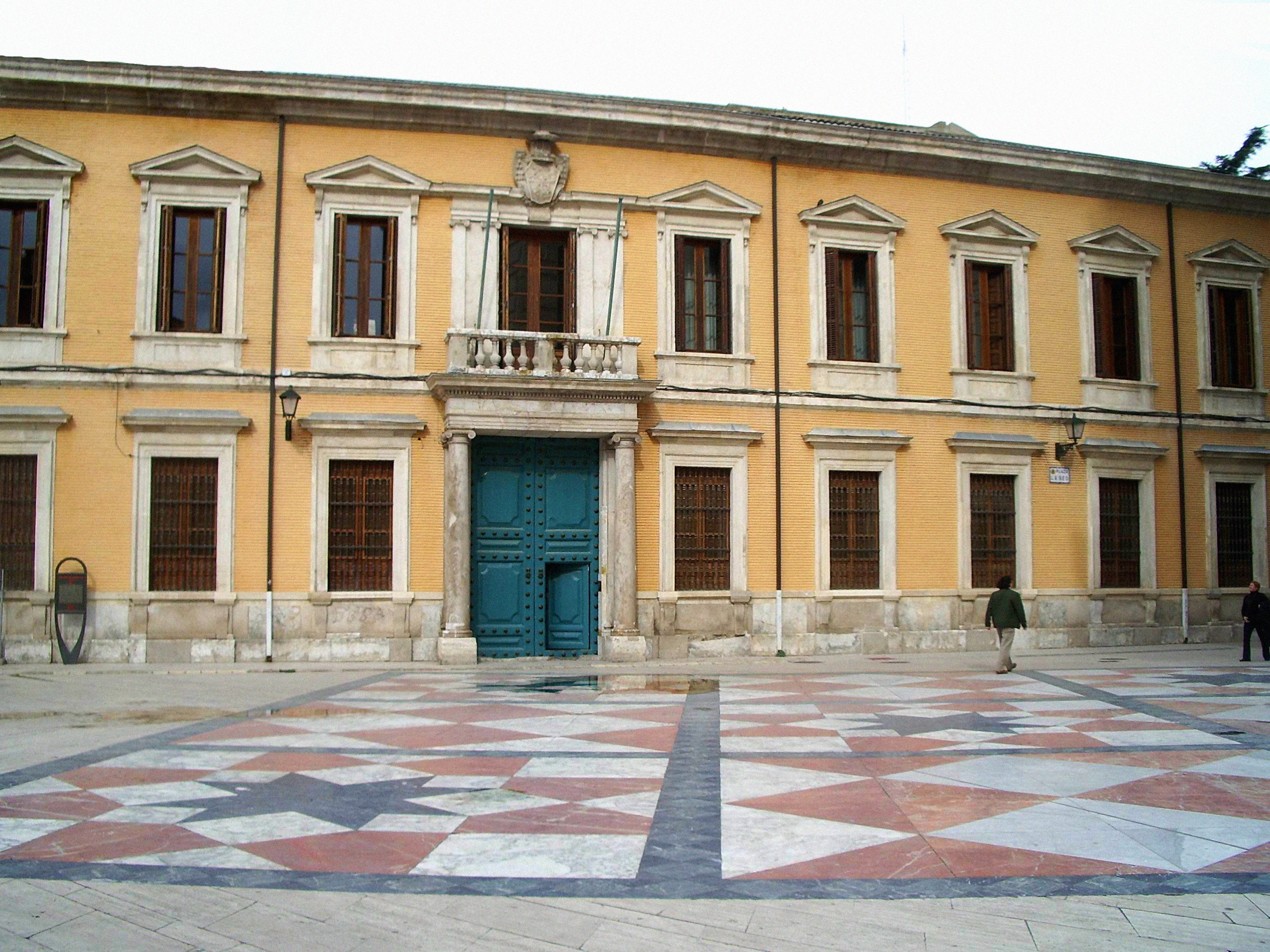
Archbishop's Palace of Zaragoza in the Plaza de la Seo.

The anticlerical riot of Zaragoza on July 6, had an antecedent in the spring, on April 3, when a multitude went to the archiepiscopal palace to protest against the decision of its holder Bernardo Francés Caballero, of absolutist ideas -although he had not made any manifestation favorable to the cause of the Carlists-, for having withdrawn the licenses of confession and preaching to two clergymen who were chaplains of the urban militia for their reproachable conduct -in a letter sent on April 18 to the government the archbishop accused them of leading a licentious life-. The crowd was led by a lay friar, Crisóstomo de Caspe, organist of the convent of Minims in the city. Specifically, the liberal newspaper El Eco del Comercio pointed him out as the author of the murder of four or five religious who died in the incidents of that day -later the friar enlisted in the liberal army and was shot by the Carlists in the Bajo Arágón-.

The riot began in the afternoon when a crowd gathered in the Plaza de la Seo in front of the archbishop's palace shouting "Death to the archbishop and death to the traitors!", or "Death to the archbishop, death to the cabildo!", according to other versions. As the deployment of the troops and the urban militia by order of the captain general prevented the assault on the episcopal palace, the crowd then went to the convent of La Victoria, where four friars were killed, and then to the convent of San Diego, where two others were killed. At night the incidents were repeated, they stabbed a Franciscan layman and left a priest badly wounded. Although it seems that in the assault on the convent of Minim de la Victoria a detachment of the militia stopped the mutineers, "the passivity, however, is the note of the military garrison in the attack on the Franciscan convent of San Diego, located right in front of the general captaincy, and in which two friars were killed".

By order of the captain general, the archbishop left Zaragoza with military escort and after passing through Lérida he took refuge in France, specifically in Bordeaux, where he would reside until his death in 1843. In the following days, 114 absolutist clergymen hastily left the city.

It has been suggested that behind the riot there were mainly economic motivations: the abolition of the tithe charged by the Church and the confiscation of its goods. During that spring there was another riot in Murcia against the authorities who had absolutist sympathies, although those who died that time were not ecclesiastics, but a former royalist volunteer scribe, the bishop's cook and another citizen.

=== Riot of July 6 ===
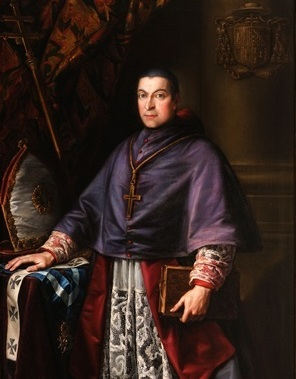
Archbishop Bernardo Francés Caballero, attributed to Luis López Piquer. Ca. 1843-1850 (Diputación Provincial de Zaragoza).

The most serious anticlerical riot in Zaragoza took place on July 6. It all began the day before when an attempt of pronunciamiento in favor of the Constitution of 1812 by a company commanded by Lieutenant Blas Pover, was put down and its commander arrested and imprisoned. On the 6th a multitude integrated by members of the urban militia together with men and women of the popular classes demanded the liberty of the lieutenant and spread proclamations against the government. Faced with the refusal of the Captain General to free the officer, "the rioters searched for the absolutists, killed one, disobeyed the order of formation dictated by the Captain General for the militia and immediately went through the streets of the city, with republican cries, against absolutist houses and against the convents of Santo Domingo, San Lázaro and San Agustín. Women and children participated in the destruction in a real riot against what for centuries had meant the privilege of a sacred precinct". Eleven friars of different orders died, under arms or suffocated by smoke.

The response of the authorities was to execute Lieutenant Pover and seven of his companions, as well as several individuals who had participated in the incidents. The government, for its part, dismissed the captain general, whom the newspaper La Abeja of July 13 accused of having given arms to men of the proletarian class, who would have participated in the assaults on the convents, an argument already used by the liberal press on the occasion of the massacre of friars in Madrid in 1834. This idea that there had been complicity of the urban militia and the authorities with the rioters was also picked up by a report sent to his government by the French ambassador in Madrid, Count de Rayneval. Another report by a French agent noted the fact that many peasants in the towns refused to pay the tithes, so some historians consider that the question of the tithes was possibly one of the causes of the riot, - the archbishop on some occasion had requested the intervention of the authorities of the province to be able to collect the tithes, not only in the capital but also in many towns-. "It should not be forgotten that the Church in Zaragoza possessed at least one fifth of the wealth of Aragon, which could be the cause of the popular opposition to the representatives of the Church, and furthermore, a part of the regular clergy, and above all the archbishopric, was involved in anti-government activities". "Indeed, in the case of Zaragoza, one can see the resounding economic and political animosity to an institution [the Church] bent on preserving its privileges, possessions and its own taxes".

After the riot, the regular clergy disbanded, which made it possible to immediately propose the suppression "at least of the destroyed convents... [to quell] in part the ardent desires of this population for the reform of the regulars". "On July 11, the officers of the militia met at the University -it must be remembered that they were all landowners, merchants, liberal professions- the "honest neighbors", and presented the indispensable measures "so that order would be maintained". The first and most urgent was to "absolutely suppress the regulars of Zaragoza", and also to separate the ideologically suspicious public employees and to speed up the work of the board appointed by the government more than a year ago for the reform of the clergy, as well as the commission of the Cortes for the freedom of the press. Four measures were intertwined as part of the same revolutionary objective. Subsequently, the Junta established in Zaragoza would explain the motivations for such behavior in a text that revealed the resentment accumulated since 1823 against the clergy, to charge "a religious community to the point of superstition" with revenge as if it had been a blind and collective action, without direction, but above all to conclude before the regent, as the highest institutional authority, that if she wanted to "calm public anxiety", the "first indispensable providence" was none other than the suppression of all religious convents "declaring their buildings and goods national property". It was the demand of the major contributors constituted in a revolutionary junta, who also defined themselves as "wealthy classes" and that in this logic of transformations, at the time of August, they could already finish their proclamation declaring themselves "as idolaters of order as of freedom". To the Zaragoza riot, the Madrid government -responsible, in short, to an absolute regent- responded with the organization of a state of exception. However, the liberal opposition proposed in the pages of the Eco del Comercio its rejection of repression, an unfeasible method to "ensure public order, neither in Zaragoza nor in other places", because the formula was none other than the liberal revolution itself, which at that time had so many interests".

== Anti-clerical riots in Catalonia ==
=== "Bullanga" of Reus ===
In Reus, a liberal city in the middle of a territory favorable to Carlism, hostility towards the members of the regular clergy, especially towards the Franciscans, dated back to the Ominous Decade of the reign of Ferdinand VII when they denounced the liberals and fomented the uprising of the Agraviados of 1827. In fact, during the summer of 1834, when the massacre of friars in Madrid in 1834 took place, there was also a rumor, as in Madrid, that the friars had poisoned the city's wells and had caused the cholera epidemic. Some witnesses of the time recall that the friars were so unpopular that they could hardly circulate in the streets without being insulted. The refrain of a popular song entitled "Sanch y fetge menjarem" ('blood and liver we will eat') was "Y morin los caps pelats" ('let the bald heads die').

What motivated the "bullanga" in Reus was the attack suffered on July 19, 1835 by a party of urban militiamen by a Carlist party, in which the second lieutenant J. A. Montserrat and four urban militiamen died (plus an ensign and two volunteers from Gandesa), since apparently among the attackers there were friars and one of them had ordered to crucify and remove the eyes of one of his victims. This is what the historian Antonio de Bofarull states:

Having killed six soldiers and an urban officer... the attackers had entertained themselves in crucifying them, gouging out their eyes and other barbarities, on the advice of one of the friars who was in the group.

The climate of tension that arose when the facts became known caused the military governor of the province of Tarragona to immediately send a detachment of 200 soldiers at the request of the mayor and the superiors of the convents. This did not prevent that during the night of July 22 several convents were assaulted and set on fire where twelve Franciscan friars and nine Carmelites were killed. The army did not intervene in these events. This is how a chronicler of the time explained it:

At half to eleven o'clock at night the town of Reus was disturbed, shooting bullets at the air, and immediately the individuals were all together, and the first thing they did was to surround the convent of San Francisco and, when the friars saw this, they rang the bell three times for help, trusting the troops that had come for their protection, which could not calm them down, because they saw that it would be bad for them.

This is how the liberal newspaper El Eco del Comercio reported the news:

At 10 o'clock at night, gathering in one of the many and growing groups that had scattered in the town, after having forcibly removed all the fuel they could find from the brick kilns. There was an infinity of women loaded with firewood and carrying large pots full of turpentine oil and other highly inflammable materials. Thus assembled, they ran in droves to San Francisco, set fire to the building, and at the same time stabbed with knives as many friars as they could find.

According to Antonio Moliner Prada, the ultimate cause of the riot was to be found in "the anti-clericalism that was felt in many places, as well as the help that some convents gave to the Carlists, or the importance that a future disentailment could have".

=== "Bullanga" of Barcelona on Sant Jaume's day. ===
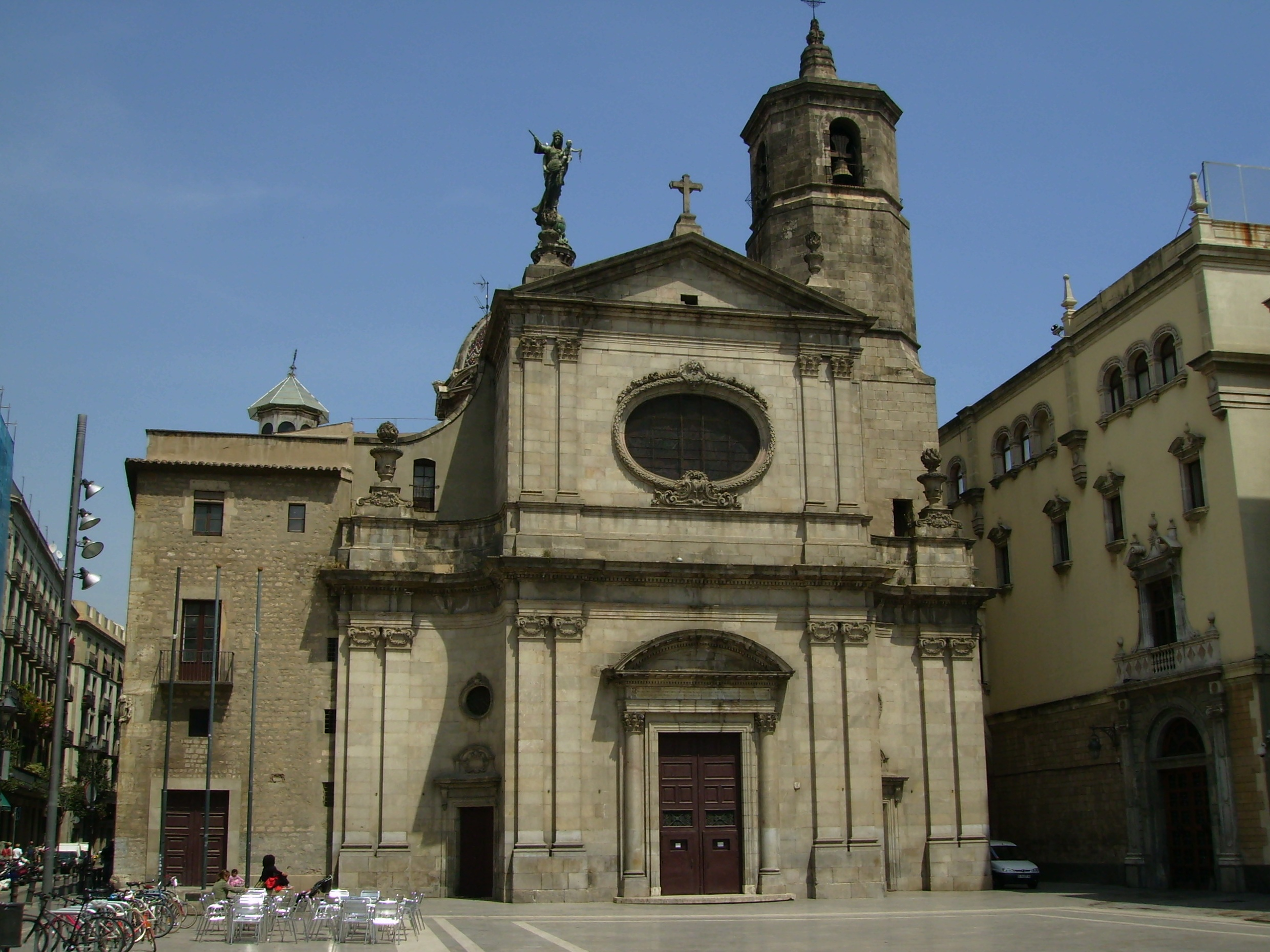
Basilica of La Merced in Barcelona today.

The repercussions of the anticlerical riot of Reus spread throughout the regions of the province of Tarragona, and also reached Barcelona, where as in Reus there was a strong anticlerical feeling especially among the popular classes who were bearing the burden and the "blood" of the civil war while many of the friars were on the side of the Carlists, whom they helped economically and some of them even took up arms. In the streets of the city it was common to hear songs like "Mentre hi hagi frares, mai anirem be" ("While there are friars we will never go well") or to call them "paparres" ("ticks") and sometimes they even received "trunks, stones and even some bricks and a slap", according to a canon.

It was a minor incident in Barcelona that triggered the riot of July 25. The public attending a bullfight for the day of Sant Jaume began to destroy the square of Barceloneta -when the fifth bull arrived they tore up benches and chairs and threw them into the square - because the bulls had been tame and when the bullfight ended they dragged the sixth dead bull through the streets of the city, stoning the convents of La Merced and San Francisco in the process.

At the same time, another group burned down the "caseta de los consumos" (the place where the municipal officials, "burots", collected the hated taxes for the entrance of merchandise into the city) and then, led by the well-known liberal Manuel Rivadeneyra, they tried to attack the convent of San Francisco, but they only managed to burn the doors. Late at night several groups set fire to six convents: that of the Discalced Trinitarians -where today is the Liceo-, that of San José of the Discalced Carmelites -where today is the market of La Boquería-, that of the Augustinians in Hospital street, that of the Carmelites in Carmen street, that of San Francisco de Paula of the Minims, in Sant Pere street, and that of the Dominicans in Santa Catalina -where today is the market of the same name-. Other religious buildings were attacked, but without being set on fire, as in the case of the seminary of San Vicente de Paul on Amalia Street, where friars and seminarians managed to confront the attackers with clubs and firearms. The assaults on these convents in some cases were carried out at the same time, so they were the work of different groups. Many friars escaped and were picked up by the army and the urban militia who transferred them to the castle of Montjuic, but others did not make it and 16 of them were killed.

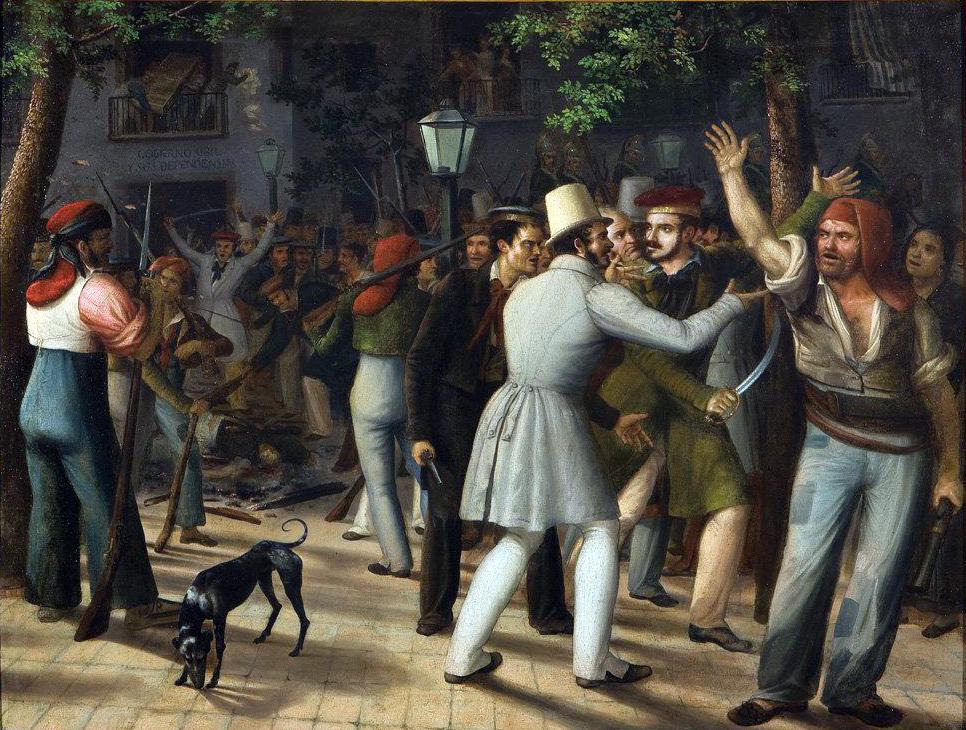
"La patuleia" Bullanga of August 5, 1835. Museu de Historia de Barcelona.

Neither the army nor the urban militia intervened since, according to historian Antonio Moliner Prada, their members sympathized more with the rioters than with the religious, and some of them even participated in the riots. On the other hand, the City Council, despite the fact that it was constituted in permanent session, also failed to carry out any coordinated action with the forces of order to prevent the riots. "The records of the City Council (July 25 at night) reflect that still at 1.30 a.m. neither the firemen nor the military force had made an appearance in order to suffocate and prevent the fires in the convents". Only the following day, July 26, "the authorities took some measures to restore order: they published a proclamation that avoided any responsibility for the events of the previous day, arrested some people, ordered the dissolution of the groups of people who remained in the streets, ordered the closing of the entrance gates to the city to prevent the entry of people from nearby towns, and urged the bosses to open their factories and workshops".

The liberal newspaper El Vapor explained with a notable detachment and without providing many details of what had happened, nor of the death of "a few" friars:

On the afternoon of the 25th the people went on a rampage in the bullring, on the occasion of the bulls being too peaceful to give interest to the fight. From there they went out in droves to set fire to the convents of this capital. The fire caught fire in six of them (...) Nothing was stolen. A few regulars perished in the midst of the confusion of the disorder. The authorities ordered the formation of the garrison and the militia in order to avoid damages. One of their wise measures was to gather the communities and transfer them to the fort of Atarazanas and from there to the fort of Monjuí [sic], where they remained safe.

"The liberal pamphlets of the time repeatedly insist that the priests and the nuns' convents did not suffer any attack, nor were there any robberies during the bullanga. (...) F. Raull insists that all the work was carried out in perfect order before numerous surprised and dumbfounded spectators and others who rejoiced at what they were contemplating. (...) The account of the events published in the London newspaper The Times of August 7, whose author witnessed the assault on these convents, also coincides with these appreciations:

The confusion produced by the circumstances and the numerous attempts at robbery were overcome by the impetus shown in this horrible work of destruction. The arsonists did not appropriate any money or objects of value. The gold and silver chalices and other objects of great value were thrown into the fire as soon as they were found, and one individual was bludgeoned almost to death for having kept a silk handkerchief.

As for who were the perpetrators of the events, there is no judicial documentation that allows identifying them because, unlike the massacre of friars in Madrid in 1834, no person was tried after the bullanga, and as for whether behind the events there was some secret society that instigated them or it was a spontaneous movement, historians disagree among themselves. Those who defend the conspiratorial thesis affirm that everything was prepared in a secret meeting that took place in a house located in the Rambla de Santa Monica and that the rioters, who were paid, were given the incendiary material. According to the newspaper Panorama Español, the action against the convents was prepared beforehand:

As night fell, some convents began to be assaulted by mobs who had everything ready for the arson.... The night of July 25 was a night of horror and terror. The resounding clamor of the mobs that gave the assault, or celebrated the triumph, could be heard everywhere; the trampling of the horses and the shouts of the chiefs that demanded order filled the intervals of silence left by them.... Few, very few were those who committed these vandalic attacks, but the spectators were infinite.

Ana María García Rovira, on the contrary, affirms that the movement was spontaneous, although she points out that prominent liberals, such as the printer and publisher M. Rivadeneyra, participated in the uproar, trying to organize the popular unrest. Thus, among the rioters there were not only members of the popular classes but also wealthy people who were confronting a common enemy, the friars. This same point of view is defended by Josep Fontana, for whom it seems clear that "a group of liberals, dissatisfied with the regime of the Royal Statute, allowed it to happen, thinking that this explosion of popular unrest could be useful to accelerate the political evolution in its advanced sense". To reinforce his thesis, he quotes the testimony of a witness of the events as he related it years later:

Anything is enough to determine a popular riot when the people are ready to riot. The heated multitude already runs without restraint and during the night sets fire to several convents, kills some friars, and the military authority canonizes with its presence this scandal, as it had canonized the riot and the disorders of the bullring. The people are still alive who, with the ruling baton in their hands, contemplated both scenes, and do not believe, gentlemen, that there is any exaggeration in this, because I was in the square and I remember very well how shocked I was to hear that the authority ordered those who were tearing up the benches to try not to harm themselves (...) It was a question of overthrowing a ministry [a government] and of embarking on a different path from the one that this ministry was following (...).

A similar line is the one maintained by Juan Sisinio Pérez Garzón who emphasizes that in the riot participated relevant social sectors "that lead the popular anger". As evidence, he points out that in the convents "incendiary bottles of turpentine were used, like "Molotov cocktails", which someone had prepared" and that it was repeated, as in the massacre of the friars in Madrid in 1834, "the institutional quietude of the militia and troops and of the authorities". Likewise, the riot was "a collective action of punishment and also of prevention against some friars transformed in the popular imagination as the only cause of the war and its hardships". The same day of the riot of Barcelona "the government of the Count of Toreno decreed the suppression of convents with less than twelve professed religious, but it was also an insufficient measure because it neither suppressed the religious orders, a requirement to nationalize their goods, nor did it adjust to the facts already consummated. Power was no longer in the hands of the regent, but in the hands of the juntas that assumed the revolutionary character of defense and sovereignty in each city. For this reason, this time the government could not open a trial for the violence deployed against the friars in Barcelona. Moreover, the events were explicitly justified and once again the Eco del Comercio leads us to the conclusion that such violence was intended: "the punishment of these excesses alone is not enough [...] it cannot rely exclusively on repression, as it has not been possible to rely on it to this day. There is [...] no other more effective means than the prompt suppression of religious communities".

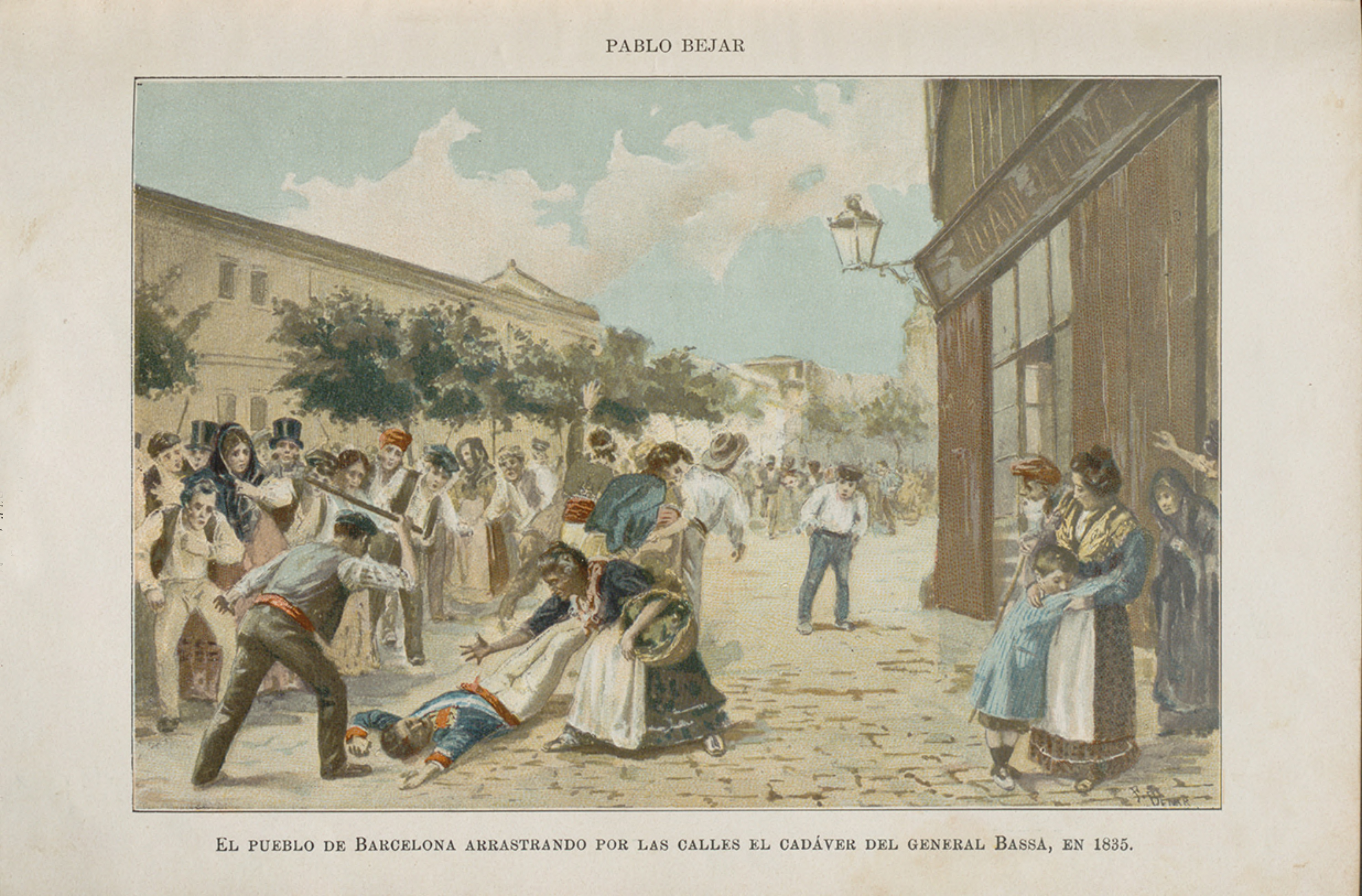
Lynching of General Bassa on the streets of Barcelona

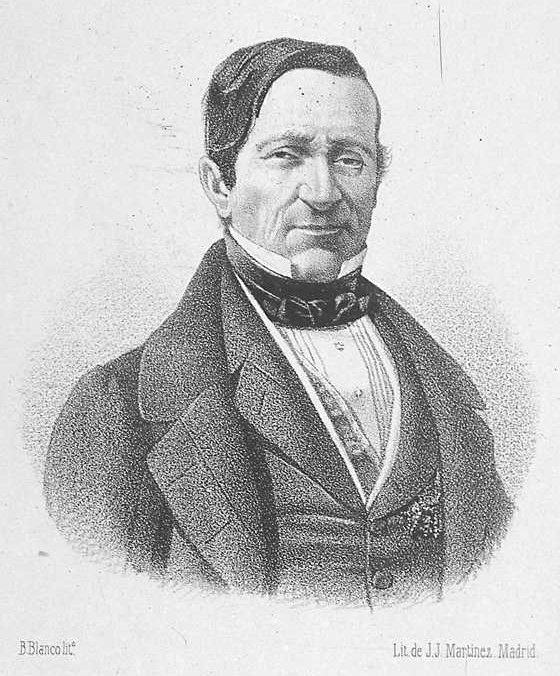
Manuel Llauder, captain general of Catalonia at the time of the bullangas of the summer of 1835.

After the riot of July 25 and the early morning of July 26, calm did not return to Barcelona. One of those responsible was Captain General Manuel Llauder who stirred up the most radical sector of the liberals and the popular strata when in a fleeting appearance in Barcelona he published a proclamation in which he threatened to punish those guilty of the assaults on the convents. On August 5, events were precipitated when the new military governor of Barcelona, General Bassa, was assassinated by rioters, without the urban militia or the troops doing anything to defend him. Then his corpse was thrown from a balcony, dragged through the streets and burned. The statue of Fernando VII that had been placed in the Plaza del Palau by the previous captain general, the Count of Spain, was also destroyed, and the consumption booths were also burned. The next day the factory El Vapor, recently installed in Tallers street by the company Bonaplata, Vilaregut, Rull y Cía. It seems that the factory fire was an act of "ludismo" as an observer of the time warned in an article that appeared in El Vapor six months later: "I do not know that in the popular movements the plebs go to the treasuries or bank houses, doing it very often to the production establishments whose machines make personal work unnecessary". This is also confirmed by the report written by the military governor of Barcelona, General Pastor, about what happened:

The authorities, upon learning that the rioters were attempting this attack, sent all the force they could muster, in order to stop the fire; but to no avail, because they were determined to do so, convinced that the looms moved by machines diminished the production of manual labor. The owners of the factory, who had been fearful of this attack for days, had been forewarned by a guard of their own employees, who prematurely set fire to the rioters, which exasperated them and increased their insolence. The troop that was to contain them got in the way and as a result of the scuffle several were killed and wounded, leaving the camp for the besiegers. The flames of this fire somewhat injured the tobacco factory, which fortunately, and with the help of construction workers, could be saved, but not five or eight small houses, attached to the same factory, which were burned.

The liberal press of Barcelona, such as El Brusi, El Catalán and El Vapor, which had scarcely reported the anticlerical riot of July 25, on the other hand, did report extensively on the fire at the Bonaplata factory, condemning the event. This would prove, according to Antonio Moliner Molina, "that they looked favorably on the attacks on the convents".

=== "Bullangues" in the rest of Catalonia ===
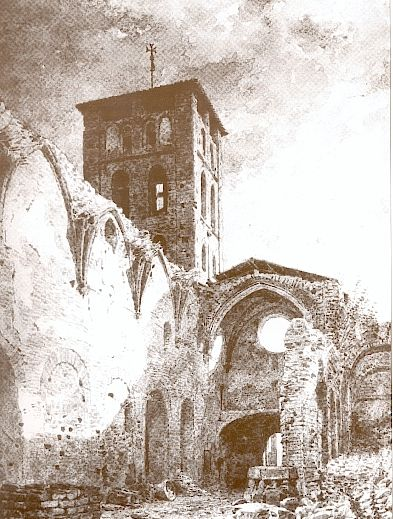
Church of the monastery of Santa Maria de Ripoll after the "bullangues" of the summer of 1835.

The news of the Reus riot spread quickly. "In Valls there were no murders because the mayor, J. Tell, prevented it with a detachment of "mossos d'Esquadra". In Vila-seca the attacks of the crowd were directed against the properties belonging to the cathedral chapter of Tarragona and the archdeacon of that town, which were looted on August 6. (...) Many religious abandoned the convents and took refuge in private houses or in the mountains. Thus the friars of Riudoms, the Carmelites and Augustinians of La Selva, the Franciscans of Alcover and Escornalbou, the Carthusians of Scala Dei and the Cistercians of Poblet managed to save themselves. However, on July 23rd the convent of Riudoms was set on fire, on the 25th that of Scala Dei and days later that of Poblet".

In Tarragona on July 27 Archbishop Echanove was attacked and managed to take refuge in an English frigate where he stayed for three days, finally managing to transfer to another ship that took him to Mallorca and, not being safe there either, he disembarked in Mahón on August 4. In a letter he addressed to Pope Gregory XVI, he exposed the atmosphere of hostility towards the clergy in Tarragona:

...since the multitude of anarchists and assassins (...) were preparing to attack the threatened beheading of the archbishop and then that of the canons (...) Insults, mockery, threats and other mistreatments were lavished on the clergy, not excepting myself. The most horrendous blasphemies and ungodly contempt were frequent and public. The temples of the Lord were profaned, turning them into fortifications for the defense of the regular troops of the so-called migueletes and urbans.

"Days after the fires in Barcelona, other convents in Catalonia were assaulted and set on fire, such as the Capuchin monasteries in Sabadell, Mataró, Arenys de Mar and Vilafranca del Penedès, the Hieronymites of El Valle de Hebron and Murtra, the Discalced Carmelites of Cardó, as well as the Carthusian monasteries of Montalegre and Scala Dei, the Benedictines of Sant Cugat and Santa Maria de Ripoll and the Cistercians of Poblet and Santes Creus. Nor was the monastery of Montserrat spared from being sacked after the monks abandoned it on July 30."

"In total 22 religious and 8 secular priests were killed, which added to those killed previously in Reus and Barcelona amount to 67, distributed as follows: 3 Benedictines, 2 Carthusians, 2 Trinitarians Calzados, 3 Carmelites, 18 Franciscans, 4 Dominicans, 3 Mercedarians, 5 Augustinians, 1 Capuchin, 12 Discalced Carmelites, 1 Discalced Trinitarian, 1 Pauline, 4 from other religious orders and 8 priests. During the first days of August several anti-clerical uprisings were repeated in Murcia. As a result of such persecution and violence against the religious, and to a lesser degree against the priests, some parish priests abandoned the churches of their towns and sought safe refuge in other places".

== Consequences ==
=== Exclaustration and confiscation ===
As a consequence of the liberal revolts and the anti-clerical riots of the summer of 1835, the regent María Cristina de Borbón-Dos Sicilias was forced to remove the Count of Toreno from the presidency of the Council of Ministers and to replace him in September by the progressive liberal Juan Álvarez Mendizábal, whose government suppressed the religious orders by a royal decree of March 8, 1836, and seized and sold their goods in the confiscation that bears his name.

This is how A. Fernandez de los Rios recounted the exclaustration that Salustiano Olózaga led in Madrid twenty years later:

The operation was done with great ease: most of the friars were dressed in profane clothes, and few asked for company to leave the convents, of which they left with the alacrity of those who had the move arranged and organized in advance. At eleven o'clock in the morning, all the mayors had given report of having fulfilled the first end of their mission, that of vacating the convents: Don Manuel Cantero, who exercised the functions of mayor, was the only one of whom nothing was known. Olózaga wrote him these lines: "Everyone has already reported having dispatched except you". Cantero replied: "The others have only had to dress them; I have to shave them. Cantero was right: in his district there were one hundred and so many Capuchins of Patience.

Julio Caro Baroja has drawn attention to the figure of the old exclaustrated friar, because unlike the young man who worked wherever he could or joined the Carlist ranks -or that of the national militiamen-, he lived "enduring his misery, emaciated, weakened, giving Latin classes in schools, or doing other poorly paid jobs". Thus, as Julio Caro Baroja has pointed out, in addition to the economic ones, the suppression of the religious orders had "enormous consequences in the social history of Spain". Caro Baroja quotes the progressive liberal Fermín Caballero who in 1837, shortly after the exclaustration, wrote:

The total extinction of the religious orders is the most gigantic step we have taken in the present era; it is the true act of reform and revolution. The present generation is surprised not to find anywhere the chapels and habits that it has seen since childhood, of such varied forms and shades as the names of the Benedictines, Geronimos, Mostenses, Basilians, Franciscans, Capuchins, Gilitos, etc., were multiplied, but our successors will no less admire the transformation, when traditionally only through books they know what the friars were and how they ended up, and when to learn about their costumes they have to go to the prints or museums! Then they will really offer novelty and interest in the tables El diablo predicador, La fuerza del sino and other dramatic compositions in which friars are involved!"

The social consequences of the disentailment can also be seen in the change in the external appearance of the cities, which was "laified" -a term used by Julio Caro Baroja-. Madrid, for example, was no longer "choked by a chain of convents" due to Salustiano Olózaga, governor of the capital, who ordered the demolition of seventeen convents.

As soon as the objectives programmed by the liberals in religious matters -exclaustration of the regulars and confiscation of their goods- were achieved, the " anti-clerical cycle" initiated with the massacre of the friars in Madrid in 1834 came to an end.

== See also ==
- 1834 massacre of friars in Madrid

== Bibliography ==
- Caro Baroja, Julio (2008) [1980]. Historia del anticlericalismo español (in Spanish). Madrid: Caro Raggio. ISBN 978-84-7035-188-4.
- Carr, Raymond (1982). Spain 1808-1975. Oxford History of Modern Europe (2 ed.). Oxford: Clarendon Press. ISBN 0198221282.
- Fontana, Josep (2003). La revolució liberal a Catalunya (in Catalan). Lleida: Eumo Editorial-Pagès Editors. ISBN 84-9779-006-5.
- Moliner Prada, Antonio (1998). "Anticlericalismo y revolución liberal". El anticlericalismo español contemporáneo (in Spanish) (La Parra López, Emilio and Suárez Cortina, Manuel ed.). Madrid: Biblioteca Nueva. ISBN 84-7030-532-8.
- Pérez Garzón, Juan Sisinio (1997). "Curas y liberales en la revolución burguesa". El anticlericalismo (in Spanish) (Rafael Cruz ed.). Madrid: Marcial Pons (Journal Ayer, nº 27). ISBN 84-7248-505-6.
