= Monastery of Santa María de Aciveiro =

Monastery in Galicia, Spain

Coordinates: 42°37′03″N 8°18′06″W

- Mosteiro de Santa María de Aciveiro
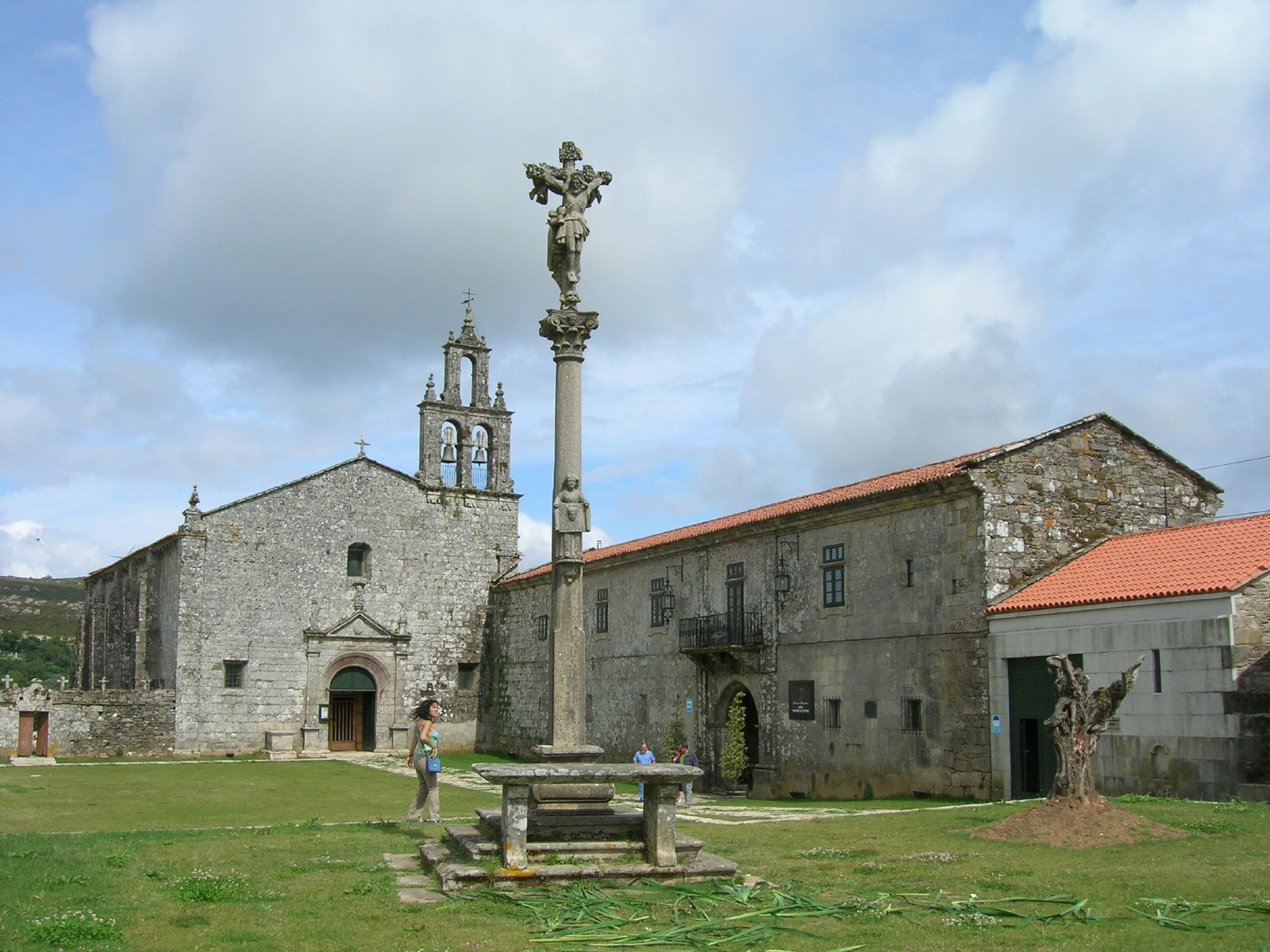

Religion
- Affiliation: Catholic Church
- Patron: Virgin Mary

Location
- Location: Forcarei, Galicia, Spain
- Interactive map of Monastery of Santa María de Aciveiro

The Monastery of Santa María de Aciveiro (Galician: Mosteiro de Santa María de Aciveiro) is a medieval monastery in Galicia, Spain. It was inhabited from its foundation in the 12th century until the exclaustration caused by the confiscation in 1842.

It was declared a Historical Monument (now known as Bien de Interés Cultural) in 1931.
