= Royal Basilica of Saint Francis the Great =

Roman Catholic church in Madrid, Spain

- Real Basílica de San Francisco el Grande
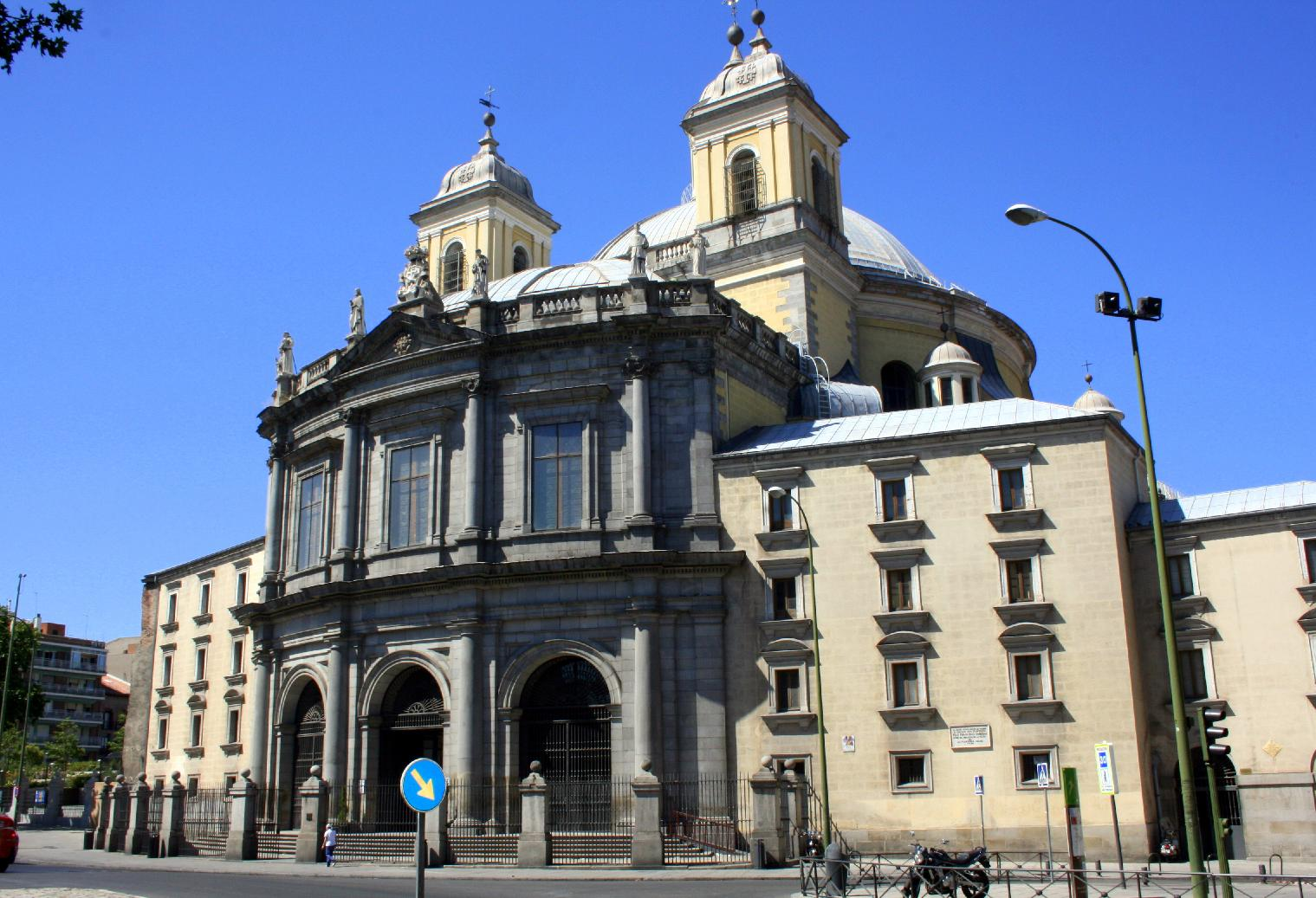
- Royal Basilica of Saint Francis the Great
- 40°24′38″N 3°42′52″W
- Address: Gran Vía de San Francisco, 19, Palacio, Madrid
- Country: Spain
- Denomination: Roman Catholic

History
- Status: Minor basilica (1963); Heritage: bien de interés cultural (1980)
- Dedication: Francis of Assisi

Architecture
- Functional status: Active
- Architects: Francisco Cabezas; Antonio Plo; Francesco Sabatini
- Architectural type: Church
- Style: Neoclassic
- Completed: 18th century (current church)

The Royal Basilica of Saint Francis the Great (Spanish: Real Basílica de San Francisco el Grande) is a Roman Catholic basilica in central Madrid, Spain, located in the neighborhood of Palacio.

== History ==
The main façade faces the Plaza of San Francisco, at the intersection of Bailén, the Gran Vía de San Francisco, and the Carrera de San Francisco. It forms part of the convent of Jesús y María of the Franciscan order. The convent was founded in the 13th century at the site of a chapel.

The building was erected on the plot previously occupied by a primitive Franciscan convent (according to tradition founded by the very same Francis of Assisi in 1217), demolished on the occasion upon orders by Charles III, who sought to build a new convent from scratch. It was designed in a Neoclassic style in the second half of the 18th century, based on a design by Francisco Cabezas, developed by Antonio Pló, and completed by Francesco Sabatini. The church contains many good paintings representing Spanish painting from the 17th to 19th century, including one by Zurbarán and one by Francisco Goya. The walls of the temple were painted in the 19th century. The temple once functioned as the National pantheon and enshrined the remains of famous artists and politicians. Today is an important tourism point.

The dome is 33 metres (108 ft) in diameter and 58 metres (190 ft) in height; its shape is very similar to the Pantheon's dome, having a more circular shape than the typical domes built in the 18th century. It is reportedly the fourth biggest dome in Europe after the Pantheon, St. Peter's Basilica and the Florence cathedral.

The temple was elevated to the status of minor basilica via an edict issued by John XXIII on 2 February 1963, the apostolic letter Gloria matriti.

In 1980, the building was designated a national historic-artistic monument (a heritage status predating in time that of the bien de interés cultural) by the Ministry of Culture.

== Bells ==
The church contains 19 bells, separated into two groups: the 8 change ringing bells which lie in the south tower, and the 11 chiming bells that lie in the north tower.

Although they are derelict and unringable, the church holds the only peal of change ringing bells in Spain, cast by John Warner and Sons in 1882, sounding in A♭, and weighing around 430 kg (950 lb). They are considered unringable because only bells 2, 4, and 6 have wheels. They were the only peal of change ringing church bells in mainland Europe until 2017, when St George's Church in Ypres received a peal of their own.

== Gallery ==
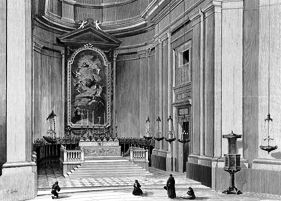
Interior in 1860

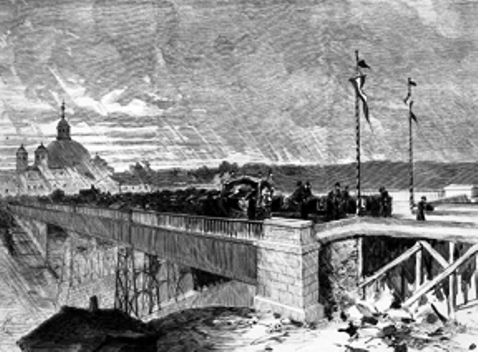
Print showing translation of the remains of Calderón de la Barca from the Royal Basilica of Saint Francis the Great to the cemetery of san Nicolás, by the original viaduct of the Segovia street, in 1874

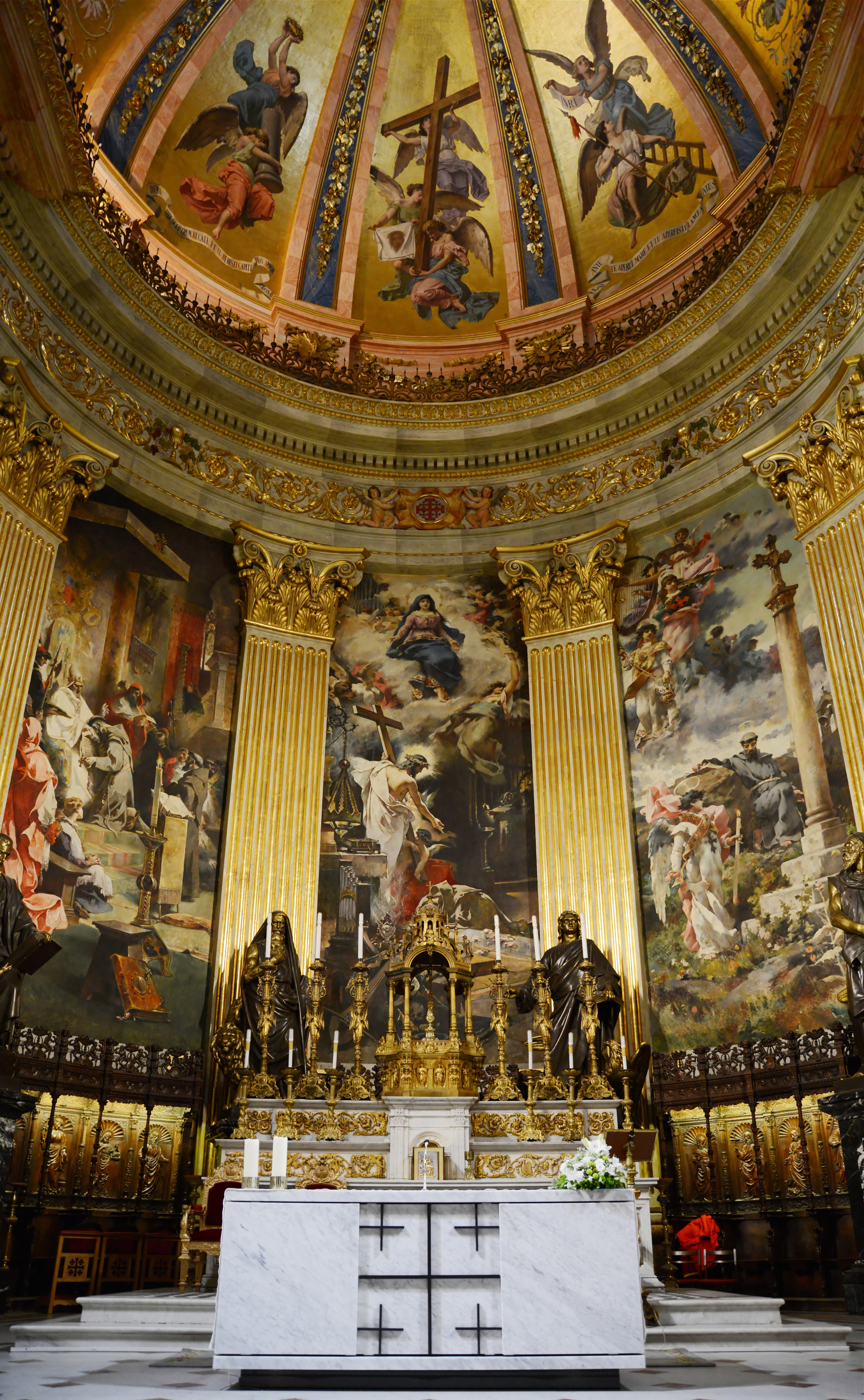
Altar

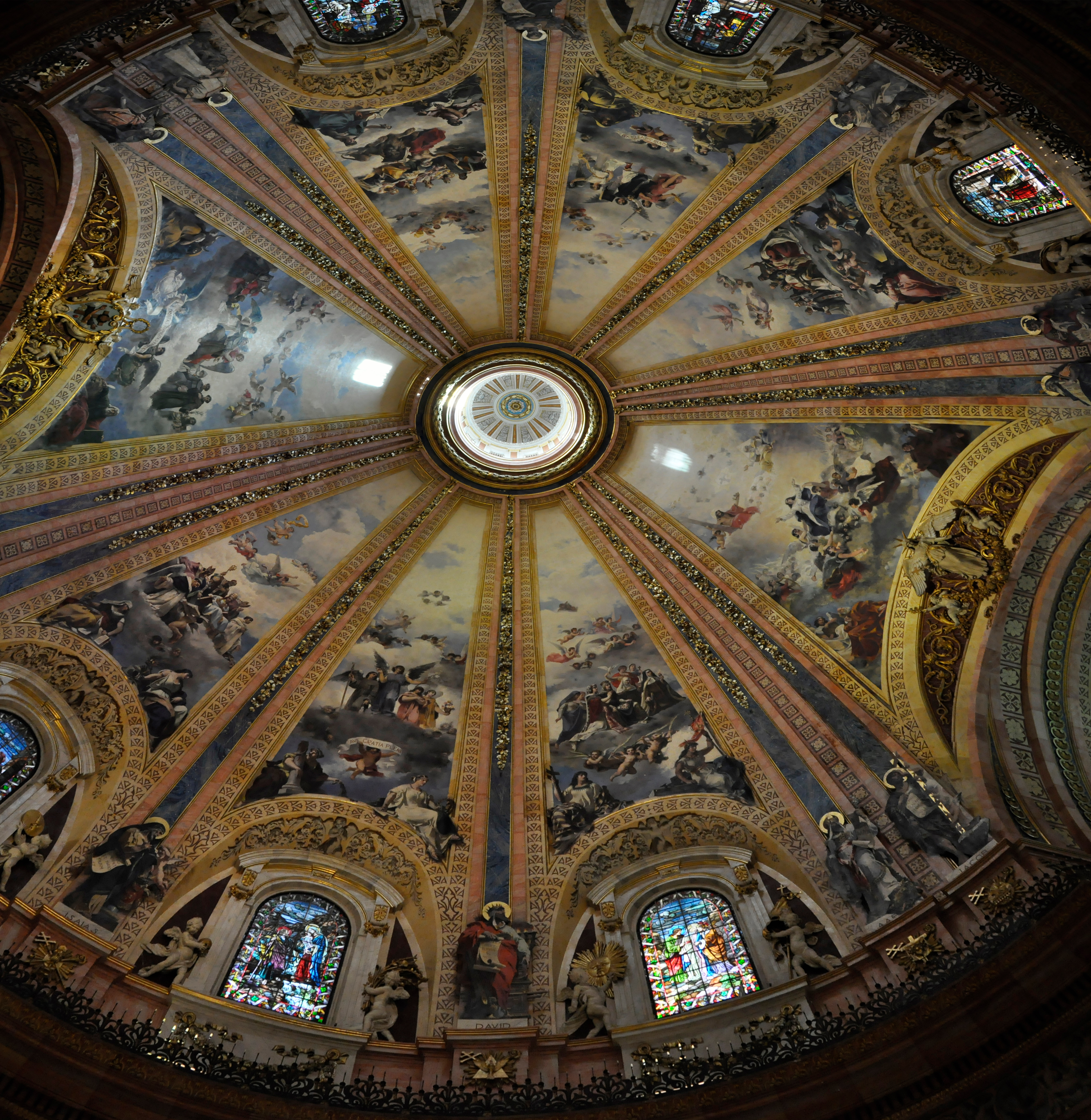
The great dome

== See also ==
- Catholic Church in Spain
- List of oldest church buildings
- 1834 massacre of friars in Madrid
