= Cholera epidemics in Spain =

Outbreaks of cholera in 19th-century Spain

A series of morbid cholera outbreaks occurred from the first third of the 19th century until the end of the same century in the large cities of Spain. In total, some 800,000 people died during the four pandemics that occurred in Spain during that century. However, cholera was one of several contagious diseases that struck the country. Suffice it to say that the Spanish population in 1800 was 11.5 million people and was characterized by a high birth and death rate. The successive pandemics that the country suffered caused an economic recession, as well as an opportunity for profound change in health and hygiene in Spain. It was not free of controversy, both for the use of the vaccines created by Jaime Ferrán y Clúa and for the ways of combating the disease, as well as for the policies used to deal with it. It is worth mentioning that the terror caused in the population, due to the deaths caused, was the cause of popular revolts and social instability.

Since the first outbreak in 1817, which occurred in India, it has been known as a pandemic disease. Its subsequent spread throughout successive European countries finally led to the appearance of the first cases in Spain. The first outbreak occurred in early 1833, in the port of Vigo, which was repeated almost simultaneously in southern Spain (Andalusia). The first outbreak arose in a conflictive and unstable political environment, in the midst of a severe political transition. The then very recent death of Ferdinand VII after the Ominous Decade left a weak and conflict-ridden state, the first outbreaks occurred during what would become the First Carlist War that was taking place in northern Spain. In 1884, Robert Koch discovered the origin of the disease in the form of a bacillus; the fight against its advance already had a scientific sense from that year on, however epidemic outbreaks appeared throughout the world. In the 20th century, there were only two outbreaks of cholera in Spain, in 1971 and 1979.

== Characteristics ==
Cholera is an infectious disease caused by enterotoxins of the bacillus Vibrio cholerae. The patients show a syndrome based on vomiting and excessive diarrhea (called cholerine) with watery stools with little or no fever, after an incubation period of one or two days. Death occurs from dehydration in less than a week. The disease is usually transmitted by water and food. When the outbreak becomes established in a population, it is the abundant stools (more than thirty times a day) that easily contaminate drinking water sources and the clothes of the affected persons. It spreads easily in humid areas, and its incidence is higher in countries with a warm climate.

The disease arrived in Europe between 1817 and 1823 from India. It struck various parts of Europe from this date onwards, and its victims numbered several million. Finally, on February 2, 1884, Dr. Robert Koch discovered the bacillus causing the disease in the feces of patients. Before this date, all cures were scientifically meaningless lucubrations, since many of the doctors were attached to the miasmatic theory. Many of the prophylactic activities were based on bloodletting, which due to its abundance produced deaths by exsanguination. Emollient and mucilaginous enemas were frequent. After Koch's discovery, Dr. Jaime Ferrán y Clúa tested a vaccine in Spain a year later, which was widely criticized by scientists and politicians. To this criticism contributed the Spaniard Santiago Ramón y Cajal, who denied the effectiveness of the method proposed by Jaime. Finally, the vaccine is not officially approved, and only until June 1919, at an international congress on hygiene held in Paris, it was finally accepted publicly.

At present, penicillins are not used for its cure: with a solution of tetracycline its effects are considerably reduced. The current treatment consists of rehydration of the patient with mineral salts, either intravenously or orally. Cholera disease seems to have disappeared in Europe and America at the end of the 19th century, and since 1950 only sporadic outbreaks have occurred in India and nearby countries such as Bangladesh. However, the World Health Organization (WHO) records new outbreaks every year in different parts of the world, generally in developing countries. Nevertheless, two new outbreaks appeared in Spain in the mid-twentieth century, which were relatively easily contained, and in which the number of victims was low, compared to the outbreaks of the 19th century.

== History ==
One of the characteristics of the initial evolution of cholera is that each infected country tried to solve the problem on its own, without requesting help from the rest and without taking any joint action or providing any information to other nations. In Spain, it happened in the same way. Infectious diseases are a common form of mortality, and at the beginning of the 20th century, deaths from infectious diseases still accounted for almost a quarter of all deaths. Cholera was one of the most feared by society, but it was not the only one that plagued the country: yellow fever and smallpox were examples. The mortality from the different outbreaks caused about 300 000 deaths in the period 1833–1834, about 236 000 deaths in 1854–1855, about 120 000 in 1865 and another 120 000 in 1885. It can be seen that the last outbreak occurred when the cause of the disease was already known. Cholera affected in its various outbreaks mainly the eastern half of the Iberian Peninsula, and particularly the densely populated urban centers on the coast and some of them also in the interior. Since the disease appeared in Great Britain in 1832, there was concern in Spain about its origin, prevention and treatment. However, since the etiology of the disease was unknown, preventive actions were trials without any scientific basis.

=== First measures ===
The administration took preventive measures to stop the advance of the disease, believing in the classic epidemic theories of the time. Dr. Pedro Castelló obtained from Fernando VII the authorization to send, in February 1832, a medical commission composed of Pedro María Rubio, Lorenzo Sánchez Núñez and Francisco Paula y Folch, in order to study the effects of cholera in cities such as Paris, Vienna and Munich. The result of their trip was the report sent from Berlin on May 31, 1833, which was not published until 1834. The appearance of the first outbreak in the peninsula from 1832 onwards was a question of time. Some of the measures were based on the creation of sanitary cordons, quarantines in the lazarettos, sectorized isolation of the population, and the establishment of hospitals. The hygienic conditions of some populated cities were improved, cleaning the streets more frequently. A Plan for the Cure of Morbid Cholera was published. The first controversy arose when the cords began to be applied to certain segments of the population: some doctors did not agree with the application of cords because of their dubious efficiency, besides the fact that they paralyzed economic activities. Some physicians, however, agreed with the measures and adopted them at their own discretion in the absence of a central health authority.

At this time in the 19th century, cholera was considered an epidemic disease, not at all contagious, and therefore it was thought that the best course of action was to have good hygiene in order not to get it. The Plan for the Cure of Morbid Cholera gave numerous indications in this respect. It was mentioned that the main cause of cholera resided in the atmosphere itself. Prophylactic actions were carried out, such as taking the sale of fruits and vegetables out of the cities. Local Health Boards were established. The main pathogenic theories on morbidity were nervous, spasmodic, humoral and gastroenteric or inflammatory. One of the doctors who stood out in the first outbreaks was the hygienist Mateo Seoane Sobral, who published several articles on the evolution of pandemics in Europe, compiling the experiences of other countries in the treatment of the disease. In the same way, the precursor of Spanish epidemiology, Nicasio Landa y Álvarez de Carvallo carried out numerous statistical studies (medical topography, incidence rates, lethality rates, etc.) that allow studying the evolution of the disease today, especially those corresponding to the second outbreak of 1855.

=== First outbreak ===
Nine months had passed since cholera had arrived in Paris, and a year and a half since it had arrived in England, and the Spanish and Portuguese authorities knew that it was only a matter of time before the first outbreak appeared on the peninsula. The first cases of the disease occurred in the city of Vigo, in January 1833. The first affected person was named Francisco Conde, and lived in the vicinity of the Vigo arsenal. In Barcelona, an outbreak occurred almost simultaneously. The outbreak started due to the landing of combat troops from the Portuguese War of Succession; it is possible that they were responsible for their arrival in Spain, and it was in Andalusia where the most deadly cases occurred in the summer of that same year. The arrival of winter slowed the advance of the pandemic throughout the country, and when spring arrived, the disease reached Madrid in a second advance. From Vigo it spread to Pontevedra, and was isolated in that area of Galicia. Other stories mention that the disease came aboard the steamship Isabel la Católica, which came from Greece; in it, three sick people were traveling and were isolated in the corresponding lazaretto. However, days later cases appeared in Redondela, Tuy, Vigo, Pontevedra and in almost all the towns of the province.

The outbreak in southern Spain was more virulent, and spread with great force due to environmental conditions, reaching Madrid, Toledo, Guadalajara, Soria, Avila, Burgos and Cuenca. In the capital, already in July 1834, the terror of the disease was of such intensity that there were massacres of friars, accused of causing the disease by poisoning the water. The event was reported in the local press. Everyone began to be suspected, the water carriers, the pharmacists, the doctors. The number of complaints of people suspected of contaminating the water multiplied.

There was a third route of entry of the cholera of 1834 through the Mediterranean, the Balearic Islands and Tarragona. One of the causes was the French ship Triton, which had left Toulon with soldiers of the foreign legion on a long voyage that included Oran and Algiers. Cases of cholera on the ship began as soon as it left Toulon and, despite quarantining and sanitizing with lime, the ship spread cholera to the cities where it stopped, such as Tarragona and Roses. This first epidemic affected some 1,394 towns, the last province affected was Cáceres and the last town was Ceclavín. The epidemic lasted a total of one year, five months and twenty-two days. From the first outbreak almost 300,000 people were affected, three percent of the population.

=== Successive outbreaks ===
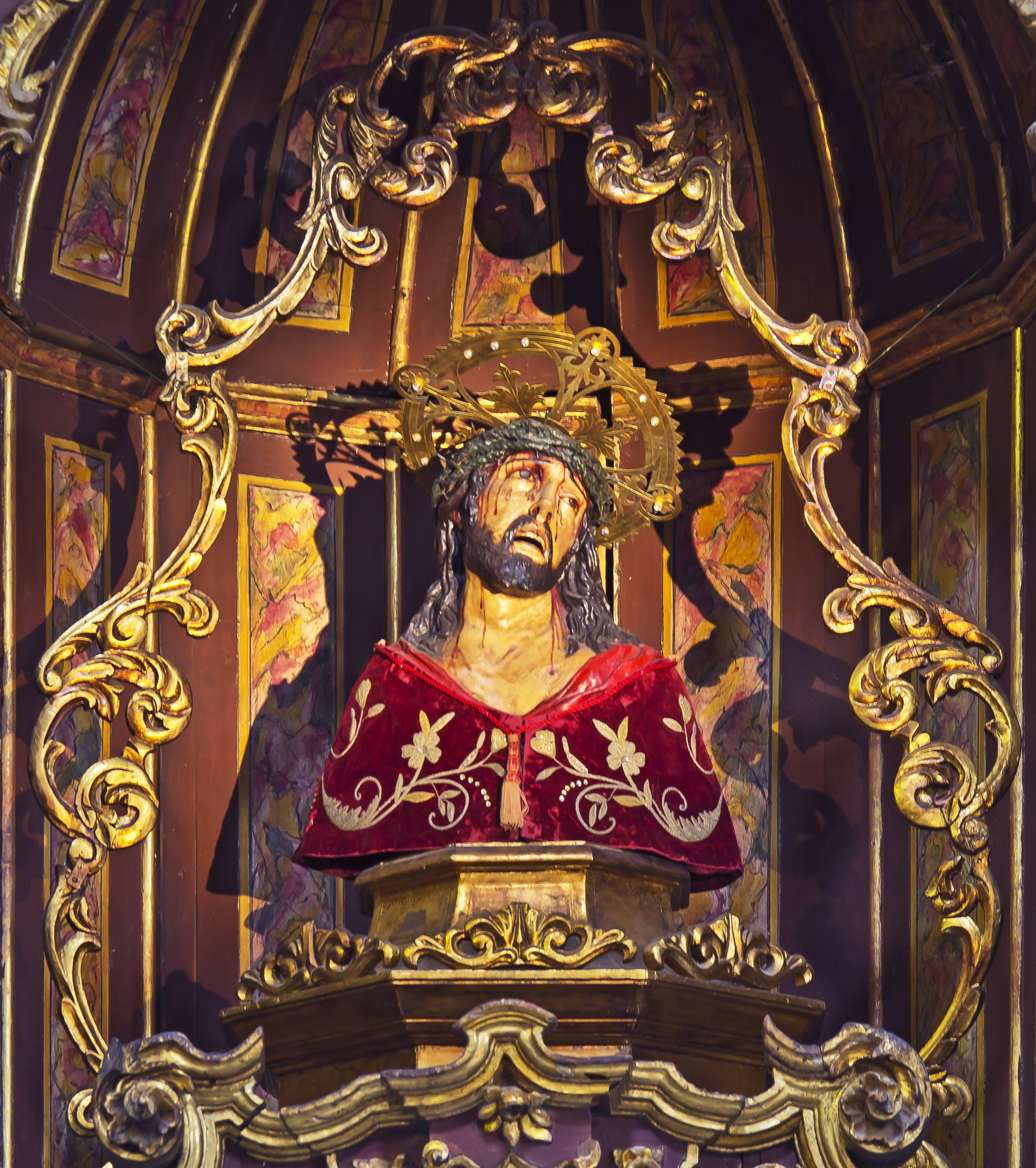
Señor de las Tribulaciones, image to which was attributed the end of the cholera-morbo-Asiatic cholera in Santa Cruz de Tenerife, in 1893.

On November 19, 1853, the disease returned to the port of Vigo, through the steamship Isabel La Católica. The ship and its crew remained in quarantine in the lazaretto on the island of San Simón, from where the pathology gradually spread throughout the Rías Bajas. At first, the outbreak only affected the lower classes, but it became increasingly virulent, and in 1854 it spread throughout La Coruña, causing three thousand deaths, according to an estimate by the doctor and mayor of La Coruña, Narciso Pérez Reoyo.

The epidemic of 1855 affected large areas of the interior. This second outbreak is the most documented by the press of the time and the one with the greatest impact on the memory of those affected. It is possible to think that one out of every nineteen Spaniards was affected in the second epidemic. Although it was not the most deadly of the cholera outbreaks that occurred in Spain in the 19th century, it was devastating because of the consequences generated by its fear. All this despite the fact that the modes of transmission of the infection among the population were already beginning to be suspected and an incipient international network of health posts was being coordinated to provide regular information on the evolution and situation of the disease. In some cities, such as Madrid, the water communication and sanitation system was renewed, creating the Isabel II Canal. Epidemic outbreaks appeared successively in the Spanish provinces. This outbreak attacked with greater virulence the lower classes, especially the emerging working classes.

Worldwide, the next pandemic emerged in 1863 and lasted until 1873. In 1865, cholera entered Spain through the port of Valencia, and the most affected provinces were Valencia, Palma de Mallorca, Gerona, León, Albacete, Huesca and Teruel. Dr. Antonio Fernández García did a commendable job of data collection. In Spain, political changes had occurred during the period from 1855 to 1865.

In 1885, a great cholera epidemic affected about 5000 people, of whom 50 percent died, in the province of Jaén. It arrived preceded by some catastrophic phenomena, such as earthquakes and torrential rains, which created the ground for the epidemic to develop. It arrived from the Levant, through the province of Granada. In July 1885, it was already affecting towns such as Villacarrillo, Torreperogil, Cazorla, Arjonilla and Baeza. Although the first case was registered in Jaén on August 13, a month earlier there were deaths caused by enterocolitis, a diagnosis that can be interpreted as a euphemism for cholera when the disease is not declared. The total number of fatalities in the capital was 611, similar to that of the 1855 epidemic, but lower, percentage-wise; in any case, much higher than that of the national total.

One of the last most virulent outbreaks occurred in 1893 in the Canary Islands. On October 11 of that year, the Italian ship Remo docked in Santa Cruz de Tenerife; it arrived from Rio Grande, on its way to Genoa. The isolation measures failed, which caused an epidemic of Asian-morbid-cholera to spread throughout the city and neighboring municipalities. Alarm spread to the other islands, which were immediately cut off from the island of Tenerife. Religious rogatory processions were carried out through the streets of the city, such as the Señor de las Tribulaciones (Lord of Tribulations). The attitude of the people of Santa Cruz during the epidemic earned the city the title of "Very Beneficent" and the Cross of First Class of the Spanish Order of Beneficence. It is estimated that 1,744 citizens were affected by the disease (8.84% of the population), of whom 382 died (21.90%).

=== Outbreaks in the 20th century ===
In the 20th century, the use of anti-cholera vaccines became regularized and the approach to the disease became known. There was progress in the development of vaccines and antibiotics. In spite of everything, there was an epidemic outbreak of cholera in the middle of Franco's regime, and the focus was located on the banks of the Jalón river; this occurred in July 1971. Later, there was another outbreak in 1979.

== Social effects ==
The cholera pandemics, and especially that of 1885, have been extensively studied, including their therapeutic dimensions. The controversies about the possible scientific treatments, the discussions about the most effective ones, all of them were of great importance and created social alarm. It is worth mentioning Ferran's vaccination and the national controversy unleashed around it. In any case, the social controversy was found in the frequent miraculous treatments. There was no shortage of healers who cured by means of prayers, magic words and signs. The multitude of ways of pretending to cure the disease depended fundamentally on the etiopathogenic doctrines held by the physicians of the time. As a prophylactic, quinine sulfate, camphor, and benzoic acid were recommended; other remedies were cinnabar cigar, a mineral rich in mercury, and charcoal smoke.

The level of destitution in the cities was high; since the end of the 18th century, the number of people in such conditions in the big cities did not stop growing. It was this social group that led popular revolts, some directed against the Church and others against other hierarchical bodies of power. Riots broke out in the big cities. Their lifestyle, lacking hygiene, food and basic means, made them one of the targets of the disease. Cities and towns became isolated and suffered from access controls. Walled cities used the walls as a "barrier of access". Suspects were taken to the lazarettos. The Carlist Wars, with their consequent movement of troops, contributed to the spread of cholera epidemics. The terror caused by the disease caused the cholera outbreak of 1865 to empty cities such as Madrid and Burgos. A large percentage of the population was displaced, leaving their businesses abandoned and the cities depopulated. The effect on the economy was felt in subsequent decades. After each outbreak, the fields were abandoned and were followed by periods of famine that affected large groups of the population.

Prior to these epidemics, cemeteries in Spain were commonly situated in the central areas of cities, frequently in proximity to hospitals and, in some cases, people were buried inside of church buildings. The high mortality rates associated with the outbreaks necessitated the relocation of burial grounds from urban centers to peripheral areas. In many instances, cemeteries were transferred from locations within the city walls to sites situated beyond them. In many cemeteries, "family" graves were kept open, waiting for new deaths among close relatives to cover them when they were full. After the first outbreaks, rare was the city that did not have cemeteries located "on the outskirts"; at present, some of the popular cemeteries are located on the outskirts, and date from the beginning of the 20th century.

== See also ==
- 1834 massacre of friars in Madrid
- Anti-clerical riots of 1835
