= Adolfo Rivadeneyra =

Spanish diplomat and editor

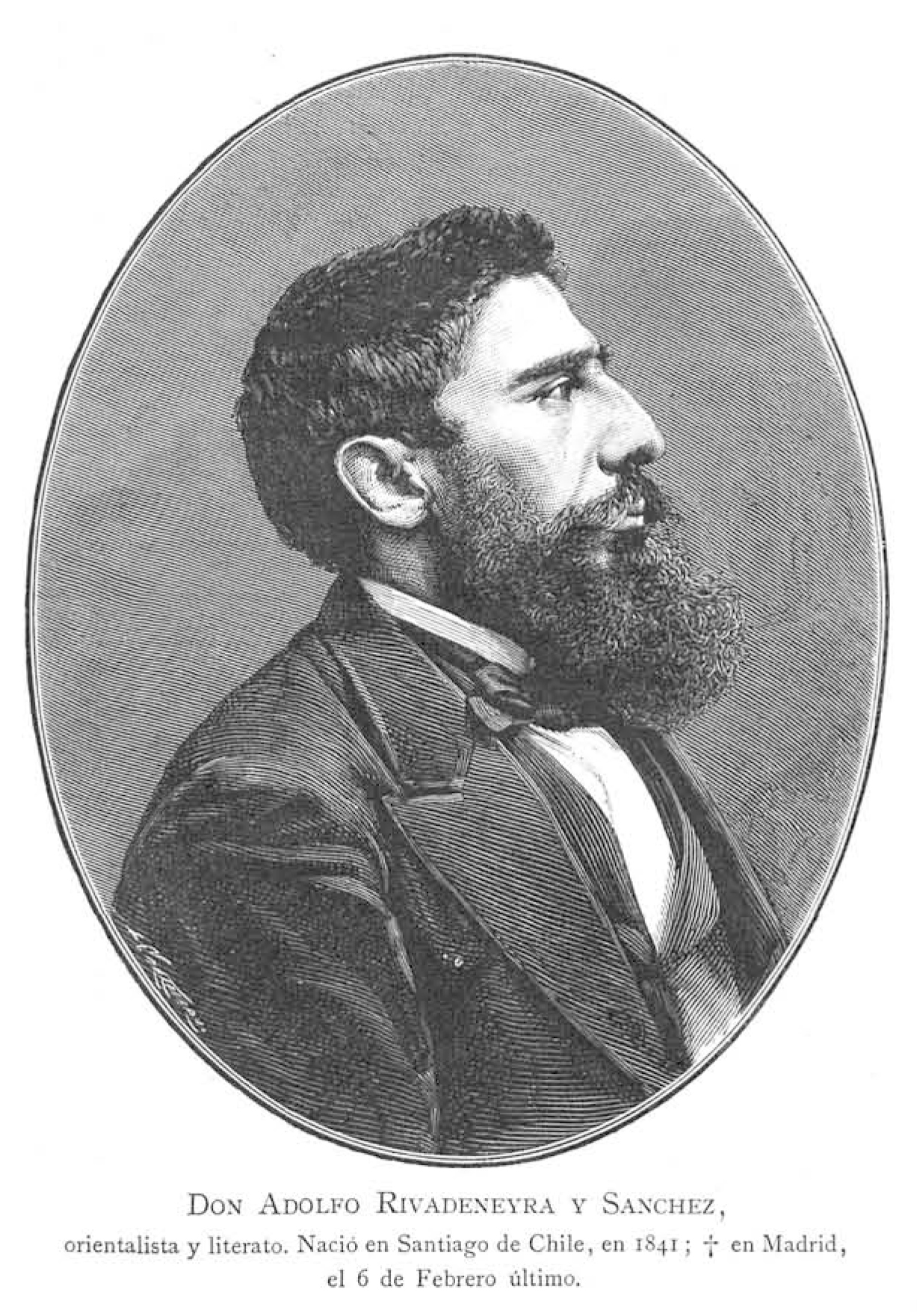
Adolfo Rivadeneyra's Portrait

Adolfo Rivadeneyra (April 10, 1841 in Santiago de Chile – February 5, 1882 in Madrid) was a Spanish diplomat, orientalist, editor and traveler.

== Biography ==
Son of the renowned Catalan printer and publisher Manuel Rivadeneyra (es:Manuel Rivadaneyra), Adolfo began his diplomatic career in Beirut as a multilingual interpreter (he spoke fluent English, French, Italian, German, Persian, Turkish and several dialects of Arabic), became Acting Consul in Jerusalem, vice-consul in Ceylon, Damascus, and Tehran, and subsequently was consul in Mogador and Singapore, where he ended his career in the Foreign Service in 1879.

He actively participated in the Spanish cultural world of his time and was elected to the Royal Academy of History and appointed secretary of the Geographical Society of Madrid. In Damascus he began studying Assyrian with the help of his teacher and friend Francisco García Ayuso.

As publisher, Adolfo Rivadeneyra continued to publish the series of classics of Spanish literature, entitled Biblioteca de Autores Españoles, started by his father. In addition, he related his extensive travels throughout the East in several books.

== Works ==
- Viaje de Ceylan a Damasco. Golfo Pérsico. Mesopotamia. Ruinas de Babilonia, Nínive y Palmira, Madrid, 1871. Modern editions: De Ceilán a Damasco, 1986, Barcelona, Laertes; Viaje de Ceilán a Damasco : Golfo Pérsico, Mesopotamia, ruinas de Babilonia, Nínive y Palmira, y cartas sobre la Siria y la isla de Ceilán de Adolfo Rivadeneyra; edición, prólogo y notas de Fernando Escribano Martín. Madrid: Miraguano. 2006. ISBN 84-7813-299-6.
- Viaje al interior de Persia, Madrid, Imprenta y Esterotipia de Aribau y Cª (Sucesores de Rivadeneyra), 3 tomos, 1880.

== Bibliography ==
- Rivadeneyra, Adolfo (2008). Escribano Fernando Martín (ed.). Viaje al interior de Persia . Miraguano Ediciones. ISBN 978-84-7813-322-2.
