= Murtra =

Murtra is a surname. Notable people with the surname include:

- Enrique Low Murtra (1939–1991), Colombian lawyer and politician
- Marc Murtra (born 1972), British-born, Spanish engineer and businessman
