= Exclaustration =

Catholic canon law procedure for a religious to live outside their institute

In the canon law of the Catholic Church, exclaustration is the official authorization for a member of a religious order (known as a religious) bound by perpetual vows to live for a limited time outside their religious institute, usually with a view to discerning whether to depart definitively.

== Distinctions ==
Exclaustration is distinguished from permission to live outside of a religious community for purposes such as caring for a parent or for reasons of work or study. The religious who in such circumstances is forced to be absent physically does not wish to separate even temporarily from the institute.

Exclaustration is distinguished also from dispensation from religious vows. The exclaustrated religious remains a religious and remains bound by those vows, although the manner of exercising poverty and obedience is altered in view of the changed circumstances.

A religious bound by temporary vows may for a grave reason be authorized to live in the secular world to discern their vocation. This is not intended to be seen as a trial period before seeking an indult (permission to be excepted from a particular norm of church law) of departure; an indult of departure and exclaustration are seen as two different requests. Unless the religious rejects it, an indult of departure entails dispensation from the religious vows that have been taken.

== Clergy ==
If the religious who is to be exclaustrated is a deacon or priest, he must first obtain the consent of the local ordinary (diocesan bishop or the equivalent in law of a diocesan bishop, such as an apostolic prefect) of the place where he intends to reside. Such residence may serve as a first step towards incardination into the jurisdiction of the ordinary. Agreement must be made with the local ordinary about any exercise of sacred ministry by the religious during the period of exclaustration.

=== Experimental and qualified exclaustration ===
In addition to ordinary or simple exclaustration, the Holy See, but not the religious superior or the diocesan bishop, may grant what has been called an exclaustration ad experimentum to a religious priest who has definitively decided to leave his institute and become a diocesan priest and who has found a diocesan bishop willing to accept him on a trial basis. This has the additional effect that he will be automatically released from his religious vows and incardinated into the diocese when the bishop decides to accept him definitively or, provided the bishop has not rejected him before then, at the close of a five-year trial period.

If a diocesan bishop is willing to incardinate a religious priest immediately, there is no need for exclaustration, and secularization (dispensation from the religious vows) is granted instead.

In certain situations where a religious priest does not intend to become a diocesan priest, the Holy See has sometimes granted what has been called "qualified exclaustration" at the religious priest's request, authorizing him to live for a limited time as a layman without exercising priestly faculties and free from all clerical obligations other than the enduring obligation of celibacy. This favour is granted only when there is reasonable hope that the petitioner will recover his priestly vocation.

It has been suggested that qualified exclaustration would be more accurately described not as an exclaustration but as a temporary laicization, and it has also been called "a mixture of exclaustration, secularization, and reduction to the lay state".

Qualified exclaustration was suggested as a possible solution when the Society of Jesus initially refused Robert Drinan, a Jesuit priest, permission to run for a seat in the United States Congress.

== Granting and imposing ==
Exclaustration for up to three years may be granted by the superior general of the institute, with the consent of the institute's council. Grants for more than three years or extension of an already granted exclaustration to beyond three years is reserved to the Holy See for institutes raised to the level of papal jurisdiction ("institutes of pontifical right") and to the diocesan bishop for institutes under diocesan jurisdiction ("institutes of diocesan right"). In the case of nuns, the granting of exclaustration even for a period shorter than three years was reserved to the Holy See until the promulgation of Cor Orans. Cor Orans specifies ″the Major Superior, with the consent of her Council, can grant the indult of exclaustration to a nun professed with solemn vows, for not more than a year, after the consent of the Ordinary of the place where the nun will have to live, and after having heard the opinion of the diocesan Bishop or of the competent religious Ordinary.″

Apart from being granted at the request of the religious concerned, exclaustration may also, at the request of the superior general with the consent of the council, be imposed for grave reasons by the Holy See in the case of institutes of pontifical right and by the diocesan bishop in the case of institutes of diocesan right. The authority imposing the exclaustration is thus outside the religious institute and may impose it either for a fixed period or indefinitely. In the latter case the exclaustration ends only when lifted by the authority that imposed it.
