= Jaff (name) =

The name Jaff is of Arabic origin, and related to the Jaff tribe.

== Given name ==
- Jaff Decker (born 1990) American baseball player

== Surname ==
- Ahmed Mukhtar Jaff (Born 1898-1934) Iraqi politician
- Akram Hamid Begzadeh Jaff (14 July 1929 – 21 November 2010) Kurdish politician from iraq
- Hanna Jaff (Born November 4, 1986) Mexican-American personality television
- Jennifer Jaff (Born June 12, 1957 – September 14, 2012) American advocate
- Lady Adela Jaff (Born 1847-1924) Princess of the Jaff tribe
- Milan Jaff (Born 2000) Kurdish rapper and criminal
- Mohamed Pasha Jaff (born 1714) is a Kurdish ruler
- Osman Pasha Jaff Is Ottoman ruler
- Tara Jaff (Born 1958 in Baghdad, Iraq) Is a Kurdish musician singer, and harpist
