= List of Kurdish historical sites =

This article briefly introduces a list of Kurds' historical sites (Kurmanji Kurdish: Asewarîyên dîrokî yên Kurdan, Sorani Kurdish: ئاسەواری مێژوویی کوردان, romanized: Asewarî mêjûyî Kurdan). Apart from Kurdish historical sites within Kurdistan, Kurdish sites outside of Kurdistan are also included.

== Sites in Iran and Eastern Kurdistan ==
- Dar ul-Ihsan Mosque, Sanandaj, built in 1812 by Amanollah Khan Ardalan.
- Khan Bathhouse, Sanandaj, built in 1805 by Amanollah Khan Ardalan.
- Gheshlagh Bridge, Sanandaj, built in 1636 by Suleiman Khan Ardalan.
- Khosro Abad Mansion, Sanandaj, built in 1808 by Amanollah Khan Ardalan.
- Kashkan Bridge, Lorestan Province, built in 1009 by Badr ibn Hasanwayh.
- Mofakham's House of Mirrors, Bojnord, built in the 1870s by the order of Sardar Mofkham
- Tagh-e Tavileh complex in Izeh, it was built by the Hazaraspid rulers in the Ilkhanate period.
- Sardar Castle in Bukan, it was built by Aziz Khan Mokri in 1868.
- Dimdim Castle, West Azarbaijan Province.

== Sites in Southern Kurdistan ==
- Pira Delal
- Lalish Temple, Located in Nineveh, Iraq, the temple is considered a sacred place of worship for the Yezidi Kurds.
- Hawler Citadel
- Shamame Tower, Rawanduz, built by Muhammad Pasha of Soran in 1813 to guard Rawanduz.
- Dere castle, Erbil, built in the 19th century by Muhammad Pasha of Soran.
- Dwin Castle, said to have belonged to the family of Sultan Saladin
- Sharfadin Temple in Sinjar, built over 800 years ago. It is considered by Yazidis as one of the holiest places on earth.
- Xanzad Castle east of Erbil, it was built in the 16th century by Mir Xanzad.
- Duhok Grand Mosque, built in 1684 by Abubakir Khwaja Muhammed Amedî.
- Amedi minaret, built in the 16th century by Sultan Hussein Wali of Bahdinan.
- Mîra graveyard, the Tombs and graves of members of the Bahdinan dynasty are located here.
- Shirwanah Castle, Kalar, built by Mohamed Pasha Jaff. the castle is the ancestral home of the Jaff family.

== Sites in Northern Kurdistan ==
- Alaca bridge, built by the orders of Mir Muhammed Pır Bela in 1674.
- Khan al-Barur in Harran, built by the Ayyubids in 1220.
- Cemilpaşazade mansion, built in 1882.
- Ishak Pasha Palace, construction started in 1685 by Colak Abdi Pasha and finished in 1785 under Ishak pasha.
- Hoşap Castle in Güzelsu, built in 1649 by Sarı Süleyman Bey.
- Harran Castle, it is an ancient castle built by the Byzantines, but most of the present structure dates to the Ayyubids in 1200.
- Hoşap bridge, built in 1671 by Zeynel Bey Mahmudi.
- Red madrasah in Cizre, built in 1501 by Mir Sharafkhan after he recaptured the city from the Aq Qoyunlu.
- Broken minaret in Silvan, built in the 13th century during the Ayyubid rule.
- Tekke mosque in Kilils, built by Canpolat bey in 1553.
- El-rizk mosque in Hasankeyf, built in 1409 by the Emirate of Hasankeyf ruler Ebu’l Mefahir Süleyman.
- Pira Dehderî Bridge, commissioned by Nizam al-Din and Muyyid al-Dawla in 1065.
- Manuchihr Mosque, a medieval mosque built by the Kurdish emirate of Shaddadids in Ani between 1072 and 1086.

== Sites in Syria and Western Kurdistan ==
- Abu'l-Fida Mosque, erected in 1327 by Abulfeda, the Kurdish prince and governor of Hama.
- Al-Adil's minaret in Maskanah, built in 1210 by the Ayyubids.
- Beit Junblatt in Aleppo, built by Janbulad ibn Qasim al-Kurdi in the 16th century, it has the largest iwan in Aleppo.
- Khan al-Arous in Qutayfa, built by Saladin in 1181-1182.
- Al-Otrush Mosque in Aleppo, construction started under Mamluk emir Aqbogha al-Otrush Al-Hadhabani and finished in 1408 by his successor.
- Al-Mujahidiyah Madrasa in Damascus, built in 1142 by Burid governor Mujahid al-Din bin Bazan bin Yammin al-Kurdi.
- Bimaristan al-Qaymari in Damascus, built between 1248 and 1258 by Sayf al-Din Yusuf, a member of the Kurdish royal family Al-Qaymari.
- Al-Muqaddamiyya madrasah in Aleppo, built by Zengid Kurdish commander Muhammad ibn al-Muqaddam in 1168. only the portal and some parts of the mosque, particularly the mihrab, remain.
- Bab al-Maqam in Aleppo, built by Ayyubid emir Al-Aziz Muhammad in 1230.
- Bab al-Ahmar, located in Aleppo, built during the reign of the Ayyubid emir of Aleppo al-Aziz Muhammad.
- Al-Adiliyah Madrasa, Damascus, 13th-century madrasah which was built by the Ayyubid Sultan Al-Adil I.
- Citadel of Damascus, originally built by a turkman warlord, it was demolished and rebuilt completely by the Ayyubid Sultan Al-Adil between the years 1203-1216, the current citadel dates primarily to the Ayyubid period.
- Citadel of Aleppo, ancient citadel which was greatly expanded under the Ayyubids. The majority of the citadel dates back to the reign of Al-Zahir Ghazi.
- Nimrod Fortress, Mount Hermon, built by the Ayyubid sultan Al-Malik al-Aziz Uthman.
