= Made in Mexico =

Made in Mexico may refer to:

- Made in Mexico (band), a band with Skin Graft Records
- Made in Mexico (TV series), a 2018 reality television series
- Made in Mexico, a 1998 version of the Fender Wide Range guitar pickup
- "Made in Mexico", a 2022 song by Eric Ethridge
- Manufacturing in Mexico

== See also ==
- Hecho en Mexico (disambiguation)
