= Hanna Jaff =

Mexican-American television and media personality

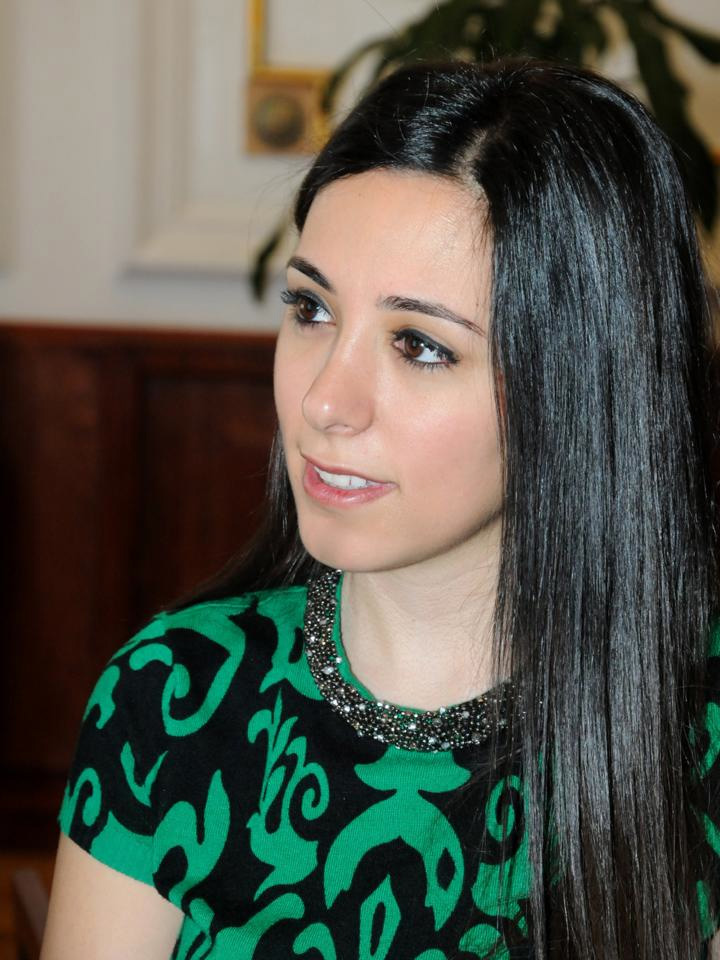
- Born: Hanna Jazmin Jaff Bosdet; November 4, 1986 (age 39); San Diego, California, U.S.
- Occupations: Media personality, executive producer, founder of Jaff Foundation for Education
- Spouse: Harry Roper-Curzon (m. 2020; div. 2022) Francisco de Borja Queipo de Llano (m. 2022)
- Children: 2
- Website: hannajaff.com/en/

Hanna, Marchioness of Guadiaro (born Hanna Jazmin Jaff Bosdet; November 4, 1986) is an American-born Mexican television personality who runs the non-profit Jaff Foundation for Education. She is married to Francisco de Borja Queipo de Llano y Campomanes, 6th Marquess of Guadiaro and eldest son of the 12th Count of Toreno and Grandee of Spain.

== Early life ==
Hanna Jaff was born in San Diego, California. She is a paternal descendant of the Jaff tribe and a maternal descendant of Carlos Henry Bosdet. The Jaff tribe is a Kurdish dynasty with a history of over 900 years and a population of four million members. Her grandfather, Dawood Beg Jaff, was the former leader of the tribe.

After graduating high school in San Diego, Jaff completed a Bachelor of Arts degree in Psychology from the National University. She later completed a Master's degree in International Relations at the Harvard Extension School in Cambridge, Massachusetts. Additionally, she intermittently attended La Sorbonne in Paris, King's College in London, and Columbia University in New York for extended programs both during and after completing her degrees.

== Career ==
In 2013-2018, Jaff held a number of nationwide political roles at the Institutional Revolutionary Party in Mexico, such as Undersecretary of Immigrants, Undersecretary of Relations with the Civil Society, among others.

In 2013, Jaff founded the Jaff Foundation for Education, which she currently runs. The organization's goal is to improve education in Mexico through teaching the English language. To that end, Jaff has self-published four self-taught English books and created scholarships, which the foundation donates to students. The foundation maintains offices in several states in Mexico.

Jaff has been a speaker at three TEDx Talks events in Mexico, as well as a discussant at the Milken Institute and the United Nations.

In 2017, Jaff launched a clothing line with the name We Are One Campaign to show support for the victims of war in the Middle East.

In 2018, Netflix announced that Jaff would be one of the cast members of the television show Made in Mexico, which began airing on September 28, 2018.

Jaff has appeared in several Mexican media outlets, including Forbes 100 most powerful women in Mexico in 2019 and 2022.

In 2021, Jaff was named Kindness Ambassador for UNESCO MGEIP global campaign.

In 2022, she was an executive producer of animated movie: “Águila y Jaguar: Los Guerreros Legendarios”.

== Personal life ==
Jaff married Harry Roper-Curzon in February 2020 and divorced two years later because of financial and domestic abuse committed by him.

In September 2022, she married Francisco de Borja Queipo de Llano y Campomanes, 6th Marquess of Guadiaro, Grandee of Spain, Knight of the Royal Maestranza of Cavalry of Granada, and heir to the Count of Toreno and other noble titles.
