= Qajar Bathhouse =

Historic bathhouse in Qazvin, Iran

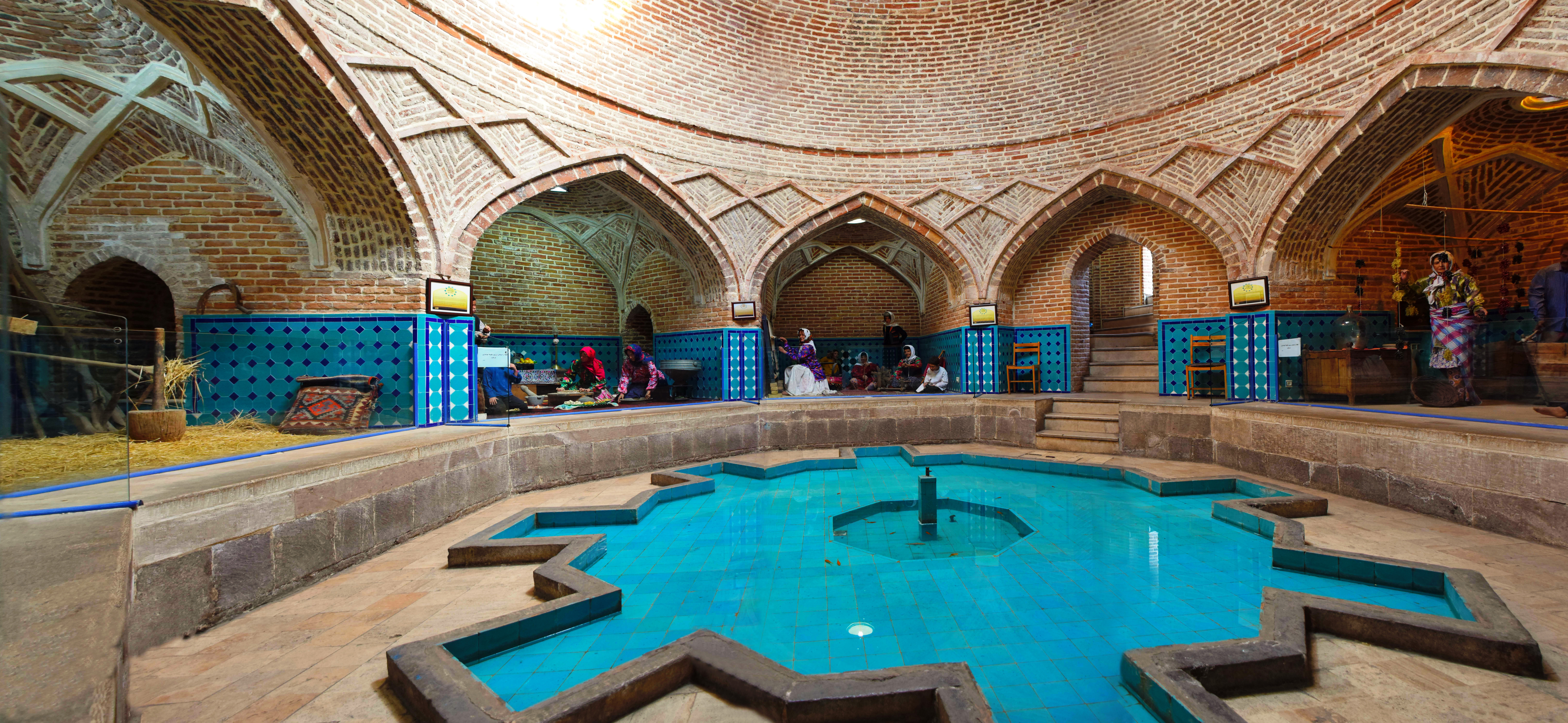
- Interactive map of Qajar Bathhouse
- Location: Qazvin, Iran
- Built: 1647

The Qajar Bathhouse (Persian: حمام قجر) is a historic bathhouse in Qazvin, Iran. It was built in 1647 during the Safavid era by the order of Shah Abbas II, and by Amingune Khan Qajar who was a Sardar of the Shah, and was initially known as the Shahi bathhouse.

It is approximately 1045 square meters large, and has two different sections for men and women. It is now used as an anthropology museum, and is listed among the Iranian national heritage sites with the number 12601.

== Gallery ==
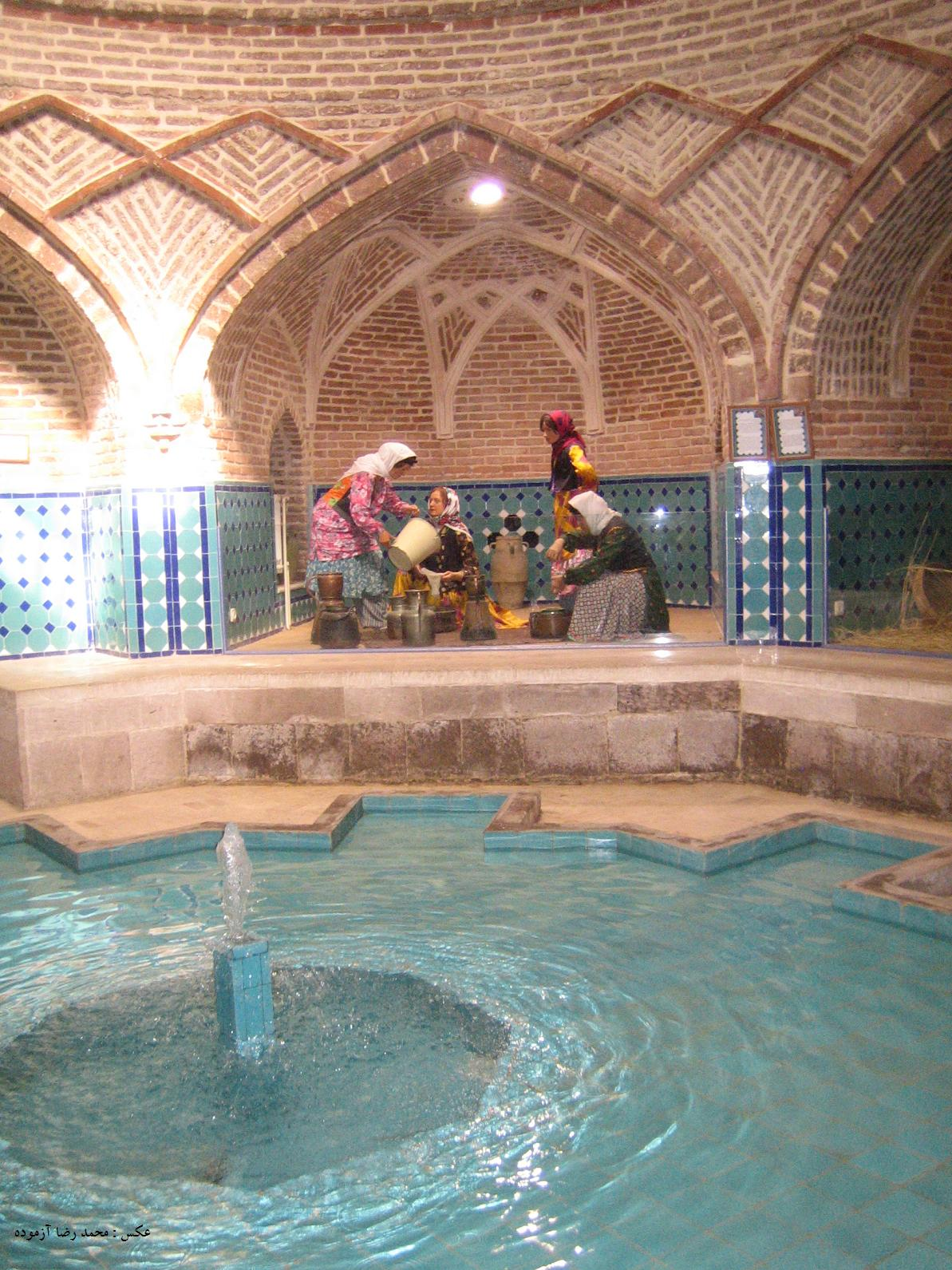

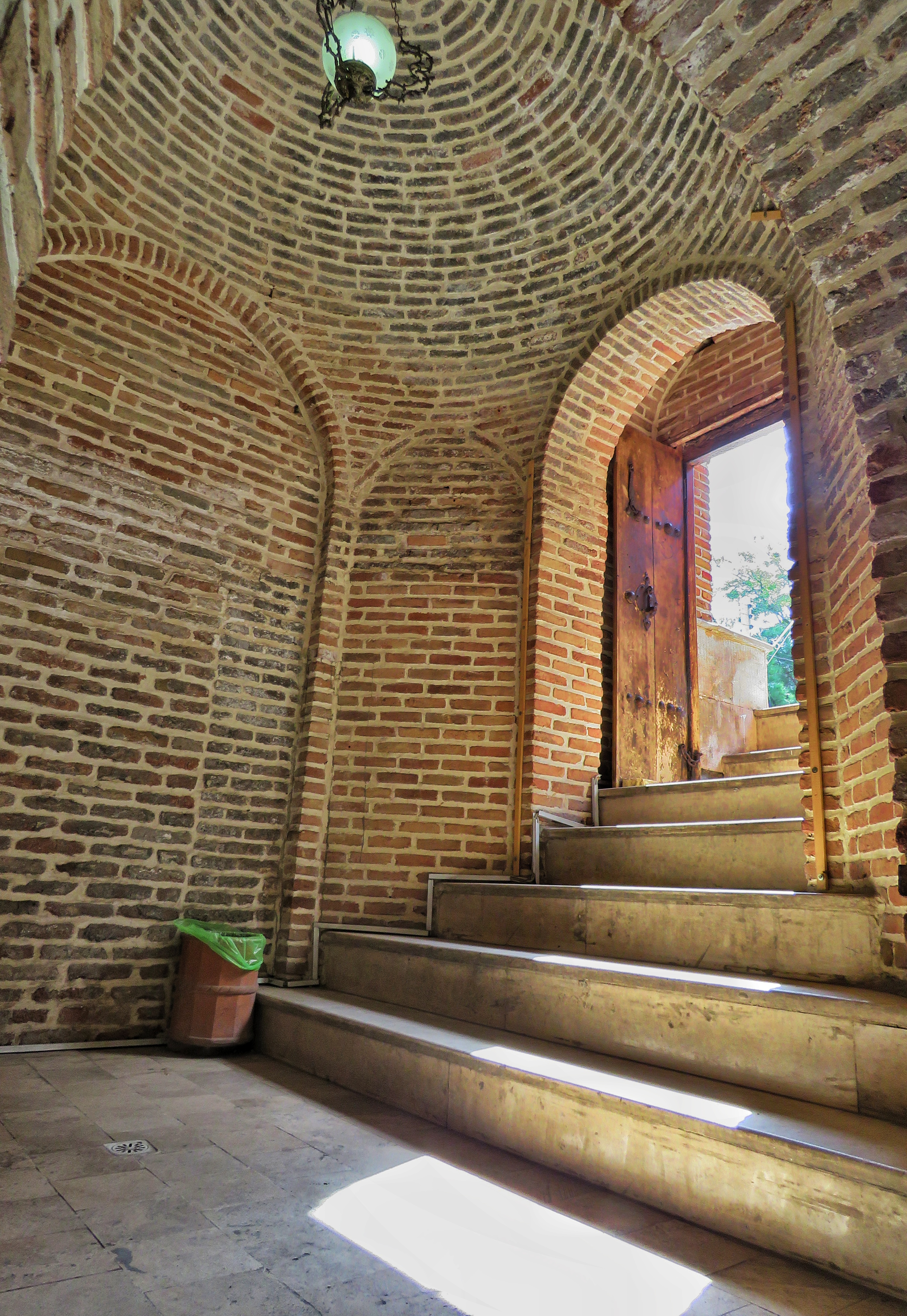

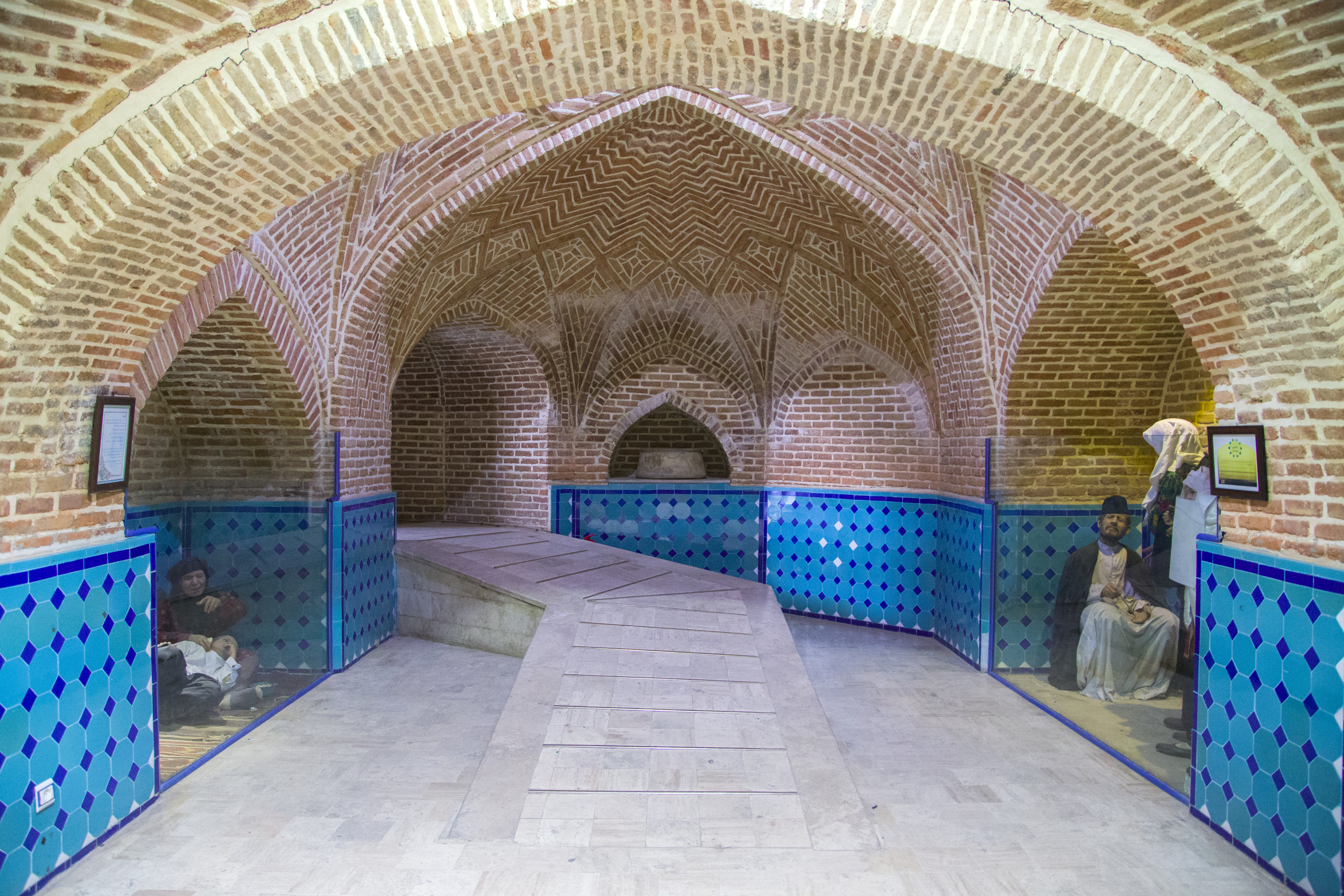

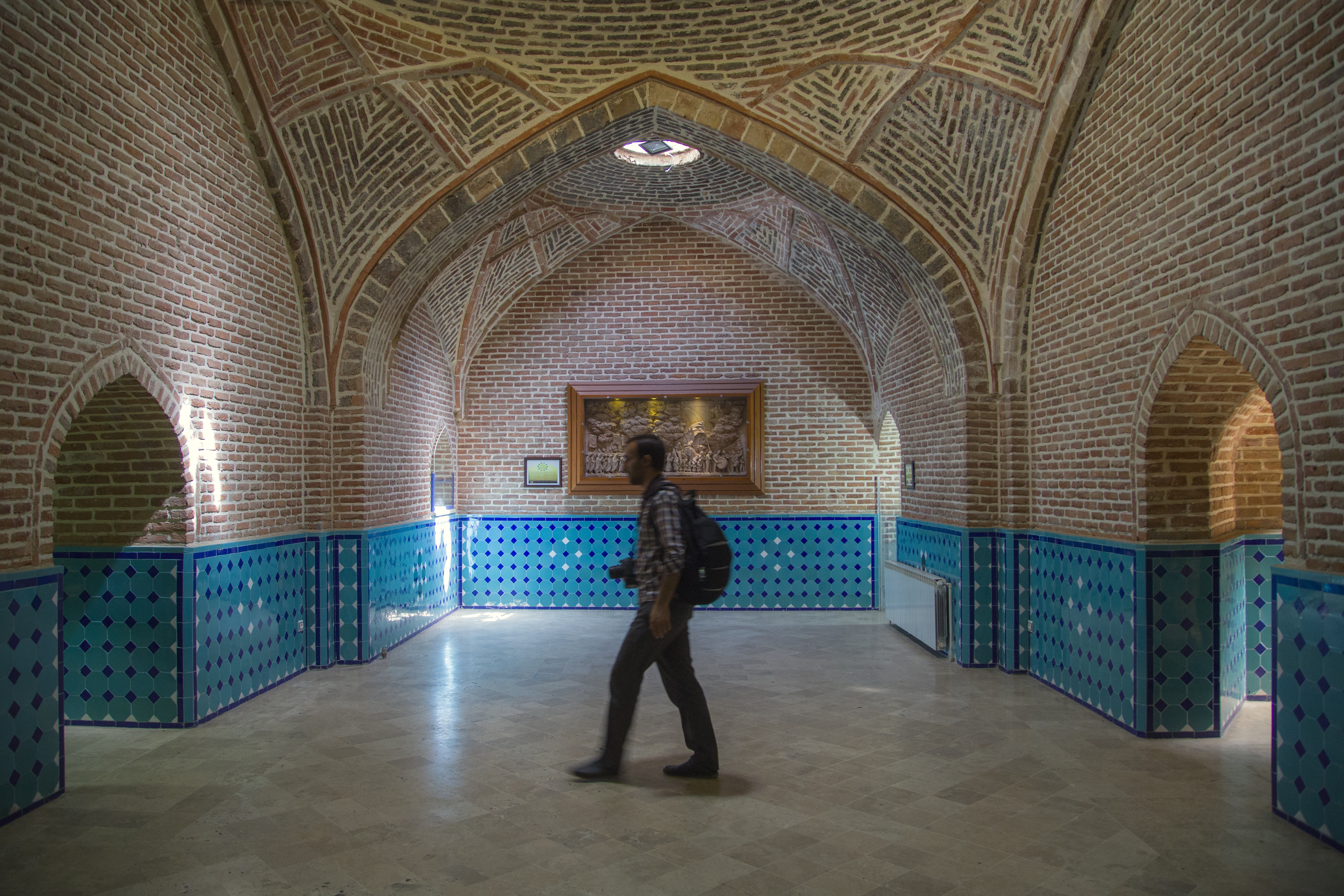

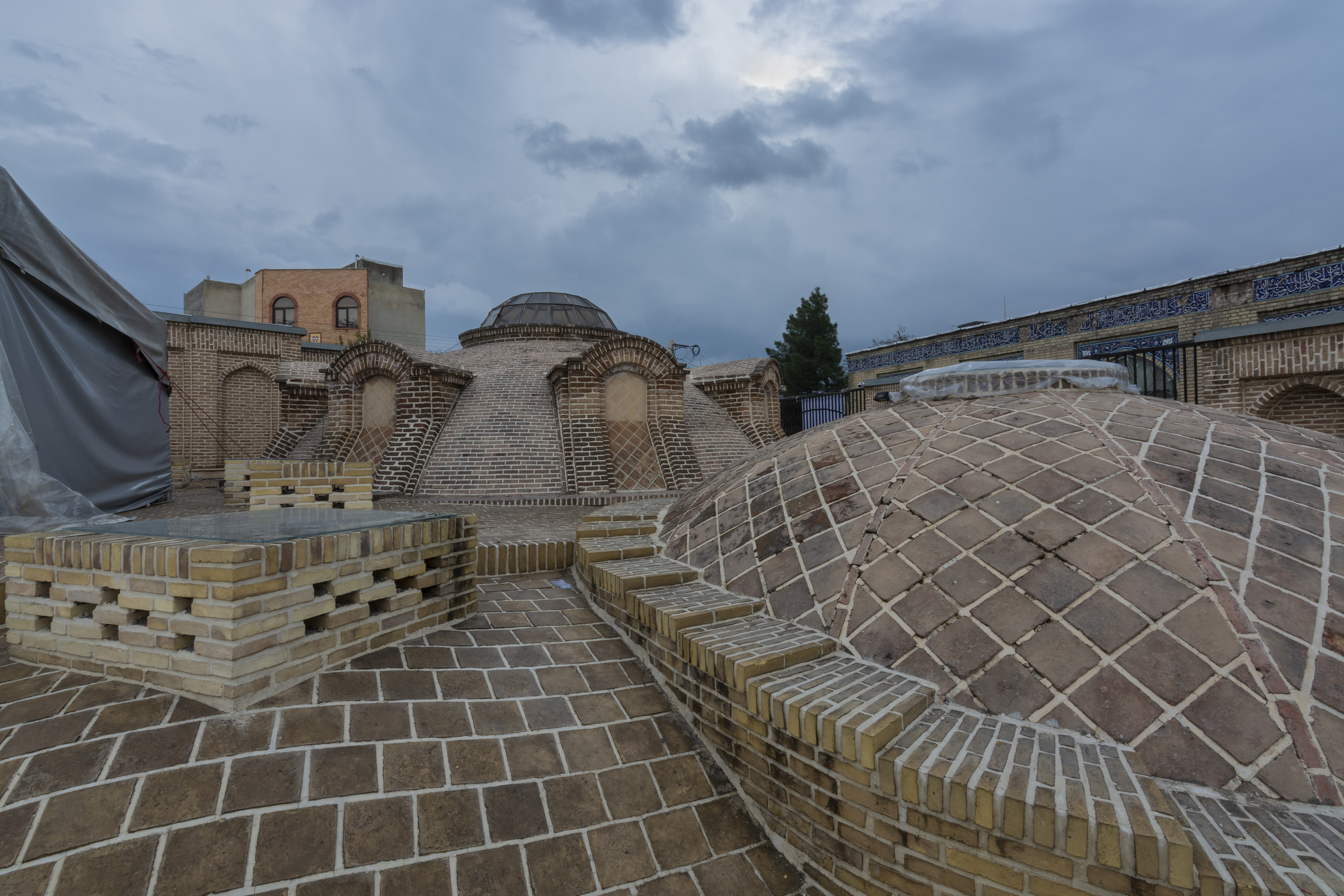

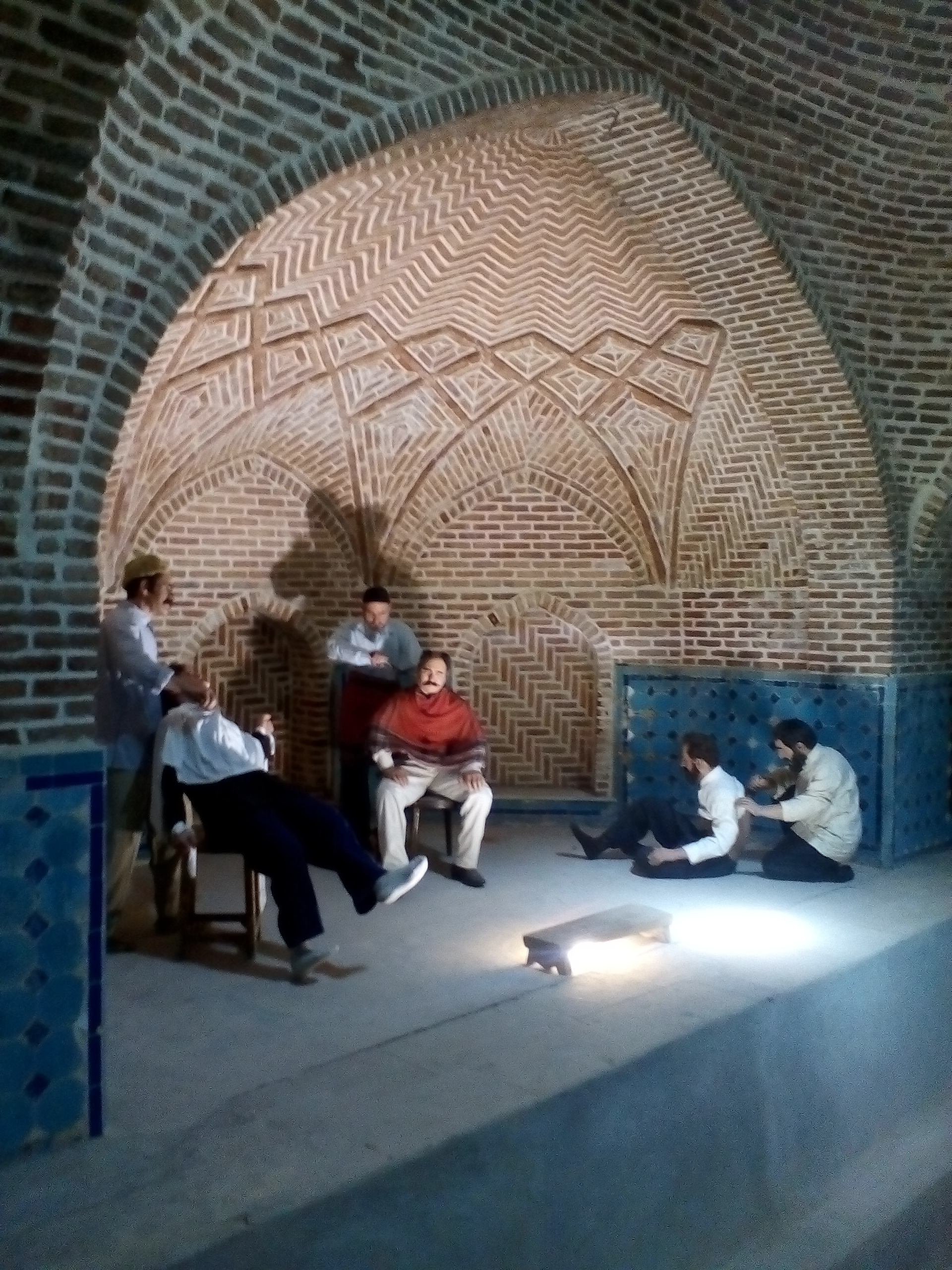

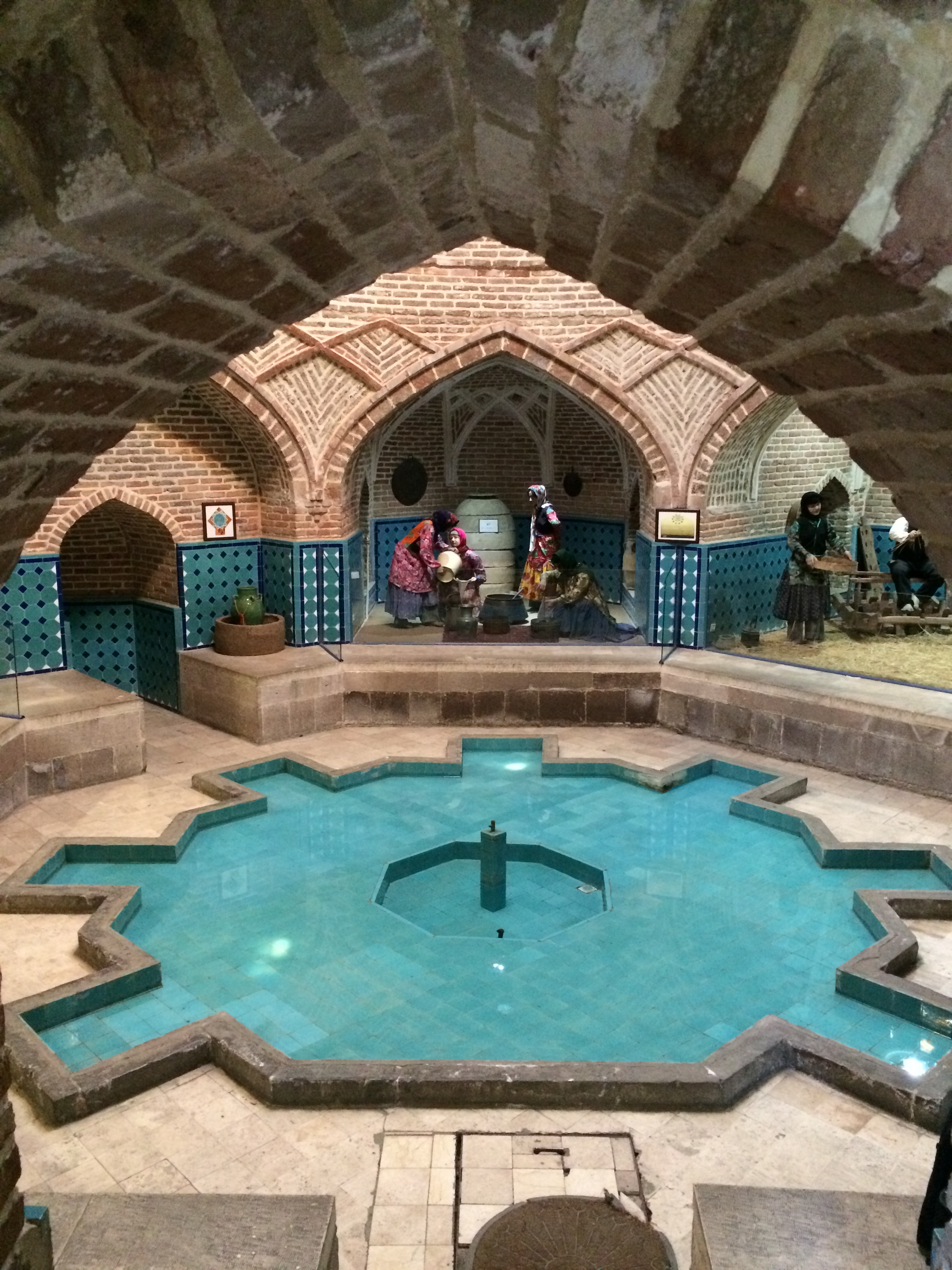

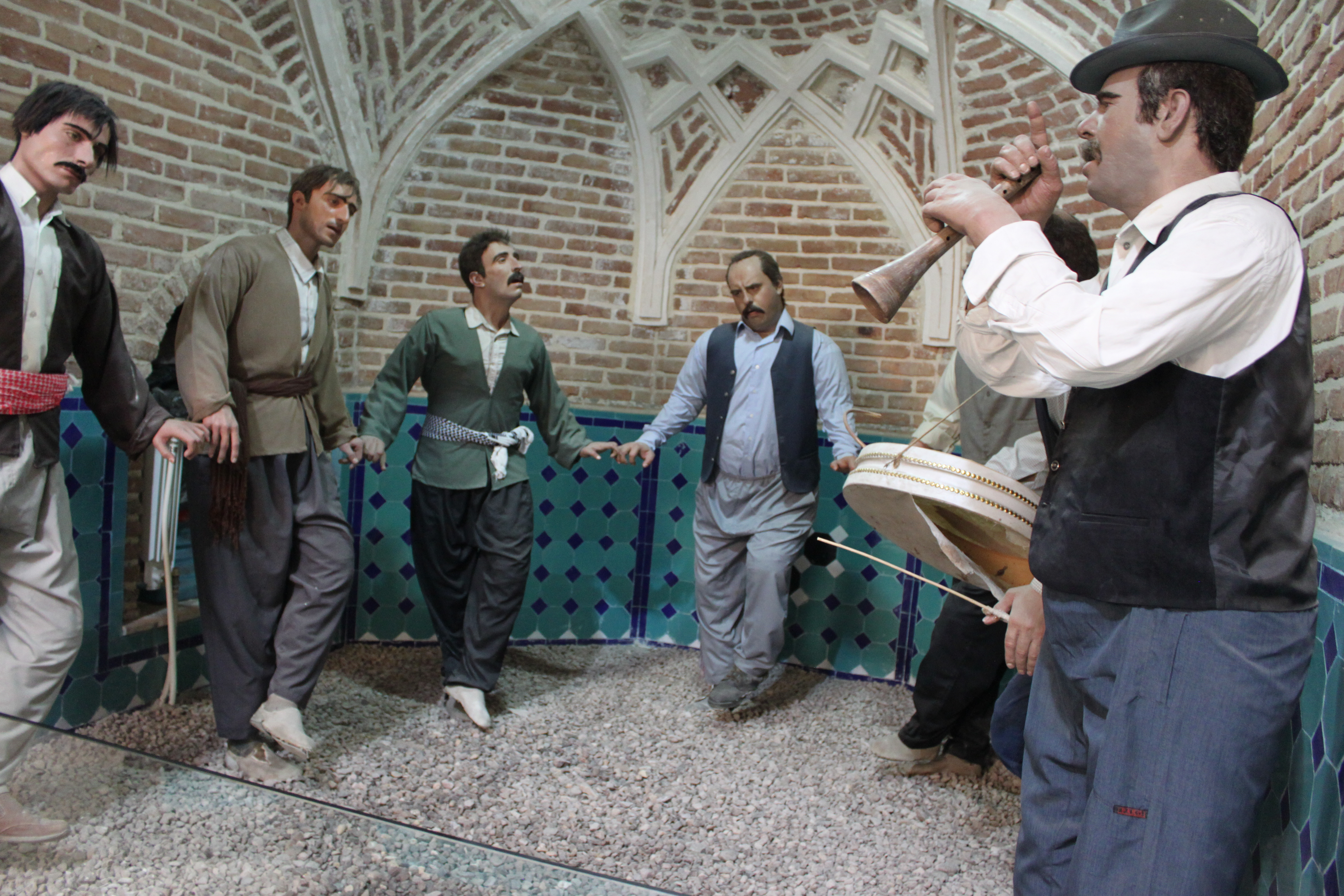

== See also ==
- Khan Bathhouse, Sanandaj
