= Jaff =

Kurdish tribe

Jaff جاف
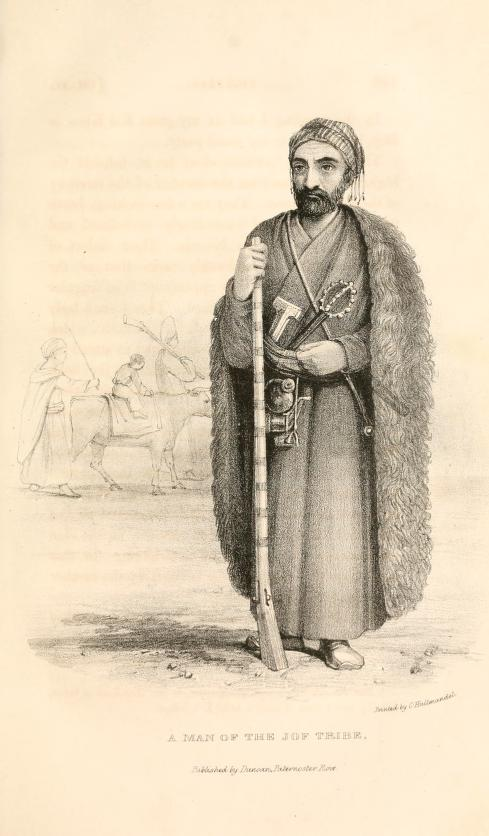
- A jaff tribesmen, 1836
- Ethnicity: Kurdish
- Location: Silêmanî to Sine
- Religion: Sunni Islam

The Jaff tribe, (Kurdish: جاف) is one of the largest Kurdish tribal confederations. It is a dynasty that originated in the year 1114 by Zaher Beg Jaff. Other important leaders were Mohamed Pasha Jaff, Lady Adela, Osman Pasha Jaff, and Mahmud Pasha Jaff. Their ancestral home is Sherwana Castle. The Ottoman Empire bestowed on them the name Pasha, a noble title, in the 1700s. They are the biggest Kurdish tribe in the Middle East with approximately 4 million people, and they speak Babani Sorani.

== Geographic distribution ==
The Jaff tribe lives in the following cities and towns: Helebce, Kelar, Silêmanî, Ravansar, Sine, Ciwanrro, Selas-bawecanî, Kirmaşan, and Xaneqîn.

The Jaff tribes of Iraq used to be called Muradi while those of Iran where called Javānrudi. The Jaff tribe was also historically called Jawani which came from Jawanrud. Their heartland is between Sulaymaniyah to Sanandaj. The Jaff tribes predominantly adhere to the Shafi'i school, with many Naqshbandi and Qadiriyya followers.

== History ==
The Jaff tribal confederation was formed in the early 17th century. They're not mentioned in Sharafnama. Their earliest mention was on 17 May 1639, in the Ottoman-Iranian treaty. The Jaff tribal confederation were nomadic pastoralist shepherds up until the 20th century. By the end of the 17th century, the main portion of the Jaff tribe fled from the Kermanshah and Sanandaj regions, that were under Ardalan control. The Jaff tribe came into conflict with Ardalan authority. After a battle in which the Jaff tribe were defeated by Ardalanids, their tribal chief and his son were captured and executed. The majority of Jaff tribes fled to Baban territory, where they were given protection and were allowed to settle and to graze their flocks from South of Sulaimanyah all the way to Khanaqin. Those Jaff tribes that remained in Ardalan territory joined the Guran tribal confederation.

The West began ties with the Jaff tribe during World War I, when Ely Bannister Soane established contact. After the war, the tribe opposed Sheikh Mahmud Barzanji, as well as Great Britain's failure to grant Kurdish autonomy in Iraq. C.J. Edmonds described the Jaff as "the Kurds par excellence". At the beginning of the 20th century, the tribe controlled one ninth of Iraq along with the communication system of the country. In 1933, about 100,000 rifles were in the hands of the tribe, contrasting with only 15,000 held by the newly established Iraq. During this period, the tribe became sedentary.

Not all four million members of the Jaff tribe share direct blood lineage, especially with the ruling Jaff leaders. Historically, only a minority of households claimed direct genealogical descent. Over time, various unrelated families and clans affiliated with the Jaff name for protection, political influence, and social survival.

== Political Relations ==
All tribes of Iranian Kurdistan and Luristan at one point had sections under Jaff protection. Iraqi Parliament records further document repeated meetings between parliamentary leaders and Jaff tribal delegations, reflecting the tribe's continued role in cultural and political representation and participation in national dialogue. The United States CIA also lists the Jaff tribe alongside the Barzani and Talabani as among "the three most important tribes in Iraq," noting their size, organization, and political influence. Among these tribes, the Jaff is the biggest. Cambridge University identifies the Jaff tribe as one of the major Kurdish tribal confederations, historically aligned with the Baban Emirate and occupying strategic areas across the Zagros region.

According to the U.S. Department of State's Office of the Historian, the Jaff tribe are identified as one of the leading Kurdish tribes, implying major demographic weight, extensive territorial presence, and significant political and military influence during the period. Their designation places the Jaff at the center of Kurdish dynamics, internal tribal relations, and the broader interplay between Kurdish groups and the Iraqi government.

The President of the Republic of Iraq constantly holds meetings with representatives of the Jaff tribe to discuss social, economic, and public service issues affecting Jaff communities, particularly in the Kurdistan Region. These engagements have focused on challenges related to economic development, access to public services, and local governance.

Because Iraq is described as a strongly tribal society, many people, especially in times of weak state institutions, turn to tribal leaders like those of the Jaff to resolve disputes instead of using government courts.

== Language ==
The Jaff tribes are majority Sorani-speakers, but those near Gurani-speaking and Southern Kurdish-speaking tribes have adopted many elements of their dialect. The Jaff princes from 17th-19th century were Gurani-speakers and patrons of Gurani literature.

== Notable members ==
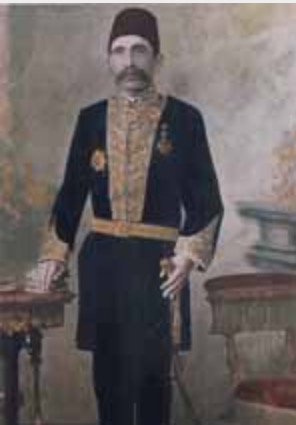
Mahmud Pasha Jaff in his bedroom.

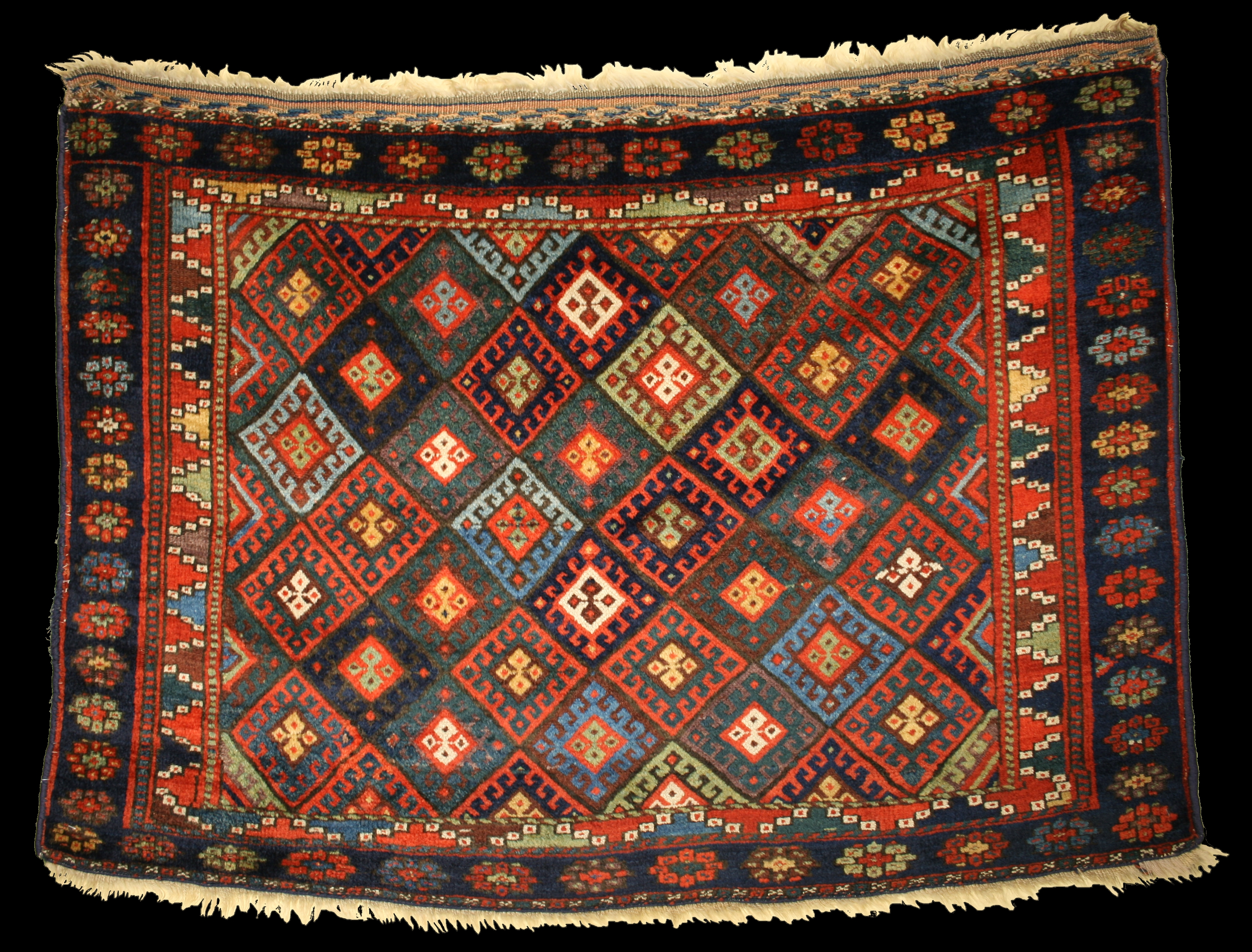
Jaff Kurdish bag, Persia, mid 19th century

Leaders and politicians

- Mohamed Pasha Jaff, a Kurdish king and supreme chief of the Jaff tribe. He built Sherwana Castle in 1734.
- Osman Pasha Jaff, (born 1846) a Kurdish king, leader of the Jaff tribe, and married to Adela Khanum of the old Ardalan tribe.
- Adela Jaff (1847–1924), called Princess of the Brave by the British; married Kurdish King Osman Pasha Jaff, was famous for her role in the region, namely in the era of Shiekh Mahmood Al-Jaff Hafeed.
- Joanna Palani also known as "Lady Death" by ISIS, is a Kurdish fighter from the Jaff tribe of Kermanshah (Kirmaşan). Born in the desert of Ramadi, Iraq, her family was forced to leave their hometown in Kirmaşan due to their involvement in the Kurdish national resistance against both Saddam Hussein and the Islamic regime of Iran. Over the years, Palani has fought for various Kurdish groups across greater Kurdistan and has been imprisoned because of it. ISIS placed a bounty of one million dollars on her head.
- Ahmed Mukhtar Jaff (1898–1934), was a member of Iraqi parliament and mayor of Halabja.
- Nawzad Dawood Beg Jaff (also known as Nozad Dawood Fattah Al Jaff), Chairman of North Bank Iraq and leader of the Jaff tribe.
- Akram Hamid Begzadeh Jaff, a Kurdish leader, politician, and former Minister of Agriculture in Iraq.
- Dawood Beg Jaff was a Kurdish prince, a member of the Iranian Parliament and minister, and the leader of the Jaff Tribe from the 1930s to the 1960s.
- Gen. Shawkat Haji Mushir, a senior figure of the Jaff tribe, was a high-ranking Kurdish official whose influence was significant enough to mediate between political parties and militant groups before his assassination.
- Bakir Ahmed Aziz Al-Jaff: Iraq’s Ambassador to Ukraine.
- Mr. Bakhtiar Jabbar Amin Al-Jaff: Minister of Human Rights in Iraq.
- Hanna Jaff (born 1986), American-born Mexican-Kurd who is a politician, philanthropist, author, and spokeswoman. Granddaughter of the former leader of the Jaff tribe and niece of the current leader.

Artists, poets, singer

- Khanai Qobadi Jaff (ca.1700–1759), an 18th-century Jaff poet.
- Nali Jaff (1797 or 1800–1855 or 1856), a poet who contributed to making Sorani the literary language of southern Kurdistan.
- Abdulla Goran Jaff (1904–1962).
- Tara Jaff (born 1958), singer and musician specializing in harp.

Scholars and academics

- Fereidoun Biglari (born 1970), archaeologist and museum curator.

== Sources ==
- Hamzeh'ee, M. Reza Fariborz (2008). "JAF (JĀF)". In Yarshater, Ehsan (ed.). Encyclopædia Iranica. Vol. XIV/4: Jade III–Jamalzadeh, Mohammad-Ali II. Work. London and New York: Routledge & Kegan Paul. pp. 346–347. ISBN 978-1-934283-04-2.
