= Sherwana Castle =

Castle located in Kalar, Kurdistan Region, Iraq

- قەڵای شێروانە
- Part of Kalar, Kurdistan Region, Iraq
- Kalar; Near Kalar in Iraq
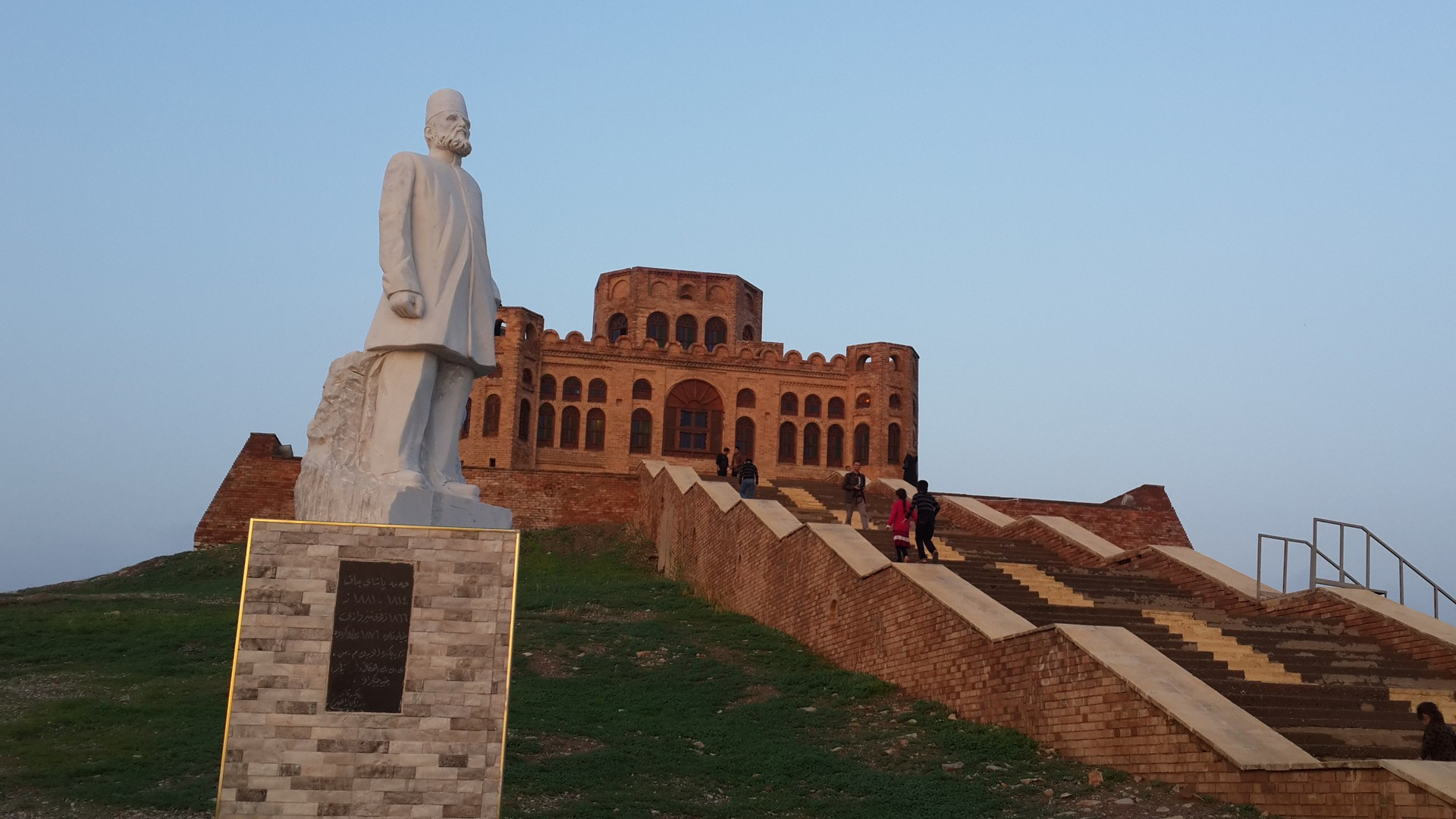
- Sherwana Castle

Site information
- Type: Castle
- Owner: Jaff family
- Open to the public: Yes
- Condition: Partially restored

Location
- Location in Iraq
- Coordinates: 34.6070°N 45.3133°E

Site history
- Built: 1866
- Built for: Mohamed Pasha Jaff
- Built by: Mohamed Pasha Jaff
- In use: 1866–present
- Materials: Stone and brick
- Battles/wars: Various Kurdish and Ottoman conflicts
- Events: Damaged in the 1990s, 2014 heavy rains, and 2017 earthquake; restored in 2018
- Sherwana Castle is an important historical and cultural landmark in the Kurdistan Region.

Sherwana Castle (Kurdish: قەڵای شێروانە, romanized: Qellay Şêrwane), also known as Shirwanah Castle, is a castle located in Kalar, Kurdistan Region, Iraq. Sherwana Castle is the ancestral home of the Jaff family.

== History ==
It was built by Mohamed Pasha Jaff, Kurdish pasha serving the Ottoman Empire, during the 1800s. After the Mamluk Vali of Baghdad, Suleiaman Pasha, dealt a crushing defeat to the Persian occupation of Abbas Mirza Qajar of Northern Mesopotamia, and put to flight the Babans in 1850, Mohamed Pasha Jaff along with the Jaff nomads were allowed to dwell in the Shahrizor unharassed by the Ottomans or Persians in any way. A golden age began for the Jaff as they became a major power in all the region.

Their nomadic caravans were allowed pasture from Khanaqin and Qizil Rubat to Pênciwên in the Shahrizor region of Kurdistan. In these regions Mohammed Pasha Jaff from his position of power began to crack down on all of his enemies from the Pro Baban Jaff under Aziz Beg Jaff, who was the son of Kai Khasrow Beg Jaff to the rival tribe of the Hemevand, who were anti Ottoman and anti-everything. He would erect a fortress on the banks of the Shirwan river to guard against all of these foes in 1866.

This fortress is now known as the Şêrwane fortress. In 1868, he would be appointed by the Mamluk Vali Suliaman Pasha of Baghdad. The Jaff's rivals, Hamavands, would go to the Caucasus and fight under for the Russians against the Ottomans. The Russians would arm them and send them back to agitate the Shahrizor and create anarchy.

Osman Pasha Jaff's son, would be given the residence of the fortress, as his father concerned himself with the affairs of Gulanbar and Halabja, Mohammed Ali Beg Jaff. During World War I the Jaff and the Kurds would fall into obscurity as most of the war took place in the South between the Ottomans and British, fighting a back forth battle around Kut, which the Ottomans would deal the British their worst defeat during the war. The British would finally get the upper hand through other fronts, the Palestine front especially. The Ottomans would sign the Treaty of Mudros in 1917. The British would then occupy Mesopotamia, and the Ottoman Empire would cease to exist. During the British Occupation of Iraq, much of the Kurdish population would revolt under Sheikh Mahmud Barzanji, whose power base was in Sulimania in 1918, 1922-1924, including segments of the Jaff tribe. The British would end up destroying many Palaces and Fortresses built by the Kurds. Sherwana Castle was the exception, since the British had good relations with the Jaff rulers.

The castle was damaged due to military activity in the 1990s. Further damage occurred as the result of heavy rain in 2014 which affected the walls, causing them to crack. In 2017 an earthquake damaged 35% of the structure, including the cupola which partially collapsed. Restoration took place in 2018.

== See also ==
- List of castles in Iraq
- List of Kurdish castles
