= Hecho en Mexico =

Hecho en Mexico, or similar, may mean:

- Hecho en México (Alejandro Fernández album)
- Hecho en Mexico (Kinto Sol album)
- Hecho en México (El Tri album)

== See also ==
- Made in Mexico (disambiguation)
