= Sardar Castle =

Sardar Fort قلعه سردار
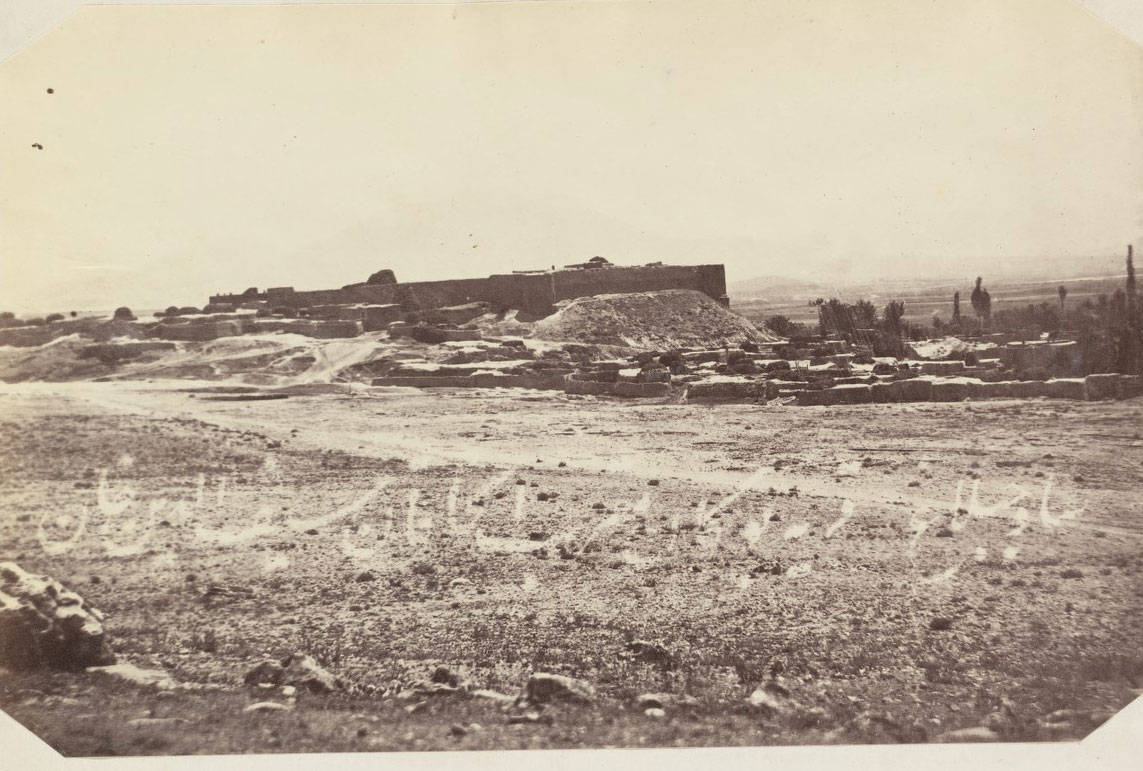
- Bukan, Sardar Fort in 1887

- Location within Iran
- 36°31′11.3″N 46°12′27.6″E
- Location: Bukan, West Azerbaijan, Iran

Iran National Heritage List
- Official name: Sardar Fort
- Type: Ruins
- Designated: 1967
- Reference no.: 570
- Conservation organization: Cultural Heritage, Handicrafts and Tourism Organization of Iran

Sardar Fort was built by Sardaar Aziz Khaan Mukri in 1868 (1285 AH) near the great reservoir of Bukan that is presently named after its founder as Sardar Azizkhan Castle.

The castle has been built on top of a hill 50×60 metres in diameter and 13 metres height and its main building materials are 20×20 cm bricks with gley mortar and timbers.

During 1946–1973 the castle was turned into police headquarters, post office, and school respectively and finally was destroyed completely in 1983 and replaced by a newly built structure that was used as Basij (Mobilization) Satrion.
