= Kashkan Bridge =

Coordinates: 33.5884°N 47.8816°E

- پل کشکان
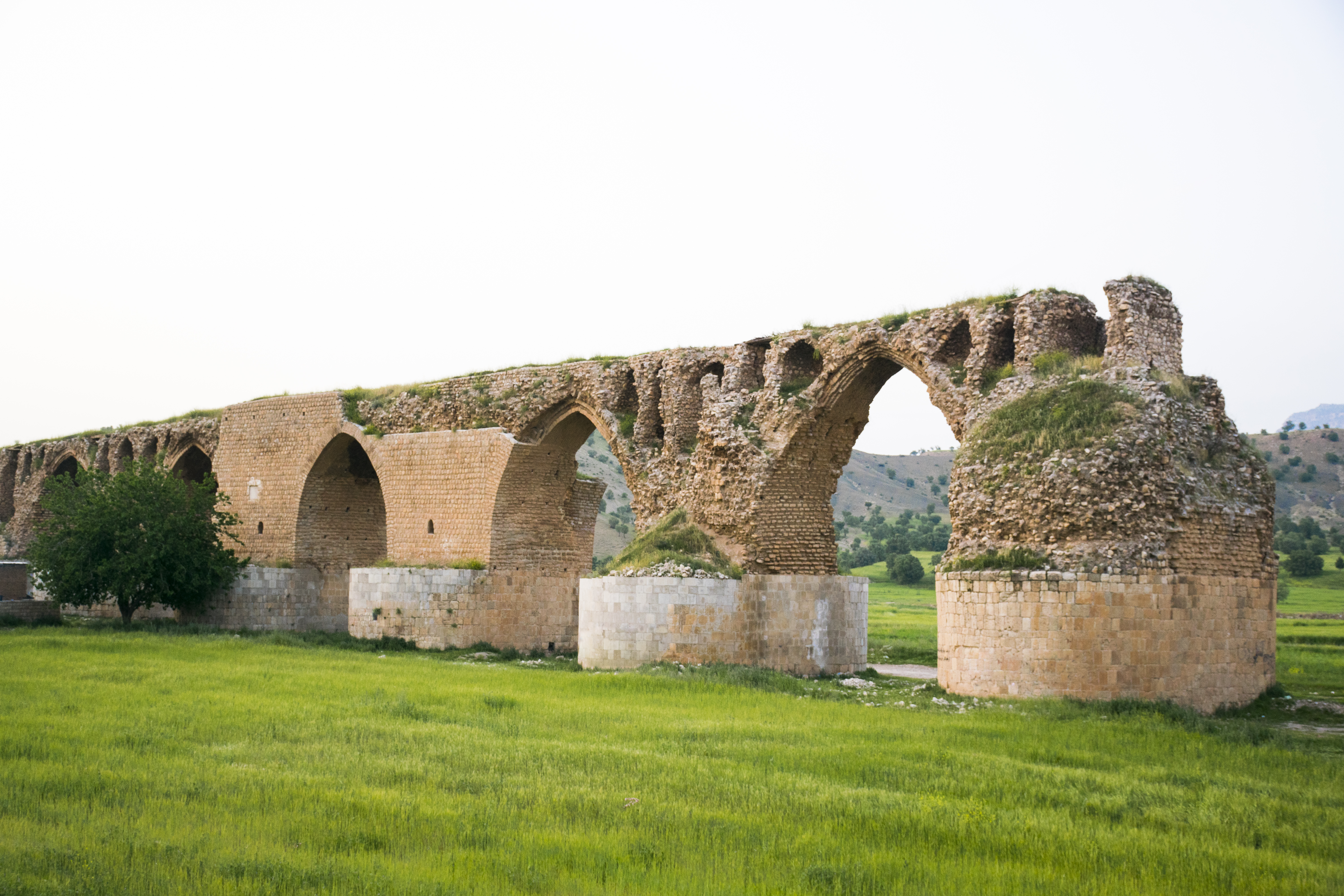

General information
- Location: Iran
- Construction started: 999 CE
- Completed: 1009 CE

Iran National Heritage List
- Official name: Kashkan Bridge
- Type: Bridge
- Designated: 1940
- Reference no.: 335
- Conservation organization: Cultural Heritage, Handicrafts and Tourism Organization of Iran

The Kashkan Bridge (Persian: پل کشکان) is a historical bridge in Lorestan province, Iran. Its construction started in 999 CE during the reign of Badr ibn Hasanwayh, and took 10 years to complete.

Having a length of 320 meters, the bridge originally contained 12 arches, 9 of which remain to this day.

The bridge is enlisted in the Iran National Heritage List with the number 355.
