= Jennifer Jaff =

American advocate

Jennifer Chett Jaff (June 12, 1957 – September 14, 2012) was an American advocate specializing in legal support for patients with chronic illnesses.

== Biography ==
Born in New Hyde Park, New York, Jaff graduated from Queens College and received her law degree from Georgetown University.

After working as a trial lawyer and serving as an assistant state attorney general in Connecticut during the late 1990s, Jaff returned to private practice, focusing on representing clients with chronic medical conditions.

In 2005, Jaff founded Advocacy for Patients with Chronic Illness, a nonprofit providing free legal assistance primarily related to insurance claims for individuals with conditions such as Crohn's disease, autoimmune disorders, congenital metabolic disorders, and sickle cell anemia.

Jaff engaged in advocacy beyond direct legal representation by speaking publicly, lobbying policymakers, and authoring a handbook titled Know Your Rights, addressing insurance appeals, disability benefits, and discrimination in employment, education, and housing.

In 2012, Jaff submitted an amicus brief to the U.S. Supreme Court in National Federation of Independent Business v. Sebelius, supporting provisions in the Affordable Care Act that prohibited insurance companies from discriminating based on pre-existing medical conditions.
