= Made in Mexico (TV series) =

- Genre: Reality television
- Starring: Shanik Aspe; Roby Checa; Columba Díaz; Pepe Díaz; Carlos Girón; Hanna Jaff; Kitzia Mitre; Chantal Trujillo; Liz Woodburn
- Country of origin: United States
- Original languages: English, Spanish
- No. of seasons: 1
- No. of episodes: 8

Production
- Executive producer: Kevin Bartel
- Running time: 44 to 53 minutes
- Production company: Love Productions USA

Original release
- Release: September 28, 2018

Made in Mexico is a reality television series that follows the lives of nine young socialites and expats living in Mexico City.

Its first season premiered on Netflix in 2018, with eight episodes.

Although there were news reports about a second season, it was never broadcast.
