= Count of Toreno =

Title in the Spanish nobility

Count of Toreno (Spanish: conde de Toreno) Grandee of Spain is a title in the Spanish nobility. The title was first bestowed on Álvaro Queipo de Llano by Philip IV of Spain in 1657.

== List of counts of Toreno ==
- Álvaro Queipo de Llano, 1st Count of Toreno
- Fernando Queipo de Llano, 2nd Count of Toreno
- Fernando Queipo de Llano, 3rd Count of Toreno
- Fernando Ignacio José Queipo de Llano, 4th Count of Toreno
- José Joaquín Queipo de Llano, 5th Count of Toreno (1728–1792)
- José Marcelino Queipo de Llano, 6th Count of Toreno
- José María Queipo de Llano, 7th Count of Toreno (1786–1843)
- Francisco de Borja Queipo de Llano, 8th Count of Toreno (1840–1890)
- Álvaro de Borja Queipo de Llano, 9th Count of Toreno (1864–1938)
- Francisco de Borja Queipo de Llano, 10th Count of Toreno (1898–1954)
- Francisco de Borja Queipo de Llano, 11th Count of Toreno (1927–2002)
- Francisco de Borja Queipo de Llano, 12th Count of Toreno (born 1956)
- The heir apparent is the present holder’s son, Francisco de Borja Queipo de Llano (b. 1987), and is the current VI marquess of Guadiaro
