= Khan Bathhouse, Sanandaj =

Iranian national heritage site

Khan Bathhouse
- حمام خان
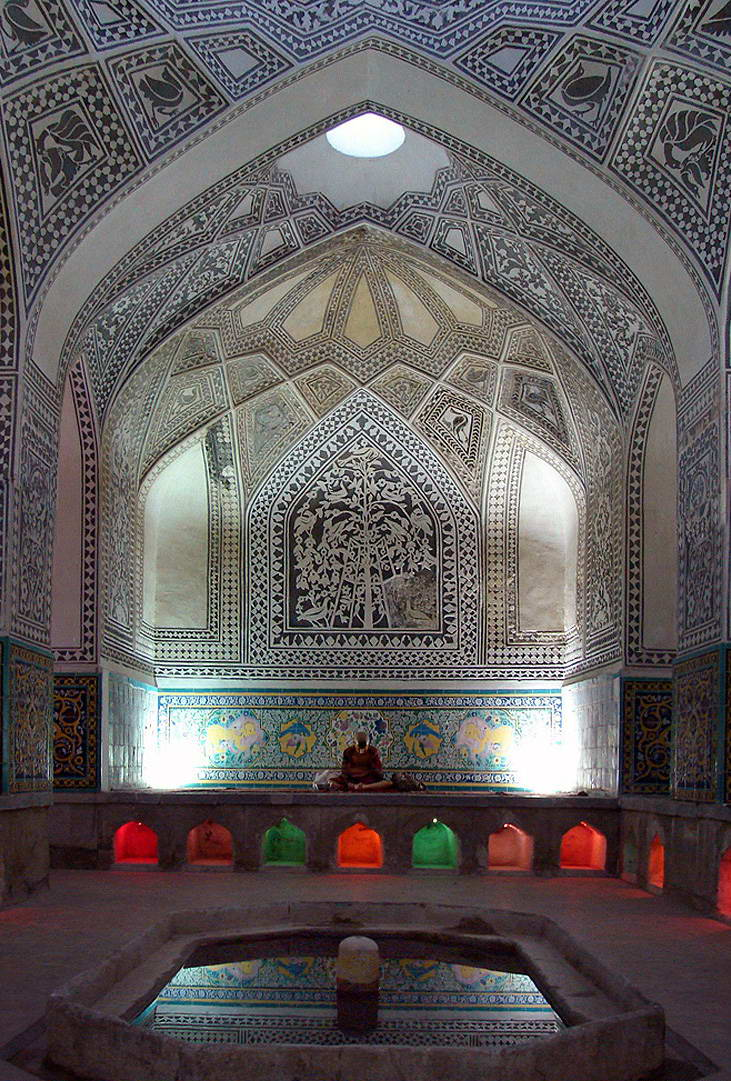
- Interactive map of the Khan Bathhouse area

General information
- Status: Open, used as traditional restaurant.
- Location: Sanandaj, Iran
- Inaugurated: 1805

The Khan Bathhouse (Persian: حمام خان) is an early Qajar era public bath in Sanandaj, Iran. It was built in 1805 by the order of Amanollah Khan Ardalan, and was later repaired in 1878.

It was listed in the national heritage sites of Iran with the number 2603 on 15 March, 2000.

== Gallery ==
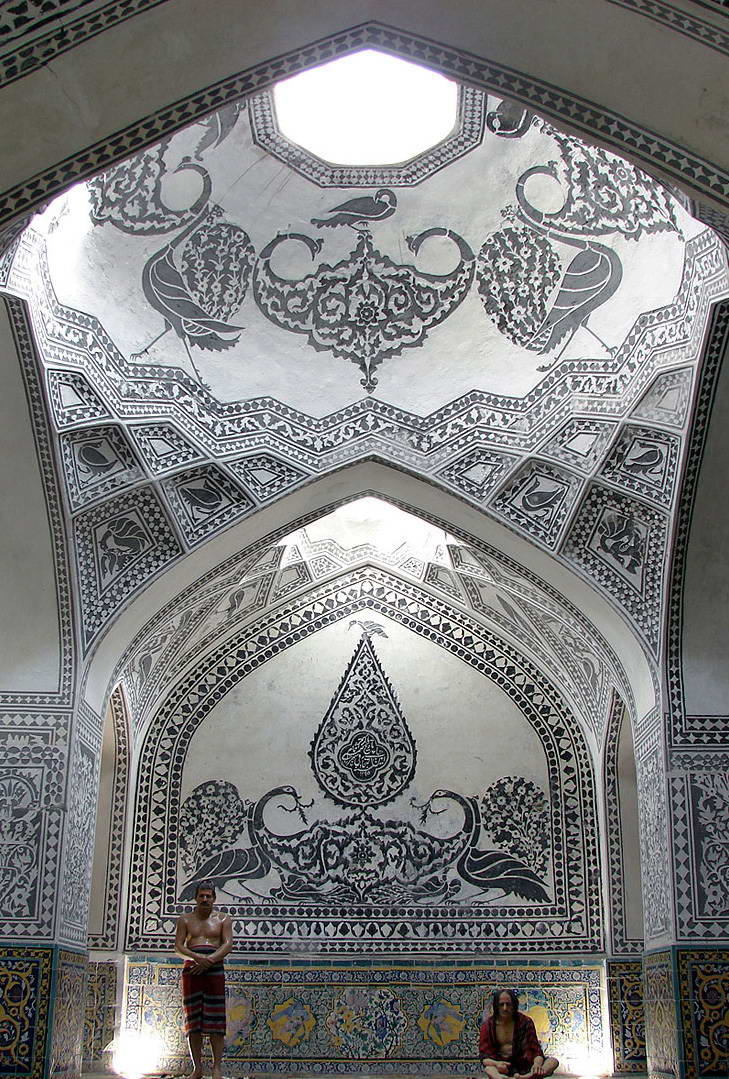

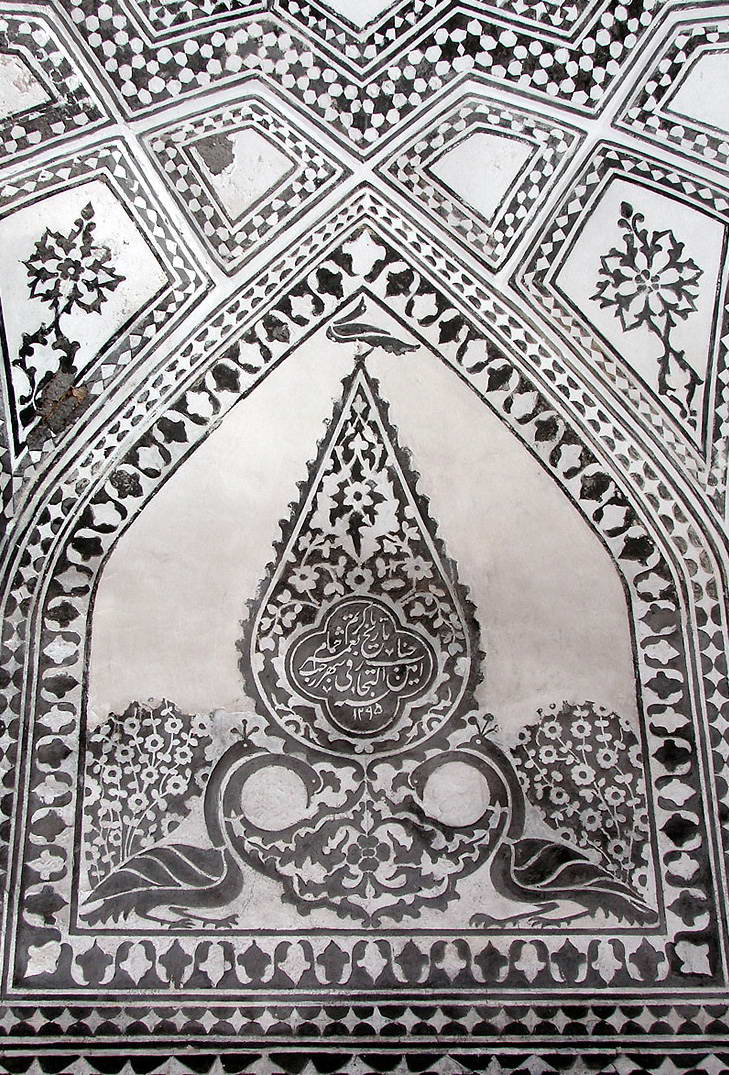

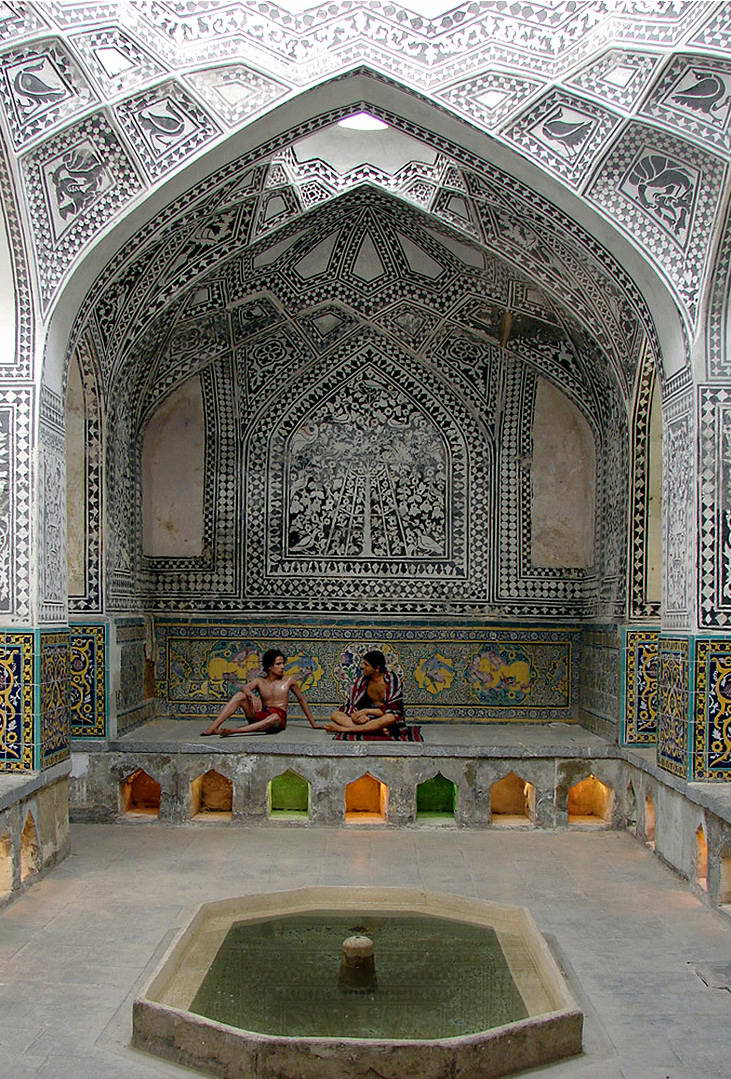

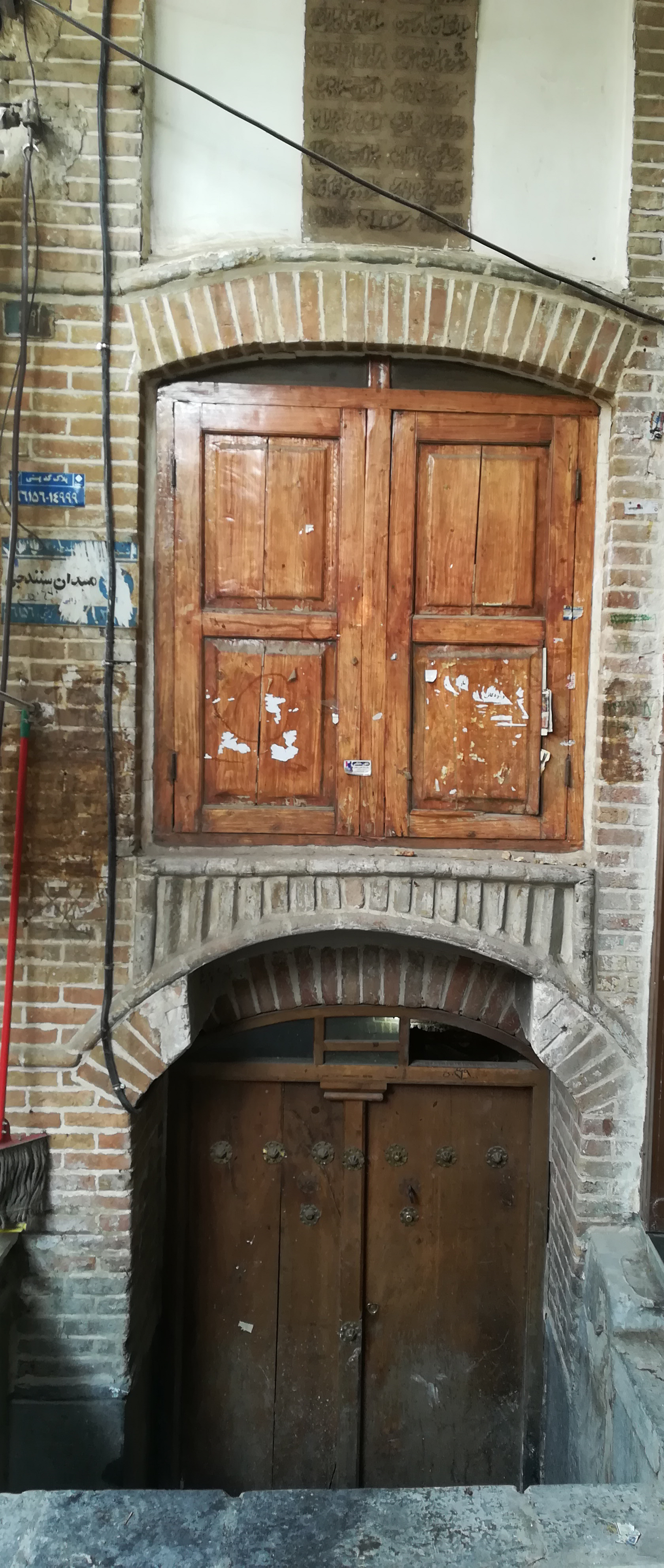

== See also ==
- Qajar Bathhouse
