= Ahmed Mukhtar Jaff =

Iraqi politician

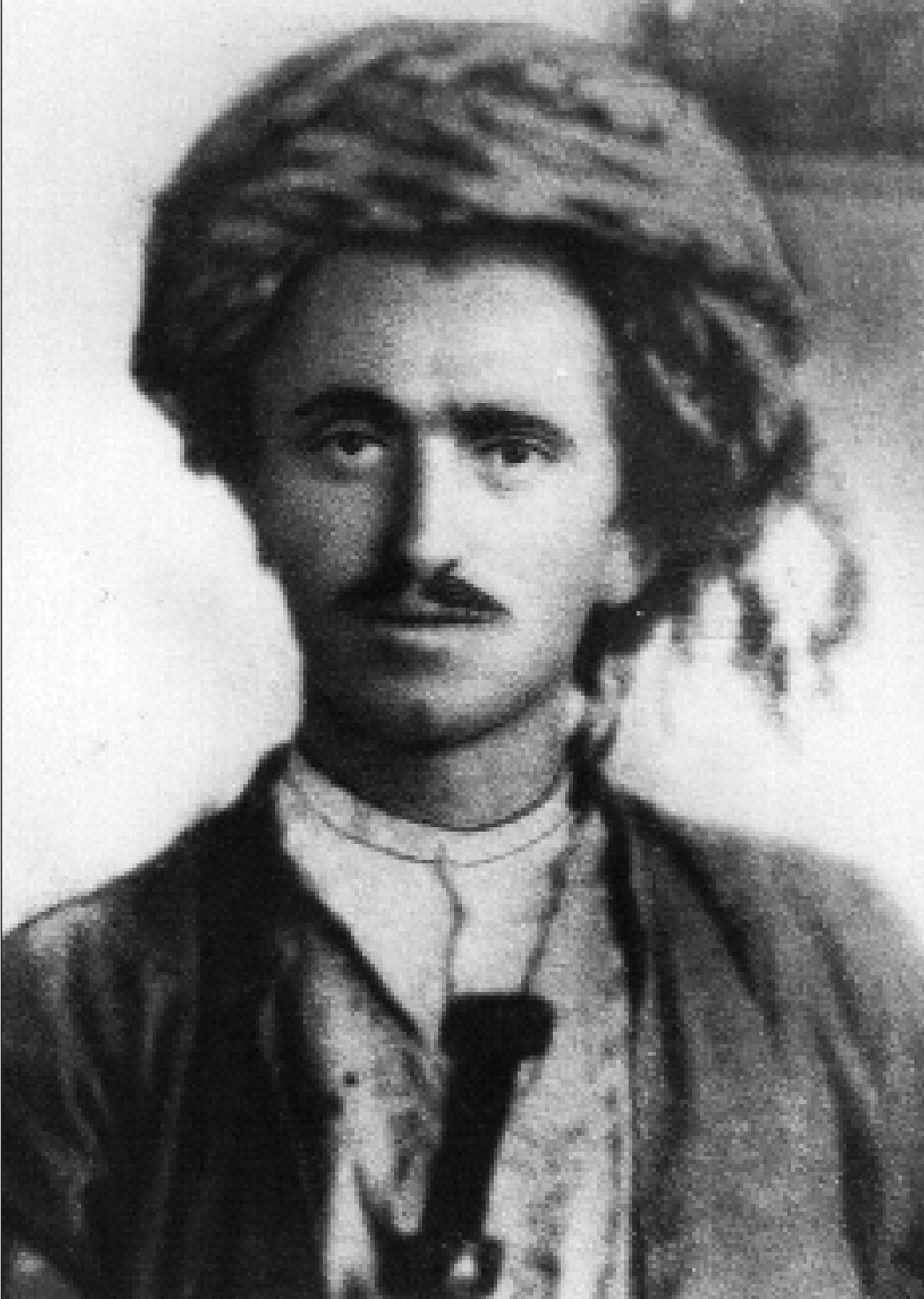
Image of Ahmad Mukhtar Jaff

Ahmed Mukhtar Jaff (1898–1934) was the son of Osman Pasha Jaff, an Ottoman Kurdish ruler of Mosul Vilayet, and Adela Kahnem AKA Adela Jaff (Lady Adela) . He was one of the most prominent leaders of the Jaf family, as well as a poet and a novelist.

Ahmed Mukhtar Jaf was a member of Iraqi parliament and mayor of Halabja. He was born in the year 1898 in the province of Halabja. He had two sons, Afrasiab Jaf and Ghandi Jaf, as well as three daughters, Shamsa Jaff, Roonak Jaff and Hameeda Jaff.

He was a patriot Kurd who called for Kurdistan's independence and opposed the English occupation. He was only 32 when he was killed by the River Meer or River Sirwan in 1934.
