= Akram Hamid Begzadeh Jaff =

Kurdish politician from Iraq

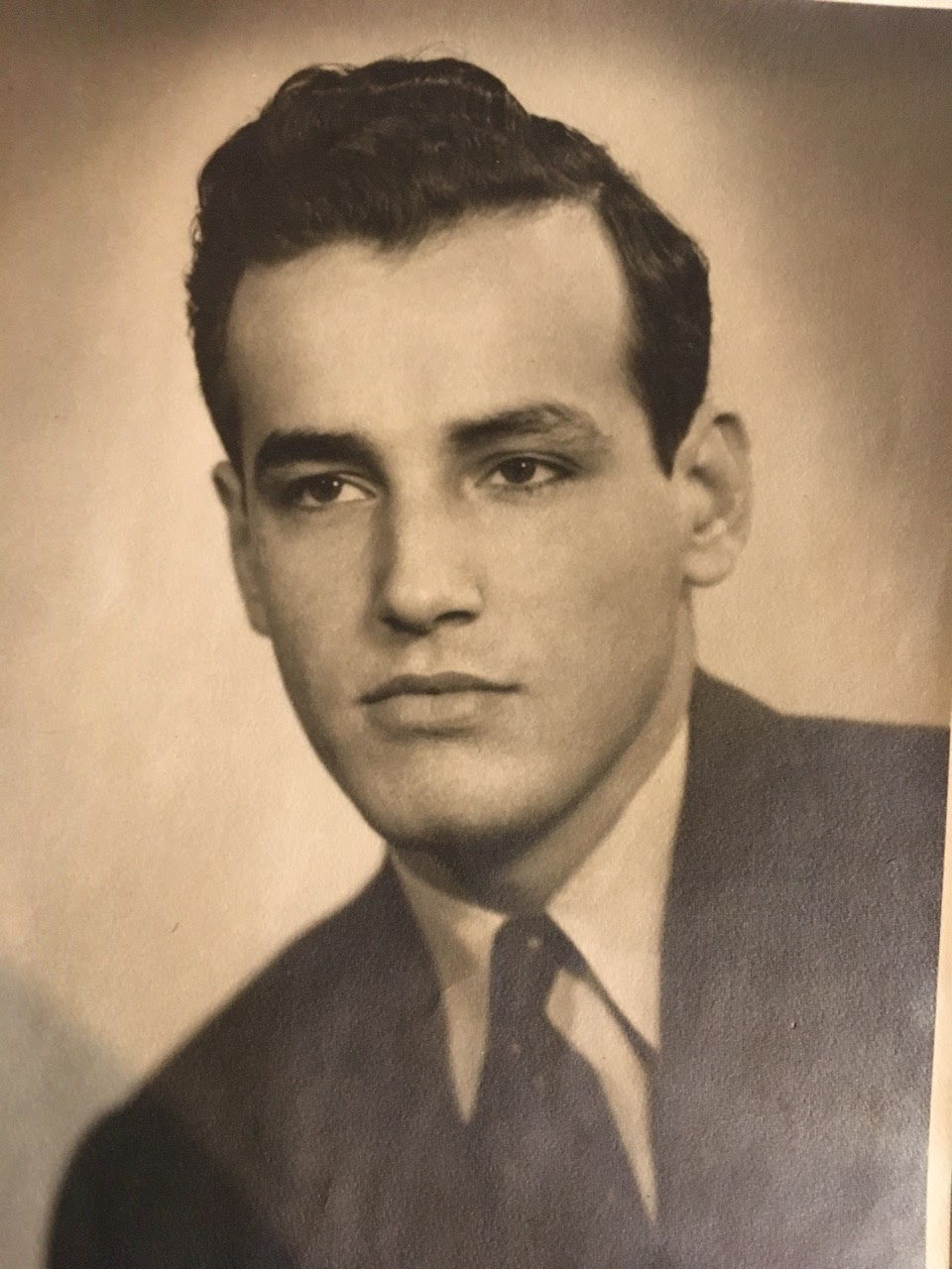
- Taken March 1951

Ambassador of Iraq UN Rome Based Agencies Senior United Nations Civil Servant

Personal details
- Born: Halabja, Kurdistan Region, Iraq
- Children: 5
- Education: PhD, Agricultural Genetics, Oregon State University
- Occupation: Politician, Executive, Academic

Akram Hamid Begzadeh Jaff الدكتور اكرم حامد بك جاف (14 July 1929 – 21 November 2010) was a Kurdish leader who served in various posts in the Iraqi government and the United Nations Development Program (UNDP). Also known as "Al Jaff" or "Al-Jaff" in some literature & records.

== Early life ==
Akram Hamid Begzadeh Jaff was born on 14 July 1929 in the Kurdish town of Halabja in the Kurdistan region of northern Iraq, a member of the Jaff tribe. He was the son of Hamid Begzadeh ("Hamid-Beg") Jaff. Dr. Jaff completed elementary and middle school in Halabja, and his high school in Baghdad. Dr. Jaff attended Royal Medical College in Baghdad briefly, before applying and getting accepted to university in the United States. Dr. Jaff moved to the United States to pursue his college education in 1948.

In 1951 Dr. Jaff received a Bachelor's degree in Agricultural Sciences from the Colorado State University in Fort Collins, Colorado (USA). In 1952 Dr. Jaff received his Master of Science degree in Agricultural Engineering from the University of Kentucky. In April 1957, he received his PhD in Genetics and Plant Education from Oregon State University in Corvallis, Oregon (USA). Dr. Jaff briefly paused his PhD work to return to Iraq where he got married, and returned to campus with his wife to finish his research.

== Early career ==
Upon completion of his college education in the United States, Dr. Jaff returned to Baghdad, Iraq, working in a range of scientific and administrative functions, including heading several agricultural delegations to the Soviet Union, United States of America, Yugoslavia, Romania, Egypt, Syria and Jordan.

Dr. Jaff held various positions in government and industry:

- Director of Field Crop Research Department, Department Of Agriculture, Abu Ghraib College, University of Baghdad (Iraq)
- Member of the Board Of Directors of Rafidain Bank (Iraq)
- Member of the National Insurance Company (Iraq)
- Member of the Board Of Directors of the National Oil Company (Iraq)

Dr. Jaff was appointed as Director-General in the Tobacco Monopoly Administration in Iraq, which was the sole producer, supplier and distributor of tobacco products. On 6 September 1965 Dr. Jaff became Minister of Agriculture, among a small group of Kurds to occupy this high ranking post in the Iraqi government. In 1969 Dr. Jaff became a lecturer at the Faculty of Agriculture at Baghdad University. In 1969, he joined the United Nations Development Program (UNDP) in Somalia, and shortly thereafter, joined the Food and Agriculture Organization (FAO) which led to a twenty year period in Dr. Jaff's career.

== UN career ==
Dr. Jaff joined the United Nations System in 1970 as Senior Agriculture Adviser in the UNDP in Mogadishu, Somalia where he served from 1970 to 1973. He later became the UNDP Resident Coordinator in Somalia and oversaw, among other things, the transition of Somalia's independence from Italy.

In 1974, Dr. Jaff was appointed as Senior Agriculture adviser to UNDP in Cairo, Egypt. He was a member of the UN Transition Team of the return of Al Arish in the Sinai Peninsula to Egypt after the Yom Kippur war between Israel and Egypt. In 1978, FAO established its official representation status in Egypt, and Dr. Jaff was appointed as FAO's first Representative and Head of Mission in Egypt. He remained in Egypt until 1980 at which time he accepted a senior executive role at FAO's Headquarters in Rome, Italy. Dr. Jaff and his family relocated to Rome in 1979, where he was appointed as Chief of Operations for the Middle East, North Africa and Eastern Mediterranean Countries (AGON). He managed a large operational portfolio of FAO's technical assistance projects. Dr. Jaff was later appointed as Director of FAO's Global Operation Division (AGO). From 1991 to 1992, he served as Special Senior Adviser to the Director-General of FAO for Middle East and North Africa affairs prior to retiring from the UN Systems in July 1992.

On 9 May 2004 Ezzedine Salim, President of the Governing Council of Iraq, appointed Dr. Jaff as Iraqi Ambassador to the Rome Based Agencies (RBA) of the United Nations (Food and Agriculture Organization (FAO), World Food Programme (WFP), and International Fund for Agricultural Development (IFAD) ). This post represented Iraq's interests with the RBA, focused on agricultural programs and policies during the rebuilding of Iraq's infrastructure after the second Gulf War. Jaff presented his formal credentials as Ambassador to FAO Director-General Jacques Diouf on November 15, 2004 as part of ongoing diplomatic relations. During his tenure as Ambassador, Dr. Jaff chaired several pertinent Committees as well as retaining membership in the World Food Programme Executive Board.

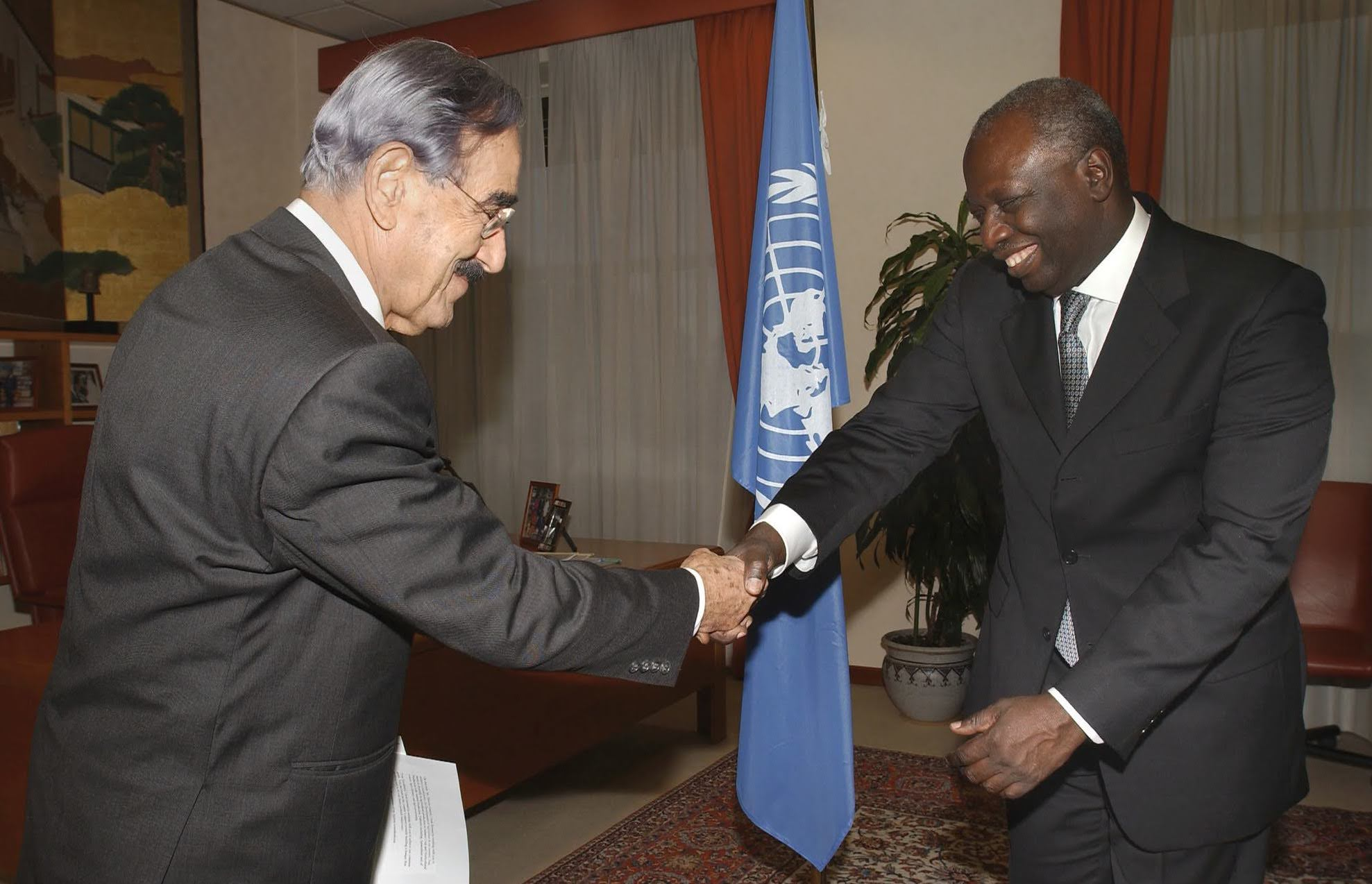
Akram Jaff at FAO with Jacques Diouf, Director General FAO

== Research interests and publications ==
Dr. Jaff also participated in collections of agricultural scientific research, starting with his PhD and onward to in-field studies in his vocation. Dr. Jaff published multiple books and essays about the economy of Kurdistan, in the 1990s, which have been cited in various subsequent papers. Dr. Jaff's work has been cited in PhD dissertations in the field of Kurdish Studies and policy development in the region.

== Retirement years ==
During his retirement years, Dr. Jaff collaborated with author and Baghdad University Professor of History Kamal Ahmad to have his writings on Kurdish history translated to English for publication and distribution to libraries at a collection of American universities.

== Personal life ==
Dr. Jaff was married to Parween Hassan Jaff, from Sulaymaniyah, the daughter of Hassan Begzadeh Jaff, landlord, poet, and member of parliament during the Iraqi monarchy from the Halabja province of Northern Iraq. Dr. Jaff married Parween in a traditional Kurdish wedding in his hometown of Halabja in 1956.

== Death ==
Dr. Akram Jaff died on 21 November 2010, in Erbil, Iraq, after being repatriated from his former home in Rome, Italy.
