= Joanna Palani =

Danish member of Kurdish People's Defence Units

- Born: 1993 (age 32–33); Ramadi, Iraq
- Military career
- Allegiance: Rojava; Kurdistan Region
- Branch: People's Defense Units (YPG); Peshmerga
- Conflicts: War against the Islamic State

Joanna Palani (born 1993) is a Danish woman of Kurdish background who fought for the Kurdish People's Defence Units (YPG) against ISIS, including as a sniper. Palani's family is originally from Kermanshah (Kirmaşan) Iranian Kurdistan, and she was born in a refugee camp in Ramadi in Iraq during the first Gulf War. Her family subsequently got asylum in Denmark when she was still a child. In 2011-2012 she left her life in Denmark to join the Kurdish forces. She was injured in the battle of Kobani in 2014. She became a sniper in the battle of Manbij. She also worked and fought with Peshmerga forces in Iraq after the rise of ISIS. She first went to Rojava in Syria, where she fought with different Kurdish forces in the beginning of Rojava Revolution and she also fought with other Kurdish forces across greater Kurdistan for years. Her family is well-known and has a storied history among the Kurdish people, deeply intertwined with the struggle for Kurdish independence.

She was taken into custody on her return to Denmark. Palani is frequently the target of vicious threats, both online and offline, since her return to Denmark. ISIS placed a bounty of 1 million dollars on her head.

She has published an account of her experience: Freedom Fighter: My War Against ISIS on the Frontline of Syria.
