= Carlos Henry Bosdet =

Electrical engineer

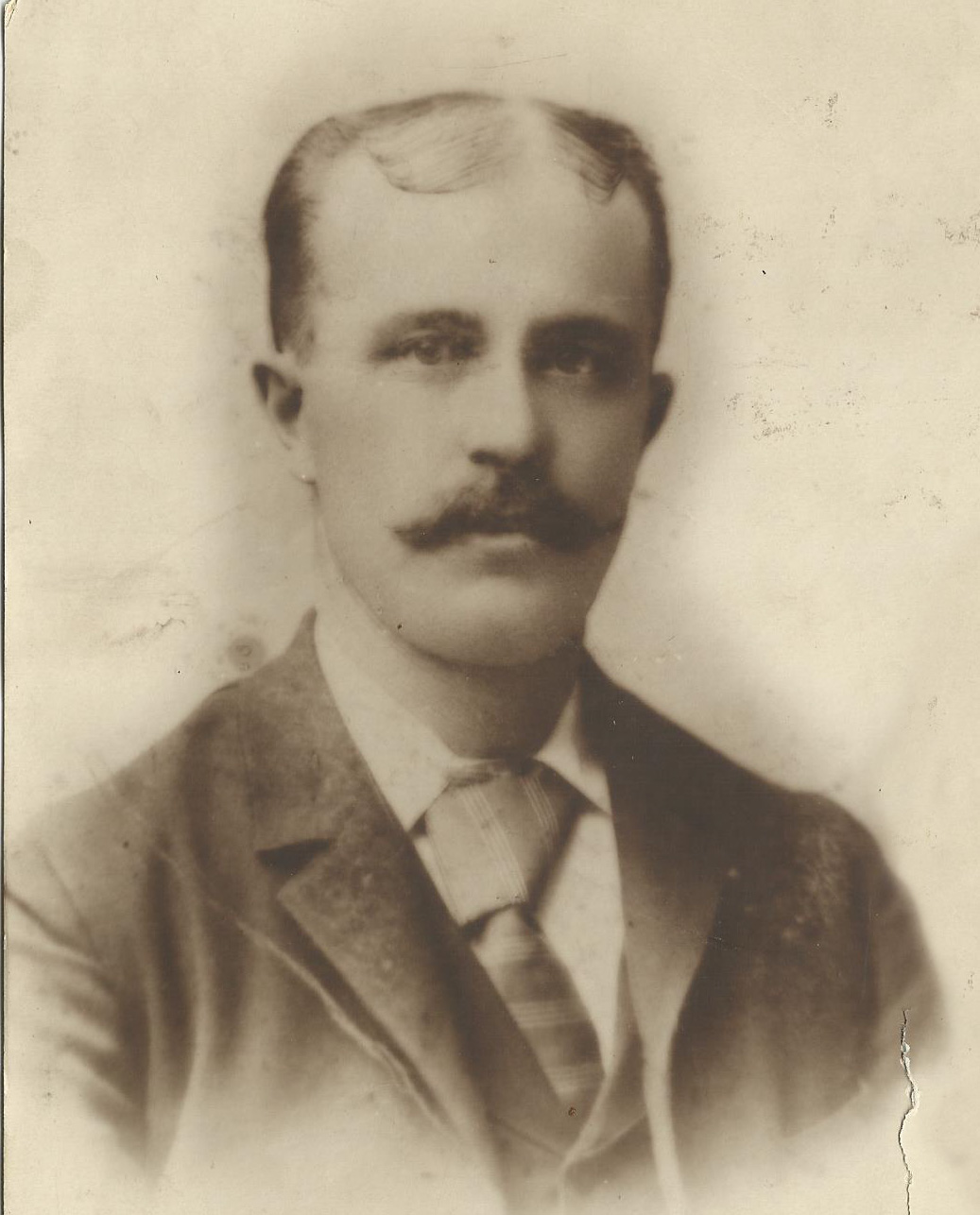
Born Sept. 2, 1857.

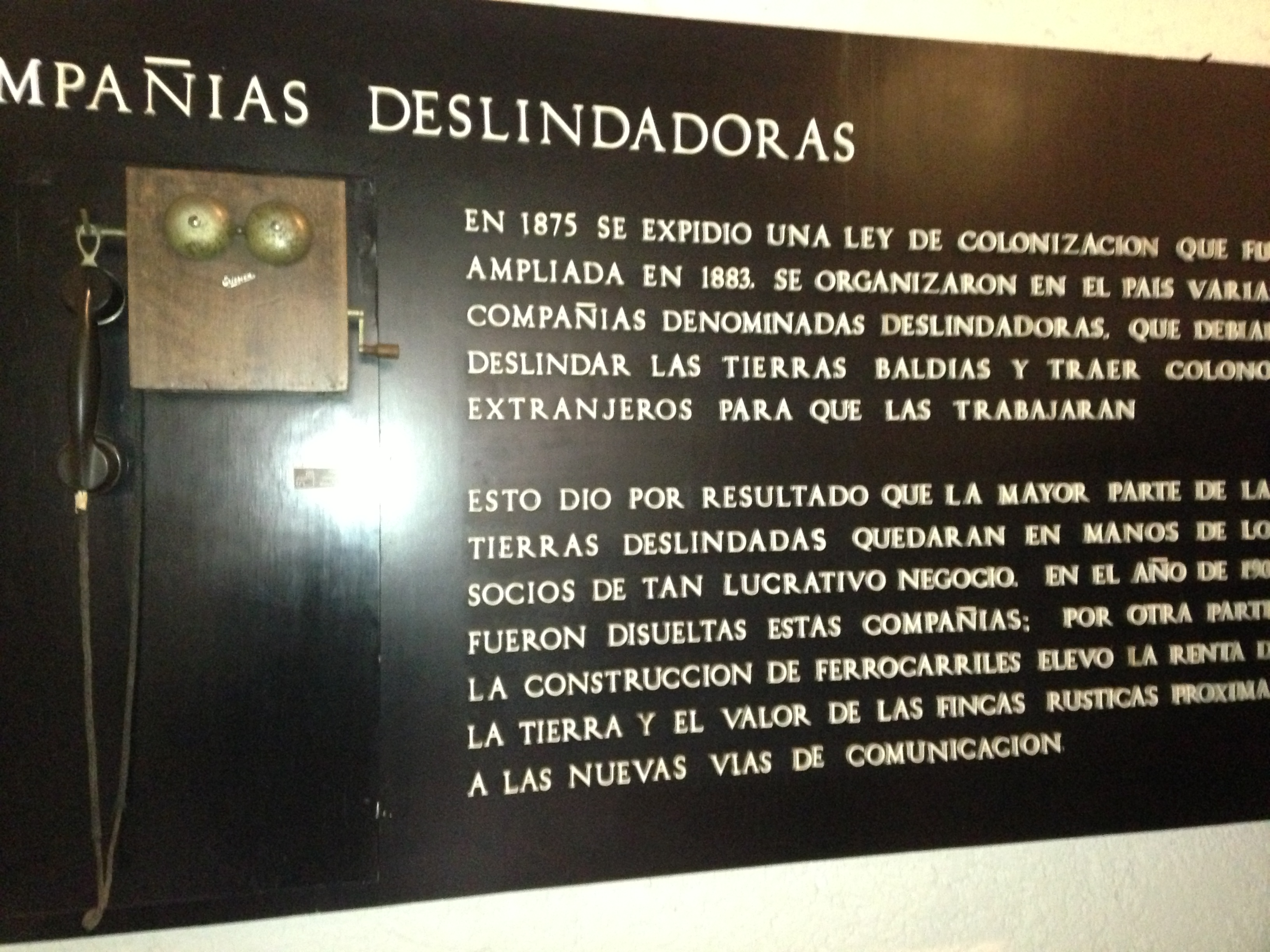
Ericsson phone in the Palace Museum of Cortés in Cuernavaca, Morelos.

Carlos Henry Bosdet Fixott was an electrical engineer, born in 1857. He was the first person to install and introduce the telephone in Mexico during President Porfirio Diaz's term in office.

== Early life ==
Carlos Henry Bosdet Fixott, was born on September 2, 1857, in Arichat, Nova Scotia, his parents were English from the Isle of Jersey. He graduated from McGill University with a degree in electrical engineering.

== Career ==
Bosdet Fixott was hired by the Ericsson Telephone Company, and sent to Mexico. He was sent to Mexico to install the first telephone line connecting Chapultepec Castle with the National Palace of Mexico on February 16, 1878, during the President Porfirio Diaz era. He stayed in Mexico, moving between different states to install telephone lines and by the end of the century there were five thousand units across Mexico. He is credited as bringing the first telephone lines to different states in Mexico, and prompted Ericsson Telephone Company, a Swedish company, to invest more in Mexico.

== Personal life and death ==
Carlos married Susan Miller who he met in Puebla, she was the daughter of an Englishman from Manchester, England. He had three sons- Ernesto (1883), Carlos (1887) and Enrique (1893). He died in 1893, at the age of 36, as the result of complications from a bullfighting wound. His sons stayed in Mexico and some of his descendants continue to live in Mexico today.
