= Osman Pasha Jaff =

Ottoman Ruler

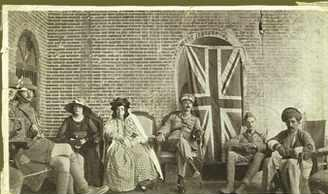
Osman Pasha Jaff

Osman Pasha Jaff, supreme ruler to the Jaff tribe, and an Ottoman ruler in the Mosul vilayet, that contributed to women's suffrage in the Middle East.

In 1888 and 1889, Sultan Abdul Hamid II had Osman replace his more violent brother, Mahmood Pasha Jaff, who was an insurrectionist. Osman Pasha Jaff proved himself to be such a worthy administrator that he received many medals and promotions by the Ottoman Sultan for his endeavors. Osman especially went after the many bandits who roamed the Mesopotamian region of the Ottoman Empire, and plunged the region into anarchy.

Osman Pasha Jaff is the father of Ahmed Mukhtar Jaff (احمد مختار جاف)one of the iconic patriots of Kurds and one of their legendary poets.

Osman and the Jaff tribe were found on both sides of the border as both Ottoman and Persian states trusted him for the security of the region. He was so satisfactory to the Shah of Persia that Iran awarded him in 1894 a sword as an honor.

Osman governed with his wife, Adela Khanem, who was a very skilled administrator to the point of him appointing her kadi of the city of Kalar, presiding over the judicial courts there. During his administration, he passed laws against rape. Adela Jaff was one of the few rulers that were women in the Ottoman Empire. She was even revered by the British because of her acts of mercy towards British captives, who were a part of the Mesopotamian invasion during World War I. They would ultimately give her the title Khan-Bahadur, and she would reign with the British far beyond the death of Osman Pasha Jaff in 1909.
