= Lady Adela =

Princess of the Jaff tribe

- Ruler of the Jaff Tribe
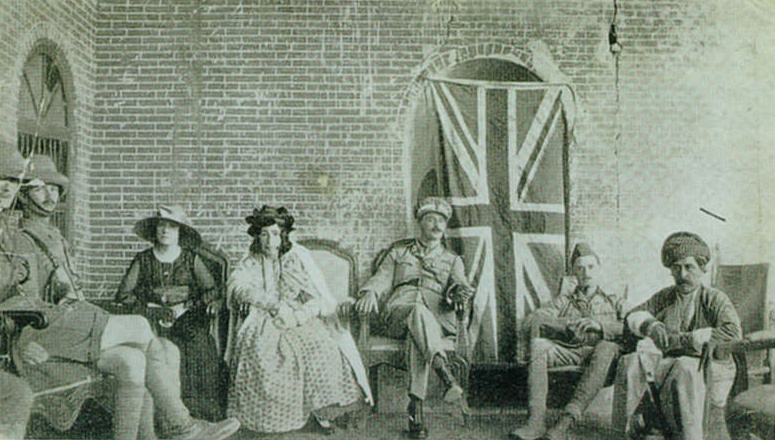
- Lady Adela (center), ruler of Halabja, meeting with British officers in 1919.
- Native name: عديلة خانم
- Other titles: Khan-Bahadur
- Born: Adela Khanem c. 1847
- Died: 1924
- Noble family: Sahibqeran family Jaff Family

Lady Adela Jaff or Adela Khanem, called the Princess of the Brave by the British was a Kurdish ruler of the Jaff tribe and one of the first famous woman leaders in the history of Kurdistan. The Jaff tribe is the biggest tribe in Kurdistan and is native to the Zagros area, which is divided between Iran and Iraq. Adela Khanem was of the famous aristocratic Sahibqeran family, who intermarried with the tribal chiefs of Jaff. Lady Adela exerted great influence in the affairs of Jaff tribe in the Sharazor plain. The Brits appointed her the title “Lady” due to the restoration of trade and law in the region and succeeded in saving the lives of hundreds of British soldiers.

== Biography ==
She was born in 1847, to the ruling family in Sanandaj, second largest city of Iranian Kurdistan. She married Kurdish King Osman Pasha Jaff, whose headquarters was in Halabja. Her husband Osman Pasha Jaff, was a Pasha and she ruled in his place at her husband’s absence. Her father was the grand vizier of Persia and her uncles were grand viziers of the Ottoman Empire and Saudi Arabia. Adela Jaff was one of the few rulers that were women in the region. The British invaded German Ottoman Iraq during World War I and conquered it with the treaty of Mudros in 1917. They wished to give the Kurds Autonomy by setting up the Mosul commission in 1918. They gave Mahmud Barzanji power, but he revolted and launched a campaign to murder all British political officers assigned to each tribe in 1919. She was even revered by the British because of her acts of mercy towards British captives, who were a part of the Mesopotamian invasion during World War I. Adela Khanum Jaff gave all British political officers refugee within her houses. This is when Adela Khanum defended, supported, fed, and gave the British refuge.Then they would ultimately give her the title Khan-Bahadur by Major Fraser, called her Princess of the Brave, and she would reign with the British far beyond the death of Osman Pasha Jaff in 1909.

The Jaff dialect (called Jaffi) is part of Sorani, a south-southeastern branch of Kurdish language family. The region inhabited by this tribe is southwest of Sanandaj all the way to Javanroud, and also areas around the city of Sulaimaniyah in Southern Kurdistan. Once nomadic, the Jaffs have more recently settled into a predominantly agricultural way of life and are often known as the most educated and intellectual tribe of the Kurds.

== Writings about her ==
Gertrude Bell, British politician and writer, describes Adela Khanem in a letter in 1921 as follows: " The feature of Halabja is 'Adlah Khanum the great Jaff Beg Zadah lady, mother of Ahmad Beg. She is the widow of Kurdish King Osman Pasha Jaff, sometime dead, and continues to rule the Jaff as much as she can and intrigue more than you would think anyone could, and generally behave as great Kurdish ladies do behave. She has often written to me, feeling, I've no doubt, that we must be birds of a feather, and I hastened to call on her after lunch. She is a striking figure in her gorgeous Kurdish clothes with jet black curls (dyed, I take it) falling down her painted cheeks from under her huge headdress. We carried on in Persian, a very complimentary talk in the course of which I managed to tell them how well 'Iraq was doing under Faisal and to assure them that all we wished was that our two children, 'Iraq and Kurdistan, should live in peace and friendship with one another". Vladimir Minorsky has reported his meeting with Lady Adela in the region of Halabja in 1913.

Major Soane wrote about her in his book To Mesopotamia and Kurdistan in Disguise: "a woman unique in Islam, in the power she possesses, and the efficacy with which she uses the weapons in her hands.... In a remote corner of the Turkish Empire, which decays and retrogrades, is one little spot, which, under the rule of a Kurdish woman has risen from a village to be a town, and one hill-side, once barren, now sprinkled with gardens; and these are in a measure renovations of the ancient state of these parts."

== See also ==
- Kurdistan
- Kurdish women
- Jaff tribe

== Notes ==
- Minorsky, The Tribes of Western Iran, The Journal of the Royal Anthropological Institute of Great Britain and Ireland, pp. 73–80, 1945.
- Ely Banister Soane, Report on the Sulaimania district of Kurdistan. 1910
- Ely Banister Soane, Notes on the Southern Tribes of Kurdistan, Civil commissioner, Baghdad. 1918
- Personalities in Kurdistan, Civil Commissioner, Baghdad. 1918

== Bibliography ==
- (David K. Fieldhouse 2002)
- David K. Fieldhouse (9 February 2002). Kurds, Arabs and Britons: The Memoir of Col. W.A. Lyon in Kurdistan, 1918–1945. I.B.Tauris. ISBN 978-1-86064-613-3.
