= Mohamed Pasha Jaff =

Kurdish ruler

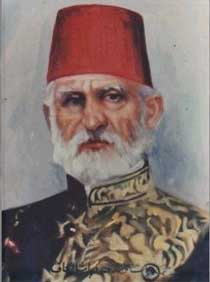
- Mohamed Pasha Jaff
- Born: 1714; Kurdish region (between Sanandaj and Javanroud)
- Died: Unknown
- Occupations: Nobleman, leader of Jaff tribe
- Known for: Leader of the Jaff tribe, builder of Sherwana Castle
- Notable work: Sherwana Castle

Mohamed Pasha Jaff (1714) was a Kurdish nobleman and the supreme leader of the Kurdish Jaff tribe, a tribe living in the region located between southwest of Sanandaj and Javanroud, and also areas around the city of Sulaimaniyah. Mohamed Pasha is notable for being the builder of the Sherwana Castle.

== History ==
Mohamed Pasha Jaff received the noble title of Pasha from the Ottoman Empire.

At 20 years old, Mohamed Pasha settled in Sherwana Castle in Kalar region in Iraqi Kurdistan. His determination to protect the Jaff tribe led to several clashes between him against the Qajars and Ottomans. Today, the Jaff tribe has three million people.

The pasha was also known for having strong convictions and a love for knowledge, he reportedly sent various explorations to the American continent.

== See also ==
- Mahmud Pasha Jaff

== Bibliography ==
(Joseph Pierre Ferrier 1856)

- Joseph Pierre Ferrier (1856). Caravan Journeys and Wanderings in Persia, Afghanistan, Turkistan, and Beloochistan: With Historical Notices of the Countries Lying Between Russia and India. J. Murray. ISBN 9780598015839.
