= Government of the Count of Toreno =

Government of Spain

- Government of Spain
- 1834-1835
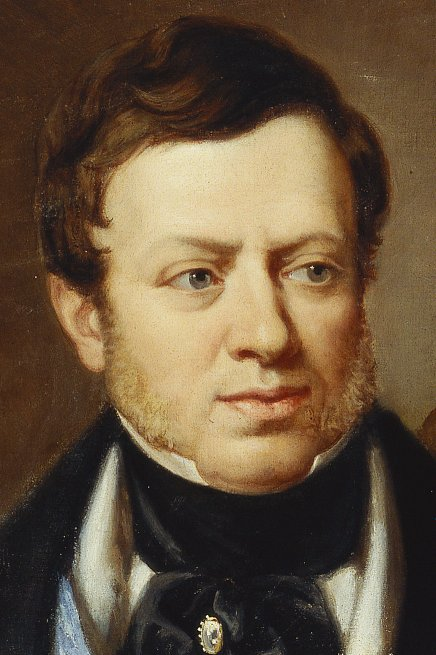
- Count of Toreno
- Date formed: 7 June 1835
- Date dissolved: 14 September 1835

People and organisations
- Regent: Maria Christina of the Two Sicilies
- Prime Minister: José María Queipo de Llano
- No. of ministers: 6 (Note: Does not include the prime minister.)
- Total no. of members: 6
- Member party: Moderate; Progressive (since 13 June)
- Status in legislature: Majority (single-party)
- Opposition party: Progressive (until 13 June)

History
- Election: 1834
- Predecessor: Martínez de la Rosa II
- Successor: Ricardo de Álava

The government of the Count of Toreno was formed on 15 January 1834, following José María Queipo de Llano's appointment as prime minister by Regent María Cristina de Borbón. It succeeded the second government of Martínez de la Rosa and was the government of Spain from 7 June 1835 to 14 September 1835, a total of 100 days, or 3 months and 8 days.

The cabinet comprised members of the Moderate Party and, since 13 June, it also included some members of the Progressive Party.

== Development ==
With the resignation of Martínez de la Rosa, the queen regent María Cristina appointed on 7 June 1835 José María Queipo de Llano, Count of Toreno, as the new Prime Minister. Queipo de Llano had served as Minister of Finance in the previous government, and he kept this portfolio on an interim basis after his appointment as Prime Minister.

In foreign policy, the Government signed a treaty on 18 June 1835 with the United Kingdom concerning the slave trade, by which Spain was required to comply with the agreements of 1817. Spain, however, due to internal and economic problems, agreed only to prohibit the slave trade, but not slavery itself. The treaty included two main points:

- Abolition of slavery.
- It would be permitted for the British navy (and vice versa) to stop and inspect any ship flying the Spanish flag suspected of involvement in the slave trade.

On 10 September 1835 the Treaty of Free Navigation of the Douro was ratified between the kingdoms of Spain and Portugal.

The new government had one notable success: on 16 July 1835 government forces won the Battle of Mendigorría over the Carlist army, their first significant victory.

The decision to maintain the moderate policies of his predecessor won Queipo de Llano the opposition of the progressive liberals. This was despite the fact that the new prime minister launched an attack on property held by the Roman Catholic church, which was a move favoured by his radical opponents. The pressure the opposition exerted on the Government resulted in a series of rebellions, that eventually led to the resignation of the Prime Minister. The insurrection broke out in Cádiz, a city renowned for its liberalism, on 10 July and from there spread to Málaga and Granada. Soon afterwards, in the main cities (Madrid, Barcelona, Zaragoza, Valencia) provincial revolutionary juntas were formed and, later, territorial ones.

Queipo de Llano responded to the rebellions by bringing in Juan Álvarez Mendizábal as Finance Minister. Mendizábal had a reputation for revolutionary zeal, and had to be called out of exile in London, but this late move to the left was insufficient. The movement of the progressives found an echo in broad sectors of society (including lawyers, businessmen, landowners, members of the military), and also enjoyed the support of the urban militias [es]. Faced with this situation, the Count of Toreno resigned on 14 September 1835. Juan Álvarez Mendizábal became his successor.

== Composition ==
Ministry	Image	Name	Start	Finish
Prime Minister		José María Queipo de Llano	7 June 1835	14 September 1835
State		José María Queipo de Llano (Interim: 7 June - 13 June 1835)	7 June 1835	14 September 1835
Grace and Justice		Juan de la Dehesa	7 June 1835	13 June 1835
Grace and Justice		Manuel García Herreros	13 June 1835	14 September 1835
War		Gerónimo Valdés	7 June 1835	13 June 1835
War		Valentín Ferraz (Interim)	7 June 1835	13 June 1835
War		Pedro Agustín Girón	13 June 1835	28 August 1835
War		Prudencio de Guadalfajara (Interim)	28 August 1835	14 September 1835
Finance		José María Queipo de Llano	7 June 1835	13 June 1835
Finance		Juan Álvarez Mendizabal	13 June 1835	14 September 1835
Finance		José María Queipo de Llano (Interim: 13 June - 6 September 1835)	13 June 1835	14 September 1835
Navy		José Vázquez Figueroa	13 June 1835	13 June 1835
Navy		Miguel Ricardo de Álava	13 June 1835	28 August 1835
Navy		Pedro Agustín Girón (Interim)	13 June 1835	28 August 1835
Navy		José Sartorio	28 August 1835	14 September 1835
General Development of the Kingdom		Diego Medrano	13 June 1835	13 June 1835
General Development of the Kingdom		Juan Álvarez Guerra	13 June 1835	28 August 1835
General Development of the Kingdom		Manuel de la Riva Herrera	28 August 1835	14 September 1835
General Development of the Kingdom		Ángel Vallejo Villalón (Interim: 18 August - 14 September 1835)	28 August 1835	14 September 1835
