= Second government of Francisco Martínez de la Rosa =

Government of Spain

2nd government of Francisco Martínez de la Rosa
- Government of Spain
- 1834-1835
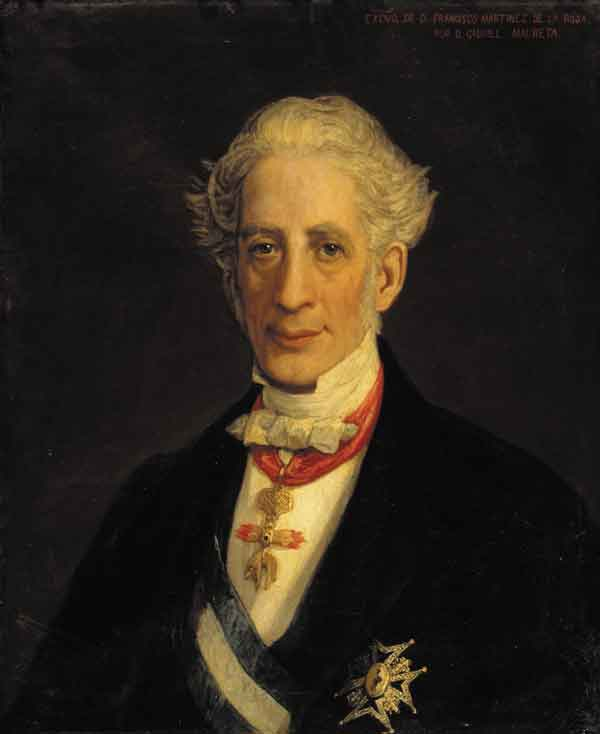
- Martínez de la Rosa
- Date formed: 15 January 1834
- Date dissolved: 7 June 1835

People and organisations
- Regent: Maria Christina of the Two Sicilies
- Prime Minister: Francisco Martínez de la Rosa
- No. of ministers: 6 (Note: Does not include the prime minister.)
- Total no. of members: 6
- Member party: Moderate
- Status in legislature: Majority (single-party)
- Opposition party: Progressive

History
- Election: 1834
- Predecessor: Absolutism
- Successor: Toreno

The second government government of Francisco Martínez de la Rosa was formed on 15 January 1834, following the latter's appointment as prime minister by Regent María Cristina de Borbón. It is considered the first government not presided by the monarch. The cabinet was composed of moderate liberals who would end up forming the Moderate Party.

== Development ==
After the death of King Ferdinand VII on September 29, 1833, the regent María Cristina kept in power the reformist politicians [es] who had served in the last stage of her husband’s reign, led by Francisco Cea Bermúdez, Secretary of State. The objective was to maintain the support of the reformists for her daughter, Queen Isabella II, a minor at that time, against the pretensions of the absolutists grouped around the figure of Infante Carlos María Isidro, brother of Ferdinand VII, who did not recognize the rights of his niece to occupy the throne. (see First Carlist War#National politics)

The reforms carried out by Cea Bermúdez had an administrative character to please the royalists who had not passed to the Carlist side, but their limited political content did not satisfy the liberals. With the outbreak of the First Carlist War on October 6, the regent needed the support of the liberals, but Cea Bermúdez’s opposition prevented it. On December 25, a manifesto was produced by the Captain General of Catalonia, Manuel Llauder [es], against the political immobility of the Secretary of State. After these events, the regent yielded to the pressure and forced Cea Bermúdez to resign on January 15, 1834, being replaced by the moderate liberal Francisco Martínez de la Rosa.

The new government focused its actions on trying to end the war. For this, the convents whose members supported the pretender Carlos María Isidro were suppressed, a general amnesty was granted, and the creation of the Urban Militia [es] was approved. In addition, an attempt was made to provide the State with a political element that would strengthen it against the Carlists, the Royal Statute, promulgated on April 10, 1834 in the manner of a "granted charter" [es]. In this way, an attempt was made to appease all political forces, by yielding to the requests to approve a “constitution,” but without going to the extreme of restoring that of 1812.

Another of the decisions of the Government of Martínez de la Rosa was the search for international support for the Isabeline cause. However, the matter was difficult. As López-Cordón states, the “disqualification of Spain as a European power, the result of the unfortunate foreign policy of Fernando VII” left the country isolated from the rest of Europe, and only France and Great Britain and the countries dependent on them recognized Isabel II as legitimate heir. Spain would then sign an alliance with Great Britain and France, to which Portugal would join, a country that was living in a very similar situation with the Liberal Wars. On April 22, 1834, the so-called Quadruple Alliance was formed among these countries, and this would mean Spanish dependence to France and Great Britain regarding foreign policy. This alliance was defined as: “When France and England agree, march with them; when not, abstain.”

The Government of Martínez de la Rosa also had to confront the numerous problems derived from the internal weakness brought about by the civil war. In July 1834 there was a cholera epidemic in Madrid and, despite the Government’s measures, deaths occurred in large numbers. The popular masses, encouraged by false rumors, unloaded their anger over the situation on the city’s friars accused of poisoning the wells and of supporting the Carlist pretender, with killings and burning of convents taking place. In April 1835 a military uprising occurred against the Government, with the Royal House of the Post Office being occupied. The Government sent the Army to quell the uprising under the command of the Captain General of Madrid [es], José de Canterac. The rebellion was suppressed, but among the casualties was the Captain General himself.

With the institutional reform derived from the Royal Statute, the progressive liberals [es] entered the political scene and constituted a pressure group against the moderate policy of Martínez de la Rosa. These liberals defended the rights of the citizen, freedom of the press, the restitution of the national militia, and the subordination of the Executive to the Cortes.These measures were not to the liking of either the moderates or the queen regent, and thus did not prosper in the Cortes. However, the progressives took the debate to the street through political circles and the press, thereby increasing pressure on the Government.

Finally, the impossibility of ending the war and the pressure of the progressives led Martínez de la Rosa to close the Cortes on May 29 and resign on June 7, 1835.

== Composition ==
Ministry	Image	Name	Start	Finish
Prime Minister		Francisco Martínez de la Rosa	15 January 1834	7 June 1835
State		Francisco Martínez de la Rosa	15 January 1834	7 June 1835
Grace and Justice		Nicolás María Garelli	15 January 1834	17 February 1835
Grace and Justice		Juan de la Dehesa	15 January 1834	7 June 1835
War		Antonio Remón Zarco del Valle	15 January 1834	2 November 1834
War		Manuel Llauder	2 November 1834	17 February 1835
War		Francisco Martínez de la Rosa (Interim: 2 november 1834 - 17 February 1835)	2 November 1834	17 February 1835
War		Gerónimo Valdés	17 February 1835	7 June 1835
War		Valentín Ferraz (Interim)	17 February 1835	7 June 1835
Finance		José Aranalde (Interim)	15 January 1834	7 February 1834
Finance		José Imaz Baquedano	7 February 1834	18 June 1834
Finance		José María Queipo de Llano	18 June 1834	7 June 1835
Navy		José Vázquez Figueroa	15 January 1834	7 June 1835
General Development of the Kingdom		Francisco Javier de Burgos	15 January 1834	17 April 1834
General Development of the Kingdom		José María Moscoso	17 April 1834	17 February 1835
General Development of the Kingdom		Nicolás María Garelli (Interim: 17 April - 4 May 1834)	17 April 1834	17 February 1835
General Development of the Kingdom		Diego Medrano	17 February 1875	7 June 1835
