= 1822 Spanish general election =

← 1820	October – December 1822	1834 →

All 203 seats of the Congress of Deputies 102 seats needed for a majority
- Turnout: NA
- Spanish Congress of Deputies, after the election
Prime Minister before election
Francisco Martínez de la Rosa
Independent
Prime Minister after election
Evaristo Fernández San Miguel y Valledor
Independent

General elections to the Cortes Generales were held in Spain in 1822. At stake were all 203 seats in the Congress of Deputies.

== History ==
The 1822 elections were the second ones since the 1820 revolution. The elections were held under the Spanish Constitution of 1812. 3,215,460 people were eligible to vote (universal male suffrage), out of a population of 11,661,865.

== Constituencies ==
A majority voting system was used for the election, with 33 multi-member constituencies and various single-member ones.

== Results ==
Party	Seats
Independents	203
Total	203

Almost all MPs were liberals, mainly from the radical veinteañista or exaltada faction.
