= 1820 Spanish general election =

← 1813	April - May 1820	1822 →

All 203 seats of the Congress of Deputies 102 seats needed for a majority
- Turnout: NA
- Spanish Congress of Deputies, after the election

General elections to the Cortes Generales were held in Spain in 1820. At stake were all 203 seats in the Congress of Deputies.

== History ==
The 1820 elections were the first ones since the 1820 revolution. The elections were held under the Spanish Constitution of 1812.

== Constituencies ==
A majority voting system was used for the election, with 33 multi-member constituencies and various single-member ones.

== Results ==
Party	Seats
Independents	203
Total	203

Most MPs were liberals, mainly from the moderate (or doceañista) faction.
