= Miguel Ricardo de Álava =

Spanish general (1770–1843)

The Most Excellent Miguel Ricardo de Álava KCB MWO
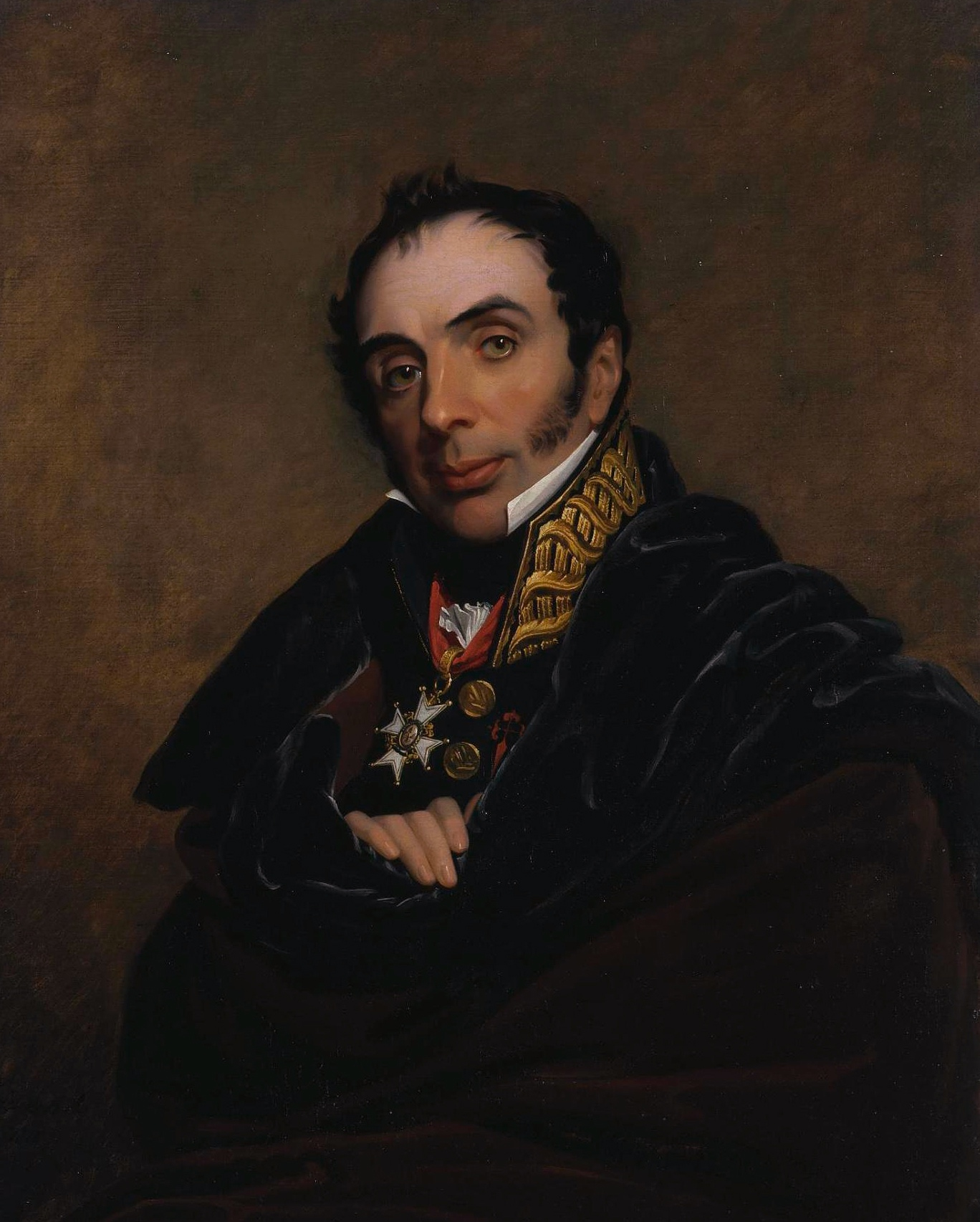
- Portrait by George Dawe, 1818

Prime Minister of Spain
- In office 14 September 1835 – 25 September 1835
- Monarch: Isabella II
- Preceded by: The Count of Toreno
- Succeeded by: Juan Álvarez Mendizábal

Personal details
- Born: 7 July 1770 Vitoria-Gasteiz, Álava, Spain
- Died: 14 July 1843 (aged 73) Barèges, France

Military service
- Rank: Brigadier General
- Battles/wars: War of the Third Coalition; Battle of Trafalgar; Peninsular War; Battle of Bussaco; Siege of Ciudad Rodrigo; Siege of Badajoz; Battle of Salamanca; Battle of Vitoria; Hundred Days; Battle of Waterloo

Miguel Ricardo de Álava y Esquivel KCB MWO (7 July 1770 – 14 July 1843) was a Spanish general and statesman who served as Prime Minister of Spain in 1835. He was born in the Basque Country, at Vitoria-Gasteiz, in 1770. Álava holds the distinction of having been present at both Trafalgar and Waterloo, fighting against the British at the former and with them at the latter.

Alava served as a naval aide-de-camp during the time of Spain's alliance with France but switched sides in 1808 when Napoleon invaded Spain. The Spanish Cortes appointed him commissary (military attaché) at the British Army Headquarters, and Wellesley, the future Duke of Wellington, who regarded him with great favour, made him one of his aides-de-camp. Before the close of the campaign, he had risen to the rank of brigadier-general. During the Waterloo Campaign in 1815, Alava was the Spanish ambassador to The Hague at the court of King William I of the Netherlands, which allowed him to attend the Duchess of Richmond's ball and to be at Wellington's side during the Battle of Waterloo.

== Early life ==
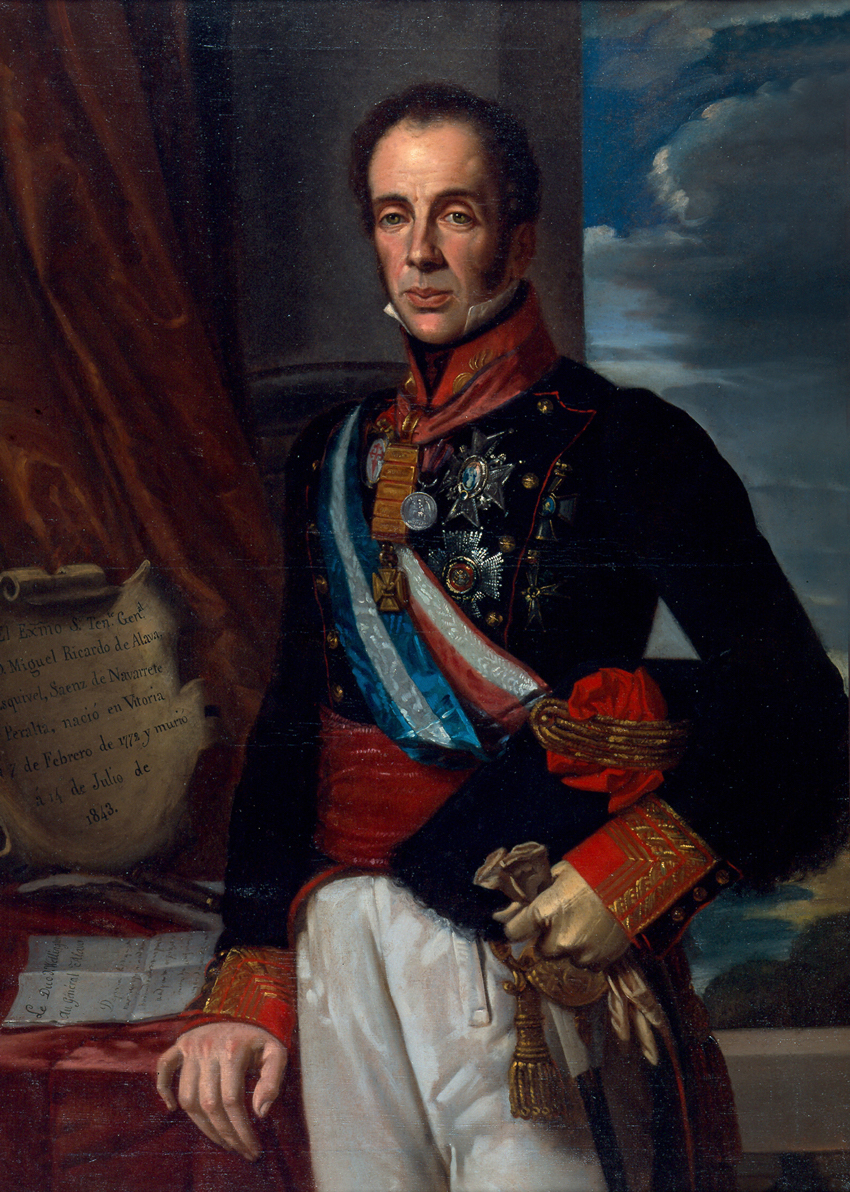
Portrait of Álava, Museo de Bellas Artes de Álava

Born into a noble family of naval tradition, he was the son of Pedro Jacinto de Álava y Navarrete and María Manuela de Esquível y Peralta. His uncle was Ignacio María de Álava, renowned officer who became the Captain general of the Navy in 1817. He married his cousin María Loreto de Arriola y Equível, a grandchild of the Marquesses of Legarda, in 1813. Between 1781 and 1790 he completed his studies at the Vergara Seminary, an institution dedicated to the education of sons of noblemen run by the Real Sociedad Bascongada de Amigos del País.

In 1785, at age 13, he entered the Infantry Regiment of Seville n. 11 as a cadet, led at the time by his other uncle, José de Álava, reaching the rank of second lieutenant in 1787. After his time in the infantry, and coinciding with the end of his studies, he entered the Navy in 1790, possibly attracted by the distinguished figure of his uncle, Ignacio Maria de Álava. He joined different ships from which he participated in multiple military actions, including the siege of Ceuta, siege of Toulon and various engagements in Italy, which, together with his well-connected family, allowed him to rapidly rise through the ranks. By 1794, he was already a frigate lieutenant.

Embarked with his uncle Ignacio in 1795 on an expedition that sought to travel around the world, he remained in South America until 1800. Álava returned to Spain following orders he had received three years earlier, but was captured at sea by the British. He was released several months later, and in 1801 he was back in Spain. In 1802, he was posted to Cádiz, where he was promoted to lieutenant of the ship. On his return to Cádiz in 1805, he was assigned to the fleet commanded by Admiral Gravina. After the expedition to Martinique, conceived by Napoleon as a diversionary maneuver for the Royal Navy, he intervened in the Finisterre skirmish. On 21 October he participated in the Battle of Trafalgar under the orders of Gravina aboard the Príncipe de Asturias while his uncle Ignacio captained the Santa Ana. After the battle, he would be promoted once again.

== War of the Third Coalition ==
Álava served first in the Navy, and had risen to be captain of a frigate when he transferred into the army, receiving corresponding rank. He was present as a Marine at the Battle of Trafalgar on board the 112-gun Santa Ana, which was the flagship of his uncle, Admiral Ignacio Álava.

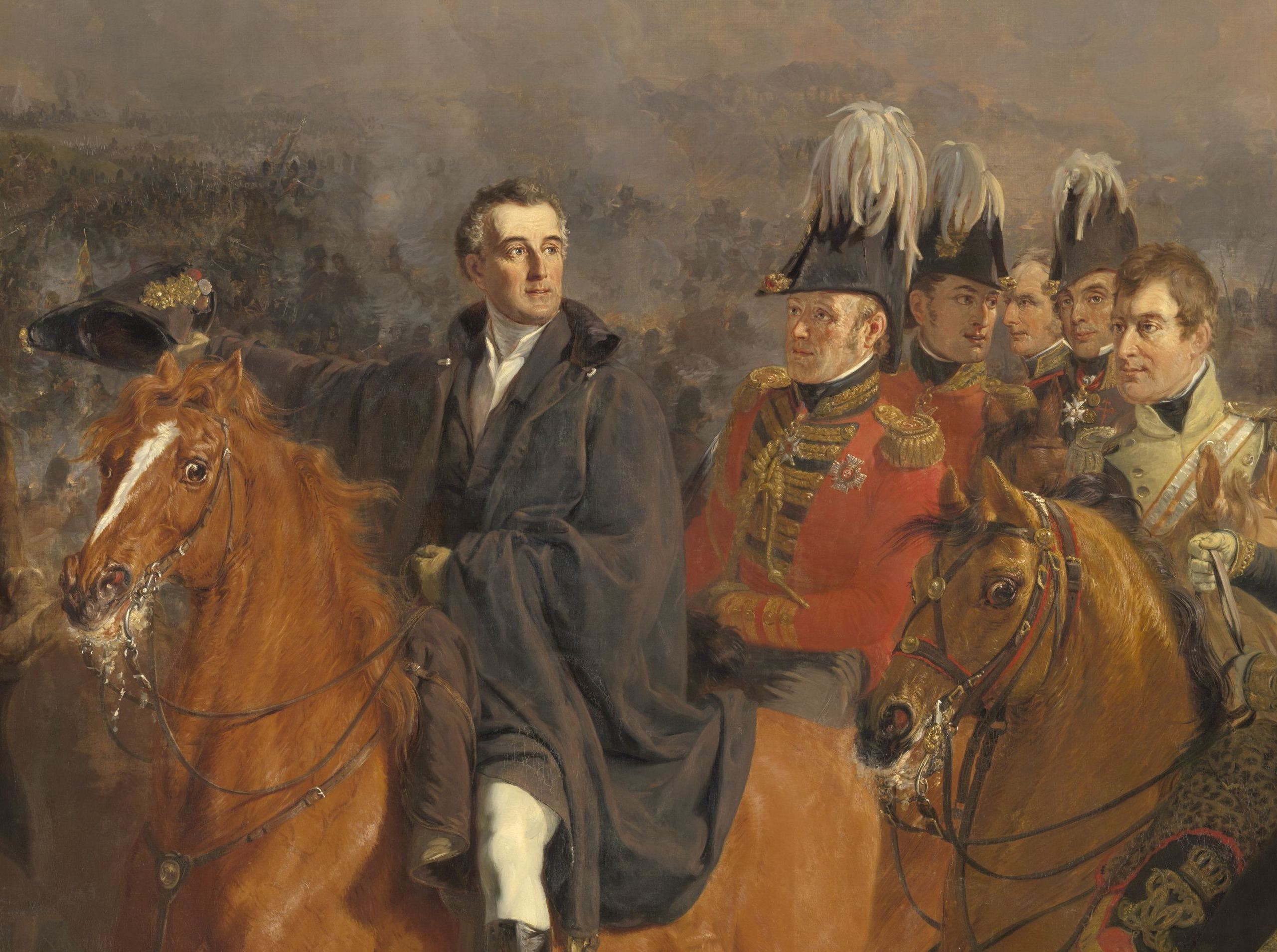
The Battle of Waterloo by Jan Willem Pieneman, 1824. The Duke of Wellington leads his generals at the Battle of Waterloo. Álava, with the Order of Santiago in his chest, is the second from the right

== Peninsular War ==
At the assembly of Bayonne in 1808, he was one of the most prominent of those who accepted the new constitution from Joseph Bonaparte as King of Spain. After the national rising against French aggression, and the defeat of General Dupont at Bailen in 1808, Álava joined the national independence party, who were fighting in alliance with the British forces in the peninsula. At the end of January 1810 he was ordered to move to Portugal in order to communicate Wellington the difficult military situation in that they were against the French. During this stay a friendship between Wellington and Alava was created, to the point that the Duke had him remain as delegate of the Spanish forces in the British units. He was promoted to brigadier by express recommendation of Wellington. He saw action in the battles of Salamanca, Vitoria, Bussaco and at the Siege of Ciudad Rodrigo, as well as taking part in the storming of Badajoz. For his service in the Peninsula he was made an honorary Knight Commander of the Order of the Bath.

== Hundred Days ==
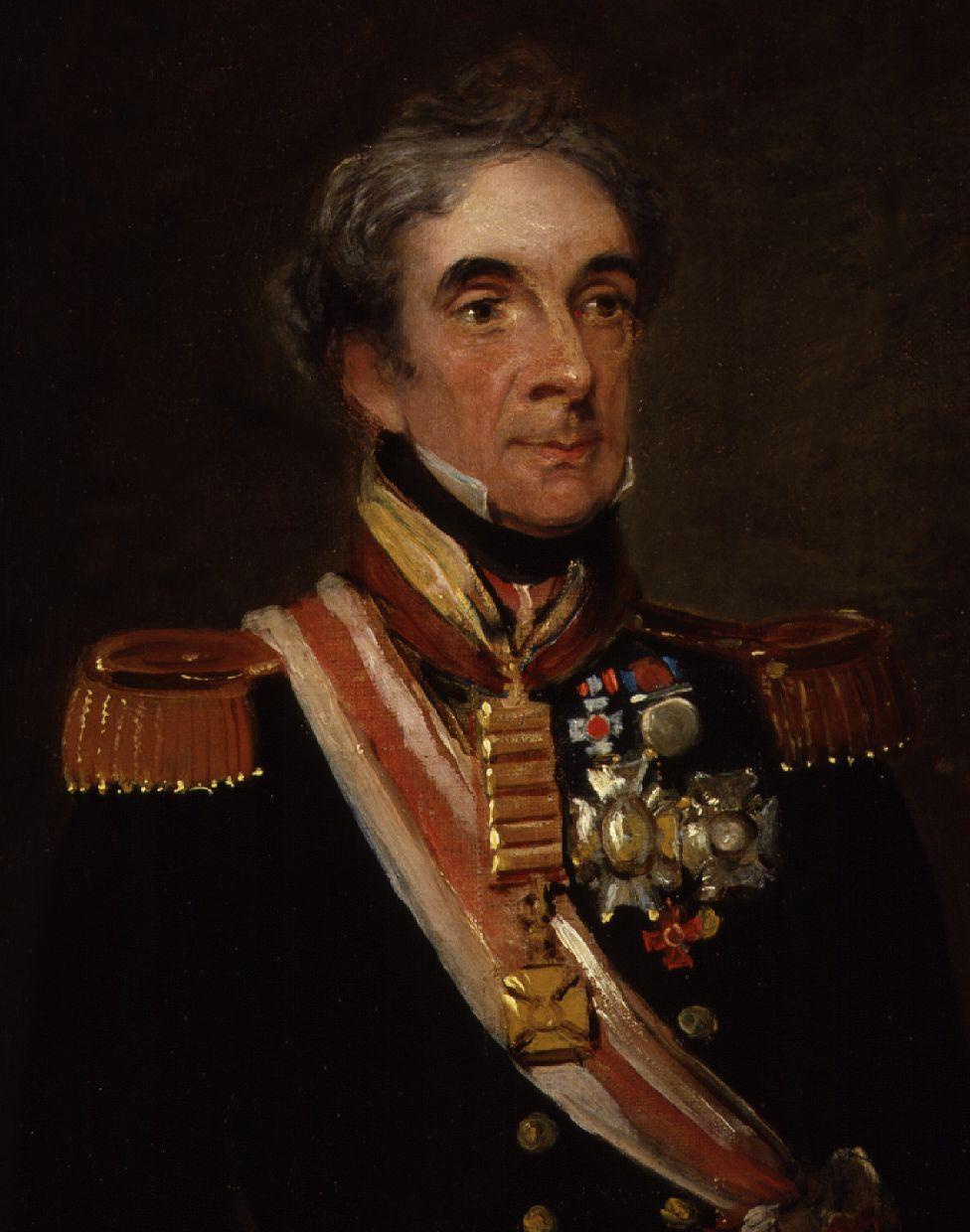
c. 1830–1840 portrait of Álava by William Salter

On the restoration of Ferdinand, Álava was cast into prison, but the influence of his uncle Ethenard, the Inquisitor, and of Wellington secured his speedy release. He soon contrived to gain the favour of the King, who appointed him ambassador to The Hague in 1815. As a result of this, he was present at the Battle of Waterloo with Wellington's staff. Álava stuck close to the Duke during the Battle. Like Wellington, and unlike many of his staff, Álava survived the battle without sustaining any wound although Wellington and his staff were in the thick of the action, with the Duke declaring to Alava: "The hand of Almighty God has been upon me this day". Álava is presumed to have been the only man on the Coalition side who was present at both Waterloo and Trafalgar. (Note: Christopher Summerville mentions that the French General Antoine Drouot was also present at both battles, and Bernard Cornwell has pointed out that at least one battalion of French soldiers present at Waterloo had served as marines at Trafalgar.)

== Politician and diplomat ==
On the breaking out of the revolution of 1820, he was chosen by the province of Álava to represent it in the Cortes, where he became conspicuous in the party of the Exaltados, and in 1822 was made President. In the latter year, he fought with the militia under Francisco Ballesteros and Pablo Morillo to maintain the authority of the Cortes against the rebels. When the French invested Cádiz, Álava was commissioned by the Cortes to treat with the Duc d'Angoulême, and the negotiations resulted in the restoration of Ferdinand, who pledged himself to a liberal policy. No sooner had the King regained power, however, than he ceased to hold himself bound by his promises, and Álava found it necessary to retire first to Gibraltar and then to England. There, he was given a house on the Duke of Wellington's Hampshire estate Stratfield Saye and introduced to his bank Coutts: "This is my friend, and as long as I have any money with your house, let him have it to any amount he thinks proper to draw for".

On the death of Ferdinand, he returned to Spain, and espousing the cause of Maria Christina against Don Carlos was appointed ambassador to London in 1834, and to Paris in 1835. Proposed as Prime Minister in September 1835, he rejected his nomination. After the insurrection of La Granja he refused to sign the Spanish Constitution of 1837, declaring himself tired of taking new oaths, and was consequently obliged to retire to France, where he died at Barèges in 1843.

== Legacy ==
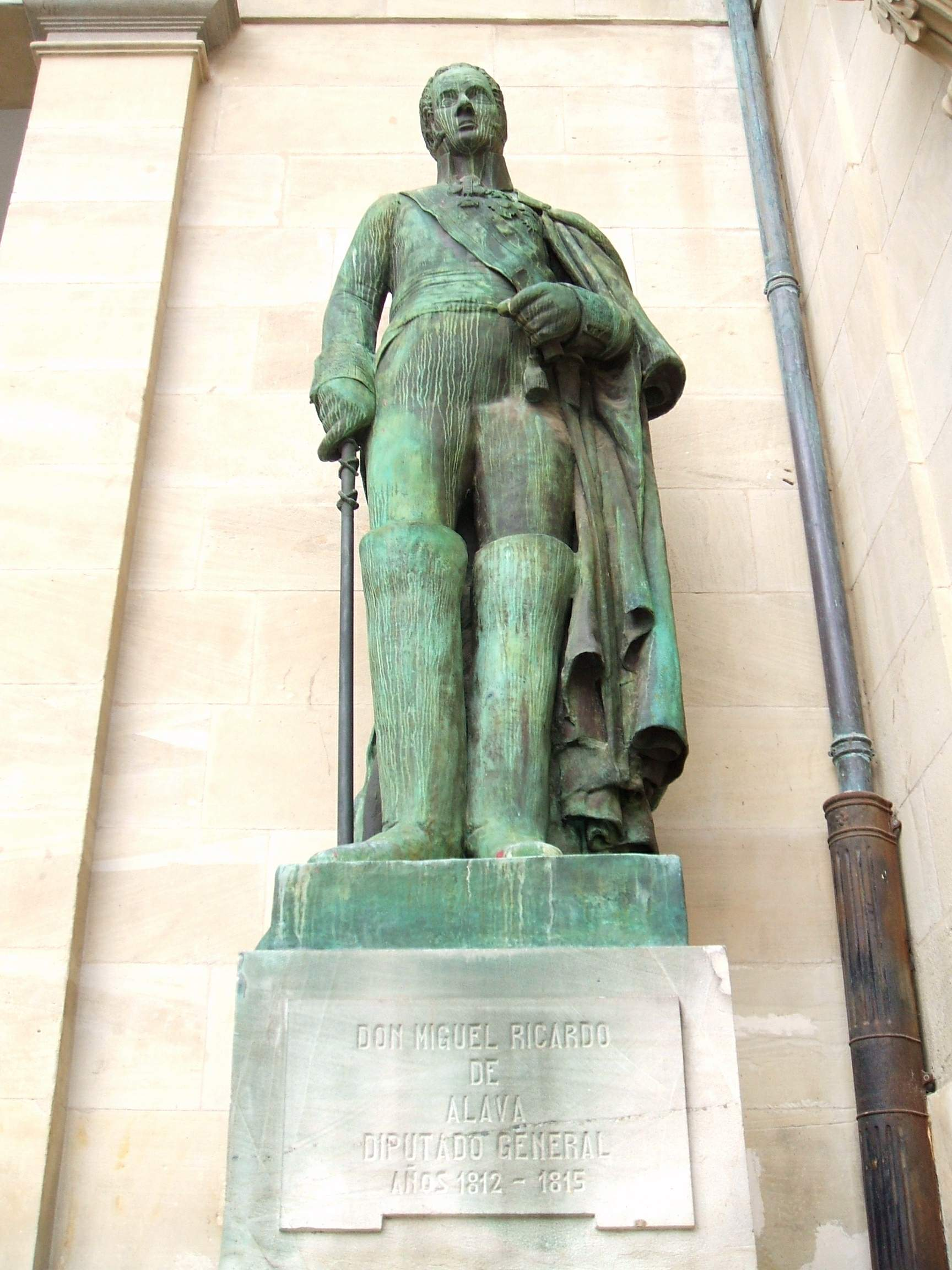
Sculpture of Álava in Vitoria-Gasteiz

Both the relationships established with high-ranking military personnel during the Peninsular War and his diplomatic work as ambassador in London and Paris gave Álava access to a wide network of prominent contacts that, in some cases, went beyond the strictly professional sphere. Thus, in September 1813, William II of the Netherlands, at the time Prince of Orange, with whom he fought during the Napoleonic campaigns, congratulated him on his impending marriage and asked him, in a relaxed tone, to invite him to the ceremony, which Álava happily did. The French queen consort, María Amalia, wrote to him about her daughter's future wedding and other family concerns. Nonetheless, it was the Duke of Wellington who was probably Álava's greatest admirer and friend, who gained the Iron Duke's trust when he served as his aide-de-camp during the fight against the French.

Frequent and honourable mention of Álava is made in Napier's History of the Peninsular War, and his name is often met both in lives of the Duke of Wellington and in his correspondence. The Spanish novelist Ildefonso Arenas wrote a historical novel about the intervention of General Álava as Wellington's aide-de-camp in the Battle of Waterloo, Álava en Waterloo, published in Barcelona in 2012. There are currently three monuments dedicated to him, namely the Monument to the Battle of Vitoria in Plaza de la Virgen Blanca and two statues, at the Diputación Foral de Álava and Museum of the Armoury, all of them in Vitoria, Spain.

== Notes ==
Political offices
Preceded by The Count of Toreno	Prime Minister of Spain; 14 September 1835 – 4 October 1835	Succeeded by Juan Álvarez Mendizábal
Preceded by The Count of Toreno	Minister of State; 14 September 1835 – 4 October 1835	Succeeded by Juan Álvarez Mendizábal
