= Ildefonso Arenas =

Spanish writer

- Born: 1947 (age 78–79); Madrid
- Occupation: writer

Ildefonso Arenas (born 1947 in Madrid) is a Spanish writer, best known for his historical novels. An IT professional by trade, Arenas achieved enormous success with his novel Álava en Waterloo, based on the exploits of Miguel Ricardo de Álava. He has published half a dozen novels, for which he typically does exhaustive historical research.
