= Mendigorría =

Settlement in Navarre, Spain

Coordinates: 42°38′N 1°50′W

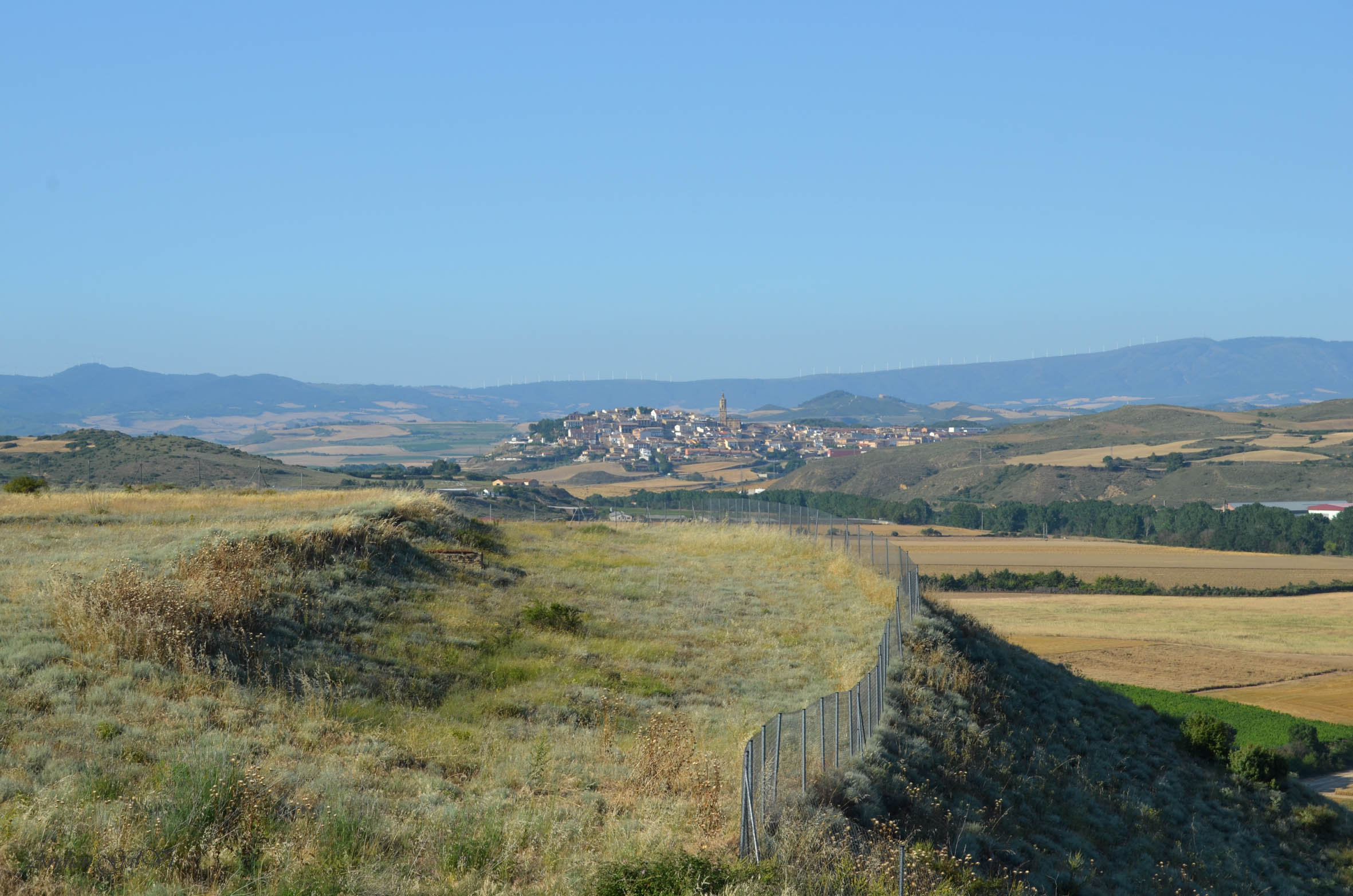
View of Mendigorria from the Roman ruins of Andelos

Mendigorría (Basque: Mendigorria) is a town and municipality located in the province and autonomous community of Navarre, northern Spain. The Battle of Mendigorría took place here in 1835.
