= 1834 Spanish general election =

← 1822	30 June 1834	1836 →

All 188 seats of the Congress of Deputies 94 seats needed for a majority
- Turnout: ≈58.9%
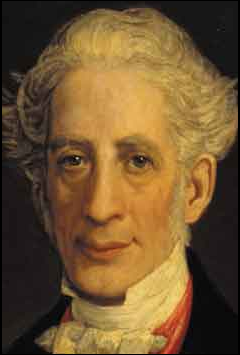

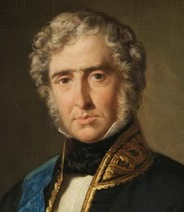
	First party	Second party
Leader	Francisco de Paula Martínez de la Rosa y Berdejo	Juan Álvarez Mendizábal
Party	Moderate	Progressive Party
Leader's seat	Madrid	Madrid
Seats won	111	77
Seat change	New	New
Prime Minister before election
Francisco Cea Bermúdez
Independent
Prime Minister after election
Francisco de Paula Martínez de la Rosa y Berdejo
Moderate Party

General elections to the Cortes Generales were held in Spain in 1834. At stake were all 188 seats in the Congress of Deputies.

== Background ==
The 1834 elections were the first ones since 1822 and signalled the return of liberalism to Spain after the absolutist Década Ominosa.

== Electoral system ==
The elections were held under the Spanish Royal Statute of 1834, not under a full constitutional system. A first-past-the-post system was used with 48 multi-member constituencies and one single-member constituency.

Only around 18,000 people were allowed to vote, out of a population of 12 million.

== Results ==
Party	Seats	+/–
Moderate Party	111	New
Progressive Party	77	New
Total	188	–15
