= Battle of Mendigorría =

Battle of the First Carlist War

Coordinates: 42°37′14″N 1°50′38″W

- Part of First Carlist War
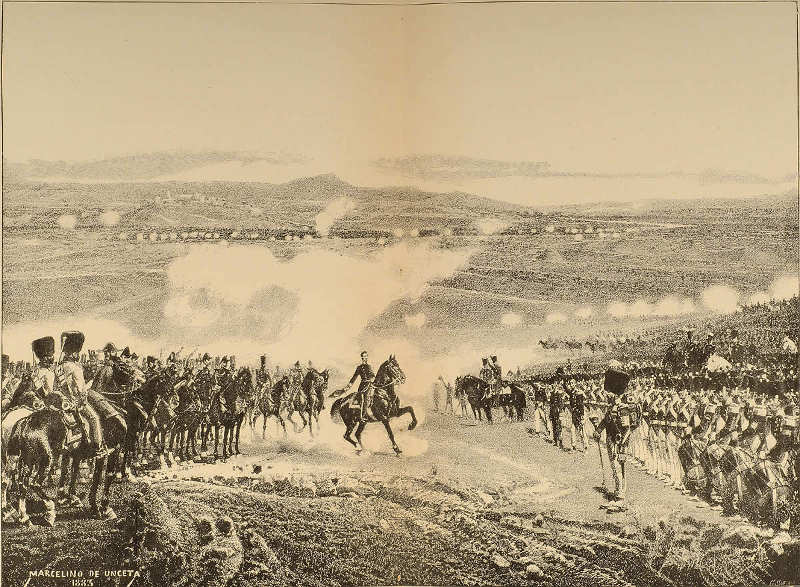
- Marcelino de Unceta, Battle of Mendigorría, 1886.
Date	16 July 1835
Location	Mendigorría, Navarre, Spain
Result	Liberal victory

Belligerents
Carlists supporting Infante Carlos of Spain	Liberals (Isabelinos or Cristinos) supporting Isabella II of Spain and her regent mother Maria Christina

Commanders and leaders
Vicente González Moreno; Bruno Villareal	Luis Fernández de Córdova; Baldomero Espartero; Diego de Leon

Strength
24,000	36,000

Casualties and losses
1,500	1,000

The Battle of Mendigorría took place during the First Carlist War on July 16, 1835 south of Mendigorría, Navarre. The Carlists were commanded by Vicente González Moreno, who assumed the post after the death of Tomás de Zumalacárregui at the Siege of Bilbao. The Carlist pretender, Don Carlos, was also at Mendigorría.

When the Liberals attacked, the Carlists found themselves in a difficult strategic position: they had the Arga River behind them and only one way across, the Larraga Bridge.

The Liberal left flank was led by Baldomero Espartero, the central flank by Luis Fernández de Córdova.

The Carlist fiercely defended themselves but were forced to retreat. Don Carlos escaped thanks to the efforts to defend the bridge by the Carlist brigadier Bruno Villarreal.

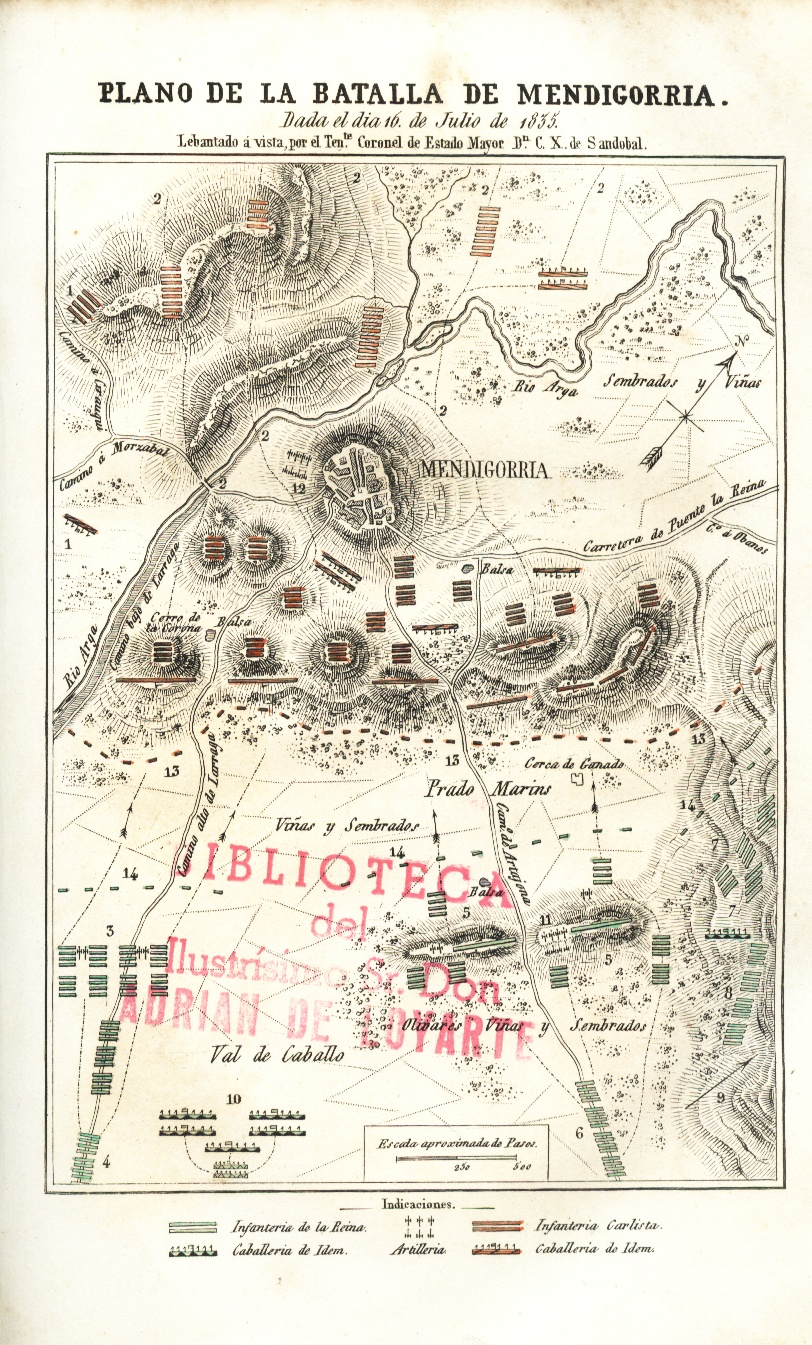
Plan of battle of Mendigorría

The battle was a victory for the Liberals, but they did not press forward and take advantage of the situation.
