= Trienio Liberal =

Spanish liberal government, 1820 to 1823

Kingdom of the Spains (Spain and the Indies) Reino de las Españas (España e Indias)
- 1820–1823
- Flag Coat of Arms
- Motto: Plus ultra (Latin) (English: "Further Beyond")
- Anthem: Himno de Riego; Anthem of Riego
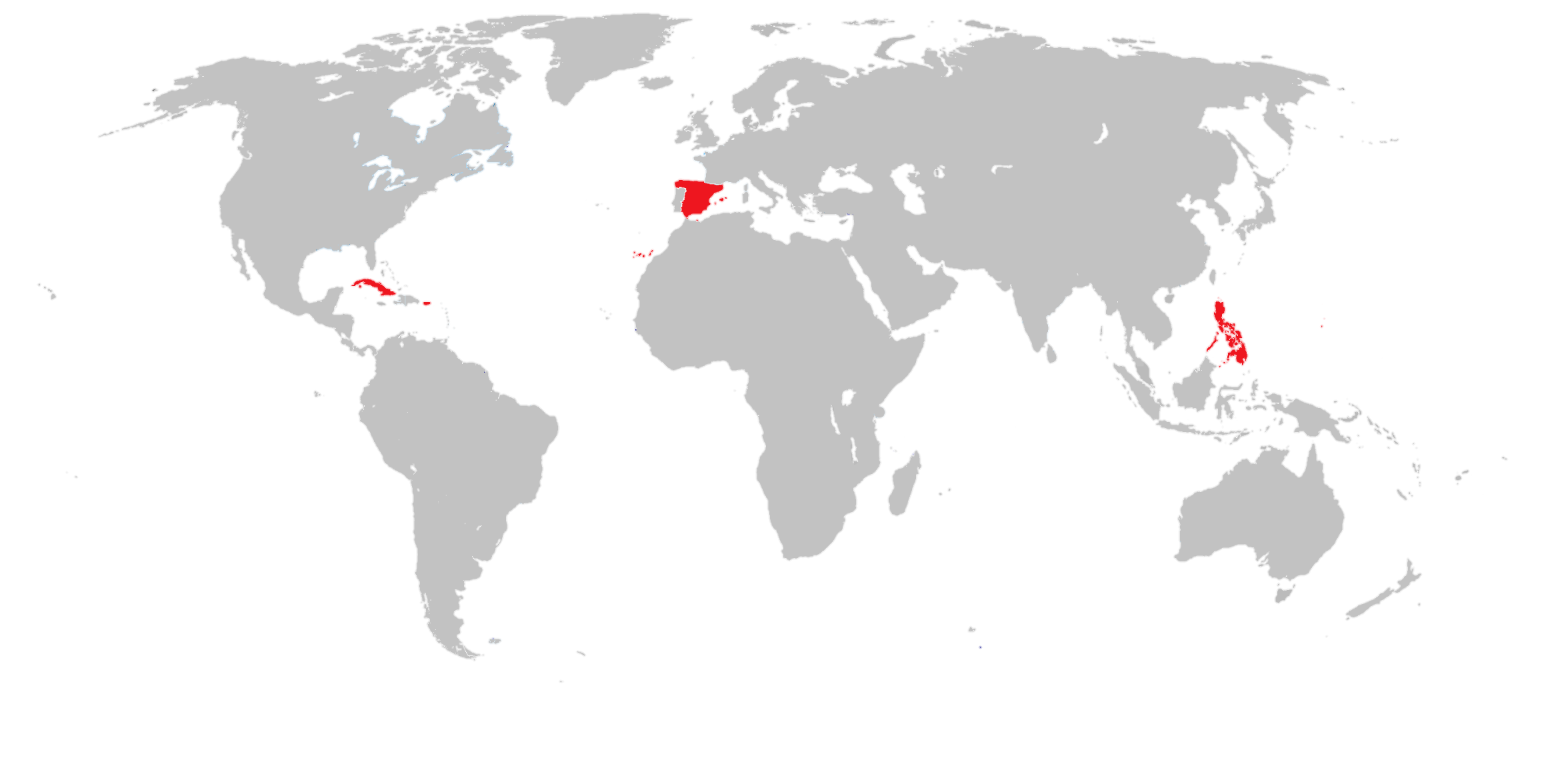
- Capital: Madrid
- Common languages: Spanish
- Religion: Roman Catholic Church (official)
- Demonym: Spanish
- Government: Unitary parliamentary constitutional monarchy
- King
  - 1820–1823: Ferdinand VII
- Secretary of State
  - 1820–1821: Evaristo Pérez
  - 1821–1822: Ramón López-Pelegrín
  - 1822: Francisco Martínez
  - 1822–1823: Evaristo Fernández
  - 1823: José María Pando
- Legislature: Cortes Generales
- Historical era: Revolutions during the 1820s
  - Established: 1 January 1820
  - Restoration of the Constitution: 7 March 1820
  - First general election: April – May 1820
  - Second general election: October – December 1822
  - Disestablished: 1 October 1823
- Currency: Spanish dollar
Preceded by	Succeeded by
Sexenio Absolutista	Ominous Decade

The Trienio Liberal, ([ˈtɾjenjo liβeˈɾal], lit. 'Liberal Triennium') or Three Liberal Years, was a period of three years in Spain between 1820 and 1823 when a liberal government ruled Spain after a military uprising in January 1820 by the lieutenant-colonel Rafael del Riego against the absolutist rule of Ferdinand VII.

It ended in 1823 when, with the approval of the crowned heads of Europe, a French army invaded Spain and reinstated the King's absolute power. This invasion is known in France as the "Spanish Expedition" (expédition d’Espagne) and in Spain as the "Hundred Thousand Sons of Saint Louis."

== Revolution of Cabezas de San Juan ==
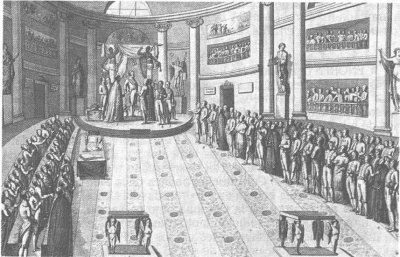
1820 print depicting the Cortes Generales.

King Ferdinand VII provoked widespread unrest, particularly in the army, by refusing to accept the liberal Spanish Constitution of 1812. The King sought to reclaim the Spanish colonies in the Americas that had recently revolted successfully, consequently depriving Spain of an essential source of revenue.

In January 1820, soldiers assembled at Cádiz for an expedition to South America, angry over infrequent pay, bad food, and poor quarters, mutinied under the leadership of Rafael del Riego. Pledging fealty to the 1812 Constitution, they seized their commander.

Subsequently, the rebel forces moved to nearby San Fernando, where they began preparations to march on the capital, Madrid.

== Liberal government ==
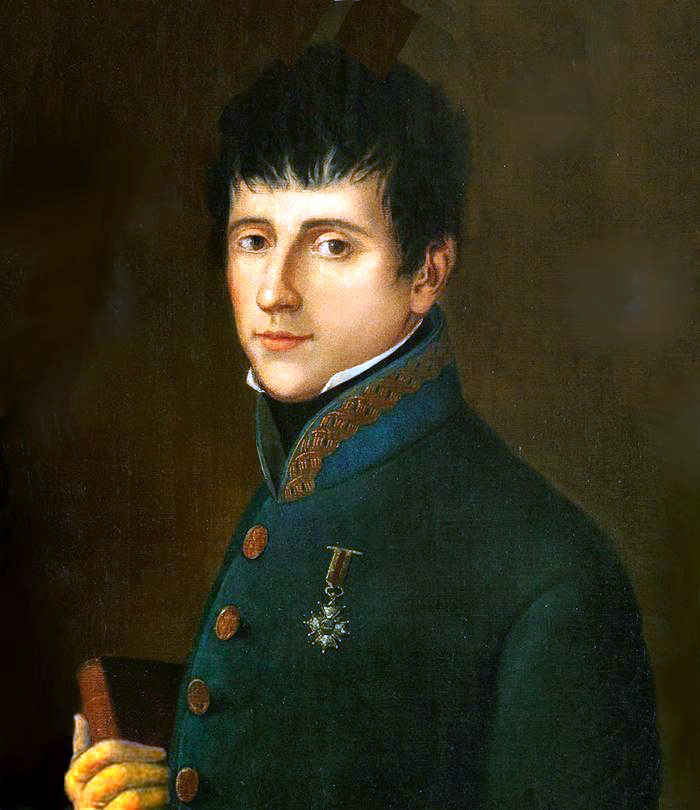
Rafael del Riego (1784–1823), the leader of the Cortes Generales, which sought to restore the 1812 constitution.

Despite the rebels' relative weakness, Ferdinand accepted the constitution on 9 March 1820, granting power to liberal ministers and ushering in the so-called Liberal Triennium (el Trienio Liberal), a period of liberal rule. However, political conspiracies of both right and left proliferated in Spain, as was the case across much of the rest of Europe. Liberal revolutionaries stormed the King's palace and seized Ferdinand VII, who was a prisoner of the Cortes in all but name for the next three years and retired to Aranjuez. The elections to the Cortes Generales in 1822 were won by Rafael del Riego. Ferdinand's supporters set themselves up at Urgell, took up arms and put in place an absolutist regency, the Urgel Regency.

Ferdinand's supporters, accompanied by the Royal Guard, staged an uprising in Madrid that was subdued by forces supporting the new government and its constitution. Despite the defeat of Ferdinand's supporters at Madrid, civil war erupted in the regions of Castile, Toledo, and Andalusia.

Three years of liberal rule (the Trienio Liberal) followed. The Progresista government reorganized Spain into 52 provinces, and it intended to reduce the regional autonomy that had been a hallmark of Spanish bureaucracy since Habsburg rule in the 16th and 17th centuries. Opposition of the affected regions, in particular, Aragon, Navarre, and Catalonia, shared in the king's antipathy for the liberal government. The anticlerical policies of the Progresista government led to friction with the Catholic Church, and attempts to bring about industrialisation alienated old trade guilds. The Spanish Inquisition, which had been abolished by both Joseph Bonaparte and the Cortes of Cádiz during the French occupation, was ended again by the government, which led to accusations of it being nothing more than afrancesados (francophiles), who, only six years earlier, had been forced out of the country.

More radical liberals attempted to revolt against the entire idea of a monarchy, regardless of how little power it had. In 1821, they were suppressed, but the incident served to illustrate the frail coalition that bound the government together.

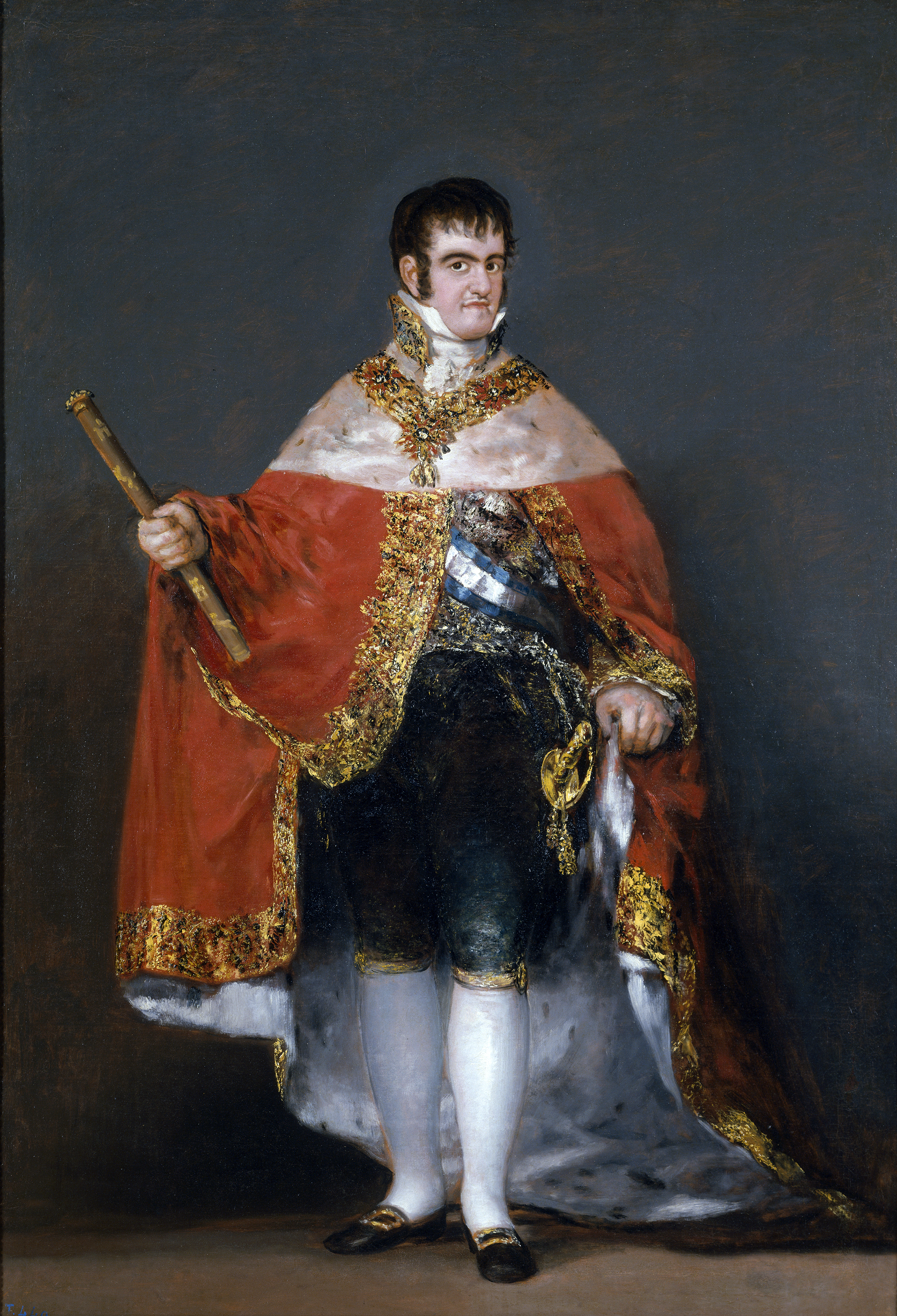
Ferdinand VII of Spain, who abolished the Spanish Constitution of 1812 in 1814. Portrait by Francisco Goya, 1814.

The election of a radical liberal government in 1823 further destabilized Spain. The army, whose liberal leanings had brought the government to power, began to waver when the Spanish economy failed to improve, and in 1823, a mutiny in Madrid had to be suppressed. The Jesuits, who had been banned by Charles III in the 18th century, only to be rehabilitated by Ferdinand VII after his restoration, were banned again by the government. For the duration of liberal rule, Ferdinand (still technically head of state) lived under virtual house arrest in Madrid. The Congress of Vienna, ending the Napoleonic Wars, had inaugurated the "Congress system" as an instrument of international stability in Europe. Rebuffed by the Holy Alliance of Russia, Austria, and Prussia in his request for help against the liberal revolutionaries in 1820, by 1822, the "Concert of Europe" was so concerned by Spain's liberal government and its surprising hardiness that it was prepared to intervene on Ferdinand's behalf.

In 1822, the Congress of Verona authorized France to intervene. Louis XVIII was only too happy to put an end to Spain's liberal experiment, and a massive army, the 100,000 Sons of Saint Louis, was dispatched across the Pyrenees in April 1823. The Spanish army, fraught by internal divisions, offered little resistance to the well organised French force, who seized Madrid and reinstalled Ferdinand as absolute monarch. The liberals' hopes for a new Spanish War of Independence were dashed.

== Consolidation of Spanish American independence ==
The army rebellion led by Rafael del Riego brought Spain into the so-called Liberal Triennium and led Spanish America to the consolidation of independence. The military uprising pursued a twofold objective: to restore the Constitution of 1812 and to prevent the Great Expedition from reaching the American continent. The coup was organized by secret societies or Masonic lodges and by Spanish American pro-independence agents, and was promoted chiefly by the liberals of Cádiz known as veinteañistas or "exaltados". The king, lacking military support, had to renounce his despotic absolutism and submit to the former constitution and the new liberal Cortes.

The Cortes of the Liberal Triennium passed two fundamental laws on military matters: the Constitutive Law of the Army (June 1821) and the Organic Law of the Navy (December of the same year). Both strengthened control over the armed forces in accordance with the principles of the Constitution of 1812. In application of these provisions, on 28 January 1822 the dissolution of the overseas infantry and cavalry depots established in Andalusia was ordered, as their existence was considered incompatible with the decrees enacted by the Cortes the previous year. The rebellion of the expedition, the dissolution of the troop depot for the overseas territories and the lack of new reinforcements at such a decisive moment ultimately guaranteed the independence of America. José de La Serna foresaw the fall of the Peruvian viceroyalty. In December 1820, Pablo Morillo, after having requested it on sixteen previous occasions, relinquished command of the expeditionary army of Costa Firme and returned to Spain.

They do not want to be Spaniards; they have said so loudly since they proclaimed independence, they have maintained it without ever contradicting their opinion in any circumstance or vicissitude of the Peninsula, they repeat it now without laying down their arms, and they will always repeat it, whatever our conduct and our Government may be: absolute independence or war is the only choice they leave us to make.

— Pablo Morillo to the Minister of War, Valencia, Venezuela, 26 July 1820.

Regarding America, the new government replaced repression with negotiation. Instead of sending troops, it appointed commissioners to bring pro-independence leaders back under royal authority in exchange for recognition by Spain. The government announced a ceasefire for negotiations with the insurgents, conditional on their acceptance of the Constitution of 1812, which Ferdinand VII had abolished in 1814 and which had been restored in 1820. Under the ceasefire, Spain would end the persecution and grant a general amnesty; otherwise, the war would continue. The patriots demanded recognition of their independence, and the eleven commissioners failed to reach an agreement.

The government nonetheless avoided a clear position on independence. It appointed commissioners without full negotiating powers and halted military support for the royalists in America, which caused demoralization and a loss of allegiance among those who remained loyal to the monarchy. During this period, the army assembled to recover the Río de la Plata rebelled, the viceroyalties of New Spain and New Granada collapsed, and Peru was invaded, leaving the last royalist strongholds isolated.

== French intervention ==
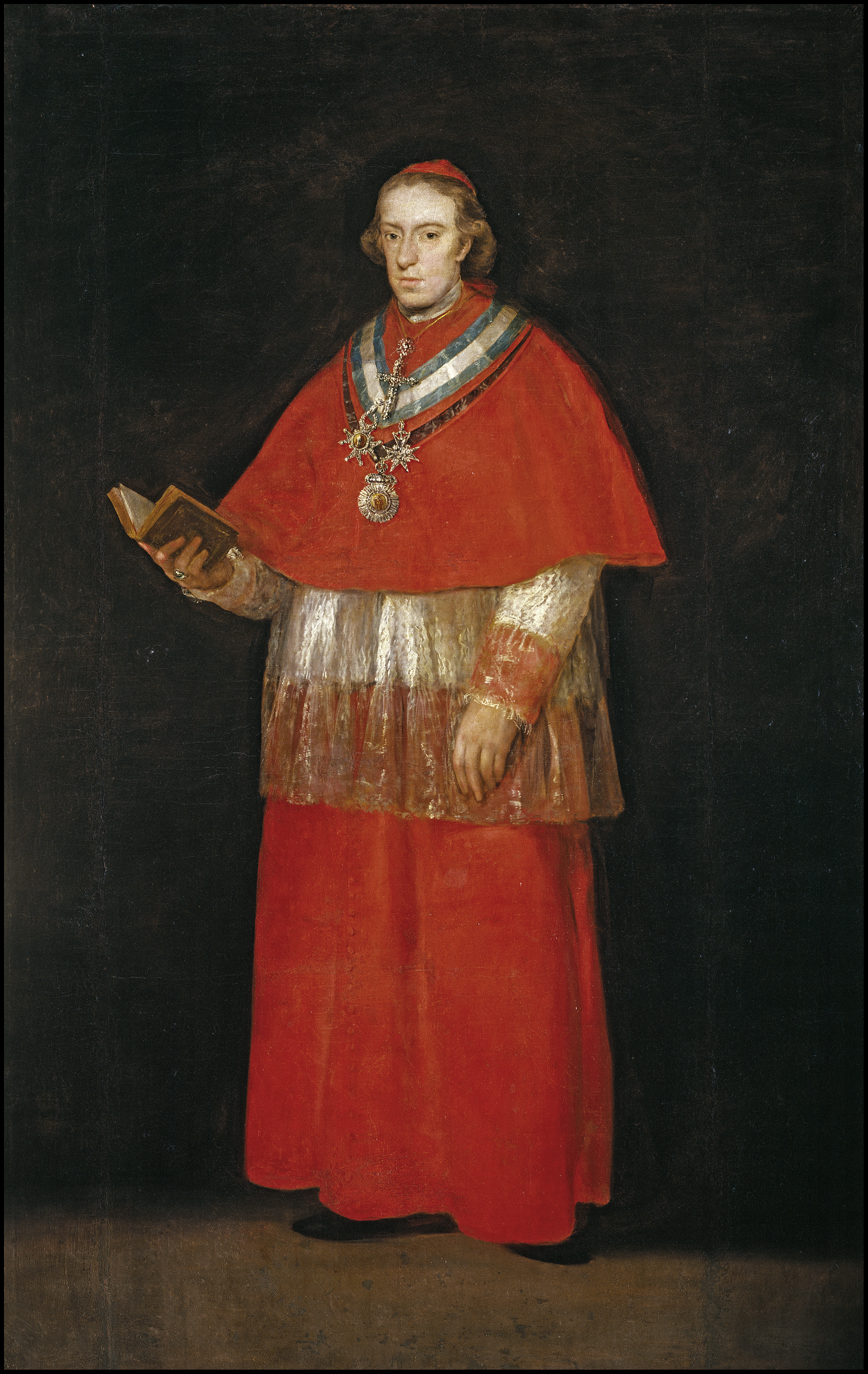
Luis María de Borbón y Vallabriga, 14th Count of Chinchón (1777–1823), Archbishop of Toledo and Primate of Spain, a liberal churchman who abolished the Spanish Inquisition in 1820. (It would be re-established in 1823.)

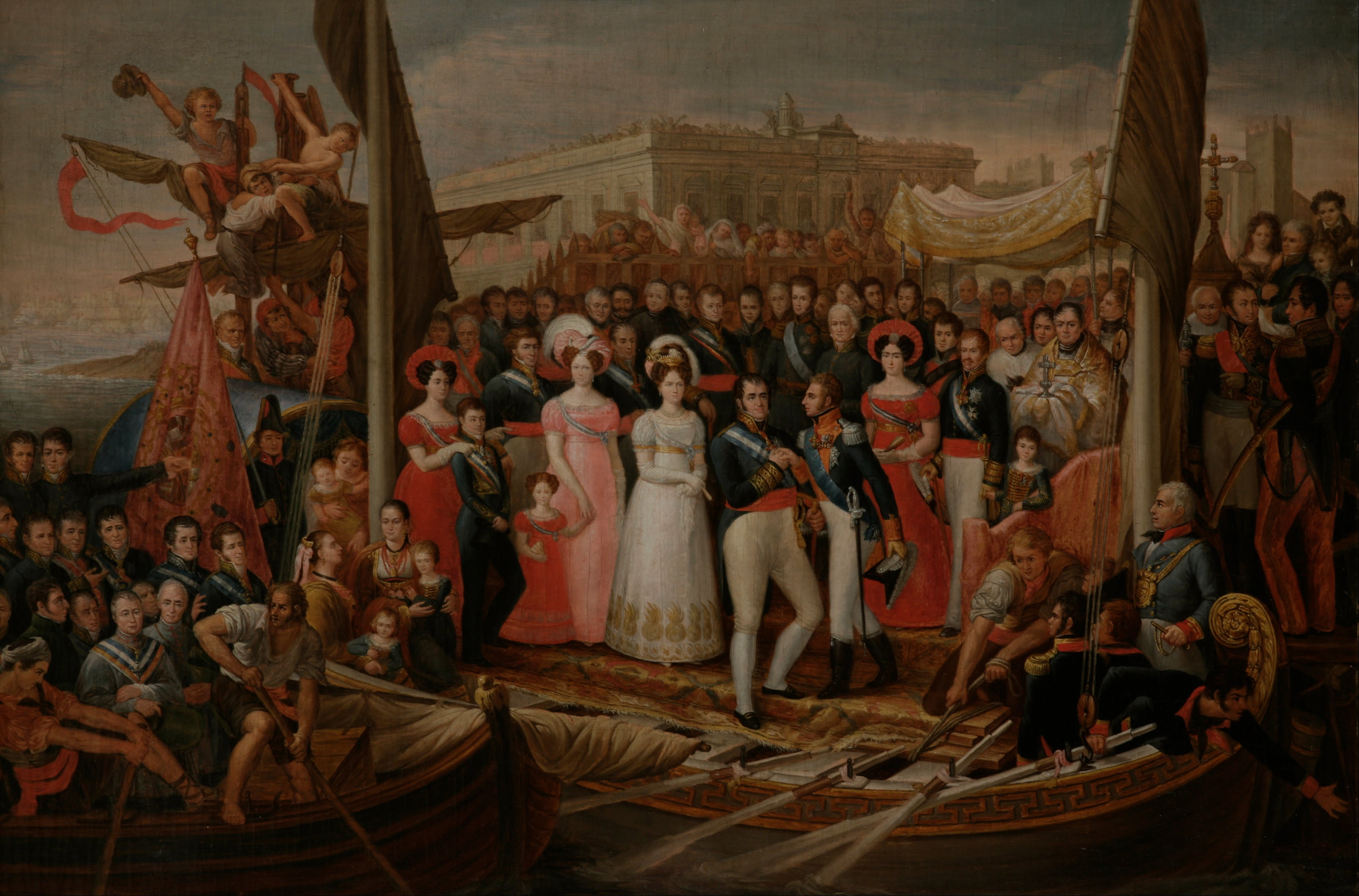
The Landing of Ferdinand VII in El Puerto de Santa María by José Aparicio. Ferdinand VII greets the Duke of Angoulême having been freed from the control of the Liberal government in Cádiz.

In 1822, Ferdinand VII applied the terms of the Congress of Vienna, lobbied for the assistance of the other absolute monarchs of Europe, in the process joining the Holy Alliance formed by Russia, Prussia, Austria and France to restore absolutism. In France, the ultra-royalists pressured Louis XVIII to intervene. To temper their counter-revolutionary ardour, the Duke of Richelieu deployed troops along the Pyrenees Mountains along the France-Spain border, charging them with halting the spread of Spanish liberalism and the "yellow fever" from encroaching into France. In September 1822, the cordon sanitaire became an observation corps and then very quickly transformed itself into a military expedition.

The Holy Alliance (Russia, Austria and Prussia) refused Ferdinand's request for help, but the Quintuple Alliance (United Kingdom, France, Russia, Prussia and Austria), at the Congress of Verona in October 1822, gave France a mandate to intervene and restore the Spanish monarchy. On 22 January 1823, a secret treaty was signed at the congress of Verona, allowing France to invade Spain to restore Ferdinand VII as an absolute monarch. With that agreement from the Holy Alliance, on 28 January 1823, Louis XVIII announced that "a hundred thousand Frenchmen are ready to march, invoking the name of Saint Louis, to safeguard the throne of Spain for a grandson of Henry IV of France".

== See also ==
- Bienio progresista – Period of Spanish history under the Progressive Party (1854–1856)
- Sexenio Democrático – 1868–1874 period of Spain under a provisional government

== Bibliography ==
=== In French ===
- Encyclopédie Universalis, Paris, Volume 18, 2000
- Larousse, tome 1, 2, 3, Paris, 1998
- Caron, Jean-Claude, La France de 1815 à 1848, Paris, Armand Colin, coll. « Cursus », 2004, 193 p.
- Corvisier, André, Histoire militaire de la France, de 1715 à 1871, tome 2, Paris, Presses universitaires de France, "Quadrige" collection, 1998, 627 p.
- Demier, Francis, La France du XIXe 1814–1914, Seuil, 2000, 606 p.
- Dulphy, Anne, Histoire de l'Espagne de 1814 à nos jours, le défi de la modernisation, Paris, Armand Colin, "128" collection, 2005, 127 p.
- Duroselle, Jean-Baptiste, L'Europe de 1815 à nos jours : vie politique et relation internationale, Paris, Presses Universitaires de France, "Nouvelle clio" collection, 1967, 363 p.
- Garrigues, Jean, Lacombrade, Philippe, La France au 19e siècle, 1814–1914, Paris, Armand Colin, "Campus" collection, 2004, 191 p.
- Lever, Evelyne, Louis XVIII, Paris, Fayard, 1998, 597 p.
- Jean Sarrailh, Un homme d'état espagnol: Martínez de la Rosa (1787–1862) (Paris, 1930)

=== In Spanish ===
- Miguel Artola Gallego, La España de Fernando VII (Madrid, 1968)
- Jonathan Harris, 'Los escritos de codificación de Jeremy Bentham y su recepción en el primer liberalismo español', Télos. Revista Iberoamericana de Estudios Utilitaristas 8 (1999), 9–29
- W. Ramírez de Villa-Urrutia, Fernando VII, rey constitucional. Historia diplomática de España de 1820 a 1823 (Madrid, 1922)

=== In English ===
- Raymond Carr, Spain 1808–1975 (Oxford, 1982, 2nd ed.)
- Charles W. Fehrenbach, ‘Moderados and Exaltados: the liberal opposition to Ferdinand VII, 1814–1823’, Hispanic American Historical Review 50 (1970), 52–69
- Jonathan Harris, 'An English utilitarian looks at Spanish American independence: Jeremy Bentham's Rid Yourselves of Ultramaria', The Americas 53 (1996), 217–33
- Jarrett, Mark (2013). The Congress of Vienna and its Legacy: War and Great Power Diplomacy after Napoleon. London: I. B. Tauris & Company, Ltd. ISBN 978-1780761169.
