= José María Queipo de Llano, 7th Count of Toreno =

Spanish politician and historian (1786–1843)

The Most Excellent The Count of Toreno GE
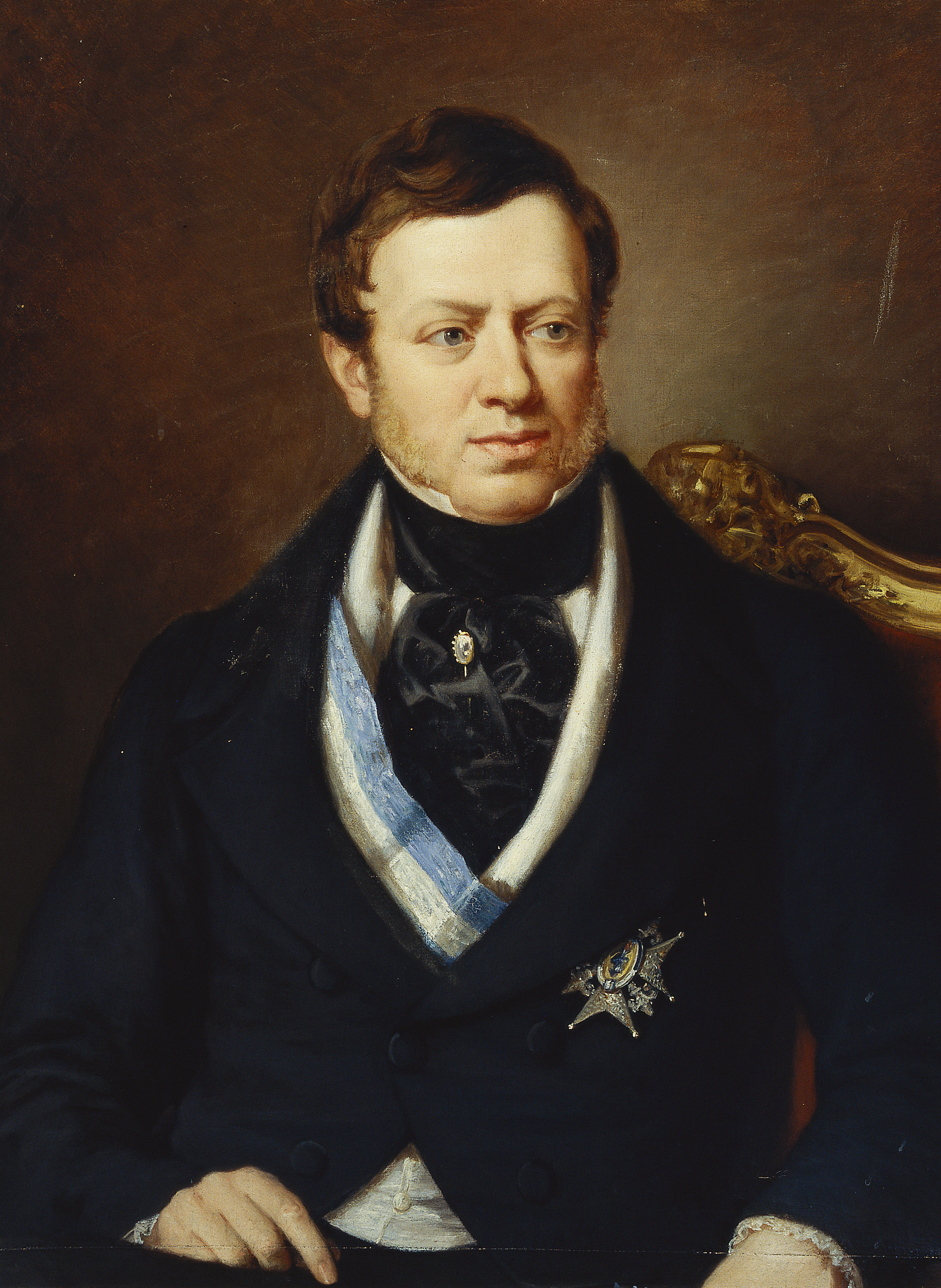

Prime Minister of Spain
- In office 7 June 1835 – 14 September 1835
- Monarch: Isabella II
- Preceded by: Francisco de Paula Martínez de la Rosa
- Succeeded by: Juan Álvarez Mendizábal

Minister of State
- In office 7 June – 14 September 1835
- Prime Minister: (Himself)
- Preceded by: Francisco de Paula Martínez de la Rosa
- Succeeded by: Miguel Ricardo de Álava y Esquivel

Minister of the Treasury
- In office 18 June 1834 – 13 June 1835
- Prime Minister: Francisco de Paula Martínez de la Rosa
- Preceding: José Imaz Baquedano
- Succeeded by: Juan Álvarez Mendizábal

Personal details
- Born: 25 November 1786 Oviedo, Spain
- Died: 16 September 1843 (aged 56) Paris, France
- Party: Realista Moderado

José María Queipo de Llano y Ruiz de Saravia, 7th Count of Toreno, GE (25 November 1786 – 16 September 1843), was a Spanish politician and historian, who was Prime Minister of Spain. In Spain, he is simply known as Conde de Toreno.

== Life ==
Toreno was born at Oviedo on 25 November 1786. His family was wealthy and belonged to the most ancient nobility of Asturias. His mother, Dorninga Ruiz de Saravia, owned property in the province of Cuenca. The son received a better education in classics, mathematics and modern languages than was usual at that time. The young viscount of Matarrosa, the title he bore in his fathers' lifetime, was introduced to the writings of Voltaire and Rousseau by the abbot of the Benedictine house of Montserrat in Madrid. He was present at Madrid when the city rose against the French occupation led by Marshal Murat on 2 May 1808, and took part in the struggle which was the beginning of the Peninsular War.

From Madrid, he escaped to Asturias, and on May 30 he embarked in a Jersey privateer at Gijón, with other delegates, in order to ask for the help of England against the French. The deputation was enthusiastically received in London. By December 30 he was back in Asturias, his father having died in the interval. During the Peninsular War, he saw some service in the first occupation of Asturias by the French, but he was mainly occupied by his duties as a member of the Cortes. In 1809, he was at Seville, where one of his uncles was a member of the central Junta. In the following year he was a leader of the party which compelled the Regency to summon the Cortes to which he was elected by Asturias early in 1811 though he was short several months of the legal age of twenty-five. His election was opposed by some of his own relatives who did not share his opinions, but it was ratified by the Cortes.

Toreno was conspicuous among the well-meaning men who framed the liberal and republican constitution of 1812. When the authoritarian King Ferdinand VII returned from prison in France in 1814 Toreno foresaw a reaction, and put himself out of reach of the king. He was the more an object of suspicion because his brother-in-law, Juan Díaz Porlier, perished in a wild attempt to support the constitution by force. Toreno remained in exile until the outbreak of the revolution of 1820. Between that year and 1823 he was in Spain serving in the restored Cortes, and experience had abated his radical ardour. When the French intervened in 1823 Toreno had again to go into exile, and remained abroad until the king published the amnesty of 15 October 1832.

He returned home in July 1833, but remained on his estates until the king's death on September 29. As hereditary standard-bearer of Asturias (Alferez Mayor) it fell to him to proclaim the young queen, Isabella II. In 1834 his now moderate opinions pointed him out to the queen regent, Maria Christina, as a useful man for office. In June 1834 he was minister of finance, and became the 2nd Prime Minister of Spain on June 7. His tenure of the premiership lasted only until September 14 of the same year, when the regent's attempt to retain a practically despotic government under a thin constitutional veil broke down. The greater part of the remainder of his life was spent in voluntary exile, and he died in Paris on 16 September 1843. Toreno is chiefly remembered as the author of the History of the Rising, War and Revolution of Spain, which he began between 1823 and 1832 and published in 1836–1838 in Paris. It was one of the earliest and more comprehensive studies of the Peninsular War written by a Spaniard who held a prominent role in those events.

== Personal life ==
Toreno was a Freemason and attended the Masonic Lodge “La Templanza” in Madrid. His name appears in the third list of Freemasons compiled in the Reserved Papers of Ferdinand VII made in September 1821.

== Notes ==
Political offices
| Preceded by Francisco de Paula Martínez de la Rosa | Prime Minister of Spain; 7 June 1835–14 September 1835 | Succeeded by Miguel Ricardo de Álava |
| Preceded by Francisco de Paula Martínez de la Rosa | Minister of State; 7 June 1835–14 September 1835 | Succeeded by Miguel Ricardo de Álava |
Spanish nobility
| Preceded by José Queipo de Llano | Count of Toreno | Succeeded by Francisco Queipo de Llano |
