= 1813 Spanish general election =

- May - September 1813

All 149 seats of the Congress of Deputies 75 seats needed for a majority
- Turnout: NA
	First party	Second party
Party	Liberals	Absolutist "Persians"
Seats won	80	69

General elections to the Cortes Generales were held in Spain in 1813. At stake were all 149 seats in the Congress of Deputies.

== History ==
The 1813 elections were the first ones held since the approval of the 1812 Cádiz Constitution. Vote was secret for the first time. All males over 21 years old, a total of 3,216,460 people, had the right to vote.

== Results ==
Party	Seats
Liberals	80
Absolutists (also called "persas")	69
Total	149
