= Francisco Martínez de la Rosa =

Prime Minister of Spain (1787–1862)

The Most Excellent Francisco Martínez de la Rosa
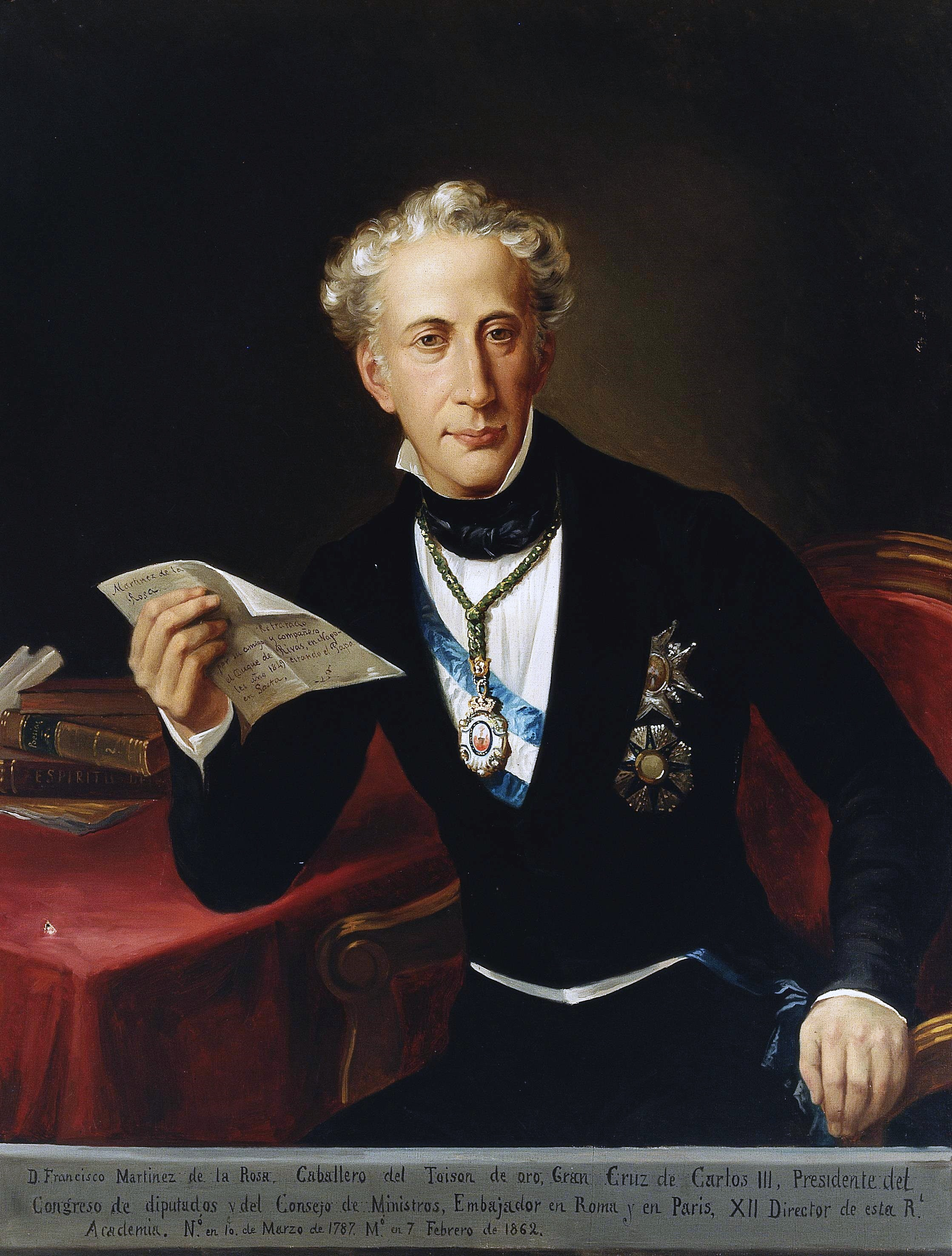

Prime Minister of Spain
- In office 10 January 1834 – 7 June 1835
- Monarch: Isabella II
- Preceded by: Francisco Cea Bermúdez
- Succeeded by: José María Queipo de Llano
- In office 28 February 1822 – 5 August 1822
- Monarch: Ferdinand VII
- Preceded by: Ramón López Pelegrín (acting)
- Succeeded by: Evaristo Fernández San Miguel y Valledor (acting)

Seat C of the Real Academia Española
- In office 4 January 1821 – 7 February 1862
- Preceded by: Manuel de Lardizábal y Uribe
- Succeeded by: Luis González Bravo

Director of the Real Academia Española
- In office 21 November 1839 – 7 February 1862
- Preceded by: José Gabriel de Silva-Bazán
- Succeeded by: Ángel de Saavedra

Personal details
- Born: Francisco de Paula Martínez de la Rosa y Cornejo; 10 March 1787 Granada, Spain
- Died: 7 February 1862 (aged 74) Madrid, Spain
- Resting place: Pantheon of Illustrious Men
- Party: Realista Moderado
- Education: University of Granada

Francisco de Paula Martínez de la Rosa y Cornejo (10 March 1787 – 7 February 1862) was a Spanish statesman and dramatist and the first prime minister of Spain to receive the title of President of the Council of Ministers.

He became Prime Minister in the opening months of the First Carlist War and his liberal government oversaw the promulgation of a new Spanish constitution: the Spanish Royal Statute of 1834.

== Biography ==
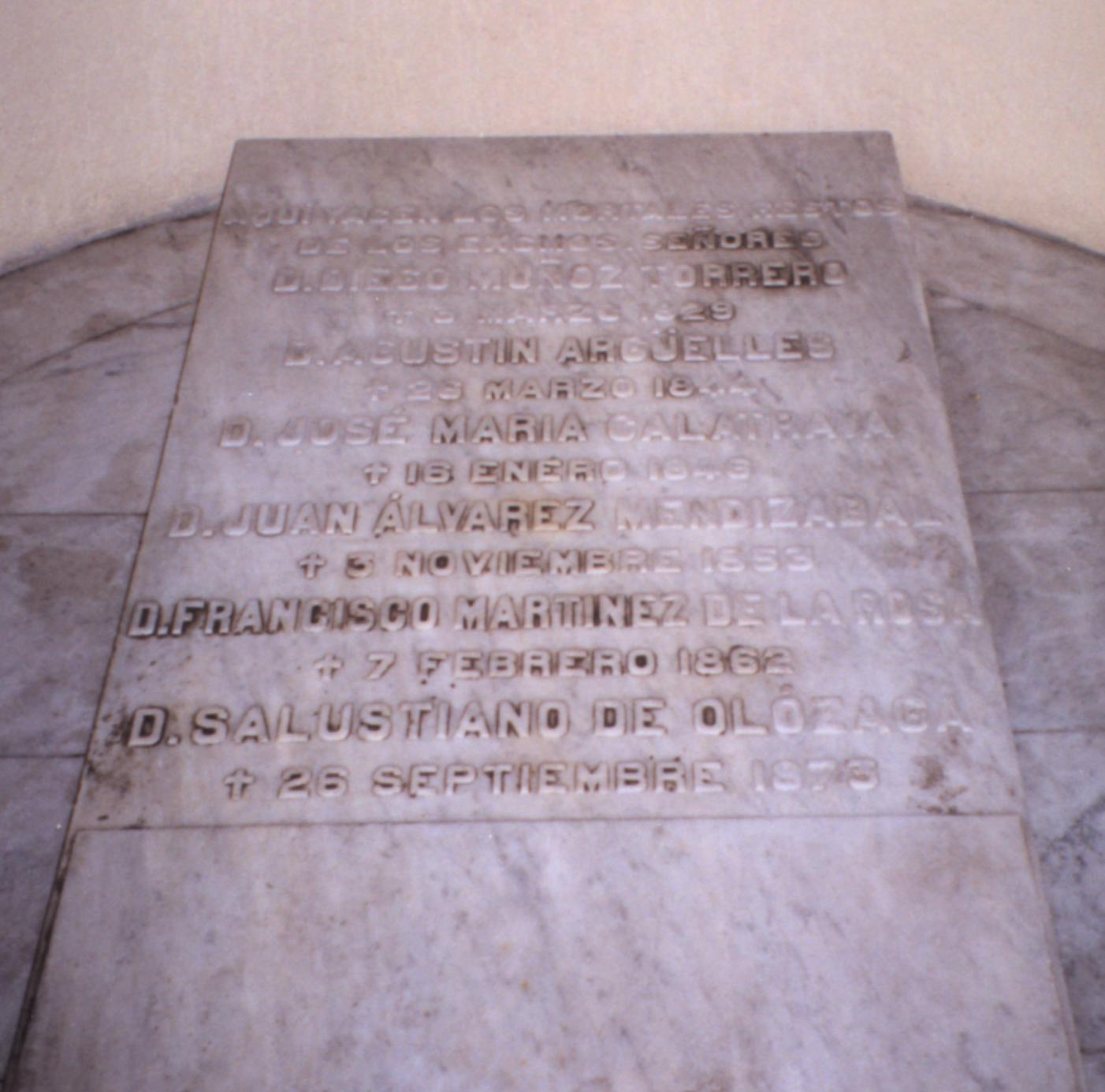
Tombstone of Martínez de la Rosa and other five Spanish Liberal politicians of the 19th century at the Panteón de Hombres Ilustres, Atocha, Madrid, Spain

He was born at Granada, and educated at the university there.

He won popularity with a series of epigrams on local celebrities published under the title of El Cementerio de momo. During the struggle against Napoleon he took the patriotic side, was elected deputy, and at Cádiz produced his first play, Lo que puede un empleo, a prose comedy in the manner of the younger Leandro Fernández de Moratín. La Viuda de Padilia (1814), a tragedy modelled upon Alfieri, was less acceptable to the Spanish public.

Meanwhile, the author became more and more engulfed in politics, and in 1814 was banished to Peñón de Vélez de la Gomera on the Barbary Coast, where he remained until 1820, when he was suddenly recalled and appointed prime minister. During the next three years he was the most unpopular man in Spain; denounced as a revolutionist by the Conservatives and as a reactionary by the Liberals, he alienated the sympathies of all parties, and his rhetoric earned for him the contemptuous nickname of Rosita la Pastelera (Rosie the compromiser/cake maker). In 1822, Francisco Martínez de la Rosa appointed Diego de Medrano y Treviño as Minister of the Interior, replacing Moscoso in the position.

Exiled in 1823, he took refuge in Paris, where he issued his Obras literarias (1827), including his Arte poética, in which he exaggerated the literary theories already promulgated by Luzán.

Returning to Spain in 1831, he became prime minister on the death of Ferdinand VII, but proved incapable of coping with the insurrectionary movement and resigned in 1834. Before retiring, Martinez de la Rosa, as President of the Cabinet, approved the royal decree that finally abolished the Spanish Inquisition. Martínez de la Rosa was active within Freemasonry, having features in the second list of Masons in the Reserved Papers of Ferdinand VII.

He was ambassador at Paris in 1839–1840 and at Rome in 1842–1843, joined the Conservative party, held many important offices, and was president of congress and director of the Royal Spanish Academy at the time of his death, which took place at Madrid on 7 February 1862.

As a statesman, Martinez de la Rosa never rose above mediocrity. It was his misfortune to be in place without real power, to struggle against a turbulent pseudo-democratic movement promoted by unscrupulous soldiers, and to contend with the intrigues of the king, the court camarilla and the clergy. But circumstances which hampered him in politics favoured his career in literature. He was not a great natural force; his early plays and poems are influenced by Leandro Moratín or by Juan Meléndez Valdés; his Espíritu del siglo (1835) is a summary of all the commonplaces concerning the philosophy of history; his Doña Isabel de Solís (1837–1846) is an imitation of Walter Scott's historical novels.

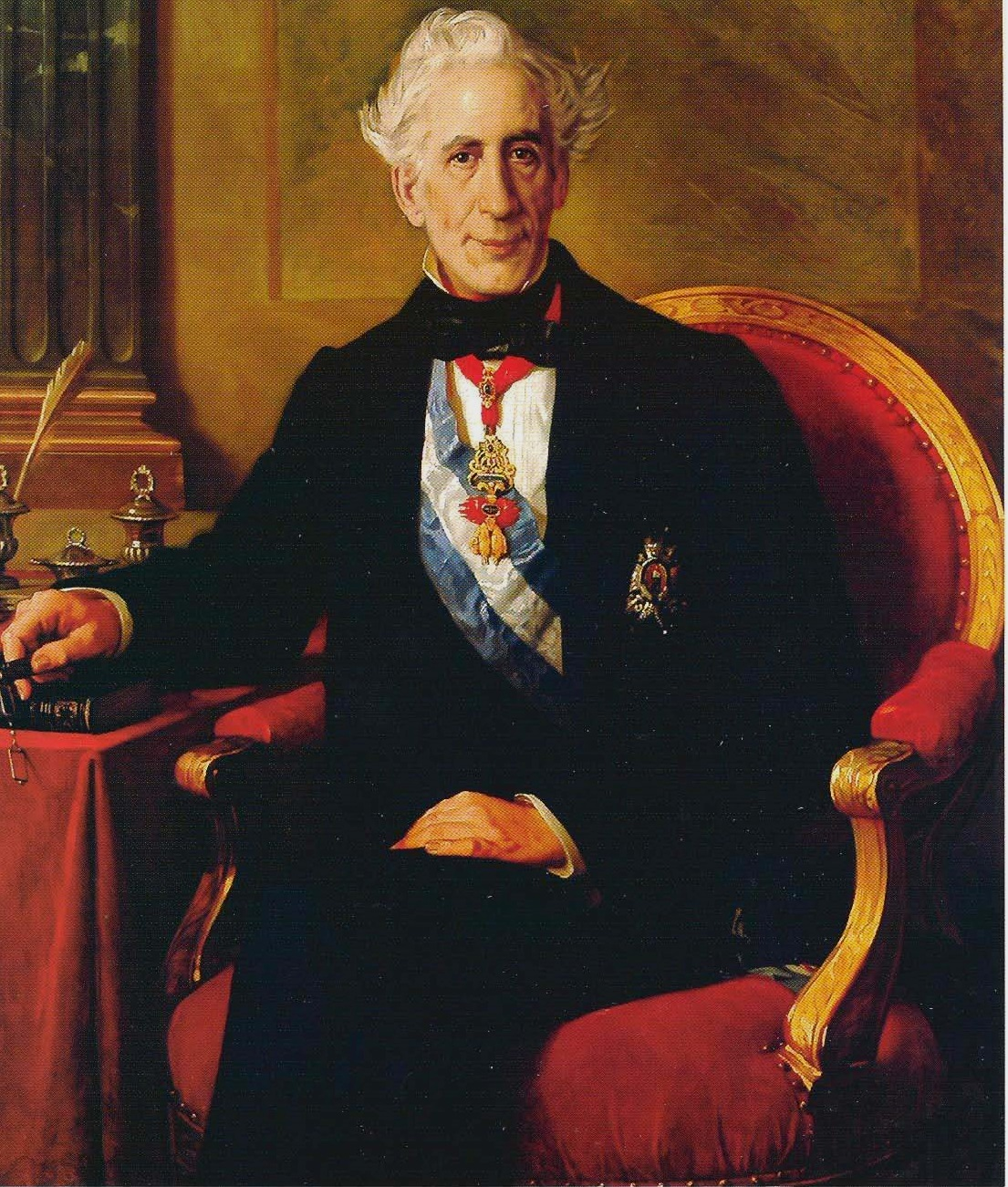
Francisco de Paula Martínez de la Rosa

Through the accident of his exile at Paris he was thrown into relations with the leaders of the French Romantic Movement, and was so far impressed with the innovations of the new school as to write in French a romantic piece entitled Abén Humeya (1830), which was played at the Porte Saint-Martin. On his return to Madrid Martinez de la Rosa produced La Conjuracíon de Venecia (23 April 1834), which entitles him to be called the pioneer of the romantic drama in Spain.

== Orders ==
=== Kingdom of Spain ===
- Knight of the Order of the Golden Fleece.
- Knight Grand Cross of the Order of Charles III.

=== Foreign ===
- Knight of the Supreme Order of Christ. (Kingdom of Portugal)
- Knight Grand Cross of the Order of the Legion of Honor. (Kingdom of France)
- Knight Grand Cross of the Order of the Redeemer. (Kingdom of Greece)
- Knight Grand Cross of the Order of the Southern Cross. (Empire of Brazil)
- Knight Grand Cross of the Order of the Lion of the Netherlands. (Kingdom of the Netherlands)
- Knight Grand Cross of the Order of Pius IX. (Papal States)
- Knight of the Order of St. Jenaro. (Kingdom of the Two Sicilies)
- Knight of the Order of St. Ferdinand of Merit. (Kingdom of the Two Sicilies)
- Knight Grand Cross of the Order of Saints Mauritius and Lazarus. (Kingdom of Sardinia)
- Knight of the Order of the Glory. (Ottoman Empire)

== Bibliography ==
Political offices
First None recognized before	Prime Minister of Spain; 15 January 1834 – 7 June 1835	Succeeded by The Count of Toreno
First None recognized before	Minister of State; 15 January 1834 – 7 June 1835	Succeeded by The Count of Toreno
Preceded by Ramón María Narváez; Acting	Minister of State; 21 August 1844 – 12 February 1846	Succeeded by The Marquis of Miraflores
Preceded by Leopoldo Augusto de Cueto	Minister of State; 25 October 1857 – 14 January 1858	Succeeded by Francisco Javier de Istúriz
