= Panero =

Panero is a surname. Notable people with the surname include:

- Hugh Panero, American broadcasting industry executive
- James Panero (born 1975), American cultural critic and the executive editor of The New Criterion
- José L. Panero (born 1959), Mexican-American botanist
- Juan Panero (1908–1937), Spanish poet, brother of Leopoldo
- Juan Luis Panero (1942–2013), Spanish poet, son of Leopoldo and brother of Leopoldo María
- Leopoldo Panero (1909–1962), Spanish poet, brother of Juan
- Leopoldo María Panero (1948–2014), Spanish poet, son of Leopoldo and brother of Juan Luis

== See also ==
- Panera (disambiguation)
- Panerai (surname)
