= 1935 in poetry =

Links to nations or nationalities point to articles with information on that nation's poetry or literature. For example, "United Kingdom" links to English poetry and "India" links to Indian poetry.

== Events ==
- June 3 – Canadian poet Charles G. D. Roberts is knighted.
- June 15
  - Gay English poet W. H. Auden enters a marriage of convenience with Erika Mann.
  - Premiere of T. S. Eliot's verse drama Murder in the Cathedral at Canterbury Cathedral in England.
- American poet George Oppen joins the Communist Party, where his organizing work will increasingly take precedence over his poetry; he writes no more verse until 1958.
- Picasso's poetry begins to be written.
- Tomb of Hafez in Shiraz, Persia, is rebuilt.

== Works published in English ==
=== Canada ===
- Arthur Bourinot, Selected Poems (1915–1935).
- E. J. Pratt, The Titanic, Toronto: Macmillan.
- Kenneth Leslie, Lowlands Low: Poems. Halifax: McCurdy
- Wilson MacDonald, The Song Of The Undertow and Other Poems. Toronto, Buffalo: S.J.R. Saunders, Broadway.
- Wilson MacDonald, Quintrains Of "Callender" and Other Poems. Toronto: S.J.R. Saunders.
- Tom MacInnes, Rhymes of a Rounder, Canada
- Duncan Campbell Scott, The Green Cloister, Canada
- Francis Sherman, The Complete Poems of Francis Sherman. Lorne Pierce ed. Toronto: Ryerson.

=== India, in English ===
- Sundhindra Dutt, Orchestra ( Poetry in English ),
- Govind Krishna Chettur, The Shadow of God: A Sonnet Sequence ( Poetry in English ), London: Longmans, published in the United Kingdom
- Nizamat Jung, Islamic Poems ( Poetry in English ), Hyderabad: Government Central Press

=== United Kingdom ===
- George Barker, Poems
- Samuel Beckett, Echo's Bones and Other Precipitates
- Norman Cameron, The Winter House
- Cecil Day-Lewis:
  - Collected Poems 1929–1933
  - A Time to Dance, and Other Poems
- Walter de la Mare, Poems 1919 to 1934
- T. S. Eliot, Murder in the Cathedral
- Christopher Hassall, Poems of Two Years
- Eiluned Lewis, December Apples (Welsh poet published in the United Kingdom)
- Louis MacNeice, Poems
- Herbert Read, Poems 1914–34
- James Reeves, The Natural Need (with preface, in verse, by Laura Riding)
- Siegfried Sassoon, Vigils
- Humbert Wolfe:
  - The Fourth of August, sonnets
  - Stings and Wings
  - X at Oberammergau
- W. B. Yeats, A Full Moon in March, Irish poet published in the United Kingdom

=== United States ===
- John Peale Bishop, Minute Particulars
- Robert P. Tristram Coffin, Strange Holiness
- Countee Cullen, The Medea and Some Poems
- E. E. Cummings, No Thanks
- Kenneth Fearing, Poems
- John Gould Fletcher, XXIV Elegies
- Hamlin Garland, Iowa, O Iowa
- Horace Gregory, Chorus for Survival
- Robinson Jeffers, Solstice and Other Poems
- James Weldon Johnson, Selected Poems
- Edgar Lee Masters, Invisible Landscapes
- Marianne Moore, Selected Poems
- John G. Neihardt, The Song of the Messiah
- Edwin Arlington Robinson, King Jasper
- Muriel Rukeyser, Theory of Flight
- Karl Shapiro, Poems
- Wallace Stevens, Ideas of Order, includes "Farewell to Florida", "The Idea of Order at Key West", "Academic Discourse at Havana", "Like Decorations in a Nigger Cemetery", and "A Postcard from the Volcano"), Alcestis Press (enlarged edition, 1936)
- Robert Penn Warren, Thirty-Six Poems
- William Carlos Williams, An Early Martyr and Other Poems

=== Other in English ===
- Allen Curnow (New Zealand):
  - Three Poems (Caxton)
  - Poetry and Language, a brief poetry manifesto (Caxton)
- C. J. Dennis, The Singing Garden, Australia
- W. B. Yeats, A Full Moon in March, Irish poet published in the United Kingdom
- Rex Ingamells, Gumtops, Australia

== Works published in other languages ==
=== France ===
- René Char, Le Marteau sans maitre
- René Daumal, Le Contre-ciel
- Paul Éluard, Facile
- Francis Jammes:
  - Alouette
  - De tout temps à jamais, Paris: Gallimard
- Henri Michaux, La Nuit remue
- Catherine Pozzi (died 1934), "Ave", "Vale", "Scopolamine", "Nova", "Maya" and "Nyx", published in Mesures

=== Indian subcontinent ===
Including all of the British colonies which later became India, Pakistan, Bangladesh, Sri Lanka and Nepal. Listed alphabetically by first name, regardless of surname:

==== Gujarati ====
- Balawantrai Thakore, Mharon Sonnet
- Jhaverchand Meghani, Yugavandana
- Jhinabhai Desai Snehrashmi, Arghya, the author's first poetry collection; many of the poems display patriotism and love for the poor
- Kavi Nhanalal, Ketalank Kavyo, Part 3 (Part 1 published 1903; Part 2 in 1908); the first part made Nhanalal's reputation as the best Gujarati lyric poet; the collection is known for its metrical innovations, creative power and mix of modern and old folk elements
- Kishorlal Mashruvala, translator, Vidayuelae — Kahlil Gibran's The Prophet from English into Gujarati
- Mansukhlal Jhaveri, Phooldal

==== Urdu ====
- Akbar Allahabadi, Kulliyat-i Akbar Allahabadi, in four volumes, published (fourteen years after his death in 1921) from this year through 1939; Indian, Urdu-language
- M. Diyauddin, translator, Kālam-i-Tagore, translated from the Bengali of Rabindranath Tagore, with Tagore involved in the translation, into Urdu
- Muhammad Iqbal, Bal-i Jibrial, alternate spelling: "Bal-i Jibril" ("Wings of Gabriel"), includes rubaiyat qitas and ghazals; famous poems in the volume: "Iblees Ki Majlis-e-Shura" ("The Parliament of Satan"), "Jibrail-o-Iblis", "Lenin Khuda Ke Hazur main" ("Lenin in the Court of God"), "Punjab ke Dehqan se" ("To the Punjab Peasants"); "This is regarded as a milestone in Urdu poetry", according to Indian academic Siser Kumar Das; inspired by Iqbal's 1933 visit to Spain

==== Other Indian languages ====
- Bal Krisna Rav, Abhas, Indian, Hindi-language
- Changampuzha Krishna Pillai, Baspanjali ("Offering of tears"), the author's first poetry collection, Malayalam
- Duvvuri Rami Reddi, translator, Panasala — translation of Omar Khayyám's Rubaiyat from Persian into Telugu
- Jayshankar Prasad, Kamayani, said to be the greatest poem of the Chayavadi (Indian romantic) movement; 15 cantos, each named after an emotion; Hindi
- Mahjoor, "Gristi Kur", Kashmiri poem in the Vatsan form comparing the refreshing traits of peasants as compared with less lively aristocrats; published in the August 1 issue of Hamdard
- Rabindranath Tagore, Ses Saptak, in this and in some of the author's other books in the mid-1930s, he introduced a new rhythm in poetry that "had a tremendous impact on the modern poets", according to Indian academic Sisir Kumar Das; Bengali
- Ulloor Paramesvara Iyer, Dipavali, Malayalam

=== Spanish language ===
==== Peru ====
- Xavier Abril, Difícil trabajo
- Manuel Moreno Jimeno, Los malditos
- Emilio Vasquez, Tawantinsuyo
- Emilio Adolfo von Westphalen, Abolición de la muerte

==== Spain ====
- Vicente Aleixandre:
  - La destrucción o el amor ("Destruction or/as Love")
  - Pasión de la tierra ("Passion of the Earth"), written 1928–1929
- Germán Bleiberg, El cantar de la noche ("The Song of the Night")
- Gabriel Celaya, Marea del silencio ("Tide of Silence")
- Federico García Lorca:
  - Llanto por Ignacio Sánchez Mejías ("Lament for Ignacio Sánchez Mejías")
  - Seis poemas galegos ("Six Galician poems")
- Luis Rosales, Abril ("April")

=== Other languages ===
- Constantine Cavafy, Ποιήματα (Piimata, or "Poems of C.P. Cavafy"), Greece
- Parvin E'tesami, Dirwan, Persia
- Bernard Kangro, Sonetid, Estonia
- Kersti Merilaas, Loomingus, Estonia
- Giorgos Seferis, Μυθιστόρημα ("Tale of Legends"), Greece

== Awards and honors ==
- Pulitzer Prize for Poetry - Audrey Wurdemann, Bright Ambush

== Births ==
Death years link to the corresponding "[year] in poetry" article:

- January 14 – Labhshankar Thakar (died 2016), Indian Gujarati poet, playwright and story writer
- January 16 – Inger Christensen (died 2009), Danish poet, writer, novelist, essayist and children's book author
- January 18 – Jon Stallworthy (died 2014), English poet, literary critic and academic
- January 30 – Richard Brautigan (died 1984), American writer and poet
- January 27 – D. M. Thomas (died 2023), English novelist, poet, and translator from Cornwall
- February 14 – Grigore Vieru (died 2009), Moldovan poet writing in Romanian, strong promoter of the Romanian language in Moldova
- March 13 – Kofi Awoonor (killed 2013), Ghanaian poet and author whose work combines the poetic traditions of his native Ewe people and contemporary and religious symbolism to depict Africa during decolonization
- April 4 – Michael Horovitz (died 2021), German-born English poet, translator, editor and performer
- April 6 – J. P. Clark (died 2020), Nigerian English-language poet and playwright
- April 16 – Sarah Kirsch (died 2013), German
- May 5 – Eddie Linden (died 2023), British poet
- May 13 – Taku Miki 三木卓 pen name of Tomita Miki, Japanese Shōwa period poet and novelist in the Han ("Inundation") poetry circle (Surname: Miki)
- May 14 – Roque Dalton (died 1975), leftist Salvadoran poet and journalist writing about death, love and politics
- May 25 – Jay Wright, African-American poet, playwright and essayist
- May 26 – Michael Benedikt (died 2007), American poet
- June 1 – Clayton Eshleman (die 2021), American poet, translator and editor
- June 6 – Joy Kogawa, Canadian poet and novelist
- June 10 – Rukhl Fishman (died 1984), Israeli poet
- June 12 – Christoph Meckel (died 2020), German poet
- June 24 – Taufiq Ismail, Indonesian poet and activist
- July 2 – Nanni Balestrini (died 2019), Italian experimental poet, author and visual artist of the Neoavanguardia
- July 29 – Pat Lowther (murdered by her husband in 1975), Canadian poet
- August 12 – A. B. Spellman, African-American poet, music critic, music historian, arts administrator and author
- August 24 – Rosmarie Waldrop, German-born American poet and translator (primary English translator of Edmond Jabès)
- August 25 – Charles Wright, American poet
- September 10 – Mary Oliver (died 2018), American poet
- September 20 – Wong Phui Nam (died 2022), Malaysian economist and English-language poet
- September 24 – Robert Kelly, American poet associated with the deep image group
- September 30 – Arturo Corcuera (died 2017), Peruvian poet
- November 7 – Wahyu Sulaiman Rendra (died 2009), Indonesian poet, born Willibrordus Surendra Broto Rendra, popularly known as W. S. Rendra and also as "Si Burung Merak" and "The Peacock"
- November 15 – Gustaf Sobin (died 2005), American expatriate poet and novelist
- December 1 – George Bowering, Canadian novelist, poet, historian and biographer
- December 10 – Shūji Terayama 寺山 修司 (died 1983), Japanese avant-garde poet, playwright, writer, film director and photographer (surname: Terayama)
- December 13 – Adélia Prado, Brazilian poet
- December 25 – Bhupi Sherchan (died 1989), Nepali poet
- December 27 – Syed Shamsul Haque (died 2016), Bengali poet, lyricist, playwright and essayist
- December 29 – Yevgeny Rein (Евгений Рейн), Russian poet
- Also
  - Johari M. Amini (aka Jewel Christine McLawler Latimore and Johari M. Kunjufu), African American
  - James Applewhite, American
  - Sam Cornish, African American
  - Russell Edson (died 2014), American
  - Andrew Hoyem, American typographer, letterpress printer, publisher, poet and preservationist; founder and director of Arion Press in San Francisco
  - Desmond O'Grady, Irish poet and translator; former editor of The Transatlantic Review and organizer of the Spoleto International Poetry Festival
  - David R. Slavitt, American writer and translator
  - Ahmos Zu-Bolton II, African American

== Deaths ==
Birth years link to the corresponding "[year] in poetry" article:

- March 26 – Tekkan Yosano 与謝野 鉄幹 (born 1873), pen-name of Yosano Hiroshi, late Meiji period, Taishō and early Shōwa period Japanese author and poet; husband of author Yosano Akiko; grandfather of cabinet minister and politician Kaoru Yosano
- April 6 – Edwin Arlington Robinson (born 1869), American poet, three-time Pulitzer Prize winner
- July 17 – George William Russell (born 1867), Anglo-Irish supporter of Irish nationalism, critic, poet, and painter who wrote under the pseudonym Æ, mystical writer, and centre of a group of followers of theosophy
- August 11 – Sir William Watson (born 1858), English traditionalist poet noted for the political content of his verse
- September 18 – Alice Dunbar Nelson (born 1875), African American poet, journalist and political activist during the Harlem Renaissance; married to poet Paul Laurence Dunbar
- November 23 – Louise Mack (born 1870) Australian poet, journalist and novelist
- November 30 – Fernando Pessoa (born 1888), Portuguese poet and writer; cause of death listed as cirrhosis
- December 17 – Lizette Woodworth Reese (born 1856), American poet

== See also ==
- Poetry
- List of poetry awards
- List of years in poetry
