= National Museum of Science and Technology (Spain) =

Technology museum in La Coruña and Alcobendas, Spain

- Museo Nacional de Ciencia y Tecnología
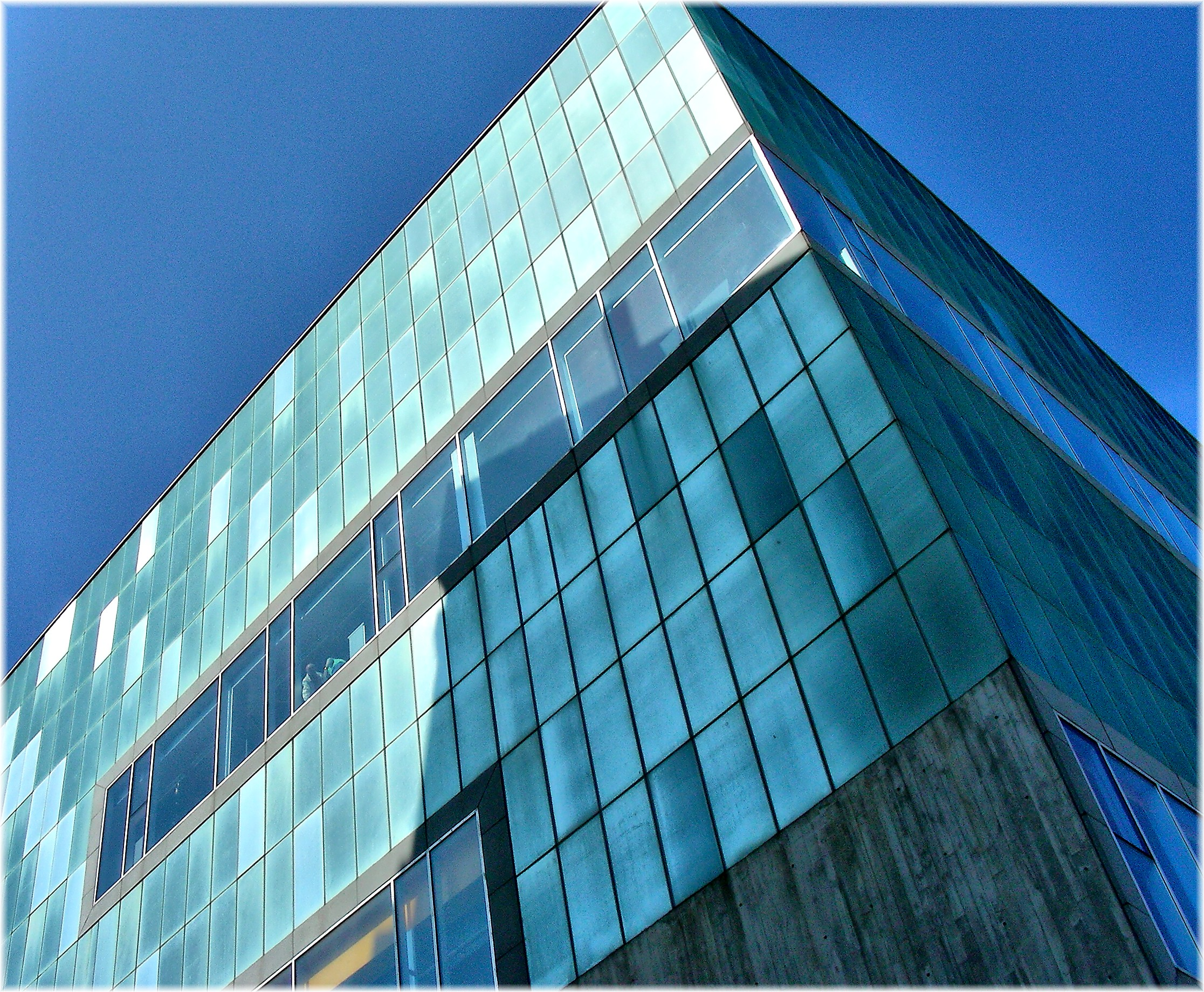
- La Coruña MUNCYT façade
- Established: 30 June 1980
- Location: La Coruña and Alcobendas, Spain
- Coordinates: 43.3732°N 8.4203°W
- Type: Technology museum
- Collection size: 19,000
- Website: http://www.muncyt.es/

The National Museum of Science and Technology (Spanish: Museo Nacional de Ciencia y Tecnología – MUNCYT) is a technology museum in Spain devoted to technology promotion and preservation. It owns a collection of more than 19,000 scientific instruments, technological devices, vehicles, machines and industrial tools from the 16th century until nowadays. Dependent on the Ministry of Science, it is one of the National Museums of Spain, and it is managed by the Spanish Foundation for Science and Technology (FECYT).

The museum was established on 30 June 1980 and its first location was opened on 1997 in the old Delicias railway station building in Madrid sharing premises with the Railway Museum. The museum current main exhibition hall is in La Coruña, opened on 4 May 2012, with a second exhibition hall in Alcobendas (Madrid) opened on 12 December 2014. The museum is a member of the International Council of Museums science & technology committee (CIMUSET) and of the European Network of Science Centres and Museums (ECSITE).

Among the pieces in display at La Coruña are the front section of the "Lope de Vega", an Iberia Boeing 747 in service between 1981 and 2003, airplane that brought Picasso's Guernica to Spain in September 1981, the prototype of the "Mechanical Encyclopedia", the 1949 mechanical precursor to the electronic book, by Spanish inventor Ángela Ruiz Robles, a replica of the stratonautical space suit, the 1935 precursor to the space suit, by engineer Emilio Herrera, the Fresnel lens used between 1857 and 1904 at the Tower of Hercules lighthouse and the first computer arriving in Spain, an IBM 650 computer bought by Renfe in 1959.

== Gallery ==
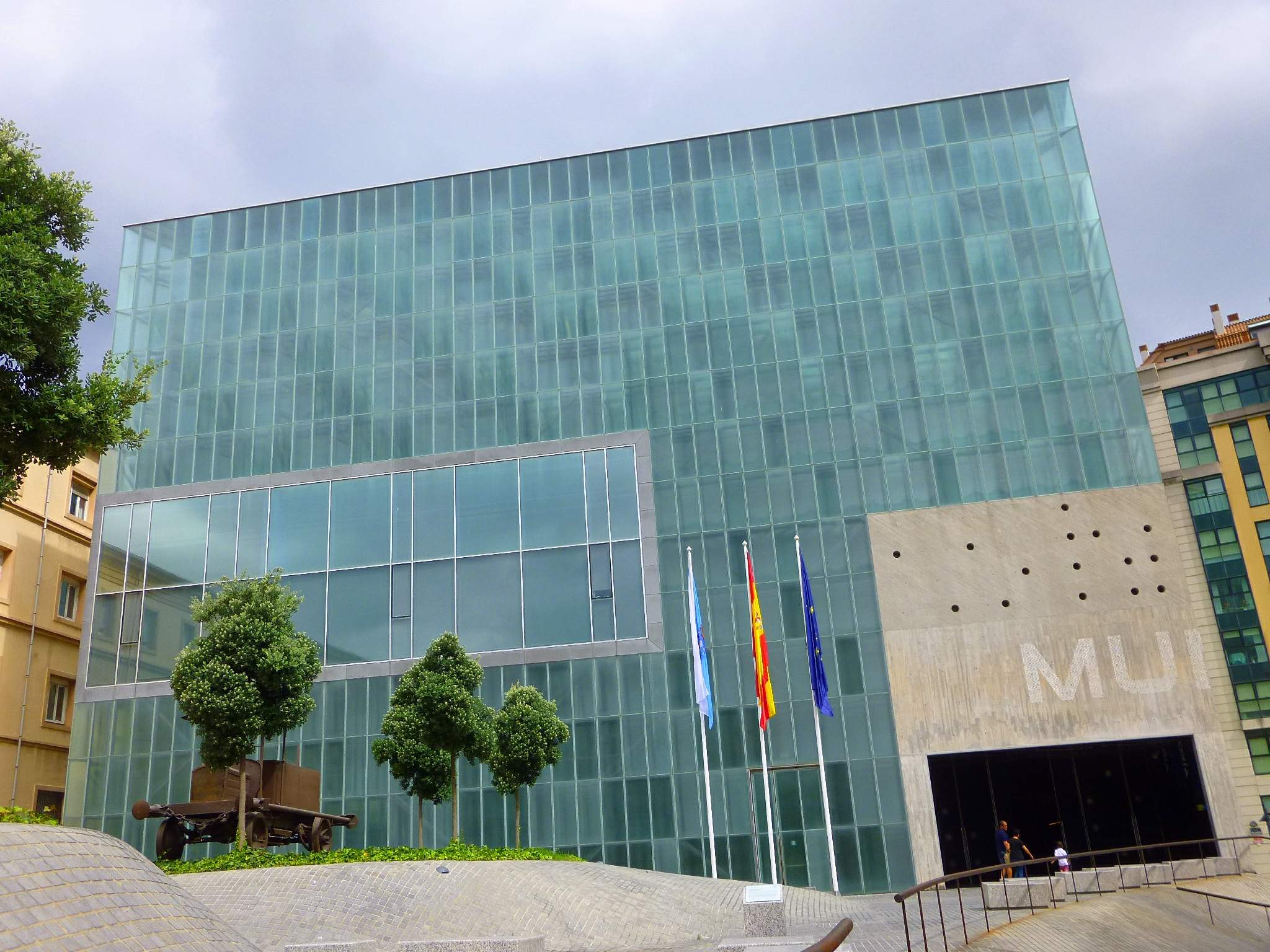
La Coruña hall main entrance.

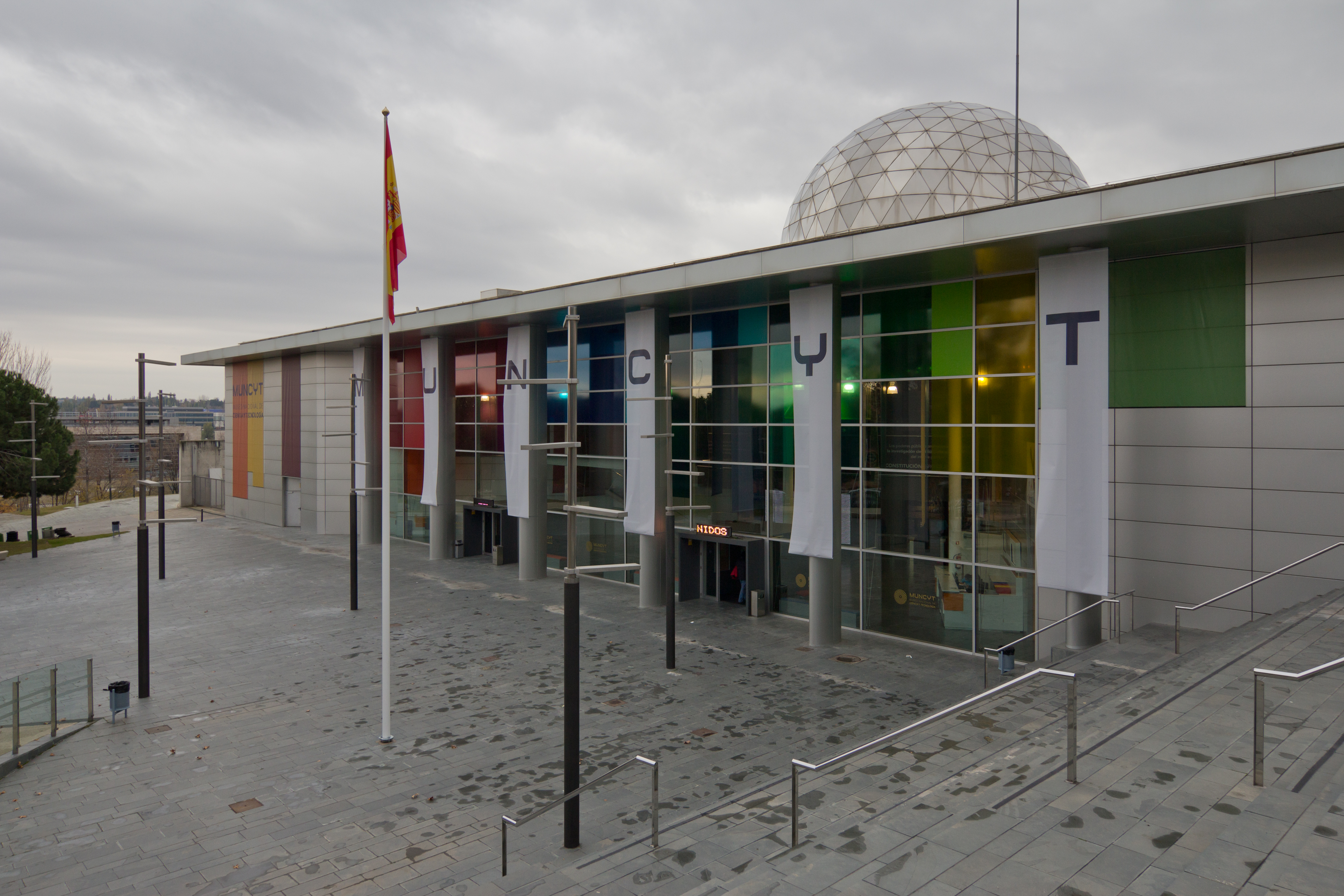
Alcobendas hall main entrance.

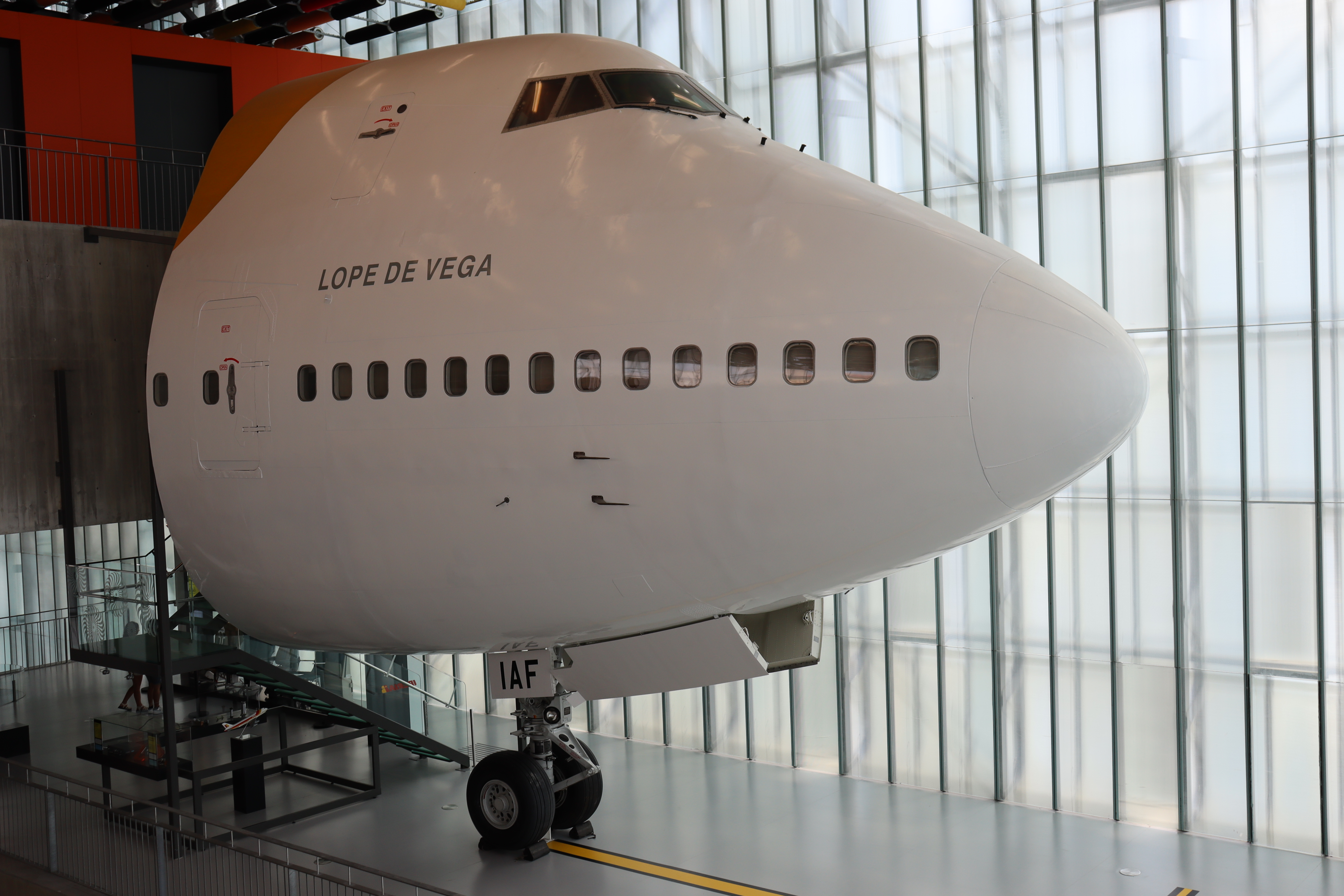
Iberia Boeing 747 "Lope de Vega" front section.

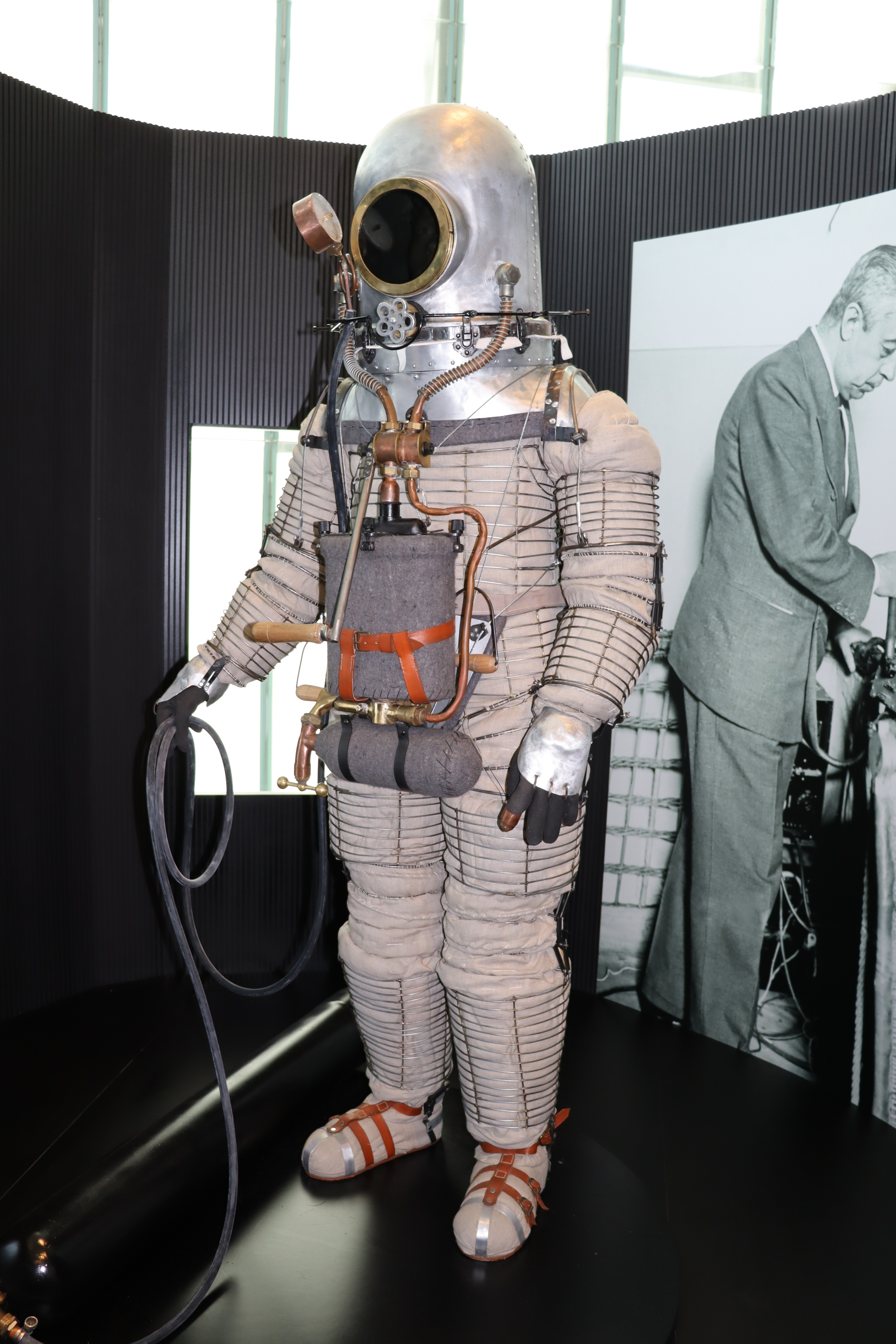
Replica of the stratonautical space suit.

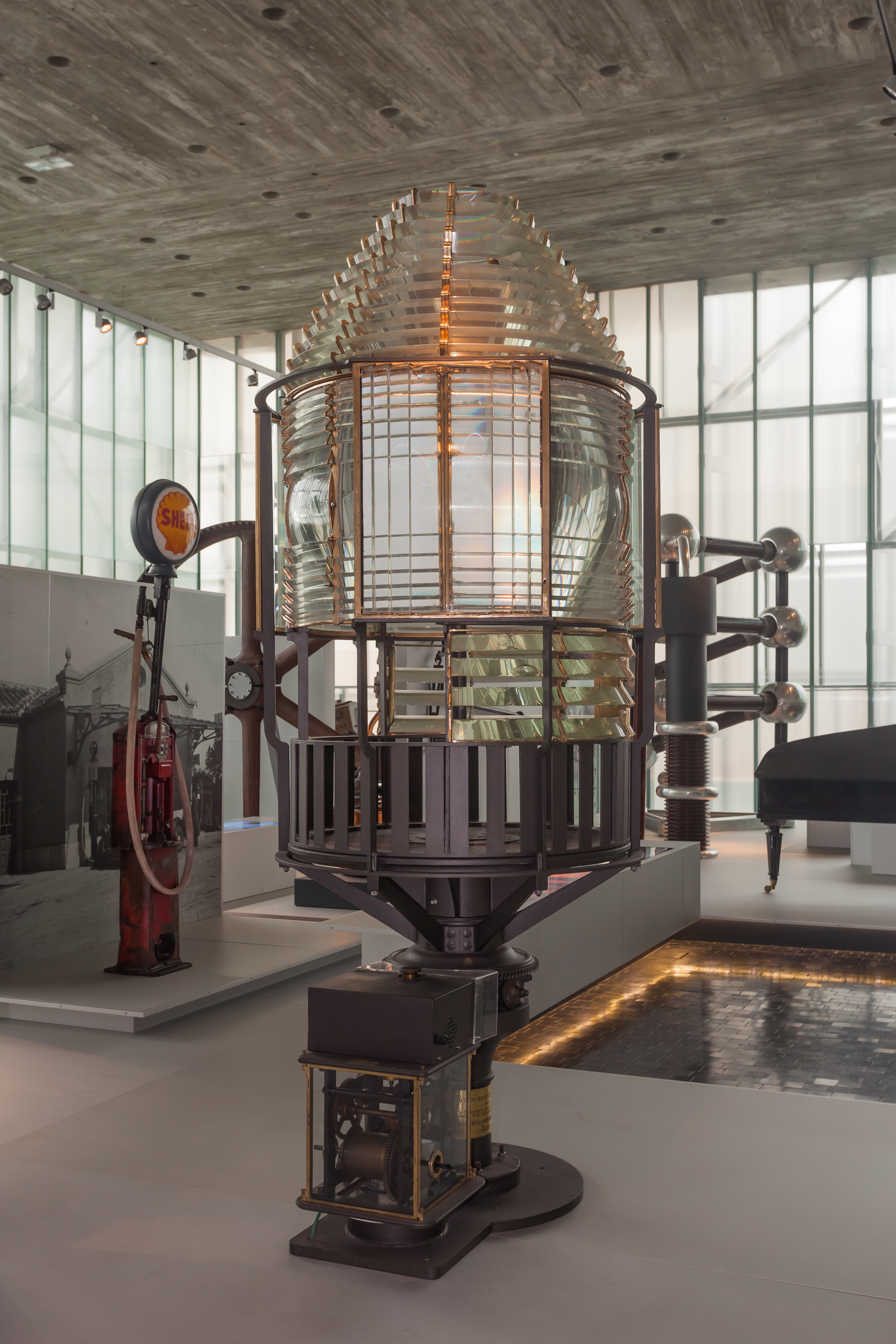
Fresnel lens used in the Tower of Hercules (1857–1904).

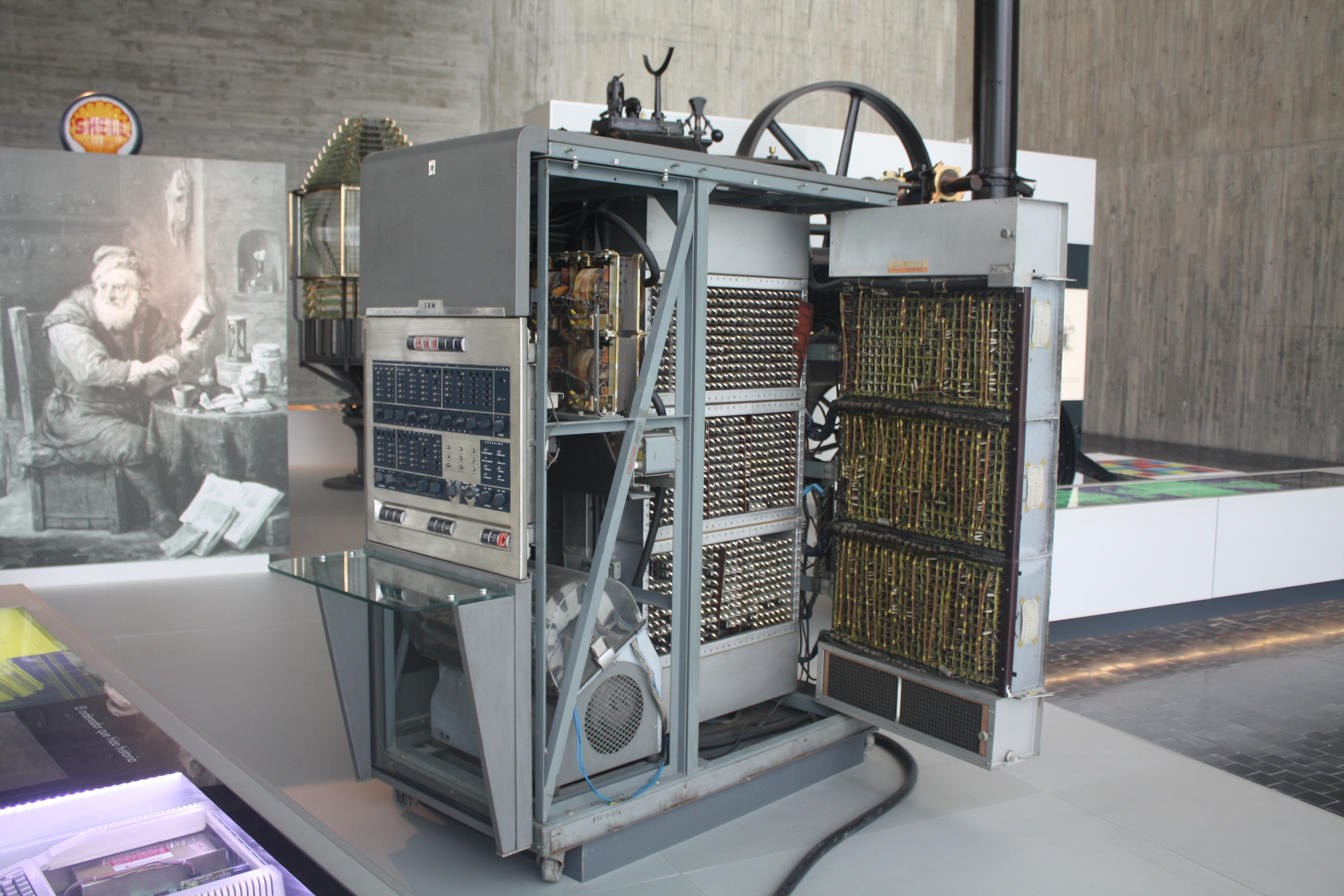
The first computer in Spain (1959), side view of the IBM 650 Console Unit.

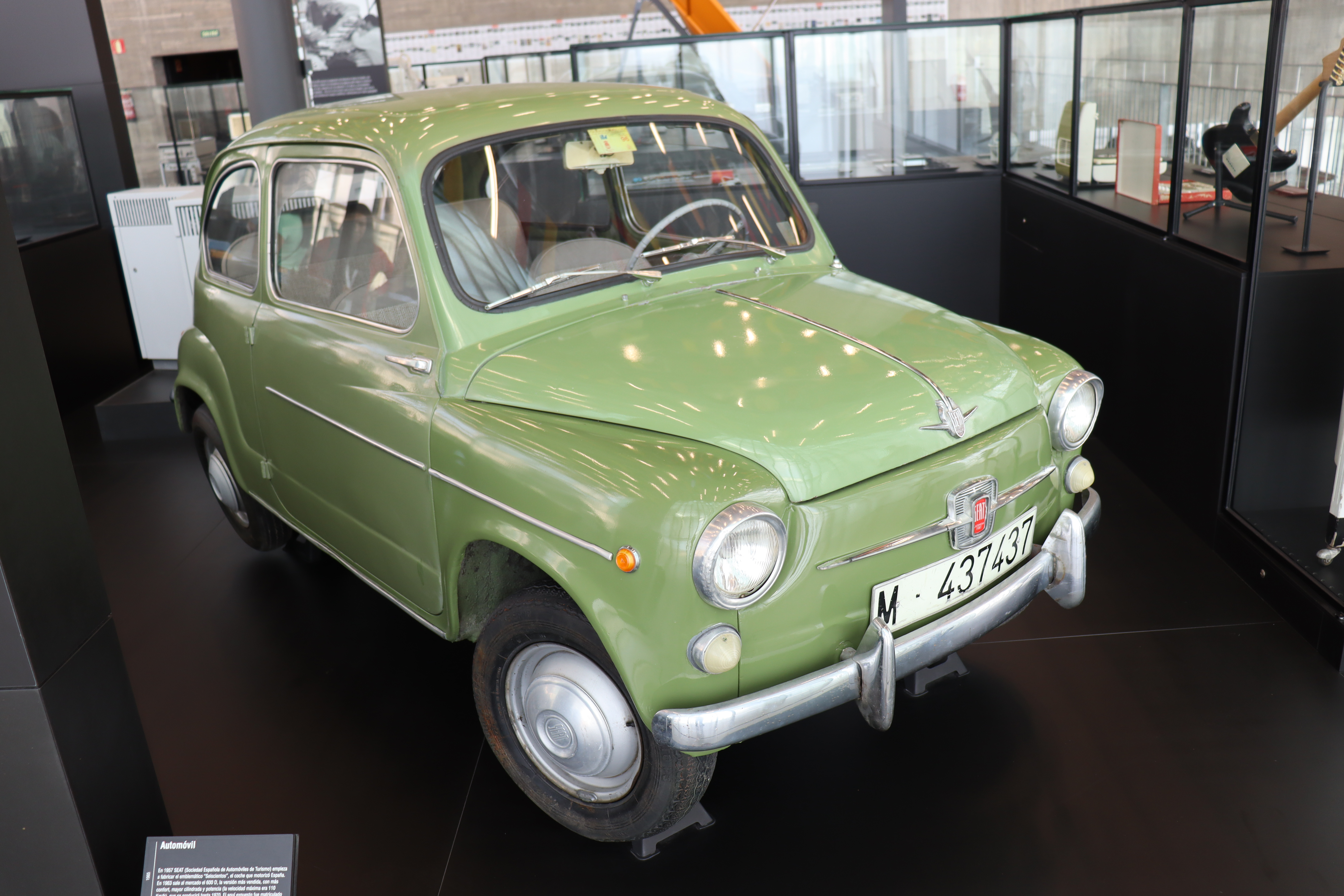
SEAT 600 D (1965).
