= Generation of '36 =

Group of Spanish artists

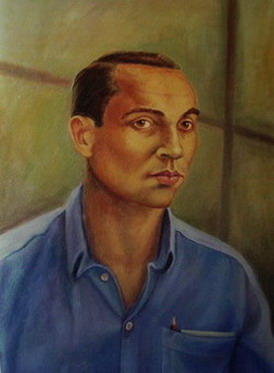
Miguel's Pencil. Oil painting by Ramón Fernández Palmeral

The Generation of '36 (Spanish: Generación del 36) is the name given to a group of Spanish artists, poets and playwrights who were working about the time of the Spanish Civil War (1936–1939).

The Generation of '36 was a literary movement that suffered harsh criticism and persecution that followed from the division of neighbours into winners and losers in the various battles of that struggle, as well as from the physical hardships and moral miseries arising from social instability and political chaos.

Ricardo Gullón listed some of the authors associated with this movement since he was closely associated as a contributor and a literary critic of the genre.

The Generation of '36 had membership criteria that were not rigid, but the label provides a convenient portfolio of the cultural and literary style of the contemporary period, covering individual works, literary collections, magazines, journals newspapers and other publications that document the experiences of creative people working during the difficult and frightening civil war.

== Poets ==
The poets of Generación del 36 include:

- Miguel Hernández
- Luis Rosales
- Leopoldo Panero and Juan Panero
- Luis Felipe Vivanco
- Ildefonso-Manuel Gil
- Germán Bleiberg
- José Antonio Muñoz Rojas
- José María Luelmo
- Pedro Pérez Clotet
- Rafael Duyos
- Celso Amieva
- Gabriel Celaya
- Arturo Serrano Plaja
- José Herrera Petere
- Juan Gil-Albert

== Writers ==
The writers of prose included in Generación del 36:

- Enrique Azcoaga
- José Antonio Maravall
- Antonio Sánchez Barbudo
- Ramón Faraldo
- Eusebio García Luengo
- María Zambrano
- Antonio Rodríguez Moñino
- José Ferrater Mora
- Ricardo Gullón
- Carmen LaFloret

== Raconteurs ==
Famous Generación del 36 raconteurs:

- Camilo José Cela
- Gonzalo Torrente Ballester
- Miguel Delibes

== Dramatists and playwrights ==
Performance works of the epoch included Antonio Buero Vallejo.

== Important contributors ==
Others who started working at the end or after the Civil War include the Garcilasismo group and:

- Dionisio Ridruejo
- José Luis Cano
- Ramón de Garciasol
- Pedro Laín Entralgo
- Juan López Morillas
- José Luis Aranguren
- Julián Marías
- Juan Rof Carballo
- Segundo Serrano Poncela
- Juan Antonio Gaya Nuño
- José Suárez Carreño
- Jorge Campos (writer)
- Ernesto Guerra da Cal
- José Manuel Blecua

== See also ==
- Generation of '27
