= Disenchantment (disambiguation) =

Disenchantment is the cultural rationalization and devaluation of religion in society, or more broadly a general loss of enthusiasm for something.

Disenchantment may also refer to:

- Disenchantment (TV series), an American animated television series
- Disenchantment: The Guardian and Israel, a 2004 book by Daphna Baram
- El desencanto (The Disenchantment), a 1976 Spanish film directed by Jaime Chávarri
- Disenchantment Bay (Alaska)
- Disenchantment, a 1922 book by Charles Edward Montague

== See also ==
- Disenchanted (disambiguation)
