= Hercules Separates Mounts Calpe and Abylla =

Painting by Francisco de Zurbarán

- Hércules separa los montes Calpe y Abyla (Spanish)
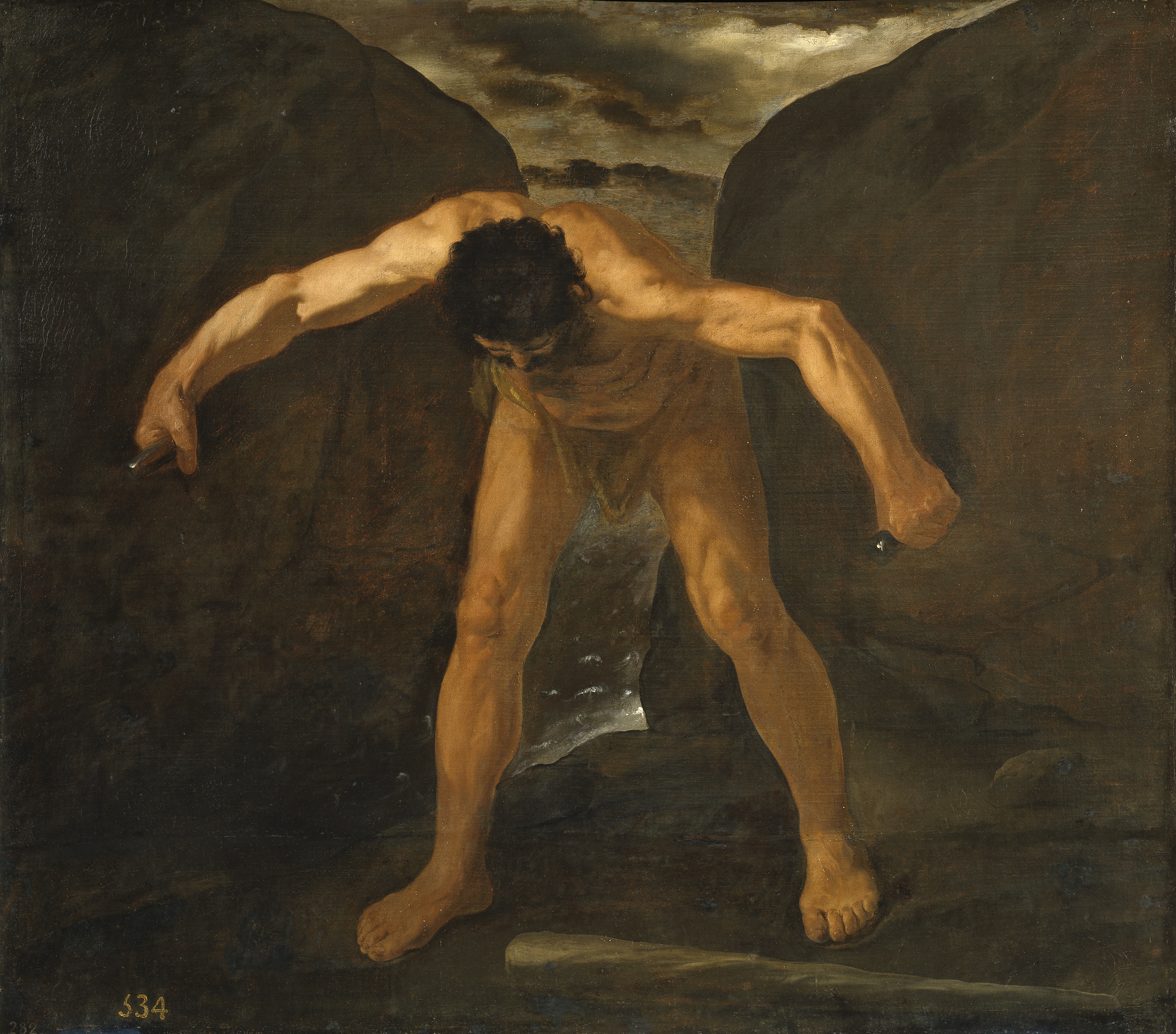
- Artist: Francisco de Zurbarán
- Year: 1634
- Medium: oil on canvas
- Dimensions: 136 cm × 167 cm (54 in × 66 in)
- Location: Museo del Prado; Madrid

Hercules Separates Mounts Calpe and Abylla is a work by Francisco de Zurbarán, created in 1634.

== Description ==
The painting measures 136 × 167 centimeters. It is in the collection of the Museo del Prado.

== Analysis ==
The painting shows Hercules. He separates the two mountains Calpe and Abyla, also known as Pillars of Hercules.

This also shows how Hercules is only using his fists and no other weapons to separate Mounts Calpe and Abylla

It is included in a 10 works series about the Labors of Hercules commanded by Philip IV of Spain for the Hall of Realms of the Buen Retiro Palace. The series is now conserved in the Museo del Prado.

== Bibliography ==
- Juan Antonio Gaya Nuño and Tiziana Frati, La obra Pictórica de Zurbarán, Planeta, Barcelona, 1988, ISBN 84-320-2866-5 pp. 131–132.
- Blocked. (2025). Blogspot.com. https://gibraltar-intro.blogspot.com/2015/10/bc-pillars-of-hercules-if-ordinary.html
