= El desencanto =

- Theatrical release poster
- Directed by: Jaime Chávarri
- Written by: Jaime Chávarri
- Produced by: Elías Querejeta
- Starring: Felicidad Blanc; Leopoldo María Panero; Juan Luis Panero; Michi Panero
- Cinematography: Teo Escamilla
- Edited by: José Salcedo
- Release date: 17 September 1976
- Running time: 97 minutes
- Country: Spain
- Language: Spanish

El desencanto (The Disenchantment) is a 1976 Spanish documentary film written and directed by Jaime Chávarri about the family of famous poet Leopoldo Panero. It tells the story of the Panero family told by themselves twelve years after the death of patriarch Leopoldo Panero, a poet of Francoist Spain. The documentary is based on the testimony of the remaining four members: the poet's widow, Felicidad Blanc, and the couple's three sons: Juan Luis, Leopoldo Maria and Michi. In their intertwined testimonies, they deal with family relations, the weight of their shared past and about themselves.

El desencanto was made towards the end of Francoist Spain and was released during the Spanish transition to democracy becoming a symbol of the decadence of the Francoist family. El desencanto is considered a seminal work among Spanish documentaries and has achieved cult status.

Twenty years later Ricardo Franco made a second part, Después de tantos años (After so many years) (1994). By then the mother has already died, but the three brothers were interviewed.

== Synopsis ==
The Panero family is an illustrious traditional family from Astorga with literary links spanning several generations. The patriarch, Leopoldo Panero, was the best regarded poet in Spain during his time. He died suddenly of a heart condition in 1962. Twelve years later, his widow, the still beautiful and elegant Felicidad Blanc, in the company of two of her sons Juan Luis and Michi, is shown in an outdoor homage to the late poet.

Felicidad Blanc, with a calm and cultured voice, tells about the memories of her youth during the Spanish civil war and her courtship with the famous poet. A medical doctor's daughter from Madrid's upper middle class, she became upon her marriage a traditional Spanish wife completely overshadowed by her domineering, famous husband. She dedicated her life to her husband, their three sons and the family home in Astorga. The death of her husband brought the family's financial decline and she was forced to sell family properties while raising her sons alone. The three brothers, all cultured and well spoken, had literary ambitions. The two eldest, Juan Luis and Leopoldo María, became distinguished poets in their own right. Juan Luis and his younger brother Michi discuss the family's troubles, but as there is a rivalry between Juan Luis and Leopoldo María they do not share screen time.

Juan Luis, ironic and scathing, talks about his travels, his friends in literary circles including Jorge Luis Borges, reserving his resentment for his family. His relationship with his father was distant. Michi, the youngest sibling, began many careers without finishing any. He seems unable to find his place in life. Ultimately it was the middle brother, Leopoldo María, who achieved literary recognition as a poet, following in the footsteps of his father. His success only cemented the rivalry with his resentful older brother. However, Leopoldo María is also the most troubled of the three brothers. The siblings, like their father and many relatives, have problems with alcoholism to which Leopoldo María added drug addiction, periods in jail for his leftist activities, any many stays in psychiatric clinics. He is featured in the documentary as a talkative young man brooding because of his early convalescence and psychotic episodes. However, he displays a clear insight and black humour about his own destructive life and his dysfunctional family. Leopoldo reserves his resentment towards his mother who interned him in a psychiatric hospital after a suicide attempt.

Felicidad Blanc recounts multiple visits to her troubled son in jail, her efforts and failures raising her sons while dealing with the family's economic decline. With a more romantic view of the past, but admitting her failures, Felicidad defends herself from the attacks of her two youngest sons.
