= Panerai (surname) =

Panerai is a surname. Notable people with the surname include:

- Carla Panerai (born 1947), Italian sprint runner
- Rolando Panerai (1924–2019), Italian singer
- Ruggero Panerai (1862–1923), Italian painter
- Umberto Panerai (born 1953), Italian water polo player

== See also ==
- Panera
- Panero
- Panerai
- Panerai (disambiguation)
