= Madrid–Cuatro Vientos Airport =

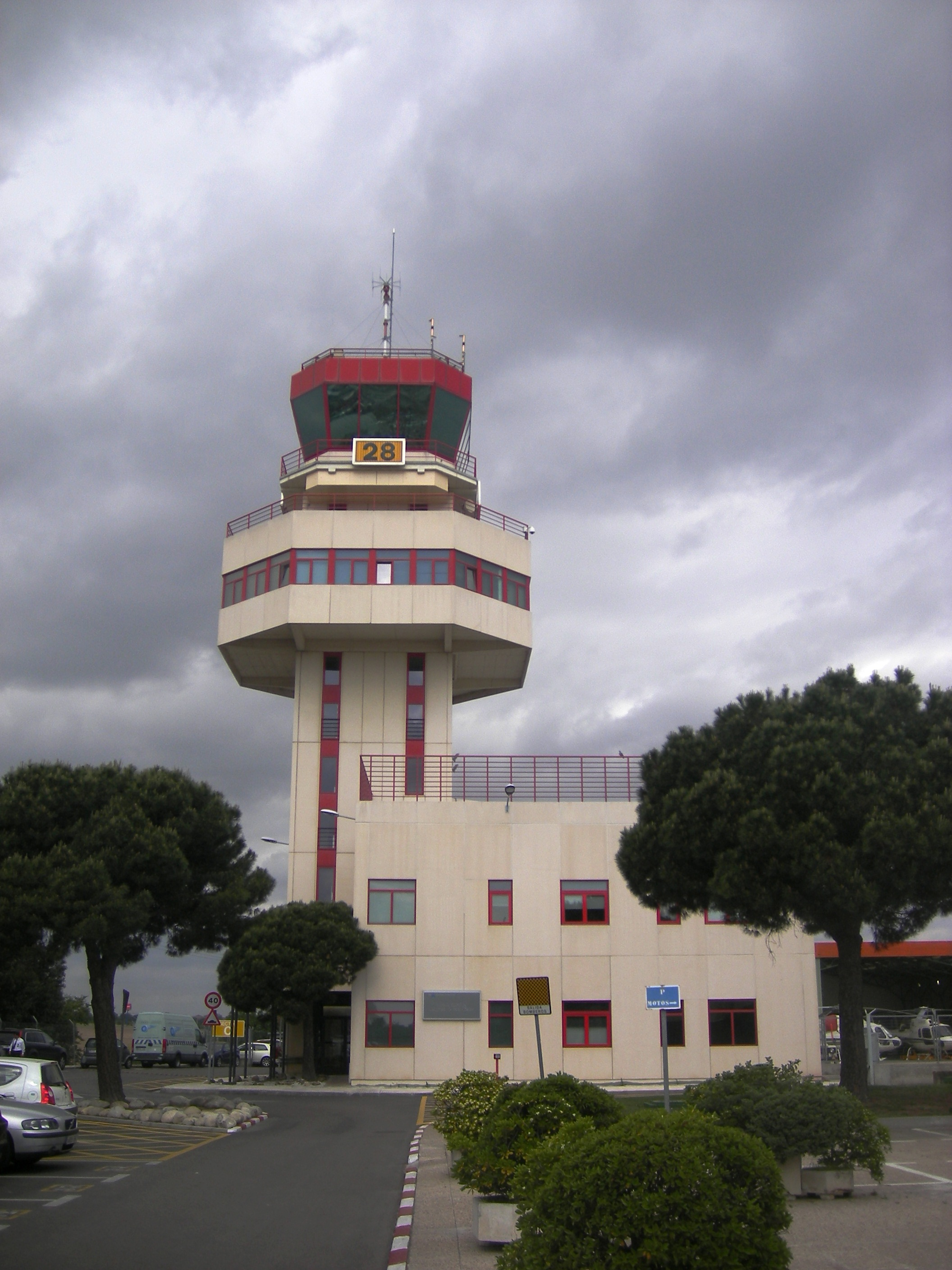
- Cuatro Vientos Airport Control Tower
- IATA: none; ICAO: LECU/LEVS

Summary
- Airport type: Public/Military
- Operator: AENA
- Location: Madrid
- Hub for: Flylink Express
- Elevation AMSL: 2,269 ft (692 m)
- Coordinates: 40°22′14″N 3°47′06″W

Map
- Location within Spain

Runways
Direction	Length		Surface
Direction	ft	m	Surface
09/27	4,900	1,494	Asphalt
09L/27R	3,698	1,127	Grass–Earth

Statistics (2016)
- Movements: 35,640
- Movements change 15-16: ▼11.5%
- Sources: Aena

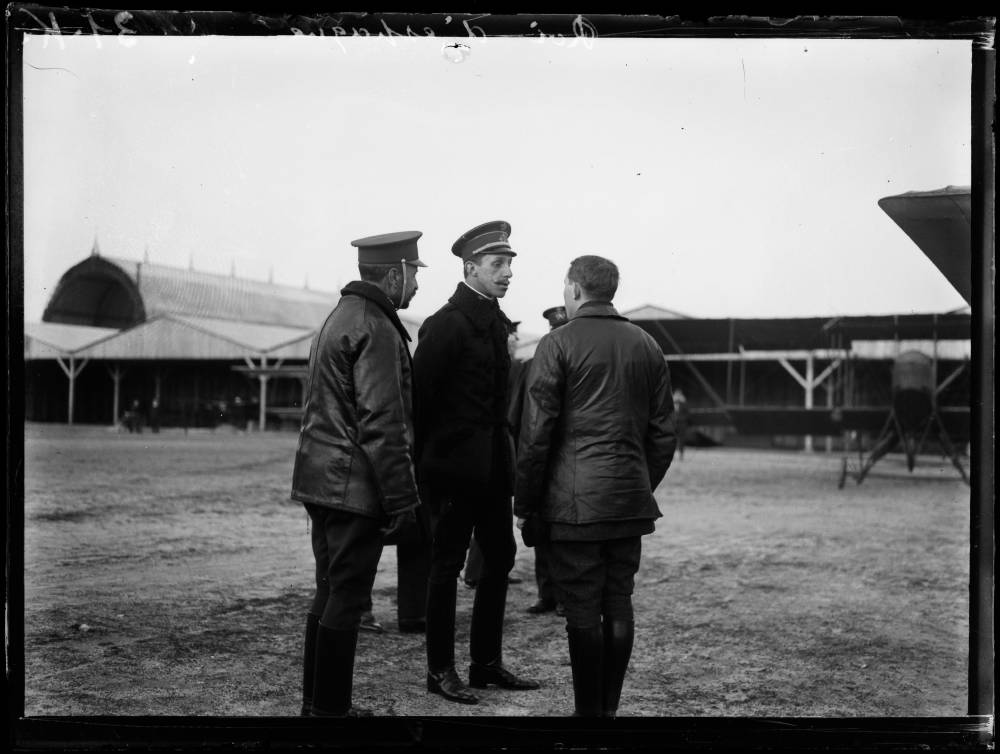
King Alfonso XIII of Spain at the aerodrome

Madrid–Cuatro Vientos Airport (ICAO: LECU), also known as Cuatro Vientos Airport, is the oldest airport in Spain, established in 1911 (115 years ago) and one of the three civil airports of Madrid along with Madrid–Barajas and Madrid–Torrejón Airport. The airport is located 8 km (5.0 mi) southwest of the city centre. The name "Cuatro Vientos" [ˈkwatɾo ˈβjentos] translates into English as "Four Winds".

Cuatro Vientos was originally an air base, which later became also a civil airport. Thus, there is a military section located on a separate apron of the airport, opposite to the civil one. It is also used as the Madrid base for aircraft of the Spanish Police, as well as for the road traffic surveillance helicopters.

== History ==
On 31 July 1919, English aviator James Arthur Peters made the first non-stop flight from the UK to Spain. He flew an Alliance aircraft, a Seabird P1 that he had designed, from Hendon airport to Cuatro Vientos in 9 hours. His navigator was named as Curtiss. He carried a letter for the Queen of Spain from Mr Gillow the owner of the company that made the aircraft. Peters later flew back to the UK and named his house in Kings Langley, Herts. 'Cuatro Vientos'.

Emilio Herrera Linares created an aerodynamics laboratory. In 1936, he tested there his stratonautical space suit, a precursor of the space suit to explore the stratosphere. The start of the Spanish Civil War cancelled the planned balloon trip to test it.

== Infrastructure ==
This airport is mainly used by general aviation aircraft, Flight Training Organizations and flying clubs. Due to the runway length and surrounding buildings it is only possible to operate helicopters, piston engine aircraft, medium size turbo-props and small business jets. The only navigational aid is a non-directional beacon.

The Museum of Aeronautics and Astronautics, an air and space museum mainly dedicated to the Spanish Air and Space Force, is located on the southern side of the airport.

== Accidents and incidents ==
- In September 1976, Douglas C-53 T.3-57 of the Ejército del Aire was involved in an accident at Cuatro Vientos AFB and subsequently withdrawn from use.
- In May 2013, a Hispano HA-200D Saeta of the Fundación Infante de Orleans crashed during an aerobatic show at Cuatro Vientos Airport. The pilot died and several people on the ground were injured.
