= Juan Antonio Gaya Nuño =

Spanish art historian, author, teacher and art critic

- Born: 29 January 1913; Tardelcuende, Soria, Spain
- Died: 6 July 1976 (aged 63); Madrid, Spain
- Education: Complutense University of Madrid
- Occupations: art historian, author, teacher, art critic
- Spouse: Concha de Marco (m. 1937–1976)

Juan Antonio Gaya Nuño (1913–1976) was a Spanish art historian, author, teacher, and art critic. He was a member of the Generation of '36 (Spanish: Generación del 36).

== Biography ==
Juan Antonio Gaya Nuño was born on 29 January 1913 in Tardelcuende, in the Province of Soria, Spain. His father Juan Antonio Gaya Tovar was a noted professor, physician and politician in Spain, and his mother was Gregoria Nuño Ortega.

He attended the University of Madrid (now called Complutense University of Madrid), where he graduated with a doctorate in 1935. His thesis was titled, El Románico en la Provincia de Soria (English: The Romanesque in the Province of Soria).

During the outbreak of the Spanish Civil War in 1936, he served in the Republican army and eventually reached the rank of Captain. He was married to poet and essayist Concha de Marco in 1937 during the war. The Francoist Spain regime sentenced Gaya Nuño to prison for twenty years, and was granted parole on February 23, 1943.

He wrote 70 books, and more than 700 short publications, between 1943 and 1976.

Gaya Nuño died on 6 July 1976 in Madrid, Spain.
