= Ángela Ruiz Robles =

Spanish teacher and inventor

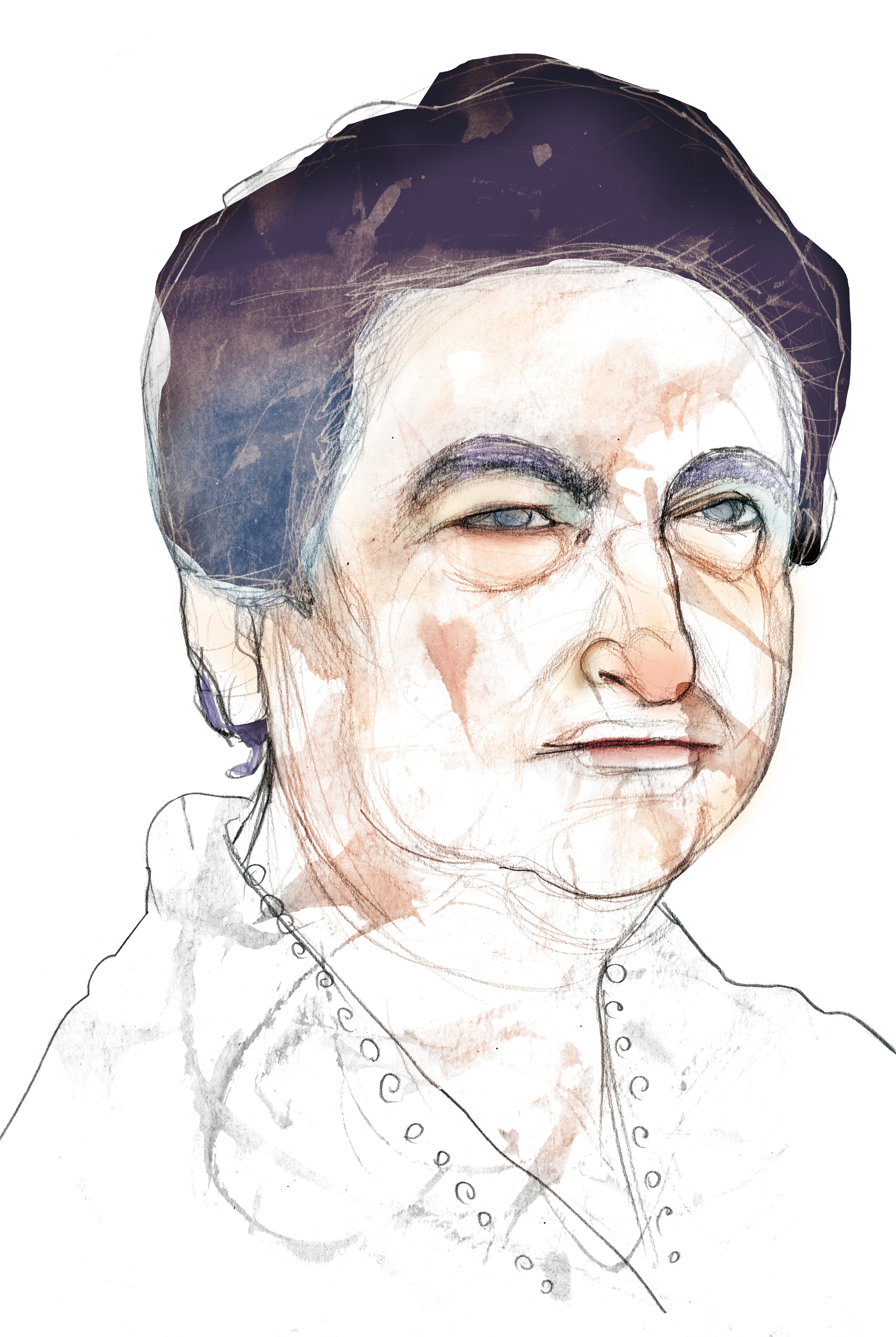

Personal details
- Born: Ángela Ruiz Robles; March 28, 1895 Villamanín, Leon
- Died: October 27, 1975 (aged 80) Ferrol, A Coruña
- Parents: Elena Robles; Feliciano Ruiz
- Occupation: Teacher, Inventor

Ángela Ruiz Robles (March 28, 1895 in Villamanín, León – October 27, 1975 in Ferrol, A Coruña) was a Spanish teacher, writer, pioneer and inventor of the mechanical precursor to the electronic book, invented 20 years prior to Michael Hart’s Project Gutenberg, commonly referred to as the true inventor of the e-book, and over half a century before present-day e-books. She received two patents related to her “Mechanical Encyclopedia” (Spanish: la Enciclopedia Mecánica). In 1949, Ruiz was awarded Spanish patent 190,698 for mechanisms with buttons that, when activated and pressed, displayed the learning materials. In her second patent, 276,364, awarded in 1962, she modified the design to remove buttons and instead include rotational reels that presented the subjects and learning materials. (Spanish: la Enciclopedia Mecánica).

As someone deeply caring for her students and passionate about education, Ruiz Robles designed her mechanical encyclopedia to lighten the weight of the books carried by her students, make learning more attractive, and adapt learning materials to the needs of each student. Her device consisted of a series of text and illustrations on reels, all under a sheet of magnifying glass with a light for reading in the dark, and was to incorporate spoken descriptions of each topic. Her device was never put into production but a prototype is in display at the National Museum of Science and Technology in A Coruña.

== Biography ==
Ángela Ruiz Robles, also known as "Doña Angelita", was born on March 28, 1895, in Villamanín, León. She was born into a well-off family, as the daughter of Feliciano Ruiz, a pharmacist and Elena Robles, a housewife. She studied to become a teacher at a college in Leon and started her professional career in the capital of the province as an instructor of stenography, typing and commercial accounting between 1915 and 1916. In 1917, her municipal council unanimously named her teacher and director of La Pola de Gordón school, located in León. There, she married her husband, Andrés Grandal, a merchant seaman, and had three daughters, Elena, Elvira, and Maria Carmen.

One year later, in 1918 she moved to Santa Uxía de Mandiá, a small village close to Ferrol, Galicia, where she serve as a teacher until 1928. In 1934 she carried out an important work as manager of the National Girls School Orphanage in Ferrol.

In 1948 she started to work as a teacher at the Ibañez Martín School, became director in 1959 and stayed in the position until her retirement.

Ángela Ruiz Robles lived in a time during and after Spain’s Civil War. In early 20th century Spain, only 25% of the female population knew how to read and write, and the female illiteracy rate was 60% higher than in men. Women were primarily housewives, with most of them hardly having the most basic education. For that reason, Ruiz Robles’ work and accomplishments are that more significant and worthy of being highlighted.

Ángela Ruiz Robles was known for her work in education and for advocating changes to teaching methods used at the time. Her books, inventions, and career focused on improving educational accessibility and adapting instruction to students' needs. In her spare time, Doña Angelita taught free night lessons to people with limited financial resources. She was also known for visiting her students’ homes to help reinforce classroom material.

Ruiz Robles died in 1975 in Ferrol. Up until her death, Ruiz Robles paid all her patent fees for her mechanical book.

== Works and legacy ==
Between 1938 and 1946 Ruiz Robles published 16 books to help children study.

In 1944, Ángela Ruiz Robles carried out the project of the Grammatical Scientific Atlas to help expand the knowledge on grammar, syntax, morphology, orthography and phonetics across the country. She later designed and improved a tachymecanographic machine.

In 1948 she patented the first proposal for the Mechanical Encyclopaedia (Spanish patent number 190,698). In her patent, she stated the objectives of her invention were to lighten the weight of student's school bags, improve the learning process, and make learning more intuitive and enjoyable.

In 1962, Ángela Ruiz Robles applied for a second patent, 276,346, for her Mechanical Encyclopedia idea through a more simplified device. A prototype following this design was built in 1962. Her prototype was made of bronze, wood, and zinc. However, the invention never reached the public since it was not possible for her to find the appropriate funding.

She was the founder, director, and professor at the academy for adults Elmaca, which she named after the initials of her three daughters.

In 1970, Ruiz Robles rejected a proposal to license her patents in the United States. She wanted her invention to be developed in Spain because "Ferrol was its starting ground". Since 2006, her Mechanical Encyclopedia was part of the Pedagogical Museum of Galicia, in Santiago de Compostela. In 2012, it was moved to the National Museum of Science and Technology in A Coruña Spain, and has been there ever since.

== Mechanical Encyclopaedia ==
The following is a translated description of the device:

When opened, it consists of two parts. On the left there is a series of automatic alphabets, in any language: slight pressure on a button displays the required letters, making words, sentences, a lesson or a topic, and all manner of writings.

In the upper right-hand part of the alphabets is a coil with all manner of line drawings, and on the left there is another coil with ornamental and figure drawings. In the lower part of the alphabets there is a plastic sheet for writing, editing or drawing. On the inside there is a box where subjects can be stored.

The subjects are stored in the right-hand part, passing beneath a transparent, unbreakable sheet; these can be enlarged, and the books can be illuminated so that they can still be read if there is otherwise no light. The right-hand and left-hand sides of the section the materials pass through contain two coils in which the books the user wants to read in any language are placed; moving these allows all the topics to pass by, stopping as and when the user wishes, or to be collected. The coils are automatic and can be moved from the box and expanded, so that the whole subject remains visible. The device may be placed either on a table (like an ordinary book) or perpendicular to it, which is handy for the user, since it eliminates a great deal of mental and physical effort. All the components are replaceable. When closed, it is the same size as an ordinary book, and easy to handle. For authors and publishers it greatly reduces production costs, for it does not require either paste or binding, and can be printed either in a single print run, or section by section (if there are several)—a procedure of value to all.

== Awards and honours ==
Throughout her life, Ángela Ruiz Robles received a number of awards and recognitions both nationally and internationally for her inventions, despite them never going into production.

- The Civil Order of Alfonso X the Wise to recognize her social work and innovation in training along professional career (1947).
- The Gold Medal at an Exhibition for Spanish inventors (1952).
- The Oscar for invention at the Official and National Fair of Zaragoza (1957).
- The Bronze Medal at the International Exhibition in Brussels (1957).
- The Bronze Medal for educational innovation in Brussels (1958).
- The Silver Medal at the International Exhibition of Inventions in Brussels (1963).
- Medal at the Seville Exhibition (1964).
- Geneva Medal for Spanish inventors (1968).

She appears in the 2011 Spanish publication 200 Years of Patents in the "Women" section, published by the Spanish Ministry of Industry.

Ruiz Robles’s 121st birthday was the subject of a Google Doodle on March 28, 2016.

In 2018, a street was named after her in the Spanish capital to recognize and celebrate her contributions.

In November 2023, her obituary was published as part of the New York Times' Overlooked No More series.

== See also ==
- Memex
