= Juan Panero =

Spanish poet

Juan Panero (April 2, 1908 in Astorga, Spain – August 7, 1937) was a Spanish poet born in Astorga. The brother of Leopoldo Panero, his works are characterized by the use of classical forms and romantic themes. They are both classified as part of the Generation of '36 movement.

Panero studied in San Sebastián and returned to Astorga in 1924 where he founded the literary magazine Saeta with his friends in 1925. Under the pseudonym Juan de Mena, he published the poem A la que más me gusta. With his brother and other friends, he founded the magazine Humo in 1928 and moved to Madrid for university. His only book of poetry, Cantos del Oframiento, was published in 1936. In the same year, Juan and his brother Leopoldo published in the literary magazine Literatura, founded by writers Ricardo Gullón and Manuel Gil.

Panero joined the army in the beginning of the Spanish Civil War. He was killed in a car accident on the way to Astorga on August 7, 1937.

== Poetry ==
His poetic work includes:

- Cantos del Oframiento (Songs of offer) 1936
- Presentimiento de la ausencia (Feeling of absence) 1940 (posthumous)
