= José Herrera Petere =

Spanish writer (1909–1977)

- Born: José Herrera Aguilera; 27 October 1909; Guadalajara, Spain
- Died: 7 February 1977; Geneva
- Occupation: Writer
- Movement: Generation of '36
- Spouse: Carmen Soler Llopis
- Father: Emilio Herrera Linares
- Honours: Concurso Nacional de la Literatura (1938)

José Herrera Aguilera (1909–1977), better known as José Herrera Petere, was a Spanish writer of the Generation of '36. Herrera was known primarily as a poet, writing in both Spanish and French, but he also wrote novels and theatre.

== Biography ==
Herrera was born in Guadalajara, Spain, in 1909. His father was the military engineer and physicist Emilio Herrera Linares. His chosen additional surname, Petere, was a nickname from his childhood. He attended the Colegio del Pilar and later the Central University of Madrid.

At the outbreak of the Spanish Civil War in 1936, Herrera, who was a communist enlisted in the Fifth Regiment to fight against Francisco Franco. As a soldier, he continued to actively write poetry, much of which he published before the war had ended. His novel Acero de Madrid won the 1938 Premio Nacional de la Literatura.

After the defeat of the Second Spanish Republic, Herrera and many other Spanish republicans fled to France and later to Mexico, where he stayed in both the Federal District and Cuernavaca, Morelos. In Mexico he published two volumes of poetry and contributed to a range of publications, including Octavio Paz's literary journal Taller and the daily newspaper El Nacional.

In 1947 Herrera was hired as an editor/translator by the International Labour Organization and moved to Geneva, where in addition to his duties as an international civil servant, he continued to write and publish his literary work.

Herrera died in Geneva in 1977 at the age of 67. In 2010, his and his wife's remains were relocated to his hometown of Guadalajara.
