= Disenchanted =

Disenchanted may refer to:

- Disenchanted (film), the 2022 sequel to Disney's Enchanted
  - Disenchanted (soundtrack), by Alan Menken
- "Disenchanted" (Michael Martin Murphey song), 1984
- "Disenchanted", a 1986 song by the Communards from Communards
- "Disenchanted", a 2001 song by Smash Mouth from Smash Mouth
- "Disenchanted" (My Chemical Romance song), 2006
- "Disenchanted", a 2010 song by Ash from A–Z Series
- Disenchanted, a 2015 album by Handguns

== See also ==
- Disenchantment (disambiguation)
