= Juan Luis Panero =

Spanish poet (1942–2013)

Juan Luis Panero (9 September 1942 – 16 September 2013) was a Spanish poet.

== Early life and education ==
Juan Luis Panero was born in Madrid on 9 September 1942, the son of poet Leopoldo Panero and writer Felicidad Blanc. He was the brother of Leopoldo María Panero, and nephew of Juan Panero.

His family was well-off, and he was educated first in El Escorial, Madrid, and later in London, England.

== Career ==
Panero travelled around different countries in America, which gave him the opportunity to meet renowned writers such as Octavio Paz, Jorge Luis Borges, and Juan Rulfo, among others. He prepared anthologies of poets such as those of his father Leopoldo Panero, Pablo Neruda and Octavio Paz. He made selections of Colombian poetry (1880-1980) and contemporary Mexican poetry.

His own poetic career started in 1968 with the publication of his book A través del tiempo (Through time), followed by Los trucos de la muerte (The tricks of death) in 1975, Desapariciones y fracasos (Disappearances and failures) in 1978 and Juegos para aplazar la muerte (Games to postpone death) in 1984.

Panero's last works were published in 1999: a memoir titled Sin rumbo cierto (Without a certain direction), and Enigmas y despedidas (Enigmas and farewells).

== Awards ==
In 1985 Panero won the Premio Ciudad de Barcelona (City of Barcelona Prize) for Antes que llegue la noche (Before night arrives).

In 1988 he won the Premio Internacional de Poesía de la Fundación Loewe for Galerías y fantasmas (Galleries and ghosts).

In 1999, he won the XII Premio Comillas de Biografía, Autobiografía y Memorias (12th Comillas Prize for Biography, Autobiography and Memoirs) for Sin rumbo cierto.

== Film ==
Panero, his brother Leopoldo María Panero, and his mother Felicidad participated in the 1975 film by Jaime Chávarri, El desencanto (The Disenchantment), about the decline of a family marked by hypocrisy.

== Personal life and death ==
Panero lived in Girona from 1985 onwards. He died on 16 September 2013 in Torroella de Montgrí, in the province of Girona, at the age of 71.
