= Shadow bands =

Optical effect near total solar eclipse

Shadow bands observed during the total solar eclipse of 21 August 2017. The video shows a white sheet (36 x 66 inches, 0.91 x 1.7 meters) laid out on the ground under the sunlight. The shadow bands start faintly, grow dramatically intense as the remaining crescent of sunlight shrinks, and suddenly vanish at the moment of darkness of the total eclipse second contact. The crowd ambiance can be heard on the audio, reacting to the visual spectacle of the shadow bands and eclipse darkness.

Shadowbands

Shadow bands are thin, wavy lines of alternating light and dark that can be seen moving and undulating in parallel on plain-coloured surfaces immediately before and after a total solar eclipse. They are caused by the refraction by Earth's atmospheric turbulence of the solar crescent as it thins to a narrow slit, which increasingly collimates the light reaching Earth in the minutes just before and after totality.

The shadows' detailed structure is due to random patterns of fine air turbulence that refract the collimated sunlight arriving from the narrow eclipse crescent.

The bands' rapid sliding motion is due to shifting air currents combined with the angular motion of the Sun projecting through higher altitudes. The degree of collimation in the light gradually increases as the crescent thins, until the solar disk is completely covered and the eclipse is total.

Stars twinkle for the same reason. All light passing through the Earth's atmosphere encounters tiny disturbances in temperature, pressure, and humidity. These disturbances change the air's refractive index, so that the light essentially passes through innumerable tiny prisms. Thus, the entire sky essentially "dances" randomly at the scale of the disturbances. However, they are so small that even the visible disk of planets (Venus, Jupiter, etc) are larger than the "dancing" scale, and so their brightness appears to remain steady. Only stars are visibly affected, because they are so far away that they are essentially pinpoints of light. This is why astronomers sometimes use the phrase, "stars twinkle, planets don't". Similarly, shadow bands are essentially the "twinkling" of the Sun's thin crescent in the seconds surrounding totality.

== History ==
- In 1820, Hermann Goldschmidt of Germany noted shadow bands visible just before and after totality at some eclipses.
- In 1842, George B. Airy, the English astronomer royal, saw his first total eclipse of the Sun. He recalled shadow bands as one of the highlights: "As the totality approached, a strange fluctuation of light was seen upon the walls and the ground, so striking that in some places children ran after it and tried to catch it with their hands."
- During the eclipses of 1900 and 1905, various amateur balloon experiments were performed to study eclipses. In 1905, Emilio Herrera Linares concluded that the shadow bands were an atmospheric phenomenon.
- In 1905, Catherine Octavia Stevens observed shadow bands at the start of the total eclipse of August 30 at Cas Català, Mallorca. "As to the character of their appearance and mode of progression, it was observed that they swept along with a flight that was at once rapid and orderly, there was no confusion of the wavy lines with one another, but all bore along in one and the same direction in parallel formation, traversing the ground as water-wave reflections may be seen to do on the under surface of a boat, only that there seemed in the case of the shadow-bands to be a more distinct expression of a forward movement." Clouds prevented observations after totality.
- 22 years after observing the same eclipse from Zaragoza, the British amateur astronomer Percy Mayow Ryves wrote in the Monthly Notices of the Royal Astronomical Society that the experience had convinced him 'that the shadow bands were the result of light from a very small source, a small segment of the Sun’s disc, revealing the irregularities of density in the atmosphere, in a manner similar to that in which the irregularities in the glass of a window pane are revealed by the light of the planet Venus.'
- In 2008, British astrophysicist Stuart Eves speculated that shadow bands might be an effect of infrasound, which involves the shadow of the Moon travelling at supersonic speed and inducing an atmospheric shock wave. However, astronomy professor Barrie Jones, an expert on shadow bands, stated, "The [accepted] theory works; there's no need to seek an alternative."
- In 2024, students at the University of Pittsburgh devised an empirical test to collect evidence for both the atmospheric turbulence theory and the moon slit theory. The test of atmospheric turbulence involved using a high-altitude balloon with weather instruments to measure relationships between humidity, temperature, and barometric pressure in the atmosphere and the shadow bands on the ground. The test of the alternative theory involved sending another high-altitude balloon 90,000 feet above Concan, Texas to detect light patterns indicating shadow bands outside of the atmosphere.
