= Wilson MacDonald =

Canadian poet

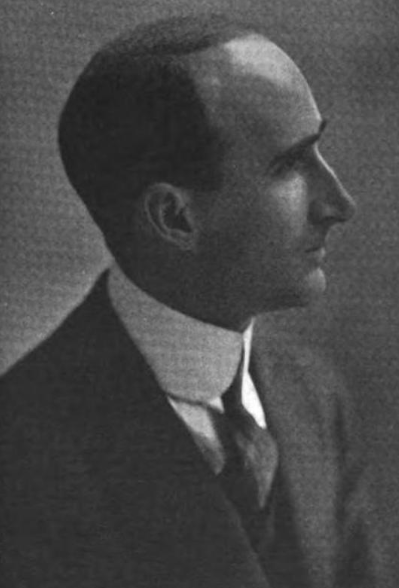
- Born: Wilson Pugsley Macdonald; May 5, 1880; Cheapside, Ontario
- Died: April 8, 1967 (aged 86); Toronto, Ontario
- Occupation: Poet
- Writing career
- Language: English
- Notable work: Out of the Wilderness

Wilson Pugsley MacDonald (May 5, 1880 – April 8, 1967) was a popular Canadian poet who "was known mainly in his own time for his considerable platform abilities" as a reader of his poetry. By reading fees, and by selling his books at readings, he was able to make a living from his poetry alone. In the 1920s he was so popular that, according to writer John Robert Colombo, "his fame eclipsed that of Robert Service and Pauline Johnson."

== Life ==
Wilson MacDonald was born in Cheapside, now part of the city of Haldimand, Ontario. He attended McMaster University in Hamilton, Ontario, and graduated in 1902. He began publishing poetry in the Toronto Globe in 1899, while still a student.

Canadian poet Albert E. S. Smythe described MacDonald as a "slight, lithe, graceful Italian figure, the same dark eyes and olive complexion, the same inscrutable smile of the shy but friendly soul".

After graduating, MacDonald worked at a number of jobs. As he later wrote: "I have been, in my varied career, a view agent, seaman, cabin-boy, bartender (one night), school-teacher, actor, inventor, producer, playwright, composer, advertisement writer, newspaper reporter, editorial writer, columnist, banker, and poet. When my poetry would not sell, circumstances forced these other tasks upon me."

His first collection of poetry, Song of the Prairie Land, was published in 1918. In 1921 MacDonald self-published a book of Christian poetry called The Miracle Songs of Jesus.

Because he refused to be anything but a fully committed poet, now that he had been published, in the early 1920s "MacDonald managed to" find a way to "supplement his income by engaging in lengthy and rather successful tours of readings and lectures". He became what Doug Fetherling in the Canadian Encyclopedia called "a barnstorming versifier with an unbending faith in his own greatness". MacDonald travelled both Canada and the northern United States reciting his poetry in large city and small town alike. "His personal shyness disappeared on stage, where he became dynamic; humming, chanting, and singing, he synchronized his whole performance to make poems come alive for his audience."

MacDonald was not the first Canadian poet to make a living from performance; Pauline Johnson had done so 30 years before. But he is the first noted for merchandising his tours. Fetherling noted, with an apparent shudder, MacDonald's books that "he himself hawked at his 'recitals'". And not just books. MacDonald "was something of an artist, a designer. Frequently he illustrated his own poems and dabbled with illumination and typography." There are many examples online of individual poems illustrated or calligraphed by MacDonald, which look like merchandising aimed at those unwilling or unable to buy a whole book.

Of course, everything bought at a performance could also be autographed; MacDonald, like George Moore before him, or A. Edward Newton, was an author whose books are seldom found unsigned.

MacDonald's most popular work, Out of the Wilderness (1926), went into ten editions.

Critics seldom paid attention to his work, and his work was not taught in schools. MacDonald went around that barrier by reciting his poetry for free in high school auditoriums across Canada, paying for it with his merchandising. "He was the one poet a generation or two of Canadian students had ever seen or heard."

A fan club, the Wilson MacDonald Poetry Society, was active in several cities, including in the United States, "and at least one such group still survives". From 1953 on, when MacDonald was in his 70s and no longer performing, the Poetry Society supported him financially.

He died in Toronto on April 8, 1967.

== Writing ==
In a 1933 talk on "Canadian Poetry in its Relation to The Poetry of England and America", Charles G. D. Roberts singled out MacDonald as one of three postwar poets representative of modern trends. Roberts said of him: "Wilson MacDonald is purely a lyricist, with a very wide range of form and theme. His best work is forged in the white heat of emotion and is always definitely stamped with his own personality. It is primarily subjective. In his shorter, personal lyrics, such as 'Exit,' he achieves at times an unforgettable poignancy. In his passionately humanitarian poems he is modem in spirit, but in form he is distinctly classical." (Italics in original.)

The Encyclopedia of Literature praised technical aspects of MacDonald's poetry "The poems are invariably well balanced because of his musical interest; parts of stanzas are repeated for emphasis and direction — as major melodies in music would be — with other lines juxtaposed to heighten the emotional effect."

Fetherling was frankly dismissive: "It is surprising the extent to which MacDonald was often taken seriously as an artist and equally surprising that genuine poems or hints of them can sometimes be discovered in his collections by those willing to wade through his vapid romanticism and pre-modernist conventions."

Some of MacDonald's poetry certainly does not hold up: for example, the books Caw-Caw Ballads and Paul Marchand and Other Poems, which employ dialect verse – here the French-Canadian habitant dialect of English popularized by William Henry Drummond – more entertaining if heard performed rather than read, and even then more embarrassing than entertaining.

Other pieces of MacDonald's work stand the test of time. The title poem of his collection Out of the Wilderness has something of the strength of Walt Whitman – "I, a vagabond, gypsy, lover forever of freedom, / Come, / Come to you who are arrogant, proud, and fevered with civilization – / Come with a tonic of sunlight, bottled in wild careless acres,/ To cure you with secrets as old as the breathing of men."

Roberts said of that poem that MacDonald "has been so bold as to experiment frankly with Whitman's peculiar form and content, and he has justified the experiment. He has succeeded at times in breathing into that harsh form a beauty of words and cadences which Whitman never achieved".

== Recognition ==
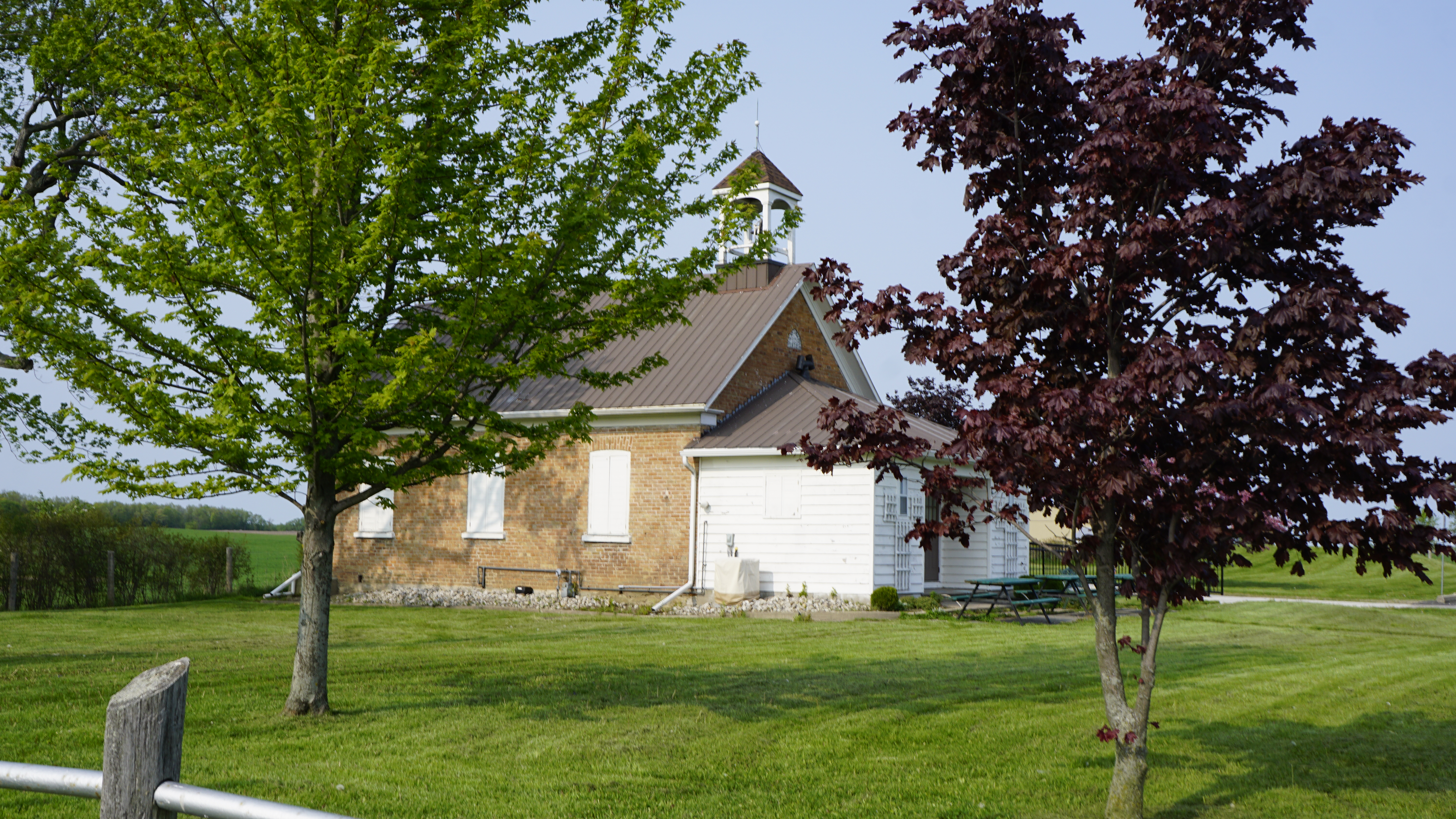
The Wilson Macdonald Memorial School Museum

The Wilson MacDonald Memorial School Museum near Selkirk in Haldimand (one of the schools MacDonald attended as a boy) has been designated a National Historic Site of Canada. Dedicated "to preserving the history of rural education, the heritage of the surrounding community, and the memory of poet Wilson Pugsley MacDonald", the museum "allows students to experience a typical day in a 1925 one-room rural school. Costumes, role playing, lessons and games help modern youngsters learn about their heritage and the history of education. The day-long programme is especially tailored to the school curriculum."

== Publications ==
=== Poetry ===
- The Song Of The Prairie Land and Other Poems. Albert E. S. Smythe intr., Toronto: McClelland & Stewart, 1918.
- The Miracle Songs Of Jesus. Toronto: W. MacDonald, 1921.
- Out Of The Wilderness. Ottawa: Graphic Publishers, 1926. New York, London: C. Scriber's Sons, 1926.
- An Ode On The Diamond Jubilee Of Confederation. Toronto: W. MacDonald, 1927.
- Caw-Caw Ballads Montclair, NJ: Pine Tree Publishing, 1930.
- A Flagon Of Beauty. Toronto: Pine Tree Publishing, 1931.
- Paul Marchand and Other Poems. Guy Ritter illus., Toronto: Pine Tree Publishing, 1933.
- Quintrains Of "Callender" and Other Poems. Toronto: S. J. R. Saunders, 1935.
- The Song Of The Undertow and Other Poems. Toronto, Buffalo: S. J. R. Saunders, Broadway P, 1935.
- Comber Cove. Frank A. Stockwell illus., Toronto: S. J. R. Saunders, 1937.
- Greater Poems Of The Bible: metrical versions, biblical forms, and original poems. 1943.
- Armand Dussault. Toronto: Macmillan, 1946. Buffalo, NY: Broadway P, 1946.
- The Lyric Year. Toronto: Ryerson, 1952. Buffalo, NY: Foster & Stewart, 1952.
- Pugwash. Toronto: Pine Tree Publishing, 1962. "No type is used in this book, It is unique in that it is one of the few books which reproduce the author's own handwriting".

=== Prose ===
- On My Own in Moscow. Toronto: Northern Book House, 1958.
- The Angels Of The Earth. Toronto: Nelson, 1963.

=== Misc. ===
- Wilson MacDonald's Western Tour, 1923–24: a collage of letters (to, from and about Wilson MacDonald), newspaper clippings, poems, drawings and miscellaneous MacDonaldiana assembled by Stan Dragland. Toronto: Coach House, 1975.
