= Ricardo Gullón =

Spanish writer (1908–1991)

The Most Excellent Ricardo Gullón
- Born: Ricardo Gullón Fernández; 30 August 1908; Astorga, Spain
- Died: 11 February 1991 (aged 82); Madrid, Spain

Seat c of the Real Academia Española
- In office 22 October 1990 – 11 February 1991
- Preceded by: Manuel Fernández-Galiano (Note: Fernández-Galiano was elected for the position in 1987 but never took the seat)
- Succeeded by: Víctor García de la Concha

Ricardo Gullón Fernández (30 August 1908 – 11 February 1991) was a Spanish writer, essayist and literary critic. He was born in Astorga, Leon, where he received his primary education. He went to secondary school in France, and studied law at the University of Madrid. He developed a strong friendship with the writer Juan Ramón Jiménez. In 1935, he published his first book Fin de semana. He was imprisoned by the Nationalist forces for collaborating with the republican forces during the Spanish Civil War. He was released with the help of Luis Rosales and Luis Felipe Vivanco. In 1953, he travelled to Puerto Rico to visit his exiled friend Juan Ramón Jiménez and remained there for three years.

He moved to the United States where he taught Spanish literature at several universities including Columbia, Chicago and Texas-Austin. He supervised doctoral theses on the 19th-century Spanish novel and contemporary Spanish poetry, among other literary topics. In the US, he is now regarded as one of the leading Hispanists of the 20th century. He was a recognized authority on the works of Juan Ramón Jiménez, Benito Pérez Galdós, José María de Pereda, Antonio Machado and Miguel de Unamuno. In 1989, he was elected to the Royal Spanish Academy. Also that year, he received the prestigious Prince of Asturias Award for Literature.

He died in Madrid in 1991.
