= Stratonautical space suit =

Pressurized suit

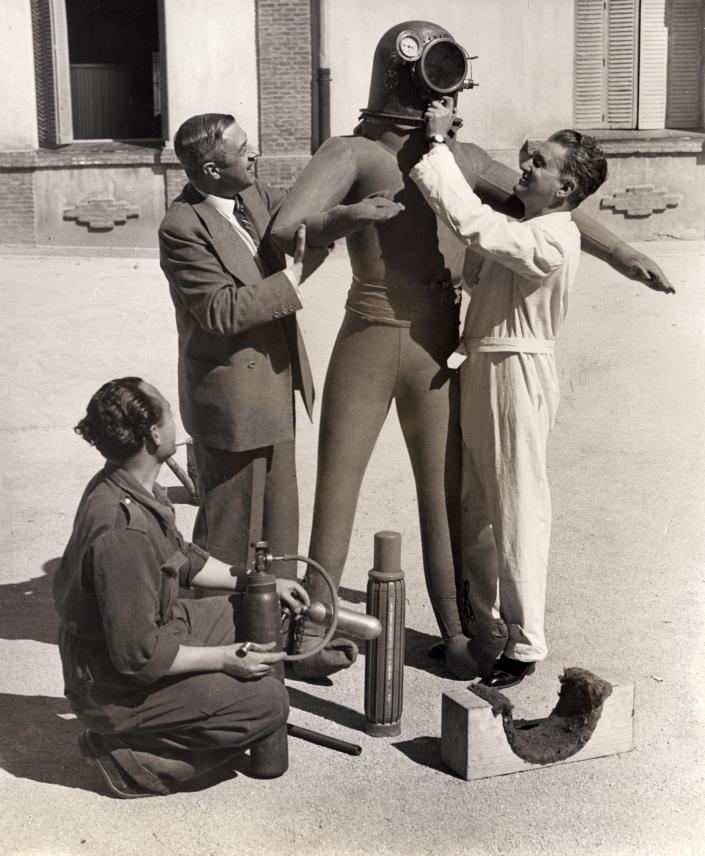
Herrera's pressurised stratonautical space suit prototype, c. 1935

The stratonautical space suit (Spanish: escafandra estratonáutica) was a pressurised suit designed by Colonel Emilio Herrera in 1935 to be worn during a stratospheric flight using an open-basket balloon scheduled for the following year. It is considered one of the antecedents of the space suit.

The flight never took place, due to the start of the Spanish Civil War. Herrera, a supporter of the Republican side, fled in 1939 to France, where he died in exile in 1967. The balloon, made of vulcanized silk, was cut and used to make raincoats for the troops. The suit was in the Cuatro Vientos airbase, fell to the Nationalist side and disappeared. It would have been the first fully pressurized functional suit in history, although it was never worn under real conditions.

The suit had a woolen layer and a hermetic cover on the inside (tested in the bathroom of Herrera's apartment in Seville), covered with an articulated metal frame with accordion-like folds. It had articulated parts for the shoulders, hips, elbows, knees, and fingers. The mobility of the suit was tested at the Cuatro Vientos experimental station, and according to Herrera it was "satisfactory". The suit was supplied with pure oxygen. Herrera designed a special carbon-free microphone to use inside the suit and avoid any possibility of spontaneous ignition. The helmet visor used three layers of glass: one unbreakable, one with an ultraviolet filter, and an opaque infrared exterior. All three layers had an anti-fog treatment.

Herrera included an electric heater in the suit, but during tests in a chamber simulating high altitudes it turned out that the suit was heated to 33 °C (91 °F) while the temperature of the atmosphere around it dropped to −79 °C (−110 °F). Herrera soon realized that the problem with a pressurized suit in a near-vacuum environment was that it actually removed excess heat produced by the human body.

A cloak made of reflective material would protect the stratonaut from solar and cosmic radiation. It is the only extant part of the suit, preserved by family friends from Granada.
