= Germán Bleiberg =

Spanish writer (1915–1990)

Germán Bleiberg Gottlieb (14 March 1915 – 31 October 1990) was a Spanish poet, playwright and translator, notable as part of the Generation of '36.

== Life ==
Born in Madrid, where he also died, he studied at a college in Germany before gaining a license and a doctorate in Philosophy and Letters from the University of Madrid. In 1933 Bleiberg converted to Roman Catholicism from Judaism.During the Spanish Civil War he saw active service on the Republican side, winning the National Theater Prize jointly with Miguel Hernández for a now lost work in 1938. He fled to the United States after the Republicans' final defeat, becoming a professor at Notre Dame University and New York University. His works include the poetry collections "Sonetos amorosos" (1936), "Más allá de las ruinas" (1947), "La mutua primavera" (1948) and "Selección de poemas" (1975). He and Julián Marías produced the noted Diccionario de Literatura Española, republished several times.

== Works ==
=== Poetry ===
- El cantar de la noche. Colección "La tentativa poética", published by Concha Méndez and Manuel Altolaguirre, Madrid, 1935.
- Sonetos amorosos. Ediciones Héroe, Madrid, 1936.
- Más allá de las ruinas. Revista de Occidente, Madrid, 1947.
- La mutua primavera. Colección "Norte", edited by Gabriel Celaya, San Sebastián, 1948.
- El poeta ausente, with illustrations by Gregorio Prieto. Madrid, 1948.
- Selección de poemas (1936-1973). Grant & Cutler, London, 1975.
- Antología poética. Alianza Editorial, Madrid, 1985.

=== Plays ===
- Sombras de héroes. Editorial Signo, Madrid, 1938, in the collection Teatro de Urgencia.
- La huida, unpublished. Le valió el Premio Nacional de Literatura en 1938.
- Amanecer. published by Cuadernos de Madrid, Madrid, 1939.

=== Translations ===
- Novalis, Granos de polen. Himnos a la noche. Enrique de Ofterdingen. México, Conaculta, 1987.
