= Disenchantment: The Guardian and Israel =

2004 book by Daphna Baram

- Author: Daphna Baram
- Language: English
- Subject: Israeli–Palestinian conflict
- Published: London
- Publisher: Guardian Books
- Publication date: 2004, 2008
- Publication place: United Kingdom
- Media type: Print (paperback)
- Pages: 296
- ISBN: 9780852650905
- Dewey Decimal: 956.94

Disenchantment: The Guardian and Israel is a 2004 book by Israeli journalist Daphna Baram. Another edition was released in 2008 with a new foreword by British-Israeli historian and critic of Israel, Avi Shlaim. The work was commissioned by the British newspaper The Guardian in order to address questions about criticism the publication had received over its coverage of the State of Israel.

== Synopsis ==
The book examines the relationship between the liberal British daily newspaper The Guardian and the State of Israel. An early advocate and supporter of Israel, at a time when the conservative elements in the British press were much less supportive of Israel than they would go on to be, the paper has become more strongly critical due to the Israeli–Palestinian conflict, and actions of Israel such as ongoing building of Israeli settlements in the Israeli-occupied West Bank.

== Reception ==
Critical reception has been mixed and the work has been cited as an example of work that examines newspaper coverage of the Middle East and the State of Israel. The New Statesman reviewed the work alongside Greg Philo's Bad News From Israel and stated that Disenchantment was "the more interesting and readable" of the two. The Economist also reviewed the work, writing "Over the decades, some Guardian commentators and reporters have been excessively partisan--and a few, from each side, have left or been eased out because of this. Far from glossing over such issues, Ms Baram lays bare the paper's internal quarrels. Indeed, this is the best part of her book".

In contrast, the Jewish Quarterly and The Jerusalem Post both criticised the work, both questioning Baram's qualifications to impartially investigate and cover the issue. Norman Lebrecht also commented on the work, writing that Baram "exonerates the paper of anti-Zionism and anti-Semitism, but many in the Middle East will feel distinctly queasy at The Guardian's unremitting self-importance."

Bryan Cheyette, a reviewer for The Guardian reviewed the book and while he did praise the "detailed interviews with most of the key Guardian players in relation to Israel since the 1970s" he also criticised Baram as having "something of a tin ear when it comes to the experiences of Jews as a minority in the diaspora."
