= Tardelcuende =

- Municipality
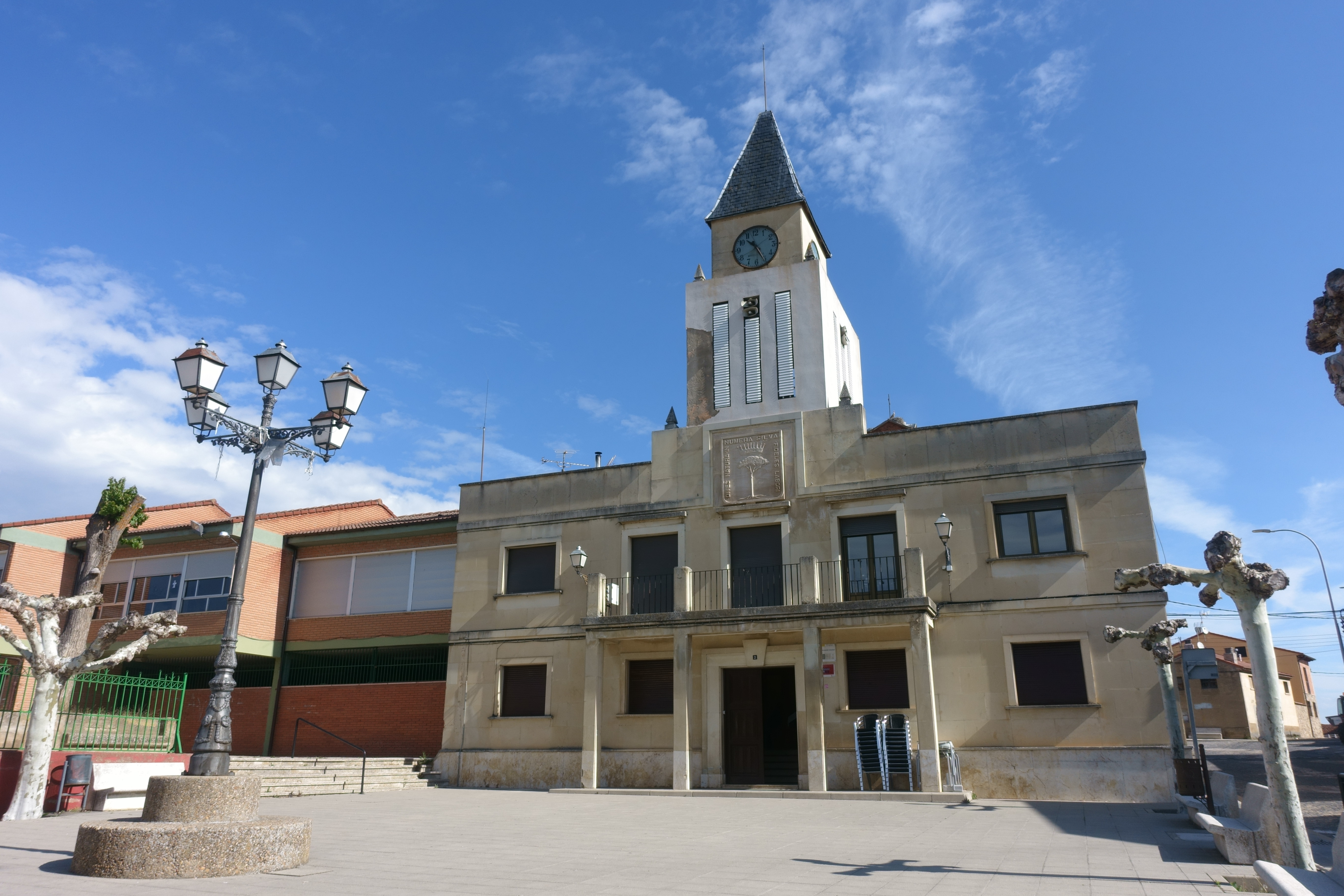
- Tardelcuende Town Hall

- Coat of arms

- Location in Spain. Tardelcuende (Spain)
- Coordinates: 41°35′37″N 2°38′40″W
- Country: Spain
- Autonomous community: Castile and León
- Province: Soria
- Municipality: Tardelcuende

Area
  - Total: 63 km^{2} (24 sq mi)
- Elevation: 990 m (3,250 ft)

Population (2025-01-01)
  - Total: 414
  - Density: 6.6/km^{2} (17/sq mi)
- Time zone: UTC+1 (CET)
  - Summer (DST): UTC+2 (CEST)
- Website: Official website

Tardelcuende is a municipality located in the province of Soria, Castile and León, Spain. According to the 2004 census (INE), the municipality has a population of 606 inhabitants.
