= No Thanks (poetry collection) =

1935 collection of poetry

First edition (publ. Golden Eagle Press)

No Thanks is a 1935 collection of poetry by E. E. Cummings. He self-published the collection with the help of his mother and dedicated it to the fourteen publishing houses who turned the collection down. The first edition is unconventionally bound not on the left but rather the top, like a stenographer's pad.

== Reprint ==
A reprint was published in 1998 and was edited by George James Firmage, who is known for editing many of Cummings' other works. Liveright described the book as:

No Thanks was first published in 1935; although Cummings was by then in mid-career, he had still not achieved recognition, and the title refers ironically to publishers' rejections. No Thanks contains some of Cummings's most daring literary experiments, and it represents most fully his view of life—romantic individualism. The poems celebrate an openly felt response to the beauties of the natural world, and they give first place to love, especially sexual love, in all its manifestations.

— https://www.google.com/books/edition/No_Thanks/4dZ6AAAAQBAJ?hl=en&gbpv=0
