= Panera =

Panera may refer to:

- Panera Bread, American chain of bakery-café fast casual restaurants
- Lander Panera, Spanish professional footballer

== See also ==
- Pane (disambiguation)
- Panerai
- Panero
