= Emilio Herrera Linares =

Spanish engineer and politician

Emilio Herrera
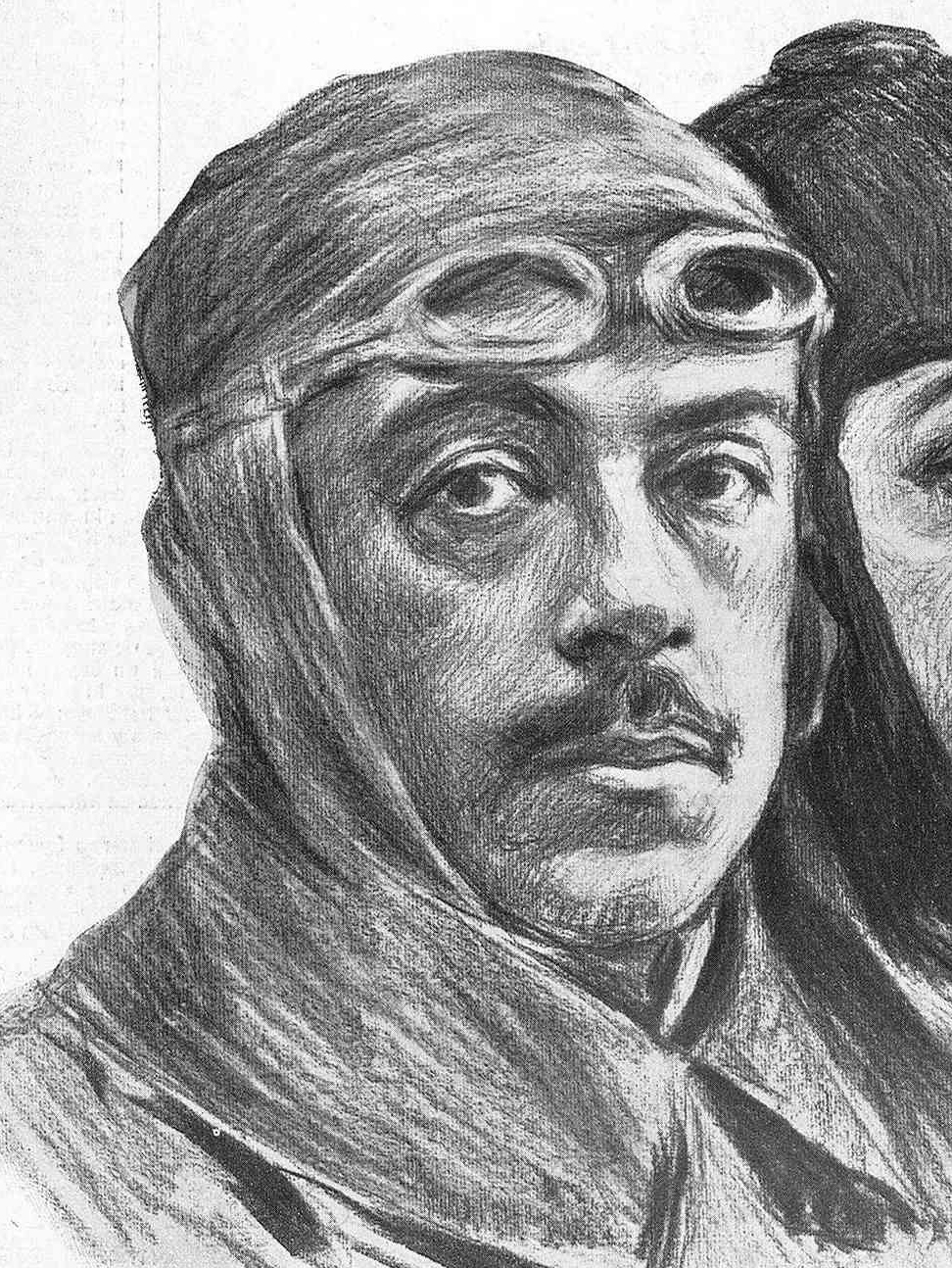
- Born: Emilio Herrera Linares; 13 February 1879; Granada, Spain
- Died: 13 September 1967 (aged 88); Geneve, Switzerland
- Children: José Herrera Petere

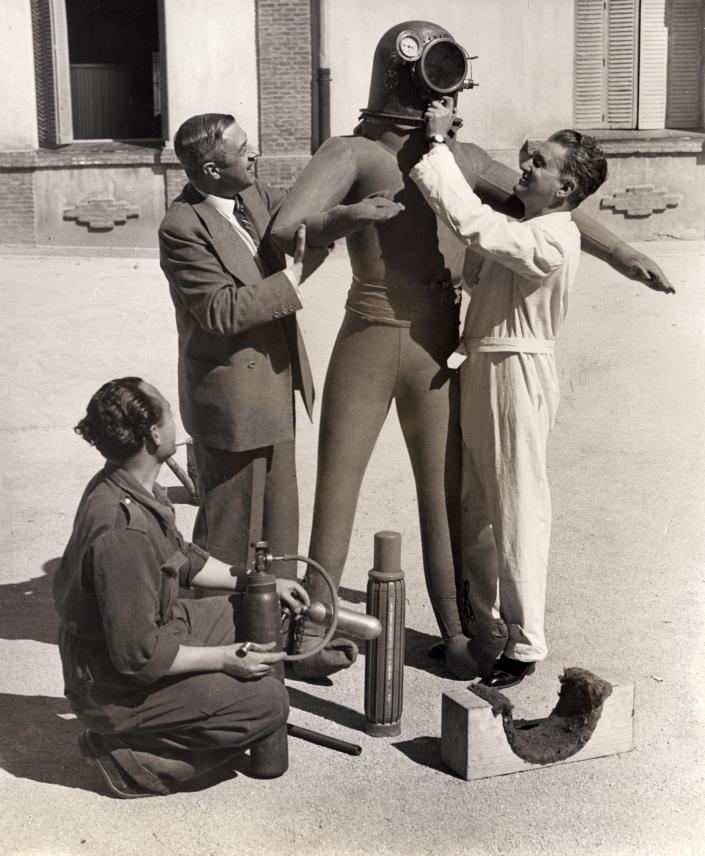
Stratospheric space suit prototype, designed by Herrera for stratospheric flight c. 1935

Emilio Herrera Linares (13 February 1879, in Granada, Spain – 13 September 1967, in Geneve, Switzerland) was a Spanish military engineer and physicist.

== Biography ==
He was born in Granada, 1879 and became interested in the military from a young age. His father served in the military as well as attended science fairs and conventions, this would lead to his interest in military science. He graduated from the Academy of Military Engineering of Guadalajara in 1902; he subsequently researched aeronautics, including a brief period at the University of Santander. He is best known for his work in cosmology and pioneering studies for high-altitude flight, spaceflight, computing, and for designing the pressurised stratonautical space suit that was to be used in a planned stratospheric balloon flight in 1936 and that is considered one of the antecedents of the space suit.

During the Solar eclipse of August 30, 1905, he used an aerostatic balloon to study the phenomenon of shadow bands that are produced during the eclipse. He concluded that the bands were an atmospheric phenomenon.

During the Spanish Civil War (1936–1939), he remained loyal to the Second Spanish Republic. In 1937, he was made a general. He was a minister in several Spanish Republican government in exile and Prime Minister of the Republic in exile between 1960 and 1962. He was father of the poet José Herrera Petere.

== Works ==
- Herrera, Emilio (1984). Flying : the memoirs of a Spanish aeronaut. Albuquerque: University of New Mexico Press. ISBN 9780826307521.

== In Fiction ==
In 2020 he was played by actor Vicente Romero in the Spanish series El ministerio del tiempo.
