= Luis Rosales =

Spanish writer (1910–1992)

The Most Excellent Luis Rosales
- Born: Luis Rosales Camacho; 31 May 1910; Granada, Spain
- Died: 24 October 1992 (aged 82); Madrid, Spain
- Occupation: Writer
- Spouse: María Fouz
- Children: Luis Rosales Fouz
- Writing career
- Language: Spanish
- Period: 20th century
- Genres: poetry, essay, journalism
- Notable work: La Casa Encendida, Abril, Diario de una Resurrección, Rimas, Cervantes y la Libertad
- Literary movement: Generation of '36

Seat C of the Real Academia Española
- In office 19 April 1964 – 24 October 1992
- Preceded by: Ramón Pérez de Ayala (Note: Pérez de Ayala was elected for the position in 1928 but never took the seat)
- Succeeded by: Luis Goytisolo

Luis Rosales Camacho (31 May 1910 – 24 October 1992) was a Spanish poet and essay writer member of the Generation of '36.

He was born in Granada (Spain). He became a member of the Hispanic Society of America and the Royal Spanish Academy in 1962. Rosales obtained the Miguel de Cervantes Prize in 1982 for his literary work. He died in Madrid in 1992, aged 82.

== Biography ==
He was born in Granada in 1910, into a very conservative family. His beginnings in literary training are related to the environment of artists from the Gallo magazine (although he never published in it), whose members —Enrique Gómez Arboleya, Manuel López Banús, Joaquín Amigo and Federico García Lorca, among others—, will become his great friends. In 1930, after a couple of publications in the avant-garde magazine Granada Gráfica, he made his first poetic reading at the Granada Artistic, Literary and Scientific Center, which was considered a success - the Granada press echoed, and since then his interventions in this institution were numerous—; months later, he began his studies in Philosophy and Law at the University of Granada.

In 1932, he moved to Madrid to continue his studies in Philology, obtaining a doctorate. There he began his friendship with Pedro Salinas and Jorge Guillén, who introduced him to Los Cuatro Vientos, considered the last collective magazine of the group of poets of the Generation of '27. In the second number of said magazine, in April 1933, they collaborate the great intellectuals of the time such as Miguel de Unamuno, Benjamín Jarnés, Manuel Altolaguirre, María Zambrano, Luis Felipe Vivanco, Leopoldo Vivanco, Claudio de la Torre, Vicente Aleixandre, Antonio Marichalar, Jaime Torres Bodet and Rainer María Rilke; and Rosales himself publishes his first poems: Eclogue of sleep and Ode of anxiety.

He continued his literary activity in Cruz y Raya, a magazine directed by José Bergamín. He also publishes his verses in Vértice and Caballo Verde para la Poesía, a magazine directed by Pablo Neruda in which poems by other writers such as Vicente Aleixandre or Miguel Hernández also appeared. In the capital of Spain he met the Panero (Juan and Leopoldo) and Luis Felipe Vivanco, companions of what will later be called Generation of 36 (or of the War), of which Dionisio Ridruejo is also a part, and whose common axes, In addition to his affinity and camaraderie, were his intimate Catholicism and his social conservatism.

In August 1936, at the start of the Spanish Civil War, Ramón Ruiz Alonso, who was a member of the CEDA, arrested Federico García Lorca. The poet had taken refuge in the Rosales house, thus believing that he was safe from reprisals, since there were prominent Falangist members in that family. Luis Rosales could not avoid his arrest and subsequent execution despite the friendship he had with Lorca and his position within the Granada right wing. In that same fateful year, Joaquín Amigo, professor of philosophy and member of the intellectuals who created Gallo magazine and very close to both, was also assassinated. In this case, Joaquín Amigo was assassinated by the Republicans, throwing him down the Tajo de Ronda, while he was stationed in that Malaga town as a high school professor. These two deaths mark the life, both personal and literary, of Rosales, in whose work —both in A face in each wave and in his unfinished New York after death, and in many other writings, both poetic and essays— are reflected the influences of both friends.

In 1937 he published in the newspaper Patria de Granada, the poem «The voice of the dead», probably one of the most important written during the civil war, it chose all the victims of both sides, in which any expression of triumphalism is excluded or exaltation. From that same year Rosales collaborated in the Falangist magazine Jerarquía.

He also collaborated in the newspaper Arriba España and in the Escorial magazine. He was editorial secretary and director of Cuadernos Hispanoamericanos. Starting in 1978, he directed Nueva Estafeta, the only magazine of its time because it included among its collaborations works written in the different languages of Spain (Spanish, Catalan, Basque or Galician). Ideologically, he evolved from the authoritarian ideas of his youth to democratic positions in his maturity.

Pablo Neruda said of him:

What to say about Luis Rosales, whom I met with an orange tree, recently in bloom in those thirties, and who is now a serious poet, an exact definer, a lord of languages? Now we have it full of fruit, demanding and deep. This anti-political mortal went through the heartbreaking moment of Andalusia and has recovered in silence and in word. Cheers, good mate!

At the end of 1949 and the beginning of 1950, he participated in the "poetic mission" with the poets Antonio Zubiaurre, Leopoldo Panero and the ambassador Agustín de Foxá, who toured different Hispanic American countries (among others Honduras) prior to the reestablishment of diplomatic relations between these countries and the Franco regime.

In 1962, he joined the Hispanic Society of America and the Royal Spanish Academy, although he did not read his entrance speech, Pasión y muerte del Conde de Villamediana, until 1964.

He was an active member of the Privy Council of the Count of Barcelona, encouraging the left and right to join and support the restoration of the monarchy in Spain (first with the aforementioned, and later with Juan Carlos de Borbón).

Although he had lived in Madrid since 1968, he spent summers in Cercedilla, a time when he wrote his poetry books. In 1982, he received the Cervantes Prize, the most important literary award in the Spanish language.

In 1970, he was appointed advisor to the director of the Institute of Hispanic Culture and, in 1973, director of the Department of Cultural Activities of said Institute.

Between 1986 and 1992 he collaborated periodically with the newspaper ABC, either writing in a column or publishing in the weekly supplement Blanco y Negro. The subjects of the writings in this medium were mainly music, painting, and literature. His contributions included "The originality of the second part of Don Quixote", "A model of theater", "History of a sonnet" (written in different parts), "The book of sparrows", "Rafael Alberti or freedom poetics "," The temporality of Antonio Machado "," The hour of cubism "," Creative contemplation "(about Picasso) and" The wound of cante jondo ", among many others.

On October 28, 1988, in the Hall of Mirrors of the Malaga City Council, he gave the lecture «And suddenly, Picasso».

He died at the age of 82 on October 24, 1992 in the old Puerta de Hierro clinic in Madrid after suffering a cerebral embolism.

== Work ==
Abril (1935), published immediately before the outbreak of the Spanish Civil War, connects with the style of poetry of the previous generation due to its aesthetic search and the importance of images, although without avant-garde pretensions. Like some poets from '27, there is in this youth work a taste for classical stanzas and, in general, for poetry from the Golden Age, specifically Garcilaso and Herrera. However, its main innovation is the combination of the love-religious theme.

His next work, The best queen of Spain. Figuration in prose and verse (1939), written in collaboration with L.F. Vivanco, is an essay with a theme very typical of the time, imbued by the Falangist ideology and recalling past glories. In 1941, the content of the heart appeared, with a classic and loving tone.

In 1949, he published the first version of La casa encendida, considered by critics his best work. The book was remade and expanded until a new version was produced, published in 1967. Something similar happened with his first work, Abril, which was corrected and augmented with new poems and published again in 1972 with the title Segundo Abril, almost 40 years after its first edition. La casa encendida is a book-poem –written in free verse without stanzas– where Rosales mixes lyricism and narration, existentialism and imagination, rationality and irrationality, starting a new personal poetics that incorporates resources from César Vallejo and Antonio Machado.

Between 1937 and 1951, she worked on the book Rimas (1951), where she explored with the short poem, demonstrating her great versatility and technical mastery. Her essays include Cervantes y la libertad (1960) and Pasión y muerte del Conde de Villamediana (1962). Her latest works, more autobiographical and disillusioned, maintain the union of the lyrical and the narrative, with surrealist findings already present in La casa encendida.

In 1966, he published The Feeling of Disappointment in Baroque Poetry, and three years later The Content of the Heart, for which in 1970 he obtained the Critics' Prize. In 1972, he published Theory of Freedom and Spanish Lyric, whose essay Garcilaso, Camoens and the Spanish Lyric of the Golden Age obtained the Miguel de Unamuno Prize.10 In 1973 the Great Illustrated Encyclopedic Dictionary of the Reader's Digest was published in eight volumes, whose group of Spanish collaborators directed and that had a second later edition in twelve volumes.

Editorial Trotta has published his Complete Work in six volumes, and Félix Grande, who was a disciple and friend of Rosales, prepared the anthology Because death does not interrupt anything, with his selection and prologue, which appeared in the Biblioteca Sibila in 2010. Grande He also wrote the essay La calumnia. On how Luis Rosales, for defending Federico García Lorca, was persecuted to death (Mondadori, 1987) With the Luis García Montero Edition, the Visor de Poesía Collection publishes El naufrago metódico, Antología, Madrid, 2005.

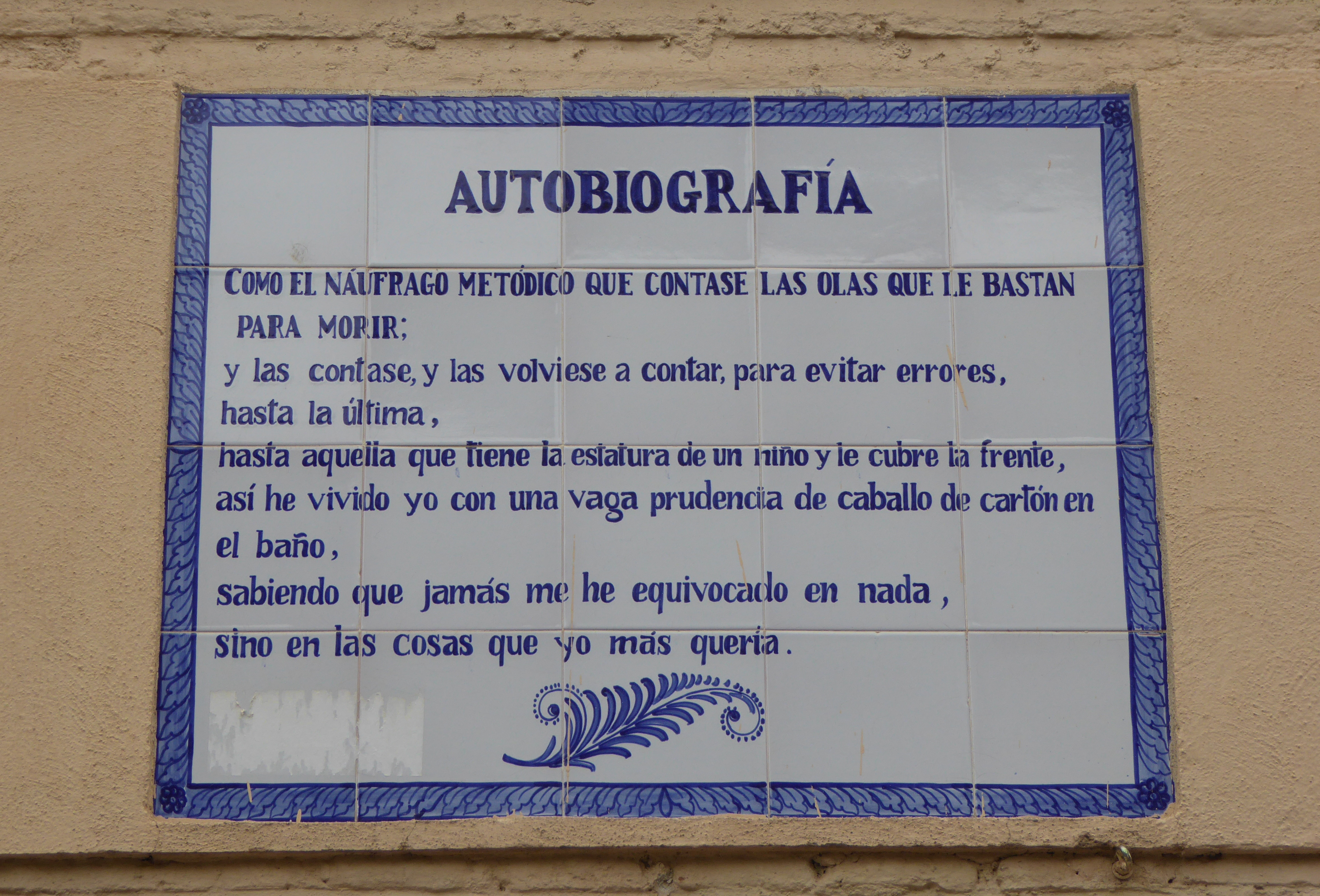
Poem: Autobiografía, in Rimas, 1951. Like the methodical castaway who counts the waves that are missing before dying, and counts them, and counts them again, to avoid mistakes, until the last one, until the one that is the height of a child and kisses him and covers his forehead, so I have lived with the vague prudence of a cardboard horse in the bathroom, knowing that I have never been wrong about anything, except in the things that I loved the most.

== Poetic style ==
The work of Luis Rosales, which covers the entire postwar historical period, evolved from a classicism to a style of its own close to the surrealist avant-garde. Two stages are usually distinguished in his work, one more concerned with aesthetic issues, close to Garcilasista classicism, and a later one of avant-garde experimentation. Both merge in La casa encendida, where aesthetics are no longer a concern, but the exercise of techniques that he already masters.

Broadly speaking, Rosales's literary style is characterized by:

- Mastery of poetic technique.
- The construction of the poem under presuppositions of spiritual and sentimental simplicity.
- Mastery and ease of use of rhymed or free verse, as appropriate to the tone of the poem or the subject matter.
- The absence of adjectives, highlighting the substance of things.

Regarding content, Rosales's poetry has been spoken of as the "poetry of the everyday." Love appears in all his work in a calm way, as well as memory and recollection. The postwar period is also characterized by religious sentiment.

== Literary awards ==
- National Poetry Prize 1951
- Mariano de Cavia Award 1962
- Critics Award 1970 for The Content of the Heart
- Miguel de Unamuno Award 1972
- National Essay Award 1973
- José Lacalle Award 1975
- City of Melilla International Poetry Prize 1981
- Fray Luis de León-Ciudad de Salamanca 1982 Chair of Poetry Award
- Miguel de Cervantes Prize 1982
- Medal of honor from the Rodríguez Acosta Foundation (1986)

== Complete literary work ==
Editorial Trotta published his Complete Works (Obra Completa):

1. Poesía ISBN 978-84-8164-113-4
2. Cervantes y la libertad ISBN 978-84-8164-131-8
3. Estudios sobre el Barroco ISBN 978-84-8164-153-0
4. Ensayos de filosofía y literatura ISBN 978-84-8164-206-3
5. La obra poética del conde de Salinas ISBN 978-84-8164-236-0
6. La mirada creadora. Pintura, música y otros temas ISBN 978-84-8164-274-2
