= Leopoldo María Panero =

Spanish poet (1948–2014)

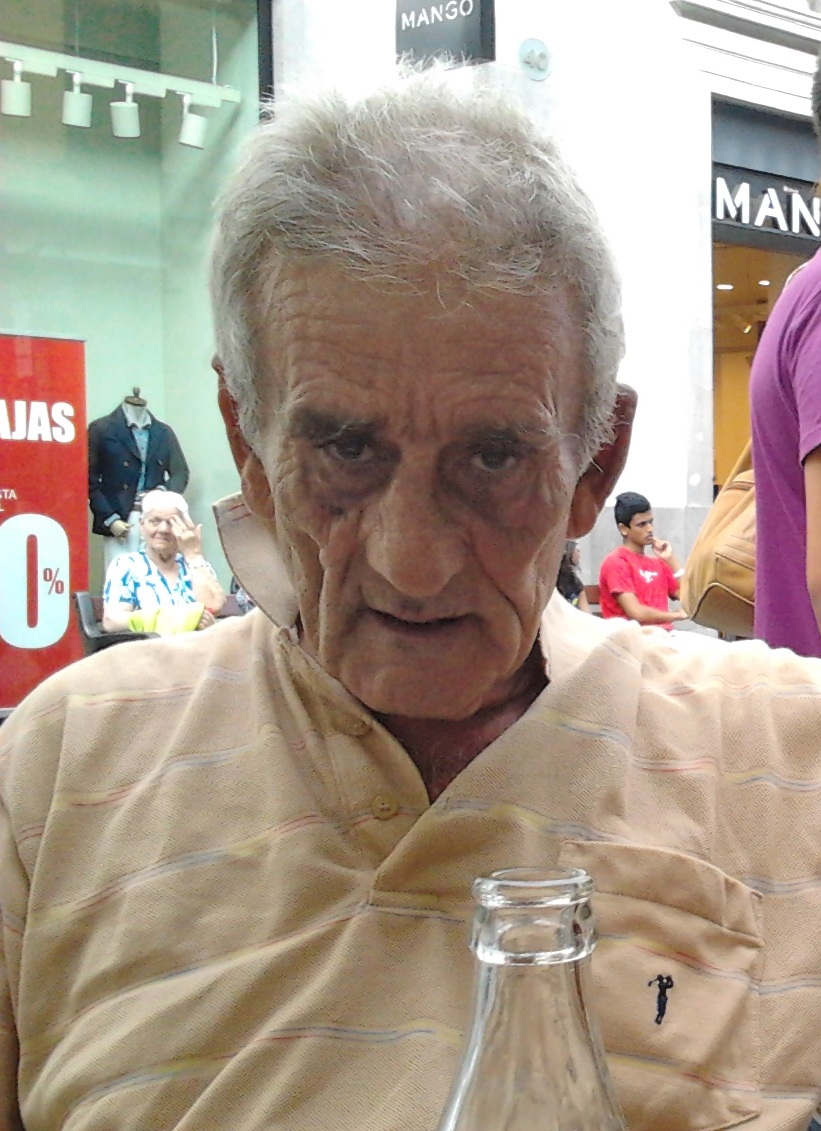
- Panero in 2013
- Born: June 16, 1948; Madrid, Spain
- Died: March 5, 2014 (aged 65); Las Palmas, Gran Canaria

Leopoldo María Panero (16 June 1948 – 5 March 2014) was a Spanish poet and member of the Novísimos group. His work is included in many works of literary history, anthologies, and academic programs across Spain. Much of his work is considered autobiographical.

== Life ==
Panero was born in Madrid to poet Leopoldo Panero and Felicidad Blanc. He is the brother of poet Juan Luis Panero and Michi Panero. From a young age, he was involved in anti-Francoist movements. At the age of 16 he joined the Communist Party of Spain. Panero spent time in prison for his involvement with the communist party. During this period, he began using alcohol and heroin. He would attempt suicide several times while in prison.

Panero studied Philosophy at the Complutense University of Madrid and French Philology at the University of Barcelona.

He was first admitted to a psychiatric hospital in the 70s and was later permanently admitted to the Psychiatric Hospital of St. Agatha in Mondragón.

He died on March 5, 2014, at the age of 65.
