= Luis Felipe Vivanco =

Spanish architect and poet (1907–1975)

Luis Felipe Vivanco (22 August 1907 in San Lorenzo de El Escorial – 21 November 1975 in Madrid) was a Spanish architect and poet.

== Works ==
- Cantos de primavera (1936)
- Tiempo de dolor (1940)
- Continuación de la vida (1949)
- Introducción a la poesía española contemporánea (1957)
- El descampado (1957)
- Memoria de la plata (1958)
- Lecciones para el hijo (1966)
- Moratín y la ilustración mágica (1972)
- Prosas propicias (1972)
