= Leopoldo Panero =

Spanish poet

- Born: 17 October 1909; Astorga, León, Castile and León, Spain
- Died: 27 August 1962 (aged 52); Castrillo de las Piedras, León, Spain
- Education: University of Valladolid
- Occupations: Poet and writer
- Spouse: Felicidad Blanc
- Children: Leopoldo María Panero; Juan Luis Panero; Michi Panero
- Writing career
- Genre: Poetry
- Notable awards: Fastenrath Prize
- Literary movement: Generation of '36

Leopoldo Panero was Spanish poet, born in Astorga in 1909 and deceased in 1962. He was the father of the poets Leopoldo María Panero and Juan Luis Panero and the brother of the early-died poet Juan Panero.

== Biography ==
Panero spent his childhood in Astorga. He did secondary schooling in San Sebastián and León, studied law in the University of Valladolid, and completed his legal studies in Madrid. His first verses of poetry became known in a journal called Nueva Revista in Madrid, which he founded and where he published his works Crónica cuando amanece (1929) and Poema de la niebla (1930). In the fall of 1929 he fell ill of tuberculosis and spent eight months recovering in Guadarrama. There he fell in love with a fellow patient, Joaquina Márquez, who died in the following months, who he referred to in one of his poems. He continued his studies in Cambridge University (1932 to 1934) and in Tours and Poitiers (1935), and he grew to love English and French literature. He also published some of his works in Caballo Verde para la poesía, a journal directed by Pablo Neruda.

During the Civil War, Panero was arrested, taken to San Marcos de León, and accused of collecting funds for the International Red Aid; but through the mediation of his mother, along with Miguel de Unamuno and Carmen Polo, the wife of Francisco Franco- Panero's mother's cousin-, he was able to avoid legal penalties and returned to Astorga in November. In 1937, his brother Juan, who was also a poet, died in a car accident. Following this incident, which had a profound impact on Panero, he began to shift more toward conservatism. Panero wrote Adolescente en Sombra (1938) about the incident and in memory of his brother. In 1941, Panero married Felicidad Blanc, who was also a writer. They had three children together: Juan Luis (1942-2013) and Leopoldo María (1948-2014), who also became poets, and José Moisés "Michi" (1951-2004). During the war, Panero joined the Falange Española de las JONS (Spanish Phalanx of the Councils of the National-Syndicalist Offensive), and was later named cultural attaché to the Spanish embassy (1939), and director of the Spanish Institute in London (1945-1947). There he met and associated with some of the greatly regarded outcasts from the war, such as Luis Cernuda and Esteban Salazar Chapela.

== Selected bibliography ==
- La estancia vacía (Empty existence) 1944
- Escrito a cada instante (Written/Writing to every instant) ISBN 978-84-7033-060-5
- Canto personal (Personal song) 1953. In answer to Pablo Neruda's "Canto General" (General Song)
- Poesía (Poetry) 1963
- Obras completas (Complete works) 1973.
