= Art and culture in Francoist Spain =

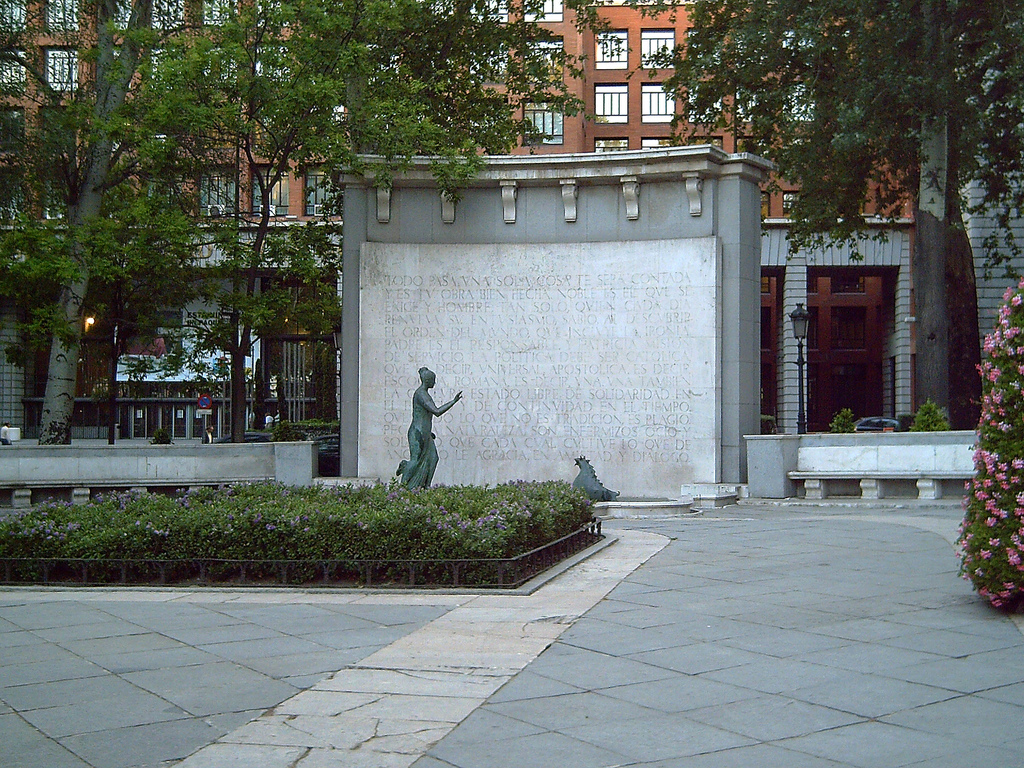
Monument to Eugenio d'Ors in Paseo del Prado in Madrid, opposite the Museo del Prado. In the background is the Casa Sindical or Edificio de los Sindicatos (Ministry of Health). Designed by architect Víctor D’Ors (son of Eugenio d'Ors), sculptures by Cristino Mallo and Frederic Marès, 1963.

You have to impose, in short, the order of culture, the essential ideas that have inspired our glorious movement, which combine the purest lessons of universal and Catholic tradition with the demands of modernity

— Law of November 24, 1939, for the founding of CSIC

Art and culture in Francoist Spain is a historiographic term, with little use beyond the chronological placement of artists and cultural events, or political identification. The term is used generically, without involving ideological or aesthetic evaluation of the entire art and culture of Francoist Spain (1939–1975), which would only be suitable for art and culture more identified with the Franco regime, where other expressions are sometimes used: 'Fascist art and culture in Spain', 'Falangist art and culture', or 'nationalist-catholic (nacional-católica) art and culture', and so forth. The terms 'Spanish Fascist art', 'Fascist Spanish painting', 'Spanish fascist sculpture', 'Spanish fascist architecture', 'Spanish fascist culture', 'Spanish fascist literature', and so on, are infrequently used, but there are examples, as in the writing of Spanish historian Julio Rodriguez-Puértolas. Such terms have a wide application, which can be restricted to cultural products more identified with Spanish Falangism and the azul (blue) familias del franquismo (organizations affiliated with Francoism), although very often these more specific terms are generalized, to cover all of the art identified as "nacional" ('national') in Francoist Spain.

== Internal and external exile ==
Artists active in Francoist Spain include the writers José María Pemán, Agustín de Foxá and Luis Rosales, the painters Carlos Sáenz de Tejada and Fernando Álvarez de Sotomayor, architect and sculptors of the Valle de los Caídos, and the music of Concierto de Aranjuez, Quintero, León y Quiroga, the films of José Luis Sáenz de Heredia and Luis Lucia Mingarro. Prominent cultural figures included the psychiatrists Antonio Vallejo-Nájera and López Ibor, as well as the social scientists Melchor Fernández Almagro, Ramón Carande and Luis Suárez Fernández).

A lot of the Spanish artistic and cultural production of the time was made by authors ideologically opposed or indifferent, or who had aesthetic criteria completely unrelated to a Fascist aesthetic: writers Carmen Laforet, Antonio Buero Vallejo, Vicente Aleixandre; visual artists Dalí, Joan Miró, Antoni Tàpies; sculptors Paul Serrano, Eduardo Chillida, Jorge Oteiza; architects Saenz de Oiza, Miguel Fisac; composers Carmelo Bernaola, Luis de Paul; filmmakers Luis García Berlanga, Juan Antonio Bardem, Carlos Saura; and researchers in natural sciences such as Large Covián, Michael Sanudo Catalan, George Francis Taylor, Antonio de Zulueta, and social scientists such as Jaume Vicens Vives, José Antonio Maravall, Antonio Domínguez Ortiz, Julio Caro Baroja, José Luis Sampedro, Fabian Estapé, Juan José Linz. Some of these artistic and cultural figures were situated more or less precisely in the so-called internal exile. The list of those belonging to this category is not easy to determine. The literature often refers to Vicente Aleixandre and Dámaso Alonso, but in the case of Alonso, 'internal exile' can only be attributed to the period prior to integration in institutions (Royal Academy). Also frequently included are Juan Gil Albert and Rafael Cansinos-Asséns among the literati, and Joan Miró among the visual artists. The Epistolario del exilio (Letters from Exile) of Max Aub, referring to internal exile, collects the letters of Gabriel Celaya, Luis Landinez, Gloria Fuertes, Aleixandre, José Agustín Goytisolo and Luis Goytisolo, Gil Albert, Jose Luis Lopez Aranguren, José Carlos Mainer, Roman Gubern, Ana María Matute, and others. Others included as internal exiles may be Blas de Otero, José Hierro, Eugenio de Nora, and José Ángel Valente.

Jorge Tello Francisco, Antonio de Zulueta and Miguel Catalan Sañudo survived in internal exile, but in a significantly reduced capacity for scientific work due to the hostility of the new authorities, the lack of communication with the outside world, and the postwar economic hardships.(José Manuel Sánchez Ron, Un siglo de ciencia en España, Residencia de Estudiantes, ISBN 84-95078-88-0). Many artistic and cultural figures, whether or not from the beginning, eventually reaching a high social and even official recognition, as the regime struggled to maintain an inclusive attitude towards cultural products that were not identified as a direct challenge by the opposition to Franco (especially after the appointment of Joaquín Ruiz-Giménez as education minister, replacing José Ibáñez Martín in 1951).

Spanish art forms not only developed in the interior of Spain, but outside it, given the extraordinary cultural power of the Spanish Republican exiles, to which belonged figures of the stature of Juan Ramón Jiménez, Pablo Picasso, Julio González, Pablo Casals, Luis Buñuel, the architects of GATEPAC, José Ferrater Mora, Zambrano, Américo Castro, Claudio Sánchez-Albornoz, Juan Negrín Blas Cabrera, and many others.

A leading Falangist, Ernesto Giménez Caballero, was the main theorist of the art of Francoist Spain. In 1934, after attending a conference in Italy, Ernesto Giménez Caballero had been published in an F. E. magazine article, Art and State, which became a book in 1935. Caballero identified the Monastery of El Escorial as "the epitome of all the virtues of Spanish art" and a "symbol of what art should be fascist", while the most prestigious Spanish art theorist of the time, Eugenio d'Ors, strove to create an artistic environment related to the regime but open and assimilative (Salón de los Once, Academia Breve de Crítica de Arte, 1941-1954)), including the avant garde, which increased over time to even be a hallmark of the regime, increasingly interested in showing, both internally and externally, a contemporary image.

Artists and writers related to Franco have suffered from a general underestimation by historians, art critics and literary critics. As Andres Trapiello stated, Francoists "won the war and lost the history of literature".

== Repression and ideological control ==
In accordance with the ideas advanced by influential Spanish scholar and historian Marcelino Menéndez Pelayo (identification with Catholic Spain and opposition to "anti-Spanish sentiment," coming from outside or inside), the government intended to create a new cultural and educational initiative in 1939, which would focus on Spanish nationalism and nacionalcatolicismo religion. The Franco regime failed to impose as intended a totalitarian culture consistent with other exclusionary cultural, and historical sources often termed "traditionalist," "authoritarian" and "dictatorial". This meant, especially during the years immediately after the Spanish Civil War, a culture of imposition, reconquest attitudes, or imperialism.

=== Schools and universities ===
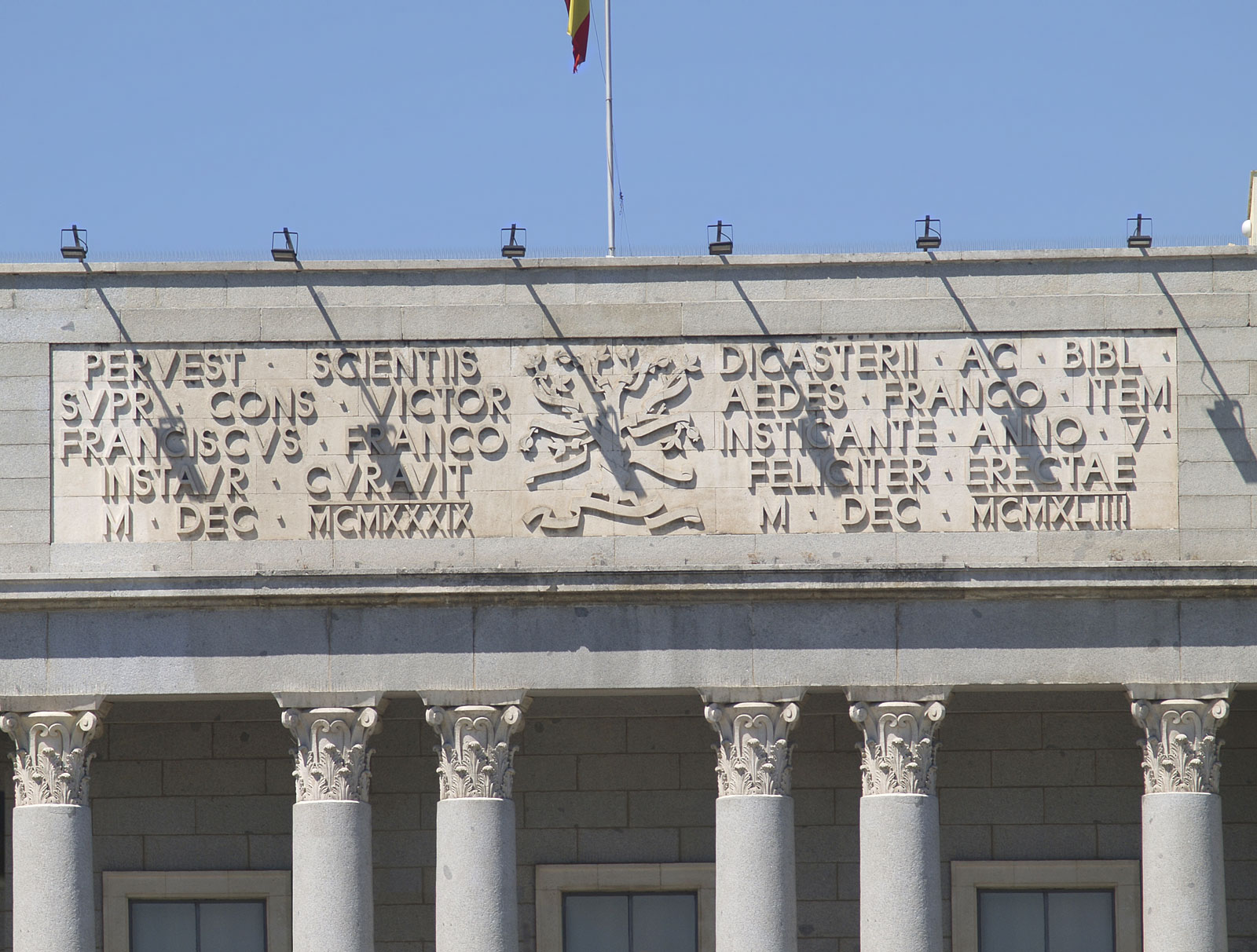
Frieze with Latin inscriptions and emblem of the CSIC, Madrid, 1939. (The inscription, glorifying Francisco Franco, was removed in August 2010. The disciplines or names that should appear in the branches of the tree are also considered controversial: in the Francoist version, Franco gave prominence to theology, from which other sciences are "slaves" according to the scholastic aphorism philosophia ancilla theologiae. The frieze here, and the magazine Arbor during the 1950s used a logo without inscriptions on the branches, and this is the version in use today.)

Franco's regime brought about a strong political repression in Spain, the widespread and systematic 'cleansing' of the education system, through the D-Commission, responsible for academic appointments; the C-Commission to control changes in secondary schools; and the A- and B-Commissions to oversee universities. The government implemented an ideological and moral censorship and propaganda apparatus that effectively used modern means of mass communication (No-Do, Prensa del Movimiento (Movement Press), strict control of radio and television from 1956).

Most of the filters were merely symbolic sanctions, as many of those affected were either dead or in exile. Of those who remained in Spain some were also subject to criminal prosecution, such as Julián Besteiro, who died in prison, or John Peset, who was shot. Several of the victims of government reprisals had no special political relationship with the left, such as Flores de Lemus. Among high school teachers to be 'purified' by Franco's regime was Antonio Machado (despite having died in France); among Normal School teachers, there was Eliseo Gomez Serrano (shot), and among teachers Amos Steel and Vicente Moliner Nadal (both shot). Biescas and Tunon ( op. Cit., Pg. 16) put the figure of 7,000 teachers among the 270,000 total prisoners in concentration camps and prisons of the first Franco period, and the two-thirds of faculty exiles or dismissed. Of professors active in June 1936 at the University of Madrid (Complutense today), 44.3 percent were sanctioned. The figure is similar between teaching assistants and aides reaching 43.6 percent, although 7.6 percent of them have not found data. Complete listing of Complutense University reprisals after the Civil War.

Universities were restructured by the law of July 1943. University rectors had to be members of the Falange. The reality, both in secondary education as well as university and other higher level educational institutions, was that teachers and students, in opposition to the scientific spirit, were framed by the SEU and Servicio Nacional del Magisterio (National Teachers Service). Fascist ideals were also expressed through weekly publications, such as El Español published by the Deputy Secretary of Education and directed by Juan Aparicio. These devices were completed with the Instituto Nacional del Libro (National Institute of Newspapers), which was created in 1939 and led by Julian Pemartín, a leading ideologue of the regime. (Tunon de Lara, The Spain of the Crusade , op. cit., pg. 114).

All cultural institutions were impacted, including the Real Academia Española, from whom Ramón Menéndez Pidal resigned as director between 1939 and 1947; museums such as Museo del Prado; the Ateneo de Madrid; and others, among which were those previously identified with krausismo - Institución Libre de Enseñanza, Junta para la Ampliación de Estudios, Residencia de Estudiantes, Instituto Escuela - all of which were replaced by a new organization, the National Research Council (CSIC):

1. The National Research Council, as the supreme organ of Spanish high culture, which represent the elements of the most prestigious university academics and technicians enjoying the highest rank in the country's cultural life. This reaches to the pre-eminent position in the social and public manifestations of the national culture and relations with the outside scientific world.

2. The Supreme Council has as its spiritual patron all the glorious company of Saint isidore, Archbishop of Seville, which represents the first time our history imperial Spanish culture.

3. The emblem shall, following and adapting the Llullian tradition, an arbor scientiae, which represents a pomegranate, whose various branches in Latin, alludes to the scientific events that the Council grows. This emblem will appear on the medals and insignia of the Directors, the "ex libris" (frontispiece) of their magazines and publications and on the seal used in the official sanction of social relations.

— Order of March 8, 1940, Ministry of National Education - José Ibáñez Martín

=== Centralization of cultural control ===
While the pursuit of the peripheral nationalism fell short of a total ban on local languages and cultures (Catalan language and Catalan culture, Euskara and Basque culture, Galician and Galician culture), a policy of Castilianization was nonetheless implemented in education and in almost all public areas. (Luis Hurtado Alvarez: if you're Spanish, speak Spanish, May 18, 1937. Quoted in escueladesara.com) Even then policy was not always followed to the full extent, and with which not even all members of the regime agreed (as in the controversy between Carlos Sentís and Josep Montagut).

The allocation of areas of power between the familias del franquismo - nacionalcatolicismo, Falangist 'Blues', monarchists, Carlists (supporters of King Juan Carlos), 'Juanistas' (supporters of Juan de Borbón), military groups such as the Africanists, and other factions - corresponded to each of the areas including ministries, and did not always have well-defined functions: Catholics accounted for the Ministry of Education of Spain, which focused most of cultural policy, but the Blues had their share of political and social and apparatus in the nationalist Movement, which sought a totalitarian presence in all aspects of public life and even private. Each of the 'Blue' Francoist families controlled the country's communication media. The Church, in exchange for support for the uprising, the regime demanded control of the field that had traditionally considered theirs: education and teaching. For its part, the Falange as a single party would try to impose its support through the mass media. This explains the division of powers that the constitution made after the first administration by a law of January 30, 1938. In the Ministry of the Interior (National Service of Press and Propaganda) the Falangists had control; in Education, monarchists of Acción Española with Pedro Sainz Rodríguez in front, under the watchful eye of Cardinal Goma, primate of Spain. Colleagues appointed following the tactic of combining different ideological positions that had presided over the constitution of government. In the National Primary Education, the traditionalist Romualdo de Toledo y Robles, in Higher Education and Media, Joseph Pemartín, monarchist Acción Española, in the Technical Education and Vocational a technocrat, Augustus Krahe. Manager of Fine Arts, Eugenio d'Ors, and Archives and Libraries, Javier Lasso de la Vega.

Catholic clerical personalities were significantly elevated to positions of high influence in the ideological and cultural spheres of Spain: Justo Pérez de Urbel and other Benedictines in particular; Enrique Pla y Deniel, Isidro Goma, Leopoldo Eijo y Garay, Casimir Morcillo Gonzalez, and other bishops; or admitted to the clergy late in their careers, so-called late vocations (Ángel Herrera Oria, leader of the National Catholic Association of Propagandists, was ordained at age 53 and became a bishop; José María Albareda belonged to Catholic organization Opus Dei since 1937, was director of CSIC, and ordained a priest at age 57 years; Manuel García Morente, a leading philosopher, was ordained a priest at age 54 years), so that neo-Thomist thought (revived interest in Thomas Aquinas), or neo-Scholasticism, has been described as the dominant intellectual environment, based on the Vatican position prior to the Vatican II Council.

== Literature ==
Within Franco's Spain, and among artists in exile and in the image of Spain abroad, the Spanish Civil War (1936–39) was perpetuated as a reference to Spain's cultural life. The destruction of the Spanish artistic heritage had been of great magnitude, not only as a result of acts of war, but particularly by the iconoclastic fury of the Republican rearguard. These events were widely publicized in the new state, which in turn exhibited as an achievement its own recovery the most important collections of the Museo del Prado, except at Geneva, where Spain obtained from Vichy France two emblematic pieces from Spain under different circumstances (La Inmaculada de Soult and La dama de Elche, 1941).

Spanish cultural life after the war was tragically overshadowed by the violent death of prominent individuals identified with both sides (Federico García Lorca, Ramiro de Maeztu, Pedro Muñoz Seca). Valle Inclán and Unamuno died of natural causes (January and December 1936 respectively), and Manuel Azaña and Antonio Machado (shortly after crossing the French border in 1939). The poet Miguel Hernández died in prison in 1942. Antonio Buero Vallejo later attained great success with a bitter view of man and society in a theatre scene in which even the comedic playwrights of the winning side could not escape the absurdity (Enrique Jardiel Poncela, Miguel Mihura, Edgar Neville, José López Rubio, Antonio Lara de Gavilán ("Tono") and his follower Alfonso Paso).

=== The cultural landscape ===
The literary production of intellectuals related to the new national government, although some international celebrities of great weight returned to Spain (Arturo Duperier, José Ortega y Gasset, Salvador Dalí) and minimal scientific activity was maintained (creation of the Institute of Political Studies (1939), CSIC (1939), and the Institute of Hispanic Culture (1946)) and some areas of relations (social gatherings such as the Café Gijón, magazines such as Vértice (1937 to 1946), Escorial (1940 to 1950), Garcilaso-Juventud creadora (1943 to 1946), Espadaña (1944 to 1951), Ínsula (launched 1946), Cántico (1947 to 1949), the long Spanish postwar recovery during the 1940s and 1950s created a cultural wasteland within the destroyed, hungry and isolated Spain, exacerbated by repression, the 'purification' of the educational system and cultural institutions, the purges of books, and widespread censorship. Compared with the preceding period, called the Silver Age (la Edad de Plata), shows one of the clearest contrasts in the cultural history of Spain. The term "cultural wasteland" or "intellectual wasteland", widely used, has itself been debated by many authors and may be unfair to the actual cultural productions; but it nevertheless has the virtue of connecting itself to the essentialist debate, pessimistic and inward-looking, on the 'Being of Spain', the existentialist view of the country, that was in itself the more important intellectual subject of the time.

From the history of science, the time has come to be known as the destruction of science in Spain. Possibly the most synthesized description is to be found among some novelists, poets and playwrights in their titles: Carmen Laforet with Nada (1945), Dámaso Alonso with Hijos de la ira (Sons of Wrath) (1946); Alfonso Sastre with La mordaza (The Bite) (1954); Luis Martín-Santos with Tiempo de silencio (Time of Silence) (1962); and Carlos Barral with Años de penitencia (Years of Penance) (1975).

Vicente Aleixandre, among the Generation of '27 poets and writers, best represented the vital, intellectual commitment to an interior exile, rich but hidden. Prominent representatives of the generation, such as Dámaso Alonso and Gerardo Diego, were involved in the Franco regime's cultural institutions, while others (Luis Cernuda, Jorge Guillén, Pedro Salinas and Rafael Alberti) went into an exile shared with a host of writers (Ramón J. Sender, Claudio Sánchez-Albornoz, Américo Castro, Corpus Barga, José Bergamín, León Felipe, Francisco Ayala, Max Aub, Arturo Barea, María Zambrano, Alfonso Daniel Rodríguez Castelao ('Castelao') writing in the Galician language, Josep Carner and Mercè Rodoreda writing in the Catalan language), scientists, artists and professionals from all disciplines whose international recognition was high in all types of universities and cultural institutions, culminating in the Nobel Prizes awarded to Juan Ramón Jiménez (literature, 1956) and Severo Ochoa (medicine, 1959). The granting of the same award in 1977 to Vicente Aleixandre featured the return to Spain of surviving exiles, who saw the international recognition of the restoration of democracy in Spain. Internal exiles who gained public recognition were Juan Gil Albert and Rafael Cansinos-Asséns.

The writers closely aligned with the Franco regime (Manuel Machado's brother Antonio, a living symbol of the fratricidal division; Eduardo Marquina, Eugenio d'Ors, Vicente Risco, Lorenzo Villalonga, Julio Camba, Wenceslao Fernández Flórez, Manuel García Morente, Tomás Borrás, Jacinto Miquelarena, José María de Cossío, the Marqués de Lozoya, Rafael Sánchez Mazas, Víctor de la Serna, José María Pemán (the 'minstrel of the Crusade'), Ernesto Giménez Caballero, Manuel Halcón, Juan Antonio Zunzunegui, Ángel Valbuena Prat, Eugenio Montes, Samuel Ros, Agustín de Foxá, Luis Rosales, José María Gironella, José Luis Castillo-Puche, Emilio Romero) or those who for one reason or another tried a compromise approach, with different reception from the regime (José Martínez Ruiz ('Azorin'), Jacinto Benavente, Ramón Pérez de Ayala, Carlos Arniches, bilingual Catalan language-writer Josep Pla, and have been mostly a common destiny in their assessment by subsequent literary criticism; relatively speaking, somewhat similar to the relegation and contempt suffered by intellectuals who supported the European Fascist regimes after their defeat (examples include Louis-Ferdinand Céline, Martin Heidegger and Ezra Pound). Others, such as Camilo José Cela and Pío Baroja, have been more fortunate.

The alignment on either side of the Spanish Civil War was becoming somewhat diffuse for a growing group of intellectual personalities, both in exile and within Spain, converging on what has been called the third (una tercera) of Spain. This is the case of Manuel de Falla and Ramón Gómez de la Serna (both resided until their deaths in Argentina, but are not identified specifically with either the exiles or with the Francoist authorities, who sought to recruit them), a significant group of Republican exiles to which violence had distanced them from the Republican side since the beginning of the war, called los blancos de París (the whites of Paris): Salvador de Madariaga, Niceto Alcalá-Zamora or Alfredo Mendizabal, and the Spanish Committee for Civil Peace, established in Paris in February 1937), and other significant groups who chose to stay in Spain or who returned in the early postwar years: the physician and essayist Gregorio Marañón or philosophers José Ortega y Gasset, Javier Zubiri and Julián Marías. Symbolically, the three main leaders of the Association of Service of the Republic of 1931 (Ortega and Perez de Ayala Marañón) agreed in its hopeless rejection of opposition and the resigned acceptance of the Franco regime, returning to Spain in the 1940s. Meanwhile, a select group of intellectuals from the left of Falangism distanced themselves from the regime (the environmentalist journal Escorial, which received the controversial liberal denomination "Falangism": Pedro Laín Entralgo, Antonio Tovar, Dionisio Ridruejo, Jose Maria Alfaro Polanco, Gonzalo Torrente Ballester, José Luis López Aranguren, and Álvaro Cunqueiro, who continued to write most of his work in the Galician language.

Something similar happened with the explicit position of a remarkable group of poets to "uproot" (Dámaso Alonso's expression) and leave the "garcilasista aesthetic", named after the official youth magazine Garcilaso-Juventud creadora: Luis Rosales, Luis Felipe Vivanco, Leopoldo Panero, in favour of social poetry (magazine Espadaña, from 1944 to 1951): Eugenio de Nora, Victoriano Crémer, who is associated with the subsequent careers of Gabriel Celaya and Blas de Otero, usually identified with the internal exiles, or a group of novelists labelled "tremendistas" (Tremendismo literary movement): Camilo José Cela, La familia de Pascual Duarte (1942), Rafael García Serrano, Luis Landínez, Darío Fernández Flórez.

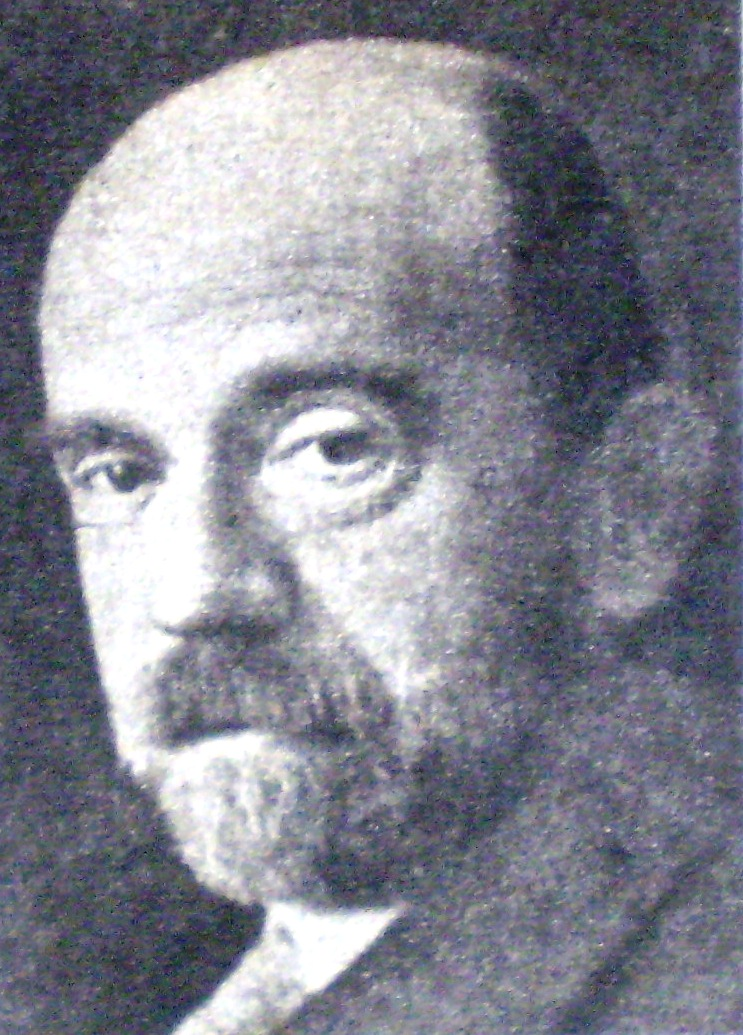
Pío Baroja.

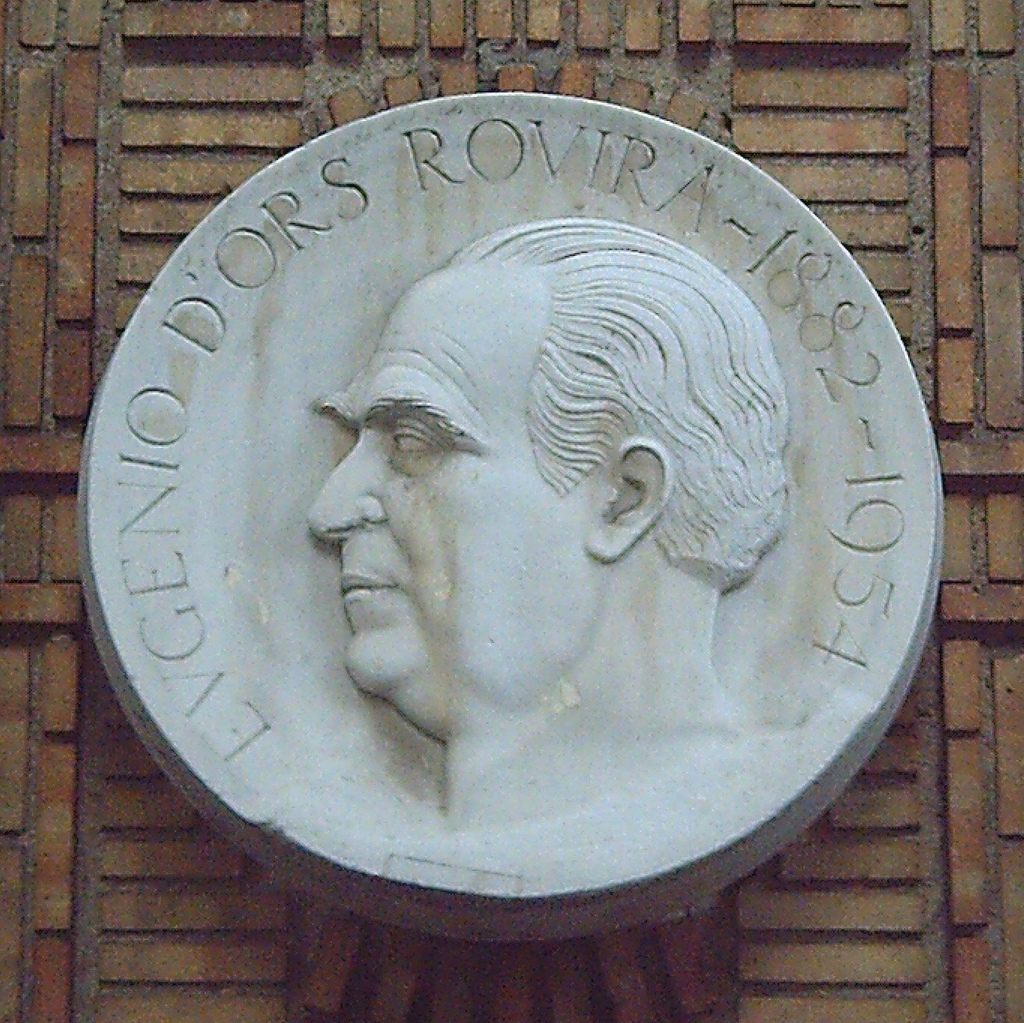
Eugenio d'Ors monument in Madrid.

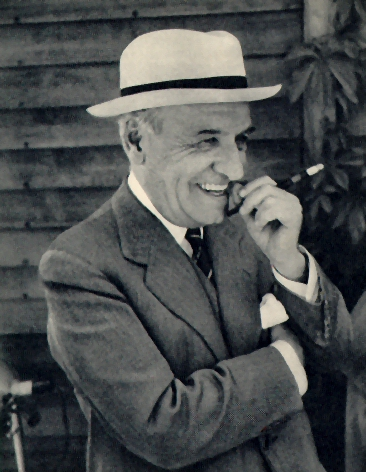
José Ortega y Gasset.

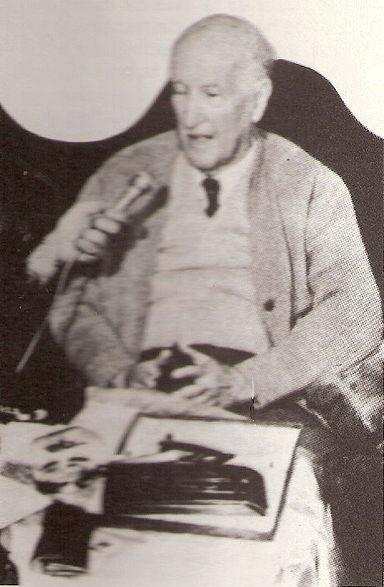
Vicente Aleixandre.

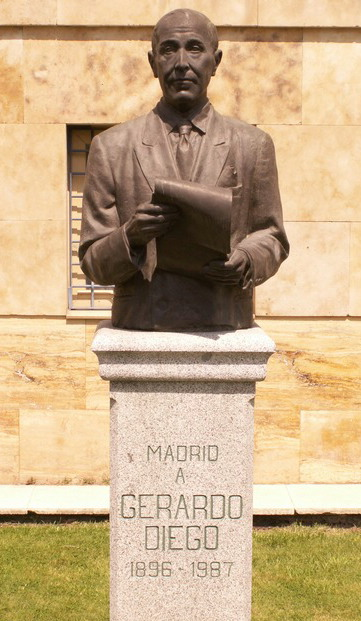
Monument to Gerardo Diego.

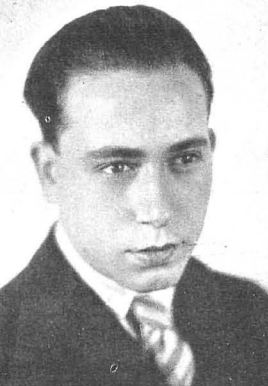
José López Rubio.

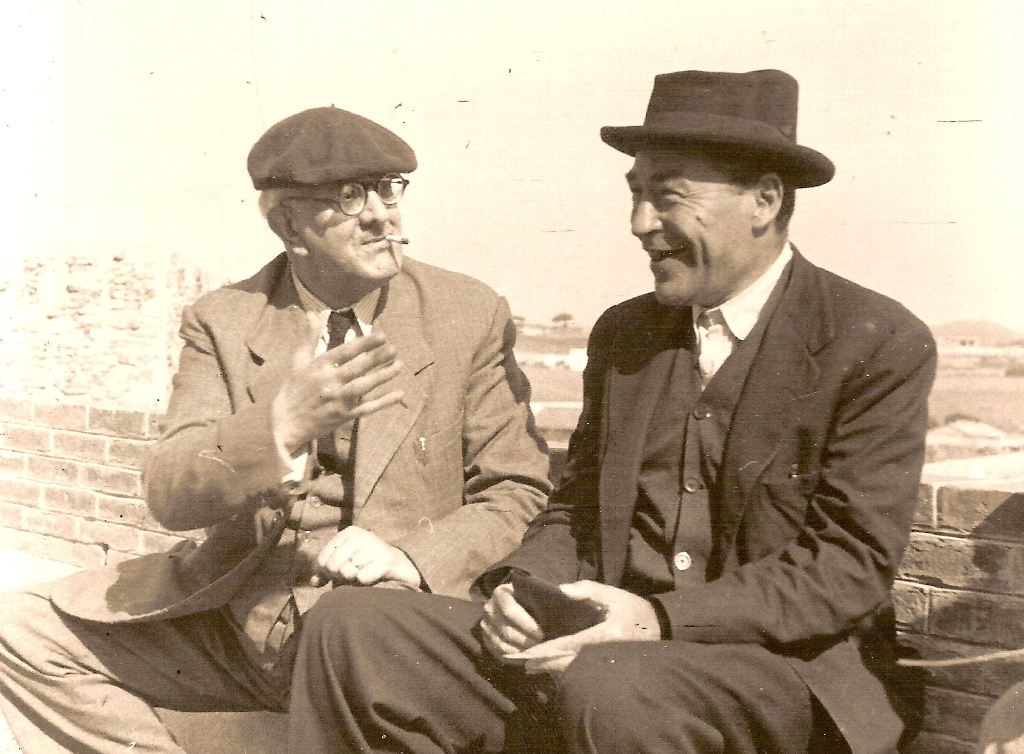
Josep Pla and Catalán language writer Manuel Brunet.

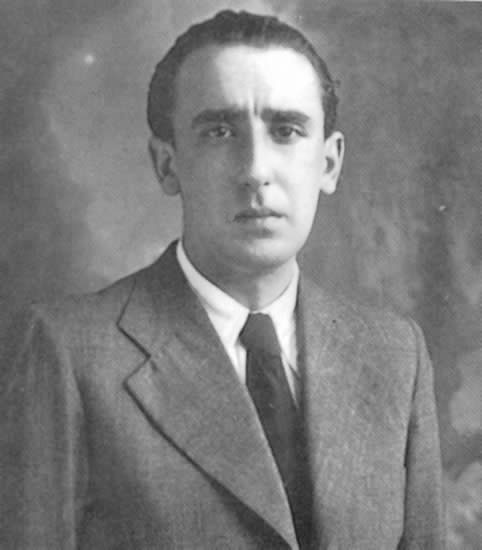
Álvaro Cunqueiro.

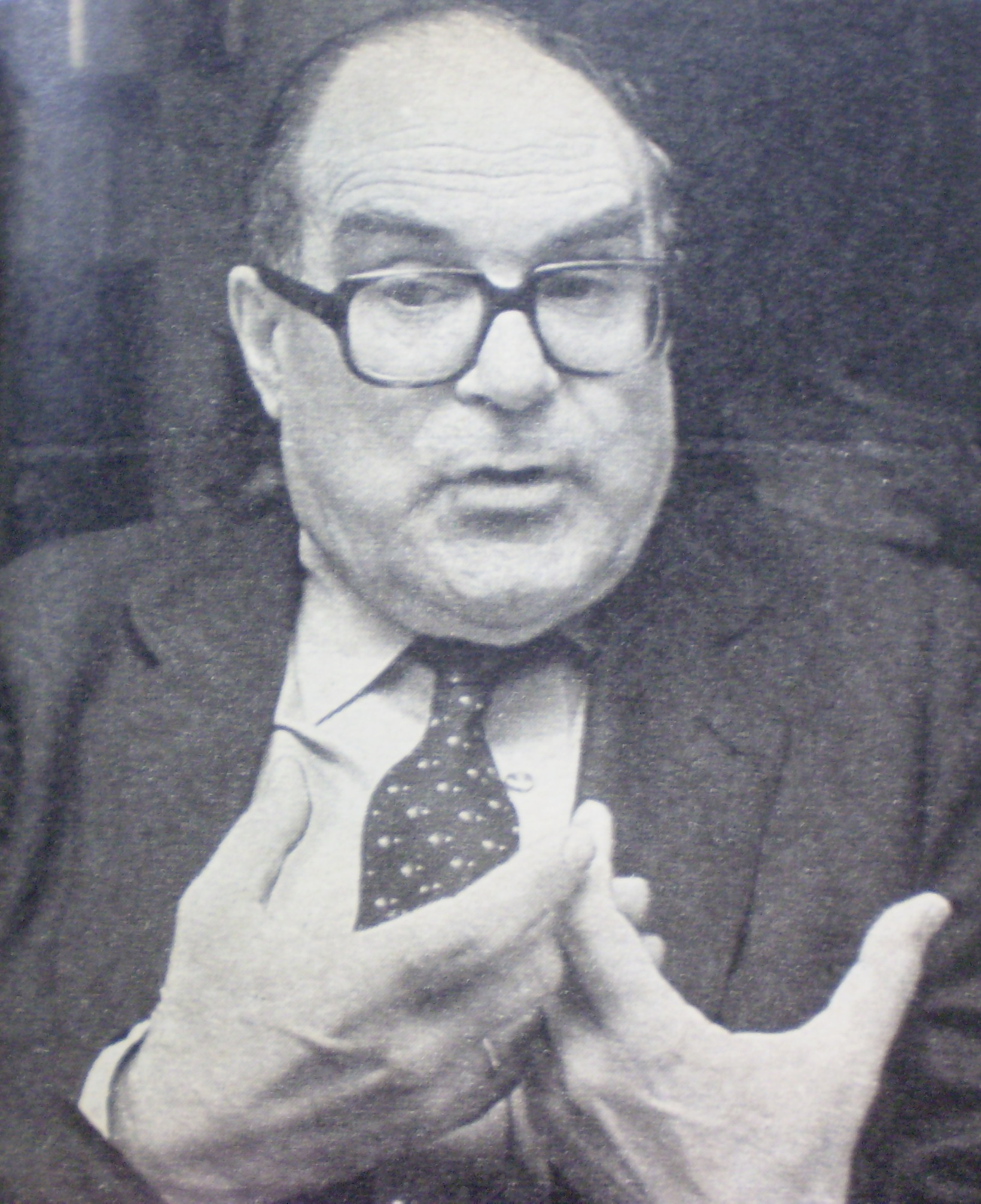
Julián Marías.

== The "openness" era ==
The end of the Franco regime was a long period, as much as the period that came before it, and it was a period in which social changes linked to economic development, industrialization, urbanization, opening to the outside and tourism, had different institutional responses, a highlight among which was the performance of Ministry of Information and Tourism (1951), led by Manuel Fraga between 1962 and 1969 (a new Press and Printing Act of 1966 was brought into effect, which replaced the previous one of 1938), and educational reformer José Luis Villar Palasí (General Education Act of 1970), at the same time that substantial changes occurred in the Catholic Church, hitherto one of the main supporters of Franco's Spain, which became clearly marked by a new distancing (following Vatican II during the pontificate of Pope Paul VI in 1963, and president Cardinal Tarancón in the Episcopal Conference of 1971). The part of the hierarchy clearly identified with the most immobile elements, was (as they themselves were called "the bunker" during the 1970s) relatively marginalized from the center positions of power. In 1967, the government enacted a law to protect Religious Freedom. The Western Alliance Sentinel (rhetorical expression for Spain and Franco himself, identified with each other) with the United States to defend the free world had become a key support. The Franco regime even applied for membership in the European Common Market, which was denied approval because of Spain's lack of democracy (1962).

The regime adapted Franco's charismatic ideology of the technocrat (a name which was used to designate economic and other technical experts linked to Catholic group Opus Dei), while the ideological alternatives were raised with increasing boldness. The consequences came to the point that the result came to be described as a fight or dispute of cultural hegemony, a hegemony crisis or crisis ideológica.50 Some newspapers (Diario Madrid, forced to close in 1971; Informaciones) and magazines (Triunfo, Cuadernos para el Diálogo, 1963–1976) exploited to the limits the relaxation of censorship, sometimes exceeding the tolerance of the authorities and arousing scandals, which made them political and cultural references.

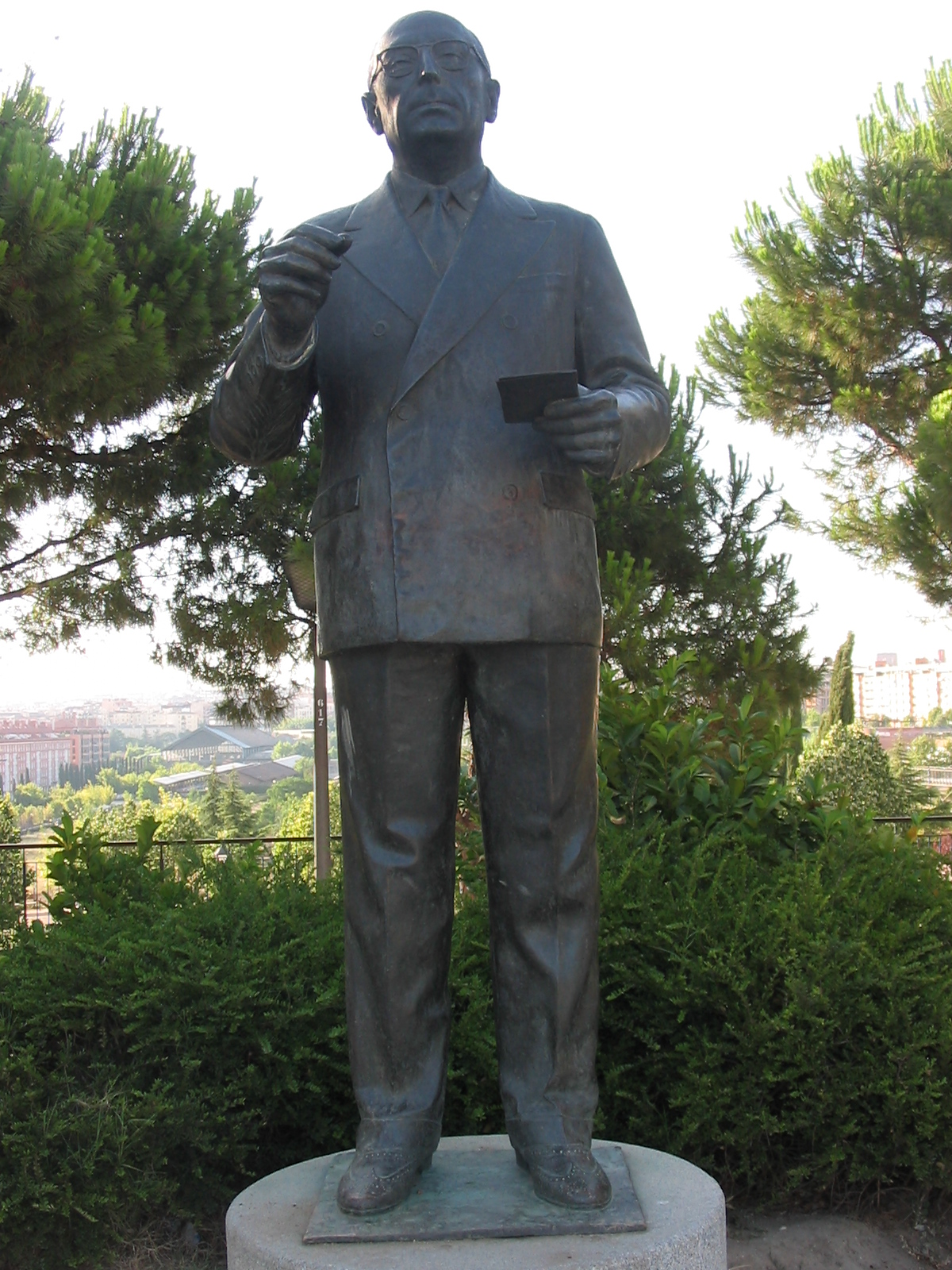
Monument to Enrique Tierno Galván.

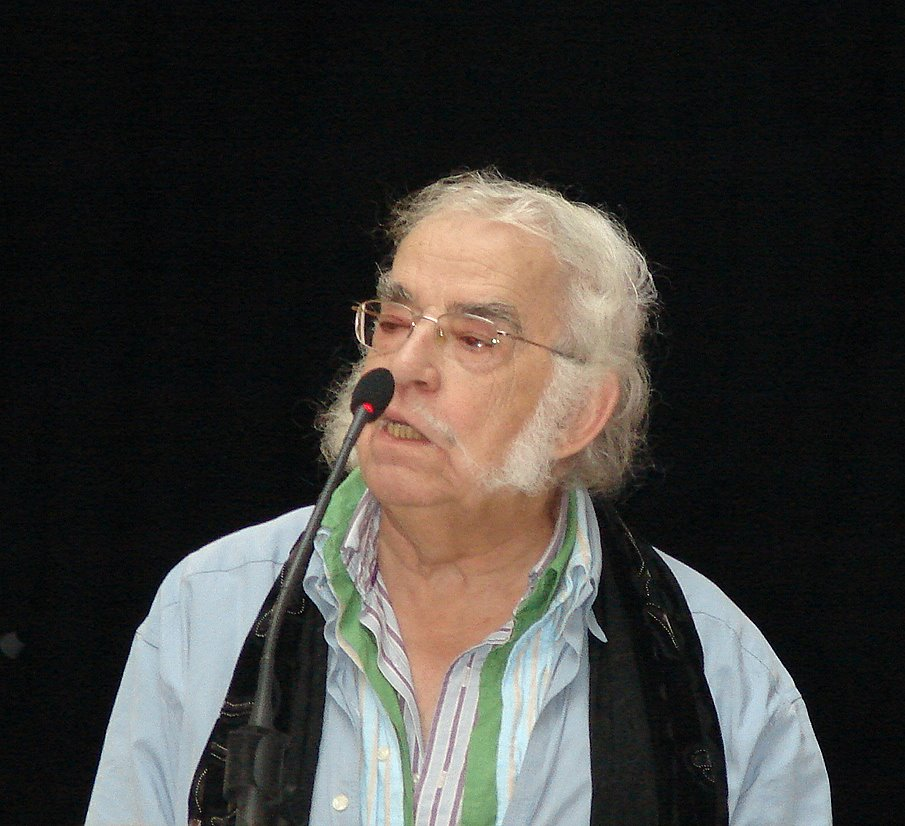
Agustín García Calvo.

The university, a challenging environment since the events of 1956 (led by youth of both sides), became one of the strongholds of the opposition to Franco, as demonstrated in February 1965, and the scandal of the deprivation of university chairs to Enrique Tierno Galván, Jose Luis Lopez Aranguren and Agustín García Calvo, in solidarity with Antonio Tovar and José María Valverde. The incidents of 1968, simultaneous to the so-called revolution of 1968 worldwide, were the extension of these events.

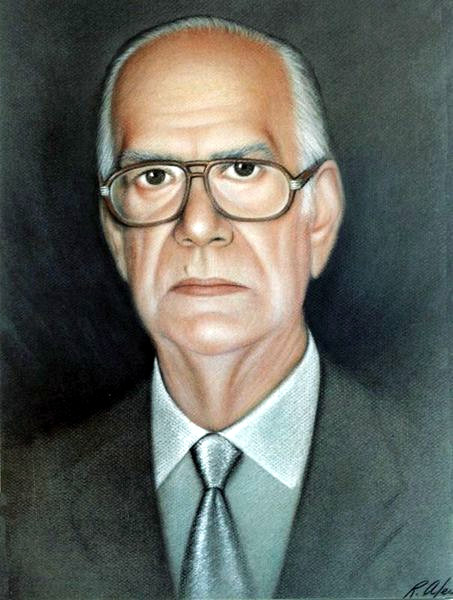
Camilo José Cela.

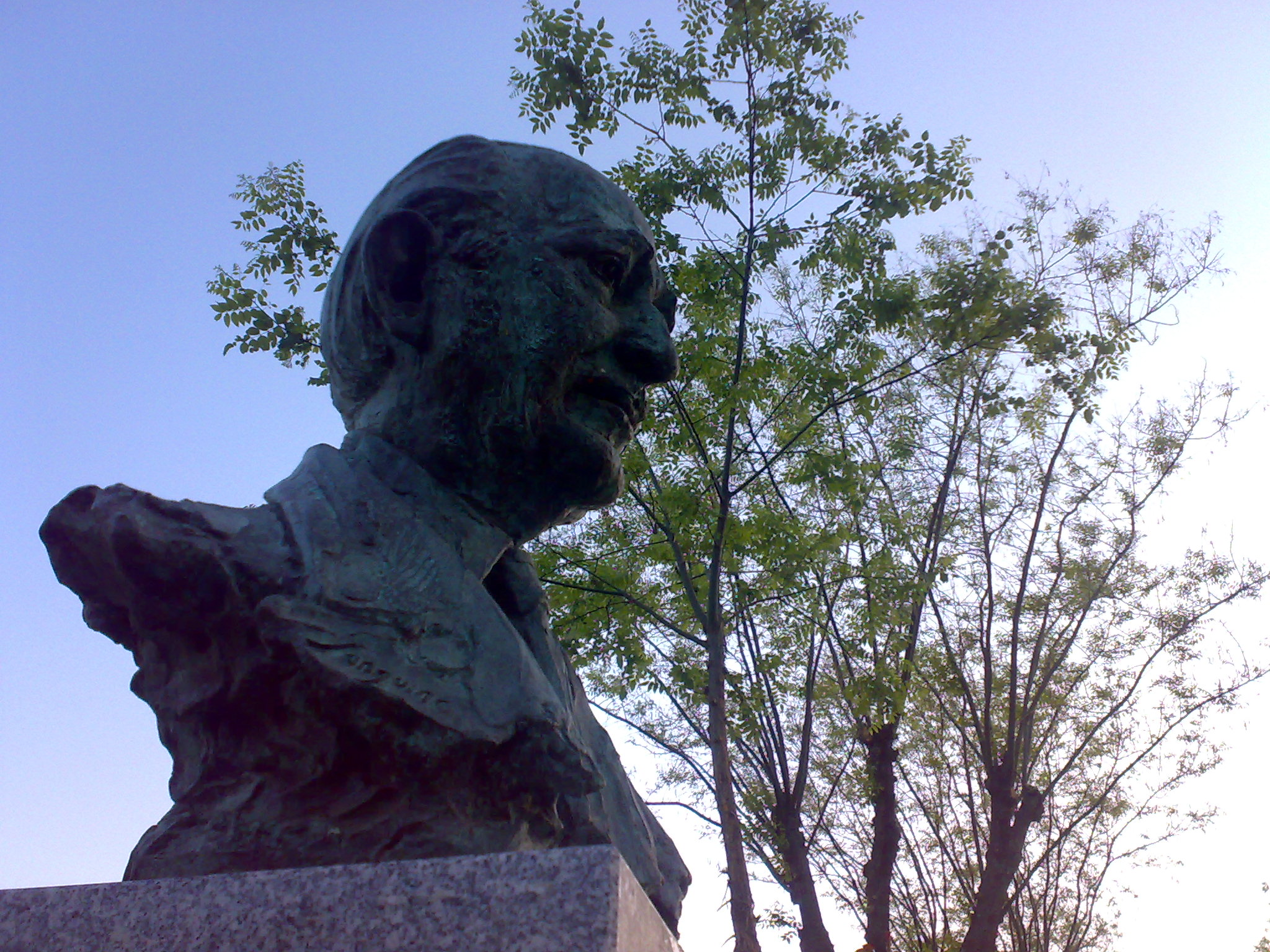
Monument to Antonio Buero Vallejo.

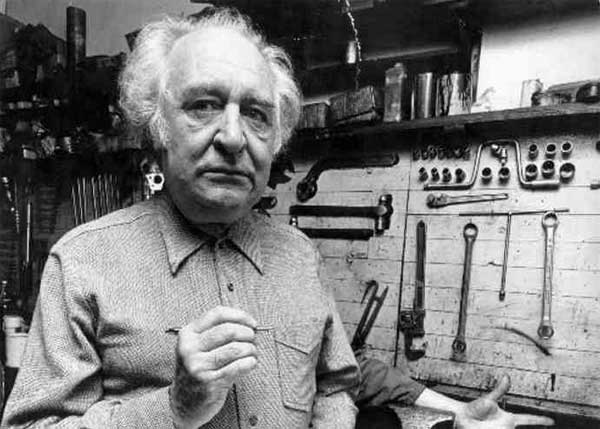
Gabriel Celaya.

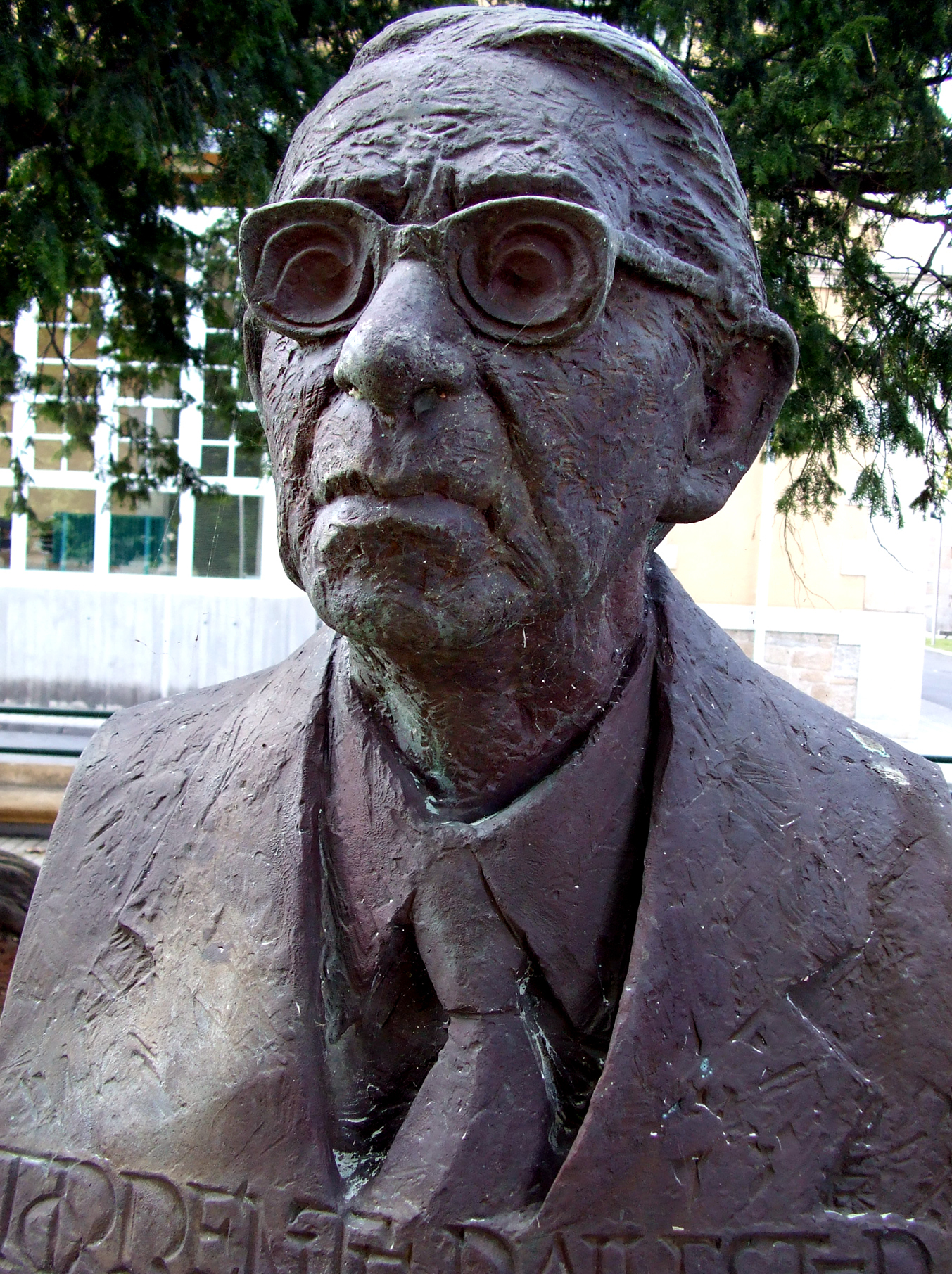
Monument to Gonzalo Torrente Ballester.

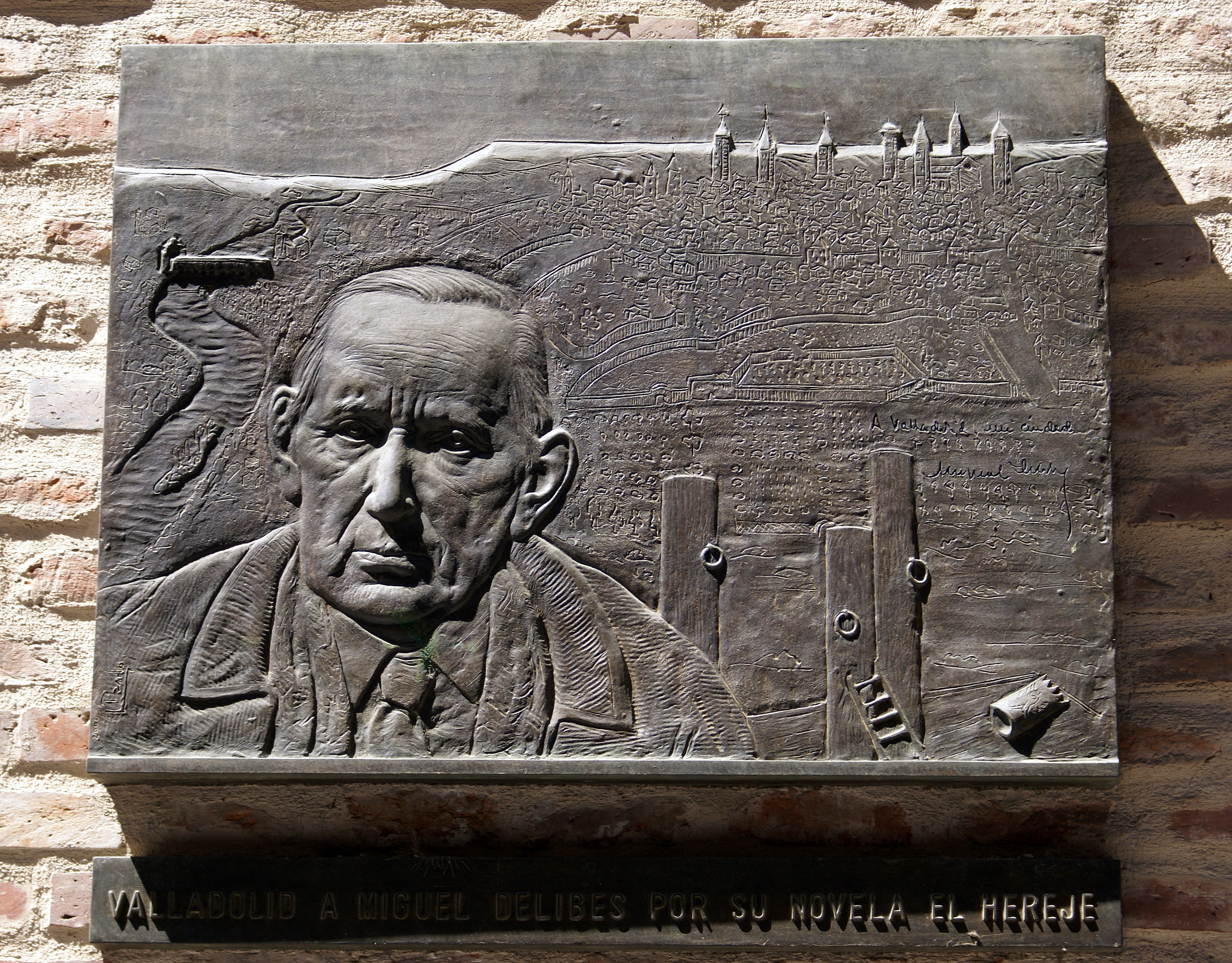
Plaque dedicated to Miguel Delibes.

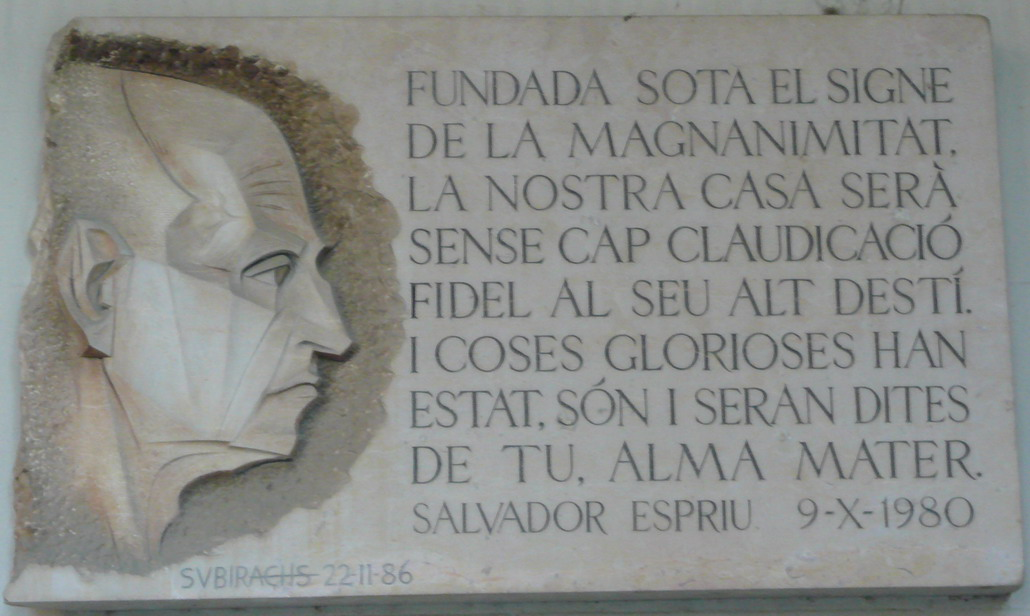
Plaque dedicated to Salvador Espriu.

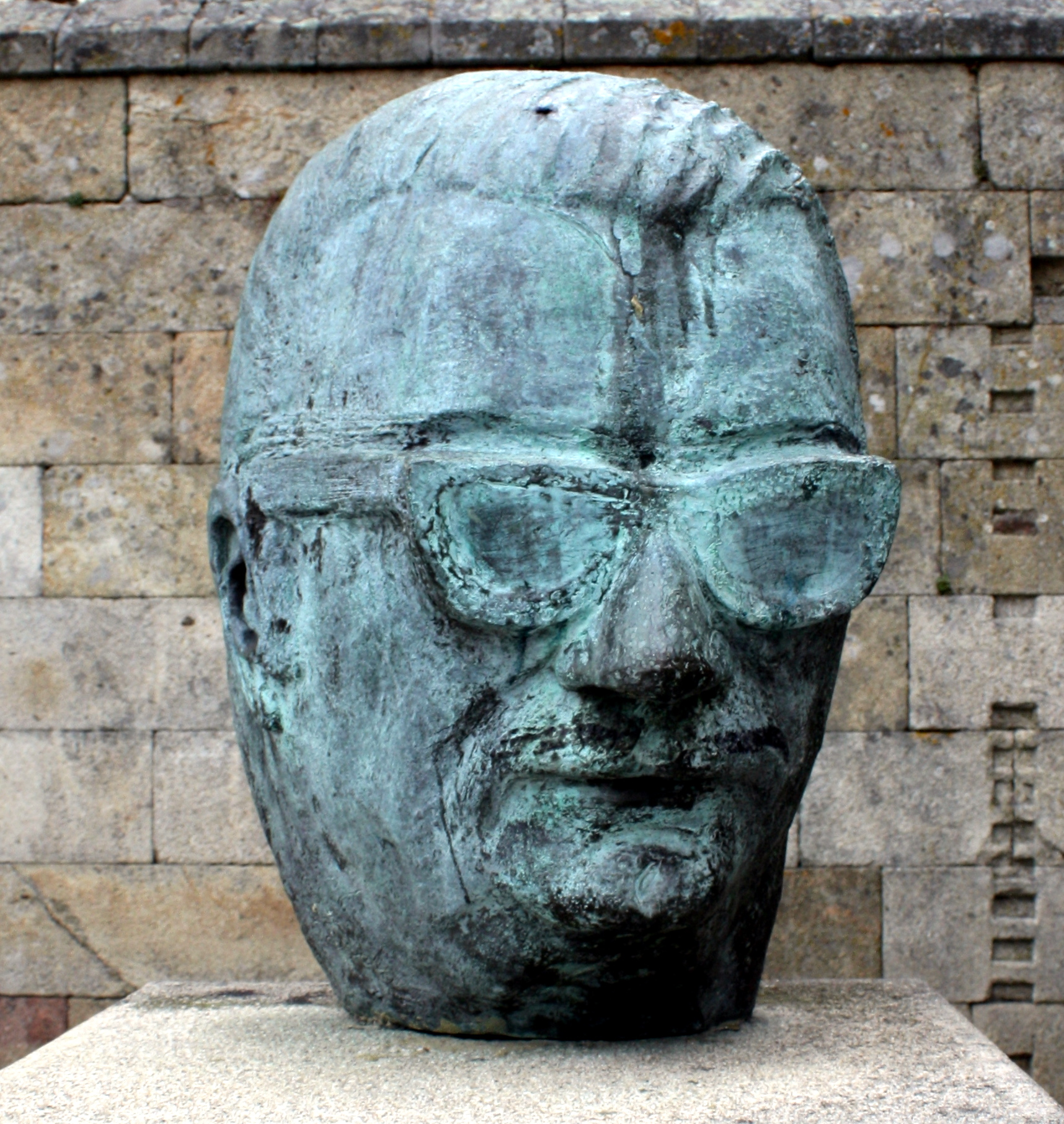
Monument to Celso Emilio Ferreiro.
