= Celso Emilio Ferreiro =

Galician activist, writer, poet and journalist (1912–1979)

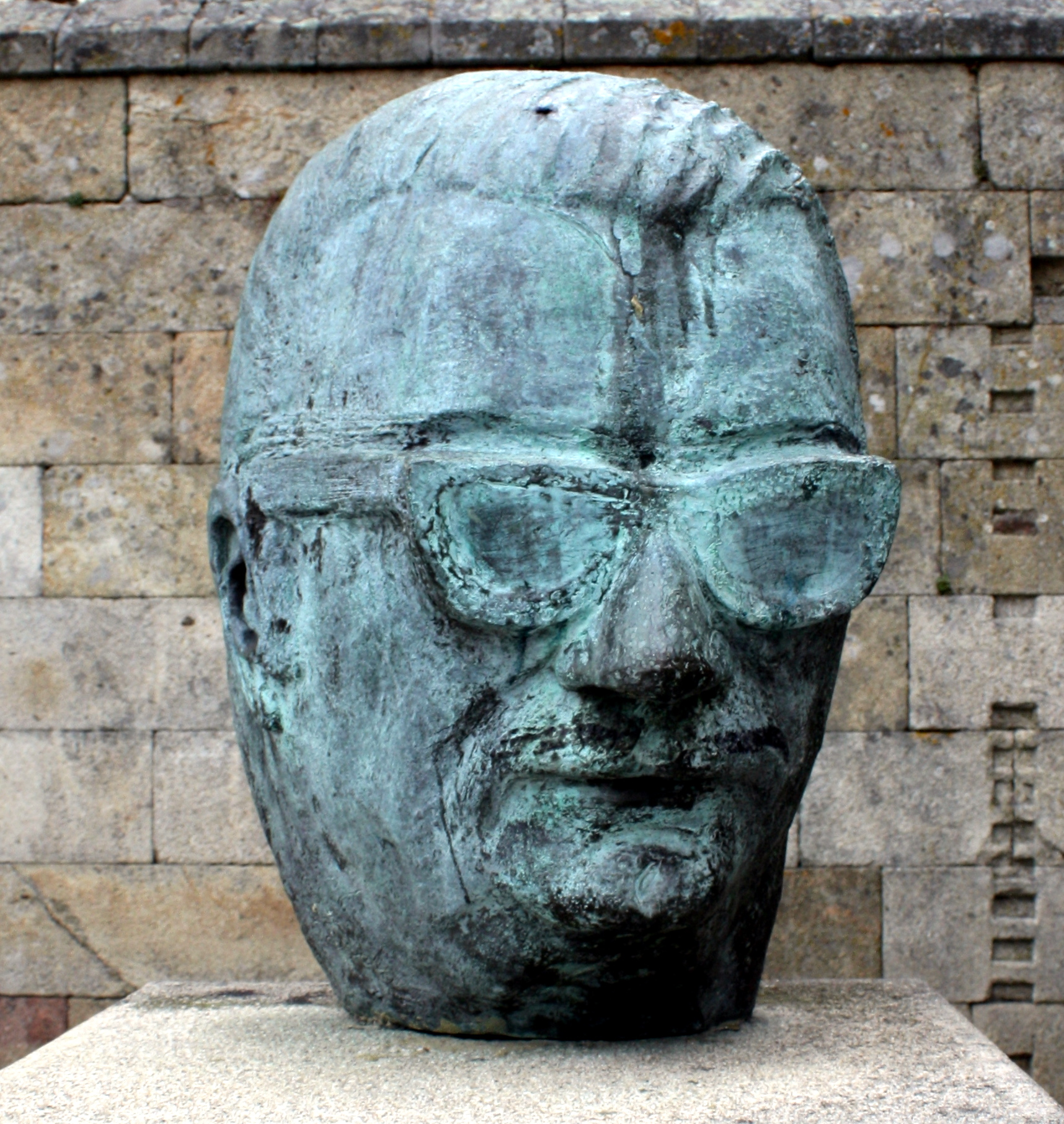
Sculpture of the Late. Celso Emilio Ferreiro head in Celanova, Ourense, Galicia.jpg

Celso Emilio Ferreiro Míguez (1912–1979) was a Galicianist activist, writer, poet, and political journalist.

== Early years ==
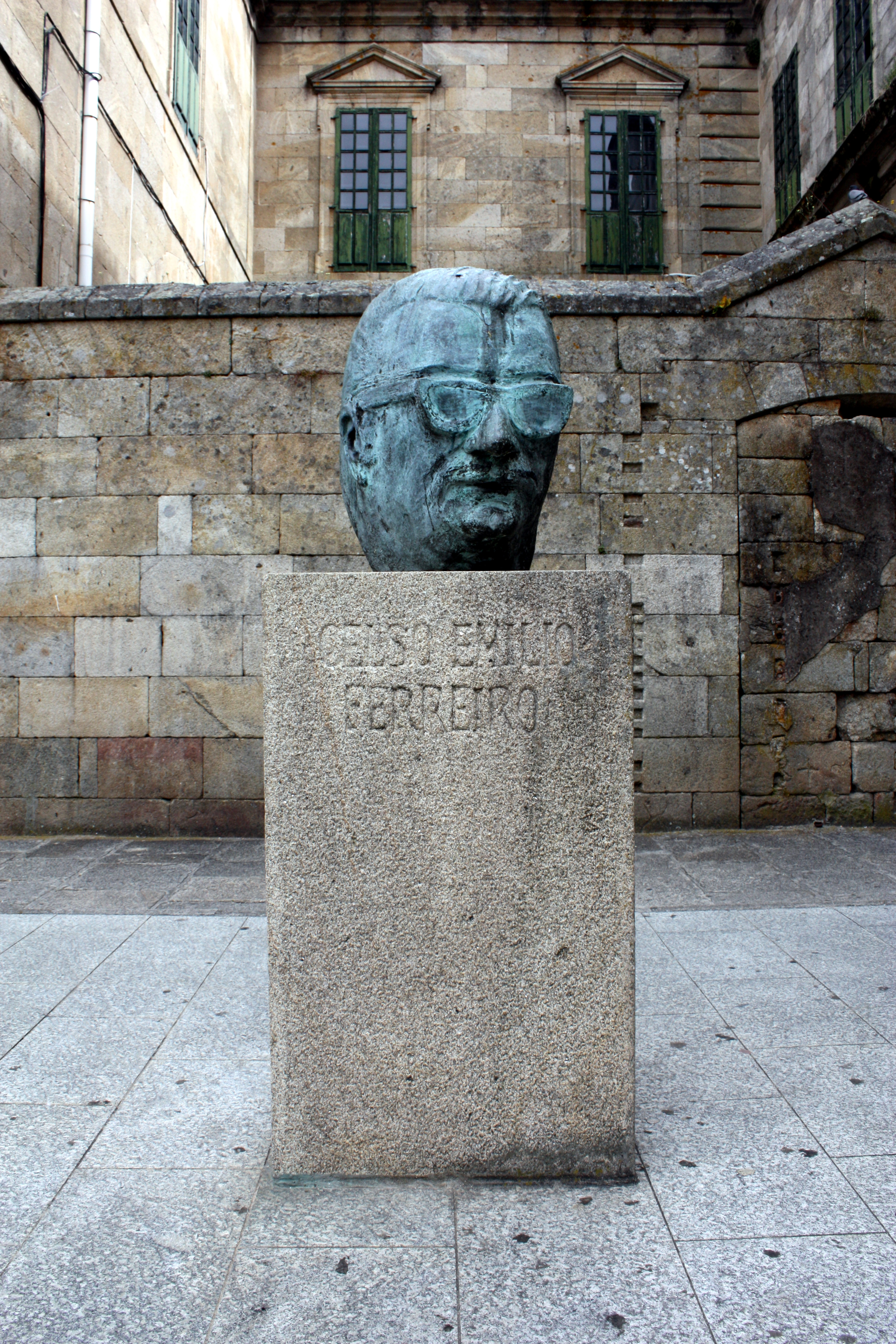
Sculpture of Celso Emilio Ferreiro in Celanova.

Ferreiro was born in Celanova, into a well-off Galicianist family. In 1932, at the age of twenty, he created the Mocedades Galeguistas de Celanova (Galicianist Youths of Celanova) with Xosé Velo Mosquera. In 1934 he also participated in the creation of the Federación de Mocedades Galeguistas (Federation of Galicianist Youths). Some time after this Ferreiro got into trouble because of an article published in his magazine Guieiro.

== Francoist Spain ==
Ferreiro was mobilized in the Spanish Civil War by the Nationalist troops. He studied law, and contributed to many magazines and newspapers over the period of the Francoist State.

In 1966 Ferreiro travelled to Venezuela, where he collaborated with the Galician Brotherhood. He fell out with the Galician nationalists in Venezuela, and in response published the poetry collection Viaxe ao pais dos ananos (Journey to the land of the dwarves). He founded the Patronato da Cultura Galega (Patronage of Galician Culture), and was part of President Rafael Caldera's cabinet.

== Later life and death ==
After returning to Spain Ferreiro lived in Madrid, where he worked as a journalist. He wrote in Galician and in Castilian, but his most important work was his Galician-language poetry. Ferreiro died in Vigo, Galicia, Spain on 31 August 1979. He was buried in his birth city of Celanova.

== Reception and legacy ==
A review of his work in 1964 wrote: "It is possible that some poets that write in Castilian - Pablo Neruda, Crémer, Celaya, Hierro, Gloria Fuertes - write about much the same topics that the Galician poet does. But Celso Emilio Ferreiro beats them all, if we ignore Neruda, because he has more poetic talent and because he is more sincere."

The Día das Letras Galegas (Galician Literature Day) was dedicated to Ferreiro in 1989.

His collection of poetry,"Longa noite de pedra" ("Long night of stone"), a lament at the anti-Galician policies of Francoist Spain, is one of the best-known and most powerful works of Galician poetry of all time. One poem from that collection, 'Maria Soliña', has been described as one of the best-known Galician poems of the 20th century.

2012 was officially named 'Year of Celso Emilio Ferreiro' in Galicia in honor of 100 years since his birth.

== Books ==
- Cartafol de poesía (A poetry folder)
- O sono sulagado (The drowned dream)
- Viaxe ao país dos ananos (Journey to the land of the dwarves)
- Terra de ningures (Nowhere's land)
- Onde o mundo se chama Celanova (Where the world is called Celanova)
- Longa noite de pedra (Long night of stone)
- Cimeterio privado (Private cemetery)
