= Oriol Bohigas =

Spanish architect and urban planner (1925–2021)

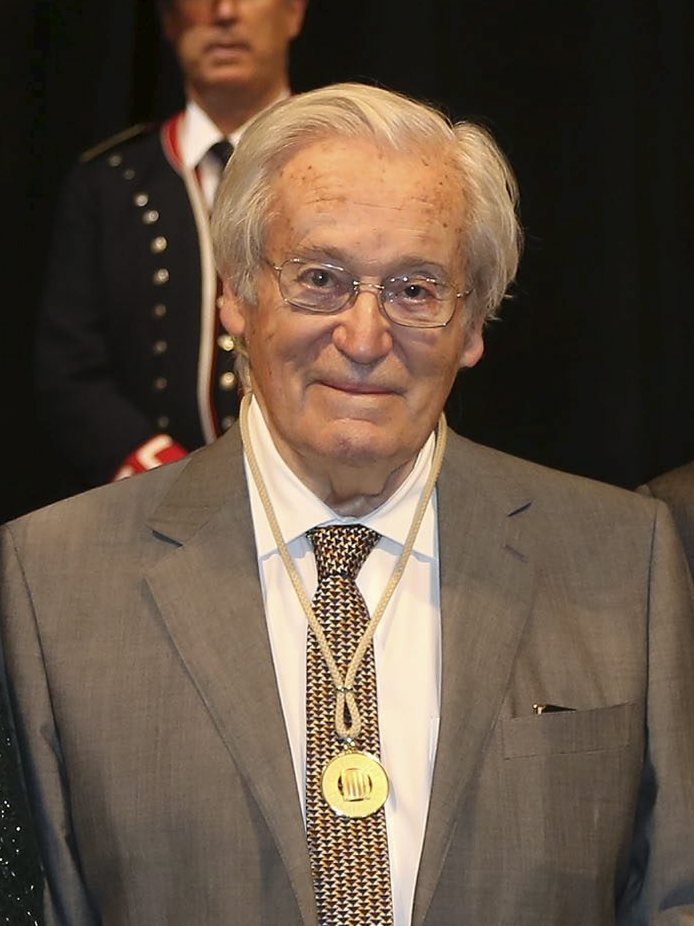
- Bohigas in 2013
- Born: 20 December 1925; Barcelona, Spain
- Died: 30 November 2021 (aged 95); Barcelona, Spain

Oriol Bohigas i Guardiola (20 December 1925 – 30 November 2021) was a Spanish architect and urban planner, known for his work in the modernization of Barcelona.

== Early life ==
Bohigas was born in Barcelona, Spain, on 20 December 1925, in a Catalan bourgeois family. His father was the philologist Pere Bohigas i Balaguer, and he studied at the Institut-Escola de la Generalitat. During the Civil War, he moved to Olot, province of Girona, where he continued his high school studies.

Bohigas graduated in architecture in 1951 from the Escuela Técnica Superior de Arquitectura de Barcelona (Barcelona School of Architecture), where, in 1963, he obtained the title of Doctor of Architecture.

== Career ==
Bohigas was a critic of the architecture of his city and an advocate of modernity from as early as age 20. In 1950, the group "Grup d'Arquitectes i Tècnics Catalans per al Progrés de l'Arquitectura Contemporània", to which he belonged, was condemned, as the censor considered that modern architecture was "leftist-separatist". In January of the following year, in the weekly Destino, he harshly criticized Francoist architecture and, from there, founded the "Grupo R" of modern architects.

At the beginning of the 1960s, Bohigas founded the firm MBM Arquitectes with David Mackay and Josep Martorell and published his first book, Barcelona entre el Pla Cerdà i el barraquisme (Barcelona between the Pla Cerdà and the shantytown). In 1964, he joined the Escuela Técnica Superior de Arquitectura de Barcelona as a professor, and in 1977, he was elected its director, a position he held until 1980. He was a member of the political current of progressive Catalanism and the gauche divine, which combined the progressive, intellectual and anti-Franco bourgeoisie.

In the first democratic mandate of the Barcelona City Council in 1980, Bohigas was appointed Urban Planning Delegate under the mayoralty of Narcís Serra, a position he held until 1984. He promoted the urban transformation of the city under his principle of "monumentalizing the periphery and functionalizing the center"; the neighborhoods would be equipped with facilities and infrastructures, and the city center would be devoted to services and stores, with public schools. When he left the delegation, he continued to maintain his urban planning commitment to the city from his private professional office. In the local elections of 1991, he joined the Socialists' Party of Catalonia candidacy as an independent. After being elected, Mayor Pasqual Maragall named him head of the Department of Culture with the mandate to provide the city with large cultural infrastructures. On 5 April 1994, Oriol Bohigas resigned due to continuous postponements of his cultural projects caused by the city's post-Olympic economic crisis.

Bohigas' most important work as an urban planner was the projects relative for entire remodeling and redevelopment project of the city of Barcelona for the 1992 Summer Olympics. He designed, with his office partners, the new neighborhood of La Vila Olímpica del Poblenou, which was built on the industrial district of Icària, which allowed the city to open up to the sea through the rearrangement of the ramblas. He also designed the Port Olímpic. During this period, in which he also designed buildings such as the Design Museum of Barcelona. For the Seville Expo '92, he designed the "Future Pavilion".

Bohigas' architectural style transitioned from Noucentisme to rationalism, and his ideal of the city drew as much from Le Corbusier and Ludwig Mies van der Rohe as from Josep Lluís Sert and Republican Catalonia and that led him to be considered the father of modern and Olympic Barcelona.

Bohigas was also a cultural manager. Between 1975 and 1999, he headed Ediciones 62, which he helped found, directed the Fundació Joan Miró between 1981 and 1988, and between 2003 and 2011, was president of the Ateneu Barcelonès.

== Personal life and death ==
In the 1970s, he married architect Beth Galí, who was his office partner, with whom he had five children. His son Josep is also an architect.

With a progressive and republican political ideology, during the Catalan sovereignty challenge of the 2010s, he declared himself pro-independence and signed a manifesto in favor of a consultation on the right to self-determination of the Catalans.

Suffering from Parkinson's disease since 2015, Bohigas died on 30 November 2021 at the age of 95 at his home in Barcelona .

== Awards ==
Some of the Bohigas' awards are:

- Barcelona City Gold Medal of Artistic Merits (1986)
- Medal of Urbanism of the Académie d'architecture (1988)
- Sikkens Award (1989)
- Gold Medal of Architecture from the CSCAE (1990)
- Creu de Sant Jordi (1991)
- The City of Barcelona Award of International Projection (1999)
- Gold Medal from the Col·legi Oficial d'Arquitectes de Catalunya (2007)
- National Award of Architecture (2006)
- National Award of Culture (2011)
- Gold Medal from the Generalitat de Catalunya (2013)

== Architectural works ==
Bohigas' best known works are:

- Escola Thau Barcelona (1974)
- La Vila Olímpica del Poblenou and the Olympic Port (1992)
- "Pabellón del Futuro" of the Seville Expo '92 (1992)
- Palau Nou de La Rambla, Barcelona (1993)
- Pompeu Fabra University (2001)
- Offices building for the Trade Union UGT. Barcelona (2002–2008)
- Tecnocampus University in Mataró (2004–2011)
- Enlargement of the El Corte Inglés at Plaça de Catalunya (2004)
- Liceu Metropolitan station. Barcelona (2005–2008)
- Auditorium and Sala Gaudí in La Pedrera building from Gaudí. Barcelona (2005–2008)
- Central Police Station in Plaça Espanya. Barcelona (2005–2010)
- White tower in Plaça Europa. Hospitalet del Llobregat (2006–2010)
- La casa dels Xuklis in Barcelona (2006–2011)
- Offices building for RBA Editors. Barcelona (2007–2011)
- Disseny HUB Barcelona (2001–2003)
- Transformation of the area around the Station in Parma (Italy) (2001–2015)

== Books ==
He published amongst others the following books:

- Els altis i baixos de l'arquitectura catalana (1961)
- Momentos estelares de la arquitectura (1961)
- Barcelona entre el plà Cerdà i el barraquisme (1963)
- La arquitectura moderna (1967)
- Contra una arquitectura adjetivada (1969)
- Polèmica d'arquitectura catalana (1970)
- Arquitectura española de la Segunda República (1970)
- Proceso y erótica del Diseño (1972)
- Once arquitectos (1976)
- Historia de las tipologías arquitectónicas (1979)
- Reconstrucció de Barcelona (1985)
- Combat d'incerteses. Dietari de records I (1989)
- Quatre maneres de fer arquitectura (1990)
- Dit o fet. Dietari de records II (1992)
- Barcelona olímpica: ciudad renovada (1992)
- El present des del futur (1996)
- Contra la incontinencia urbana. Reconsideración moral de la arquitectura y la ciudad (2004)
- Passar Comptes. Dietari de records III (2012)

== See also ==
- Street names in Barcelona
- Urban planning of Barcelona
