= Tecnocampus =

Coordinates: 41°31′40.36″N 2°26′4.69″E

Tecnocampus is a scientific park in the city of Mataró in Catalonia, Spain, forming part of Pompeu Fabra University. It was inaugurated in November 2009 and it includes three faculties (Polythecnic, Economics and Health), more than one hundred enterprises and a conference center.

It is a member of the Catalan network of scientific and technological parks, member of the Spanish association of scientific and Technological parks, and the unique scientific park in the Maresme region. The building was designed by one of the prestigious Catalan architects firm MBM ARQUITECTES, integrated by Josep Martorell, Oriol Bohigas, David Mackay, Oriol Capdevila and Francesc Gual.

The Tecnocampus facilities occupy 50,000 m2 in front of the beach, and the building consists of three different spaces.

== Address ==
Avda. Ernest Lluch 32, 08302 Mataró (Barcelona) Spain
