= Juan d'Ors =

Spanish singer and actor

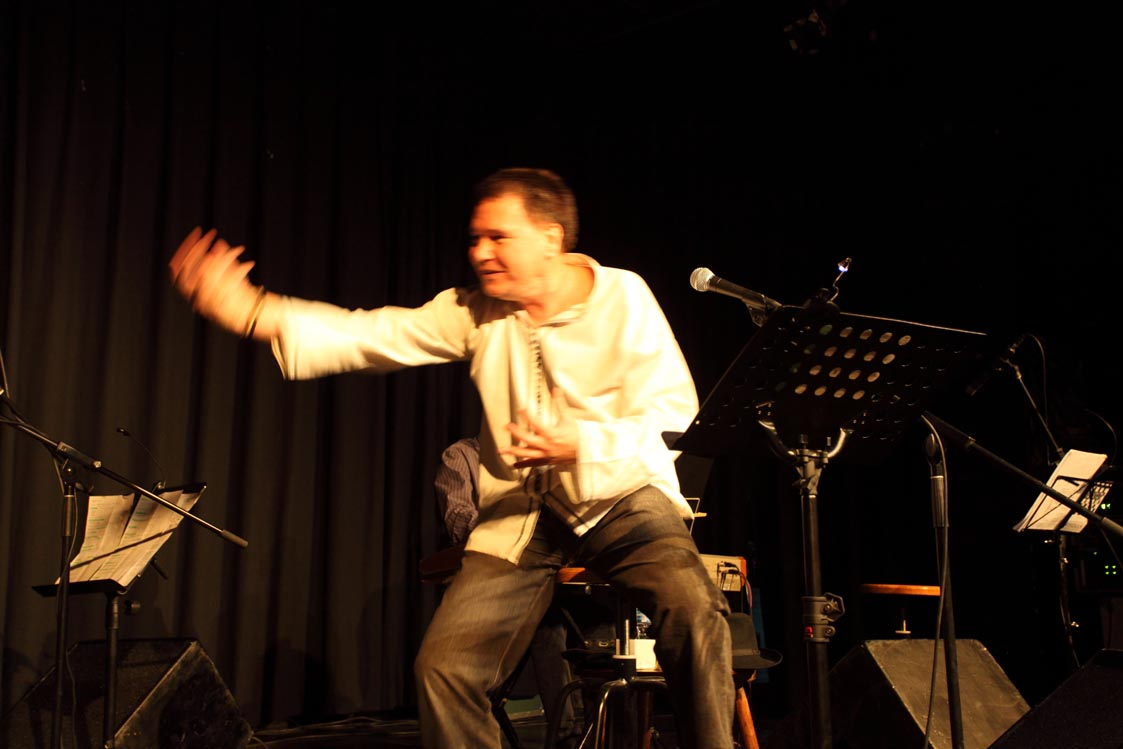

Background information
- Born: December 8, 1957
- Genres: Cover version, singer-songwriter, instrumental.
- Occupations: Singer, musician, actor, writer, producer.

Juan d'Ors was born in Madrid, Spain, December 8, 1957. His grandfather was the philosopher and art critic Eugenio d'Ors. He is the son of Juan Pablo d'Ors Pérez, a humanist doctor, and María Luisa Fuhrer, a philologist. He is a singer, musician, actor, writer, film-maker, and "Tintin" expert ("Tintinologist").

== Biography ==
In April 1984, he published an ethic and aesthetic manifesto on Tintin´s style "ligne claire" (clear line), in the Madrilenian postmodernist magazine La Luna. The text caused controversy and anticipated a new polemic emerging in October on the occasion of "Tintin Imaginary Museum", exhibition organized by Fundació Joan Miró in Barcelona.

His novels Belisa y el explorador de almas and No podrás ser feliz were both successively selected in the Premio Planeta de Novela (Planeta Prizes) last vote in 1984 and 1985. However they were never released. Most of d´ Ors abundant and continuous narrative work written between his childhood and marriage still remains unpublished.

In 1985, he started working as a voiceover actor. In 1988, he published his essay Tintin, Hergé... y los demás, which has been suggested as one of his successful works. The book was reprinted in 1989.

In 1990, he married Mónica Rabasa who gave birth to their only son, Jorge. The following year, he directed Spanish versions dubbing and took part as a singer and actor in series and films for several years. In 1999, he separated from his wife.

Progressively, he became surrounded by the fellow musicians needed in each occasion, depending on his own musical evolution: Olivier Chauzu, Adán Latonda, Gonzalo Rabasa, Jordi Pinyol, Albert Anguela, Félix Arribas, Daniel García, Costanzo Laini, Donato Goyeneche, Tomás Álvarez etc. Together they spread out all the sensibility and imagination necessary, they also used different types of promotion strategies.

For two years, he fulfilled a giant musical work, producing, adapting and transforming more than thirty songs assembled in two main blocks “Tiempos” and “Latidos”. Nearly at the same time he recorded more than forty instrumental pieces on his own voice – "Tic – tac; bom – bom" –, which he wishes to perform with a chamber orchestra.

Currently, d´Ors works in the arts as a singer, composer, arranger and producer, while also maintaining work in the literary and performing mediums.

His current interests concentrate on videoclip: the first and second were made together with the producer Javier Cano, the third with the photographer Ignacio Cerezo and the fourth one, a jingle-soundtrack with the firm Posovisual. Also Juan d´Ors would like to contribute to the future creation of a permanent live cultural space in Spain.

From a musical point of view, 2014 has been an important year for Juan d´Ors. In June he fulfilled 32 versions recordings of The Beatles at Galileo Galilei Concert Hall in Madrid. The works featured by a very pure sound, in acoustic and minimalist format, in the singer – songwriter style, paying special care to the dynamics. Together with Diana Valencia, Daniel Saavedra, Javier Simón and William Carreazo, the video can be watched in two parts in its own video channel. In September, Flamenco making – of and videoclip are published. His fifth work being a personal tribute to the 50th anniversary of Los Brincos. It was filmed in Cádiz, with Urban Sketchers from different groups. The film has its own official web in Facebook.

== Works ==
=== Music ===
Discography /Records:

- Trovadores de silencios (Book / Record. Calambur, 2010)
- A Christmas Carol (Audio – Book. Karonte-Nuba Records, 2006)

Videoclips:

- Flamenco (Un videoclip de Juan d'Ors) (September 2014)
- Pasado [El videoclip] (June 2013)
- Tiempos [El videoclip] (July 2011)
- Eleanor Rigby (December 2010)
- Himno a Venus (March 2010)

Most important performances:

- Juan d'Ors canta Beatles (2012–2014)
- Tiempos – Una suite de canciones (2009–2011)
- Juan d'Ors canta a Lluís Llach (2004–2007).

=== Literature ===
- Monólogos (Magazine "El Invisible Anillo" nº 2, December 2006).
- Por un sí o por un no (Translation of the book by Nathalie Sarraute. ADE Publishers, Madrid, 1994. And El Milagro Editorial, México DF, 2000).
- Tintín, Hergé... y los demás (Essay. Ediciones Libertarias, 1988 and 1989).
- No podrás ser feliz (Unpublished novel Planeta Prize 1985 last vote selection).
- Belisa y el explorador de almas (Unpublished novel Planeta Prize 1985 last vote selection).

=== Dubbing works ===
- B. D. Wong in, among other plays, the serie Law and Order: Special Victims Unit and the film Focus
- Lou Reed in 'So far, so close', by Wim Wenders
- Robert Wagner
- Andrew McCarthy
- Rob Schneider
- Timothy Spall
- Antonio Fargas
- Lou Diamond Phillips
- Tintin (in The Adventures of Tintin (TV series))
- Ray (in Ghostbusters)
- Tom (in Nicolás)
- Raticus (in Flying Rhino Junior High)
- Koji (in Medabots)
- Kiba (in Naruto)
- Fish Eye (Sailor Moon Super S)
- Jesse (in Bakugan)
- Father (in Brady's Beasts)
- Darwin (in The Wild Thornberrys)
- Jesucristo and Hitler (in Family Guy)
- Matt Groening (in The Simpsons)
- Pesadillo (in SamSam)
- Thomas and Pierre Chang (in Lost)

=== Director, adaptor, singer, musical director ===
- The Minimighty Kids (Adaptor, musical director and singer in Opening Theme)
- Piezas (Canal+)
- Parejas Y ladrones
- Student body
- La única verdad
- Life is sweet (by Mike Leigh)
- A Midsummer Night's Dream (William Shakespeare's popular play in a BBC production).
- The Adventures of Tintin
- Duckman
- Santo Bugito
