= Ramón Carande =

Spanish historian (1887–1986)

- Born: Ramón Carande Thovar; May 4, 1887; Palencia, Spain
- Died: 1 September 1986 (aged 99); Almendral (Badajoz), Spain
- Occupation: Historian

Ramón Carande Thovar (May 4, 1887 – September 1, 1986) was a Spanish historian.

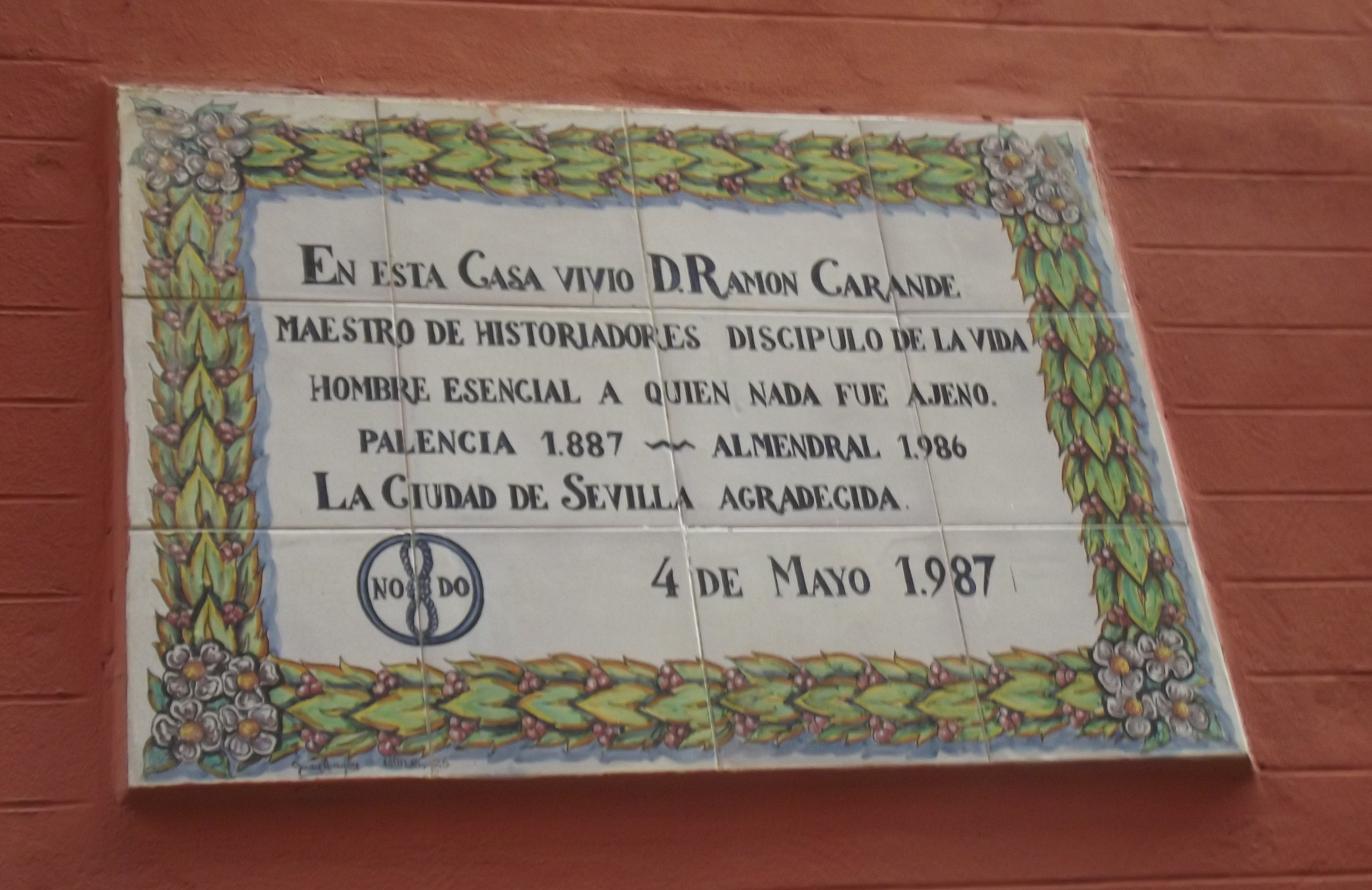
Ramón Carande plaque in Seville.

== Bibliography ==
- Spanish translation of Los principios filosóficos de la historia del derecho (1909, Pierre de Tourtoulon).
- Spanish translation of Los fundamentos teóricos del marxismo (1914, Mikhail Ivanovitch de Tougan-Baranouskii).
- The Bank of England cumple 252 años S/l, March 1946 (1946).
- La hacienda real de Castilla (1949).
- Larguezas de las Cortes (1518-1555) (1947).
- El crédito de Castilla y el precio de la política imperial (1949).
- Gobernantes y gobernados en la Hacienda de Castilla (1951).
- El Obispo, el Concejo y los Regidores de Palencia (1932).
- La economía y la expansión de España bajo el Gobierno de los Reyes Católicos (1952).
- La huella económica de las capitales hispano-musulmanas (1949).
- Carlos V y sus Banqueros, Barcelona : Crítica; Valladolid : Junta de Castilla y León (1949).
