= Eugenio d'Ors =

Spanish writer, philosopher, and art critic (1882–1954)

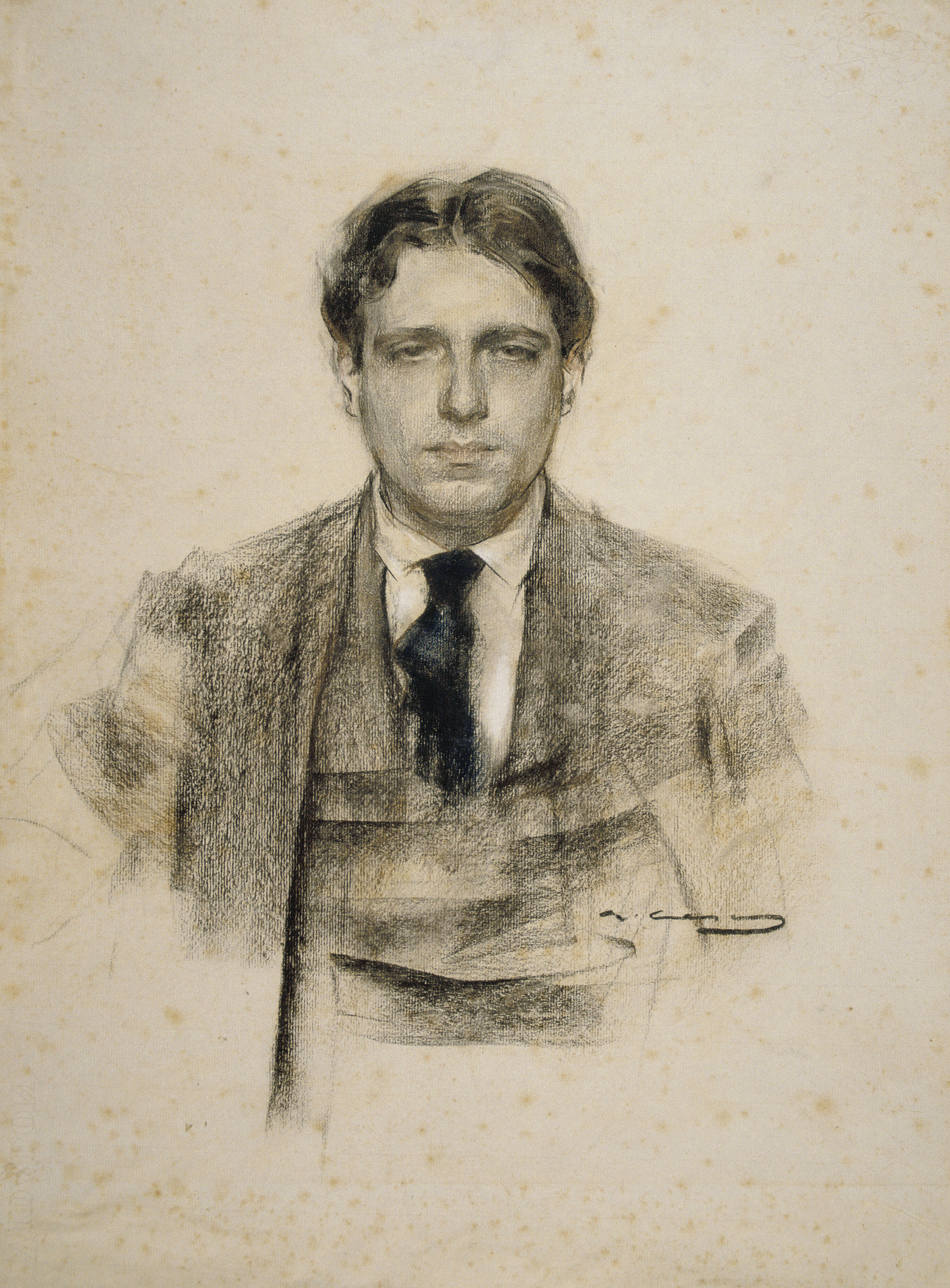
Eugenio d'Ors seen by Ramón Casas (MNAC)

Eugenio d'Ors Rovira (Barcelona, 28 September 1881 – Vilanova i la Geltrú, 25 September 1954), also known as Eugeni d'Ors, was a Spanish writer, essayist, journalist, philosopher and art critic. He wrote in both Catalan and Spanish, sometimes under the pseudonym of Xènius (pronounced [ˈʃɛnius]).

== Biography ==
Eugenio d'Ors was born in Barcelona in 1881, to Josep d'Ors, from Sabadell, and Celia Rovira, from Manzanillo, Cuba. His younger brother Josep Enric, born in 1883, was also a writer. Eugenio d'Ors married Maria Pérez Peix in 1906. D'Ors began his work in modernist literary environments, and his early work—between 19 and 25 years old—can be categorised as modernista. He studied law at the University of Barcelona and received his first PhD degree in Madrid in 1905. In 1913, he received his second doctorate, this time in philosophy.

Beginning in 1906, he collaborated with the newspaper La Veu de Catalunya and was a member of Catalan Noucentisme. He was the secretary of the Institut d'Estudis Catalans in 1911 and director of the Instrucció Pública de la Mancomunitat de Catalunya (Commonwealth of Catalonia) in 1917, but he left in 1920 after Enric Prat de la Riba's death. In 1923 he moved to Madrid where he became a member of the Real Academia Española in 1927.

Returning from France, he joined the Falange Española de las JONS in 1937. In 1938, during Spanish Civil War he was the General Director on Fine Arts in the Francoist provisional government in Burgos. A "hard-line fascist," he had both leftist and rightist friends among intellectuals and politicians, and got prisoners from the Second Spanish Republic released from Franco-era concentration camps.

He was the father of the noted Spanish jurist, historian and political theorist, Álvaro d'Ors, and the grandfather of Juan d'Ors.

== Works ==
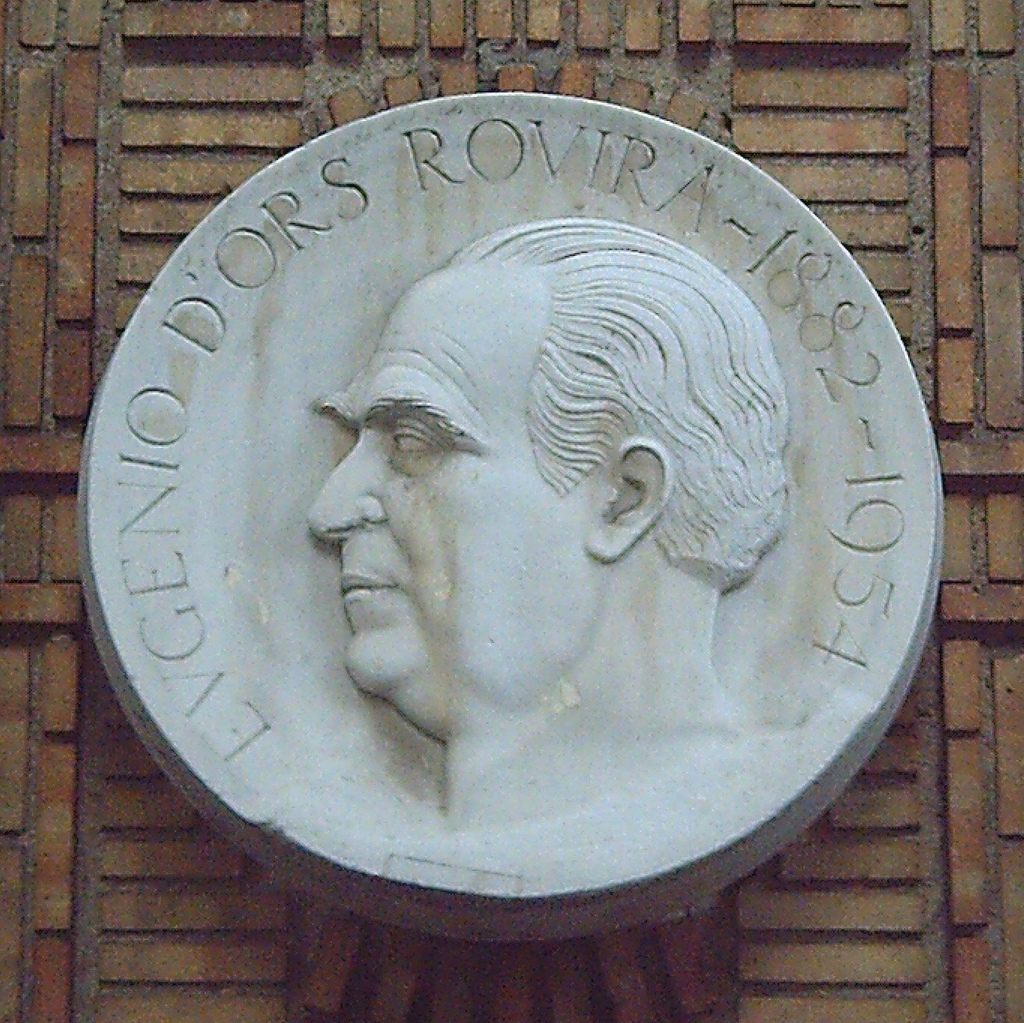
Medallion showing a profile relief of D'Ors, by F. Marés. Detail of the monument dedicated to him in Madrid (1963).

=== In Catalan ===
- La fi d'Isidre Nonell, 1902 (narració).
- Gloses de quaresma, 1911.
- La ben plantada, 1911.
- Gualba la de mil veus, 1911.
- Oceanografia del tedi, 1918.
- La vall de Josafat, 1918.
- Gloses de la vaga, 1919.

=== In Spanish ===
- Estudios de arte (1932)
- Introducción a la vida angélica. Cartas a una soledad, 1939
- Novísimo glosario (1946)
- El secreto de la filosofía, 1947
- La verdadera historia de Lidia de Cadaqués, 1954

== Bibliography ==
- Fusi, Juan Pablo (1999). Un siglo de España: la cultura. Marcial Pons.
- Gaya Nuño, Juan Antonio (1975). Historia de la crítica de arte en España. Ibérico Europea de Ediciones.
- Suárez Granda, Juan Luis (1996). El ensayo español del siglo XX (1900-1990). Akal.
