= Gabriel Celaya =

Spanish poet

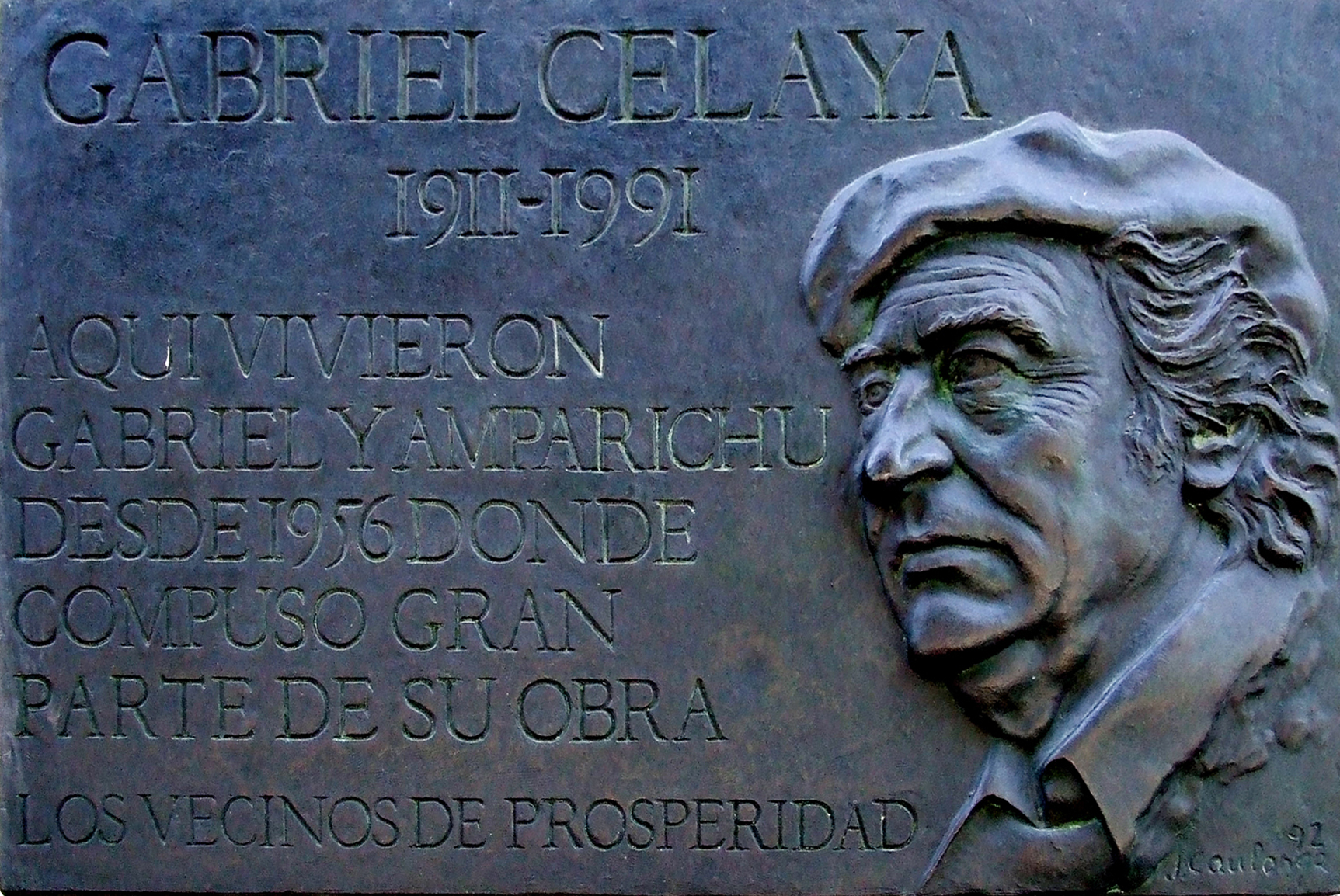
- Commemorative plaque at his Madrid residence
- Born: Rafael Gabriel Juan Múgica Celaya Leceta; March 18, 1911; Hernani, Gipuzkoa, Spain
- Died: April 18, 1991 (aged 80); Madrid, Spain
- Writing career
- Language: Spanish
- Period: 20th Century
- Genre: Poetry
- Notable work: Open World

Gabriel Celaya (full name: Rafael Gabriel Juan Múgica Celaya Leceta; March 18, 1911, in Hernani, Gipuzkoa – April 18, 1991, in Madrid) was a Spanish poet. Gabriel settled in Madrid and studied engineering, working for a time as a manager in his family's business.

Gabriel met Federico García Lorca, José Moreno Villa and other intellectuals who inspired him towards writing around 1927-1935, after which he devoted his writing entirely to poetry. In 1946 he founded the collection of the poems "Norte" with its inseparable Amparo Gastón and since then, he abandoned his engineering profession and his family's business.

The poetry collection "Norte" was intended to bridge between the gap of the poetry of the generation of 1927, the exile and Europe.

In 1946, he published the prose book "Tentativas" in which he signed as Gabriel Celaya for the first time. This is the first stage of existentialist character.

Along with Eugenio de Nora and Blas de Otero, he supported the idea of a non-elitist poetry in the service of the majority, "to transform the world".

In 1956, he won the Critics Award for his book "De claro en claro".

When this model of social poetry was in crisis, Celaya returned to his poetic origins. He published 'La linterna sorda' ('The lantern deaf') and reedited poems belonging prior to 1936. He also tested the experimentalism and concrete poetry 'Campos Semánticos'('semantic fields') (1971).

Between 1977 and 1980 their Obras Completas were published in five volumes. In 1986 he won a national prize for Spanish literature by the Ministry of Culture, the same year when he published “Open world”.

The work of Celaya is a synthesis of almost all the concerns and styles of Spanish poetry of 20th century.

Celaya died on April 18, 1991, in Madrid and his remains were scattered in his native Hernani.

== Works ==
Poetry

- Marea del silencio, 1935

- La soledad cerrada, 1947
- Movimientos elementales, 1947
- Tranquilamente hablando, 1947 (firmado como Juan de Leceta)
- Objetos poéticos, 1948
- El principio sin fín, 1949
- Se parece al amor, 1949
- Las cosas como son, 1949
- Deriva, Alicante, 1950
- Las cartas boca arriba, 1951
- Lo demás es silencio, 1952
- Paz y concierto, 1953
- Ciento volando (con Amparo Gastón), 1953
- Vía muerta, 1954
- La poesía es un arma cargada de futuro, 1954
- Cantos iberos, 1955
- Coser y cantar (con Amparo Gastón), 1955
- De claro en claro, 1956
- Entreacto, 1957
- Las resistencias del diamante, 1957
- Música celestial (con Amparo Gastón), 1958
- Cantata en Aleixandre, 1959
- El corazón en su sitio, 1959
- Para vosotros dos, 1960
- Poesía urgente, 1960
- La buena vida, 1961
- Los poemas de Juan de Leceta, 1961
- Rapsodia eúskara, 1961
- Episodios nacionales, 1962
- Mazorcas, 1962
- Versos de otoño, 1963
- Dos cantatas, 1963
- La linterna sorda, 1964
- Baladas y decires vascos, 1965
- Lo que faltaba, 1967
- Poemas de Rafael Múgica, 1967
- Los espejos transparentes, 1968
- Canto en lo mío, 1968
- Poesías completas, 1969
- Operaciones poéticas, 1971
- Campos semánticos, 1971
- Dirección prohibida, 1973
- Función de Uno, 1973
- El derecho y el revés, 1973
- La hija de Arbigorriya, 1975
- Buenos días, buenas noches, 1978
- Parte de guerra, 1977
- Poesías completas (Tomo I-VI), 1977-80
- Iberia sumergida, 1978
- Poemas órficos, 1981
- Penúltimos poemas, 1982
- Cantos y mitos, 1984
- Trilogía vasca, 1984
- El mundo abierto, 1986
- Orígenes / Hastapenak, 1990
- Poesías completas, 2001-04
Essays
- El arte como lenguaje, 1951
- Poesía y verdad, 1959
- Juan Manuel Caneja, 1959
- Exploración de la poesía, 1964
- Castilla, a cultural reader (con Phyllis Turnbull), 1960
- Inquisición de la poesía, 1972
- La voz de los niños, 1972
- Bécquer, 1972
- Los espacios de Chillida, 1974
- Lo que faltaba de Gabriel Celaya, 1984
- Reflexiones sobre mi poesía, 1987
- Ensayos literarios, 2009
Prose
- Taradez, 4003
- Tentativas, 1946
- Lázaro calla, 1949
- Penúltimas tentativas, 1960
- Lo uno y lo otro, 1962
- Los buenos negocios, 1965
- Memorias inmemoriales, 1980
Drama
- El relevo, 1963
- Ritos y farsas. Obra teatral completa, 1985
