= Victoriano Crémer =

Victoriano Crémer (18 December 1906 – 27 June 2009) was a Spanish poet, journalist and "official chronicler of the city of León, Spain." The Latin American Herald Tribune described Cremer as Spain's "longest lived poet" in 2009.

Crémer, born in Burgos, co-founded the literary magazine Espadaña (Bell Tower) with Gonzalez de Lama and Eugenio de Nora during the height of the Spanish Civil War. The magazine published work by poets including Blas de Otero, César Vallejo and Pablo Neruda.

Some of Crémer's best known works include Tiempo de Soledad (Time of Solitude), Nuevos Cantos de Vida y Esperanza (New Songs of Life and Hope), and Libro de Cain (The Book of Cain). Crémer won a Jaime Gil de Biedma Poetry Prize in 2008 for his writing, El Ultimo Jinete (The Last Horseman).

Crémer was admitted to a hospital in León in June 2009. He died aged 102 in León, Spain, on 27 June 2009, due to complications of old age.

Spanish Prime Minister José Luis Rodríguez Zapatero, himself a resident of León, issued a condolence message in which he expressed "deep sorrow" and applauded Cremer, whose literature guided Spain during "some very tough times in our history." Zapatero called Crémer a "cultural activist."
