= Monument to Eugenio d'Ors (Madrid) =

Monument in Granada

Eugenio d'Ors Rovira
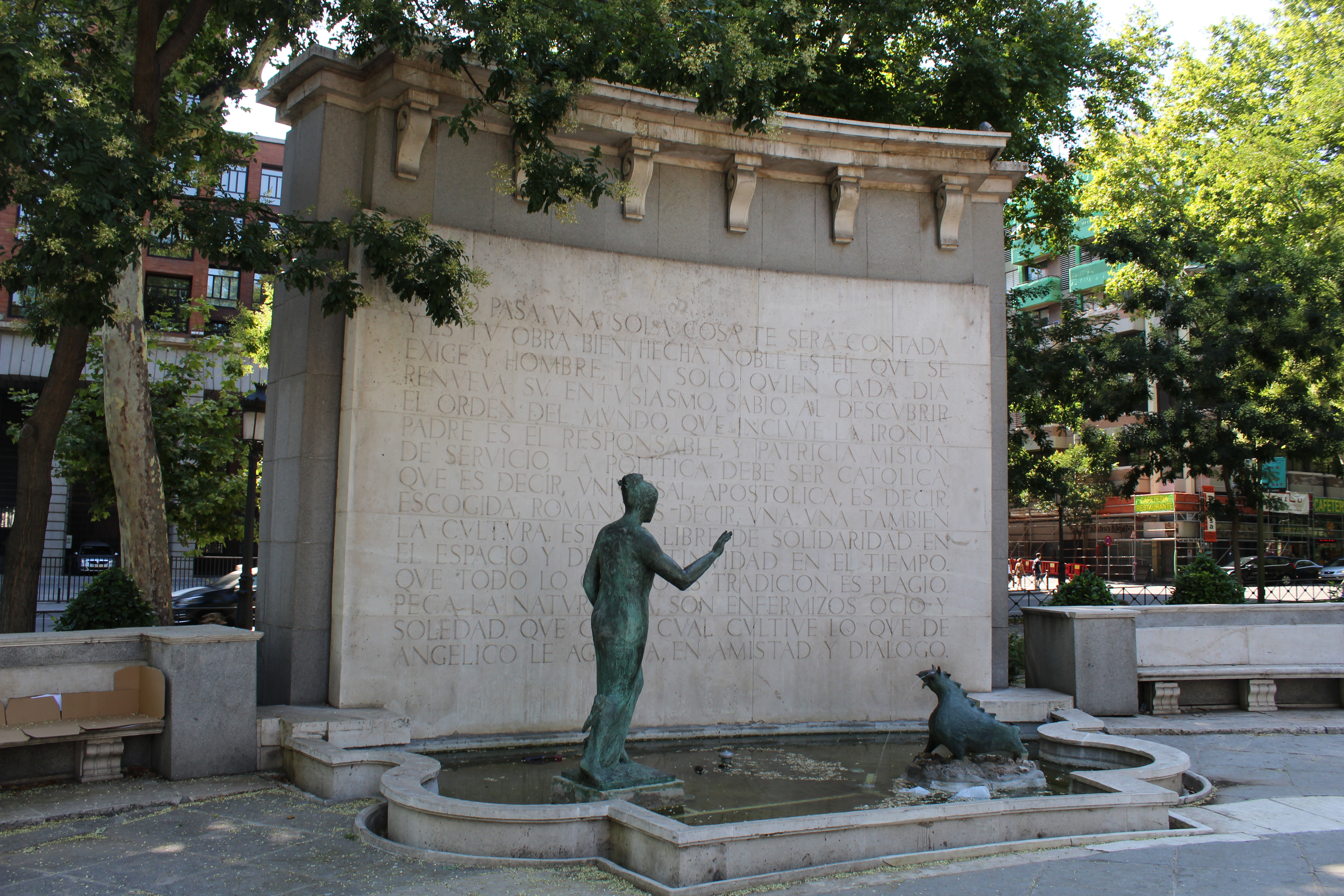
- Location: Paseo del Prado, Madrid, Spain
- Coordinates: 40.413628°N 3.693547°W
- Designer: Víctor d'Ors; Cristino Mallo; Federico Marés
- Material: Bronze, granite, limestone, brick
- Opening date: July 1963
- Dedicated to: Eugenio d'Ors

The Monument to Eugenio d'Ors Rovira is an instance of public art in Madrid, Spain. Dedicated to Eugenio d'Ors—noted Catalan writer, art critic and Francoist intellectual—it consists of a sculptural group put inside a fountain and a commemorative wall displaying a relief of d'Ors. It lies at the middle of the Paseo del Prado, facing both the Casa Sindical and the Prado Museum.

== History and description ==
The project of the monument was authored by Víctor d'Ors, son of Eugenio. The front side of the monument facing the Prado Museum displays a bronze sculptural group emerging from a fountain; it consists of a female allegory (designed by Cristino Mallo) stopping a four-legged creature variously described as a "small dragon", a "pet stegosaurus" or a "baroque and spontaneous eruption".

The granite wall features a long inscription, with a compilation of aphorisms summarising the opinions of the honoured author on Life and Aesthetics.

Aside from a stone medallion designed by Federico Marés with the effigy of d'Ors and his birth and death dates, the back side facing the Casa Sindical displays an inscription reading: "a la memoria del magisterio orsiano. en mcmlxiii dedica madrid esta fuente siendo alcalde el xvi conde de mayalde" ("To the memory of the Orsian teachings. Madrid dedicates this fountain in 1963 being mayor the 16th Count of Mayalde).

It was unveiled in July 1963.

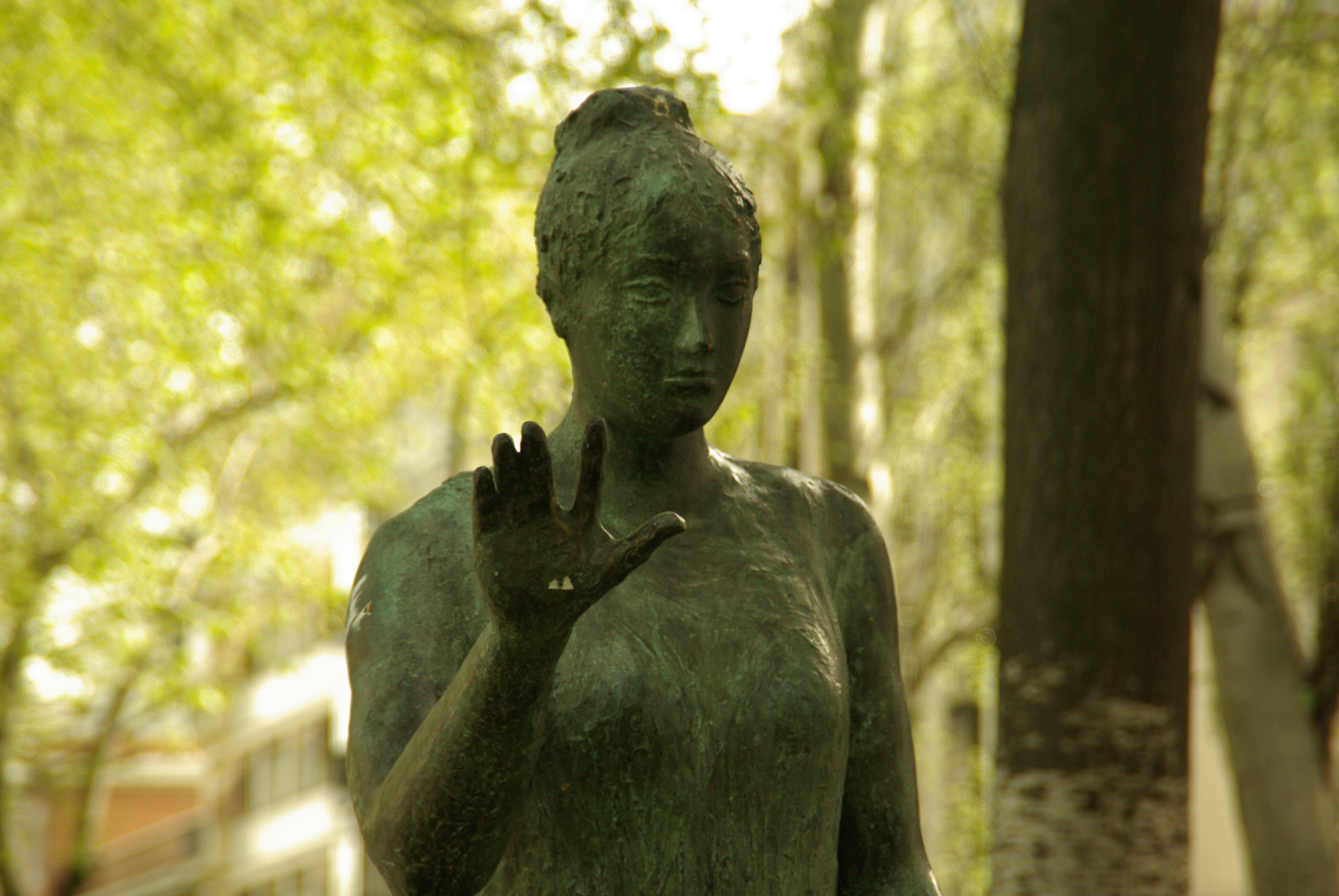
The female allegory

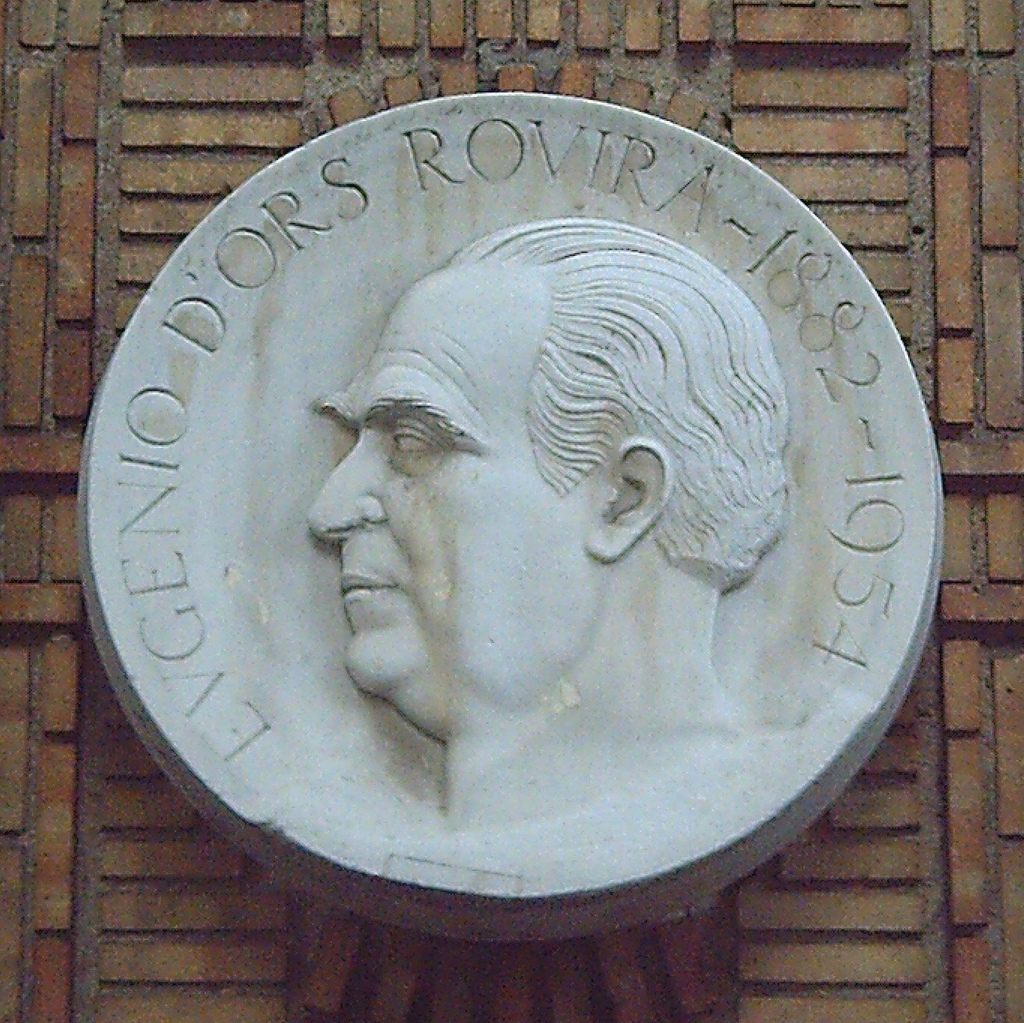
The back side medallion

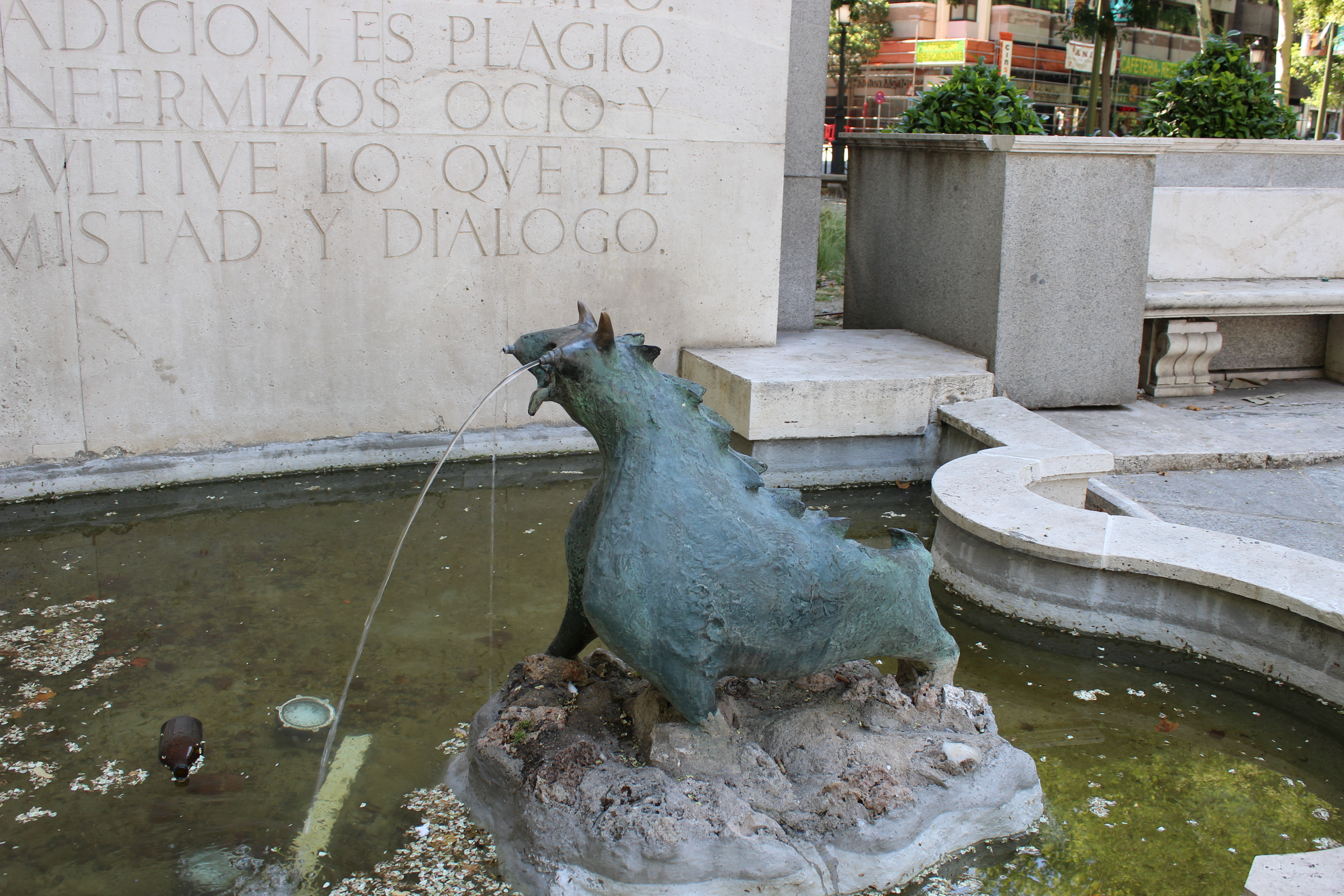
The creature
