= Blas de Otero =

Spanish poet

- Born: 15 March 1916; Bilbao, Spain
- Died: 29 June 1979 (aged 63); Madrid, Spain

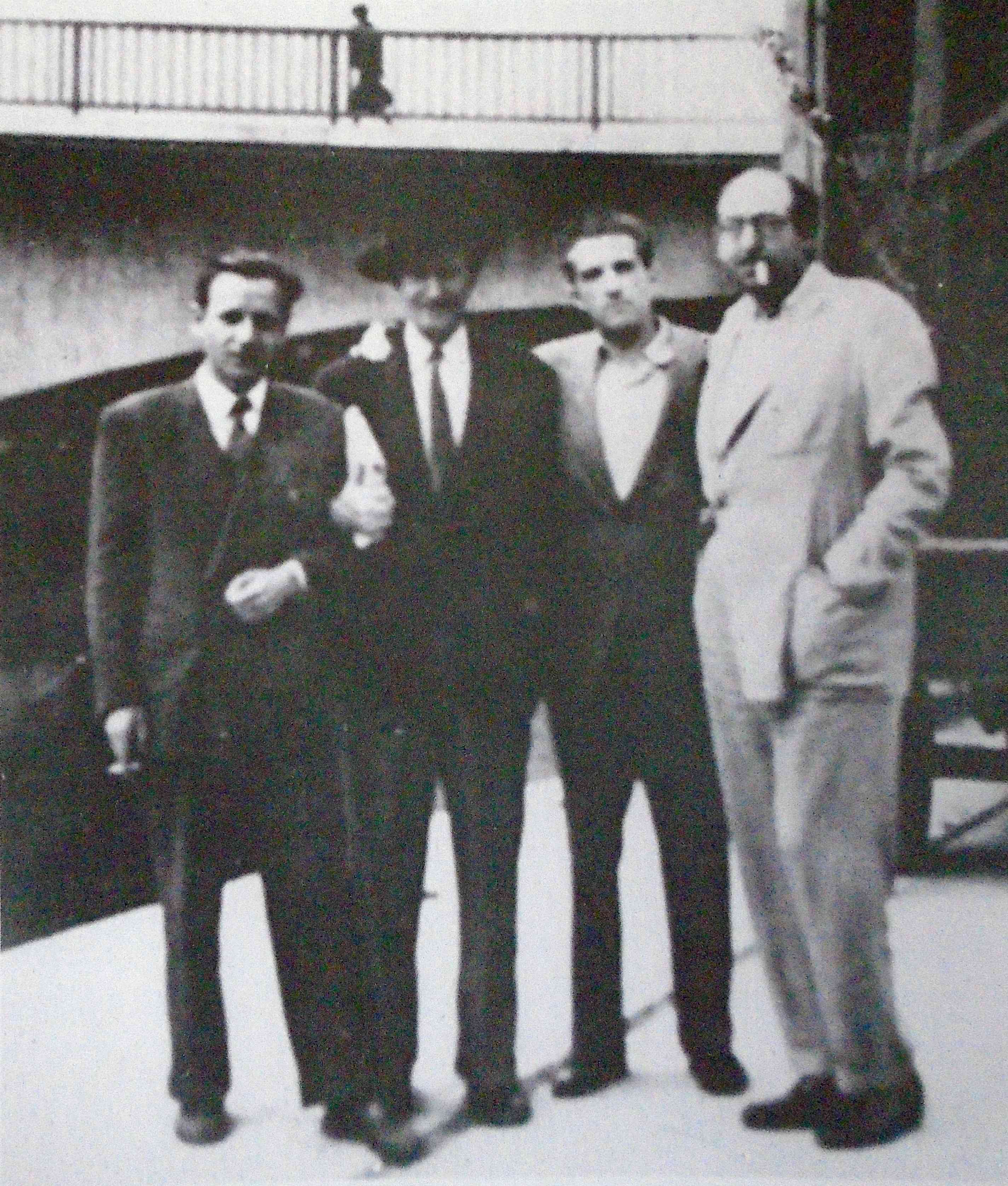
Otero second from right.

Blas de Otero (15 March 1916 – 29 June 1979) was a Spanish poet, associated with the Social poetry movement of the 1950s and 60s in Spain.
