= Postism =

Spanish literary and artistic movement

Postism (in Spanish Postismo) was a marginal literary and artistic movement whose name is a contraction of postsurrealismo ("post-surrealism"). As stated in the Second Manifesto, published in La Estafeta Literaria (special issue, 1946) and signed by Eduardo Chicharro Briones, Carlos Edmundo de Ory, and Silvano Sernesi.

The term was initially meant to signify "the -ism that comes after all -isms." with this denomination, the authors sought to express that their movement represented the synthesis of all previous avant-garde movements.

== Members ==
In Spain, alongside the Catalan movement Dau al set and the Aragonese group Pórtico, Postism was one of the few movements to embrace European avant-gardes after the Spanish Civil War.

It was mainly led by Carlos Edmundo de Ory (1923–2010) and Eduardo Chicharro Briones (1905–1964). Among its members at various times were Francisco Nieva (1924–2016), Ángel Crespo (1926–1995), Gloria Fuertes (1917–1998), Antonio Fernández Molina (1927–2005), Fernando Arrabal (born 1932), Antonio Beneyto (1934–2020), Gabino-Alejandro Carriedo (1923–1981), José Fernández-Arroyo (1928–2019), Félix Casanova de Ayala (1915–1990), Federico Muelas (1910–1974), Jesús Juan Garcés (1917–1983), and Carlos de la Rica (1929–1997).

== Origins ==
Postism arose in Madrid in 1945 and remained active until around 1950. The publication of the Third Manifesto of Postism (1947) likely marked the beginning of its decline, brought on by literary incomprehension and ideological rigidity. The movement drew clear inspiration from French avant-garde currents such as Dada, from which Surrealism emerged. Silvano Sernesi, influenced by Futurism during his time in Rome, also shaped its outlook.

Cubist literature was not foreign to them either—Postists regarded it as a point already surpassed. They sought to go beyond Dadaism, Surrealism, and social poetry. Carlos Edmundo de Ory described the movement as “controlled madness” in contrast to the Surrealist “automatic writing.”

The Postist tradition has deep roots. Its anti-canonical, paradoxically counterfactual stance draws from the verbal ingenuity of the Baroque period and the playful pastiche of eighteenth-century satire. It continues through the eccentric and humorous spirit of nineteenth-century writers such as Ros de Olano and Miguel de los Santos Álvarez, linking later to the esperpento of Ramón María del Valle-Inclán and the greguería style of Ramón Gómez de la Serna.

From the interwar avant-gardes, Postism also inherited the absurd and surreal humour of authors like humorist Tono, Miguel Mihura, Carlos Arniches, and Enrique Jardiel Poncela, as well as the playful tone of magazines such as Bertoldo, La Ametralladora, and La Codorniz. It celebrated invented words over catalogued ones and cultivated linguistic playfulness, echoing works of ludolinguistics such as Esfuerzos del ingenio literario (Madrid, 1890) by León Carbonero y Sol and Rarezas literarias by Eduardo de Ory—the father of Carlos Edmundo de Ory—whose collection of extravagant literary pieces inspired his son’s Postist sensibility.

== Manifestos and magazines ==
Four Postist manifestos were published. The first appeared in Postismo, no. 1 (Madrid, 1945). The second was published in a special issue of La Estafeta Literaria (Madrid, 1946). The third was printed in El Minuto, supplement of La Hora (no. 1, second series, Madrid, 1947). These three were later transcribed by Félix Grande in Carlos Edmundo de Ory, Puesta 1945–1969 (Barcelona: Edhasa, 1970). The fourth and final manifesto appeared in Gonzalo Armero’s edition of Eduardo Chicharro’s Música celestial y otros poemas (Madrid: Semanarios y Ediciones, 1974).

Main publications included Postismo and La Cerbatana (both financed by Silvano Sernesi), El Pájaro de Paja, and Jueves Postista, a supplement of the Lanza newspaper in Ciudad Real.

== Poetics ==
Postism influenced both visual arts and literature. In poetry, it opposed the dominant trends identified by Dámaso Alonso as rooted poetry and uprooted poetry. The movement sought to synthesize prewar avant-gardes into a kind of proto-neodadaism, rejecting all dogmatism.

According to José Manuel Polo Bernabé, its main principles were:

1. Supremacy of imagination dependent on both the subconscious and reason.
2. Use of sensory materials.
3. A playful, Dionysian, and humorous character.
4. Technical control that includes exploration of linguistic possibilities—perhaps its main distinction from other avant-garde movements.
5. A desire to destroy prejudice.

These principles were outlined in the first Manifesto:

"The result of a profound and semi-confused movement of subconscious mechanisms, touched by us in direct or indirect synchrony (memory) with the sensory elements of the external world, through which imagination—exalted automatically but always joyfully—becomes captured to provide the sensation of beauty, or beauty itself, contained within technical norms of such nature that no kind of civic, historical, or academic prejudice can restrain imaginative impulse."

In 1946, Carlos Edmundo de Ory defined Postism as “invented madness”, while Eduardo Chicharro Briones called it a “cult of nonsense”. Gabino-Alejandro Carriedo described it in 1949 as:

"a state of mind, a way of being, an aspect of art and nature [...] pure sensation exploited scientifically and consciously. Postism is the intimate delight of the gods."

== Centers of diffusion ==
Postism was primarily centered in Madrid and Ciudad Real, where many Castilian-La Mancha poets—including Ángel Crespo, Francisco Nieva, Antonio Fernández Molina, José Fernández-Arroyo, Carlos de la Rica, and Federico Muelas—joined the movement. Fundamental publications like El Pájaro de Paja and Jueves Postista were produced there.

== Evolution ==
In his work No es un sueño (Diario: 1954–2006), José Fernández-Arroyo described Postism as originating from photographic experiments organized in the 1930s by his friends Gregorio Prieto and Eduardo Chicharro Briones while they were fellows at the Spanish Academy in Rome.

Chicharro, a painter and avid photographer, created photo montages using Roman ruins and statues, with Prieto as a model. Half-jokingly, he dubbed his style "postist", suggesting a tendency beyond the last dominant "-ism"—French Surrealism.

Years later, after returning to Madrid, Chicharro met Carlos Edmundo de Ory and Silvano Sernesi, and together they launched the movement through the magazine Postismo, which included the first Manifesto accompanied by a photograph from the Rome series.

The authorities quickly banned the magazine as subversive, leading them to publish La Cerbatana, which met the same fate. Later, Gabino-Alejandro Carriedo and Ángel Crespo produced the small magazine El Pájaro de Paja, where Postism survived precariously until the Second Manifesto appeared in La Estafeta Literaria (1946) and the Third Manifesto in El Minuto (1947), addressed to students in an attempt to rally youth support.

Although these manifestos did not establish a solidly structured movement, Postism experienced a brief period of vitality among its founders, soon joined by Ángel Crespo, Gabino-Alejandro Carriedo, Félix Casanova de Ayala, Antonio Fernández Molina, and Carlos de la Rica. Only their collective works—and those of Carlos Edmundo de Ory and Eduardo Chicharro Briones—can truly be considered Postist. Later adherents, such as Fernando Arrabal, maintained distant affinities with its unorthodox spirit.

According to Jaume Pont, journals such as El Pájaro de Paja, Deucalión, and Doña Endrina—under Carriedo, Crespo, and Fernández Molina—carried forward the Postist legacy. He also notes its reflection in Fernando Arrabal’s early plays (Pic-Nic, El cementerio de automóviles) and especially in Francisco Nieva’s "furious theatre" and "theatre of farce and calamity", which incorporated Postist themes such as carnival imagery, grotesque irrationality, and the magical triad of "absurdity, madness, and nonsense" celebrated by Chicharro, Ory, and Sernesi.

Postism’s influence can be traced in later authors such as José Luis Castillejo, Juan Eduardo Cirlot, the visual poetry movement, and the experimental Zaj group. A later revival, known as Neopostism, was led by Carlos de la Rica through the poetic collective La Camama with José del Saz Orozco, Manuel San Martín, Carlos Asorey, and Luis Lloret, supported by their small press El Toro de Barro, founded in 1965 and active through the 1980s.

== Additional sources ==
- Jaume Pont, El Postismo: Un movimiento estético-literario de vanguardia (Barcelona: Ed. del Mall, 1987).
- Jaume Pont, "Postismo, la brujería de la palabra", El Cultural, supplement of El Mundo, 27 June 1999.
- R. Herrero "Claudio", Antología de la poesía postista (Zaragoza, 1998).
- F. Casanova, "Anecdotario y teoría del Postismo", Papeles de Son Armadans, no. 106 (1964).
- Amador Palacios, Jueves postistas: El papel de Ciudad Real en el Postismo. Los artículos de "Lanza" (Ciudad Real: Diputación, 1991).
- M. I. Navas Ocaña, El Postismo (Cuenca: El Toro de Barro, 2000).
- Diego Vadillo López, "El Postismo. Un legado a reivindicar", Encima de la Niebla, no. 55 (June 2, 2024).
