= María Ontiveros =

María García-Ontiveros y Herrera
- Born: Venezuela
- Died: November 1956; Madrid, Spain
- Occupations: Poet, Politician
- Notable work: Remanso (1933); Agua de mar (1951)

María García-Ontiveros y Herrera (born in Venezuela – died in Madrid, November 1956), known in literary circles as María Ontiveros, was a Spanish poet and politician, and a member of the literary circle Versos con faldas.

== Biography ==
She belonged to a family of diplomats, which explains her birth in Venezuela.

In 1933 she published Remanso, which included a poem dedicated to Concha Espina. The book was well received by critics, and Espina herself wrote the epilogue, praising Ontiveros with the words:

"This collection of rhymes is a promise of a fertile literary harvest."

After the Spanish Civil War, she obtained a prominent position within the Sección Femenina as Central Overseer of the Foreign Service. She also held a post in the Youth Organizations. Issue no. 48 of Revista para la Mujer (January 1942) featured a report on the work of the Sección Femenina within the Falange movement, but her greatest international exposure came during a 1943 trip to Berlin with Pilar Primo de Rivera (daughter of the dictator Miguel Primo de Rivera).

In 1947 she was honored by the Association of Spanish Writers and Artists, an event covered in the press of the time. In 1948 her poem "Alma gris" ("Gray Soul") appeared in the magazine Verbo, where she identified herself with nature following the Romantic topos.

Ontiveros was an active participant in the Spanish cultural life of the 1940s and 1950s. She took part in a session devoted to Juana de Ibarbourou at the poetry circle Alforjas para la Poesía, held at Madrid's Teatro Lara in April 1949. She also participated in tributes to Rubén Darío and Bécquer in 1950 and 1951.

Her second poetry collection, Agua de mar (“Sea Water”), appeared in 1951 with a foreword by José María Pemán, who praised her command of rhythm and rhyme.

In June 1955 she took part, together with Clemencia Laborda, in a tribute to Concha Espina organized at the Mesa de Burgos in Madrid. She contributed to various magazines in Spain and Latin America, especially Semana y Teatro.

María Ontiveros died in Madrid in November 1956.

== Participation in Versos con faldas ==
She took part in the third recital of the poetry circle, held on 16 April 1951, alongside María Isabel Secades, María Dolores de Pablos, Margarita Uribarri, Adelaida Las Santas, Clemencia Laborda, Gloria Fuertes, Alfonsa de la Torre, Ángela Figuera Aymerich, Carmen Conde, and Concha Suárez de Otero. The session was presented by Argentinian poet and art critic Ernesto B. Rodríguez.

In Adelaida Las Santas's novel Versos de café, where the author recalls her fellow members of the circle, Ontiveros is described as a highly admired reciter.

== Recognition ==
The poetry contest "Su terraza", created in 1958 at the initiative of Elisa Soriano Fisher and Guadalupe García de Quevedo, included an award named in her honor. The prize went to the poet María Antonia de Ibarra, another participant in the literary gathering Versos con faldas.

== Works ==
- 1933 – Remanso, with an epilogue by Concha Espina
- 1951 – Agua de mar, with a foreword by José María Pemán
