= Adelaida Las Santas =

Spanish journalist

Adelaida Las Santas Loureiro
- Adelaida Las Santas Loureiro, c. 1950s
- Born: July 22, 1918; Villarejo de Salvanés, Community of Madrid, Spain
- Died: November 15, 2006 (aged 88); Madrid, Spain
- Occupations: Journalist, poet
- Known for: Co-founder of the literary circle Versos con faldas
- Notable work: Versos con faldas; Poemas de Adelaida
- Spouse: Guillermo Osorio (m. 1955–1982; his death)

Adelaida Las Santas Loureiro (Villarejo de Salvanés, 22 July 1918 – Madrid, 15 November 2006) was a Spanish journalist, poet, and co-founder of the literary gathering Versos con faldas.

== Biography ==
=== Early age ===
She was born in Villarejo de Salvanés (Madrid), but moved to the capital of Spain at a very young age.

=== Life during Spanish Civil War ===
In August 1936 she remained living in Madrid, and she helped her friend, the Falangist Luis Carmona, who had escaped from the Modelo prison.

On 4 September, anarchist militiamen from the FAI showed up at her home to arrest her for helping him, but Las Santas refused to cooperate. Despite her denial, Carmona was arrested and disappeared.

=== After the war ===
In 1950 she earned a degree in Journalism and began writing for various newspapers in Madrid. At the same time, she wrote poetry which she presented at several literary gatherings that were common at the time. In April 1950 she participated in the tribute to Emilio Carrere. In 1951 she created the literary circle ‘‘Versos con faldas’’ together with Gloria Fuertes and María Dolores de Pablos, acting as secretary. She took part in numerous recitals, either alone or accompanied by some of her colleagues from the group.

=== Marriage ===
In 1955 she married the writer Guillermo Osorio (1918–1982), who, according to Mery Varona, was:

"Guillermo was a bohemian and “cursed” writer. He had taken part in the war in a tank unit of the Republican army. Later, he went through French prisoner camps and through Spanish prisons and concentration camps. In 1950 he settled in Madrid, where he drifted from tavern to literary gathering, writing short stories and sonnets, a member of the so-called “ethylic generation” of Café Varela, where his friends—Manuel Alcántara, Eduardo Alonso, Alejandro Carriedo, Manuel Martínez Remis—met. That’s how Adelaida found him, took charge of him, sheltered him, and tried to put some order in his life, as much as Guillermo allowed, which was not much."

Las Santas was responsible for publishing her husband’s work, not only during his lifetime but also after his death, releasing two posthumous poetry collections.

=== Posterior links with literature and death ===
Throughout her life she remained closely linked to literature: in April 1957 and May 1960 she participated in two recitals at the Centro Asturiano with some of her "Versos con faldas" colleagues. In 1957 she took part in the sixth Saturday of Galerías Cascorro, along with Gloria Clavo, María Paz Viloria and Acacia Uceta. The following year, she also took part in the twentieth Saturday of the same literary circle, held in March. She gave lectures and directed a sonnet series at the Ateneo.

In 1959 she directed ‘‘Aguacantos,’’ a poetic gathering she described as an “oral newspaper.”

Adelaida Las Santas died in Madrid on 15 November 2006.

== Versos con faldas ==
In the poetry circle she founded with Gloria Fuertes and María Dolores de Pablos, Las Santas served as secretary, but in practice she acted as director, since Gloria Fuertes—the nominal director—fully trusted her:

"I value your drive, your energy and will. I’ll help by giving you the completed programs so you can notify the people.” She was the one who financed the programs and effectively managed the gathering. The group came to an end in 1953 when the General Directorate of Security banned poetry readings and café gatherings".

In 1983 she published the first anthology of "Versos con faldas." Years later, in 2019, based on Las Santas’ previous work, the publishing house Torremozas released another anthology that included introductory studies, biographies of the members, period photographs, and more.

== Works ==
=== Poetry ===
- Destellos. Madrid, self-published, 1950.
- Poemas de Adelaida. Madrid, Rumbos, 1954.
- Versos con faldas: (A brief history of a literary gathering founded by women in 1951). Madrid, Aguacantos, 1983.
- Y hace cincuenta años hubo una guerra: romance para que lo cante un ciego. Aguacantos, 1984.
- Poemas de la sinceridad. Madrid, self-published, 1997.

=== Children's literature ===
- Poema de la perra gorda que se convirtió en perra chica y otros poemas para las niñas y niños de Cuenca. Aguacantos, 1997.

=== Prose ===
- Poetas de café. Madrid, Cultura Clásica y Moderna, 1959.
