= Valerie Miles =

American-Spanish publisher, writer and translator

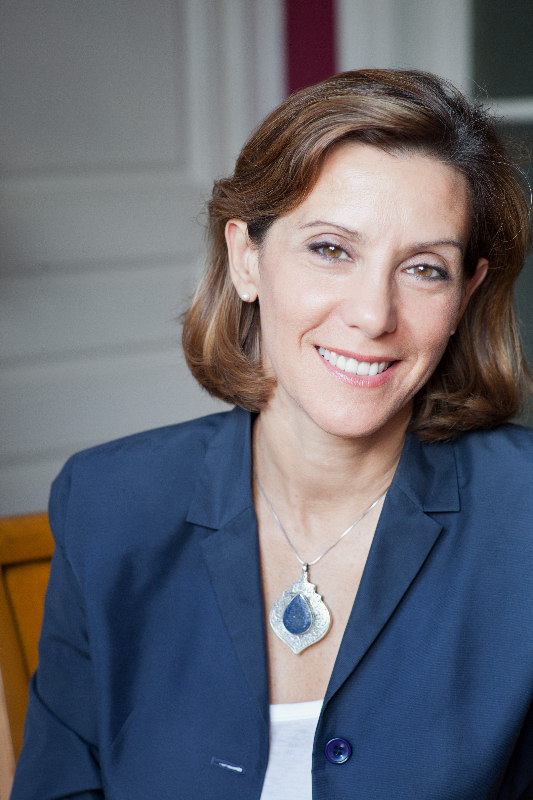
- Photo by Nina Subin
- Born: 1963 (age 62–63); New York
- Occupations: Editor, translator, scholar, writer
- Writing career
- Language: English and Spanish

Valerie Miles (born 1963) is an American editor, translator, writer, and scholar based in Barcelona, Spain. She is the co-founder and director of Granta en español and editor of the Prado Fiction Collection at the Museo Nacional del Prado. She has held editorial positions at major Spanish publishing houses, worked extensively with Roberto Bolaño's literary archive, and translated numerous Spanish-language authors into English.

== Career ==
=== Writing ===
Miles has published essays, literary criticism, and interviews in La Vanguardia, ABC, La Nación, Reforma, El País, The New Yorker, The Paris Review, Granta, The New York Times, Harper's, and Literary Hub. She has also contributed essays about literature and the visual arts to Cuadernos Hispanoamericanos and Fundación MAPFRE.

Miles also writes fiction. Her short story "Bringing Down the Moon," set in Barcelona's Gràcia neighborhood, appeared in the anthology Barcelona Noir (Akashic Books, 2011).

Since 2021, Miles has coordinated "Correspondencias" for Cuadernos Hispanoamericanos, featuring epistolary exchanges between contemporary Spanish and Latin American writers.

=== Translation ===
Miles has translated works by numerous Spanish- and Catalan-language authors into English for imprints including New Directions, Archipelago Books, NYRB Classics, and Yale University Press. She translated the first English-language edition of A Dictionary of Symbols, a reference book by Catalan poet and polymath Juan Eduardo Cirlot that illuminates the symbolic underpinnings of myth, modern psychology, literature, and art (NYRB Classics, 2020). Other translation projects include English-language translations of Adolfo Bioy Casares's Borges, a diaristic portrait of the writer's friendship with Jorge Luis Borges (NYRB Classics, 2025), and Edgardo Cozarinsky's Milongas, an exploration of tango around the globe. She has collaborated with Spanish writer Enrique Vila-Matas as the translator of his novella Because She Never Asked (New Directions, 2015), as well as his novel Camera Obscura (Yale University Press, 2026).

=== Publishing ===
Miles began her publishing career in 1999 as an editor at Debolsillo, part of Random House Spain. In 2001, she became publishing director of Emecé Editores (Grupo Planeta), where she acquired and edited Spanish editions of international and Spanish-language writers including John Cheever, Richard Yates, Yasunari Kawabata, and Joyce Carol Oates. She subsequently served as the director of the International Fiction Series of Alfaguara (Grupo Santillana), where she founded the New York Review of Books's collection of Spanish-language contemporary classics. She also developed and edited the English-language edition of Azar Nafisi's That Other World: Nabokov and the Puzzle of Exile.

Since 2022, Miles has edited the Prado Fiction Collection at the Museo Nacional del Prado and served as chair of the selection committee for the Writing the Prado Fellowship. She also directs the museum's Literary Conversations at the Prado series, featuring writers such as John Banville, Olga Tokarczuk, Mathias Enard, J. M. Coetzee, Leila Slimani, and Vladimir Sorokin. She serves on the editorial board of Yale University Press's Margellos collection.

=== Granta en español ===
Miles founded Granta en español with Aurelio Major in 2003. The Spanish-language edition of the British literary magazine was the first of Granta's international editions. Since its founding, the magazine has published 26 issues, most recently Granta 26: Centroamérica.

Miles has directed Granta en español since its founding. Among the magazine's best-known projects are its selections of the Best of Young Spanish-Language Novelists, first published in 2010 and again in 2021. Both selections were later adapted into issues of the English-language Granta. The first selection became Granta 113 (2010), the first issue of the English edition translated entirely from another language. Granta en Español has also published Spanish-language editions of the English-language Granta's 2007 and 2017 selections of the Best of Young American Novelists. Under Miles's editorial direction, Granta en español has published original fiction, essays, reportage, and literary translation.

=== Roberto Bolaño Archive ===
In 2008, Carolina López invited Miles to help evaluate and organize Roberto Bolaño's literary archive during the preparation of the exhibition Archivo Bolaño: 1977–2003 at the Centre de Cultura Contemporània de Barcelona (CCCB). The exhibition, which opened in 2013, presented manuscripts, notebooks, correspondence, and other archival materials documenting Bolaño's literary career, and later traveled to Buenos Aires and Madrid. Over the next eight years, she edited three posthumous novels by Bolaño for publication: El Tercer Reich, Los sinsabores del verdadero policía, and El espíritu de la ciencia ficción. Her work in the archive later formed the basis of her doctoral research at Pompeu Fabra University.

=== Books ===
Miles authored A Thousand Forests in One Acorn (Open Letter, 2014), an anthology of conversations between herself and 28 Spanish-language writers. Drawing on her years at Alfaguara, the book includes interviews with authors such as Javier Marías, Mario Vargas Llosa, Carlos Fuentes, Juan Goytisolo, and Antonio Muñoz Molina. Each section opens with a biographical introduction by Miles, followed by an interview in which the author discusses the work they consider their finest and the influences that shaped their writing.

A 2023 conversation between Miles and Nobel Prize-winning author J. M. Coetzee at the Centre de Cultura Contemporània de Barcelona was later published as the bilingual Catalan/English book Europa i el Món de Fora. Conversa entre J.M. Coetzee i Valerie Miles / Europe and the Outside World. Dialogue between J.M. Coetzee and Valerie Miles. The discussion addressed topics such as the representation of Europe in extra-European literature, Russia's place inside and outside Europe, and the spread of English as a world language.

=== Academic Career and Research ===
Miles earned her Ph.D. in Comparative Literature and Art under the supervision of Victoria Cirlot from Pompeu Fabra University. Her doctoral dissertation, Roberto Bolaño's Visual Imagination: A Poetics of the Eye, examined the role of visual aesthetics in Bolaño's literary works and was publicly defended on January 10, 2025.

Miles teaches literary translation and creative writing at Pompeu Fabra University in Barcelona, where she serves as a professor in the postgraduate literary translation program. She has also taught in the Master's Degree in Arts and Cultural Management at the International University of Catalonia.

=== Public Engagements ===
Miles has participated in public conversations with writers including J. M. Coetzee and Anne Carson at the Centre de Cultura Contemporània de Barcelona. She has delivered lectures and participated in literary conferences at institutions including Harvard University, the University of Cambridge, the University of Bucharest, and Brown University.

== Awards and Honors ==
- Named one of the Buenos Aires International Book Fair's most influential professionals in publishing (2013)
- PEN Translates Prize for Milena Busquets's This Too Shall Pass (2015)
- National Endowment for the Arts Literature Translation Fellowship (2020)
- McGinnis-Ritchie Award for Nonfiction (Southwest Review, 2023)
- BBK Gutun Zuria Honorary Prize for Cultural Mediation, Intellectual and Creative Pursuits (2026)

== Bibliography ==
- Mil bosques en una bellota (2012)
- A Thousand Forests in One Acorn (2014)
- Europa i el Món de Fora. Conversa entre J.M. Coetzee i Valerie Miles / Europe and the Outside World. Dialogue between J.M. Coetzee and Valerie Miles (2023)
