= Sagrario Torres =

María del Sagrario Torres Calderón
- Sagrario Torres
- Born: March 8, 1922; Valdepeñas, Ciudad Real, Spain
- Died: March 5, 2006 (aged 83); Madrid, Spain
- Occupation: Poet
- Known for: Religious and introspective poetry; member of the women's literary circle Versos con faldas
- Notable work: "Hormigón translúcido" (1970), "Poemas de La Diana" (1993)
- Movement: Postwar Spanish poetry
- Children: Francisco Javier Torres Calderón
- Awards: Concha Espina Prize (1942); Regional Merit Plaque of Castilla-La Mancha (2005)

María del Sagrario Torres Calderón (Valdepeñas, March 8, 1922 – Madrid, March 5, 2006) was a Spanish poet.

== Career ==
She was the daughter of Valdepeñas natives José Torres Montiel, a carpenter of Andalusian descent, and Mónica Calderón Rubio. She was orphaned of her father at a very young age and moved with her mother and brother to Madrid, At the age of five she entered a municipal boarding school run by nuns in Alcalá de Henares. Her secondary studies were interrupted by the Spanish Civil War; she never resumed them and completed her education on her own. While in Madrid, she began to write poetry and prose and, during the 1940s, collaborated with newspapers and magazines.

She received the Concha Espina Prize for new writers in 1942, and became friends with fellow Valdepeñas poet Juan Alcaide, Luis Felipe Vivanco, Leopoldo Panero, Luis Rosales, and the Valdepeñas-born painter and writer Gregorio Prieto. She took part in the women’s literary circle Versos con faldas, promoted by Gloria Fuertes, Adelaida Las Santas, and María Dolores de Pablos, between 1951 and 1953 in Madrid.

In 1970 she was a finalist for the Álamo Prize with Hormigón translúcido. She received a literary creation grant from the Juan March Foundation in 1973, and another from the Ministry of Culture in 1982. With her book Poemas de La Diana, she protested vigorously against the plan to designate the natural area around Anchuras as a military firing range—an area that was later protected as Cabañeros National Park.

Her poetry is mainly strophic (sonnets, including the curious variant of the sonexástrofo: three quatrains and three tercets; occasionally liras). Her most important theme is the search for God. In 2005, the Government of Castilla-La Mancha awarded her the Regional Merit Plaque. She died on March 5, 2006, shortly before her eighty-second birthday. Her personal archive and library (six thousand volumes) were donated by her son Francisco Javier Torres Calderón to the Municipal Historical Archive of Valdepeñas. The city council named her Favorite Daughter of Valdepeñas in 1985 and gave her name to a park inaugurated that same year.

== Her works ==
- Primer libro de poesías (1940–1950)
- Segundo libro de poesías (1951–1963)
- Tercer libro de poesías (August 1964 – September 1965)
- Catorce bocas me alimentan. Sonetos. Madrid, Editora Nacional (1968)
- Hormigón Translúcido. Salamanca (1970)
- Carta a Dios. Madrid, Alfaguara (1971)
- Esta espina dorsal estremecida. Sonetos. Madrid, Oriens (1973); 2nd ed. Madrid: Torremozas, 2007
- Los ojos nunca crecen. Poema autobiográfico. Salamanca (1975)
- Regreso al corazón. Madrid, Rialp (1981)
- Íntima a Quijote. Madrid, Asociación de Escritores y Artistas Españoles (1986)
- Poemas de La Diana. Salamanca (1993)
- Ritmos desde el péndulo de mi vida. Valdepeñas: Ayuntamiento (2006)
- Estremecido verso. Antología poética. Selected by José María Balcells. Ciudad Real: Diputación (2006)
