= Versos con faldas =

Women's literary salon in Madrid (1951–1953)

- Participants of the literary salon Versos con faldas in Madrid, c. 1951–1953. Photo published by Instituto Cervantes.
- Formation: March 5, 1951
- Founder: Gloria Fuertes, Adelaida Las Santas, María Dolores de Pablos
- Dissolved: 1953
- Type: Tertulia / literary salon
- Purpose: To provide a space for women poets to share and present their work
- Headquarters: Madrid, Spain
- Location: Asociación Artístico-Literaria del Teatro Gallego, Carrera de San Jerónimo, 5 (Madrid)
- Region served: Spain
- Products: Poetry recitals, anthologies
- Official language: Spanish
- Key people: Ángela Figuera Aymerich, Carmen Conde, Sagrario Torres
- Main organ: Asociación de Escritores y Artistas (from 1952)

Versos con faldas was a women's literary salon held in Madrid (Spain) between 1951 and 1953. It was promoted by Gloria Fuertes, Adelaida Las Santas and María Dolores de Pablos with the aim that, given the scant presence of women in poetry recitals, women poets would have a place to present their work and share their literary concerns.

== Development of the salon ==
The first Versos con Faldas gathering was held on 5 March 1951 in the basement of the Asociación Artístico-Literaria del Teatro Gallego, located at number 5 on the Carrera de San Jerónimo in Madrid. The singularity of the experience drew several photographers and journalists. Days later, the newspaper Pueblo ran an article titled "Gloria, Adelaida y María Dolores han enfaldado la poesía".

At first they met every Monday at the Asociación del Teatro Gallego, but the leaders there soon began to put pressure on them to stop holding their poetic gatherings there. Gloria Fuertes described it in a 1952 interview with "El folletín":

"They installed a table football game in the room where we met, and when a poetess began to recite, the members shouted around the table with great merriment."

This conflict led the salon to move to the Asociación de Escritores y Artistas (Association of Writers and Artists), which implied—despite the founders’ reluctance—the condition of paying for the venue and therefore charging one peseta as an admission fee. This change, which also made the salon fortnightly, together with the suppression by the Francoist dictatorship's Dirección General de Seguridad in 1952 of café recitals and salons, marked the beginning of its gradual loss of momentum. Before its disappearance in 1953, meetings were also held at the Centro Asturiano de Madrid and other closed venues.

Despite the dissolution of Versos con Faldas, in subsequent years many of the authors maintained ties and mutual support networks, coincided in other spaces, and saw anthologies published that included some of their work. Examples include Poesía femenina española viviente (1954) and Poesía femenina española (1950–1960) (1971), both published by Carmen Conde.

== Participants ==
Over the year and a half that the salon lasted, around 60 women poets took part, although only the names of 47 are known.

In addition to Gloria Fuertes, the founders included Adelaida Las Santas (Villarejo de Salvanés, 1918 – Madrid, 2006), who financed the salon's handbills/programmes. A journalist by profession, she collaborated with various Madrid newspapers, was very active in the recitals of the 1950s, gave lectures from the 1960s onward, and directed a poetry series. She also served for two years as director of the Sonnet Cycle at the Ateneo de Madrid. The third founder was María Dolores de Pablos (Madrid, 1917–1981), a versatile writer, theosophist and enthusiast of painting and astrology. She presented a programme related to astrology on Radio España between 1958 and 1960. A teacher of astrology from 1963, she was fundamental to the creation ten years later of the Escuela Cultura Astrológica.

Other participants included Ángela Figuera Aymerich, Sagrario Torres, Carolina D’Antin, María Luisa Chicote, Rosario Moncada, María Ontiveros, Carmen de la Torre Vivero, Elvira González Sierra, Carmen Barberá, Stella Corvalán, Carmen Martín de la Cámara, Josefina de Silva, María Settier, and María Paz Villoria.

== Books documenting the salon ==
=== First edition of the book Versos con Faldas (1983) ===
With the intention of documenting the experience, Adelaida Las Santas published the book Versos con Faldas in 1983, with a prologue and note by Gloria Fuertes and an introduction recounting the history of the salon. The anthology compiles poems by 47 of the participants together with some, albeit scant, biographical data. While part of the authors had developed a recognised literary career—such as Gloria Fuertes, Carmen Conde or Ángela Figuera Aymerich—for many it was the only publication in which their work had appeared up to that time.

=== Second edition of the book Versos con Faldas (2019) ===
Building on the first edition, Fran Garcerá and Marta Porpetta undertook research that culminated in the publication in 2019 of the second and more complete edition of Versos con Faldas. It reconstructs the lives of the 47 poets who appeared in the first edition along with selections of their work and, in most cases, photographs and signatures. The volume also includes handbills/programmes from this and other later salons as well as book inscriptions among the different poets.
