= Maria Torres =

Maria Torres may refer to:

- Maria Torres (activist), a Filipino princess and activist
- María Torres Frías (1877 or 1883 – 1953 or 1954), an Argentine poet and writer
- María Torres García (born 1997), a Spanish karateka
- Maria Torres (golfer) (born 1994), a Puerto Rican professional golfer
- María Torres Murcia (born 2002), a Colombian tennis player
- Maria Torres-Springer (born 1977), an American government official
- María Torres Tejada (born 1981), a Spanish politician
- Maria Torres, a character in the American soap opera Sunset Beach
- Maria Torres, a character in the video game Trauma Team
- María Amelia Torres (1934–2011), Argentine botanist and agrostologist
- María Elena Torres Baltazar, (born 1961), Mexican politician
- Maria-Elena Torres-Padilla, Mexican biologist
- María Marcela Torres Peimbert (born 1961), Mexican politician
- María del Sagrario Torres Calderón (1922–2006), Spanish poet
- Maria Ximena Torres Carrera (born 1981), Uruguayan chef and television personality
