= Carmen de la Torre =

Spanish poet (1931 – 2008) associated with Versos con faldas

Carmen de la Torre Vivero
- Born: Carmen de la Torre Vivero; 1931; Madrid, Spain
- Died: 15 December 2008 (aged 76–77); Madrid, Spain
- Education: Royal Conservatory of Music of Madrid
- Occupations: Poet; Professor of declamation
- Years active: 1952–1987
- Known for: Participation in Versos con faldas; lectures on Eduardo Rosales
- Notable work: En las orillas de un lago (1952); Parajes líricos (1963); Capas españolas (1965); Presentimiento (1977); Páginas de la vida del pintor Eduardo Rosales (1978); Camino de Bulgaria (1986)
- Movement: Versos con faldas
- Spouse: José Luis Comas Acosta (m. 1963)
- Awards: French Silver Civil Medal (1962); Medal of Honor and Merit (Vinculación de Ciencias, Artes y Letras, Buenos Aires, 1959); Artistic and Cultural Merit Medal of Paris (1962); Palms of Merit of the Conservatory of Bois-Colombes (1963)

Carmen de la Torre Vivero (Madrid, 1931 – ibid., December 15, 2008) was a Spanish poet associated with the literary movement known as Versos con faldas.

== Career ==
From childhood she wrote poetry, but aware that no one in Spain could make a living from poetry, she sought collaborations in the press to obtain a regular income.

In 1947 she sat a competitive examination for auxiliary positions at the Ministry of Finance, though it is not known whether she actually entered the civil service.

She graduated from the Madrid Royal Conservatory, won in 1951 the First Prize for Declamation, and later became a professor of that discipline at the same institution.

In 1952 she published her first book of poetry, En las orillas de un lago, with a prologue by the Marquis of Lozoya, after which she began collaborating with European and American magazines. Her interest in the Spanish cloak led her to compose at least two books in its honor, which earned her admission to the Spanish Cape Association.

On 31 March 1963, she married José Luis Comas Acosta, and both appeared as “capistas” in photographs taken by Martín Santos Yubero. In 1965 she self-published Capas españolas, with a prologue by Dr. Castillo de Lucas.

In January 1974, during a tribute to painter Eduardo Rosales, she delivered at the Royal Economic Society of Friends of the Country the lecture “Pages from the Life of the Painter Eduardo Rosales”, analyzing his artistic beginnings, his stay in Rome, works, awards, and the circumstances of his death. In March 1979 she presented at the International Press Club a poetry book considered extraordinary, Presentimiento. That same year a cultural association of Alcorcón invited her to present at the Ateneo de Madrid the First National Poetry Contest “Alforjas para la Paz”.

She died in Madrid on 15 December 2008 without descendants.

== Honors ==
She was named Academic Member of the Accademia di Paestum of Salerno; Corresponding Member of the Vinculación de Ciencias, Artes y Letras of Buenos Aires; Honorary Member of the Club de Intelectuales Franceses of Paris; Honorary Member of the Columbus Association of Trieste; Honorary Member of the Instituto Genealógico Brasileiro of São Paulo; and Corresponding Member of the Academia de Filosofía y Literatura of Buenos Aires, among others.

In 1962 the Ansaldi Literary Academy of Paris awarded her the French Silver Civil Medal for literary and cultural merit. She also received the Medal of Honor and Merit of the Vinculación de Ciencias, Artes y Letras of Buenos Aires (1959); the Commandership of the Star of Merit of the Légion des Volontaires du Sang; the Artistic and Cultural Merit Medal of the City of Paris (1962); and the Palms of Merit Medal of the Conservatory of Bois-Colombes (1963).

== Works ==
- 1953 – En las orillas de un lago. Madrid: author's edition. [Poetry]
- 1963 – Parajes líricos. Madrid: author's edition. [Poetry]
- 1965 – Capas españolas. Madrid: author's edition. [Poetry]
- 1965 – Glosas poéticas de los refranes de la capa. Madrid: author's edition. [Poetry]
- 1970 – Poemas a Madrid. Madrid: author's edition. [Poetry]
- 1974 – Eternidad. Madrid: author's edition. [Poetry]
- 1977 – Presentimiento. Madrid: Martín & Macías. [Poetry]
- 1978 – Páginas de la vida del pintor Eduardo Rosales. Madrid: Reyes. [Biography]
- 1985 – Roca. Madrid: Catoblepas. [Poetry]
- 1986 – Camino de Bulgaria. Madrid: Editorial Popular. [Biography]
- 1987 – Poemas de mis viajes. Madrid: author's edition. [Poetry]
