= María Luisa Chicote =

María Luisa Martí Menasalvas
- Born: August 12, 1920; Barcelona, Spain
- Died: September 22, 1989; Madrid, Spain
- Occupation: Poet

María Luisa Martí Menasalvas (Barcelona, 12 August 1920 – Madrid, 22 September 1989), who used the pen names María Luisa Chicote and Marisa Chicote, was a Spanish poet, associated with several literary groups including Versos con Faldas and Alforjas para la Poesía.

== Career ==
She was born in Barcelona but always considered herself to be from La Mancha, where she moved with her family at a very young age.

She completed secondary education at the Institute of Ciudad Real and, by the late 1940s, relocated to Madrid. Perhaps because she used a pseudonym or lived a discreet life, little biographical information is available about her. In 1971, she submitted a short résumé for inclusion in Poesía femenina española (1950–1960), edited by Carmen Conde.

According to that résumé, Chicote began writing in 1960, although records show that shortly after arriving in Madrid she became known in literary circles and poetry gatherings of the time, including the Círculo Cultural Medina, Alforjas para la Poesía, and especially Versos con Faldas.

She maintained close relationships with members of these groups, participating with them in numerous poetic events.

During the 1960s, she published regularly in magazines such as El Molino de Papel, Punta Europa, Lanza and La Estafeta Literaria. In 1965, she self-published Jirones, with a prologue by Emilio Miró, a selection of verses written up to that point. These poems also reveal that she had started writing at a very young age. Several more poetry books followed. In the next decade, her poems continued to appear in the literary supplements of the newspaper ABC.

She married José Chicote Conde, from whom she took the surname used in her pseudonyms, and had two daughters, María Gracia Greta and Paloma. She died in Madrid on 22 September 1989, leaving behind a book titled Cardencha, a trilogy that was partially published posthumously.

=== Con Vietnam ===
Chicote's poetry had a distinctly social character, although some critics felt she was more at ease in the realm of romantic poetry.

In 1968, Angelina Gatell was preparing an anthology about the Vietnam War, titled Con Vietnam, which was banned by government censorship and would not be published until many years later, in 2016.

Chicote submitted a poem for the anthology, Yo pecador ("I, Sinner"), along with a letter expressing doubt that it would be accepted, since it was an open panegyric to the Vietnamese soldiers:

Tiny scarlet-ivory giants
who know of gunpowder upon tears and kisses.

Guerrillas of the sun,
sons of the morning,
who sow yourselves generously

fertilized with blood.

Confronted with the unequal struggle of the Vietnamese people, the poet expressed shame at the comfort and passivity of Spanish society in the face of the war's horrors, turning her poem into a genuine mea culpa.

== Works ==
- 1965 – Jirones, with a prologue by Emilio Miró.
- 1970 – Esquina doblada.
- 1991 – Testimonio para el olvido, posthumous book with a prologue by Emilio Miró.
- 1994 – Imágenes y sueños, posthumous book.

Her poems were also included in the following anthologies:

- 1966 – Antología de Poesía Española 1964–1965, by Luis Jiménez Martos.
- 1971 – Poesía Femenina Española (1950–1960), by Carmen Conde.
