= Carlos Edmundo de Ory =

Spanish avant-garde poet

Carlos Edmundo de Ory (April 27, 1923 – November 11, 2010) was a Spanish avant-garde poet. In the circle of friends of Eduardo de Ory were poets as Salvador Rueda, Amado Nervo, Juan Ramón Jiménez, Manuel Reina and Rubén Darío.

== Life ==
Ory was born on April 27, 1923, in Cádiz. He was a son of Eduardo de Ory, who was a modernist poet and founder of the Academia Hispanoamericana de Cádiz (Cádiz's Spanish American Society). He was fundamental in modernizing post-Spanish Civil War poetry by creating work that engaged major twentieth-century European avant-gardes such as Futurism, Dadaism, and Surrealism. He, along with Eduardo Chicharro and the Italian poet Silvano Sernesi, was the co-founder of a poetry movement called Postismo (Postism).

Postism consisted of a loose group of writers creating work that valued language play and was set against the neo-romanticism of Spain’s official literary culture. Among the writers associated with the movement are Ángel Crespo, Gloria Fuertes, Juan Eduardo Cirlot, and Gabriel Celaya. Ory twice tried to bring out a literary journal to advance the work and tenets of Postism, but on both occasions the journal was censored by the fascist government of Franco and was not allowed to be distributed.

In the face of so much opposition, Postism was short-lived and faded into obscurity with Ory himself continuing to write and publish far from the public view. He ended up leaving Spain for France in the 1960s to escape the suffocating literary and political environment. It was only in the 1970s that poets and critics (particularly Catalan poet and critic Jaume Pont) essentially re-discovered Postism and Ory. Since that time, both Ory and the movement have been increasingly recognized and influential on the Spanish literary landscape.

Ory’s role in Spain is analogous to that of Allen Ginsberg and the Beat poets in the United States: he opened Spanish poetry up to new possibilities of poetic language and content. In fact, Ginsberg, along with Edith Grossman, translated a volume of Ory’s poetry, though the book never made it into circulation. Ginsberg also dedicated a poem to Ory in his book Cosmopolitan Greetings. For almost six decades Ory has been one of Spain’s most innovative and original writers, publishing numerous works of poetry and criticism. He lived with his wife, French artist Laura Lachéroy, in the village of Thézy-Glimont in France until his death on November 11, 2010 of leukaemia.

== Selected works ==
- Melos Melancolía (Ediciones Igitur, 2003)
- Antología (de Bolsillo, 2001)
