= Ángel Crespo =

Spanish poet and translator (1926–1995)

Ángel Crespo (18 July 1926 in Alcolea de Calatrava, Province of Ciudad Real – 12 December 1995 in Barcelona) was a Spanish poet and translator.

Crespo was the author of over thirty books of poetry. He also published over twenty books of translations (ranging from the work of Dante and Petrarch to that of Fernando Pessoa and Eugénio de Andrade) and numerous works of literary criticism. One of Spain's most prestigious translation prizes, the Premio de Traducción Ángel Crespo, was named after him.

Crespo was raised in the La Mancha region of Spain. Early in his career, he was associated with Carlos Edmundo de Ory, Gabino-Alejandro Carriedo and the Postism literary movement. He was labeled a traitor under Spain's Francoist State for signing a petition to protest the torture of miners in Asturias. Afterwards, he participated in clandestine antigovernment activities until he was eventually driven into exile. He lived with his wife, translator and professor Pilar Gómez Bedate, in various places including Sweden and Puerto Rico before returning to Spain in the 1980s.

Victor García de la Concha, professor at the University of Salamanca and Director of the Royal Spanish Academy, has written that “few Spanish poets of the last forty years have achieved a voice as vital and sustained as Ángel Crespo.” His work is often surreal and manifests a deep engagement with nature and the classics. Some of his best work came in the aphorism and prose poem forms.

In 1993 he was awarded the Premio Nacional a la Obra de un Traductor.

== Selected works ==
- Poemas en Prosa: 1965-1994 (Ediciones Igitur, 1998)
- La Realidad Entera (Galaxia Gutenberg/Círculo de Lectores, 2005 )
