= Martín Santos =

Martín Santos may refer to:

== Given name and surname ==
- Martin Santos (born 1962), cyclist from Guam
- Martín Santos Gómez, Mexican politician, represented the 13th federal electoral district of Guanajuato
- Martín Santos Romero (1910-?), Spanish politician, recipient of the Civil Order of Alfonso X, the Wise
- Martín Santos Yubero (1903–1994), Spanish photographer

== Surname ==
- Luis Martín-Santos (1924–1964), Spanish psychiatrist and author
