= Mercè Canela =

Spanish writer and translator

Mercè Canela (born 1956, Sant Guim de Freixenet, la Segarra) is a Catalan writer and translator.

She studied archaeology in Universitat Autònoma de Barcelona, where she worked as a librarian later before she went to Brussels to work as a documentalist in the European Union.

She started writing when she was very young, and she considers herself basically a writer. In 1976, the publishing house La Galera published one of her books for teenagers De qui és el bosc?, and she won the Josep M. Folch i Torres award with L'escarabat verd. She published several children's and teenagers' novels later and she has won several prizes for them. In 1984, she was included in the Honour List of IBBY with Asperú, joglar embruixat.

She has translated to Catalan several works in German, French and Italian. Besides, she published: Un passeig pel Poble Espanyol (Beta, Barcelona, 1998), a book which explains the history of Poble Espanyol, in Montjuïc, in Barcelona. In 1980, she was a member of Cavall Fort magazine, where she is director since 1998. She is also director in El Tatano publications.

== Bibliography ==
=== Children's literature ===
- De qui és el bosc? (La Galera, Barcelona, 1976).
- L'escarabat verd. (La Galera, Barcelona, 1977).
- Utinghami, el rei de la boira (La Galera, Barcelona, 1979).
- La fantasia inacabable d'Antoni Gaudí (Blume, Barcelona, 1980).
- Quan l'Eloi va ser música (La Galera, Barcelona, 1981).
- Asperú, joglar embruixat (La Galera, Barcelona, 1982).
- Lluna de tardor. (La Magrana, Barcelona, 1982).
- A una mà el sol i a l'altra la lluna (Argos-Vergara, Barcelona, 1982).
- Un gat dalt del teulat (La Galera, Barcelona, 1983).
- Globus de lluna plena (Argos-Vergara, Barcelona, 1983).
- Els set enigmes de l'iris (La Galera, Barcelona, 1984).
- El planeta dels set sols. (Xarxa de Biblioteques Soler i Palet, Terrassa, 1985 / Barcelona: La Magrana, Barcelona, 1993).
- Ara torno. (La Magrana, Barcelona, 1985).
- L'ou de cristall (La Galera, Barcelona, 1987).
- Nicolaua braç de ferro (Teide, Barcelona, 1987).
- El rastre de les bombolles. (La Magrana, Barcelona, 1990).
- S'ha de ser animal! (Cruïlla, Barcelona, 1992).
- Les portes del temps (Cruïlla, Barcelona, 1995).
- Per un plat de macarrons. (Cruïlla, Barcelona, 1997).
- La casa de les acàcies. (Barcanova, Barcelona, 1997).
- Els dimarts del senyor F. (Cruïlla, Barcelona, 1998).
- Una pintura als llençols. (Cruïlla, Barcelona, 2004).
- La butxaca prodigiosa (Cruïlla, Barcelona, 2007).

=== Translations ===
- German
  - AUER, Martin: Allò que ningú no pot saber [Was niemand wissen kann]. (La Galera, Barcelona, 1989).
  - BOGE-ERLI, Nortrud: El porc viatger [Emil Reiseschwein und die Meermonster]. (Cruïlla, Barcelona, 1997).
  - DIECK, Barbara: Un viatge mogudet [Klassenfahrt und coole Typen]. (Cruïlla, Barcelona, 1997).
  - MENSCHING, Gerhard: L'amic fantasma [Das Gespenterfreund]. (La Galera, Barcelona, 1990).
  - NÖSTLINGER, Christine: L'autèntica Susi [Echt Susi]. (Cruïlla, Barcelona, 1996).
  - PLUDRA, Benno: El cor del pirata [Das Herz des Piraten]. (La Galera, Barcelona, 1986).
- (in Spanish)
  - LALANA, Fernando: El Papu està pioc [El Coco está pachucho]. (Casals, Barcelona, 1997).
- (in French)
  - DEMEURE, Jean-Paul: Milac [Milac]. (Cruïlla, Barcelona, 0000)
  - FERRI, Jean-Yves; LARCENET, Manu: El retorn a la terra 1. L'autèntica vida. (Bang, Barcelona, 2006).
  - FERRI, Jean-Yves; LARCENET, Manu: El retorn a la terra 2. Els projectes [Le retour à la terre 2. Les projets]. (Bang, Barcelona, 2006).
- (in Italian)
  - BARICCO, Alessandro: Seda [Seta]. (La Magrana, Barcelona, 1997).
  - BARICCO, Alessandro: Oceà [Oceano Mare]. (La Magrana, Barcelona, 1997).
  - BARICCO, Alessandro: Terres de vidre [Castelli di Rabbia]. (La Magrana, Barcelona, 1998).
  - BARICCO, Alessandro: Novecento: un monòleg [Novecento: un monologo]. (La Magrana, Barcelona, 2000).

=== Translated works ===
- Translations of Asperú, joglar embruixat
  - Castilian. Asperú, el juglar embrujado. (Trad. Jesús Ballaz Zabalza). La Galera, Barcelona, 1983.
- Translations of A una mà el sol i a l'altra la lluna
  - Castilian. En una mano el sol y en la otra la luna. (Trad. María Eugenia Rincón). Argos-Vergara, Barcelona, 1982.
  - Euskera. Esku patez eguzkia eta besteax i larga. (Trad. Josu Landa). Argos-Vergara, Barcelona, 1983.
  - Galician. Nunha mano o sol e na outra a lúa. (Trad. Basilio Losada). Argos-Vergara, Barcelona, 1982.
- Translations of De qui és el bosc?
  - Castilian. ¿De quién es el bosque?. (Trad. Maria del Carmen Rute). Barcelona: La Galera, Barcelona, 1976.
  - Euskera. Norena da basoa?. (Trad. Joxan Ormazábal). Euskal Liburu eta Kantuen Argitaldaria, Donostia, 1981.
- Translations of El rastre de les bombolles
  - Castilian. Partitura para saxo. (Trad. Rosa Huguet). SM, Madrid, 1993.
- Translations of Els set enigmes de l'iris
  - Castilian. Los siete enigmas del iris. (Trad. Angelina Gatell). La Galera, Barcelona, 1984.
- Translations of En Pere trapella
  - Breton. Pêr al Lankon. (Trad. Beatris Jouin). An Here, Kemper, 1989.
  - Castilian. Pedro pícaro. (Trad. José Antonio Pastor Cañada). La Galera, Barcelona, 1983.
  - Sardinian. Pedru Matzone. (Trad. Diegu Corraine). Papiros, Nùgoro, 1989.
- Translations of Globus de lluna plena
  - Castilian. Globo de luna llena. (Trad. Julia Goytisolo). Argos-Vergara, Barcelona, 1983.
  - Euskera. Llargi beteko globoak. (Trad. Josu Landa). Argos-Vergara, Barcelona, 1983.
  - Galician. Globo de lúa chea. (Trad. Carlos Casares). Argos-Vergara, Barcelona, 1982.
- Translations of L'escarabat verd
  - Castilian. El anillo del mercader. (Trad. María Luisa Lissón). La Galera, Barcelona, 1977.
- Translations of L'oca d'or
  - Castilian. La oca de oro. (Trad. José Antonio Pastor Cañada). La Galera, Barcelona, 1984.
  - Swedish. Guldgansen. (Trad. Yvonne Blank). Almqvist & Wiksell, Estocolm, 1986.
- Translations of L'ou de cristall
  - Castilian. El huevo de cristal. (Trad. Angelina Gatell). La Galera, Barcelona, 1987.
- Translations of Nicolaua, braç de ferro
  - Castilian. Nicolasa, muñeca de hierro. (Trad. Carme Pallach). Teide, Barcelona, 1987.
- Translations of Quan l'Eloi va ser música
  - Castilian. Eloy un día fue música. (Trad. José Antonio Pastor Cañada). La Galera, Barcelona, 1981.
- Translations of Un gat dalt del teulat
  - Castilian. Un gato en el tejado. (Trad. Mercedes Caballud). La Galera, Barcelona, 1983.
- Translations of Un passeig pel Poble Espanyol
  - English. A walk through the Spanish Village. Beta, Barcelona, 1998.
  - Castilian. Un paseo por el Pueblo Español. Beta, Barcelona, 1998.
- Translations of Utinghami, el rei de la boira
  - Castilian. Utinghami, el rey de la niebla. (Trad. Joles Sennell). La Galera, Barcelona, 1979.
  - Euskera. Utinghami lainotako errege. (Trad. Arantxa Sarriegi). Euskal Liburu eta Kantuen Argitaldaria, Donostia, 1981.

== Literature prizes ==
- Premi Josep Maria Folch i Torres de novel·les per a nois i noies 1976: L'escarabat verd.
- Premi Crítica Serra d'Or de literatura infantil i juvenil 1981: La fantasia inacabable d'Antoni Gaudí.
- Premi L'Esparver 1982: Lluna de tardor.
- Premi Guillem Cifre de Colonya 1983: Els set enigmes de l'iris.
- Premi Lola Anglada 1984: El planeta dels set sols.
- Premi de Literatura Infantil El Vaixell de Vapor 1991: S'ha de ser animal!.
