= Angelina Gatell =

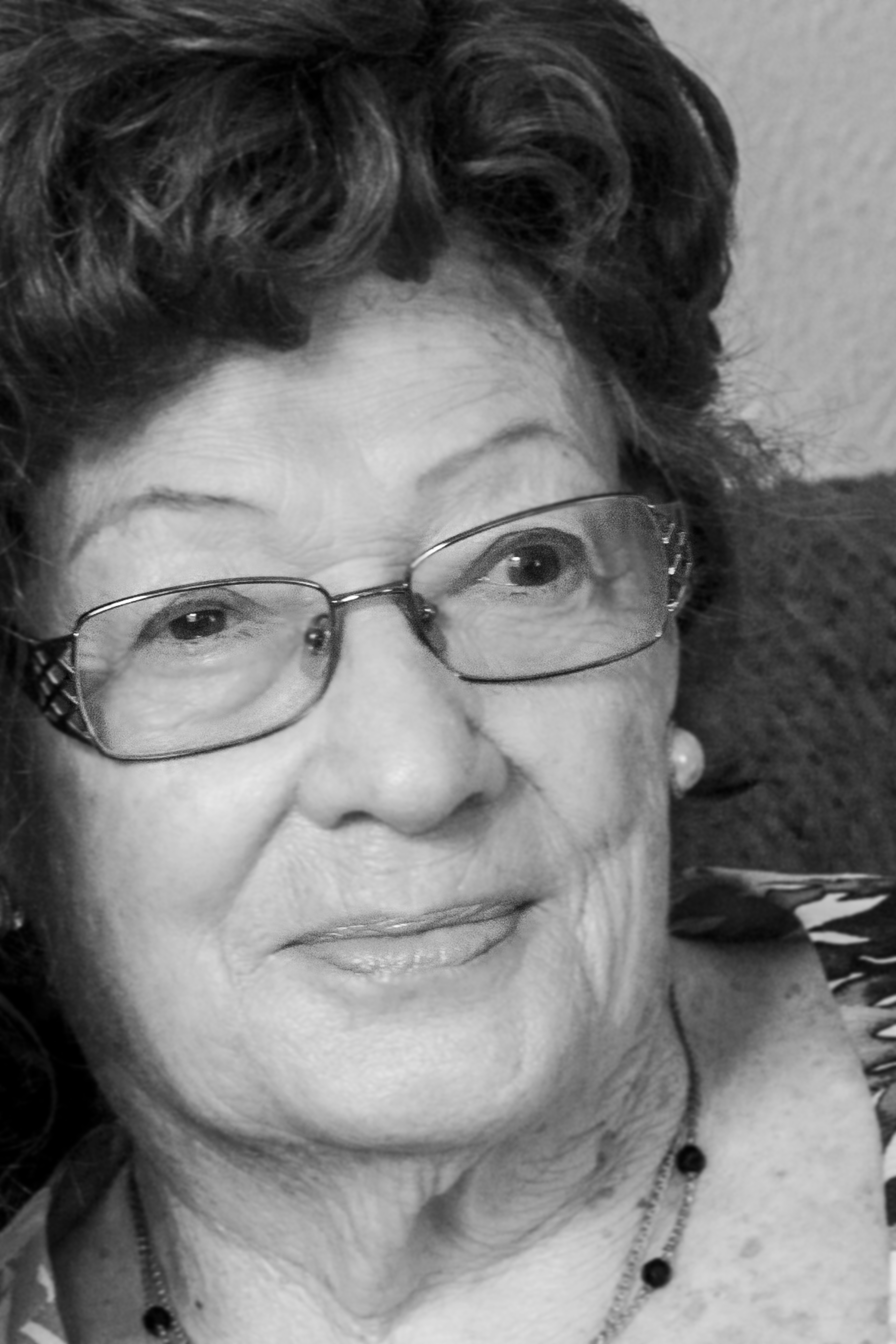
- Born: Angelina Gatell Comas; June 8, 1926; Barcelona, Kingdom of Spain
- Died: January 7, 2017 (aged 91); Madrid, Spain
- Education: Colegio Pi i Margall (Santa Coloma de Gramenet)
- Occupations: Poet, Translator, Voice actress, Actress
- Movement: Social poetry
- Spouse: Eduardo Sánchez Lázaro
- Children: Miguel Sánchez Gatell, Mar Sánchez Gatell, Eduardo Sánchez Gatell
- Awards: Valencia Poetry Prize

Angelina Gatell Comas (June 8, 1926 – January 7, 2017) was a poet, translator, dubbing actress, and a woman who worked in the defense of several political, social, and cultural causes.

== Biography ==
According to her own words, she was born into a poor and combative family. Her father was a tanner who lost his business at the start of the Second Spanish Republic. The family had to leave their home in Barcelona and move to Santa Coloma de Gramenet, where Angelina studied at the Pi i Margall School and the Manent School. She grew up through the war and post-war period, witnessing, as a child, the flight of refugees heading toward the French border. In Valencia, where she moved with her family in 1941, she collaborated with the International Red Aid at the age of 17. She continued her secondary education but had to abandon it when her father became paralyzed after a stroke.

In post-war Valencia she first engaged with the cultural world around the literary café El Gato Negro, attended by the Gaos brothers, José Hierro, the painter Ricardo Zamorano, poets José Luis Hidalgo and María Beneyto, the García Luengo brothers, and Pedro Caba Landa, among others, all linked to the magazine Corcel.

Her first professional work was as an actress. In Valencia she met Amparo Reyes, who hired her to perform classical plays through the Sierra de Guadarrama, including the Entremeses of Cervantes. She gradually became a professional actress in small Valencian theaters. In 1952 she and her husband, Eduardo Sánchez Lázaro, founded El Paraíso, one of the first chamber theaters in Spain. With Eduardo she had three children: Eduardo, María del Mar, and Miguel Sánchez Gatell. In 1954 she won the Valencia Poetry Prize with her book Poema del soldado. She published poetry in magazines such as Verbo and La Caña Gris.

In 1958 the family moved to Madrid, where she joined the literary and cultural circles: she attended Gerardo Diego’s gatherings at the Café Gijón, frequently visited Vicente Aleixandre at his house in Velintonia, and took part in José Hierro’s literary circle at the Ateneo de Madrid.

The latter was dissolved by censorship, prompting Gatell, Hierro, Aurora de Albornoz, and José Gerardo Manrique de Lara to found the Plaza Mayor literary group, joined by writers such as Carmen Conde, Félix Grande, Francisco Brines, Luis Rosales, Antonio Buero Vallejo, Ángel González, Gerardo Diego, Ángela Figuera Aymerich, and Vicente Gaos. During this period she wrote literary criticism for Poesía Española, Cuadernos Hispanoamericanos, and later El Urogallo.

In Madrid she began working for Televisión Española as an actress, screenwriter, and dubbing artist.

She signed a letter with other intellectuals to Minister Manuel Fraga protesting the repression of Asturian miners in 1963. Refusing to retract, she was blacklisted by TVE.

In 1964, TVE accepted her script for a dramatized biography of Marie Curie, but broadcast it under another author's name. After protesting, she recovered her authorship but was never rehired.

She later worked at dubbing studios SAGO and Oro Films as an actress, director, and dialogue adapter. She famously renamed the dog in the series Heidi from its original name, "Joseph", to "Niebla" ("Fog"), inspired by a dog mentioned by Pablo Neruda. She also worked on the TV series Marco and Once Upon a Time... Man.

Politically engaged, Gatell was a lifelong member of the Spanish Socialist Workers’ Party and collaborated with the Communist Party of Spain on the anthology Con Vietnam condemning the Vietnam War. Completed in 1968 but censored, it was rediscovered by professor Julio Neira and published by Visor in 2016. She also co-authored with Carmen Conde Poesía femenina española 1950-1960 (1971), and decades later Mujer que soy (Bartleby, 2006).

After more than thirty years without publishing poetry, she returned through Manuel Rico Rego and Bartleby Editores. Though silent publicly, she continued writing intensely. In a 1969 interview with ABC newspaper, she stated:

"It is not objectivity that I seek, but passion. That is, for me, the spring that sets in motion the world of poetry. I do not understand cerebral, purely intellectual poetry. When someone says I am rhetorical, I feel comforted: rhetoric, well understood, is the third spring; the second is ideas. Handled together, they make the poem."

== Literary works ==
=== Published poetry ===
- Poema del soldado, Valencia Poetry Prize, 1955 (2nd ed., Bartleby, 2020).
- Esa oscura palabra, La Isla de los Ratones Series, Santander, 1963.
- Las claudicaciones, Biblioteca Nueva, Madrid, 1969 (2nd ed., Torremozas, 2010).
- Los espacios vacíos y Desde el olvido, Bartleby, Madrid, 2001.
- Noticia del tiempo, Bartleby, Madrid, 2004.
- Cenizas en los labios, Bartleby, Madrid, 2011.
- La oscura voz del cisne, Bartleby, Madrid, 2015.
- La Veu Perduda, Visor, Madrid, 2018.
- Sobre mis propios pasos (Poesía Completa, Vol. I), Bartleby, Madrid, 2023.

=== Anthologies ===
- Antología de la poesía amorosa contemporánea, with Carmen Conde (Bruguera, Barcelona, 1969).
- Poesía femenina española, with Carmen Conde (Bruguera, Barcelona, 1971).
- Mis primeras lecturas poéticas (Antología poética para niños), Libros Río Nuevo, Barcelona, 1980.
- Mujer que soy. La voz femenina en la poesía social y testimonial de los años cincuenta, Bartleby, Madrid, 2006.
- En soledad, con ella, Bartleby, Madrid, 2015.

=== Biographies ===
- Mis primeros héroes (17 biografías cortas para niños), Libros Río Nuevo, Barcelona, 1969.
- Neruda, EPESA, Madrid, 1971.
- Memorias y desmemorias. Autobiografía, Fundación AISGE / T&B Editores (2nd ed., 2014).

=== Children's books ===
- El hombre del acordeón, Espasa-Calpe, Madrid, 1988.
- La aventura peligrosa de una vocal presuntuosa, Aliorna, Barcelona, 1988 (Spanish and Catalan editions).
- La aventura peligrosa de una vocal presuntuosa, Grupo Anaya, Madrid, 1994, “El duende verde” series.

=== Compiler ===
- Con Vietnam (1968). Visor, Madrid, 2016.

=== Unpublished poetry ===
- De mar a mar.
- Décimas de la emigrante.

=== Unpublished children's books ===
- Una ciudad en el subsuelo.
- La extraña aventura de Quico Vera.
- Trébol.
- Una niña singular que no para de rimar.
- La niña que se bebió un río.

=== Translation and dubbing ===
- Translated hundreds of books, mainly for children and young readers, for publishers such as Anaya, Espasa-Calpe, La Galera, and Santillana.
- Adapted and directed dubbing for numerous films and TV series, including Dynasty, The Colbys, and The Loves of Napoleon.
- Directed Spanish dubbing for animated series such as Once Upon a Time... Man, Marco, and Heidi.
- Notable work for Televisión Española includes the dramatized biography of Marie Curie.

== Interviews and articles ==
- Ayuso Pérez, Antonio (21 June 2017). "Angelina Gatell, "sad child" of the Civil War". CTXT / Público.
- Ortega Lucas, Miguel Ángel (1 March 2017). "The Burning Memory of Angelina Gatell". CTXT / Público.
- "The Day Angelina Gatell Did Not Go to Colliure". Poética 2.0. 27 February 2017.
- García Montero, Luis (10 January 2017). "Angelina Gatell: The Ingenuity of Protest". Infolibre. Archived from the original on 8 April 2017.
- Rico, Manuel (9 January 2017). "Angelina Gatell, a Woman of the Generation of '50". El País.
- Ortega Lucas, Miguel Á. (28 June 2014). "Angelina Gatell: "The last witnesses of the war cannot remain silent about it"". eldiario.es.
- Gil Martín, Javier (3 November 2017). "A Necessary Recovery: The Life and Work of the Catalan Poet Angelina Gatell". Tendencias21. Archived from the original on 10 June 2018.
