= Lourdes Cirlot =

Spanish art theorist and historian

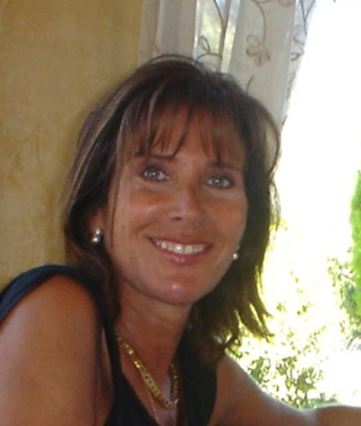
Lourdes Cirlot, March 2012

Lourdes Cirlot Valenzuela (born 1949) is a Spanish art theorist, art historian and researcher, whose work highlights diverse aspects of 20th and 21st century art. She has published books about Avant-garde art and numerous papers in journals and anthologies.

== Background ==
Cirlot is the daughter of the spanish poet and art critic Juan Eduardo Cirlot and the sister of the scholar Victoria Cirlot. In November 2011, the two sisters collaborated on the exhibitions El Mundo de Juan Eduardo Cirlot, presented in the Instituto Valenciano de Arte Moderno and Juan Eduardo Cirlot, The Imaginary Room, presented in Arts Santa Mónica.

Cirlot graduated from the faculty of Geography and History of the University of Barcelona (1973) and then obtained a Ph.D. in Art History from the same university (1980). She began her teaching career in the Department of History of Art of the Faculty of Geography and History of the University of Barcelona in 1974.

In 1997, she became a professor of History of Art in the University of Barcelona. She has served as a vice-dean in the faculty of Geography and History (1996–1999) and as a director of the Department of Art History of the University of Barcelona (1999–2005). Since 1999, she has been the principal researcher of the Art, Architecture and Digital Society, of the University of Barcelona.

As of 2011, Cirlot is the Vice-Rector of Arts, Culture and Heritage of the University of Barcelona.

== Research activities ==
Cirlot's interests within art history cover a wide range of periods and subjects. She has focused largely on art of the 20th and 21st century. Her research in the 20th Century is particularly centred on Catalan Art, Spanish art and the international movements of the avant garde, including Dadaism, surrealism, and abstract and pop art.

After establishing the Art, Architecture and Digital Society research group, she has become involved in New Media and digital technology, dedicating a great part of her research to an interdisciplinary approach to the effect of electronic and digital technology on contemporary culture and society.

Within that scope, she has been the instigator of the Virtual Museum of the University of Barcelona and has contributed significantly to the organization of conferences with a relevant subject.

She has published her work in numerous publications in three languages (Spanish, English, Catalan) and has presented the outcomes of her research in international conferences.

== Honors and awards ==
In 2011, in recognition of her contribution to the scientific community, Cirlot was awarded with the Golden Medal of the faculty of Pharmacy of the University of Barcelona.

== Published works ==
- Aracial, R.; Segura, A.; Cirlot, L.; Puig i Batalla, J.; Lo Cascio, P.; Barbé, E.; Dueñas, O.; Espinet, M.; Ubach, A.; Rúa Fernández, J. M.; Harana, L.; Giralt, O.; Prada, M.L. "Les avantguardes artístiques dels anys 30". pp. 15 – 27. (Spain): 2008
- Cirlot, L. "The Imaginary in Digital Art: Background", in: VVAA, Digital Art and Architecture: Net Art and Virtual Universes, (Spain): 2008.
- Clara Janés, Lourdes Cirlot, Museo Chillida Leku. "Los dibujos de Eduardo Chillida". pp. 47 – 177. (Spain): 2008
- Cirlot, L. "La revitalización de las imágenes del cuerpo renacentista en la obra de Bill Viola", in: VVAA, Art, Architecture and Digital Society, Spain: 200
- Cirlot, L. "Antoni Tàpies". Historia y Vida. pp. 114 – 115. (Spain): 2000
- Cirlot, L. "Primeras vanguardias artísticas. Textos y Documentos". pp. 7 – 319. (Spain): 1999
- Cirlot, L. "Arte Español e Hispanoamericano del S.XX." (Spain): 1999
- Cirlot, L.; Cirlot, V. "Momentos en 'Mundo de Juan-Eduardo Cirlot". (Spain): 1996
- Cirlot, L. "Del 'Manifest Groc' a los Manifiestos de A.D.L.A.N. o la incidencia del Futurismo y del Dadaísmo en Cataluña". Cultura italiana y española frente a frente. pp. 113 – 123. (Germany): 1992
- Cirlot, L. "Informalisme a Catalunya. Pintura". (Spain): 1990
