= Josefina de Silva y de Velasco =

- Born: Josefina de Silva y de Velasco; November 16, 1929; Madrid, Spain
- Died: July 13, 2015 (aged 85); Medina de Pomar, Spain
- Occupation: Writer
- Writing career
- Language: Spanish
- Genres: Fiction, essay, children's literature
- Notable work: Nosotros los evacuados (1976)
- Literary movement: Versos con faldas

Josefina de Silva y de Velasco (Madrid, 16 November 1929 – Medina de Pomar, 13 July 2015) was a Spanish writer associated with the literary movement Versos con faldas.

== Biography ==
Born to María Luisa de Velasco Alfaro and Manuel de Silva Precaute, Josefina de Silva came from a family with a strong literary tradition, especially on her mother's side. Her great-grandmother Rosario Vázquez Angulo (1839–1915) was the first woman to become a member of the Royal Academy of Sciences, Fine Arts and Noble Arts of Córdoba. Her maternal grandmother, Concepción Alfaro, was also a poet, and her sister Carmen de Silva Velasco is likewise a writer.

She spent the first months of the Spanish Civil War in Madrid before being evacuated with her family to Murcia. That experience inspired her autobiographical work Nosotros los evacuados (We, the Evacuated, 1976), written from a child's perspective. The final chapter, describing their return to Madrid packed into a cattle wagon, has been cited by historians as a vivid and realistic testimony.

In 1950 she began her literary career contributing to two volumes of the Colección Capricho (E.C.A. editions), dedicated to biographies of famous figures. She participated in volume XI, Nombres de oro, about actresses Carmen Cobeña, Adelina Patti, Balbina Valverde, La Caramba and Loreto Prado. In volume XII, with Mario Montilla and Roberto Mansberger, she co-wrote profiles of Teresa of Ávila, Inês de Castro, George Sand, Marie Curie, and Joan of Arc.

She married in 1956 and had one son, though the marriage lasted only four years.

De Silva worked for the publishing house Codex, and after its move to Barcelona she settled in Sant Boi de Llobregat. She later joined Plaza & Janés. While living in Catalonia, where she spent most of her life, she produced a prolific and diverse body of work, including children's literature. Devoted to educational writing, she co-authored with her sister Carmen a collection of twenty stories based on spelling rules, published in Mexico.

Although she wrote poetry, she never published a poetry collection but sent some of her poems to the Versos con faldas gatherings.

In 1975 she published the essay La otra virginidad ("The Other Virginity"), echoing the controversial ideas earlier put forward by Esther Vilar.

Linked to Medina de Pomar, where she spent her later years, she devoted herself to historical research, particularly on the House of Velasco and the Constables of Castile, from whose Riojan branch she descended. She published two studies—Santa Clara y los Velasco and La heráldica en Santa Clara—in collaboration with the Friends of Medina de Pomar Association. In 2004 she presented a poetic work, Romancero de los Velasco, dramatizing the final days of Philip the Handsome at the Casa del Cordón in Burgos.

She died in Medina de Pomar on 13 July 2015. Her research materials on the Velasco family were donated by her son to the Friends of Medina de Pomar Association, and were later included by Alicia Inés Montero Málaga in her 2017 doctoral thesis.

== Works ==
=== Fiction ===
- ¡Vamos al circo! (Plaza & Janés, 1973)
- Los secretos del zoo (Plaza & Janés, 1974)
- Gabi, Fofó y Miliki: historia de una familia de circo (Plaza & Janés, 1976)
- Informe urgente (Plaza & Janés, 1977)
- Nosotros los evacuados (Plaza & Janés, 1978)
- Perseo, patrón de Cataluña (Carena, 1996)

=== Essays ===
- La otra virginidad (Plaza & Janés, 1975)

=== Theatre ===
- Romance de don Bernardino de Velasco y el rey Felipe el Hermoso (Friends of Medina de Pomar Association, 2006)

=== Collaborative works ===
- “La Heráldica en Santa Clara” in El Monasterio de Santa Clara de Medina de Pomar: Fundación y Patronazgo de la Casa de Velasco, coordinated by Nicolás López Martínez and Emilio González Terán (2004), pp. 101–124.
- “Santa Clara y los Velasco” in the same volume, pp. 125–176.
