= Alcolea de Calatrava =

- Municipality
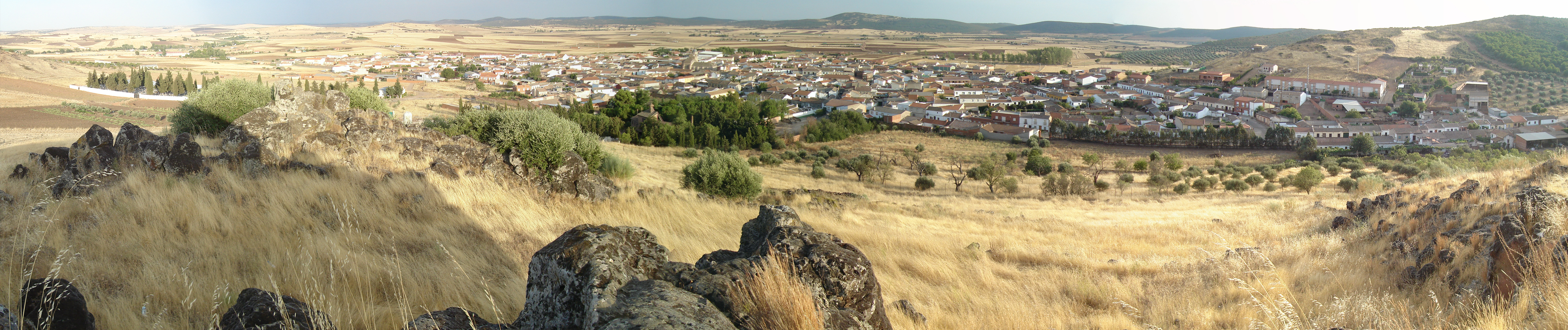

- Flag Coat of arms

- Location within Castilla-La Mancha Location within Spain
- Coordinates: 38°59′N 4°07′W
- Country: Spain
- Autonomous community: Castilla–La Mancha
- Province: Ciudad Real

Government
  - Mayor: Eduardo Plaza (PSOE)

Area
  - Total: 70.72 km^{2} (27.31 sq mi)

Population (2023)
  - Total: 1,382
  - Density: 19.54/km^{2} (50.61/sq mi)
- Demonym: Alcoleano/a
- Time zone: UTC+1 (CET)
  - Summer (DST): UTC+2 (CEST)
- Postal code: 13107
- Website: www.alcoleacva.com

Alcolea de Calatrava is a municipality in Ciudad Real, Castile-La Mancha, Spain. It has a population of 1,382.
