= María Dolores de Pablos =

Spanish poet and astrologer, co-founder of Versos con faldas

María Dolores de Pablos Zorrilla
- María Dolores de Pablos Zorrilla on Spanish TV RTVE in 1980 predicting events for 1981.
- Born: February 27, 1917; Madrid, Spain
- Died: December 19, 1981; Madrid, Spain
- Occupations: Poet, Astrologer
- Known for: Co-founder of the literary gathering Versos con faldas

María Dolores de Pablos Zorrilla (27 February 1917 – 19 December 1981) was a Spanish poet and astrologer, co-founder of the women’s poetic gathering Versos con faldas.

== Biography ==
De Pablos was born in Madrid, in the Barrio de Maravillas district, the daughter of Consuelo Zorrilla González and Victoriano de Pablos Crespo, a printer and lithographer who founded the “Litografía de Pablos” printing house.

Her family was Catholic and monarchist, which influenced her early education.

She began her studies at the María Inmaculada School on Calle de Fuencarral and showed a passion for reading from an early age, though an uncle supervised her readings and even burned some books.

With the advent of the Second Spanish Republic, her parents—opposed to mixed education—enrolled her in the Asociación para la Enseñanza de la Mujer, where she studied secretarial work, French, German, and typing.

After the Spanish Civil War, which she spent in Madrid, she worked as a typist at a police station, later in an ice-cream shop and in other jobs. In 1946, she married José San Miguel, a veterinarian stationed in Sepúlveda, where they moved to live. The birth of their first son in 1947 served as a pretext for De Pablos to return to Madrid in 1948 to her parents’ home at 30 Manuela Malasaña Street.

It was then that she began attending literary gatherings and, together with Gloria Fuertes and Adelaida Las Santas, founded Versos con faldas. The first meeting took place on 5 March 1951.

In 1950, her husband was transferred to Madrid and the couple reunited. Their daughter Paloma was born in 1952. A few years earlier, De Pablos had become interested in Theosophy, and after the government’s ban on literary gatherings in 1952, she began attending astrology meetings. Between 1958 and 1960, she hosted the daily program Dos sueños cada día ("Two Dreams Each Day") on Radio España, where she interpreted listeners’ dreams. The program ended shortly after her mother’s death and the following year her daughter died as well. She then sought refuge in her eldest son, José Luis, to whom she introduced astrology.

In 1963, she founded an astrology school in the back room of the Armenteros Bookshop, owned by Jesús Armenteros, a friend from her theosophical period, and began teaching the discipline with considerable success. The Escuela Cultura Astrológica (Astrological Culture School) was formally established in 1973, and she taught there until her death in Madrid on 19 December 1981. Her son took over the school’s direction.

In late December 1980, De Pablos appeared on national television RTVE in the programme "Predicciones para 1981", during which she presented her astrological forecasts for the upcoming year alongside her son José Luis. The broadcast is dated 28 December 1980.

Her poetic work remained mostly unpublished during her life and some of it was published after her death. Some verses in the first edition of Versos con faldas (1983) and a poem printed in 1992 in the magazine Espacio y Tiempo. Her editorial activity focused on the publication of astrology books, some co-authored with her son. Together they directed and edited the journal Cuadernos de Cultura Astrológica and the Anuario astrológico Alfonso X el Sabio.

== Works ==
- 1979 – Así nació el siglo XX. Astrología. Self-published.
- 1979 – Las comparaciones astrológicas. Self-published.
- 1981 – Principios de Astrología general. Fundamentos astronómicos de la carta astrológica (Vol. I). Luis Cárcamo Editor.
- 1982 – Anuario astrológico Alfonso X el Sabio, co-directed with her son.
- Three sonnets—La guardia de las espadas, La amortajadora, and Mendigo poeta—were included in the second anthology of Versos con faldas (2019).
- 2022 – La voz encontrada (poetry), edited by Fran Garcerá and Marta Porpetta. Torremozas, Madrid.

== Legacy ==
Regarding her poetic legacy, a memorial recital took place on 19 February 1982 at the Casa de Zamora in Madrid, with the participation of Gloria Fuertes, Adelaida Las Santas, and Alicia Altabella. A decade later, in February 1992, another tribute to the poet and astrologer was held with the participation of her Versos con faldas colleagues and her son.
