= Gabino-Alejandro Carriedo =

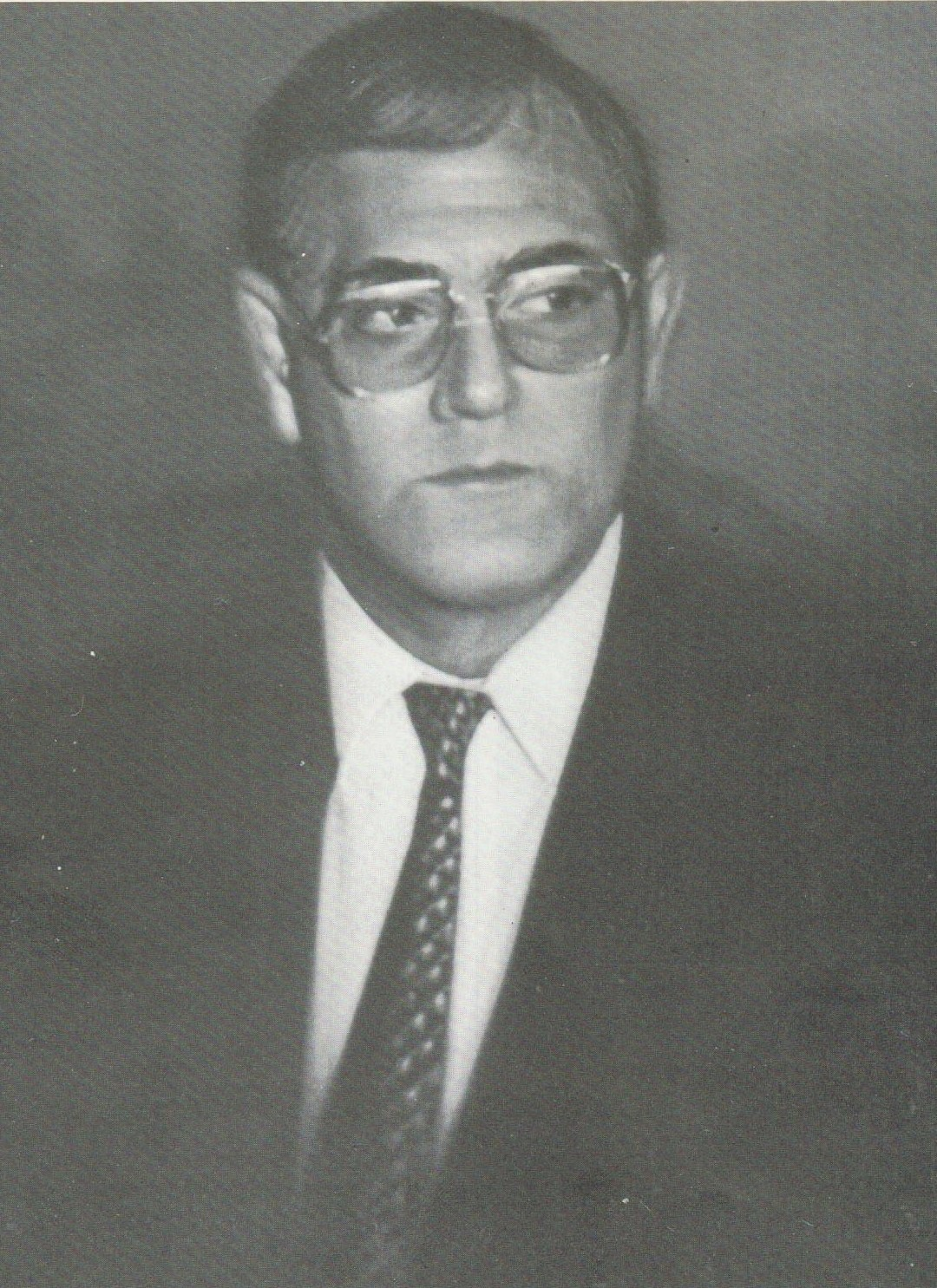
- Born: Gabino-Alejandro Carriedo; Palencia, Spain
- Died: San Sebastián de los Reyes, Community of Madrid, Spain
- Resting place: Cemetery of Nuestra Señora de los Ángeles, Palencia
- Occupations: Poet, writer, editor
- Years active: 1940s–1981
- Notable work: Poema de la condenación de Castilla (1946); El corazón en un puño (1961); Los lados del cubo (1973); Nuevo compuesto descompuesto viejo (1980)
- Movement: Postismo, Magic realism, Social poetry, Avant-garde

Gabino-Alejandro Carriedo (Palencia, 1923 – San Sebastián de los Reyes, 1981) was a Spanish poet and writer from Palencia whose work belongs entirely to the 20th century. He especially cultivated the poetic genre, publishing many of his books in literary magazines of the time and serving as editor of several of them.

== Biography ==
He later moved to Madrid, where he wrote works such as "La piña sespera", became associated with the Postismo movement led by Carlos Edmundo de Ory and Eduardo Chicharro Briones, and participated actively in this avant-garde movement.

In the 1950s he co-created, together with Ángel Crespo, magic realism in poetry, which they spread through magazines such as El Pájaro de Paja, Poesía de España, and Deucalión.

From 1960 onward his poetry turned toward social issues with books such as El corazón en un puño ("The Heart in a Fist") and Política agraria ("Agrarian Policy"). In the following decade, his work took a new turn toward the avant-garde with Los lados del cubo ("The Sides of the Cube"), a book influenced by Brazilian modernism and Constructivism.

In 1980 the publishing house Hiperión released an anthology of his work under the title Nuevo compuesto descompuesto viejo ("New Compound Decomposed Old").

He died suddenly on 6 September 1981 in San Sebastián de los Reyes, was cremated in Madrid, and his ashes were taken to the Cemetery of Nuestra Señora de los Ángeles in Palencia.

== Works ==
- Poema de la condenación de Castilla. Palencia: Merino, 1946.
- El cerco de la vida (1946–47), published posthumously in Segovia: Pavesas, 2002.
- La sal de Dios (1948). Unpublished until included in Poesía, 2006.
- La piña sespera (1948). Unpublished until included in Nuevo compuesto descompuesto viejo, 1980.
- La flor del humo (1949). Unpublished until included in Nuevo compuesto descompuesto viejo, 1980.
- Los animales vivos (1951), published in Carboneras de Guadazón: El toro de barro, 1966.
- Del mal, el menos. Madrid: El Pájaro de Paja, 1952.
- Las alas cortadas. Madrid: La piedra que habla, 1959.
- El corazón en un puño. Santander: La isla de los ratones, 1961.
- Política agraria. Madrid: Poesía de España, 1963.
- Los lados del cubo. Madrid: Poesía de España, 1973.
- Nuevo compuesto descompuesto viejo. Madrid: Hiperión, 1980. Preface by Antonio Martínez Sarrión.
- Lembranças e deslembranças (1970s), published posthumously in Cáceres: El Brocense, 1988. Edited and translated by Amador Palacios.
- El libro de las premoniciones (posthumous). Cuenca: El toro de barro, 1999. Preface by Carlos de la Rica.
- Poesía interrumpida (anthology). Madrid: Huerga & Fierro, 2006.
- Poesía (complete works). Valladolid: Fundación Jorge Guillén, 2006. Preface by Fanny Rubio.
- Sonetos. Palencia: Fundación Díaz Caneja, 2010. Introduction and selection by Mario Paz González.
- Prose. Twenty Stories and a Novella. Valladolid: Fundación Jorge Guillén, 2023. Introduction, selection, and notes by Mario Paz González.

== Additional references ==
- AYUSO, César Augusto. La poesía de Gabino-Alejandro Carriedo (historia, gramática y hermenéutica). Oviedo: Universidad de Oviedo, 1990.
- DOMINGO CALLE, Francisca. El constituyente imaginario en la obra poética de Gabino-Alejandro Carriedo. Madrid: Universidad Complutense, 2001.
- PALACIOS, Amador. Gabino-Alejandro Carriedo, su continente y su contenido. Palencia: Caja de Ahorros y Monte de Piedad, 1984.
- PAZ GONZÁLEZ, Mario. La obra literaria de Gabino-Alejandro Carriedo. León: Universidad de León, 2008.
- PALACIOS, Amador. La flor del humo (Autobiografía apócrifa de Gabino-Alejandro Carriedo). Madrid: Ediciones Vitrubio, 2015.
