= Félix Casanova de Ayala =

Spanish poet

Félix Casanova de Ayala (1915–1990) was a Spanish poet.
