= Maria Torres (activist) =

Filipino social activist

Maria Leonora Torres is a Filipino social activist who is the founder and president of We Care for Humanity (WCH), a Las Vegas-based nonprofit organization.

== Career ==
In 2011, Torres founded We Care for Humanity, a 501(c)(3) organization. In 2015, when it was based in Los Angeles, the organization had chapters in Malaysia, India, the Philippines and Nigeria, and organized the Global Official of Dignity (G.O.D.) Awards, an annual humanitarian awards ceremony held in New York.

By 2017, Torres was a special adviser to the director general of the Philippine Economic Zone Authority.

== Royal styles ==
Torres is a princess of the Royal House of Baloi, one of the four principalities of the historical Lanao confederation in the southern Philippines. She is also known as Queen of Maharlika and Princess of Calabarzon.
