= Manuel San Martín =

Manuel San Martín

Manuel San Martín (1881 in Distrito Federal, Mexico – March 25, 1965, in Distrito Federal, Mexico). A Captain in the Mexican Army and notable figure of the Mexican Revolution. He opposed corruption within the high ranks of his command in order to save the lives of prisoners wrongfully set for execution. He saved the lives of countless victims of the Mexican Revolution, where more than 2 million people lost their lives. He married Concepción Espinosa and they had ten children together.

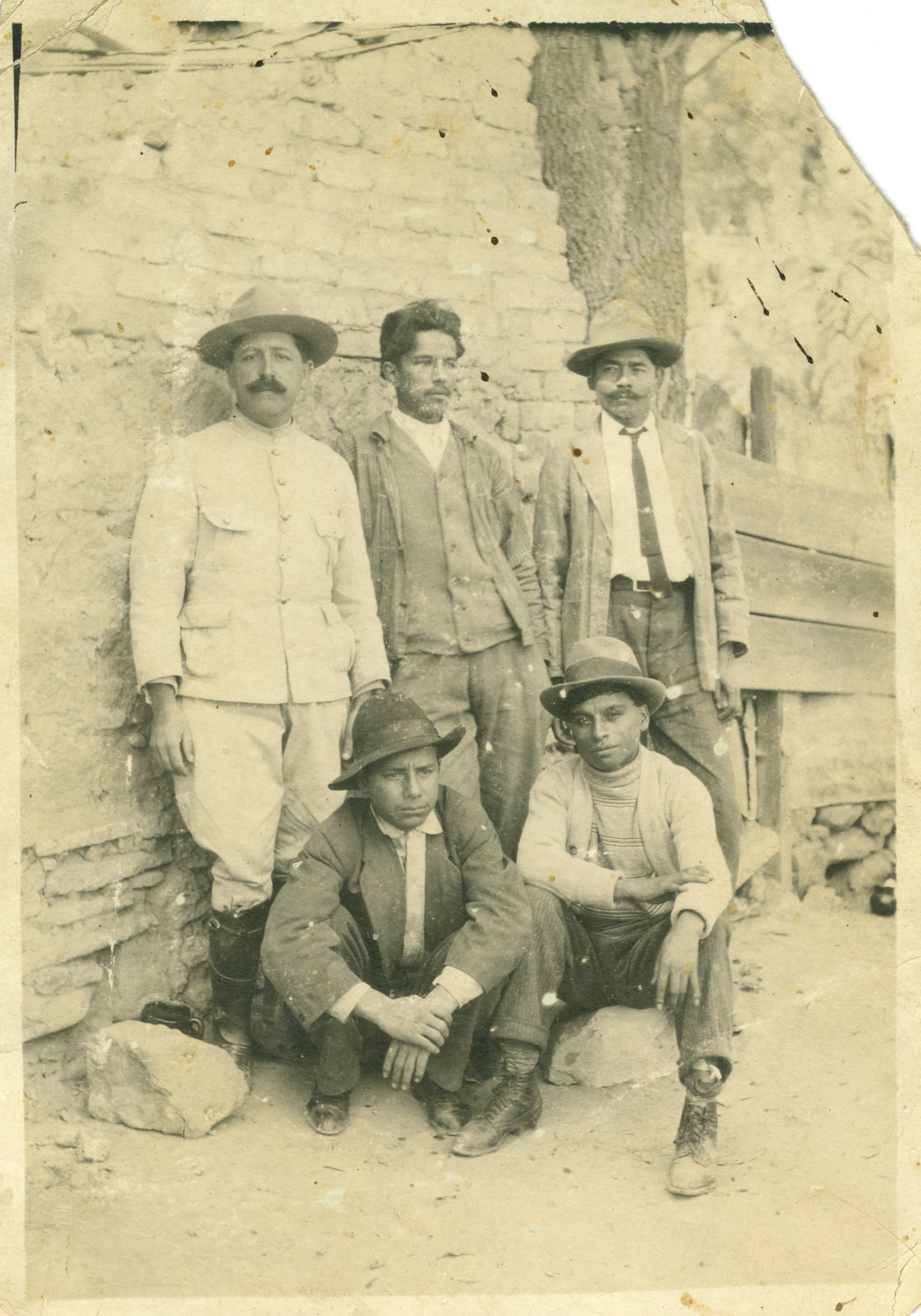

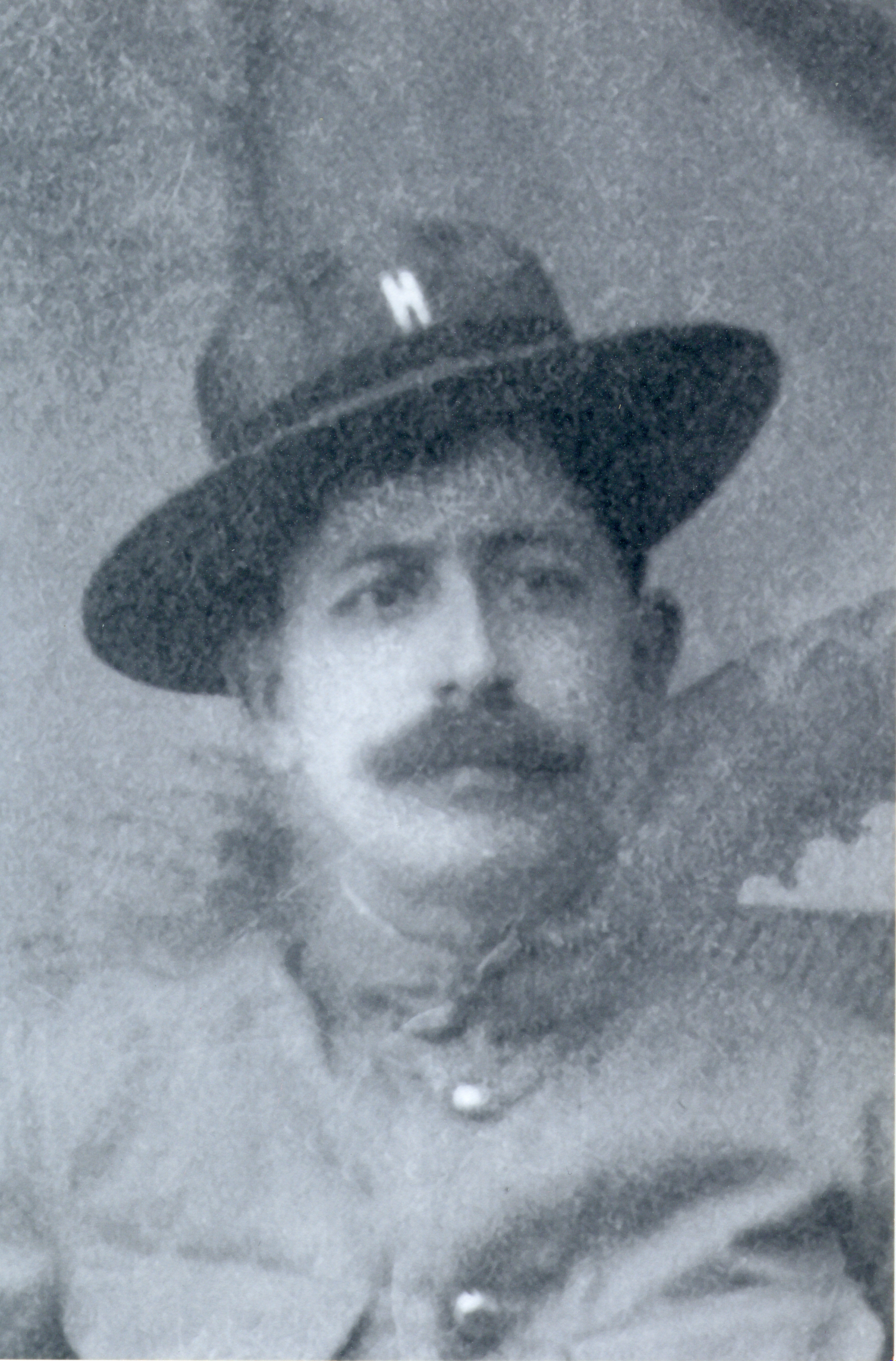
