= Gender roles in Francoist Spain =

Gender roles in Francoist Spain became more regressive following the end of the Spanish Civil War. Women, who had achieved some degree of liberation during the Second Republic, were forced back into the home. Misogyny and heteronormativity became linchpins in the new fascist Spain, underpinned by Hispanic eugenics. Under this system, anyone who did not adhere to state and religious mandated gender roles and who expressed any deviance from Roman Catholic sexual norms was considered by both church and state to be a sexual pervert.

Gender roles depended on whether or not a man or woman was married and had children. For married women, the role was to be a mother. For men, the role was to support the home. For unmarried women, gender roles were often more complex because of the economic necessity to work when gender roles strictly dictated that a woman's place should be exclusively inside the home. These gender roles would impact all aspects of life, including dating and marriage.

Modern Spanish womanhood conceptually entered Spain as a result of the emerging consumerist culture. This concept began the first major challenge to regime-mandated gender roles. Sección Feminina played a critical role in forcing female compliance with their gender roles, sanctioned by the state to do so. As these norms began to change in the 1960s and 1970s, the organization tried to change some to remain culturally relevant.

== Impact of the Civil War ==
The end of the Civil War, and the victory of fascist forces, saw the return of traditional gender roles in Spain. This included the unacceptability of women serving in combat roles in the military. Where gender roles were more flexible, it was often around employment issues where women felt an economic necessity to make their voices heard. It was also more acceptable for women to work outside the home, though the options were still limited to roles defined as more traditionally female. This included working as nurses, or in soup kitchens or orphanages. Overall though, the end of the Civil War proved a double loss for Republican women, as it first took away the limited political power and identities as women they had won during the Second Republic and it secondly forced them back into the confines of their homes. With strict gender norms back in place, women who had found acceptable employment prior and during the Civil War found employment opportunities even more difficult in the post-war period. Teachers who worked for Republican schools were often unable to find employment.

== Rational and Hispanic eugenics ==
Misogyny and heteronormativity were linchpins of fascism in Spain, where the philosophy revolved around patria and fixed gender roles that praised the role of strong male leadership. The state set up a battle between women, by encouraging women to define themselves as mothers and state patriots or as prostitutes who opposed the state. It was supported by Pope Pius XII's 1951 directive on the purpose of Christian marriage, which stated, "In accordance with the Creator's will, matrimony, as an institution of nature, has not as a primary and intimate end the personal perfection of the married couple but rather the procreation and upbringing of new life. ... One of the fundamental demands of the true moral order is the sincere acceptance of motherhood's function and duties." In the case of Spain, the Franco regime's imperative view was motherhood should only ever occur in the context of marriage.

Hispanic eugenics was pioneered by doctors like Antonio Vallejo Nájera and Gregorio Marañón. Antes que te cases was published by Nájera in 1946, with one part saying, "Racial decadence is the result of many things but the most important is conjugal unhappiness in the most prosperous and happy of homes. ... Eugenic precepts may avoid morbid offspring. ... It is impossible to maintain a robust race without a sound preparation of youth for marriage, through Catholic Morality. This little work is a minuscule contribution to the exaltation of the Fatherland." Marañón's 1921 Maternidad y feminismo, republished as a second edition in 1951, announced, "The difference between the sexes is insurmountable. Such difference emerges from the anatomical surface of each man and woman, and it goes to the deepest, darkest roots of life, to the home of the cells."

Anyone who did not fit into traditional gender norms and who expressed any deviance from Roman Catholic sexual norms was viewed as a sexual pervert. While some women quietly questioned their biologically determined place in society, male intellectuals provided arguments to support Francoist policies that were based on medical and biological sciences, along with anatomy and physiological studies.

The Second Vatican Council held from 1962 to 1965 assisted in reshaping Catholic discourse around the definition of womanhood. These conversations often found themselves in contradiction to traditional Francoist teachings.

== Gender specific roles ==
Male and female gender roles in Spain depended on whether or not each had children. This was a Francoist concept with roots going back to José Antonio Primo de Rivera's original Falangist ideas.

=== Women ===
The role of a woman in Francoist Spain was to be a mother. Questioning this role for women was tantamount to questioning the nature and rights of the state, and viewed as a subversive act. In Francoist Spain, women were not endowed by God with business ingenuity, nor the capacity to be involved in war. According to Falangist teachings, God made women for the home; to understand it, with its upkeep, was the way to measure a woman's worth and the place where women should always be content. Education for women was to be centered around the need to leave women in the home and outside full participation in society, for which they were deemed unsuitable.

The Elementary Education Act of 1945 was created specifically for the purpose of furthering gender roles by indoctrinating children in these roles at a young age. Girls were taught that their role was to become perfect housewives, that one of their most important roles was to remain faithful to their husbands, and that they should always delegate to and defer to men. Girls were taught that their future careers were to be middle-class housewives. Any other career choice would be dishonorable to her family.

The regime approved women's instruction manuals during the 1950s and 1960s, following the style of Spanish Baroque conduct manuals. Topics included the marriage market in Spain, and how to navigate it in religious, political and sexual contexts. In later periods, they highlighted the growing gender conflicts in the family.

One of women's roles in Francoist Spain was to educate Spanish children to prevent them from becoming maleducados (uneducated).

Much of the regime ideology around mothers applied to all Spanish women, but not always in the same way. It changed depending on the political alignment of the mother. "Red" mothers were considered disabled and afflicted with "psychological degeneration".

=== Men ===
Masculinity was defined by the regime around men's place in the workforce, and as drivers of the economy. Their job was to work in support of the family. The role of men was also to represent the family outside the home. Men were the authority figures in the Spanish household. Because women were excluded from the workforce and men were required to work to support the household, efforts were made by the regime to raise men's salaries to make sure they were high enough to support a household, while lowering women's salaries to make it less economically rational for women to work. By the mid-1950s, men would begin to face serious competition from women as economic pressures continued to force them into the workforce.

Men in Francoist Spain were taught they had a common enemy, and that enemy was the left, who were blamed for creating all the country's social ills in the previous century. The role of men was also to protect a woman's virginity.

=== Female heads of households ===
Women were allowed to take over the role of men in limited cases. One of these was when male heads of household were in prison. Another was when their husbands were killed, missing, lost or exiled as a result of their political affiliations. Other cases involved unmarried, younger women living on their own or widows of regime supporting men. In these cases, women were allowed to work in order to support their family. Broader stigmas against women in the workforce still made this difficult as these women represented a broad challenge to regime-imposed gender norms. Unmarried younger women faced the fewest social consequences. Widowed nationalist supporting women faced a little more discrimination than unmarried women. Red affiliated women faced much more extreme discrimination. Consequently, many women who were heads of household had to work in the black market as there were few opportunities in the regulated economy. This contributed to further repression of "red" women, and became a form of economic and political repression specifically aimed at women. Many had their property confiscated. Many were also raped. These women existed on a strange border, straddling both gender roles for men and women which the regime did not know how to handle.

"Red" women with husbands in prisons also straddled gender roles, contradicting leftist thinking. They often had to be heads of household, while serving as clandestine political operatives, connecting their male spouses to internal militants inside Spain and the international resistance. Facing the regime, they had to present themselves within the regime sanctioned definition while performing masculine tasks inside leftist political movements.

== Modern Western womanhood ==
In the 1950s, Spain started adopting a more consumerist economy. This would continue on into the 1960s and would play a role in introducing Spanish women to the new modern Western woman. This introduction would result in the eschewing of the concept of True Catholic Womanhood. By the 1960s, Francoist Spain had changed its definition of Catholic womanhood. Women were no longer only biological organisms existing for the sole purpose of procreation, but as beings for whom Spanish cultural norms remained. By the end of the 1960s, the destiny of women in Spain was changing as women increasingly began to express their dissatisfaction with state-imposed patriarchy. Their dissatisfaction would play a significant role in the later collapse of the regime following Franco's death.

== Dating and marriage ==
Because of regime definitions around acceptable womanhood involving motherhood, many young Spanish women in the Francoist period faced a race to get married at an early age. This would allow them to comply with gender norms and avoid criticism of being single and not contributing to the state. Spanish women were taught that it was acceptable for their boyfriends to have sex with foreign women, called suecas, as a way of preserving their own purity. Suecas were considered different than prostitutes because they were not affiliated with traditional brothels where men were historically introduced to sex. During the 1950s, when a woman married, the license process required her to be fingerprinted by the police.

== Sección Femenina ==
Sección Feminina (Women's Section) did all it could to subliminal quash female desires for independence in its support of regime sanctioned Falangist definitions of womanhood. Gender norms were reinforced by Sección Femenina de Falange. Opportunities to work, study or travel required women to take classes on cooking, sewing, childcare and the role of women before they were granted. If women did not take or pass these classes, they were denied these opportunities. A 28 December 1939 decree officially put the Women's Section of Falange in charge of preparing women for their role in the Spanish state as mothers and homemakers.

The Women's Section of the Falange represented the elite women of Spain. Pilar Primo de Rivera was viewed by many inside the regime as a critical player in successfully encouraging Franco to relax restrictions for women during the 1950s and 1960s.

The 1950s saw a reduction in the importance of the Women's Section as their role in shoring up the economy and producing propaganda for national unity was less important. In response, it switched to become more clearly a social welfare arm of the state. The organization lost much of its political influence and position within the Francoist structure. Its survival was largely because of involvement in education and because no other organization offered women of this period the same level of opportunities. During the 1960s and 1970s, the Women's Section helped to raise expectations of what was possible for women to accomplish by taking personal responsibility for their actions.

Schedule for housewife with husband and child by Sección Feminina in 1957
Weekday	6:00 - 7:30	7:30 - 9:00	9:00 - 9:45	9:45 - 10:45	10:45 - 12:00	12:00 - 12:30	12:30 - 13:00	13:00 - 14:00	14:15 - 17:00	17:15 - 17:30	17:30 - 19:00	19:00 - 20:00	20:30 - 21:00	20:30 - 21:00	21:00 - 22:00	22:00
Monday	Get up, make fire, prepare breakfast, prepare stew, beans, etc.	Fix bedroom. Personal hygiene. Send child to school.	Do shopping.	Clean house.	Prepare food. Collect child from school.	Eat with the family.	Tidy the kitchen.	Prepare clothing for washing. Take child to school.	Clean clothes. Leave them in bleach.	Collect child from school. Merienda.	Sewing.	Prepare dinner.	Dinner with the family.	Kitchen arrangement. Think about food for tomorrow. Put legumes in water.	Put child to bed.	Go to bed.
Tuesday	See above.	See above.	See above.	See above.	See above.	See above.	See above.	Rinse clothes. Take child to school.	Hang out the washing. Sewing.	See above.	See above.	See above.	See above.	See above.	See above.	See above.
Wednesday	See above.	See above.	See above.	See above.	See above.	See above.	See above.	Pick up clothes. Take child to school.	Review.	See above.	Sew a while. Do some reading.	See above.	See above.	See above.	See above.	See above.
Thursday	See above.	Arrange bedroom. There is no school.	Personal hygiene. Shopping.	See above.	Prepare food.	See above.	See above.	Iron clothes.	Iron delicates.	Prepare merienda. Go for a walk with the child, or to the children's section, if it rains.		See above.	See above.	See above.	See above.	See above.
Friday	See above.	Arrange kitchen.	See above.	School.	See above.	See above.	See above.	Clean and organize closet. Put away clothes.	Wash socks, stockings and kitchen towels.	Collect child from school. Merienda.	Go for a visit or to shop.	See above.	See above.	See above.	See above.	See above.
Saturday	See above.	Clean bedroom and bathroom. Take child to school.	Shopping.	See above.				Clean the whole kitchen.	Darn socks and stockings.	See above.	Shop for Sunday.	See above.	Bathe child.	Dinner and clean kitchen.	See above.	See above.
Sunday	Get up at 7, put fire and prepare breakfast and clean clothes.		Ready child to leave house, personal hygiene and prepare for mass at ten.	Light cleaning around the house and food preparation.		See above.	Tidy the kitchen.	Siesta.	In winter, a walk and merienda. In summer, sit and relax.	In summer, prepare dinner. In winter, family time.		In summer, a walk and dinner in the field. In winter, prepare and have dinner with the family.		Clean kitchen. Think about food for tomorrow.	See above.	See above.

== See also ==
- Women in Nazi Germany
- Gender roles in post-communist Central and Eastern Europe
