= Victoria Cirlot =

Spanish historian (born 1955)

Victoria Cirlot Valenzuela (born 1955), daughter of poet Juan Eduardo Cirlot, is a Spanish scholar of medieval culture and literature, philologist, translator and editor. She is a tenured professor of medieval literature and comparative literature at the Pompeu Fabra University in Barcelona, Celtic religion professor at the University of Barcelona, and professor of symbology at the Universitat Ramon Llull in the same city. She is co-editor of the collection El Árbol del Paraíso of Editorial Siruela (Madrid). She is also a founding member of the Institut Universitari de Cultura and coordinator of the research team of the Biblioteca Mystica et Philosophica Alois M. Haas. Cirlot is a member of the Institut Carl Gustav Jung Barcelona. Some of her fields are the study of mysticism, symbology and the history of religions, as well as aesthetics of reception.

Cirlot was born in Barcelona to the poet Juan Eduardo Cirlot, whose book A Dictionary of Symbols she edited, and which contains an epilogue by her. Her sister is fellow professor Lourdes Cirlot.

== Works ==
- Antología de textos de literaturas románicas (with A.M. Mussons AM, G. Oliver and I. Riquer)
- Figuras del Destino. Mitos y símbolos de la Europa Medieval
- Les cançons de l'amor de lluny de Jaufré Rudel
- Vidas y visiones de Hildegard von Bingen
- Hildegard von Bingen y la tradición visionaria de Occidente
- La mirada interior: escritoras místicas y visionarias en la Edad Media (with Blanca Garí)
- Mística y creación en el siglo XX (with Amador Vega)
- Cirlot en Vallcarca
- La visión abierta. Del mito del Grial al Surrealismo
