= Martín Santos Yubero =

Spanish photographer (1903–1994)

- Born: 1903; Madrid, Spain
- Died: 1994 (aged 90–91); Madrid, Spain
- Occupation: Photographer
- Known for: Photojournalism in Madrid during the Spanish Civil War and the post-war period

Martín Santos Yubero (Madrid, 1903 – Madrid, 1994) was a Spanish photographer, regarded as one of the most important photographers working in Madrid during the Spanish Civil War and the post-war period.

He began working as a press photographer for La Nación in 1927, and also worked for ABC, Diario de Madrid, Ya, Estampa and Luz. In the words of López Mondéjar:

“[Santos Yubero] was a politically accommodating man who did not take sides, and that allowed him to be everywhere.”

In 2010, a selection of his work was brought together in an exhibition of more than 160 images, organized by the Community of Madrid at Sala Alcalá 31.
