= Ángela Figuera Aymerich =

- Born: October 30, 1902; Bilbao, Spain
- Died: April 2, 1984 (aged 81); Madrid, Spain
- Spouse: Julio Figuera
- Children: Juan Ramón Figuera
- Writing career
- Genre: Poetry

Ángela Figuera Aymerich (October 30, 1902 in Bilbao – April 2, 1984 in Madrid) was a Basque and Spanish poet and writer.

== Early years ==
Angela was born in Bilbao, Spain into a middle class family, but due to her mother's poor health, Figuera spent much of her childhood raising her eight younger siblings. She attended primary school and went on to secondary school as one of five girls among one hundred boys. Despite her father's resistance, she studied literature at University in Valladolid.

After her father's death in 1930, Figuera, her mother and the family moved from Bilbao to Madrid. Figuera went on to the University of Madrid and graduated with a degree in philosophy and humanities and then passed the official exams to earn a permanent teaching position as Professor of Language and Literature at the Institutes of Huelvaat.

In 1932, she married Julio Figuera (d.1994), who would be her lifelong companion. Sadly, in 1935 she gave birth to a child who died at birth when extracted with forceps. Their second child, Juan Ramón, was born in Madrid during the war.

== Civil War ==
The Spanish Civil War was devastating to Figuera who lost her teaching position in 1936 because of her sympathies with Republican dissidents. Meanwhile, her husband enlisted in the Republican militias. She lamented the atmosphere of hate, retribution and injustice that became widespread in Spain during that time.

With the end of hostilities, she found employment at the National Library of Madrid.

== Later years ==
Figuera spurned the ideals of pure poetry and was the same age as members of the poetry group known as Generation of 1927 and should have been counted among them. Instead, because she did not publish until later in life, in 1948 (at about 46 years of age), she was considered a senior member of the Generation of 1936, a later group of poets.

Ángela died in Madrid on April 2, 1984, at 84 years of age. With her death, her husband Julio began his life-long campaign to keep her work from being forgotten. Because of his insistence, in 1986, Hiperión published the first edition of the Complete Works of Ángela Figuera Aymerich.

She continued to write "using humble words to write on issues that are still serious today: she wrote about injustices, about freedom in the twentieth century, about freedom crushed a thousand times, about the child who died at birth, and also about women's equality and rights," said Juan Mari Aburto, the mayor of Bilbao, at a dedication held at the Ángela Figuera Institute in 2018.

She has been remembered by author Jose Ramón Zabala as "a real hinge between Basque and Madrid cultural circles."

== Selected works ==
Here is some of her published work. More can be found online.

- Mujer de barro, (1948)
- Soria pura (1949)
- Vencida por el ángel (1951)
- El grito inútil (1952)
- Los días duros (1953)
- Víspera de la vida (1953)
- Belleza cruel (1958)
- Toco la tierra. Letanías (1962)
- Obras completas (1986)
- Cuentos tontos para niños listos (1979)
- Canciones para todo el año (1984; posthumous)
