= Juan Eduardo Cirlot =

Spanish poet and polymath

Juan Eduardo Cirlot Laporta (9 April 1916 in Barcelona – 11 May 1973) was a Spanish poet, art critic, hermeneutist, mythologist, and musician.

== Biography ==
Cirlot was born in Barcelona to Juan Cirlot and Maria Laporta. There he matriculated high school from the College of the Jesuits and worked in a customs agency and the Banco Hispanoamericano while also studying music.

In 1937, he was mobilized to fight for the Second Spanish Republic. In early 1940, he was mobilized again, but this time by the pro-Franco side. He was in Zaragoza until 1943; there he frequented the city's intellectual and artistic circles and associated with the painter Alfonso Buñuel—brother of Luis Buñuel—with whom he translated the poems of Paul Éluard, André Breton, and Antonin Artaud. During this period, he read many avant-garde art books and magazines.

In the summer of 1943, he returned to Barcelona to work in the Banco Hispanoamericano. He met novelist Benítez de Castro, who introduced him in the media as an art critic. On 11 August 1947, he married Gloria Valenzuela, then began to work in the editorial bookstore "Argos". He composed music and worked with the artists of the Dau al Set, a Catalan group including, among others, Antoni Tàpies, Modest Cuixart or Arnau Puig. On 21 October 1948, he premiered his Preludio in the Ateneu Barcelonès.

In 1949, his daughter Lourdes was born, and he became a writer for the Dau al Set magazine journal. In October, he traveled to Paris and met André Breton. Igor Stravinsky, his first treatise, was published. In 1951, he began to work in the Gustavo Gili publishing house, where he remained until his death. That year, he also began to collect antique swords.

Between 1949 and 1954, in Barcelona, Cirlot befriended and worked with the German ethnologist and musicologist Marius Schneider, who initiated him into the science of symbology. José Gudiol Ricart likewise introduced him to the study of Gothic art. His work El Ojo en la Mitología: su simbolismo [The Eye in Mythology: Its Symbolism] was published in 1954. His daughter Victoria was born the same year, and he helped found the Academia del Faro de San Cristóbal.

In 1958, he began to write collaborations, such as Goya, Papeles de Son Armadans, and published, through the publishing house Luis Miracle, his most famous and international work, the Diccionario de símbolos tradicionales. Years of intense activity as a critic and lecturer followed.

In 1962, his father died and he published his dictionary in English under the title A Dictionary of Symbols, with a prologue by Herbert Read. In 1963, he severed ties with Dau al Set member Antoni Tàpies. In 1966, he saw Franklin Schaffner's film The War Lord, which had a great impact on his poetic work.

Cirlot fell ill with pancreatic cancer in 1971, for which he underwent surgery on 11 May 1973. He died that day in his home on calle Herzegovino in Barcelona.

== Analysis ==
Beginning in the 1940s, Cirlot ascribed himself to the French Surrealist school and to Dadaism, soon assuming a very broad-horizoned spiritualist tradition of universal longing (Kabbalah, Sufism, and Eastern studies). From this was sparked the interest in symbology that permeated all his literary activity and his important work as an art critic. As a member of the Dau al Set school, he was a collaborator of Joan Brossa and Antoni Tàpies. He conducted comprehensive studies on medieval symbology and hermeneutics, accruing an impressive collection of swords, and his prolific and varied poetic output—more than fifty books—remained independent of the trends that dominated the poetry of the postwar period because of their darkness and hermetism; nevertheless, his impact has never ceased to be reevaluated through continuous revisions, reeditions, appearances of unpublished works, and tributes. The best-known part of his work is the phase of his poetic evolution centered in the actress Rosemary Forsyth, who played Bronwyn in the Franklin Schaffner film The War Lord (1965) and inspired the permutational phase of his poetry.

As a poet his writing ranges from playful invitations and lexical juggling acts within a general elegiac tone. There are echoes of avant-garde fantasy.

Cirlot also cultivated aphorism in his book Del no mundo (1969), in which his thought can be traced back to its sources in Nietzsche and Lao Tse. In 1986 El mundo del objeto a la luz del surrealismo was published unedited. Written in 1953, it went beyond the conceptual trends of the previous decades and continues to be an essential reference for professors and students of the universe of the work of art. In 1988 88 sueños, a complete collection of the dreams transcribed by Cirlot published partially in the Catalan journal Dau al Set, was published, clearly showing the importance that the Surrealist school had on his formation.

As a scholar, Cirlot is known internationally from his Dictionary of Symbols, which continues to be successfully reissued in the wake of symbologists like Carl Gustav Jung, Mircea Eliade, Gaston Bachelard, René Guénon, Gilbert Durand, and Paul Diel. One reviewer in 1962 called the book "a momentous contribution to symbology".

== Works ==
=== Poetry ===
- Canto de la Vida muerta [Song of the Living Dead] (1946)
- Donde las lilas crecen [Where the Lilacs Grow] (1946)
- Cuarto canto de la vida muerta y otros fragmentos [Fourth Song of the Living Dead and Other Fragments] (1961)
- Regina tenebrarum [Queen of the Shadows] (1966)
- Bronwyn (1967)
- Cosmogonía [Cosmogony] (1969)
- Orfeo (1970)
- 44 sonetos de amor [44 Love Sonnets] (1971)
- Variaciones fonovisuales [Audiovisual Variations] (1996)
- En la llama. Poesía (1943–1959) [In the Flame: Poetry (1943–1959)] (2005)

=== Treatises ===
- Diccionario de los ismos [Dictionary of -isms] (1949)
- Ferias y atracciones [Fairs and Attractions] (1950)
- El arte de Gaudí [The Art of Gaudí] (1950)
- La pintura abstracta [Abstract Painting] (1951)
- El estilo del siglo XX [20th Century Style] (1952)
- Introducción al surrealismo [Introduction to Surrealism] (1953)
- El mundo del objeto a la luz del surrealismo [The World of the Object to the Light of Surrealism] (1953)
- El Ojo en la Mitología: su simbolismo [The Eye in Mythology: Its Symbolism] (1954)
- El espíritu abstracto desde la prehistoria a la Edad Media [The Abstract Spirit from Prehistory to the Middle Ages] (1965)
- Diccionario de símbolos [A Dictionary of Symbols] (1958)
- Del no mundo : Aforismos [From No World: Aphorisms] (1969)
- 88 sueños; Los sentimientos imaginarios y otros artículos [88 Dreams: Imaginary Feelings and Other Articles] (1988)
- Confidencias literarias [Literary Secrets] (1996)

== Bibliography ==
- Juan Eduardo Cirlot, Diccionario de los Ismos, Ediciones Siruela: Madrid, 2006. ISBN 84-9841-024-X
- —, Diccionario de Símbolos, Ediciones Siruela: Madrid, 2003 (10ª edición). ISBN 84-7844-352-5
- Dolores Manjón-Cabeza Cruz, Thomas Schmitt: "Mi voz en el sonido de tu luz. Estructuras musicales en la poesía de Juan-Eduardo Cirlot", Bulletin of Spanish Studies, 83, vol. 4, 2006, 523 - 539.
