= Literary circle =

Group of students who discuss literature

A literary circle or coterie, according to The Oxford Dictionary of Literary Terms, is a "small group of writers (and others) bound together more by friendship and habitual association than by a common literary cause or style that might unite a school or movement. The term often has pejorative connotations of exclusive cliquishness".

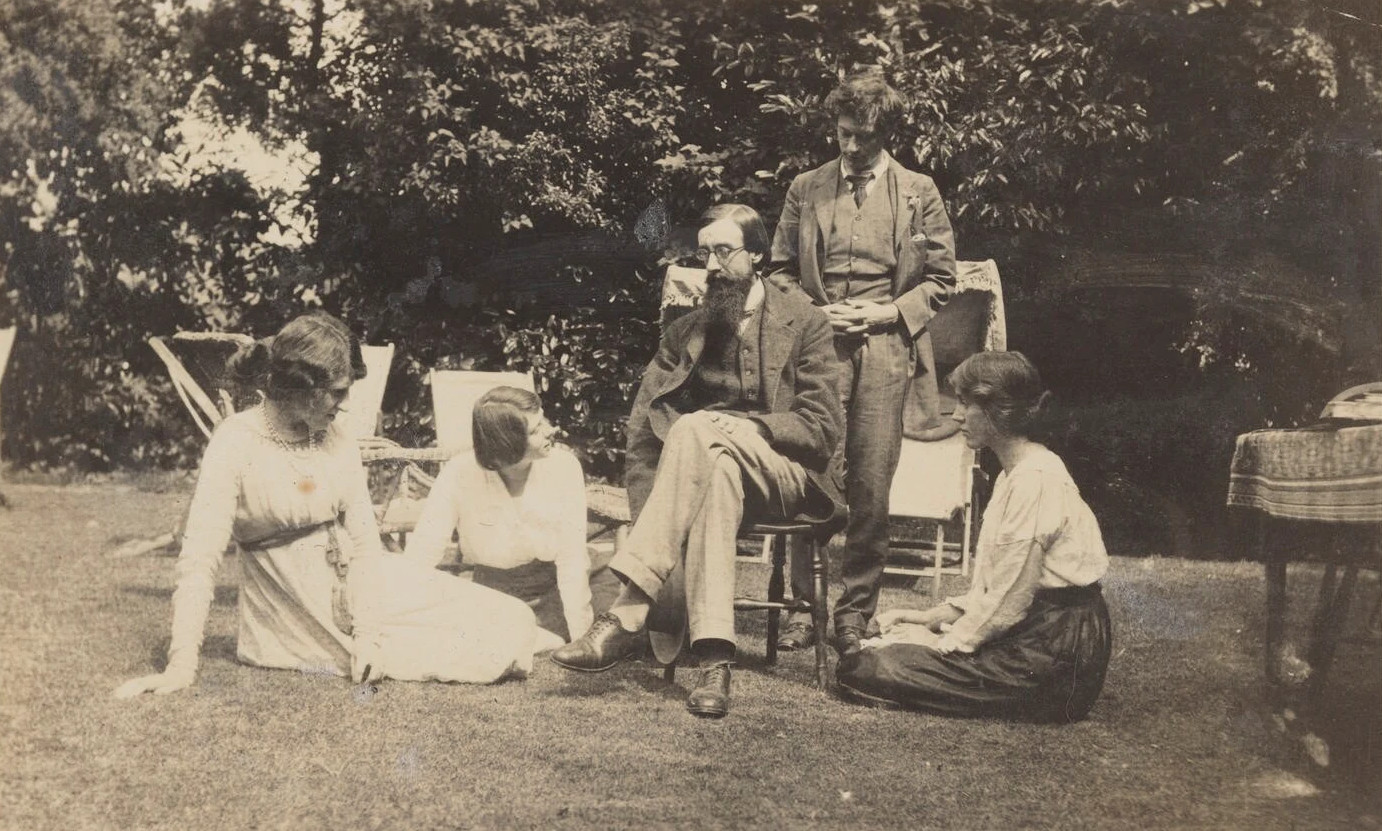
Some Bloomsbury members.

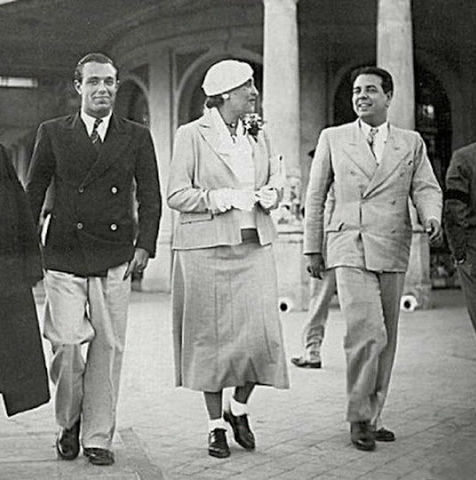
Adolfo Bioy Casares, Victoria Ocampo and Jorge Luis Borges in Mar del Plata in 1935. They were all members of the Florida Group

A literary circle differs from a writing circle, in that the latter usually includes only writers and the focus is on the process of writing. A literary circle also differs from a literary society, in that the latter need not contain any writers; members of a literary society come together to discuss or celebrate literary works or authors.

Famous or noteworthy examples include:

- Wilton Circle, UK, 16th-century group centred on Mary Sidney
- The Muiderkring, Netherlands, early 17th century
- Streatham Worthies, UK, late 18th century
- Literary Salon, Argentina, 1830s, which included the President of Argentina, Domingo Faustino Sarmiento and Juan Bautista Alberdi, the main thinker behind the Constitution of Argentina
- Wuppertal poets' circle, Germany, 1850s
- Marston's coterie, UK, 1880s
- The Bloomsbury Group, UK, c. 1907 to 1930
- The Mutual Admiration Society, UK, 1910s
- Whitechapel Boys, UK, early 20th century
- Algonquin Roundtable, USA, 1919–1929
- Florida Group, Argentina, 1920s, which included Jorge Luis Borges
- Boedo Group, Argentina, 1920s
- Stratford-on-Odéon, France, 1920s
- El Floridita literary circle, Cuba, 1920s, which included Ernest Hemingway
- The Harlem Renaissance, USA, 1920s and 1930s
- The Inklings, UK, c. 1930s and 1940s
- South Side Writers Group, USA, 1930s and 1940s
- Budh Sabha, India, 1932–present
- Misty poets, China, 1970s to 1990s

== See also ==
- Literary society
