= Gloria Fuertes =

Spanish poet and author

Gloria Fuertes García
- Born: 28 July 1917; Madrid, Spain
- Died: 27 November 1998 (aged 81); Madrid, Spain
- Occupations: Poet, short story writer, playwright, children's book writer
- Writing career
- Period: 1934–1998
- Notable works: Un globo, dos globos, tres globos Las tres reinas magas El hada acaramelada
- Movement: Postism

Gloria Fuertes García (28 July 1917 – 27 November 1998) was a Spanish poet, author of children's literature, and regular participant in children's television shows. She was part of the post-war literary movement of postismo, and a member of the Generation of '50. Her work focused on gender equality, pacifism, and environmentalism.

== Early life ==
Fuertes was born on 28 July 1917 in Madrid, Spain. Her mother was a seamstress and maid, and her father was a beadle. She attended the Institute of Vocational Education of Women, where she studied shorthand, typing, and childcare. She started crafting and illustrating stories at the age of five. Fuertes published her first poem at 14, Niñez, Juventud, Vejez (Childhood, Youth, Old Age). At 17, she composed her first book of poetry, Isla Ignorada, published in 1950. In 1934, she started working as an accountant and secretary, and she continued writing children's stories, plays, and poetry.

== Career ==
Between 1940 and 1953, Fuertes' work began appearing in children's magazines, such as Pelayos, Chicos, Chicas, Chiquitito; in children's books, such as Flechas y Pelayos (Maravillas); and in the newspaper Arriba, which published the comic strip "Coletas and Pelines".

Together with Maria Dolores and Adelaida Lasantas, Fuertes founded the group "Verses in Skirts" in 1951. The group organized concerts and poetry readings at bars and local cafes, and collaborated on magazines such as Directions, Spanish Poetry and Straw Bird. Between 1950 and 1954, the group worked with Antonio Gala, Julio Mariscal, and Rafael Mir to create and direct the poetry magazine Archer.

From 1955 to 1960, Fuertes studied library science and English at the International Institute. In 1961, she received a Fulbright scholarship in the United States to teach Spanish literature at Bucknell University. Later, she taught at Mary Baldwin University, Bryn Mawr College, and the International Institute until 1963. In 1972, she received a scholarship from the Juan March Foundation for Children's Literature.

In the mid-1970s, she was involved in various children's programs such as TVE, Siendo Un Globo, Dos Globos, Tres Globos y La Cometa Blanca and Martes y Trece.

== Literary work ==
Fuertes' poetry has a colloquial tone, often dealing with everyday objects or events, and universal issues such as love, pain, death, and loneliness. Her works are known for containing metaphors and linguistic games, which give her poems a musicality and cadence close to spoken language.

The influence of the postismo movement, which began in response to the Spanish Civil War, is shown in Fuertes' use of humour. The Spanish Civil War left a deep impression on Fuertes, and her anti-war stance and the influence of the subsequent postismo movement shows in her poetry through her use of ironic humor and protest against the absurdity of civilization. Fuertes said, "Without the tragedy of war, I might never have written poetry."

Critics have praised Fuertes for her "folksy and deliberately fresh orality", and for "open[ing] the poetic space" of post-war Spain to the concerns of women and the working class.

== Gender and sexuality ==
Fuertes never concealed the fact that she was a lesbian, despite the attitudes of the Franco dictatorship.

Much of Fuertes' work deals with women's rights and questions the gender roles in Francoist Spain. Her 1978 Three Wise Queens: Melchora, Gaspara, y Baltasara, in which the Three Wise Men cannot go to Bethlehem and are replaced by their wives, has become a classic of children's literature in Spain.

== Death and legacy ==
Fuertes died of lung cancer on 27 November 1998, and was buried in the South Cemetery in Madrid. In 2001, her remains were transferred to Madrid's Cemetery of La Paz of Alcobendas. She left her fortune to a Catholic orphanage.

On 28 July 2016, Google celebrated her 99th birthday with a Google Doodle.

== Work ==
=== Children's books ===
==== Poetry ====
- Canciones para niños (1956)
- Villancicos (1956)
- Cangura para todo (1968). Honorable Mention in the Hans Christian Andersen prize of Children's Literature.
- Don Pato y Don Pito (1970)
- Aurora, Brígida y Carlos (1970)
- La pájara pinta (1972)
- "La Oca Loca" (1977)
- El camello cojito (1978)
- El hada acaramelada (1973)
- La gata chundarata y otros cuentos (1974)
- El dragón tragón (1978)
- La momia tiene catarro (1978)
- El libro loco. De todo un poco (1981)
- El perro que no sabía ladrar (1982)
- El abecedario de don Hilario (1983)
- El burro y la escuela (1987)
- Trabalenguas para que se trabe tu lengua (1988)
- El cocinero distraído (1994)

==== Theatre ====
- La princesa que quería ser pobre (1942)
- El chinito Chin-cha-té (1955)
- Petra, un señor pregunta por ti (1970)
- Las tres reinas magas (1978)

==== Television ====
- Un globo, dos globos, tres globos
- La mansión de los Plaff
- La cometa blanca
- Big Vand
- Los pequeños niños atacan de nuevo

=== Adult literature ===
- Isla ignorada (1950)
- Antología y poemas del suburbio (1954)
- Aconsejo beber hilo (1954)
- Todo asusta Caracas (1958). Primera mención del Concurso Internacional de Poesía Lírica Hispana
- Que estás en la tierra (1962)
- Ni tiro, ni veneno, ni navaja (1965). Premio Guipúzcoa
- Poeta de guardia (1968)
- Cómo atar los bigotes del tigre (1969). Accésit premio Vizcaya
- Antología poética (1950–1969)
- Sola en la sala (1973)
- Cuando amas aprendes geografía (1973)
- Obras incompletas (1980)
- Historia de Gloria: (amor, humor y desamor) (1983)
- Mujer de verso en pecho (1983)
- Pecábamos como ángeles (1997)
- Glorierías (1999)
- Es difícil ser feliz una tarde (2005)
- El Rastro (2006) Relatos
- Se beben la luz (2008)
- Los brazos desiertos (2009)
- El caserón de la loca (2010) (theatre)
- Poemas prácticos más que teóricos (2011)
