= Amanecer (newspaper) =

Defunct Spanish Newspaper

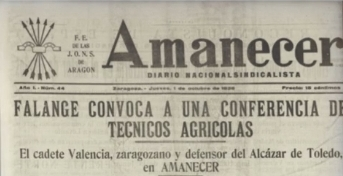
- Type: Daily Newspaper
- Owner: Cadena de Prensa del Movimiento
- Founded: August 11, 1936
- Ceased publication: June 17, 1979
- Political alignment: Francoism
- Language: Spanish
- City: Zaragoza
- Country: Spain
- ISSN: 2487-7824
- OCLC number: 1142938885

Amanecer was a Spanish newspaper published in Zaragoza between 1936 and 1979.

== History ==
The newspaper Amanecer was founded in August 1936, following the outbreak of the Spanish Civil War. Its first issue appeared on August 11, 1936, under the subtitle "Diario nacional-sindicalista" (National-Syndicalist Daily). It was initially published at the facilities of the Diario de Aragón, which had been seized by the Falange Española de las JONS at the beginning of the conflict. In its early days, it was directed by the Falangist journalist and historian Maximiano García Venero. Later, the newspaper became the property of FET y de las JONS, and during the Francoist dictatorship, it was integrated into the so-called "Cadena de Prensa del Movimiento."

However, Amanecer never enjoyed high sales among the population. By the mid-1970s, it was one of the most unprofitable newspapers in the Cadena de Prensa del Movimiento chain—by then it had accumulated losses of almost 25 million pesetas— a situation that led to its closure being proposed as early as 1975. After Franco's death, it was incorporated into the state-owned entity Medios de Comunicación Social del Estado (MCSE), but the situation continued to worsen. By 1979, it had accumulated losses of almost 66 million pesetas, and its daily circulation was only 2,267 copies. This situation led the government to decree its closure in mid-1979.

== Directors ==
The newspaper's management included Maximiano García Venero, Ubaldo Pozas Vidal, Casimiro Romero Porta, Luis Climent Cicujano, José Fernández Aguirre, Maximino Sastre del Blanco, Dámaso Santos, Ulpiano Vigil-Escalera, Francisco Villalgordo Montalbán, Ignacio Catalán, Antonio Muñoz Mompeón, and Ángel Bayod Monterde.

== Bibliography ==
- Aróstegui, Julio (1988). History and memory of the Civil War.
- De las Heras, Carlos (2000). The press of the movement and its advertising management, 1936-1984 (PDF). University of Malaga. ISBN 84-7496-771-6.
- Calamai, Natalia (1979). Commitment in the Poetry of the Spanish Civil War. Laia Editorial.
- Iturriaga Barco, Diego (2013). Tauste in its History. Proceedings of the XII Conference on the History of Tauste.
- Sánchez Rada, Juan (1996). Press of the movement to socialism: 60 years of computer dirigisme.
- Sepúlveda Sauras, María Isabel (2005). Tradition and modernity: art in Zaragoza in the 1950s. University Presses of Zaragoza.
