= Pueblo (newspaper) =

Spanish newspaper (1940–1984)

- Masthead of Pueblo (Pueblo: Diario del Trabajo Nacional), 1958.
- Type: Evening newspaper
- Format: Broadsheet
- Owner: Organización Sindical (Vertical Syndicates)
- Founder: National Delegation of Syndicates (Delegación Nacional de Sindicatos)
- Publisher: National Delegation of Syndicates (1940–c. 1977); Medios de Comunicación Social del Estado (c. 1977–1984)
- Editor: Jesús Ercilla (founding director); Juan Aparicio López (1946–1951); Emilio Romero (1952–1974); José Antonio Gurriarán (1983–1984)
- Founded: 17 June 1940
- Ceased publication: 17 May 1984
- Language: Spanish
- Headquarters: Madrid, Spain

Pueblo: Diario del Trabajo Nacional (English: The People: Daily of National Labor) was a Spanish newspaper published in the evening during the period of the Francoist dictatorship. The paper was owned by the regime's vertical syndicates, and at one point it became one of the three most important newspapers in Francoist Spain. Most of its content focused on crime reports and sports.

== History ==
During the brief period in which Gerardo Salvador Merino headed the Delegación Nacional de Sindicatos (National Syndicates Delegation; DNS), a trade-union newspaper was created in April 1940 which would take final shape two months later under the name Pueblo, initially under the authority of the Delegación Nacional de Prensa y Propaganda (National Press and Propaganda Delegation).

The newspaper was set up in the former offices of the socialist daily Claridad, and in fact initially used its equipment. The first editor was the Falangist physician Jesús Ercilla. Its first issue appeared on 17 June 1940. In its early years it had a circulation of around 25,000 copies. The paper employed acclaimed sports journalist Ramón de la Torre, who reportedly raised the standards of football coverage by writing on the second and third divisions in what was popularly dubbed the "División la Torre", a reference to his surname.

A later order of November 1942 guaranteed significant autonomy to the syndicalist propaganda apparatus and effective control over it by the DNS—a practice begun under Salvador Merino that now received legal sanction. During the years of the Second World War, the paper maintained a pro-Nazi Germany editorial line, as did Arriba, the flagship paper of the Falangist press. In 1948, a resolution of the Falangist Movement—dated 16 January 1948—established that the paper would come under the direct authority of the National Syndicates Delegation. Between 1946 and 1951 the paper was directed by Juan Aparicio López.

From 1952 to 1974 the editor was Emilio Romero Gómez, (Note: Except for a brief interval between 1954 and 1956.) whose columns—illustrated with a rooster—became popularly known as the "gallitos." Under his leadership Pueblo became one of the most widely read papers of Francoist Spain. In these years the daily reached a distribution of 200,000 copies, becoming the third newspaper with the largest national circulation—behind ABC and La Vanguardia Española. In the first half of 1972, the management considered launching different regional editions, a project that was met with hostility by the regional press. Despite being widely read and featuring well-known authors, it was often likened to the popular European tabloid press of the time.

A highly subjective description of Pueblo by the journalist Jesús Pardo judged all the newsroom's professionals by the same standard; Pardo himself served as London correspondent from the 1950s onward in the 20th century:

"The newsroom of Pueblo consisted of rejects. A mere Barea-like back office whose inhabitants neither knew how to write nor had any dream other than multiple salaries. Journalism for them was a simple transfer of propaganda, and they did not even bother to make it digestible for their readers. They lived in fear of angering any of the multiple authorities—civil, military, religious—or the numerous guilds that fenced off their plots against criticism from the rest of the country. Second- and even third-rate union leaders, and ministers and bosses of the single party, appropriated entire pages of the newspaper for their most trifling speeches or gratuitous statements; and woe betide the typo that disturbed the flow of their periods, because the next day the speech had to be reprinted in full with emphatic apologies. [...] Quotation marks were a most handy resource to give a roguish or sinister tone to whatever censorship or fear prevented saying clearly."

Between 1960 and 1977 the paper had a regional edition for Andalusia (called Sur/Oeste), directed until mid-1975 by the Sevillian journalist Manuel Benítez Salvatierra. It was later directed by Manuel Lorente. This section continued until its disappearance on 16 January 1977. In the early 1970s it ran a youth supplement titled El Cuco.

With the onset of the Transition and the disappearance of the Vertical Syndicate, the daily was incorporated into the so-called Medios de Comunicación Social del Estado ("State Social Communication Media"), albeit as a distinct unit. In the following years Pueblo faced evident difficulties against increasingly strong competition and tried to stem the loss of many of its former readers. Citing heavy losses, Javier Solana, then Minister of Culture in the socialist government of Felipe González, ordered its closure in 1984. The last issue appeared on 17 May 1984. Many of its journalists, led by Emilio Romero, took part in the magazine La Jaula. This project failed, as did Romero's later attempt to revive El Imparcial.

According to Arturo Pérez-Reverte:

"That bohemian, unrepeatable newsroom, where the best journalists in Spain gathered—the brightest and least scrupulous I ever met—capable of bribing, stealing, lying and selling their own mother in exchange for a big report, a scoop or a front-page byline. (...) Pueblo was a patio de Monipodio teeming with life and extravagant characters; some would have made the boldest film by José Luis Cuerda look pale. We had everything: pretty girls, smart girls, girls who were both smart and pretty, wise men, swindlers, whores, gunmen, geniuses, lesbians, poets, bullfighting folk both corrupt and incorrupt, homosexuals, philosophers, scoundrels, cardsharps, pimps, drunks, habitual criminals and even two murderers."

In 2023 the journalist Jesús Fernández Úbeda published Nido de piratas. La fascinante historia del diario 'Pueblo', a biography of the newspaper with numerous interviews with many who worked there.

== Staff and contributors ==
Journalists who worked at Pueblo included Andrés Aberasturi, Yolanda Alba, Evaristo Acevedo, Serafín Adame Martínez, Jesús María Amilibia, José Luis de Avendaño, José Luis Balbín, Gonzalo de Bethencourt y Carvajal, Fernando Cabezas (cartoonist), Raúl Cancio, José María Carrascal, Gonzalo Carvajal, Mery Carvajal, Antonio Casado Alonso, Juan Luis Cebrián (who joined as editor-in-chief), Manuel Cruz (its penultimate editor), Manuel Blanco Tobío, (Note: Author of numerous reports, he was Pueblo's correspondent in New York City and at the UN between 1956 and 1966.) Elvira Daudet, José Luis Delgado García, Antonio Domínguez Olano, Antonio Echarri, Javier Figuero, the cartoonist Forges, José María García, Eduardo García Rico, Antonio A. Giménez Barranco, Juan Girón Roger, Francisco González de Reguera, José Antonio Gurriarán (its last editor), Jesús Hermida, José Luis Martín Prieto (business editor-in-chief), Germán Lopezarias, Juan Ramón Lucas, Manuel Marlasca Cosme, Marino Gómez-Santos, Tico Medina, Felipe Mellizo, Julio Merino, Francisco Minaya, Manuel Molés, Rosa Montero, Javier de Montini, José Luis Moreno-Ruiz, Pilar Narvión, Alfonso Navalón, Julia Navarro, José Luis Navas, Jesús Pardo de Santayana, the famous Spanish writer Arturo Pérez-Reverte, Juan Pla, José Antonio Plaza, Raúl del Pozo, Juan Francisco Puch, Javier Reverte, Carmen Rigalt, Vicente Romero Ramírez, Martín Semprún, Vicente Talón Ortiz, Ramón de la Torre (la Torre), Pablo Torres, Rosa Villacastín, Yale, and Alfonso Zapater, among others.

== Bibliography ==
- Bardavío, Joaquín; Sinova, Justino (2000). Todo Franco. Franquismo y antifranquismo de la A a la Z. Barcelona: Plaza & Janés.
- Bernardo, José (2009). De Azorín a Umbral: Un siglo de periodismo literario español. Madrid: Netbiblo.
- Bowen, Wayne H. (2000). Spaniards and Nazi Germany: Collaboration in the New Order. University of Missouri Press. ISBN 978-0-8262-6282-0.
- Crespo, Lucía; Villena, Rafael (2007). Fotografía y patrimonio. Universidad de Castilla-La Mancha.
- Crespo de Lara, Pedro (2014). Triunfó la libertad de prensa. Esfera de los Libros.
- De las Heras Pedrosa, Carlos (2000). La prensa del movimiento y su gestión publicitaria, 1936–1984. Universidad de Málaga. doi:10.5281/zenodo.2603453.
- García Galindo, Juan Antonio (2002). La comunicación social durante el franquismo. Diputación Provincial de Málaga.
- Juliá, Santos; García Delgado, José Luis; Jiménez, Juan Carlos; Fusi, Juan Pablo (2007). La España del siglo XX. Marcial Pons Historia.
- Pardo, Jesús (2009). Autorretrato sin retoques. Barcelona: Anagrama.
- Pareja Olcina, María (2013). El periódico Mediterráneo durante la transición española (1975–1982). Castellón de la Plana: Universidad Jaime I.
- Pozuelo, Eduardo Martín de; Ellakuría, Iñaki (2008). La guerra ignorada: los espías españoles que combatieron a los nazis. Barcelona: Random House Mondadori. ISBN 978-84-8306-768-0.
- Sánchez Rada, Juan (1996). Prensa, del movimiento al socialismo: 60 años de dirigismo informático. Fragua.
- Sevillano Calero, Francisco (1998). Propaganda y medios de comunicación en el franquismo (1936–1951). Universidad de Alicante.

Additional bibliography

- Naseiro Raimundo, Ana (2013). "El archivo del diario "Pueblo". Un referente para la historia de la prensa en España durante el franquismo y la transición democrática". Documentación de las Ciencias de la Información. 36 (36). Universidad Complutense de Madrid: 11–29. doi:10.5209/rev_DCIN.2013.v36.41597. ISSN 0210-4210.
