= Jornada (newspaper) =

Defunct Spanish newspaper

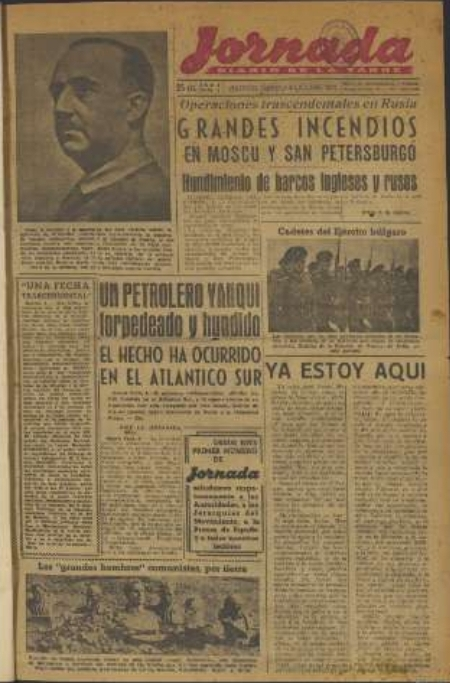
- Newspaper cover from October 4th, 1941.
- Type: Daily Newspaper
- Owner: Cadena de Prensa del Movimiento
- Founded: October 4th, 1941
- Ceased publication: September 30th, 1975
- Political alignment: Francoism
- Language: Spanish
- City: Valencia
- Country: Spain
- ISSN: 2486-9503
- OCLC number: 1142902971

Jornada was a Spanish newspaper published in the city of Valencia between 1941 and 1975.

== History ==
Founded in 1941, it belonged to the Cadena de Prensa del Movimiento. In the Valencia, it coexisted with the newspaper Levante, which was published in the morning, while Jornada —an afternoon paper—was published in the evening. From its origins, it was a loss-making newspaper, and always had modest sales. By 1975, it had accumulated a deficit of more than thirteen million pesetas, a situation that eventually led to its closure. Its last issue was published on September 30, 1975. Its demise also coincided with the closure of the Malaga afternoon newspaper La Tarde.

== Directors ==
Among its directors, José María Bugella and José Barberá Armelles stood out.

== Bibliography ==
- Bordería Ortiz, Enric (2000). The press during the Franco regime: Repression, censorship and business. Valencia, 1939-1975. Madrid: CEU.
- De las Heras Pedrosa, Carlos (2000). The press of the movement and its advertising management, 1936-1984. University of Malaga. ISBN 84-7496-771-6.
- Cabañas Bravo, Miguel (1996). The artistic policy of Francoism: the milestone of the Hispano-American Art Biennial. Madrid: Spanish National Research Council. ISBN 84-00-07586-2.
- Garrido Mayol, Vicente (1998). The political transition in the Valencian Community. Professor Manuel Broseta Foundation.
- Sánchez Rada, Juan (1996). Press, from the movement to socialism: 60 years of computer dirigisme. Fragua. ISBN 8470740814.
- Rius Sanchis, Inmaculada (2000). The journalist, between organization and repression, 1899-1940: towards a history of the Valencian Press Association. San Pablo CEU University Foundation. ISBN 8495219212.
