= Arriba España (newspaper) =

Defunct Spanish newspaper

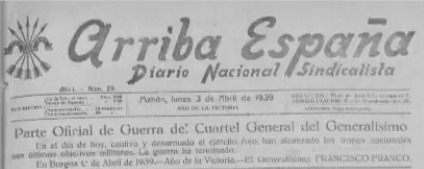
- Type: Daily newspaper
- Owner: Cadena de Prensa del Movimiento
- Founder: Fermín Yzurdiaga
- Founded: 1 August 1936
- Ceased publication: 1 July 1975
- Political alignment: Falangism, Francoism, Spanish nationalism
- Language: Spanish
- Headquarters: Pamplona, Spain

Arriba España was a Spanish newspaper published in Pamplona during the Spanish Civil War and in Francoist Spain, within the Prensa del Movimiento. The name of the publication came from the cry ¡Arriba España!, a motto that was associated with the Falangist ideology. In its early days, it coined the motto Por Dios y el César.

== History ==
The newspaper was born in the summer of 1936, shortly after the outbreak of the Spanish Civil War. The newspaper La Voz de Navarra (organ of expression of the Basque Nationalist Party in the region) had been seized by the Falange Española de las JONS on 20 July. In these facilities, the Falange would publish a new newspaper, Arriba España. Its first issue was released on 1 August 1936. Originally edited under the subtitle Hoja de Combate de F.E. de las J.O.N.S, it would be configured as the organ of expression of Falange in Navarra. With time, it would end up becoming one of the main Falange publications of the rebel zone. The direction of the new newspaper fell to the Pamplonan clergyman Fermín Yzurdiaga, as well as to the Pamplonan journalist and writer Ángel María Pascual.

Arriba España was the first daily newspaper that the Falange counted in. It was a pioneer as a disseminating publication of the Falangist ideology in the rebel zone after the beginning of the war. In its editorial line, anti-Marxist, but also anti-Semitic and anti-Masonic approaches were manifested.

In its first copy, the ideology of the same was clear:

¡Camarada! Tienes obligación de perseguir al judaísmo, a la masonería, al marxismo y al separatismo. Destruye y quema sus periódicos, sus libros, sus revistas, sus propagandas. ¡Camarada! ¡Por Dios y por la Patria!

In November 1936, after the proliferation of the bonfires, from the pages of the publication had to ask for restraint and to respect private libraries. However, as the struggle progressed, the newspaper maintained the dialectic of the first days. On 25 May 1937, it declared:

No vamos a crear campos de concentración para vagos y maleantes políticos. Para masones y judíos. Para los enemigos de la Patria, el Pan y la Justicia. Vamos a levantar cabeza y ser mejores que ellos.

Yzurdiaga and Pascual would be the architects of the newspaper, although throughout the battle, a large number of writers and poets from the rebellious side would collaborate in Arriba España, as was the case of Pedro Laín Entralgo, Dionisio Ridruejo or Eugenio d'Ors, among others. Many of those who collaborated with the newspaper also did so with the magazine Jerarquía (the "Black Magazine of the Falange"), which, like the newspaper, was also directed by Fermín Yzurdiaga. After the Civil War, the newspaper Arriba España continued as a disseminator of the slogans of Falangism. In Francoist Spain, it became part of the Cadena de Prensa del Movimiento.

However, over the years the newspaper was losing readership and slowly entered a strong decline from its previous era. By 1974, the newspaper accumulated losses of over twelve million pesetas (over €72,000). A year later, in 1975, the bad economic situation of the newspaper led Emilio Romero (at that time the National Press Delegate of the Movimiento) to make the decision to close the Arriba España. On 1 July 1975, the last issue was published.
