= Hierro (newspaper) =

Defunct Spanish Newspaper

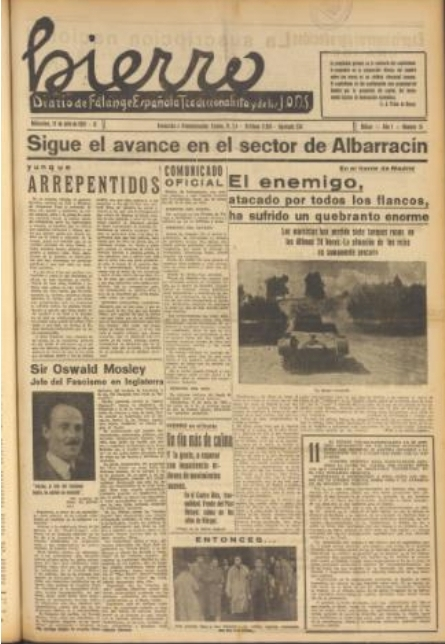
- Hierro newspaper from July 5th, 1937
- Type: Daily Newspaper
- Owner: Cadena de Prensa del Movimiento
- Editor-in-chief: José Vicente Puente
- Editor: José Antonio Giménez-Arnau
- Founded: July 5th, 1937
- Ceased publication: February 14, 1983
- Political alignment: Francoism; Falangism
- Language: Spanish
- City: Bilbao
- Country: Spain
- ISSN: 2487-5813
- OCLC number: 1142897141

Hierro was a Spanish evening newspaper published in the city of Bilbao between 1937 and 1983. Belonging to the Press Chain of the Cadena de Prensa del Movimiento, it constituted the official organ of FET y de las JONS in Biscay.

== History ==
The newspaper Hierro was founded shortly after the city of Bilbao had been occupied by the Nationalists. The first issue was published on July 5, 1937. The Falangist writer José Antonio Giménez-Arnau (Note: Giménez-Arnau had already been the founder and director of the newspaper Unidad in San Sebastián.) was appointed as its editor —and would be its first director—while José Vicente Puente was editor-in-chief.

In its early days, it coexisted with another newspaper of the single party, El Correo Español, which was launched on July 6 as the provincial organ of FET y de las JONS. However, this coexistence did not last long, as in April 1938 this newspaper merged with El Pueblo Vasco to form El Correo Español-El Pueblo Vasco. After this, Hierro remained the only Falangist newspaper in Bilbao. It would eventually consolidate its position as the FET y de las JONS organ in Biscay.

Initially, Hierro used the facilities and machinery of the former newspaper Euzkadi, the official organ of the Basque Nationalist Party (PNV), which had been seized by the Nationalists. Later, its headquarters moved to the former offices of the newspaper El Liberal, owned by the socialist leader Indalecio Prieto. During the Francoist dictatorship, the newspaper became part of the Cadena de Prensa del Movimiento, coexisting in Bilbao with other newspapers such as La Gaceta del Norte and El Correo Español-El Pueblo Vasco. Hierro did not traditionally enjoy wide circulation among the population—at its peak in 1945, it barely exceeded 20,000 copies.

Under the direction of Julio Campuzano, an attempt was made to implement some modernization, but it was unsuccessful. After Franco's death, the newspaper Hierro entered a period of sharp decline. Integrated into the state- owned media organization Medios Social del Estado (MCSE), the government decided to close the newspaper due to continuous financial losses and its small readership. On February 14, 1983, the newspaper published its last issue and was shut down.

== Directors ==
Among others, the newspaper's directors included José Antonio Giménez-Arnau, José Molina Plata, José Luis Banús, Julio Campuzano and Laureano Muñoz Viñarás.

== Bibliography ==
- Díaz Morlán, Pablo (2002). The Ybarras. A dynasty of businessmen (1801-2001). Madrid: Marcial Pons. ISBN 8495379430.
- Garitaonaindía Garnacho, Carmelo (1990). Communication, culture and politics during the Second Republic and the Civil War: Basque Country (1931-1939). University of the Basque Country. ISBN 8475852696.
- Olmos, Víctor (1996). History of the EFE Agency: The World in Spanish. Espasa-Calpe.
- Ossa Echaburu, Rafael (1999). José Molina Plata, journalist (PDF). Pérgola Bilbao City Council.
