= Imperio =

Imperio may refer to:

- Imperio (spell), a curse in the Harry Potter series
- Imperio (band), Austrian band
- Imperio (newspaper)

== See also ==
- Império, a Portuguese-language 2014 Brazilian telenovela
