= SEPU =

Sociedad Española de Precios Únicos, S.A.
- Company type: Sociedad Anónima
- Industry: Retail
- Founded: Barcelona, Spain (January 11, 1934)
- Founder: Henry Reisembach; Edouard Worms
- Defunct: 2002
- Area served: Zaragoza, Barcelona, Madrid

Sociedad Española de Precios Únicos, S.A. (SEPU) was Spain's first department store. SEPU was founded in Barcelona 9 January 1934, by Swiss citizens of Jewish origins, Henry Reisembach and Edouard Worms; it later opened branches in Madrid and Zaragoza. Their slogan was "Quien calcula compra en SEPU" ("Who calculates buys at SEPU").

During the Second Spanish Republic, SEPU was attacked by the Falangist newspaper Arriba, and its premises were physically attacked by Falangists and their sympathizers.

SEPU was purchased in 2000 by Australian retailer Rodd Partridge; it was a failing company at the time. The company closed in 2002 because of previous management's massive undisclosed accumulated tax debts. These could not be negotiated, and the company was forced to close.

The popular SEPU stores were full of customers for the closing-down sale, police had to erect barricades to control the crowds.
