= Proa (newspaper) =

Defunct Spanish newspaper

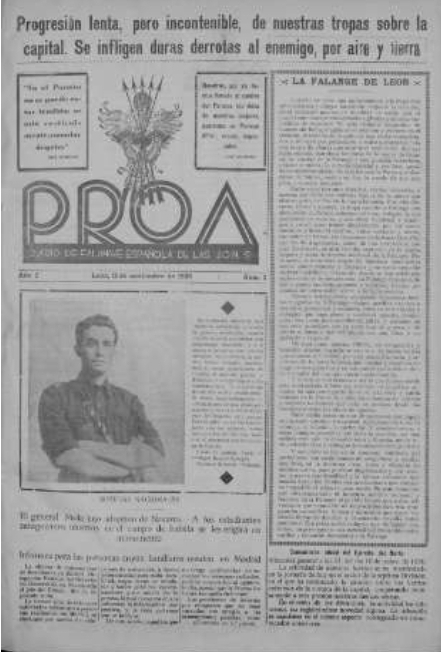
- Newspaper from 10 November 1936, the day it was founded.
- Type: Daily Newspaper
- Owner: Cadena de Prensa del Movimiento
- Founded: 10 November 1936
- Ceased publication: 16 May 1984
- Political alignment: Francoism; Falangism
- Language: Spanish
- City: León
- Country: Spain
- ISSN: 2444-0574
- OCLC number: 1142942245

The Proa newspaper (later renamed La Hora Leonesa) was a Spanish newspaper published in León between 1936 and 1984.

== History ==
The first issue was published on 10 November 1936, following the outbreak of the Spanish Civil War. It was printed at the facilities of the now-defunct newspaper La Democracia, which had been seized by the Nationalists. After the Nationalist victory in the Spanish Civil War Proa became owned by the Cadena de Prensa del Movimiento In 1975 the newspaper changed its name to La Hora Leonesa. After Franco's death, it was integrated into the state-owned media organization Medios Social del Estado (State Social Communication Media). In 1984, the state held a public auction of the newspaper. The company that owned Diario de León participated in the auction and acquired La Hora Leonesa, but immediately decided to close it down on 16 May 1984.

== Directors ==
Its pages featured contributions from authors such as Francisco Umbral, Domingo del Prado, Francisco González or Luis Pastrana.

== Bibliography ==
- Caballé, Anna (2004). Francisco Umbral. The Coldness of a Life. Espasa-Calpe.
- Carro Celada, José Antonio (1984). History of the press in León. Provincial Council of León.
- Celma Valero, María Pilar (2003). Francisco Umbral. Junta de Castilla y León.
- De las Heras Pedrosa, Carlos (2000). The press of the movement and its advertising management, 1936-1984. University of Malaga.
- Elena González, Esteban (2012). Communication and power in the construction of the autonomous state: The information policy of the Junta de Castilla y León and the attempts to create a regional consciousness (1983-1986). Historia Actual Online.
- Moliner Prada, Antonio (1990–1991). Press and propaganda during the Civil War: the newspaper Proa of León (PDF). Tierras de León: Revista de la Diputación Provincial. Archived from the original on 15 July 2013.
