= FE (newspaper) =

Defunct Spanish Newspaper

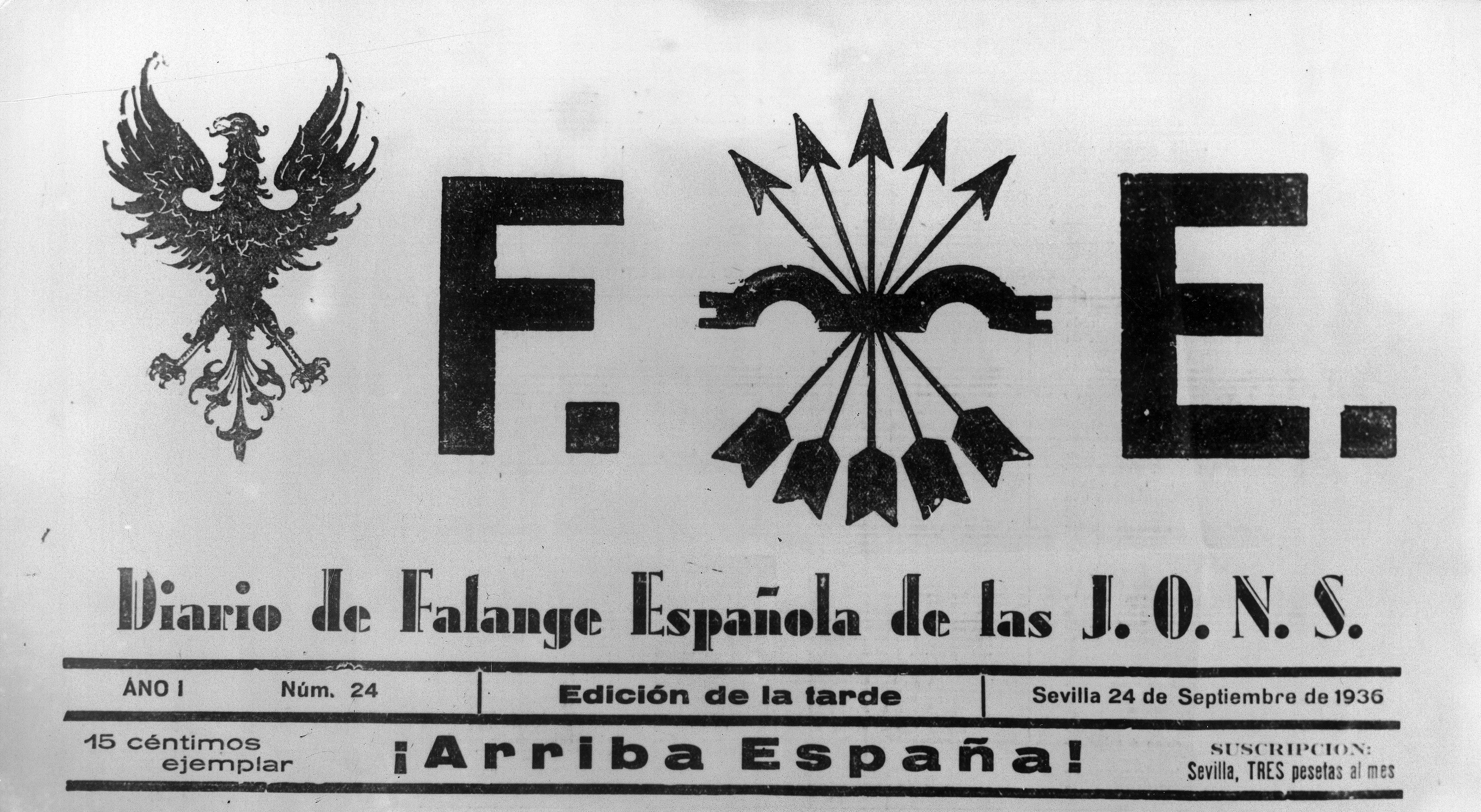
- FE newspaper from the 24th of September, 1936.
- Type: Daily Newspaper
- Owner: Cadena de Prensa del Movimiento
- Founded: September 1, 1936
- Ceased publication: June 16, 1946
- Political alignment: Francoism; Falangism
- Language: Spanish
- City: Seville
- Country: Spain
- ISSN: 2487-7670
- OCLC number: 1335603740

FE (FAITH) was a Spanish newspaper published in the city of Seville between 1936 and 1946.

== History ==
FE was owned by FE de las JONS, and was founded shortly after the outbreak of the Spanish Civil War. It began publication on September 1, 1936, in the former workshops of El Liberal, which had been confiscated.

It would become part of the Cadena de Prensa del Movimiento. During the internal struggles of the FE de las JONS, the FE sided with Sancho Dávila against the provisional leader of the Falange, Manuel Hedilla. Subsequently, the newspaper's lack of success among the Seville public soon became apparent. At times, its circulation was well below 500 copies daily, far from being able to compete with the dominant Seville newspapers such as ABC or El Correo de Andalucía. It continued to be published until June 16, 1946, when it published its last issue and ceased publication. The newspaper Sevilla, the Prensa del Movimiento's official publication which had been running since March 1942, took its place as its organ.

== Directors ==
FE had several directors throughout its history: Patricio González de Canales, Manuel Díez Crespo, Tomás Borrás, Manuel Halcón, José María del Rey Caballero, Francisco Ortiz Muñoz, Enrique Sotomayor, Carlos de la Válgoma, Francisco Narbona González, José Cirre Jiménez, José Molina Plata and Manuel Benítez Salvatierra.

== Bibliography ==
- Checa Godoy, Antonio (1991). History of the Andalusian press. Blas Infante Foundation.
- Checa Godoy, Antonio (2007). ABC de Sevilla, a newspaper and a city. University of Seville.
- Comellas, José Luis (1991). Studies of modern and contemporary history: homage to Federico Suárez Verdeguer. Madrid: Rialp.
- De las Heras Pedrosa, Carlos (2000). The press of the movement and its advertising management, 1936-1984. University of Malaga. ISBN 84-7496-771-6.
- Payne, Stanley G. (1987). The Franco Regime, 1936–1975. Madison: The University of Wisconsin Press. ISBN 0-299-11070-2.
- Reig García, Ramón (2011). Communication in Andalusia: History, structure and new technologies. Seville: Andalusian Studies Center. ISBN 978-84-939078-0-8.
- Rodríguez Puértolas, Julio (2008). History of Spanish Fascist Literature. I. Akal.
- Salas, Nicolás (1991). Seville: chronicles of the 20th century. University of Seville.
- Sánchez Rada, Juan (1996). Press, from the movement to socialism: 60 years of computer dirigisme. Fragua.
- Thomas, Hugh (1976). History of the Spanish Civil War. Barcelona: Círculo de Lectores. ISBN 84-226-0874-X.
