= National Delegation of Press and Propaganda =

Spanish Propaganda Delegation

- Delegación Nacional de Prensa y Propaganda
- Abbreviation: DNPP
- Formation: May 1937; 89 years ago
- Dissolved: April 1977; 49 years ago
- Type: Governmental
- Location: Spain
- Parent organization: FET y de las JONS

The Delegación Nacional de Prensa y Propaganda (DNPP) which translates to the National Delegation of Press and Propaganda (Note: Subsequently, the organization was renamed the National Delegation of Press, Propaganda, and Radio, and then the National Delegation of Press and Radio.) was an organization of the FET y de las JONS, and later of the administration of the Francoist Spain itself, which was in charge of controlling all media, especially those in the hands of FET y de las JONS, as well as Francoist propaganda.

== History ==
The Delegación Nacional de Prensa y Propaganda was created as an organ of FET y de las JONS in May 1937, after the Unification Decree had been enacted. Its first head was the Falangist priest Fermín Yzurdiaga. Initially, it managed some of the newspapers and publications that until then had been under the control of FET y de las JONS, although it was still under strong military censorship.

With the formation of Franco's first government (January 1938), the National Delegation of Press and Propaganda also became part of the state administration and was placed under the Ministry of the Interior, headed by Ramón Serrano Suñer. (Note: According to some authors, Serrano Suñer held the positions of Minister of the Interior and National Delegate for Press and Propaganda simultaneously.) This entailed the unification of the Delegación del Estado para Prensa y Propaganda (State Delegation for Press and Propaganda)—an organization created in January 1937— with the Delegation attached to the Falange into a single entity. From that moment on, the delegation had an efficient organization: it came to have a General Directorate of Propaganda, headed by Dionisio Ridruejo, and a General Directorate of Press, headed by José Antonio Giménez-Arnau.

Following the outbreak of the Spanish Civil War, the Nationalists had seized control of numerous newspapers, publishing houses, and printing presses belonging to the Republicans. All these publications—as well as printing presses, rotary presses, and radio stations—came under the control of the National Delegation of Press and Propaganda in 1938. By a law in July 1940, all these media outlets were transferred as property to the agency; the State had access to some forty newspapers that would form what was known as the "Cadena de Prensa del Movimiento."

Between 1941 and 1945, many of its functions were assumed by the Vice-Secretariat of Popular Education of the FET y de las JONS, although the National Delegation of Press and Propaganda subsequently recovered some powers. (Note: According to some authors, in 1951 the DNPP came under the jurisdiction of the newly created Ministry of Information and Tourism.) In February 1948, the FET y de las JONS radio services were created and placed under the agency's control. In 1956, Minister Gabriel Arias Salgado, known for his Catholic fundamentalism and pro-Nazi leanings, reorganized the services of the National Delegation: the position of provincial National Delegation of Press and Propaganda was reinstated, and the media outlets under its ownership—press, propaganda, and radio broadcasting—returned to its strict control, remaining under the direction of the DNPP.

In April 1977, the organization was dissolved, as was its parent organization, FET y de las JONS.

== Dependents ==
Throughout its existence, the organization's functions and the bodies under its control varied. From 1938, it controlled the media outlets seized since the beginning of the war, and from 1940, by state law, it owned what would eventually become known as the Cadena de Prensa del Movimiento. The Official School of Journalism, where numerous journalists were trained, was attached to the National Delegation of Press and Propaganda. Also under its jurisdiction were a publishing house—Ediciones del Movimiento—, the Pyresa news agency (Spanish Press and Radio), as well as several magazines and weekly publications.

The newspaper Pueblo —the newspaper of the Vertical Syndicate —initially depended on the Delegation, but later passed to the National Delegation of Trade Unions.

The National Delegation of Press and Propaganda was responsible not only for print publications but also for radio stations. This was the case with the Movement's Radio Network (REM). In 1974, the Blue Broadcasting Network (CAR) also became part of the National Delegation.

== Bibliography ==
- Berthier, Nancy; Seguin, Jean-Claude (2007). Cinema, nation and nationalities in Spain. Madrid: Casa de Velázquez.
- De Haro, Verónica (2013). Communication through history. Visión Libros.
- De la Hera Martínez, Jesús (2002). Germany's cultural policy in Spain during the interwar period. Madrid: CSIC.
- Fernández García, Tomás; García Rico, Agustín (2001). Media, society and education. Cuenca: University of Castilla-La Mancha.
- Gil, Fátima; Mateos-Pérez, Javier (2012). What things we saw with Franco... Cinema, press and television from 1939 to 1975. Madrid: Ediciones Rialp.
- Gómez-Reino, Enrique (1976). Press, Information and Advertising Legislation. Civitas.
- Fusi, Juan Pablo. Spain in the 20th Century. Marcial Pons History.
- Martín Mateo, Ramón (1974). Organization of the public sector in Spain. Civitas.
- Meseguer, Manuel Nicolás (2004). The veiled intervention: German cinematic support for the Francoist side (1936-1939). University of Murcia.
- Morales Ruiz, Juan José (2001). The anti-Masonic discourse in the Spanish Civil War (1936-1939). General Council of Aragon.
- Palacios, Bañuelos (2001). To approach a history of Francoism. Academic Editions.
- Pizarroso Quintero, Alejandro (2009). Diplomats, propagandists and spies. Madrid: CSIC.
- Reig García, Ramón (2011). Communication in Andalusia: History, structure and new technologies. Seville: Andalusian Studies Center. ISBN 978-84-939078-0-8.
- Rodríguez Jiménez, José Luis (1994). Reactionaries and coup plotters. Madrid: CSIC. ISBN 84-00-07442-4.
- Sevillano Calero, Francisco (1998). Propaganda and media in the Franco regime (1936-1951). University of Alicante.
- Sinova, Justino (2006). Press censorship during the Franco regime. Barcelona: DeBolsillo. ISBN 84-8346-134-X.
- Timoteo Álvarez, Jesús (1989). History of the media in Spain: journalism, image and advertising, 1900-1990. Ariel.
