= Cadena de Prensa del Movimiento =

Former Spanish Media Group

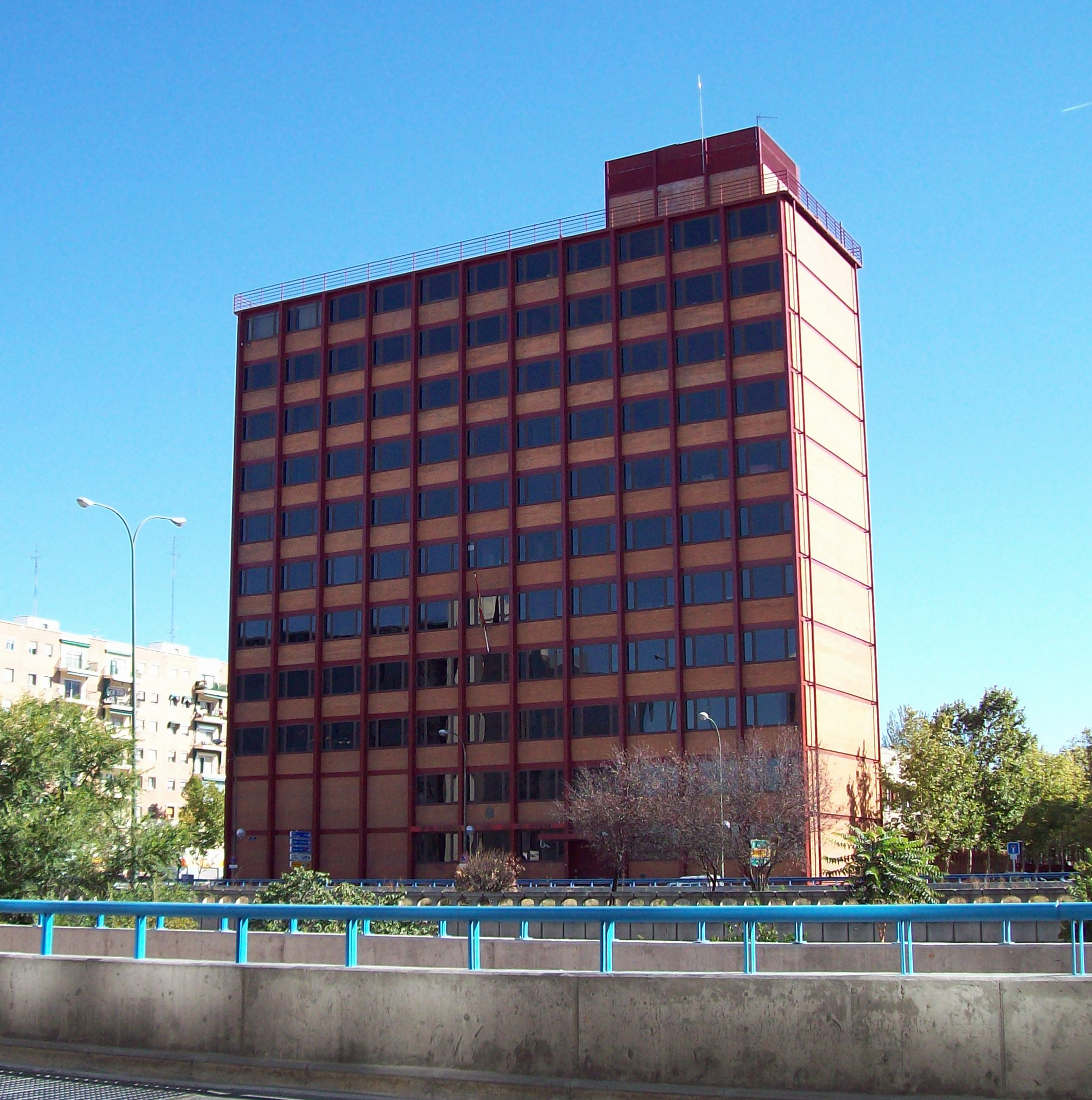
Headquarters of the newspaper Arriba in Madrid, which was the most symbolic media outlet of the Cadena de Prensa del Movimiento.

The Cadena de Prensa del Movimiento (Press Chain of the Movement) was a Spanish media group that existed in Francoist Spain and belonged to the state's single party, the Falange Española Tradicionalista y de las JONS (FET y de las JONS). The group was formed after a state law of July 13, 1940, which granted single party ownership of all publications, printing presses, and rotary presses that had been seized by the Nationalists from Republican parties and organizations during the Spanish Civil War and the immediate postwar period. All these assets became part of the patrimony of the Delegación Nacional de Prensa y Propaganda (National Delegation of Press and Propaganda) of FET y de las JONS, which came to control more than forty newspapers. The Cadena de Prensa del Movimiento constituted an important propaganda element for the Franco regime and was one of the most important business groups in the Francoist State.

Following Franco's death and the democratization of Spain, the group was renamed to the Medios de Comunicación Social del Estado (MCSE). This organization survived for some years until it was dissolved by law. The dismantling of the former Cadena de Prensa del Movimiento continued until 1984, with its final liquidation.

== History ==
=== Birth and consolidation ===
Following the outbreak of the Spanish Civil War, the Nationalist forces seized control of numerous newspapers, publishing houses, and printing presses belonging to the Republicans and their allies. All these publications—as well as printing presses, rotary presses, and radio stations—came under the control of the National Delegation of Press and Propaganda. All newspapers were subjected to censorship established in the 1938 Press Law. The Francoist authorities banned all liberal, republican, and leftist newspapers, and their assets were eventually confiscated by the State. Finally, the law of July 13, 1940, granted full ownership of the confiscated media outlets to the National Delegation of Press and Propaganda of the FET y de las JONS.

This marked the birth of what would become known as the "Cadena de Prensa del Movimiento." At its inception, it comprised some 40 newspapers, among which Arriba —the official organ of FET y de las JONS—and Pueblo—the newspaper of the Spanish Syndical Organization—stood out. (Note: The newspaper Pueblo initially depended on the National Delegation of Press and Propaganda, but later passed to the National Delegation of Trade Unions.) However, the publication with the largest circulation and the widest readership was the sports daily Marca, which began daily publication in 1942. The newspaper Arriba became the doctrinal organ of the Franco regime, even influencing the editorial line of many provincial newspapers. Of all the newspapers in the Prensa del Movimiento, the Pamplona-based newspaper Arriba España was the first to have begun publication—on August 1, 1936. At the provincial and/or local level, there were cases in which the Prensa del Movimiento almost enjoyed a journalistic monopoly. With this privileged position the independent press was greatly reinforced when a ministerial order of May 1, 1941, exempted the Movement's press from having to undergo prior censorship by the authorities.

On January 28, 1947, Sociedad Editora Universal—former owner of the newspapers Heraldo de Madrid, El Liberal, and El Defensor of Granada—submitted a notarized demand to FET y de las JONS requiring the return of its assets, but the request came to nothing.

The newspapers in the Prensa del Movimiento shared some of their material among themselves. An example of this was the children's supplement "La Hora del Recreo" (Recess Time) of the newspaper Levante, whose sales success led to its acquisition by 14 other newspapers in the group. The press network had its own publishing house—Ediciones del Movimiento (Movement Editions)—and also a news agency, Pyresa (Prensa y Radio Española - Spanish Press and Radio).

In the mid-1950s, the influence of the Prensa del Movimiento was enormous: in 1956, of the 104 newspapers published in metropolitan Spain and the colonies, 38 belonged to the Movement, meaning that 32% of the Spanish press was in the hands of the single party. However, as time passed, the influence of the party's press diminished: while in 1945, 41% of the Spanish press was controlled by the FET y de las JONS, by 1970 it controlled only 26%.

Throughout its history, the newspaper group experienced financial difficulties, primarily due to a lack of profitability. Political rather than economic criteria were often prioritized in the management and administration of these publications. Its final years resulted in a significant drain on public funds. From 1966 to 1970, profits fell from 44,547,529 pesetas to 5,443,134. From that point onward, the figure continued to decline, and the group entered into heavy losses, reaching -74,309,865 pesetas in 1975. By 1975, the poor financial situation of the state-owned press chain demonstrated the project's unsustainability. Emilio Romero Gómez, the new National Delegate for Press and Radio in 1975, faced with this situation, proposed closing the most unprofitable newspapers—among others, Amanecer in Zaragoza, Diario de Cuenca, La Voz de Castilla in Burgos, Pueblo Gallego in Vigo, La Prensa, and Libertad in Valladolid. However, the measure was only partially implemented: Arriba España closed in the summer of 1975, and by mid-1976 Jornada, La Voz de Castilla, Sevilla, La Tarde, and Voluntad had also closed.

=== Recent Years ===
Following Franco's death and facing an uncertain future, the group underwent several changes during the late Francoist period. In April 1977, both FET y de las JONS and the National Delegation of Press and Propaganda were dissolved by the government of Adolfo Suárez. Following this, Decree Law 708/1977 of April 15, 1977, established the change of name and structure of the media group, transforming it into an autonomous state body called "State Social Communication Media." This body, which was organically dependent on the Ministry of Culture, continued to exist until its dissolution in 1984. At the time of its establishment, the body comprised 35 newspapers, the Pyresa news agency, 43 radio stations (Note: These stations, belonging to the Network of Stations of the Movement (REM), the Blue Broadcasting Network (CAR) and the Union Station Network (CES), were reorganized after the dissolution of FET y las JONS, and in 1978 they joined together to form Radiocadena Española (RCE).), and a radio production company. The newspaper Pueblo was later added to the organization, although as a separate unit. During these years, the State proceeded in some cases to close numerous loss-making newspapers, while in others it privatized some titles through public auction. In practice, this meant the dismantling and suppression of the old Prensa del Movimiento, constituting a momentous event for the Spanish journalistic field.

== Publications ==
=== Newspaper Network ===
Media	Headquarters	Creation or Acquisition	Disappearance	Notes
Alerta	Santander	September 1, 1937	—	Sold at public auction (1984).
Amanecer	Zaragoza	March 11, 1936	June 17, 1979	
Arriba	Madrid	March 29, 1939	June 16, 1979	
Arriba España	Pamplona (Navarra)	August 1, 1936	July 1, 1975	
Baleares	Palma de Mallorca (Baleares)	June 13, 1939	—	Sold at public auction (1983).
Córdoba (Note: Its predecessor was Azul, published in Córdoba between October 1936 and July 1941.)	Córdoba	July 25, 1941	—	Sold at public auction (1984).
Diario de Cuenca	Cuenca	June 4, 1942	April 29, 1984	
Diario Español	Tarragona	January 17, 1939	May 15, 1984	Transformed into Diari de Tarragona
Ébano	Santa Isabel de Fernando Poo (Spanish Guinea)	November, 1939	—	Equatorial Guinea became independent on October 12, 1968.
El Eco de Canarias	Las Palmas de Gran Canaria	June 23, 1963	February 13, 1983	Part of its machinery transferred to Ébano
El Correo de Zamora	Zamora	June 11, 1963	—	Sold at public auction (1984).
El Pueblo Gallego	Vigo (Pontevedra)	January 10, 1937	June 17, 1979	
Falange	Las Palmas de Gran Canaria	December 7, 1936	June 22, 1963	Transformed into El Eco de Canarias
F.E.	Sevilla	September 1, 1936	June 16, 1946	
La Gaceta Regional	Salamanca	c. 1956	—	Sold at public auction (1984).
Hierro	Bilbao (Biscay)	July 5, 1937	February 14, 1983	
Imperio	Zamora	October 29, 1936	June 9, 1963	Merged with El Correo de Zamora
Información	Alicante	July 18, 1941	—	Sold at public auction (1984).
Jaén	Jaén	April 1, 1941	—	Sold at public auction (1984).
Jornada	Valencia	October 4, 1941	September 30, 1975	
La Mañana	Lleida	December 20, 1938	July 27, 1984	
La Nueva España	Oviedo	December 19, 1936	—	Sold at public auction (1984).
La Prensa	Barcelona	May 28, 1941	June 16, 1979	
La Tarde	Málaga	1937/1940 (Note: Originally founded in 1937 as Boinas Rojas, it was renamed La Tarde in 1940.)	September 30, 1975	
La Voz de Castilla	Burgos	September 1, 1945	January 24, 1976	
La Voz de España	San Sebastián (Guipúzcoa)	June 2, 1937	February 17, 1980	
La Voz del Sur	Jerez de la Frontera (Cádiz)	November 1, 1963 (Note: Originally founded in 1936 as Ayer, it later passed into the hands of the Falange and became its official organ in the province of Cádiz. La Voz del Sur was a weekly newspaper that appeared in Cádiz in 1949 and was published in Jerez from 1952. In 1963, the daily Ayer closed due to poor financial results, and the weekly La Voz del Sur took its place.)	March 31, 1984	
Levante	Valencia	April 10, 1939	—	Sold at public auction (1983).
Libertad	Valladolid	August 21, 1938	c. 1979	
Línea	Murcia	March 29, 1939	February 12, 1983	
Los Sitios	Gerona	January 1, 1943	—	Sold at public auction (1979).
Lucha	Teruel	1936/1942	c. 1980	
Marca	Madrid	November 25, 1942 (Note: It was founded on the 21st of December, 1938 but it was a weekly publication until November 25, 1942 when it became a daily publication.)	—	Sold at public auction (1984).
Mediterráneo	Castellón de la Plana	June 14, 1938	—	Sold at public auction (1984).
Nueva España	Huesca	November 30, 1936	February 21, 1984	Transformed into Diario del Altoaragón.
Odiel	Huelva	August 1, 1937 (Note: Originally founded in 1935 as the newspaper of the CEDA, during the civil war it came under the control of FET y de las JONS.)	April 29, 1984	
Patria	Granada	1937/1939	February 14, 1983	
Proa (Note: On September 1st, 1975 it was renamed La Hora Leonesa and continued to be published until its demise in 1984.)	León	November 10, 1936	May 16, 1984	
Pueblo	Madrid	June 17, 1940	May 17, 1984	
Sevilla	Seville	March 16, 1942	June 26, 1976 (Note: It was succeeded by the newspaper Suroeste, which aimed to become a major regional daily in Andalusia. However, it failed in this endeavor and disappeared in 1983.)	Transformed into Suroeste
Suroeste	Seville	June 29, 1976	February 13, 1983	
Solidaridad Nacional	Barcelona	February 14, 1939	June 16, 1979	
Sur	Málaga	February 10, 1937	—	Sold at public auction (1984).
Unidad	San Sebastián (Guipúzcoa)	September 16, 1936	February 17, 1980	
Voluntad	Gijón (Oviedo)	November 3, 1937	August 31, 1975	
Yugo (Note: At the beginning of the 1960s it was renamed La Voz de Almería.)	Almería	March 30, 1939	—	Sold at public auction (1984).

=== Other Publications ===
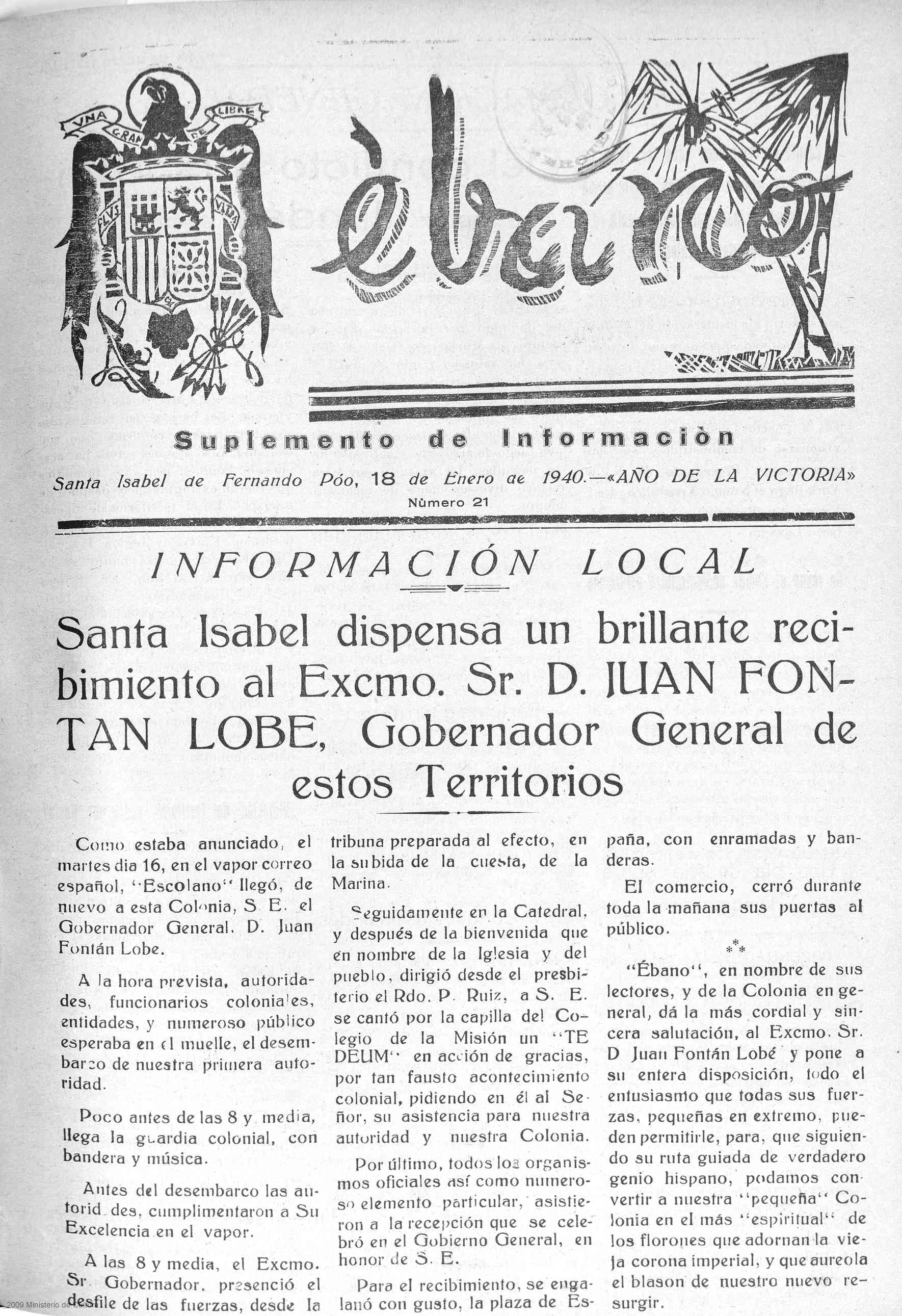
Ébano headline from 1940.

In the Spanish territories of Guinea, the Province of the Sahara and the Protectorate in Morocco, the Prensa del Movimiento also controlled several publications. Among others, notable examples included El Telegrama del Rif in Melilla, La Realidad in El Aaiún, and El Ébano in Santa Isabel de Fernando Póo. After Morocco's independence, El Telegrama del Rif was renamed El Telegrama de Melilla and was one of the few newspapers that did not go to public auction along with the others in the media group during the 1980s.

In other respects, the press chain published a number of magazines, among which the following stood out: 7 Fechas, Fotos, Vértice, Haz, Escorial, Maravillas, El Ruedo, Primer Plano, Sucedió, Flechas y Pelayos, etc. It also published five weekly news bulletins/newspapers and other publications such as Fénix, Así es, El Boletín de Prensa Extranjera, and the renowned weekly El Español. These latter publications were distributed by the Prensa del Movimiento's Publications Section.

== See also ==
History of Spanish journalism

== Bibliography ==
- Carro Celada, José Antonio (1984). History of the press in León. Provincial Council of León.
- De Haro, Verónica (2013). Communication through history. Visión Libros.
- De las Heras Pedrosa, Carlos (2000). The press of the movement and its advertising management, 1936-1984. University of Malaga.
- De la Viuda, Luis (2010). Burgos de Memoria. Promecal.
- Fusi, Juan Pablo (2000). "Culture". In José Luis García Delgado (coord.), ed. Francoism. The judgment of history. Madrid: Temas de Hoy. ISBN 84-8460-070-X.
- Gallego, Ferrán; Morente, Francisco (2005). Fascism in Spain: Essays on the Social and Cultural Origins of Francoism. El Viejo Topo. ISBN 84-96356-32-9.
- Gil, Fátima; Mateos-Pérez, Javier (2012). What things we saw with Franco... Cinema, press and television from 1939 to 1975. Madrid: Ediciones Rialp.
- Herrero Suárez, Henar (2007). A Yoke for the Arrows. Milenio.
- López, Rafael; Fernández, Francisco; Durán, Ángeles (2002). The local press and the free press. Jaume University. ISBN 84-8021-399-X.
- Martín de la Guardia, Ricardo M. (1994). Information and Propaganda in the Press of the Movement. Freedom of Valladolid, 1931-1979. University of Valladolid.
- Martínez Pérez, David (2004). The democratic transition in León: 1975-1977. University of León.
- Palacios Bañuelos, Luis; Rodríguez Jiménez, José Luis (2001). To approach a history of Francoism. Academic Editions.
- Payne, Stanley (1999). Fascism in Spain, (1923-1977). University of Wisconsin Press. ISBN 0-299-16564-7.
- Pérez Gómez, Alberto (2002). The control of media concentrations. Madrid: Dykinson.
- Porcel Torrens, Pedro (2002). Classics in Jauja. The history of Valencian comics. Alicante: Edicions de Ponent. ISBN 84-89929-38-6.
- Ramírez de Arellano Oñate, Ana-María (1981). Literary manifestations through the newspaper "Nueva España" from 1936 to 1939 (poetry and prose). Argensola: Journal of Social Sciences of the Institute of Altoaragonese Studies.
- Reig García, Ramón (2011). Communication in Andalusia: History, structure and new technologies. Seville: Andalusian Studies Center. ISBN 978-84-939078-0-8.
- "The press of Andalusia during the Transition", in Ámbitos. Andalusian Journal of Communication. 1998.
- “Censorship and slogans in the Francoist press. Some examples of information control in Ámbitos. Revista Andaluza de Comunicación. 2003.
- “Conquering Freedom. From Francoist Developmentalism to the Statute of Autonomy (1966-1982)”. 2009. ISBN 978-84-92581-04-7.
- Rodríguez Jiménez, José Luis (1994). Reactionaries and coup plotters. ISBN 84-00-07442-4.
- Sánchez Rada, Juan (1996). Press, from the movement to socialism: 60 years of computer dirigisme. Fragua.
- Sevillano Calero, Francisco (1998). Propaganda and media in the Franco regime (1936-1951). University of Alicante.
- Sinova, Justino (2006). Press censorship during the Franco regime. Barcelona: DeBolsillo. ISBN 84-8346-134-X.
- Timoteo Álvarez, Jesús (1989). History of the media in Spain: journalism, image and advertising, 1900-1990. Ariel.
