= Rodd Partridge =

Australian businessman (born 1976)

- Born: 30 December 1976; Sydney, Australia
- Occupation(s): Financier, retailer, entrepreneur

Rodd Partridge (born 30 December 1976) is an Australian born retailer and private investor.

Partridge is regarded as intensely private and somewhat reclusive, his only recent media interview was with Spanish newspaper Cinco Dias after his group's acquisition of the retailing group SEPU. Partridge currently heads Invicta Partners, a private equity firm based in Sydney, and he is understood to hold a number of investments throughout the Pacific and South America. Partridge closed the Spanish retail operations in 2002, facing intensive protests from employees and extensive media coverage.

== Personal ==
Partridge is known to fence, surf and be a strong supporter of the Rugby Union code. One of Partridge's quirks is that although his enterprises often retail alcohol, Partridge himself is, by personal choice, a strict teetotaler. Originally a military and pastoral family, it is understood Partridge's ancestors arrived in Australia from the United Kingdom in 1814.

Partridge holds a Master of Business from the University of Newcastle, Australia.
