= Ébano (newspaper) =

Equatorial Guinean newspaper

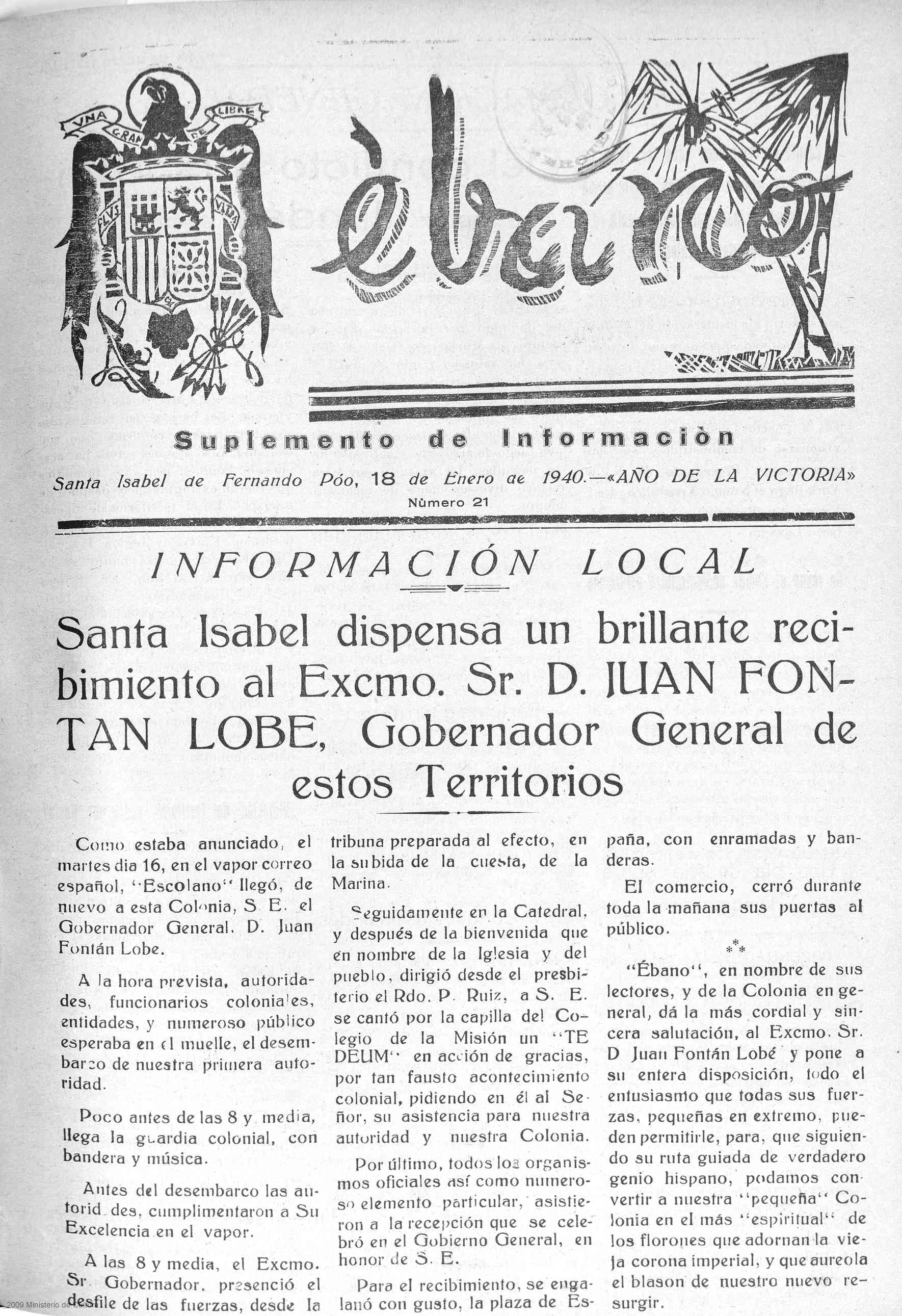
- Ébano newspaper from January 18th, 1940 about Juan Fontán Lobé.
- Editor-in-chief: Celas Josefa Bindang
- Editor: Alberto Elo Nse
- Founded: November, 1939
- Language: Spanish
- ISSN: 9969-0691
- OCLC number: 436573215

Ébano is a newspaper from Equatorial Guinea that began its publication in the Spanish Territories on the Gulf of Guinea.

== History ==
It was founded in 1939, as Ébano, Semanario de la Guinea Española (Ébano, Weekly newspaper of Spanish Guinea). It was published by the FET y de las JONS and it would become part of the Cadena de Prensa del Movimiento while Poto Poto (1951), its counterpart for the mainland area, depended on the Provincial Council of Río Muni.

Initially, it was printed at the press and workshops confiscated in September 1936 from the bi-weekly El Defensor de Guinea, which had been promoted since May 1, 1930, by postal administration officials. After the confiscation, the first editions used the masthead El Nacionalista-Organ of the Nationalist Militias of the Spanish Territories on the Gulf of Guinea, and then in 1937 Frente Nacional-Colonial Weekly of New Spain, which published a daily newsletter, until it adopted the definitive name Ébano in October 1939. For years, its headquarters were in the Jones building, the historic headquarters of the local FET y de las JONS, and which currently houses the National Library of Equatorial Guinea.

Throughout its existence, it has had a variable periodicity, frequently changing its publication period from weekly to daily to monthly. From 1965 to 1968, the edition even included a Monday edition of Fernando Póo, as it was not published on that day of the week, following the practices of the Spanish press.

In February 1946, they also published the weekly sports daily Rotativo Deportivo, distributed both on the islands and the mainland, although after 35 editions it was renamed "La Voz de Guinea Continental," mimeographed in Bata by the Sports Board of that region and no longer linked to Ébano. According to various authors, this sports daily was the origin of Poto Poto.

In 1953 it already appeared subtitled as Diario de la Guinea Española (Diary of Spanish Guinea) and a decade later as Diario de la Región Ecuatorial (Diary of the Equatorial Region).

In 1964, it had a print run of 1,000 copies and its distribution extended beyond the island, reaching as far as Rio Muni, Nigeria , and Cameroon. It boasted an Intertype C linotype machine, a Jullien flatbed press, and an Elgrama electronic photogravure system, as well as auxiliary equipment, unlike Poto Poto, which was printed in the workshops of the La Salle Labor Center in Bata and typeset by hand on flatbed presses.

In 1968, in Santa Isabel de Fernando Poo, the newspaper Ébano was sold for two pesetas. With an almost tabloid format and eight pages, it published the programs of the cinemas, along with those of Radio Santa Isabel and the Television of Equatorial Guinea, with the schedule of masses, the Saints' Calendar, the Pharmacy on Duty and other announcements from the City Hall or the Official Agricultural Chamber on the second page, as well as those overdue in returning books to the Public Library and the fines of two pesetas per day of delay.

=== After Independence ===
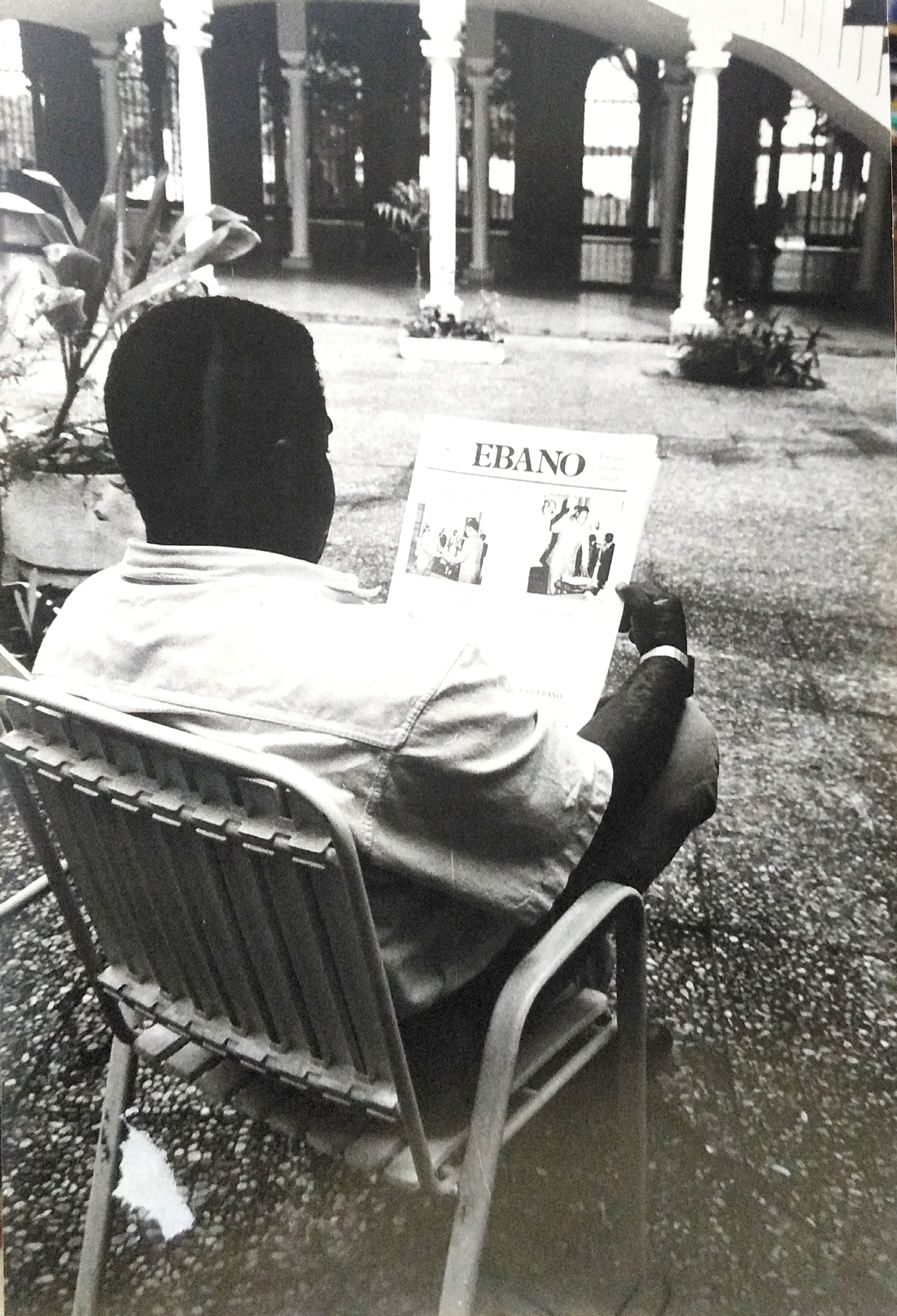
Equatorial Guinean reading an Ébano newspaper.

Following Equatorial Guinea's independence, ownership and management passed to the new authorities, retaining the name Ébano. From 1973 to 1975, it temporarily adopted the name Unidad de Guinea Ecuatorial, undergoing a period of intermittent publication, the longest being from 1975 to 1980. In August 1980, it began receiving support from the news services of the EFE Agency, it was printed on machinery from El Eco de Canarias, recovering its historic masthead. In the 1990s, the printing press of the Centro Cultural Hispano-Guineano (Hispano-Guinean Cultural Center) temporarily included the printing of the newspaper itself in its publishing program: "Apart from the creation of these two cultural dissemination magazines (Africa 2000 and El Patio), the CCH-G offered its collaboration to the Guinean government to provide the country with a true written means of communication that was not a product of the Cultural Center, but of the government itself." The result of this collaboration was the reappearance of the newspaper Ébano and the creation of the National Publishing House of Equatorial Guinea, for which the CCEH-G bought an ultramodern printing press and trained the necessary personnel to operate it. Finally, in June 1991, the printing press that had been managed until then by the Spanish Cooperation in Equatorial Guinea was transferred to the National Publishing House.

Ébano is currently still state-owned and is regularly published in the city of Malabo.

In November 2022, the digital newspaper AhoraEG reported that both Ébano and Poto Poto would have a digital edition.

In September 2023, the National Library of Spain reported the digitization for preservation purposes of the historical editions of Ébano.

== Directors ==
In its first stage it was initially directed by Heriberto Ramón Álvarez (1939–1940), and for several years by Ángel García-Margallo Barbera (1940–1943), who was succeeded in the position by Sebastián Llompart Aulet (1943–1961) and José Cervera Pery (1961–1968).

In 1968, after independence, Gabriel José Núñez Diácono took over as director, followed by legendary directors such as Severo Moto, Pedro Ignacio González, Laureano Nsue Nguema, Alberto Elo Nse (2015–2022), and Teodora Ngomo, as well as renowned assistant directors such as Anacleto Oló Mibuy and Santiago Benito Mabanja.

Saturnino Ibongo, the first Equatorial Guinean to graduate in journalism and author of the lyrics of the National Anthem, also worked in the editorial department of Ébano.

Iñigo de Aranzadi, journalist and first corresponding academic of the RAE in Río Muni was a film critic for several years in the newspaper.

== Awards ==
- In 1950 Ébano was awarded the "Africa of Literature and Journalism" prize by the presidency of the government.
- In 1964, the special edition for the 25th Anniversary of Peace was selected among the best commemorative editions of the printed press.
- Likewise, José Cervera Pery (1960 and 1962), José Menéndez Hernández (1960) and Gabriel José Núñez Diácono (1962) journalists from the same obtained the "Africa of Literature and Journalism" award for the published articles.
- Similarly, in 2010, the Equatorial Guinea Press Association ASOPGE awarded the prize for the 2nd best columnist in the written press to Laureano Nsue Nguema, at that time deputy director of Ébano.
- Santiago Benito Mabanja, deputy director, was the winner (2014) of the "October 12 Literary Competition" convened by the Spanish Cultural Centers in Bata and Malabo.

== In popular culture ==
The oldest kiosk and stationery shop in the city of Zaragoza is called Ébano in memory of the Equatorial Guinean newspaper.

It is a common resource in literature set in Equatorial Guinea, such as in The Shadow of Egombe (2013) by Gudea de Lagash.

== Bibliography ==
- del Valle, José (2013). A Political History of Spanish: The Making of a Language. Cambridge University Press.
- Faszer-McMahon, Debra (2015–2016). African Immigrants in Contemporary Spanish Texts. Crossing the Strait. Routledge.
- Núñez Seixas, Xosé M. (2014). Imaginaries and representations of Spain during the Franco regime. Madrid: Casa de Velázquez. ISBN 9788415636656.
- Sánchez Rada, Juan (1996). Press, from the movement to socialism: 60 years of computer dirigisme. Fragua.
