= Imperio (newspaper) =

Spanish newspaper

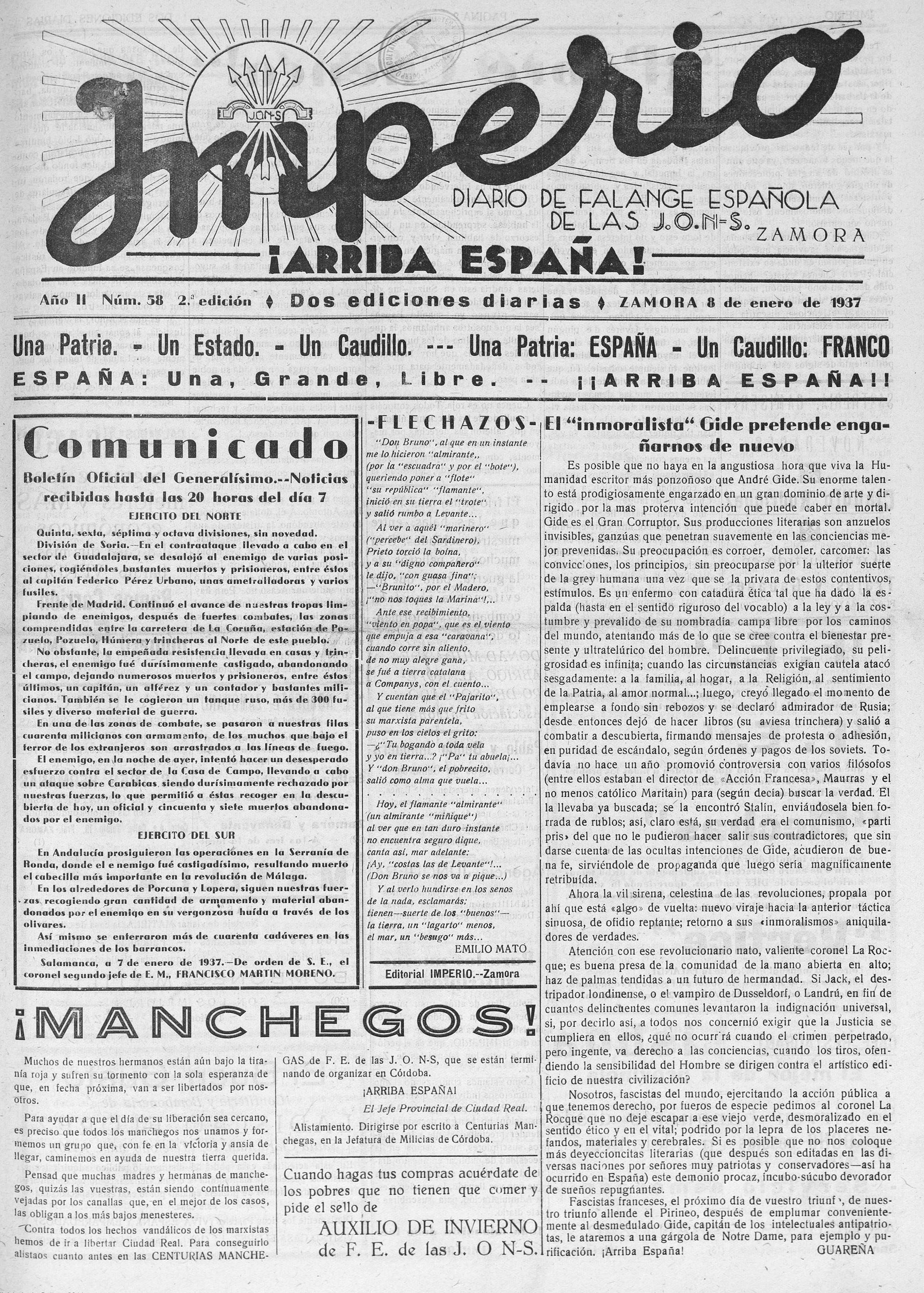
- Type: Daily Newspaper
- Owner: Cadena de Prensa del Movimiento
- Founded: October 29, 1936
- Ceased publication: June 9, 1963
- Political alignment: Falangism; National Catholicism; Francoism; Spanish Nationalism
- Language: Spanish
- City: Zamora, Spain
- Country: Spain
- ISSN: 2444-1368
- OCLC number: 1142924517

Imperio was a Spanish newspaper published in the city of Zamora between 1936 and 1963. Initially belonging to the Falange Española de las JONS party, during the Francoist dictatorship it became part of the press network of the Cadena de Prensa del Movimiento.

== History ==
The newspaper began publication on October 29, 1936, during the Spanish Civil War, under the name Imperio: Diario de Zamora de la Falange Española de las JONS. It was a local publication in the city of Zamora. It was published daily, occasionally with two editions per day. The editions included supplements, generally related to the party's ideology, and covering a variety of other topics.

The last issue of Imperio was published on June 9, 1963; it included a note to readers explaining that on June 11 of that year, the newspaper's editorial division merged with El Correo de Zamora, briefly becoming known as El Correo de Zamora-Imperio. The new publication retained its name until December of that year, when it was shortened to "El Correo de Zamora".

During its existence, the newspaper's editors included Adolfo Duque, Timoteo Esteban Vega, and Laureano Muñoz Viñarás. Authors such as Federico Acosta Noriega and Miguel Gila —who stood out for his early journalistic work— contributed to Imperio.

== Bibliography ==
- Altabella, José (1966). El Norte de Castilla in its journalistic context.
- Aróstegui, Julio (1988). History and memory of the Civil War.
- De las Heras, Carlos (2000). The press of the movement and its advertising management, 1936-1984 (PDF). University of Malaga. ISBN 84-7496-771-6.
- Sevillano Calero, Francisco (1998). Propaganda and media in the Franco regime (1936-1951). University of Alicante.
