= Diario de Aragón =

Diario de Aragón (meaning Aragon Daily in English) was a Spanish language daily newspaper published from Zaragoza, Spain. It was launched around the time of the Popular Front victory in the 1936 general election. The first issue was published on 14 February 1936. Politically, the newspaper was supportive of the Popular Front and, in particular, the Republican Left. The publication was discontinued as the Spanish Civil War broke out in July 1936.
