= Pedro Laín Entralgo =

Spanish physician, historian, author and philosopher

The Most Excellent Pedro Laín
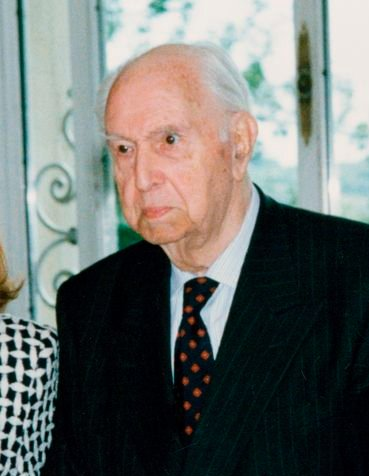
- Laín in 1996
- Born: Pedro Laín Entralgo; 15 February 1908; Urrea de Gaén (Teruel), Spain
- Died: 5 June 2001 (aged 93); Madrid, Spain

Seat j of the Real Academia Española
- In office 30 May 1954 – 5 June 2001
- Preceded by: Jacobo Fitz-James Stuart
- Succeeded by: Álvaro Pombo

Director of the Real Academia Española
- In office 2 December 1982 – December 1987
- Preceded by: Dámaso Alonso
- Succeeded by: Rafael Lapesa

Pedro Laín Entralgo (15 February 1908 – 5 June 2001) was a Spanish physician, historian, author and philosopher. He worked, fundamentally, on medical history and anthropology.

== Biography ==
He was born in Urrea de Gaén (Teruel, Spain) in 1908. He obtained the degrees of Medicine and Chemical Sciences in the Central University of Madrid, and PhD in Medicine with the dissertation: "El problema de las relaciones entre la medicina y la historia" (The problem of the relationships between medicine and history".

During the Spanish Civil War he contributed to Arriba España. In the context of the Spanish Civil postwar period, he became an important member of the intellectual circle of the Falange. In 1942 he obtained the first chair of History of Medicine in the country, at the Central University of Madrid. He held the chair until 1978 when he retired as professor emeritus. In 1951, during the period of Joaquín Ruiz-Jiménez as Ministry of education, he became rector of the institution, creating a circle of certain political openness. He remained the rector until 1956.

He was a member of the Royal Spanish Academy, the Royal National Academy of Medicine (elected 1946) and of the Royal Academy of History (elected 1956). He obtained the Prince of Asturias award for Communication and Humanities in 1989 and was awarded with the Menéndez Pelayo International Prize in 1991.

== Philosophical work ==
His work is very varied and extensive. Regarding his historical-medical work, his works on medicine in classical Greece, his history and theory of clinical history and his works on Santiago Ramón y Cajal stand out. In addition, he coordinated a 7-volume, monumental Historia Universal de la Medicina (1972–1975) (Universal History of Medicine), in which not only all the Spanish specialists participated, but also renowned foreign historians of medicine.

He published several books on philosophical anthropology in which he analyzed the profound nature of the human being and the current history and theory of the problem of body and soul.

== Disciples ==
He was able to attract a good number of physicians around him who began to professionalize the History of Medicine (and, later, of science) in Spain. They stand out, among them, Luis S. Granjel (1920–2014), professor at the University of Salamanca, José María López Piñero (1933–2010) in Valencia, Juan Antonio Paniagua Arellano (1920–2010) in Navarra and Agustín Albarracín Teulón (1922–2001) and Diego Gracia Guillén (born in 1941), at the Complutense University of Madrid.

== Books ==
- Reconciliar España. Editorial Triacastela. 2010. ISBN 978-84-95840-46-2.
- Escritos sobre Cajal. Editorial Triacastela. 2010. ISBN 978-84-95840-46-2.
- España como problema. Galaxia Gutenberg; Círculo de Lectores. 2006. ISBN 978-84-8109-548-7.
- El médico y el enfermo. Editorial Triacastela. 2003. ISBN 978-84-95840-03-5.
- Qué es el hombre: evolución y sentido de la vida. Círculo de Lectores. 1999. ISBN 978-84-226-7795-6. (Premio Internacional de Ensayo Jovellanos).
- Historia universal de la medicina. Masson. 1998. ISBN 978-84-458-0670-8.
- El problema de ser cristiano. Círculo de Lectores. 1998. ISBN 978-84-226-6784-1.
- Idea del hombre. Círculo de Lectores. 1997. ISBN 978-84-226-6148-1.
- Alma, cuerpo, persona. Galaxia Gutenberg. 1997. ISBN 978-84-8109-039-0.
- La Generación del 98. Espasa-Colección Austral. 1997 (2ª edición). ISBN 978-84-239-7405-4.
- Ser y conducta del hombre. Espasa-Calpe. 1996. ISBN 978-84-239-7824-3.
- Cuerpo y alma. Estructura dinámica del cuerpo humano. Espasa-Calpe. 1996. ISBN 978-84-239-7295-1.
- Creer, esperar, amar. Galaxia Gutenberg; Círculo de Lectores. 1993. ISBN 8481090034.
- El cuerpo humano. Teoría actual. Espasa-Universidad. 1989. ISBN 84-239-6543-0.
- Teoría y realidad del otro. Alianza. 1988. ISBN 84-206-2352-0.
- La medicina actual. Seminarios y ediciones s.a. 1973.
- Sobre la amistad. Espasa-Calpe. 1972.
- La espera y la esperanza. Historia y teoría del esperar humano. Revista de Occidente. 1957.
- Historia de la Medicina (Medicina moderna y contemporánea). Científico Médica. 1954.
- Los valores morales del Nacionalsindicalismo. Editora Nacional. 1941.
