= Arriba (newspaper) =

Spanish newspaper (1935–1979)

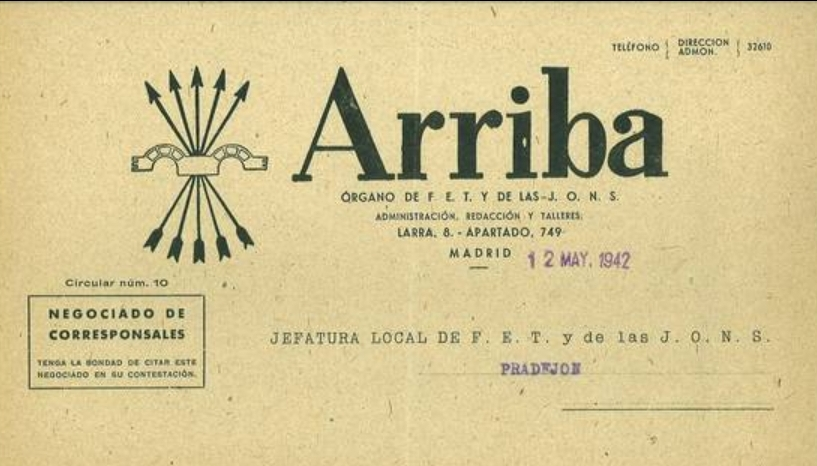
- Newspaper cover from 12 May 1942
- Type: Daily newspaper
- Owner: Cadena de Prensa del Movimiento
- Founder: José Antonio Primo de Rivera
- Founded: 21 March 1935
- Ceased publication: 16 June 1979
- Political alignment: Falangism; Francoism
- Language: Spanish
- Headquarters: Madrid, Spain
- Country: Francoist Spain
- ISSN: 2485-9850

Arriba (Spanish for "up") was a Spanish daily newspaper published in Madrid between 1935 and 1979. It was the official organ of the Falange, and also of the regime during the Franco rule in the country.

== History ==
Arriba was first published in Madrid 21 March 1935 by José Antonio Primo de Rivera, founder of the Falange Española. The paper soon became the official weekly newspaper of the Spanish Falange. On 5 March 1936 it was suspended by the government of the Second Spanish Republic. The suspension continued through the Spanish Civil War. After nearly three years of fighting, Madrid was captured by Nationalist troops under Francisco Franco. The Falangists seized the facilities of the newspaper El Sol and, beginning 29 March 1939, published a revived Arriba as the daily newspaper of the Movimiento Nacional. It soon became the official newspaper of the Spanish State under Franco.

During the Spanish transition to democracy after Franco's death, the Spanish Council of Ministers ordered the closure of Arriba, on 15 June 1979. Its final issue was published the following day.

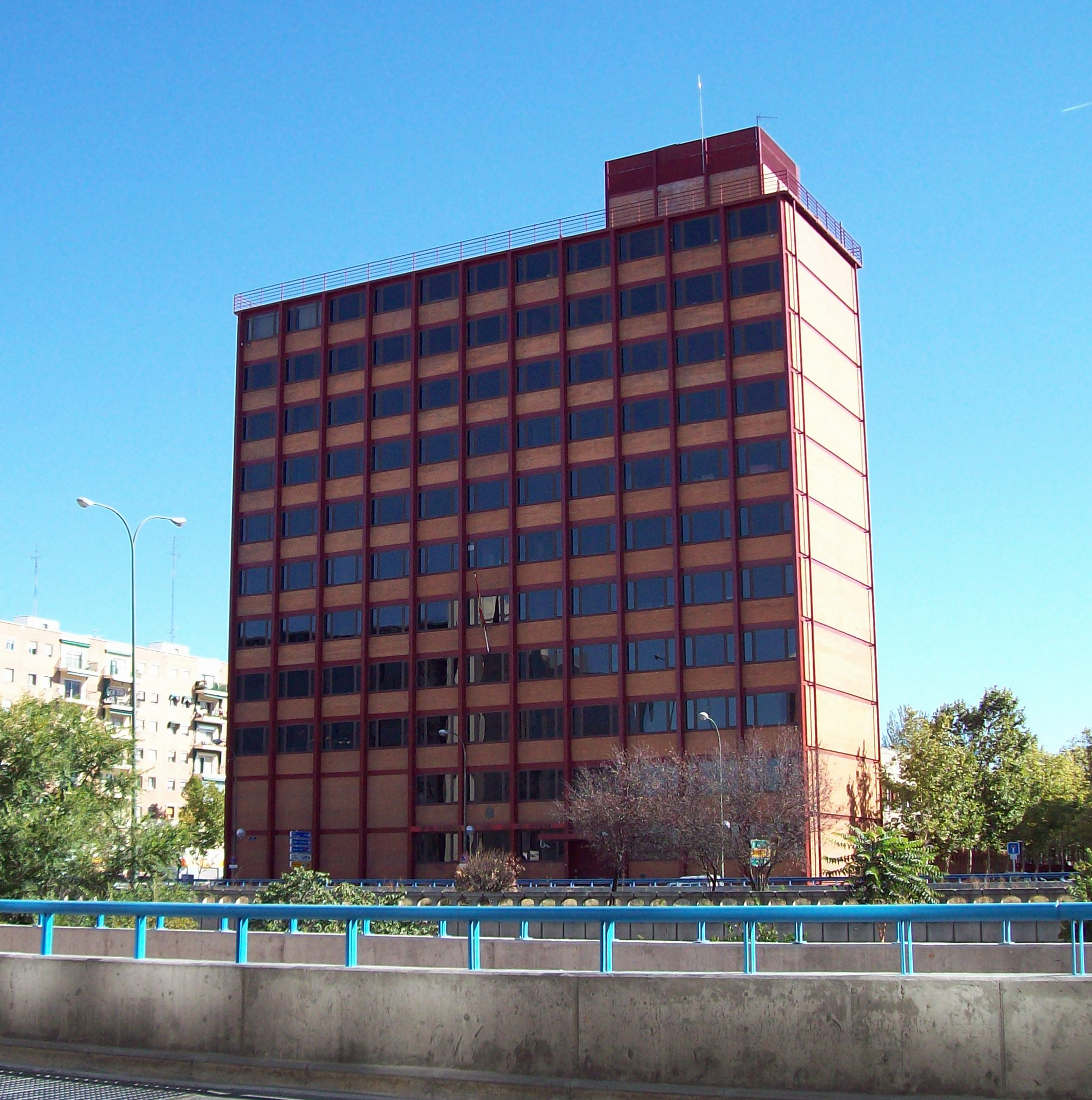
This Madrid building was the headquarters of Arriba from 1962 until its closure in 1979.

== Antisemitism, anti-Freemasonry, and anti-Communism ==
Franco believed in the international Judeo-Masonic-Communist conspiracy theory. He believed that Jews, Freemasons and Communists were conspiring to destroy Christianity in general and Spain in particular. Franco's Antisemitism was not racialised, as was that of the Nazis: it was more along the lines of historic Catholic anti-Judaism. Arriba's Antisemitism, in line with Franco's own, was virulent, and was followed in some cases by incidents of anti-Jewish violence.

=== The campaign against Sepu ===
Sepu (Sociedad Española de Precios Únicos), Spain's first department store, was founded in Barcelona on 9 January 1934 by Swiss citizens of Jewish origin, Henry Reisembach and Edouard Wormsde, who also opened a second store in Madrid. In the 1930s they were the subject of a vigorous campaign on the part of the Falange. Arriba directly accused the company of exploiting its employees while taking advantage of links to political power:

These Jews of SEPU provide grounds to deal with them daily, by their relations with the employees they exploit. If their mere presence suffices to produce indignation, if the outrages committed by their staff suffice to rouse the most tranquil. We ask, does SEPU enjoy carte blanche? Who covers for SEPU? Does the director of [the Ministry of] Labor know the cases of SEPU?

This campaign began with the first issue of the newspaper and was systematic. It was contemporaneous with, and inspired by, the Nazi assaults on Jewish-owned businesses in Germany. In 1935, the Sepu department store in Madrid was assaulted by Falangist militants; the store's windows were broken on several occasions. That same year, Arriba wrote:

The international Jewish-Masonic conspiracy is the creator of the great evils that have arrived for humanity: such are capitalism and Marxism.

=== Franco's articles ===
Arriba carried a series of articles by Franco himself (compiled in 1952 under the title Masonería, "(Free)Masonry"). The series began on 14 December 1946 and was signed with the pseudonym Jakin Boor. The articles rant against Freemasonry, Communism, Jews, and (later in the series) the State of Israel. Israel had voted against admitting Spain into the United Nations and accused Franco's government of being complicit with and supportive of the former Nazi regime of Adolf Hitler in Germany and the former Fascist regime of Benito Mussolini in Italy. On 9 August 1949 Franco wrote an article in Arriba entitled "Alta masonería" ("High Masonry"):

The recognition of Israel, its entry into the UN, the hypocritical and unjust conduct toward Spain, the enmity against Argentina, the systematic opposition in the government of the state, the great decisions about the national order, obey exclusively the dictates of (Free)Masonry.

On 11 December 1949 he wrote:

To so extend (Free)Masonry through various nations faced with a people deeply entrenched in the society we live, who see an ideal field for machinations in the sect that comes dragging a secular complex of inferiority and of rancor from their dispersion: they are the Jews of the world, the army of speculators accustomed to break or skirt the law, which benefits the sect to be considered powerful. Judaism, atheism and Catholic dissidence feed thence the continental lodges.

The articles by Franco also made reference to criminal rituals and to the Protocols of the Elders of Zion.
