= La Tarde (newspaper) =

Defunct Spanish newspaper

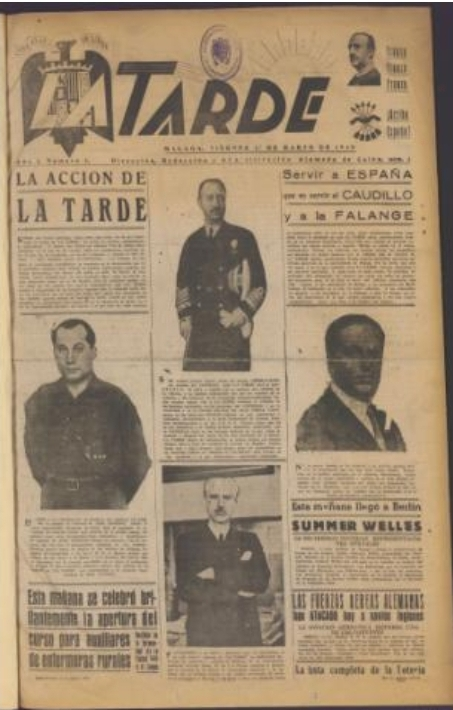
- Newspaper cover from March 1st, 1940.
- Type: Daily Newspaper
- Owner: Cadena de Prensa del Movimiento
- Founded: March 1st, 1940
- Ceased publication: September 30th, 1975
- Political alignment: Francoism
- Language: Spanish
- City: Málaga
- Country: Spain
- ISSN: 2487-7905
- OCLC number: 1142942239

La Tarde (The Afternoon) was a Spanish evening newspaper published in Málaga. The newspaper was owned by the Cadena de Prensa del Movimiento. Its first issue appeared on March 1, 1940, and it ceased publication on September 30, 1975.

== History ==
La Tarde replaced Boinas Rojas, the newspaper of the Falange Española Tradicionalista y de las JONS, which had ceased publication the previous day. Its facilities were located at Alameda de Colón number 2, in Málaga, whose population at that time was 238,000 inhabitants, where the morning newspaper Sur, from the same chain was also printed. During the Francoist dictatorship, it became part of the Cadena de Prensa del Movimiento (Press Network of the Movement).

La Tarde paid special attention to the Costa del Sol and local news. Its first editor was Juan Cortés Salido, and among those who worked on the publication were his sons Juan, Francisco, and Rafael Cortés. The latter wrote summaries of World War II, which he illustrated himself with maps where he drew arrows indicating the position and movement of troops. Unlike Sur, La Tarde never achieved particular success with the Málaga public and its circulation never exceeded 3,000 copies at its peak. Nor did it have healthy finances, which meant that it incurred continuous losses.

The newspaper initially consisted of four or eight pages, which were later expanded. The writers had to work quickly because the paper had to be printed and ready for sale by three in the afternoon. Sports coverage was handled by Manuel Castillo as the main columnist—he later became head of the sports section at Sur, Diego Rivero for football, and José Mancera. There was also bullfighting coverage by Benito Marín, art reviews by Racor (Rafael Cortés), a double-page spread titled "The Topics of the Day" written by Francisco Javier Bueno, a daily page for fan clubs by Pedro Antúnez, and a section titled "Calle Larios" by Martirico that compiled local news. The photographs were by Guidet, Pepe Botella was listed as editor-in-chief, and Juan Antonio Rando, who later became director of Radio Nacional de España, was also on the staff. On Tuesday, September 30, 1975, the last issue of La Tarde, then directed by Timoteo Esteban Vega, was published, announcing in a front-page editorial the decision to close the newspaper to strengthen Sur, which absorbed most of the staff.

== Directors ==
The newspaper's management included Juan Cortés Salido, Antonio Gallardo Sánchez, Francisco Villalgordo Montalbán, and Timoteo Esteban Vega.

== Bibliography ==
- De las Heras Pedrosa, Carlos (2000). The press of the movement and its advertising management, 1936-1984. University of Malaga. ISBN 84-7496-771-6.
- Reig García, Ramón (2011). Communication in Andalusia: History, structure and new technologies. Seville: Andalusian Studies Center. ISBN 978-84-939078-0-8.
