= Falangism =

Political ideology of the Falange Española

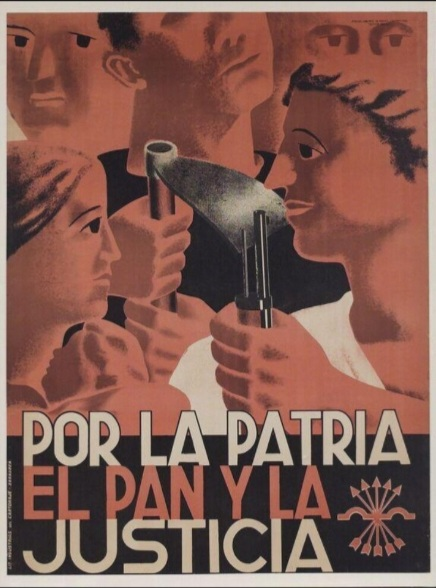
Falangist propaganda poster saying "For the Fatherland, Bread, and Justice"

Falangism (Spanish: Falangismo) is a political ideology created by José Antonio Primo de Rivera that originated in Spain with the Falange Española and parties descending from it including the Falange Española de las JONS, the FET y de las JONS, and multiple other parties after the dissolution of the FET y de las JONS. Falangism combines Spanish nationalism, authoritarianism, Catholic traditionalism, and anti-communism, along with a call for national syndicalism.

The FE de las JONS merged with the Traditionalist Communion and several other parties in 1937 following the Unification Decree of Francisco Franco, to form FET y de las JONS. This new Falange was meant to incorporate all Nationalist political factions and became the sole political party of Francoist Spain. The merger was opposed by some of the original Falangists, such as Manuel Hedilla.

Falangism places a strong emphasis on the Catholic religious identity of Spain, resulting in what is known as National Catholicism. However, Falangism has held some secular views on the Catholic Church's direct influence on Spanish society, since one of the tenets of the Falangist ideology holds that the state should have the supreme authority over the nation. Falangism emphasizes the need for total authority, hierarchy, and order in society. Like Italian Fascism, German Nazism, and other revolutionary nationalist ideologies of the era, Falangism is ultranationalist, anti-communist, anti-capitalist, anti-democratic, and anti-liberal.

The Falange's original manifesto, the "Twenty-Seven Point Program of the Falange" (later changed to the "Twenty-Six Point Program of the Falange" by Francisco Franco), declared Falangism to support the unity of Spain and the elimination of regional separatism, the establishment of a dictatorship led by the Falange, using political violence as a means to regenerate Spain, and promoting the revival and development of the Spanish Empire. Some of these attributes align with the attributes of Classical Fascism which is a widely cited influence of Falangism even by its founders. The manifesto also called for a national syndicalist economy and advocated agrarian reforms, industrial expansion, and respect for private property with the exception of nationalizing credit facilities to prevent usury.

Falangism has a disputed relationship with fascism with one interpretation held by some historians being that the Falange was a fascist movement based on its fascist leanings during the early years, A second interpretation is that the Falange from 1937 onward during Franco's leadership was a compromise between radical fascism and authoritarian conservatism. A third interpretation by historian Enrique Moradiellos is that upon Franco's takeover of the Falange that his regime during the Spanish Civil War became fascistized, adopting fascist ideology and political and social organizations emulating those of Fascist Italy; however, following the fall of the Fascist regime in Italy in 1943, Franco distanced his regime from fascism.

The Spanish Falange and its affiliates in Hispanic states around the world promoted a form of panhispanism known as Hispanidad that advocated both the cultural and economic union of Hispanic societies around the world.

== Position within the political spectrum ==
Scholarly sources reviewing Falangism place it on the far right of the political spectrum. Falangism has attacked both the political left and the right as its "enemies", declaring itself to be neither left nor right, but a syncretic third position. The founder of the Falange, José Antonio Primo de Rivera, said: "Fascism was born to inspire a faith not of the Right (which at bottom aspires to conserve everything, even injustice) or of the Left (which at bottom aspires to destroy everything, even goodness), but a collective, integral, national faith." Some also state they lean more towards authoritarian conservatism.

== Ideology ==
=== Nationalism and racialism ===
During the Spanish Civil War, the Falange and the Carlists both promoted the incorporation of Portugal into Spain, and the new Falange resulting from their unification in 1937 continued to do so. The Falange also advocated the incorporation of Gibraltar and French Morocco into Spain, both before and after its merger with the Carlists. During its early years, the Falange produced maps of Spain that included Portugal as a province of Spain. The Carlists stated that a Carlist Spain would retake Gibraltar and Portugal. After the civil war, some radical members of the Falange called for reunification with Portugal and annexation of former Spanish territories in the French Pyrenees. During World War II, Franco in a communiqué with Germany on 26 May 1942 declared that Portugal should be made a part of Spain.

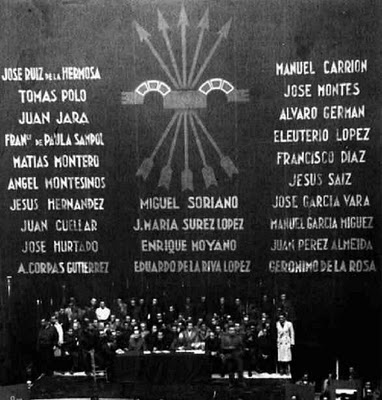
Rally of the Spanish Falange in Madrid in 1935

Some of the Falangists in Spain had supported racialism and racialist policies, viewing races as real and existing with differing strengths, weaknesses and accompanying cultures inextricably obtained with them. However, unlike Nazism, Falangism is unconcerned about racial purity and does not denounce other races for being inferior, claiming "that every race has a particular cultural significance" and claiming that the intermixing of the Spanish race and other races has produced a "Hispanic supercaste" that is "ethically improved, morally robust, spiritually vigorous". It was less concerned about biological Spanish racial regeneration than it was in advocating the necessity of Spanish Catholic spiritual regeneration. Some have nonetheless promoted eugenics designed to eliminate physical and psychological damage caused by pathogenic agents. Falangism did and still does support natal policies to stimulate increased fertility rate among ideal physically and morally fit citizens.

Franco praised Spain's Visigothic heritage, saying that the Germanic tribe of the Visigoths gave Spaniards their "national love for law and order". During the early years of the Falangist regime of Franco, the regime admired Nazi Germany and had Spanish archaeologists seek to demonstrate that Spaniards were part of the Aryan race, particularly through their Visigothic heritage.

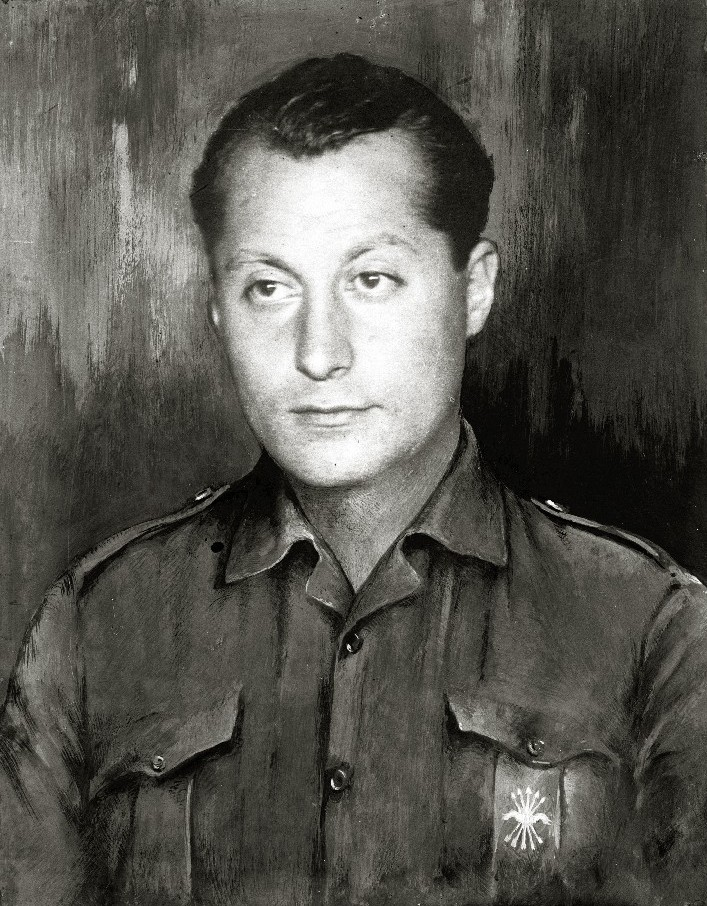
José Antonio Primo de Rivera, the leader of the Falange Española from 1933 to 1934 and the Falange Española de las JONS from 1934 to 1936.

The founder of the Falange Española, José Antonio Primo de Rivera, had little interest in addressing the Jewish question outside areas of political issues. The Falange's position was influenced by the fact of the small size of the Jewish community in Spain at the time that did not favour the development of strong antisemitism. Primo de Rivera saw the solution to the "Jewish problem" in Spain as simple: the conversion of Jews to Catholicism. However, on the issue of perceived political tendencies amongst Jews, he warned about Jewish-Marxist influences over the working classes. The Falangist daily newspaper Arriba claimed that "the Judeo-Masonic International is the creator of two great evils that have afflicted humanity: capitalism and Marxism". Primo de Rivera approved of attacks by Falangists on the Jewish-owned SEPU department stores in 1935.

The Spanish Falange and its Hispanic affiliates have promoted the cultural, economic and racial unity of Hispanic peoples around the world in "hispanidad". It has sought to unite Hispanic peoples through proposals to create a commonwealth or federation of Spanish-speaking states headed by Spain.

=== Economy ===
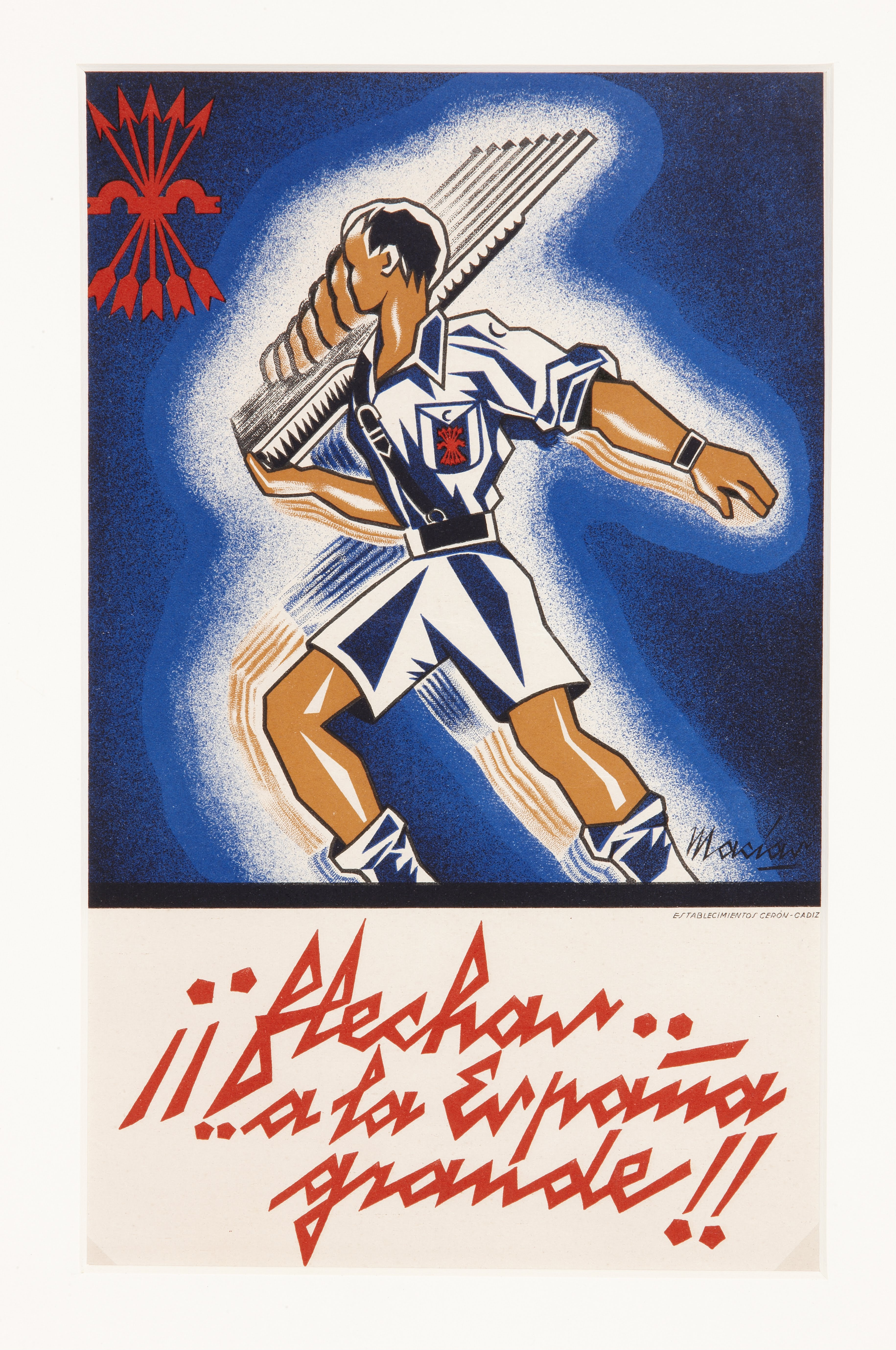
Spanish Civil War-era poster with the slogan "Arrows... for Spain the Great!!, c. 1936 – c. 1939

Falangism supports a national, autarkic, trans-class society while opposing individual-class-based societies such as bourgeois or proletarian societies. Falangism opposes class conflict. José Antonio Primo de Rivera declared that "[t]he State is founded on two principles—service to the united nation and the cooperation of classes".

Initially, Falangism in Spain, as promoted by Primo de Rivera, advocated a "national syndicalist" economy that rejected both capitalism and communism. Primo de Rivera denounced capitalism for being an individualist economy at the hands of the bourgeoisie that turned workers "into a dehumanized cog in the machinery of bourgeois production," and denounced state socialist economies for "enslaving the individual by handing control of production to the state."

The Falange's original manifesto, the "Twenty-Seven Points", called for a social revolution to create a national syndicalist economy that creates national syndicates of both employees and employers to organize and control the economic activity mutually. It further advocated agrarian reform, industrial expansion, and respect for private property except nationalizing credit facilities to prevent capitalist usury. The manifesto also supported criminalization of strikes by employees and lockouts by employers as illegal acts, while mirroring social democratic policies in supporting state jurisdiction over the setting of wages.

After the merger of the original Falange with the Carlists in 1937 to form the new Falange (FET y de las JONS) that would serve as the sole political party of Francoist Spain, the result was a Falange intended as a "melting pot" for all of the various political factions on the Nationalist side of the civil war. It proclaimed support for "an economic middle way equidistant from liberal capitalism and Marxist materialism." Private initiative and ownership was recognized as the most effective means of production, but owners and managers were responsible for advancing that production for the common good. At the same time, it was made clear that the economy would continue to rest on private property, whose protection was guaranteed, while the state was envisioned as undertaking economic initiatives only when private enterprise failed or "the interests of the nation require it." In October 1937, the new leader of the Falange, Raimundo Fernández-Cuesta, declared national syndicalism to be fully compatible with capitalism, drawing praise from the non-falangist right.

The Franco-era Falange supported the development of cooperatives such as the Mondragon Corporation because it bolstered the Francoist claim of the nonexistence of social classes in Spain during his rule.

Falangism is staunchly anti-communist. The Spanish Falange supported Spanish intervention during World War II against the Soviet Union in the name of anti-communism, resulting in Spain supporting the Anti-Comintern Pact and sending volunteers to join Nazi Germany's foreign legions on the Eastern Front to support the German war effort against the Soviet Union.

=== Gender roles ===
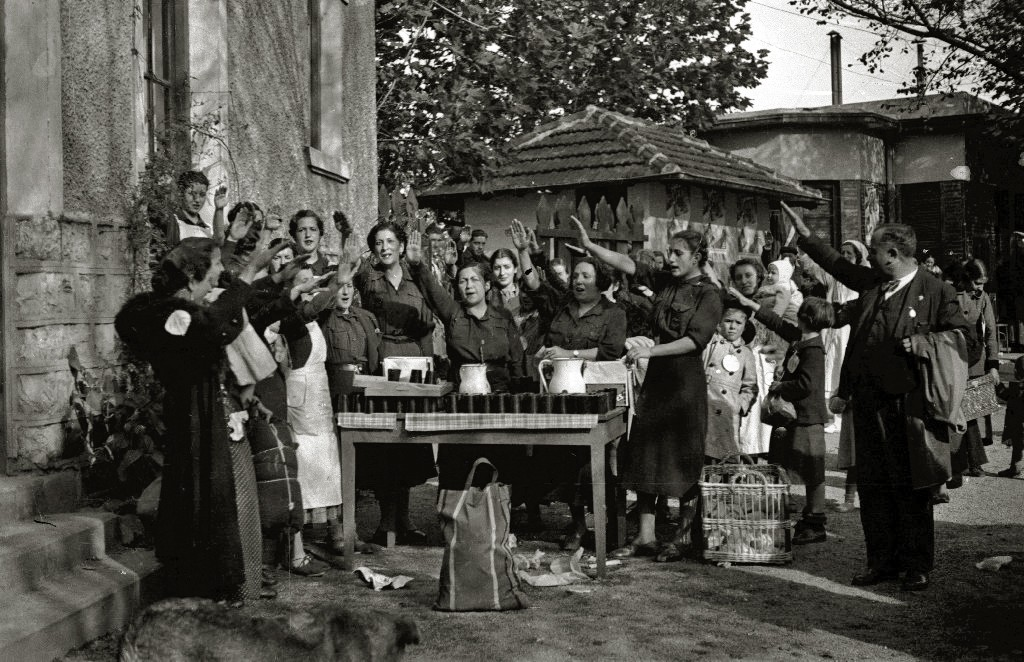
Sección Femenina volunteers do the Roman salute before delivering food for the needy in 1937.

The Spanish Falange supported conservative ideas about women and supported rigid gender roles that stipulated that women's main duties in life were to be loving mothers and submissive wives. This policy was set against that of the Second Spanish Republic that provided universal suffrage to women. Its Sección Femenina, 'Female Section' instructed women to be good wives and mothers, teaching domestic economy and cultivating the folk dances of Spain in its Coros y Danzas, 'Choirs and Dances' troupes. The Female Section enabled its leaders, women such as José Antonio's sister Pilar, who never married, to achieve prominent public roles while promoting family life.

== Falangist theorists ==
- José Antonio Primo de Rivera
- Nimio de Anquin
- Álvaro Cunqueiro
- Ernesto Giménez Caballero
- Carlos Ibarguren
- Pedro Laín Entralgo
- Ramiro Ledesma Ramos
- Leopoldo Lugones
- Eugenio d'Ors
- Leopoldo Panero
- José María Pemán
- Onésimo Redondo
- Dionisio Ridruejo
- Luis Rosales
- Pedro Sainz Rodríguez
- Rafael Sánchez Mazas
- Gonzalo Torrente Ballester
- Antonio Tovar
- Julio Ruiz de Alda

== See also ==
- List of Falangist movements
- Falange Auténtica
- Bolivian Socialist Falange
- Falange Española Independiente
- Falangism in Latin America
- Falangist Mountain Unity
- Kataeb Party
- National Falange
- National Radical Camp Falanga
- National syndicalism
- Philippine Falange
- National Radical Camp
- Neolibertarian Falangism

=== Anti-Falangism ===
- Basque separatism
- Catalan independence movement
- Insubordinate movement in Spain
